= Philippines women's national basketball team =

Philippines
- FIBA ranking: 31 ▼1 (September 14, 2026)
- Joined FIBA: 1936
- FIBA zone: FIBA Asia
- National federation: SBP
- Coach: BT Toews
- Nickname: Gilas Hiraya

Asia Cup
- Appearances: 18

Asian Games
- Appearances: 2
Home	Away

The Philippines women's national basketball team (Filipino: Pambansang koponan ng basketbol ng kababaihan ng Pilipinas) is managed by the Samahang Basketbol ng Pilipinas (SBP).

The women's national team is starting to receive more attention from local basketball enthusiasts. The current roster consists of a mix of players from the UAAP, NCAA Philippines, the Women’s Maharlika Professional Basketball League, the Australian NBL, the US NCAA, and professional leagues in Europe and Asia. The women's national team has been playing in Division A of the FIBA Asia Championship for Women for the past few editions of the tournament and is the highest-ranked team in Southeast Asia.

== History ==
=== Early history ===
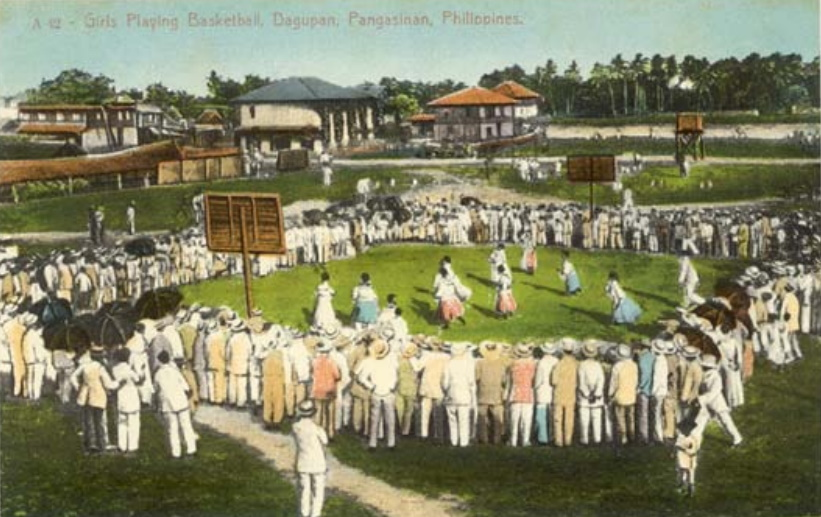
Filipino women in Dagupan playing basketball as depicted in a 1910 postcard.

Women's basketball in the Philippines dates back as early as the 1910s. Basketball was first introduced to the Philippine public school system by the Americans as a women's sort in 1910 and was played in Interscholastic meets in 1911 until 1913. The sport used by Americans to promote good health and motherhood and citizenry grew in popularity among women. Women's basketball met opposition from conservative groups, particularly the Catholic Church who view bloomers worn by women basketball players as inappropriate. By the time skirts were allowed to be worn above bloomers as a compromise, women's basketball is already in the decline and is only played in provincial and local interscholastic meets. Indoor softball and as well as volleyball became the more preferred sport for Filipino women.

=== BAP era ===
The women's national team was organized by the Basketball Association of the Philippines (BAP), which was the recognized national sports association for basketball in the Philippines.

The last national team under BAP before its suspension was the team mentored by head coach Raymond Celis who was preparing the Philippine women's national team for the 2005 SEA Games. The Samahang Basketbol ng Pilipinas (SBP) superseded the BAP in 2007.

=== SBP era (2007–present) ===
==== Perlas Pilipinas 1.0 (2007–2015) ====
On 2007, Discovery Suites, a hotel brand, became the main sponsor of the women's national team. On 2008, Haydee Ong was appointed as head coach of the women's national team replacing Matthew "Fritz" Gaston, who guided the team to a bronze medal finish at the 2007 Southeast Asian Games in Thailand and a silver medal finish at the 2007 SEABA Championship for Women. Under Ong, the team won the gold medal at the 2010 SEABA Championship for Women, the country's first medal at the said tournament. The team previously won silver during the 1995, 1997, and 2007 editions of the tournament.

However by February 2015, the team backed Discovery Suites was disbanded which the sponsor insisted was done without explanation.

==== Perlas Pilipinas 2.0 (2015–2019) ====
The SBP appointed Patrick Aquino as the new head coach of the national team. His first task will be to guide the national team at the 2015 Southeast Asian Games. Ever Bilena Cosmetics, Inc. has been made the new sponsor of the national team. SBP executive director Sonny Barrios pointed out the decision to make changes in the coaching staff of the women's team was made after discussions among members of the search and screening committee, which is composed of several basketball stakeholders.

In a historic run, Perlas officially promoted in the Level 1 of the FIBA Asia Women's Championships that will held in 2017, after the win against India, 82–76.

==== Gilas Pilipinas Women (2019–2026) ====
In May 2019, the SBP announced that the Gilas Pilipinas name would be used across all its sporting programs for the men's, men's youth (men's under-19 and men's under-17), men's 3x3 and women's teams. Aquino assumed responsibility over the Gilas Pilipinas Women program.

Gilas Women attained their best finish at the FIBA Women's Asia Cup in the 2023 edition. They avoided the relegation playoff for the very first time by at least one group stage game at the expense of Chinese Taipei – also their first group stage win since their promotion to the first division in 2015. They finished sixth overall in a tournament of eight teams.

In August 2024, they took part in the 2026 FIBA Women's Basketball World Cup Pre-Qualifying Tournament in Rwanda, their first ever non-FIBA Asia competition.

The SBP in March 2026 announced that long-time coach Patrick Aquino has left the head coaching role with Aquino's potential replacement include both local and foreign ccoaches. The federation then announced the appointment of Japan-based Canadian BT Toews as the head coach of the Philippines on May 20, 2026. His first tournament with the Philippines is the 2028 FIBA Women's Pre-Qualifying Qualifying Tournament in August 2026.

==== Gilas Hiraya (2026–present) ====
In October 2026, SBP announced a rename of the team which is titled Gilas Hiraya and will be used on tournaments moving forward. The new moniker adds the word "hiraya" which is means "fruit of one's dream" to represent the team's aspirations.

== Uniform ==
Adidas is the official outfitter of the Philippine national team program which includes the women's team since May 2025.

Manufacturer

- 2025–present: Adidas

== Fixtures and results ==
2026 results

Date	Opponent	Result	Score	Venue	Competition
17 August	Mexico	L	58–61	Arena Astros, Guadalajara, Mexico	2028 FIBA Women's PQT
19 August	Canada	L	38–85	Arena Astros, Guadalajara, Mexico	2028 FIBA Women's PQT
20 August	Senegal	W	79–75	Arena Astros, Guadalajara, Mexico	2028 FIBA Women's PQT
17 September	Kazakhstan	W	86–58	Aichi International Arena, Nagoya, Japan	Asian Games
20 September	Hong Kong	W	90–73	Aichi International Arena, Nagoya, Japan	Asian Games
22 September	Japan	L	67–89	Aichi International Arena, Nagoya, Japan	Asian Games
24 September	Chinese Taipei	L	71–83	Aichi International Arena, Nagoya, Japan	Asian Games

== Medal count ==
Event	Editions	1st edition	Total				Notes
Event	Editions	1st edition	Gold medal	Silver medal	Bronze medal	Tot.	Notes
FIBA Women's Basketball World Cup	0	0	0	0	0	0	
Olympic Games	0	0	0	0	0	0	
FIBA Women's Asia Cup	16	1965	0	0	0	0	
Asian Games	2	1998	0	0	0	0	
SEABA Championship for Women	7	1995	2	2	2	6	
Southeast Asian Games	18	1981	2	7	5	14	

== Competitions ==
=== World Cup ===
The Philippines' FIBA Women's Basketball World Cup Record
Year	Position	Pld	W	L
(Chile) 1953	Did not participate			
(Brazil) 1957	Did not participate			
(Soviet Union) 1959	Did not participate			
(Peru) 1964	Did not participate			
(Czechoslovakia) 1967	Did not qualify			
(Brazil) 1971	Did not participate			
(Colombia) 1975	Did not participate			
(South Korea) 1979	Did not qualify			
(Brazil) 1983	Did not qualify			
(Soviet Union) 1986	Did not participate			
(Malaysia) 1990	Did not participate			
(Australia) 1994	Did not qualify			
(Germany) 1998	Did not participate			
(China) 2002	Did not participate			
(Brazil) 2006	Suspended			
(Czech Republic) 2010	Did not qualify			
(Turkey) 2014	Did not qualify			
(Spain) 2018	Did not qualify			
(Australia) 2022	Did not qualify			
(Germany) 2026	Did not qualify			
(Japan) 2030	To be determined			
Total		0	0	0

=== Olympic Games ===
The Philippines' Olympic Games Record
Year	Position	Pld	W	L
(Canada) 1976	Did not participate			
(Soviet Union) 1980	Boycotted			
(United States) 1984	Did not qualify			
(South Korea) 1988	Did not participate			
(Spain) 1992	Did not participate			
(United States) 1996	Did not qualify			
(Australia) 2000	Did not participate			
(Greece) 2004	Did not qualify			
(China) 2008	Did not participate			
(United Kingdom) 2012	Did not participate			
(Brazil) 2016	Did not qualify			
(Japan) 2020	Did not qualify			
(France) 2024	Did not qualify			
(United States) 2028	To be determined			
(Australia) 2032	To be determined			
Total		0	0	0

=== Asia Cup ===
The Philippines' Asian Cup Record
Year	Division A				Division B			
Year	Position	Pld	W	L	Position	Pld	W	L
(South Korea) 1965	4th place	8	2	6	No Division B / Level II			
(Taiwan) 1968	6th place	7	2	5	No Division B / Level II			
(Malaysia) 1970	Did not participate				No Division B / Level II			
(Taiwan) 1972	Did not participate				No Division B / Level II			
(South Korea) 1974	Did not participate				No Division B / Level II			
(Hong Kong) 1976	6th place	6	1	5	No Division B / Level II			
(Malaysia) 1978	8th place	8	2	6	No Division B / Level II			
(Hong Kong) 1980	Did not participate				No Division B / Level II			
(Japan) 1982	8th place	4	1	3	No Division B / Level II			
(China) 1984	4th place	8	4	4	No Division B / Level II			
(Malaysia) 1986	Did not participate				No Division B / Level II			
(Hong Kong) 1988	Did not participate				No Division B / Level II			
(Singapore) 1990	Did not participate				Did not participate			
(South Korea) 1992	Did not participate				No Division B / Level II			
(Japan) 1994	10th place	Level II			5th place	5	2	3
(Japan) 1995	9th place	Level II			3rd place	5	3	2
(Thailand) 1997	Did not participate				Did not participate			
(Japan) 1999	Did not participate				Did not participate			
(Thailand) 2001	Did not participate				Did not participate			
(Japan) 2004	8th place	Level II			3rd place	3	1	2
(China) 2005	11th place	Level II			6th place	5	1	4
(South Korea) 2007	Did not participate				Did not participate			
(India) 2009	10th place	Level II			4th place	5	3	2
(Japan) 2011	Did not participate				Did not participate			
(Thailand) 2013	10th place	Level II			4th place	5	3	2
(China) 2015	7th place	Level II			1st place	6	5	1
(India) 2017	7th place	6	1	5	Division A			
(India) 2019	7th place	4	1	3	No Division B			
(Jordan) 2021	7th place	4	1	3	Division A			
(Australia) 2023	6th place	5	1	4	Division A			
(China) 2025	6th place	5	1	4	Division A			
(Philippines) 2027	Qualified as hosts				Division A			
Total		65	17	48		34	18	16

=== Asian Games ===
The Philippines' Asian Games Record
Year	Position	Pld	W	L
(Iran) 1974	Did not participate			
(Thailand) 1978	Did not participate			
(India) 1982	Did not participate			
(South Korea) 1986	Did not participate			
(China) 1990	Did not participate			
(Japan) 1994	Did not participate			
(Thailand) 1998	6th place	3	0	3
(South Korea) 2002	Did not participate			
(Qatar) 2006	Suspended			
(China) 2010	Did not participate			
(South Korea) 2014	Did not participate			
(Indonesia) 2018	Did not participate			
(China) 2022	5th place	4	2	2
(Japan) 2026	5th place	4	2	2
Total		11	4	7

=== SEABA Championship ===
The Philippines' Southeast Asian Championship Record
Year	Position	Pld	W	L
(Thailand) 1995	2nd place			
(Thailand) 1997	2nd place			
(Malaysia) 1999	3rd place			
(Thailand) 2002	3rd place			
(Singapore) 2004	Did not participate			
(Thailand) 2007	2nd place	6	5	1
(Philippines) 2010	1st place	5	5	0
(Indonesia) 2014	Did not participate			
(Malaysia) 2016	1st place	6	6	0
Total	2 gold, 3 silver, 2 bronze	16–1 (Incomplete)		

=== Southeast Asian Games ===
The Philippines' Southeast Asian Games Record
Year	Position	Pld	W	L
(Malaysia) 1977	Did not enter			
(Indonesia) 1979	did not enter			
(Philippines) 1981	2nd place	5	3	2
(Singapore) 1983	2nd place	4	3	1
(Thailand) 1985	2nd place	3	2	1
(Indonesia) 1987	3rd place	5	3	2
(Malaysia) 1989	4th place	4	1	3
(Philippines) 1991	4th place	6	3	3
(Singapore) 1993	5th place	4	0	4
(Thailand) 1995	2nd place	6	4	2
(Indonesia) 1997	4th place	5	2	3
(Brunei) 1999	Not held			
(Malaysia) 2001	3rd place	4	2	2
(Vietnam) 2003	3rd place	5	3	2
(Philippines) 2005	Suspended			
(Thailand) 2007	3rd place	3	1	2
(Laos) 2009	Not held			
(Indonesia) 2011	2nd place	4	3	1
(Myanmar) 2013	2nd place	4	3	1
(Singapore) 2015	4th place	5	3	2
(Malaysia) 2017	4th place	6	4	2
(Philippines) 2019	1st place	3	3	0
(Vietnam) 2021	1st place	5	4	1
(Cambodia) 2023	2nd place	6	5	1
(Thailand) 2025	1st place	4	4	0
Total	3 gold, 7 silver, 5 bronze	91	56	35

=== Other tournaments ===
The Philippines' Other tournaments Record
Tournament	Position	Pld	W	L
(Philippines) 2011 Discovery Women's Invitational	1st place	4	4	0
(Philippines) 2013 Discovery Women's Invitational	1st place	4	4	0
(Philippines) 2015 Discovery Women's Invitational	1st place	4	4	0
(Taiwan) 2019 William Jones Cup	6th place	5	0	5
(Taiwan) 2023 William Jones Cup	5th place	5	1	4
(Taiwan) 2024 William Jones Cup	4th place	5	2	3
(Taiwan) 2025 William Jones Cup	5th place	5	1	4

== Team ==
=== Current roster ===
Roster for the 2026 Asian Games.

Philippines women's national basketball team – 2026 Asian Games roster
Players
Coaches

Pos.	No.	Name	Age – Date of birth	Height	Club	Ctr.
F	3	Afril Bernardino	30 – 3 April 1996	1.72 m (5 ft 8 in)	Batangas New Zealand Bluefire	(Philippines)
F	5	Kent Pastrana	26 – 5 September 2000	1.70 m (5 ft 7 in)
G	7	Janine Pontejos	33 – 29 October 1992	1.65 m (5 ft 5 in)	Akari Sparks	(Philippines)
C	8	Angelica Surada	25 – 5 May 2001	1.75 m (5 ft 9 in)
G	10	Hazelle Yam	28 – 20 October 1997
G	11	Stefanie Berberabe	26 – 13 July 2000	1.63 m (5 ft 4 in)	Rockingham Flames	(Australia)
G	12	Monique Del Carmen	28 – 21 December 1997
F	15	Jhazmin Joson	27 – 15 August 1999	1.70 m (5 ft 7 in)	Southern Tigers	(Australia)
F	20	Karl Pingol	24 – 14 October 2001
F	21	Camille Clarin	25 – 28 May 2001
G	25	Elizabeth Means (NP)	23 – 31 October 2002
F	45	Camille Malagar	24 – 10 March 2002

Head coach

- (Canada) BT Toews

Assistant coach(es)

- (Philippines) Raymond Austria
- (Philippines) Raiza Palmera-Dy

Legend

- (C) Team captain
- (NP) Naturalized player
- Club – describes last
  club before the tournament
- Age – describes age
  on 17 September 2026

=== Past rosters ===
- Note: Olympics, World Championships (World Cup), Asian Championships (Asia Cup), Asian Games and SEA Games only.

2010–2019

2020–present

=== Coaches ===
- (Philippines) Arlene Rodriguez (1989)
- (Philippines) Ricardo Roces (c. 1997)
- (Philippines) Arturo Cristobal (1999)
- (Philippines) Fritz Gaston (2003, 2007)
- (Philippines) Raymond Celis (2005)
- (Philippines) Haydee Ong (2008–2014)
- (Philippines) Patrick Aquino (2015–2026)
- (Canada) BT Toews (2026–present)
