= Cristina Columna =

Filipino basketball player (born 1964)

Personal information
- Born: December 5, 1964 (age 61)
- Listed height: 5 ft 3.5 in (1.61 m)

Career information
- College: PUP
- Position: Guard
Medals
Representing Philippines
Women's basketball
SEA Games
Bronze medal – third place	2001 Kuala Lumpur	Team
SEABA Championship
Silver medal – second place	1997 Bangkok	Team
Bronze medal – third place	1999 Genting	Team

Cristina Columna (born December 5, 1964) is a Filipina basketball former referee and player. A former Philippines women's national basketball team player, Columna is the first female international referee for FIBA from the Philippines.

== Playing career ==
=== Collegiate ===
Cristina Columna played for the women's basketball team of the Polytechnic University of the Philippines from 1982 to 1986 in the State Colleges and Universities Athletic Association (SCUAA) and the Philippine Integrated Colleges and Universities Athletic Association (PICUAA) She also received a scholarship to play for a school in Japan.

=== National team ===
Columna has played for the Philippines women's national basketball team. She debuted in 1987.

At the SEABA Championship for Women, Columna was part of the Philippine team which finished second and third in the 1997 and 1999 editions respectively.

Columna has played at the SEA Games six times. She was part of the team which won a bronze at the 2001 SEA Games.

== Refereeing career ==
In 2000, Columna became the first woman from the Philippines to become an international referee for FIBA. She was a member of the Basketball Referees Commission (BARECOM) which is affiliated with the Basketball Association of the Philippines. In 2021, she was inducted to the Women's National Basketball League's Legends Circle for this feat.
