= 1976 ABC Championship for Women =

Asian women's basketball tournament

1976 FIBA Women's Asia Cup
6th Asian Women's Basketball Championship

Tournament details
- Host country: Hong Kong
- Dates: November 2–12
- Teams: 7 (from all Asian federations)
- Venue: 1 (in 1 host city)

Final positions
- Champions: China (1st title)

The 1976 Asian Basketball Confederation Championship for Women were held in Hong Kong.

== Results ==
Team	Pld	W	L	PF	PA	PD	Pts
China	6	6	0	586	282	+304	12
South Korea	6	5	1	688	231	+457	11
Japan	6	4	2	449	348	+101	10
Malaysia	6	3	3	346	526	−180	9
Singapore	6	2	4	289	467	−178	8
Philippines	6	1	5	304	561	−257	7
Hong Kong	6	0	6	295	542	−247	6

November 2

Hong Kong	57–67	Philippines
Scoring by half: 22–35, 35–32

Macpherson Stadium, Hong Kong

November 2

China	97–37	Singapore
Scoring by half: 54–15, 43–22

Macpherson Stadium, Hong Kong

November 3

Hong Kong	51–107	Japan
Scoring by half: 28–49, 23–58

Macpherson Stadium, Hong Kong

November 3

Singapore	23–103	South Korea
Scoring by half: 10–43, 13–60

Macpherson Stadium, Hong Kong

November 3

Philippines	50–118	China
Scoring by half: 14–55, 36–63

Macpherson Stadium, Hong Kong

November 4

South Korea	124–30	Hong Kong
Scoring by half: 62–12, 62–18

Macpherson Stadium, Hong Kong

November 4

Philippines	48–93	Japan
Scoring by half: 22–36, 26–57

Macpherson Stadium, Hong Kong

November 4

Malaysia	72–70	Singapore
Scoring by half: 33–29, 39–41

Macpherson Stadium, Hong Kong

November 6

Malaysia	78–65	Philippines
Scoring by half: 42–26, 36–39

Macpherson Stadium, Hong Kong

November 6

Singapore	36–83	Japan
Scoring by half: 19–58, 17–25

Macpherson Stadium, Hong Kong

November 6

Hong Kong	36–119	China
Scoring by half: 24–51, 12–68

Macpherson Stadium, Hong Kong

November 7

Singapore	66–63 (OT)	Hong Kong
Scoring by half: 31–34, 24–21 Overtime: 11–8

Macpherson Stadium, Hong Kong

November 7

South Korea	132–31	Malaysia
Scoring by half: 66–15, 66–16

Macpherson Stadium, Hong Kong

November 7

Japan	33–62	China
Scoring by half: 10–28, 23–34

Macpherson Stadium, Hong Kong

November 8

Philippines	25–158	South Korea
Scoring by half: 13–74, 12–84

Macpherson Stadium, Hong Kong

November 8

Malaysia	59–58	Hong Kong
Scoring by half: 29–27, 30–31

Macpherson Stadium, Hong Kong

November 10

Singapore	57–49	Philippines
Scoring by half: 29–33, 28–16

Macpherson Stadium, Hong Kong

November 10

China	117–58	Malaysia
Scoring by half: 55–18, 62–40

Macpherson Stadium, Hong Kong

November 10

Japan	49–103	South Korea
Scoring by half: 20–54, 29–49

Macpherson Stadium, Hong Kong

November 12

Japan	84–48	Malaysia
Scoring by half: 55–25, 29–23

Macpherson Stadium, Hong Kong

November 12

China	73–68	South Korea
Scoring by half: 31–43, 42–25

Macpherson Stadium, Hong Kong

== Final standing ==
Rank	Team	Record
1st place, gold medalist(s)	China	6–0
2nd place, silver medalist(s)	South Korea	5–1
3rd place, bronze medalist(s)	Japan	4–2
4	Malaysia	3–3
5	Singapore	2–4
6	Philippines	1–5
7	Hong Kong	0–6

== Awards ==
1976 Asian champions

China
First title
