= Basketball at the 2015 SEA Games – Women's tournament =

Tournament details
- Host country: Singapore
- Dates: 9–15 June
- Teams: 6 (from 6 federations)
- Venue: 1 (in 1 host city)

Final positions
- Champions: Malaysia (13th title)

The women's basketball tournament at the 2015 SEA Games was held in Kallang, Singapore at the OCBC Arena Hall 1 from 9 to 15 June.

The official detailed schedule for the tournament was announced on 30 April 2015.

== Draw ==
The draw was held on 30 April 2015 at the OCBC Arena Hall 1 during the 2015 SEABA Championship for men's team. All participating teams were drawn into one group.

== Team rosters ==
At the start of tournament, all six participating countries had up to 12 players on their rosters.

- Indonesia
- Singapore
- Philippines
- Malaysia
- Thailand
- Vietnam

== Competition format ==
- Round robin; the team with the best record wins the gold medal.

== Results ==
All times are Singapore Standard Time (UTC+8)

Pos	Team	Pld	W	L	PF	PA	PD	Pts	Final Result
1	Malaysia	5	4	1	345	264	+81	9	Gold medal
2	Indonesia	5	4	1	299	265	+34	9	Silver medal
3	Thailand	5	3	2	327	263	+64	8	Bronze medal
4	Philippines	5	3	2	369	313	+56	8	
5	Singapore (H)	5	1	4	323	358	−35	6	
6	Vietnam	5	0	5	206	361	−155	5	

Source: Seagames 2015
Rules for classification: (1) Tournament points, (2) Head-to-head tournament points, (3) Head-to-head goal average, (4) Overall goal average, (5) Drawing of lots
(H) Hosts

9 June 2015
9:00

Report

Thailand	62–57	Philippines
Scoring by quarter: 15–15, 17–8, 11–12, 19–22
Pts: Jantakan 20; Rebs: Jantakan, Mathuros 9 Asts: Phromrat 4		Pts: Bernardino 19; Rebs: Almazan 15; Asts: Bernardo, Jose, Resultay 2

OCBC Arena Hall 1, Kallang
Referees: Tan Yee Nee (SIN), Chu Chu Wei Chuen (MAS), Senhal Vidyadhar Bendke (IND)

9 June 2015
13:00

Report

Malaysia	70–45	Indonesia
Scoring by quarter: 9–19, 19–8, 23–13, 19–5
Pts: Pang H.P. 19; Rebs: Pang H.P., Yaakob 8 Asts: Saw W.Y. 5		Pts: Ibo 10; Rebs: Anggraini 10; Asts: Ibo, Anggraini, Ningrum 2

OCBC Arena Hall 1, Kallang
Referees: Ricor Buaron (PHI), Nattapong Jontapa (THA), Lei Siman (CHN)

9 June 2015
18:00

Report

Vietnam	58–99	Singapore
Scoring by quarter: 17–40, 9–24, 12–15, 20–20
Pts: Trat 16; Rebs: Hyunh 11; Asts: B. Pham, Hyunh, Linh 2		Pts: Tan 32; Rebs: A. Lim 11; Asts: 5 players 4

OCBC Arena Hall 1, Kallang
Referees: Thongcai Thaweewutsophon (THA), Lwin Htoo Wai (MYA), Kim Bo-Hui (KOR)

10 June 2015
9:00

Report

Philippines	100–55	Vietnam
Scoring by quarter: 20–13, 16–16, 32–11, 32–15
Pts: Lim 17; Rebs: Bernardino, Castro 7 Asts: Arayi 7		Pts: Huynh 15; Rebs: Trat 6 Asts: Trat 4

OCBC Arena Hall 1, Kallang
Referees: Nattapong Jontapa (THA), Xin Wu (SIN), Budi Marfan (INA)

10 June 2015
16:00

Report

Malaysia	65–56	Thailand
Scoring by quarter: 13–16, 13–11, 16–15, 23–14
Pts: Pang H.P. 15; Rebs: Saw W.Y. 7 Asts: Yaakob 4		Pts: Jantakan 14; Rebs: Phromrat 10; Asts: Jantakan 7

OCBC Arena Hall 1, Kallang
Referees: Senhal Vidyadhar Bendke (IND), Naing Phyo Win (MYA), Kim Bo-Hui (KOR)

10 June 2015
18:00

Report

Singapore	67–70	Indonesia
Scoring by quarter: 10–23, 15–11, 22–23, 20–13
Pts: Lim J.M. 18; Rebs: Poon 7 Asts: Koh W.B. 3		Pts: Christaline 22; Rebs: Ibo 16; Asts: Anggraini 2

OCBC Arena Hall 1, Kallang
Referees: Yuen Chun Yip (CHN), Htoo Wai Lwin (MYA), Lei Siman (CHN)

11 June 2015
9:00

Report

Philippines	74–63	Malaysia
Scoring by quarter: 13–18, 17–12, 21–19, 23–14
Pts: Lim 20; Rebs: Lim 13; Asts: Almazan, Bernardino, Gupilan 2		Pts: Rajintiran 12; Rebs: Rajintiran 7 Asts: Pang H.P. 7

OCBC Arena Hall 1, Kallang
Referees: Donald Francis Quinn (SIN), Senhal Vidyadhar Bendke (IND), Poh Seng Goh (SIN)

11 June 2015
13:00

Report

Indonesia	71–26	Vietnam
Scoring by quarter: 22–9, 17–2, 14–10, 18–5
Pts: Anggraini 14; Rebs: Ningrum 8 Asts: Retong 6		Pts: Trat 6 Rebs: Huynh, Pham 5 Asts: 4 players 1

OCBC Arena Hall 1, Kallang
Referees: Yee Nee Tan (SIN), Htoo Wai Lwin (MYA), Bohui Kim (KOR)

11 June 2015
18:00

Report

Thailand	83–46	Singapore
Scoring by quarter: 19–14, 20–4, 20–15, 24–13
Pts: Yothanan 13; Rebs: Yothanan 7 Asts: Jantakan, Phromrat, Janthabut 4		Pts: Poon 10; Rebs: Lim J.M. 6 Asts: Yoshida 3

OCBC Arena Hall 1, Kallang
Referees: Joenard Garcia (PHI), Naing Phyo Win (MYA), Lei Si Man (CHN)

12 June 2015
12:00

Report

Indonesia	61–56	Philippines
Scoring by quarter: 9–21, 18–8, 19–9, 15–18
Pts: Christaline 19; Rebs: Sophia 17; Asts: Retong 3		Pts: Palmera 12; Rebs: Bernardino 10; Asts: Almazan 3

OCBC Arena Hall 1, Kallang
Referees: Senhal Vidyadhar Bendke (IND), Lei Si Man (CHN), Bohui Kim (KOR)

13 June 2015
10:00

Report

Vietnam	43–80	Thailand
Scoring by quarter: 10–24, 9–25, 15–9, 9–22
Pts: B. Nguyen 10; Rebs: Huynh 9 Asts: B. Pham 3		Pts: Jantakan 17; Rebs: Kunchuan 11; Asts: Yothanan 5

OCBC Arena Hall 1, Kallang
Referees: Senhal Vidyadhar Bendke (IND), Yee Nee Tan (SIN), Bohui Kim (KOR)

13 June 2015
20:00

Report

Malaysia	65–39	Singapore
Scoring by quarter: 17–9, 15–8, 16–12, 17–10
Pts: Yap F.Y., Ting 10; Rebs: Saw W.Y. 8 Asts: Yaakob 6		Pts: Poon 12; Rebs: A. Lim 12; Asts: Koh W.B. 3

OCBC Arena Hall 1, Kallang
Referees: Chuang Chih-Chun (TPE), Joenard Garcia (PHI), Lei Siman (CHN)

14 June 2015
14:00

Report

Thailand	46–52	Indonesia
Scoring by quarter: 10–9, 11–14, 14–20, 11–9
Pts: Jantakan 13; Rebs: Kunchuan, Yothanan 8 Asts: Jantakan 3		Pts: Herawan 15; Rebs: Anggraini 8 Asts: Putri 2

OCBC Arena Hall 1, Kallang
Referees: Lei Si Man (CHN), Bohui Kim (KOR), Senhal Vidyadhar Bendke (IND)

15 June 2015
12:00

Report

Vietnam	50–82	Malaysia
Scoring by quarter: 16–24, 6–17, 14–17, 14–24
Pts: Trat 14; Rebs: Trat 9 Asts: Hyunh 4		Pts: Rajintiran 14; Rebs: 4 players 4 Asts: Pang H.P. 5

OCBC Arena Hall 1, Kallang
Referees: Yee Nee Tan (SIN), Xin Wu (SIN), Lei Si Man (CHN)

15 June 2015
14:00

Report

Singapore	72–82	Philippines
Scoring by quarter: 26–18, 12–19, 18–23, 16–22
Pts: Poon 17; Rebs: Lim 8 Asts: Koh 5		Pts: Bernardino, Lim 17; Rebs: Bernardino 8 Asts: Arayi 3

OCBC Arena Hall 1, Kallang
Referees: Senhal Vidyadhar Bendke (IND), Htoo Wai Lwin (MYA), Bohui Kim (KOR)

=== Final standing ===
Rank	Team
1st place, gold medalist(s)	Malaysia
2nd place, silver medalist(s)	Indonesia
3rd place, bronze medalist(s)	Thailand
4	Philippines
5	Singapore
6	Vietnam

== See also ==
- Men's tournament
