= Basketball at the 2021 SEA Games – Women's tournament =

Women's basketball tournament at the 2021 SEA Games
- Venue: Thanh Trì District Sporting Hall, Hanoi
- Dates: 16–22 May 2022
- Nations: 6

The women's basketball tournament at the 2021 SEA Games was held at the Thanh Trì District Sporting Hall in Hanoi, Vietnam from 16 to 22 May 2022.

== Competition schedule ==
The following is the competition schedule for the women's basketball competitions:

RR	Round-robin

Mon 16	Tue 17	Wed 18	Thu 19	Fri 20	Sat 21	Sun 22
RR		RR	RR		RR	RR

== Participating nations ==
- Indonesia
- Malaysia
- Philippines
- Singapore
- Thailand
- Vietnam

== Competition format ==
There is no official draw since only 6 teams participating in this competition. The six teams compete in a single round-robin. Three highest-ranked teams will be awarded gold, silver and bronze medal.

== Venue ==
The regular 5-on-5 basketball tournament was held at the Thanh Trì District Sporting Hall in Hanoi.

== Results ==
=== Round-robin ===
All times are Vietnam Standard Time (UTC+7)

Pos	Team	Pld	W	L	PF	PA	PD	Pts	Final Result
1	Philippines	5	4	1	491	402	+89	9	Gold medal
2	Indonesia	5	4	1	403	342	+61	9	Silver medal
3	Malaysia	5	3	2	355	336	+19	8	Bronze medal
4	Thailand	5	2	3	378	358	+20	7	
5	Vietnam (H)	5	2	3	384	405	−21	7	
6	Singapore	5	0	5	243	411	−168	5	

Source: 2021 SEA Games
Rules for classification: (1) Tournament points, (2) Head-to-head tournament points, (3) Head-to-head goal average, (4) Overall goal average, (5) Drawing of lots
(H) Hosts

16 May 2022
09:00

Box Score

Philippines	93–77	Indonesia
Scoring by quarter: 17–17, 23–21, 32–19, 21–20
Pts: Bernardino 16; Rebs: Bernardino 9 Asts: Cabinbin 7		Pts: Orville 19; Rebs: Lestari 10; Asts: Wongsohardjo, Dewi 5

Thanh Trì District Sporting Hall, Hanoi

16 May 2022
13:00

Box Score

Thailand	67–70	Malaysia
Scoring by quarter: 25–11, 7–23, 25–18, 10–18
Pts: Kitraksa 18; Rebs: Sriharaksa 10; Asts: Bunsinprom, Supyen 3		Pts: Yaakob 14; Rebs: Pang 9 Asts: Pang 9

Thanh Trì District Sporting Hall, Hanoi

16 May 2022
17:00

Box Score

Singapore	51–73	Vietnam
Scoring by quarter: 15–11, 11–22, 14–27, 10–13
Pts: Lim J.M. 16; Rebs: Al. Lim 14; Asts: Chu, Al. Lim 3		Pts: Đào 19; Rebs: Huỳnh 12; Asts: Trương T.V. 8

Thanh Trì District Sporting Hall, Hanoi

18 May 2022
09:00

Box Score

Thailand	81–97	Philippines
Scoring by quarter: 16–22, 24–35, 19–23, 22–17
Pts: Lumdabpang 14; Rebs: 3 players 5 Asts: Bunsinprom 4		Pts: Bernardino 20; Rebs: Bernardino 16; Asts: Bade 4

Thanh Trì District Sporting Hall, Hanoi

18 May 2022
13:00

Box Score

Malaysia	72–37	Singapore
Scoring by quarter: 13–6, 24–6, 20–11, 15–14
Pts: Rajintiran 12; Rebs: Chong 8 Asts: 3 players 2		Pts: Al. Lim 7 Rebs: Han 7 Asts: Chu 2

Thanh Trì District Sporting Hall, Hanoi

18 May 2022
17:00

Box Score

Vietnam	80–93	Indonesia
Scoring by quarter: 19–16, 21–35, 12–19, 28–23
Pts: Trương T.V. 26; Rebs: Trương T.V. 6 Asts: Trương T.V. 10		Pts: Pierre-Louis 36; Rebs: Pierre-Louis 23; Asts: Wongsohardjo, Retong 5

Thanh Trì District Sporting Hall, Hanoi

19 May 2022
09:00

Box Score

Singapore	40–91	Thailand
Scoring by quarter: 14–15, 6–20, 10–30, 10–26
Pts: Chan 8 Rebs: Al. Lim 9 Asts: Han, Al. Lim 2		Pts: Udomsuk 16; Rebs: Kaichaiyafoom, Lumdabpang 9 Asts: Jantakan, Maihom 3

Thanh Trì District Sporting Hall, Hanoi

19 May 2022
13:00

Box Score

Indonesia	70–52	Malaysia
Scoring by quarter: 21–12, 14–18, 17–17, 18–5
Pts: Pierre-Louis 25; Rebs: Pierre-Louis 14; Asts: 3 players 3		Pts: Yap 17; Rebs: Rajintiran 12; Asts: Pang 4

Thanh Trì District Sporting Hall, Hanoi

19 May 2022
17:00

Box Score

Vietnam	87–118	Philippines
Scoring by quarter: 20–40, 15–18, 27–32, 25–28
Pts: Trương T.V. 30; Rebs: Trương T.V., Nguyễn T.T.D. 6 Asts: Đào 4		Pts: Castillo 25; Rebs: Bernardino 12; Asts: Berberabe 10

Thanh Trì District Sporting Hall, Hanoi

21 May 2022
09:00

Box Score

Philippines	88–61	Singapore
Scoring by quarter: 18–6, 22–15, 28–16, 22–24
Pts: Castro 15; Rebs: Bernardino 8 Asts: 3 players 3		Pts: Chu 16; Rebs: Ang 6 Asts: Al. Lim, Lim J.M. 3

Thanh Trì District Sporting Hall, Hanoi

21 May 2022
13:00

Box Score

Thailand	64–76	Indonesia
Scoring by quarter: 28–19, 18–19, 13–18, 5–20
Pts: Kitraksa 18; Rebs: Lumdabpang 5 Asts: Bunsinprom 4		Pts: Pierre-Louis 21; Rebs: Pierre-Louis 16; Asts: Retong 7

Thanh Trì District Sporting Hall, Hanoi

21 May 2022
17:00

Box Score

Malaysia	65–69	Vietnam
Scoring by quarter: 19–10, 17–21, 13–23, 16–15
Pts: Yap 22; Rebs: Pang 11; Asts: Ting 5		Pts: Trương T.V. 22; Rebs: Trương T.V. 7 Asts: Trương T.V. 7

Thanh Trì District Sporting Hall, Hanoi

22 May 2022
09:00

Box Score

Malaysia	96–93	Philippines
Scoring by quarter: 25–28, 33–26, 19–17, 19–22
Pts: Chong, Yap 25; Rebs: Pang 10; Asts: Saw 7		Pts: Pontejos 18; Rebs: Bernardino, Bade 7 Asts: Cabinbin 5

Thanh Trì District Sporting Hall, Hanoi

22 May 2022
13:00

Box Score

Indonesia	87–53	Singapore
Scoring by quarter: 22–8, 21–4, 26–18, 18–23
Pts: Pierre-Louis 22; Rebs: Pierre-Louis 10; Asts: Putri 5		Pts: See 18; Rebs: 5 players 4 Asts: Choong 4

Thanh Trì District Sporting Hall, Hanoi

22 May 2022
17:00

Box Score

Vietnam	75–78	Thailand
'Scoring by quarter: 22–23, 18–21, 19–20, 16–14
Pts: Trương T.M. 27; Rebs: 5 players 6 Asts: Trương T.M. 6		Pts: Kitraksa, Prajuapsook 15; Rebs: Prajuapsook 11; Asts: Bunsinprom 6

Thanh Trì District Sporting Hall, Hanoi

== Final standings ==
Rank	Team
1st place, gold medalist(s)	Philippines
2nd place, silver medalist(s)	Indonesia
3rd place, bronze medalist(s)	Malaysia
4	Thailand
5	Vietnam
6	Singapore

== See also ==
- Men's tournament
