= Basketball at the 2025 SEA Games – Women's tournament =

Women's basketball tournament at the 2025 SEA Games
- Venue: 1
- Dates: 13–19 December 2025
- Competitors: 6 from 6 nations

Medalists
gold medal	Philippines
silver medal	Thailand
bronze medal	Indonesia

The women's basketball tournament at the 2025 SEA Games was held at the Nimibutr Stadium in Bangkok, Thailand from 13 to 19 December 2025.

Naturalized players as well as any other player who obtained the relevant passport after age 16 are not eligible to play.

== Participating nations ==
- Indonesia
- Malaysia
- Philippines
- Singapore
- Thailand
- Vietnam

== Results ==
All times are Indochina Time (UTC+7)

=== Preliminary round ===
==== Group A ====
Pos	Team	Pld	W	L	PF	PA	PD	Pts	Qualification
1	Thailand (H)	2	2	0	149	101	+48	4	Advance to Semifinals
2	Indonesia	2	1	1	136	98	+38	3	Qualification to Quarterfinals
3	Vietnam	2	0	2	84	170	−86	2	Qualification to Quarterfinals

Source: Basketball - 5x5 Schedule & Results
(H) Hosts

13 December 2025
16:30

Results

Vietnam	38–81	Indonesia
Scoring by quarter: 7−21, 10−23, 12−19, 9−18

Nimibutr Stadium, Bangkok
Referees: Huang Yun-Hsuan (TPE), Mandy Ngieng Sing Tong (MAS), Michelle Chian Yie Tsen (SGP)

14 December 2025
16:30

Results

Indonesia	55–60	Thailand
Scoring by quarter: 9−13, 10−20, 16−16, 20−11

Nimibutr Stadium, Bangkok

15 December 2025
16:30

Results

Thailand	89–46	Vietnam
Scoring by quarter: 21−13, 24−17, 21−5, 23−11

Nimibutr Stadium, Bangkok

==== Group B ====
Pos	Team	Pld	W	L	PF	PA	PD	Pts	Qualification
1	Philippines	2	2	0	168	126	+42	4	Advance to Semifinals
2	Malaysia	2	1	1	137	110	+27	3	Qualification to Quarterfinals
3	Singapore	2	0	2	93	162	−69	2	Qualification to Quarterfinals

Source: Basketball - 5x5 Schedule & Results

13 December 2025
09:00

Results

Malaysia	67–76	Philippines
Scoring by quarter: 18−18, 22−18, 20−20, 7−20

Nimibutr Stadium, Bangkok

14 December 2025
09:00

Results

Philippines	92–59	Singapore
Scoring by quarter: 25−18, 16−10, 25−18, 26−13

Nimibutr Stadium, Bangkok

15 December 2025
09:00

Results

Singapore	34–70	Malaysia
Scoring by quarter: 8−20, 7−18, 13−20, 6−12

Nimibutr Stadium, Bangkok

=== Knockout round ===
Quarterfinals
A2	Indonesia	77
B3	Singapore	37
B2	Malaysia	83
A3	Vietnam	44

Semifinals
B1	Philippines	66
A2	Indonesia	55
A1	Thailand	59
B2	Malaysia	51

Final
B1	Philippines	73
A1	Thailand	70
Third place
A2	Indonesia	62
B2	Malaysia	55

==== Quarterfinals ====
17 December 2025
11:30

Results

Indonesia	77–37	Singapore
Scoring by quarter: 18−11, 12−4, 26−5, 21−17

Nimibutr Stadium, Bangkok

17 December 2025
14:00

Results

Malaysia	83–44	Vietnam
Scoring by quarter: 16−12, 20−15, 26−7, 21−10

Nimibutr Stadium, Bangkok

==== Fifth place game ====
18 December 2025
9:00

Results

Singapore	57–58	Vietnam
Scoring by quarter: 24–19, 19–10, 4–17, 10–12

Nimibutr Stadium, Bangkok

==== Semifinals ====
18 December 2025
11:30

Results
Box Scores

Philippines	66–55	Indonesia
Scoring by quarter: 30−16, 13−19, 12−9, 11−11
Pts: Dela Rosa 21; Rebs: Dela Rosa 11; Asts: 4 players 2		Pts: Wongsohardjo 18; Rebs: Wongsohardjo 13; Asts: Wongsohardjo 4

Nimibutr Stadium, Bangkok
Attendance: 500
Referees: Huang Yun-Hsuan (TPE), Suebpong Wichaiphin (THA), Michelle Chian Yie Tsen (SGP)

18 December 2025
16:30

Results

Thailand	59–51	Malaysia
Scoring by quarter: 21−17, 13−9, 16−19, 9−6

Nimibutr Stadium, Bangkok

==== Bronze medal match ====
19 December 2025
11:30

Results

Malaysia	55–62	Indonesia
Scoring by quarter: 12−15, 8−20, 19−13, 16−14

Nimibutr Stadium, Bangkok

==== Gold medal match ====
19 December 2025
16:30

Results

Thailand	70–73	Philippines
Scoring by quarter: 19−22, 24−28, 15−15, 12−8

Nimibutr Stadium, Bangkok

== Final standings ==
Rank	Team
1st place, gold medalist(s)	Philippines
2nd place, silver medalist(s)	Thailand
3rd place, bronze medalist(s)	Indonesia
4	Malaysia
5	Vietnam
6	Singapore

== See also ==
- Men's tournament
