= Kelly Hardeman =

Filipino-born American basketball player

Personal information
- Born: February 25, 1994 (age 32) Quezon City, Philippines
- Listed height: 6 ft 0 in (1.83 m)

Career information
- High school: Faith Academy
- College: Azusa Pacific University

Career history
- 2016–2017: BK Amager

Kelly Hardeman is a Philippine-born American basketball player.

== Early life and education ==
Hardeman was born on February 25, 1994 to American missionary parents at the St. Luke's Medical Center in Quezon City, Philippines. She spent her childhood in Antipolo, Rizal where she attended Faith Academy for her high school studies.

She went to the United States to study at the Azusa Pacific University for her collegiate studies.

== Basketball career ==
=== Early career ===
Hardeman played basketball for her high school, Faith Academy. After her high school stint, she was scouted by Patrick Aquino who convinced her to play for the National University varsity team. However, she opted to play collegiate basketball in the United States instead with Azusa Pacific University. She averaged 19.1 points, 9.6 rebounds, and 2.1 blocks playing with Azusa in the Pacific West Conference of the National Collegiate Athletic Association Division II.

=== Azusa Pacific statistics ===
Legend
GP	Games played	GS	Games started	MPG	Minutes per game
FG%	Field goal percentage	3P%	3-point field goal percentage	FT%	Free throw percentage
RPG	Rebounds per game	APG	Assists per game	SPG	Steals per game
BPG	Blocks per game	PPG	Points per game	**Bold**	Career high

Year	Team	GP	Points	FG%	3P%	FT%	RPG	APG	SPG	BPG	PPG
2012–13	Azusa Pacific	27	358	39.4%	34.2%	76.0%	6.9	0.8	1.5	1.7	13.3
2013–14	Azusa Pacific	27	381	38.0%	32.1%	63.9%	7.9	**1.7**	**1.9**	1.1	14.1
2014–15	Azusa Pacific	29	553	38.2%	31.7%	**79.7%**	**9.9**	1.3	1.3	**2.0**	**19.1**
2015–16	Azusa Pacific	**32**	555	**44.5%**	**38.3%**	54.3%	9.2	1.3	1.8	1.4	17.3
Career		115	1847	40.2%	34.2%	70.6%	8.5	1.3	1.6	1.6	16.1

=== Professional ===
She played with Danish club BK Amager in the EuroLeague. A starting player, she averaged 14.4 points and 10.5 rebounds.

=== International ===
The handlers of the Philippines women's national basketball team has been campaigning for the granting of Hardeman, Filipino citizenship through naturalization so she could be eligible to play for the national team.
