= 2010 SEABA Championship for Women =

7th Southeast Asian Women's Basketball Championship
- Official Logo

Tournament details
- Host country: Philippines
- Dates: October 24–29
- Teams: 5 (from 5 federations)
- Venue: 1 (in 1 host city)

Final positions
- Champions: Philippines (1st title)

Tournament statistics
- Top scorer: (Indonesia) Wati (17.0)
- Top rebounds: (Philippines) Tolentino (8.5)
- Top assists: (Thailand) Saechua (6.0)
- PPG (Team): Thailand (84.0)
- RPG (Team): Philippines (45.0)
- APG (Team): Philippines (20.0)

Official website
- 2010 7th SEABA Championship for Women

The 2010 SEABA Championship for Women is the qualifying tournament for Southeast Asia Basketball Association at the 2011 FIBA Asia Championship for Women. The tournament was held in Manila, Philippines from October 24 to October 29.

The Philippines swept all of their assignments en route to their maiden championship title and avenged their loss to the defending champions Thailand at the 2007 SEABA Championship for Women.

== Elimination round ==
=== Round robin ===
Pos	Team	Pld	W	L	PF	PA	PD	Pts	Qualification
1	Philippines (H)	4	4	0	242	119	+123	8	Final
2	Thailand	4	3	1	279	161	+118	7	Final
3	Malaysia	4	2	2	272	254	+18	6	Third place game
4	Indonesia	4	1	3	226	345	−119	5	Third place game
5	Singapore	4	0	4	199	339	−140	4	

(H) Hosts

October 24
13:00

Report

Indonesia	60–84	Malaysia
Scoring by quarter: 10–21, 19–17, 23–24, 8–22
Pts: Wati 22; Rebs: Wati 7 Asts: Ningrum 4		Pts: Teo W.Y. 19; Rebs: Teo W.Y. 8 Asts: Saw W.Y., Kew S.M. 5

Ninoy Aquino Stadium, Rizal Memorial Sports Complex, Manila
Referees: Francisco Olivar, Dumrongkiat Mungmit, Yee Nee Tan

October 24
15:45

Report

Philippines	101–34	Singapore
Scoring by quarter: 19–7, 25–5, 29–17, 28–5
Pts: Tolentino 19; Rebs: Tolentino 10; Asts: Tolentino 5		Pts: Jy. Tan 16; Rebs: Jy. Tan 6 Asts: Koh W.B. 3

Ninoy Aquino Stadium, Rizal Memorial Sports Complex, Manila
Referees: Sedyo Wibowo, Padungratchadakit Watcharin, Fan Chong Chen

October 25
14:00

Report

Singapore	61–70	Indonesia
Scoring by quarter: 17–12, 17–20, 15–13, 12–25
Pts: Jy. Tan 15; Rebs: Koh W.B. 11; Asts: Koh W.B. 7		Pts: Wati 25; Rebs: Dwi Maya Siswari 14; Asts: Ningrum 10

Ninoy Aquino Stadium, Rizal Memorial Sports Complex, Manila
Referees: Dominique Pomar, Kho Lee Kwak, Padungratchadakit Watcharin

October 25
16:00

Report

Malaysia	64–78	Thailand
Scoring by quarter: 21–17, 8–22, 19–22, 16–17
Pts: Kew S.M. 17; Rebs: Kew S.M. 10; Asts: Saw W.Y., Teo W.Y. 5		Pts: Banmoo 17; Rebs: Jy. Tan 8 Asts: Saechua, Chirdpetcharat 4

Ninoy Aquino Stadium, Rizal Memorial Sports Complex, Manila
Referees: Poh Seng Goh, Sedyo Wibowo, Glenn Cornelio

October 26
14:00

Report

Thailand	118–50	Indonesia
Scoring by quarter: 39–9, 23–11, 26–16, 30–14
Pts: Suksomwong 29; Rebs: Mathuros 8 Asts: Saechua 11		Pts: Marina 12; Rebs: Marina 7 Asts: Debby 4

Ninoy Aquino Stadium, Rizal Memorial Sports Complex, Manila
Referees: Francisco Olivar, Fan Chong Chen, Yee Nee Tan

October 26
16:00

Report

Philippines	59–39	Malaysia
Scoring by quarter: 10–5, 10–13, 20–14, 19–7
Pts: Jacob, Tioseco 15; Rebs: Tioseco 9 Asts: Grajales 5		Pts: Pang H.P. 17; Rebs: Yong S.M. 6 Asts: Kew S.M. 4

Ninoy Aquino Stadium, Rizal Memorial Sports Complex, Manila
Referees: Dumrongkiat Mungmit, Sedyo Wibowo, Padungratchadakit Watcharin

October 27
14:00

Report

Thailand	83–47	Singapore
Scoring by quarter: 32–21, 21–9, 13–7, 17–10
Pts: Panurushthanon 16; Rebs: Mathuros 8 Asts: Saechua 6		Pts: Jy. Tan 14; Rebs: Jy. Tan 9 Asts: Koh W.B. 4

Ninoy Aquino Stadium, Rizal Memorial Sports Complex, Manila
Referees: Fan Chong Chen, Sedyo Wibowo, Dominique Pomar

October 27
16:00

Report

Indonesia	46–82	Philippines
Scoring by quarter: 13–17, 13–16, 6–24, 14-25
Pts: Wati 14; Rebs: Ningrum 6 Asts: Ningrum 7		Pts: Jose 15; Rebs: Tolentino 14; Asts: Grajales 5

Ninoy Aquino Stadium, Rizal Memorial Sports Complex, Manila
Referees: Padungratchadakit Watcharin, Yee Nee Tan, Kho Lee Kwok

October 28
14:00

Report

Singapore	57–85	Malaysia
Scoring by quarter: 32–21, 21–9, 13–7, 17–10
Pts: Jy. Tan 15; Rebs: Jy. Tan 8 Asts: Sunarko 8		Pts: Kew S.M. 20; Rebs: Saw W.Y. 7 Asts: Teo W.Y. 5

Ninoy Aquino Stadium, Rizal Memorial Sports Complex, Manila
Referees: Glenn Cornelio, Francisco Olivar, Dumrongkiat Mungmit

October 28
16:00

Report

Philippines	83–57	Thailand
Scoring by quarter: 16–17, 27–19, 22–13, 18-8
Pts: Arayi 12; Rebs: Tolentino 8 Asts: Mercado 5		Pts: Chirdpetcharat 11; Rebs: Sangkhum 5 Asts: Mathuros 5

Ninoy Aquino Stadium, Rizal Memorial Sports Complex, Manila
Referees: Sedyo Wibowo, Kho Lee Kwok, Yee Nee Tan

== Bronze-medal match ==
October 29
14:00

Report

Malaysia	91–61	Indonesia
Scoring by quarter: 15–7, 19–19, 29–17, 28–18
Pts: Pang H.P., Kew S.M. 15; Rebs: Yong S.M. 10; Asts: Saw W.Y. 11		Pts: Wati 16; Rebs: Debby 8 Asts: Ningrum 6

Ninoy Aquino Stadium, Rizal Memorial Sports Complex, Manila
Referees: Francisco Olivar, Yee Nee Tan, Padungratchadakit Watcharin

== Gold-medal match ==
October 29
16:00

Report

Thailand	54–76	Philippines
Scoring by quarter: 9–17, 27–20, 9–18, 9–21
Pts: Suksomwong 21; Rebs: Saechua 8 Asts: Chirdpetcharat 6		Pts: Grajales 14; Rebs: Jacob 7 Asts: Grajales 6

Ninoy Aquino Stadium, Rizal Memorial Sports Complex, Manila
Referees: Sedyo Wibowo, Poh Seng Goh, Fan Chong Chen

== Final standings ==
Rank	Team
Gold medal	Philippines
Silver medal	Thailand
Bronze medal	Malaysia
4	Indonesia
5	Singapore

== Awards ==
2010 SEABA champions

Philippines
First title
