= 1982 ABC Championship for Women =

1982 FIBA Women's Asia Cup
9th Asian Women's Basketball Championship

Tournament details
- Host country: Japan
- Dates: April 28 – May 5
- Teams: 9 (from all Asian federations)
- Venue: 1 (in 1 host city)

Final positions
- Champions: South Korea (7th title)

The 1982 Asian Basketball Confederation Championship for Women were held in Tokyo, Japan.

== Preliminary round ==
=== Group A ===
| Team | Pld | W | L | PF | PA | PD | Pts |
|---|---|---|---|---|---|---|---|
| South Korea | 2 | 2 | 0 | 287 | 83 | +204 | 4 |
| Malaysia | 2 | 1 | 1 | 88 | 185 | −97 | 3 |
| India | 2 | 0 | 2 | 85 | 192 | −107 | 2 |

April 28

| Malaysia | 47–43 | India |
Scoring by half: 24–22, 23–21

Yoyogi National Gymnasium, Tokyo

April 29

| South Korea | 142–41 | Malaysia |
Scoring by half: 85–23, 57–18

Yoyogi National Gymnasium, Tokyo

April 30

| India | 42–145 | South Korea |
Scoring by half: 12–74, 30–71

Yoyogi National Gymnasium, Tokyo

=== Group B ===
| Team | Pld | W | L | PF | PA | PD | Pts |
|---|---|---|---|---|---|---|---|
| China | 2 | 2 | 0 | 305 | 53 | +252 | 4 |
| Macau | 2 | 1 | 1 | 86 | 231 | −145 | 3 |
| Hong Kong | 2 | 0 | 2 | 93 | 200 | −107 | 2 |

April 28

| China | 173–18 | Macau |
Scoring by half: 88–6, 85–12

Yoyogi National Gymnasium, Tokyo

April 29

| Macau | 68–58 | Hong Kong |
Scoring by half: 33–28, 35–30

Yoyogi National Gymnasium, Tokyo

April 30

| Hong Kong | 35–132 | China |
Scoring by half: 22–71, 13–61

Yoyogi National Gymnasium, Tokyo

=== Group C ===
| Team | Pld | W | L | PF | PA | PD | Pts |
|---|---|---|---|---|---|---|---|
| Japan | 2 | 2 | 0 | 275 | 70 | +205 | 4 |
| Singapore | 2 | 1 | 1 | 92 | 202 | −110 | 3 |
| Philippines | 2 | 0 | 2 | 113 | 208 | −95 | 2 |

April 28

| Singapore | 21–138 | Japan |
Scoring by half: 7–82, 14–56

Yoyogi National Gymnasium, Tokyo

April 29

| Japan | 137–49 | Philippines |
Scoring by half: 58–22, 79–27

Yoyogi National Gymnasium, Tokyo

April 30

| Philippines | 64–71 | Singapore |
Scoring by half: 26–38, 38–33

Yoyogi National Gymnasium, Tokyo

== Final round ==
- The results and the points of the matches between the same teams that were already played during the preliminary round shall be taken into account for the final round.

=== Classification 7th–9th ===
| Team | Pld | W | L | PF | PA | PD | Pts |
|---|---|---|---|---|---|---|---|
| Hong Kong | 2 | 2 | 0 | 132 | 118 | +14 | 4 |
| Philippines | 2 | 1 | 1 | 122 | 128 | −6 | 3 |
| India | 2 | 0 | 2 | 106 | 114 | −8 | 2 |

May 2

| India | 54–56 | Hong Kong |
Scoring by half: 25–28, 29–28

Yoyogi National Gymnasium, Tokyo

May 3

| India | 52–58 | Philippines |
Scoring by half: 29–27, 23–31

Yoyogi National Gymnasium, Tokyo

May 4

| Hong Kong | 76–64 | Philippines |
Scoring by half: 36–34, 40–30

Yoyogi National Gymnasium, Tokyo

=== Championship ===
| Team | Pld | W | L | PF | PA | PD | Pts |
|---|---|---|---|---|---|---|---|
| South Korea | 5 | 5 | 0 | 632 | 226 | +406 | 10 |
| China | 5 | 4 | 1 | 624 | 199 | +425 | 9 |
| Japan | 5 | 3 | 2 | 560 | 231 | +329 | 8 |
| Macau | 5 | 2 | 3 | 214 | 653 | −439 | 7 |
| Singapore | 5 | 1 | 4 | 201 | 570 | −369 | 6 |
| Malaysia | 5 | 0 | 5 | 220 | 572 | −352 | 5 |

May 2

| Japan | 132–35 | Malaysia |
Scoring by half: 55–16, 77–19

Yoyogi National Gymnasium, Tokyo

May 2

| China | 147–21 | Singapore |
Scoring by half: 65–10, 82–11

Yoyogi National Gymnasium, Tokyo

May 2

| South Korea | 187–26 | Macau |
Scoring by half: 87–10, 100–16

Yoyogi National Gymnasium, Tokyo

May 3

| Japan | 174–21 | Macau |
Scoring by half: 82–12, 92–9

Yoyogi National Gymnasium, Tokyo

May 3

| South Korea | 65–64 | China |
Scoring by half: 37–38, 28–26

Yoyogi National Gymnasium, Tokyo

May 3

| Malaysia | 54–56 | Singapore |
Scoring by half: 28–23, 26–33

Yoyogi National Gymnasium, Tokyo

May 4

| Malaysia | 51–70 | Macau |
Scoring by half: 21–44, 30–26

Yoyogi National Gymnasium, Tokyo

May 4

| China | 68–56 | Japan |
Scoring by half: 32–28, 36–28

Yoyogi National Gymnasium, Tokyo

May 4

| South Korea | 152–35 | Singapore |
Scoring by half: 71–15, 81–20

Yoyogi National Gymnasium, Tokyo

May 5

| Macau | 79–68 | Singapore |
Scoring by half: 35–42, 44–26

Yoyogi National Gymnasium, Tokyo

May 5

| China | 172–39 | Malaysia |
Scoring by half: 83–21, 89–18

Yoyogi National Gymnasium, Tokyo

May 5

| South Korea | 86–60 | Japan |
Scoring by half: 47–28, 39–32

Yoyogi National Gymnasium, Tokyo

== Final standing ==
| Qualified for the 1983 FIBA World Championship for Women |

| Rank | Team | Record |
|---|---|---|
| 1st place, gold medalist(s) | South Korea | 6–0 |
| 2nd place, silver medalist(s) | China | 5–1 |
| 3rd place, bronze medalist(s) | Japan | 4–2 |
| 4 | Macau | 3–3 |
| 5 | Singapore | 2–4 |
| 6 | Malaysia | 1–5 |
| 7 | Hong Kong | 2–2 |
| 8 | Philippines | 1–3 |
| 9 | India | 0–4 |

== Awards ==
1982 Asian champions

South Korea
Seventh title
