= Malaysia women's national basketball team =

National basketball team of Malaysia

Malaysia
- FIBA ranking: 80 ▼4 (18 March 2026)
- Joined FIBA: 1957
- FIBA zone: FIBA Asia
- National federation: Malaysia Basketball Association (MABA)
- Coach: Sze Yuin Yoong

Olympic Games
- Appearances: None

World Cup
- Appearances: 2
- Medals: None

Asia Cup
- Appearances: 23
- Medals: None
Home	Away

The Malaysia women's national basketball team is a national basketball team of Malaysia. It is managed by the Malaysia Basketball Association (MABA); (Malay: Persatuan Bola Keranjang Malaysia).

In terms of qualifications to the FIBA Women's Basketball World Cup, Malaysia's ranks as one of Asia's top five basketball nations. In the Southeast Asian region, the team has traditionally been a top competitor.

== History ==
In March 2017, Malaysia's national team competed in the 2017 SBL pre-season blitz in Perth, Western Australia.

In August 2017, Malaysia defended gold after beating Thailand 65-60 in the 2017 SEA Games women's basketball match at the MABA Stadium in Kuala Lumpur. Yoong Sze Yuin's squad, which won its five previous games, started the game a little slow and trailed 12-26 in the first quarter but later managed to reduce the points gap in the second quarter to 35-39. The line-up of national players led by Nur Izzati Yaakob finished the game 65-60 in the fourth quarter. This win was the basketball squad’s 14th gold medal during the SEA Games since it was first competed in 1977. Yoong Sze Yuin had won the Singapore SEA Games two years ago, too.

== Competitions ==
=== FIBA Women's Basketball World Cup ===
World Cup Record
Year	Position	Pld	W	L
(Chile) 1953	did not qualify			
(Brazil) 1957	did not qualify			
(Soviet Union) 1959	did not qualify			
(Peru) 1964	did not qualify			
(Czechoslovakia) 1967	did not qualify			
(Brazil) 1971	did not qualify			
(Colombia) 1975	did not qualify			
(South Korea) 1979	11th	6	1	5
(Brazil) 1983	did not qualify			
(Soviet Union) 1986	did not qualify			
(Malaysia) 1990	16th	8	0	8
(Australia) 1994	did not qualify			
(Germany) 1998	did not qualify			
(China) 2002	did not qualify			
(Brazil) 2006	did not qualify			
(Czech Republic) 2010	did not qualify			
(Turkey) 2014	did not qualify			
(Spain) 2018	did not qualify			
(Australia) 2022	did not qualify			
(Germany) 2026	did not qualify			
(Japan) 2030	To be determined			
Total		14	1	13

=== FIBA Women's Asia Cup ===
Asian Cup Record
Year	Division A				Division B			
Year	Position	Pld	W	L	Position	Pld	W	L
(South Korea) 1965	5th place	8	0	8	No Division B / Level II			
(Taiwan) 1968	5th place	7	3	4	No Division B / Level II			
(Malaysia) 1970	4th place	9	6	3	No Division B / Level II			
(Taiwan) 1972	did not qualify				No Division B / Level II			
(South Korea) 1974	did not qualify				No Division B / Level II			
(Hong Kong) 1976	4th place	6	3	3	No Division B / Level II			
(Malaysia) 1978	4th place	8	5	3	No Division B / Level II			
(Hong Kong) 1980	4th place	6	3	3	No Division B / Level II			
(Japan) 1982	6th place	6	1	5	No Division B / Level II			
(China) 1984	5th place	7	3	4	No Division B / Level II			
(Malaysia) 1986	6th place	7	2	5	No Division B / Level II			
(Hong Kong) 1988	5th place	8	4	4	No Division B / Level II			
(Singapore) 1990	5th place	4	0	4	Level I			
(South Korea) 1992	did not qualify				No Division B / Level II			
(Japan) 1994	9th place	Level II			4th place	5	2	3
(Japan) 1995	10th place	Level II			4th place	5	3	2
(Thailand) 1997	8th place	Level II			2nd place	4	3	1
(Japan) 1999	7th place	Level II			2nd place	3	2	1
(Thailand) 2001	9th place	Level II			4th place	5	3	2
(Japan) 2004	6th place	Level II			1st place	3	3	0
(China) 2005	8th place	Level II			3rd place	5	4	1
(South Korea) 2007	6th place	6	0	6	Level I			
(India) 2009	7th place	Level II			1st place	6	4	2
(Japan) 2011	7th place	Level II			1st place	6	4	2
(Thailand) 2013	8th place	Level II			2nd place	6	4	2
(China) 2015	10th place	Level II			4th place	5	3	2
(India) 2017	did not qualify							
(India) 2019	did not qualify							
(Jordan) 2021	did not qualify							
(Australia) 2023	did not qualify							
(China) 2025	did not qualify							
(Philippines) 2027	To be determined							
Total		82	30	52		53	35	18

=== SEABA Championship for Women ===
Southeast Asian Championship Record
Year	Position	Pld	W	L
(Thailand) 1995	3rd place			
(Thailand) 1997	3rd place			
(Malaysia) 1999	1st place			
(Thailand) 2002	2nd place			
(Singapore) 2004	3rd place			
(Thailand) 2007	3rd place	6	3	3
(Philippines) 2010	3rd place	5	3	2
(Indonesia) 2014	1st place	3	2	1
(Malaysia) 2016	2nd place	6	5	1
Total	2 gold, 2 silver, 5 bronze	13–7 (incomplete)		

=== Olympic Games ===
yet to qualify

=== Asian Games ===
Asian Games Record
Year	Position	Pld	W	L
(Iran) 1974	did not participate			
(Thailand) 1978	5th place	4	0	4
(India) 1982	did not participate			
(South Korea) 1986	4th place	3	0	3
(China) 1990	did not participate			
(Japan) 1994	did not participate			
(Thailand) 1998	did not participate			
(South Korea) 2002	6th place	5	0	5
(Qatar) 2006	did not participate			
(China) 2010	did not participate			
(South Korea) 2014	did not participate			
(Indonesia) 2018	did not participate			
(China) 2022	did not participate			
(Japan) 2026	be determined			
Total		12	0	12

=== Southeast Asian Games ===
Southeast Asian Games Record
Year	Position	Pld	W	L
(Malaysia) 1977	1st place	3	3	0
(Indonesia) 1979	1st place	3	3	0
(Philippines) 1981	1st place	5	5	0
(Singapore) 1983	1st place	4	4	0
(Thailand) 1985	1st place	3	3	0
(Indonesia) 1987	2nd place	5	3	2
(Malaysia) 1989	2nd place	4	3	1
(Philippines) 1991	3rd place	6	3	3
(Singapore) 1993	2nd place	5	3	2
(Thailand) 1995	3rd place	6	4	2
(Indonesia) 1997	1st place	5	5	0
(Brunei) 1999	Not Held			
(Malaysia) 2001	1st place	4	4	0
(Vietnam) 2003	1st place	5	4	1
(Philippines) 2005	Not held			
(Thailand) 2007	1st place	3	3	0
(Laos) 2009	Not held			
(Indonesia) 2011	3rd place	4	2	2
(Myanmar) 2013	3rd place	4	2	2
(Singapore) 2015	1st place	5	4	1
(Malaysia) 2017	1st place	6	6	0
(Philippines) 2019	4th place	3	0	3
(Vietnam) 2021	3rd place	5	3	2
(Cambodia) 2023	3rd place	6	4	2
(Thailand) 2025	4th place	5	2	3
Total	11 gold, 3 silver, 6 bronze	73–26 (since 1977)		

=== Other Tournaments ===
Other Tournaments
Year	Position	Pld	W	L
(Taiwan) 2009 William Jones Cup	4th place	5	0	5

== Team ==
=== Current roster ===
Malaysia roster at the 2019 Southeast Asian Games

Malaysia National Basketball Team roster
Players
Coaches

Pos.	No.	Name	Age – Date of birth	Height	Club
F	3	Mun Yi Chia	21 – 8 March 1998	1.70 m (5 ft 7 in)	NS Matrix	(Malaysia)
G	4	Pei Jie Tan	21 – 5 May 1998	1.67 m (5 ft 6 in)	Segamat BA	(Malaysia)
F	5	Phei Ling Lee	22 – 20 December 1996	1.74 m (5 ft 9 in)	NS Matrix	(Malaysia)
G	6	Wei Yin Saw	27 – 2 March 1992	1.68 m (5 ft 6 in)	NS Matrix	(Malaysia)
G	9	Phey Chyl Low	25 – 29 March 1994	1.70 m (5 ft 7 in)	NS Matrix	(Malaysia)
F	10	Chia Qian Tai	23 – 15 June 1996	1.71 m (5 ft 7 in)	Red Barron BA	(Malaysia)
C	12	Kalaimathi Rajintiran	23 – 2 September 1996	1.85 m (6 ft 1 in)	Segamat BA	(Malaysia)
C	22	Ky Lie Hiew	21 – 22 March 1998	1.78 m (5 ft 10 in)	Red Barron BA	(Malaysia)
G	26	Kar Syuen Khoo	21 – 10 August 1998	1.63 m (5 ft 4 in)	Red Barron BA	(Malaysia)
G	28	Ching Yee Ho	21 – 22 June 1998	1.60 m (5 ft 3 in)	Red Barron BA	(Malaysia)
F	35	Fook Yee Yap	26 – 15 June 1993	1.72 m (5 ft 8 in)	NS Matrix	(Malaysia)
C	72	Chiau Teng Eugene Ting	27 – 10 March 1992	1.80 m (5 ft 11 in)	NS Matrix	(Malaysia)

Head coach

- (Malaysia) Sze Yuin Yoong

Assistant coach(es)

- (Malaysia) Seck Yun Choo

Legend

- (C) Team captain
- Club – describes last
  club before the tournament
- Age – describes age
  on 10 December 2019

== Head coaches ==
- (Malaysia) Tan Ee Shya (2025)
- (Japan) Tomohiro Moriyama (2026–)

== See also ==
- Malaysia women's national under-19 basketball team
- Malaysia women's national under-17 basketball team
- Malaysia men's national basketball team
- Malaysia national under-19 basketball team
- Malaysia national under-17 basketball team
- Malaysia Pro League
