= 2016 SEABA Championship for Women =

9th Southeast Asian Women's Basketball Championship

Tournament details
- Host country: Malaysia
- Dates: 20–26 September
- Teams: 7 (from 10 federations)
- Venue: (in 1 host city)

Final positions
- Champions: Philippines (2nd title)

Tournament statistics
- MVP: Afril Bernardino

The 2016 SEABA Championship for Women was the 9th edition of the SEABA Championship for Women. It was held in Malacca City, Malaysia from 20 to 26 September.

The Malaysia Basketball Association announced Malaysia's hosting of the tournament in May 2016.

The Philippines secured their second title after they won over host Malaysia with the scoreline of 77–73 in September 24 with games still to be played. By that time, only Malaysia could tie them by points but the winner over the other rule ensures the Philippines' title.

== Round robin ==
Team	Pld	W	L	PF	PA	PD	Pts
Philippines	6	6	0	603	312	+291	12
Malaysia	6	5	1	515	284	+231	11
Singapore	6	4	2	460	334	+126	10
Indonesia	6	3	3	388	338	+50	9
Thailand	6	2	4	378	362	+16	8
Vietnam	6	1	5	324	526	−202	7
Laos	6	0	6	166	717	−551	6

20 September
15:00

Boxscore

Philippines	69–43	Singapore
Scoring by quarter: 18–18, 28–9, 12–9, 11–7
Pts: Cabinbin 16; Rebs: Resultay 8 Asts: five players 2 each		Pts: Lim J.M. 14; Rebs: Chu 5 Asts: Yoshida 2

Bukit Serindit Indoor Stadium
Referees: Kim Bo-hui (KOR), Rendra Lesmana (INA), Ng Pei Yin (MAS)

20 September
17:00

Boxscore

Thailand	51–64	Indonesia
Scoring by quarter: 22–15, 7–15, 10–20, 12–14
Pts: Kruatiwa 14; Rebs: three players 7 each Asts: Chalermwat, Saechua 2		Pts: Sophia 17; Rebs: Sophia 13; Asts: Ayuningrum, Soemaryono 4

Bukit Serindit Indoor Stadium
Referees: Naing Phyo Win (MYA), Lim Sook Hoon (MAS), Reynante Hufana (PHI)

20 September
20:00

Boxscore

Malaysia	113–55	Vietnam
Scoring by quarter: 43–11, 20–17, 20–19, 30–8
Pts: Chong Y.Y. 22; Rebs: Low 9 Asts: Low 5		Pts: Bùi Kim Nhân 19; Rebs: Bùi Kim Nhân 10; Asts: Bùi Thị Huyền Trang 3

Bukit Serindit Indoor Stadium
Referees: Lim Muang (MYA), Watcharin Padungratchadakit (THA), Tan Yee Nee (SIN)

21 September
16:00

Boxscore

Laos	32–179	Philippines
Scoring by quarter: 15–50, 3–46, 8–37, 6–46
Pts: Phanthalangsy 15; Rebs: Nanthalath 4 Asts: three players 2 each		Pts: Animam 28; Rebs: Animam 17; Asts: Abaca 7

Bukit Serindit Indoor Stadium
Referees: Naing Phyo Win (MYA), Chan Wai Seong (MAS), Tan Yee Nee (SIN)

21 September
18:00

Boxscore

Singapore	76–67	Thailand
Scoring by quarter: 25–5, 16–21, 20–14, 15–27
Pts: Lim J.M. 33; Rebs: Lim J.M. 7 Asts: Yoshida 7		Pts: Kruatiwa 15; Rebs: Kaichaiyapoom 6 Asts: Chalermwat 5

Bukit Serindit Indoor Stadium
Referees: Chan Owe Shiong (MAS), Reynante Hufana (PHI), Rendra Lesmana (INA)

21 September
20:00

Boxscore

Indonesia	31–74	Malaysia
Scoring by quarter: 7–24, 9–11, 11–17, 4–22
Pts: Kalumata, Sumiati 9 Rebs: Sophia 8 Asts: Dewi 2		Pts: Yap F.Y. 13; Rebs: Yaakob 9 Asts: Yaakob 4

Bukit Serindit Indoor Stadium
Referees: Kim Bo-hui (KOR), Linn Maung (MYA), Watcharin Padungratchadakit (THA)

22 September
16:00

Boxscore

Laos	34–98	Indonesia
Scoring by quarter: 4–25, 9–26, 11–30, 10–17
Pts: Phanthalangsy 20; Rebs: Nanthalath 11; Asts: Oupalavong 2		Pts: Sumiati 18; Rebs: four players 6 each Asts: Putri 5

Bukit Serindit Indoor Stadium
Referees: Watcharin Padungratchadakit (THA), Tan Yee Nee (SIN), Ng Pei Yin (MAS)

22 September
18:00

Boxscore

Philippines	134–56	Vietnam
Scoring by quarter: 26–8, 41–14, 28–19, 39–15
Pts: Sambile 20; Rebs: Lim 10; Asts: Cabinbin 8		Pts: Linh Huỳnh Bảo Anh 12; Rebs: Bùi Thị Huyền Trang 5 Asts: Bùi Thị Huyền Trang 3

Bukit Serindit Indoor Stadium
Referees: Lim Sook Hoon (MAS), Naing Phyo Win (MYA), Rendra Lesmana (INA)

22 September
20:00

Boxscore

Malaysia	76–47	Singapore
Scoring by quarter: 27–13, 13–3, 18–17, 18–14
Pts: Pang H.P. 15; Rebs: Pang H.P. 9 Asts: Pang H.P. 5		Pts: Chu 13; Rebs: Koh W.B. 7 Asts: Yoshida 4

Bukit Serindit Indoor Stadium
Referees: Kim Bo-hui (KOR), Linn Maung (MYA), Reynante Hufana (PHI)

23 September
16:00

Boxscore

Vietnam	47–77	Thailand
Scoring by quarter: 9–24, 13–18, 10–18, 15–17
Pts: Linh Huỳnh Bảo Anh 17; Rebs: Bùi Kim Nhân 6 Asts: Trần Thị Yến Vân 3		Pts: Thiratananiti Worachot 14; Rebs: Kruatiwa 6 Asts: 3 players 3 each

Bukit Serindit Indoor Stadium
Referees: Linn Maung (MYA), Rendra Lesmana (INA), Chan Wai Seong (MAS)

23 September
18:00

Boxscore

Singapore	131–22	Laos
Scoring by quarter: 31–4, 34–6, 34–6, 32–6
Pts: Lee 19; Rebs: Al. Lim 12; Asts: Yoshida 5		Pts: Nanthalath 8 Rebs: Nanthalath, Phanthalangsy 6 Asts: Nanthalath 2

Bukit Serindit Indoor Stadium
Referees: Reynante Hufana (PHI), Ng Pei Yin (MAS), Watcharin Padungratchadakit (THA)

23 September
20:00

Boxscore

Indonesia	56–72	Philippines
Scoring by quarter: 15–26, 13–15, 21–16, 7–15
Pts: two players 13 each Rebs: Putri 9 Asts: seven players 1 each		Pts: Lim 24; Rebs: Bernardino 15; Asts: Cabinbin 7

Bukit Serindit Indoor Stadium
Referees: Kim Bo-hui (KOR), Naing Phyo Win (MYA), Chan Owe Shiong (MAS)

24 September
16:00

Boxscore

Thailand	89–46	Laos
Scoring by quarter: 24–14, 27–9, 23–10, 15–13
Pts: Thiratananiti Worachot 14; Rebs: Prajuapsook 11; Asts: Saechua 6		Pts: Phanthalangsy 10; Rebs: Nanthalath 9 Asts: Nanthalath 4

Bukit Serindit Indoor Stadium
Referees: Rendra Lesmana (INA), Ng Pei Yin (MAS), Tan Yee Nee (SIN)

24 September
18:00

Boxscore

Singapore	92–32	Vietnam
Scoring by quarter: 26–6, 20–6, 32–3, 14–17
Pts: Am. Lim 22; Rebs: Al. Lim 9 Asts: Yoshida 4		Pts: Bùi Kim Nhân 11; Rebs: Bùi Kim Nhân 4 Asts: Bùi Thị Huyền Trang 2

Bukit Serindit Indoor Stadium
Referees: Lim Sook Hoon (MAS), Watcharin Padungratchadakit (THA), Reynante Hufana (PHI)

24 September
20:00

Boxscore

Malaysia	73–77	Philippines
Scoring by quarter: 17–20, 17–23, 15–21, 24-13
Pts: Yap F.Y. 23; Rebs: Pang H.P. 7 Asts: Saw W.Y. 3		Pts: Lim 16; Rebs: Almazan 12; Asts: Bernardino 5

Bukit Serindit Indoor Stadium
Referees: Kim Bo-hui (KOR), Linn Maung (MYA), Naing Phyo Win (MYA)

25 September
16:00

Boxscore

Vietnam	36–71	Indonesia
Scoring by quarter: 10-20, 8-15, 10-21, 8-15
Pts: Pham 11; Rebs: Trần Thị Yến Vân 7 Asts: Pham 2		Pts: Sophia 19; Rebs: Sophia 15; Asts: Humardani 3

Bukit Serindit Indoor Stadium

25 September
18:00

Boxscore

Philippines	72–52	Thailand
Scoring by quarter: 13-16, 19-9, 18-15, 22-12
Pts: Lim 15; Rebs: Bernardino 11; Asts: Cabinbin 4		Pts: Kruatiwa 12; Rebs: Chamnarwaree 8 Asts: Saechua 3

Bukit Serindit Indoor Stadium
Referees: Kim Bo-hui (KOR), Chan Owe Shiong (MAS), Naing Phyo Win (MYA)

25 September
20:00

Boxscore

Laos	32–122	Malaysia
Scoring by quarter: 9-24, 9-35, 8-29, 6-34
Pts: Phanthalangsy 13; Rebs: Nanthalath 6		Pts: two players 22 each Asts: Chong 7

Bukit Serindit Indoor Stadium
Referees: Yee Nee Tan (SIN), Rendra Lesmana (INA), Watcharin Padungratchadakit (THA)

26 September
16:00

Boxscore

Vietnam	98–39	Laos
Scoring by quarter: 17-4, 18-11, 28-13, 35-11
Pts: Linh Huỳnh Bảo Anh 33; Rebs: Trần Thị Yến Vân 13; Asts: four players each 4		Pts: Phanthalangsy; Rebs: Nanthalath; Asts: two players each 2

Bukit Serindit Indoor Stadium
Referees: Pei Yin Ng (MAS), Tan Yee Nee (SIN), Rendra Lesmana (INA)

26 September
18:00

Boxscore

Indonesia	68–71	Singapore
Scoring by quarter: 14-9, 10-17, 23-23, 21-22
Pts: Sophia 23; Rebs: Sophia 11; Asts: Putri 6		Pts: Lim 23; Rebs: Lim 9 Asts: Lim 4

Bukit Serindit Indoor Stadium
Referees: Naing Phyo Win (MYA), Watcharin Padungratchadakit (THA), Lim Sook Hoon (MAS)

26 September
20:00

Boxscore

Malaysia	57–42	Thailand
Scoring by quarter: 15-13, 12-9, 15-12, 15-8
Pts: Yap F.Y. 14; Rebs: Pang H.P. 9 Asts: Yaakob 4		Pts: Kruatiwa 18; Rebs: Kruatiwa 11; Asts: Chamnarwaree 4

Bukit Serindit Indoor Stadium

== Final standings ==
Rank	Team
Gold medal	Philippines
Silver medal	Malaysia
Bronze medal	Singapore
4	Indonesia
5	Thailand
6	Vietnam
7	Laos

== Awards ==
2016 SEABA champions

Philippines
Second title

Most Valuable Player

- (Philippines) Afril Bernardino

Team of the Tournament

- (Indonesia) Gabriel Sophia
- (Malaysia) Yap Fook Yee
- (Philippines) Afril Bernardino
- (Philippines) Allana Lim
- (Singapore) Lim Jia Min
