= 1984 ABC Championship for Women =

1984 FIBA Women's Asia Cup
10th Asian Women's Basketball Championship

Tournament details
- Host country: China
- Dates: October 13–24
- Teams: 10 (from all Asian federations)
- Venue: 1 (in 1 host city)

Final positions
- Champions: South Korea (8th title)

The 1984 Asian Basketball Confederation Championship for Women were held in Shanghai, China.

== Preliminary round ==
=== Group A ===
Team	Pld	W	L	PF	PA	PD	Pts
South Korea	4	4	0	531	147	+384	8
Philippines	4	3	1	252	263	−11	7
Singapore	4	2	2	168	268	−100	6
India	4	1	3	235	350	−115	5
Macau	4	0	4	178	336	−158	4

October 13

Macau	47–49	Singapore
Scoring by half: 28–25, 19–24

Shanghai

South Korea	105–35	Philippines
Scoring by half: 48–17, 57–18

Shanghai

October 14

Singapore	49–44	India
Scoring by half: 31–18, 18–26

Shanghai

South Korea	151–35	Macau
Scoring by half: 74–14, 77–21

Shanghai

India	76–88	Philippines
Scoring by half: 39–47, 37–41

Shanghai

Singapore	30–116	South Korea
Scoring by half: 8–65, 22–51

Shanghai

India	47–159	South Korea
Scoring by half: 13–86, 34–73

Shanghai

Philippines	68–42	Macau
Scoring by half: 31–25, 37–17

Shanghai

Macau	54–68	India
Scoring by half: 23–41, 31–27

Shanghai

October 18

Philippines	61–40	Singapore
Scoring by half: 28–17, 33–23

Shanghai

=== Group B ===
Team	Pld	W	L	PF	PA	PD	Pts
China	4	4	0	487	158	+329	8
Japan	4	3	1	295	206	+89	7
Malaysia	4	2	2	260	234	+26	6
Hong Kong	4	1	3	222	347	−125	5
Sri Lanka	4	0	4	151	470	−319	4

China	171–40	Sri Lanka
Scoring by half: 81–16, 90–24

Shanghai

Malaysia	76–58	Hong Kong
Scoring by half: 38–35, 38–23

Shanghai

China	90–40	Japan
Scoring by half: 48–20, 42–20

Shanghai

Sri Lanka	31–106	Malaysia
Scoring by half: 21–51, 10–55

Shanghai

Hong Kong	43–135	China
Scoring by half: 23–73, 20–62

Shanghai

Japan	116–29	Sri Lanka
Scoring by half: 46–25, 70–4

Shanghai

Sri Lanka	51–77	Hong Kong
Scoring by half: 28–27, 23–50

Shanghai

Japan	54–43	Malaysia
Scoring by half: 38–27, 16–16

Shanghai

October 18

Hong Kong	44–85	Japan
Scoring by half: 20–43, 24–42

Shanghai

October 18

Malaysia	35–91	China
Scoring by half: 17–41, 18–50

Shanghai

== Second round ==
- The results and the points of the matches between the same teams that were already played during the preliminary round shall be taken into account for the second round.

=== Classification 7th–10th ===
Team	Pld	W	L	PF	PA	PD	Pts	Tiebreaker
India	3	2	1	209	162	+47	5	1–1 / 1.118
Macau	3	2	1	227	206	+21	5	1–1 / 1.023
Hong Kong	3	2	1	187	176	+11	5	1–1 / 0.880
Sri Lanka	3	0	3	187	266	−79	3	

Hong Kong	48–46	India
Scoring by half: 26–24, 22–22

Shanghai

Sri Lanka	76–94	Macau
Scoring by half: 38–47, 38–47

Shanghai

India	95–60	Sri Lanka
Scoring by half: 44–23, 51–37

Shanghai

October 23

Macau	79–62	Hong Kong
Scoring by half: 43–30, 36–32

Shanghai

=== Championship ===
Team	Pld	W	L	PF	PA	PD	Pts
China	5	5	0	479	192	+287	10
South Korea	5	4	1	477	223	+254	9
Japan	5	3	2	276	293	−17	8
Philippines	5	2	3	195	344	−149	7
Malaysia	5	1	4	217	323	−106	6
Singapore	5	0	5	170	439	−269	5

China	115–36	Singapore
Scoring by half: 65–16, 50–20

Shanghai

Malaysia	32–106	South Korea
Scoring by half: 18–53, 14–53

Shanghai

Japan	60–43	Philippines
Scoring by half: 37–24, 23–19

Shanghai

South Korea	91–50	Japan
Scoring by half: 48–20, 43–30

Shanghai

Philippines	22–107	China
Scoring by half: 16–25, 6–82

Shanghai

Singapore	38–75	Malaysia
Scoring by half: 12–27, 26–48

Shanghai

October 23

Philippines	34–32	Malaysia
Scoring by half: 15–12, 19–20

Shanghai

October 23

Japan	72–26	Singapore
Scoring by half: 41–12, 31–14

Shanghai

October 23

China	76–59	South Korea
Scoring by half: 45–30, 31–29

Shanghai

== Final round ==
=== 3rd place ===
October 24

Japan	81–53	Philippines
Scoring by half: 38–23, 43–30

Shanghai

=== Final ===
October 24

China	61–62	South Korea
Scoring by half: 34–29, 27–33

Shanghai

== Final standing ==
Rank	Team	Record
1st place, gold medalist(s)	South Korea	7–1
2nd place, silver medalist(s)	China	7–1
3rd place, bronze medalist(s)	Japan	6–2
4	Philippines	4–4
5	Malaysia	3–4
6	Singapore	2–5
7	India	2–4
8	Macau	2–4
9	Hong Kong	2–4
10	Sri Lanka	0–6

== Awards ==
1984 Asian champions

South Korea
Eighth title
