= 1968 ABC Championship for Women =

1968 FIBA Women's Asia Cup
2nd Asian Women's Basketball Championship

Tournament details
- Host country: Republic of China
- Dates: July 22–31
- Teams: 8 (from all Asian confederations)
- Venue: 1 (in 1 host city)

Final positions
- Champions: South Korea (2nd title)

The 1968 Asian Basketball Confederation Championship for Women were held in Taipei, Republic of China.

== Results ==
Team	Pld	W	L	PF	PA	PD	Pts
South Korea	7	7	0	646	247	+399	14
Japan	7	6	1	613	296	+317	13
Formosa	7	5	2	463	383	+80	12
Thailand	7	4	3	438	451	−13	11
Malaysia	7	3	4	357	516	−159	10
Philippines	7	2	5	306	430	−124	9
Hong Kong	7	1	6	323	498	−175	8
Singapore	7	0	7	246	571	−325	7

Singapore	41–63	Philippines
Scoring by half: 16–29, 25–34

Taipei

Formosa	76–49	Hong Kong
Scoring by half: 33–25, 43–24

Taipei

Formosa	68–31	Singapore
Scoring by half: 33–11, 35–20

Taipei

South Korea	95–21	Hong Kong
Scoring by half: 42–6, 53–15

Taipei

Philippines	58–66	Malaysia
Scoring by half: 20–32, 38–34

Taipei

Thailand	41–80	Japan
Scoring by half: 16–34, 25–46

Taipei

Malaysia	44–72	Formosa
Scoring by half: 25–30, 19–42

Taipei

Singapore	41–72	Thailand
Scoring by half: 17–33, 24–39

Taipei

Japan	80–33	Hong Kong
Scoring by half: 43–15, 37–18

Taipei

Philippines	28–82	South Korea
Scoring by half: 8–38, 20–44

Taipei

Singapore	14–117	South Korea
Scoring by half: 10–61, 4–56

Taipei

Malaysia	30–118	Japan
Scoring by half: 16–65, 14–53

Taipei

Hong Kong	43–46	Philippines
Scoring by half: 18–25, 25–21

Taipei

Formosa	83–65	Thailand
Scoring by half: 41–30, 42–35

Taipei

South Korea	93–25	Malaysia
Scoring by half: 47–10, 46–15

Taipei

Philippines	36–59	Thailand
Scoring by half: 16–33, 20–26

Taipei

Hong Kong	62–47	Singapore
Scoring by half: 22–20, 40–27

Taipei

Japan	70–57	Formosa
Scoring by half: 38–30, 32–27

Taipei

Japan	87–37	Philippines
Scoring by half: 43–13, 44–24

Taipei

Thailand	88–55	Hong Kong
Scoring by half: 36–26, 52–29

Taipei

Malaysia	71–46	Singapore
Scoring by half: 30–18, 41–28

Taipei

South Korea	86–55	Formosa
Scoring by half: 39–22, 47–33

Taipei

Hong Kong	60–66	Malaysia
Scoring by half: 21–36, 39–30

Taipei

Formosa	52–38	Philippines
Scoring by half: 34–19, 18–19

Taipei

Singapore	26–118	Japan
Scoring by half: 14–60, 12–58

Taipei

Thailand	44–101	South Korea
Scoring by half: 24–52, 20–49

Taipei

Thailand	69–55	Malaysia
Scoring by half: 32–30, 37–25

Taipei

South Korea	72–60	Japan
Scoring by half: 31–24, 41–36

Taipei

== Final standing ==
Rank	Team	Record
1st place, gold medalist(s)	South Korea	7–0
2nd place, silver medalist(s)	Japan	6–1
3rd place, bronze medalist(s)	Formosa	5–2
4	Thailand	4–3
5	Malaysia	3–4
6	Philippines	2–5
7	Hong Kong	1–6
8	Singapore	0–7

== Awards ==
1968 Asian champions

South Korea
Second title

- Most Valuable Player: (Malaysia) Annie Goh Koon Gee

== See also ==
- List of sporting events in Taiwan
