= BT Toews =

Canadian basketball coach

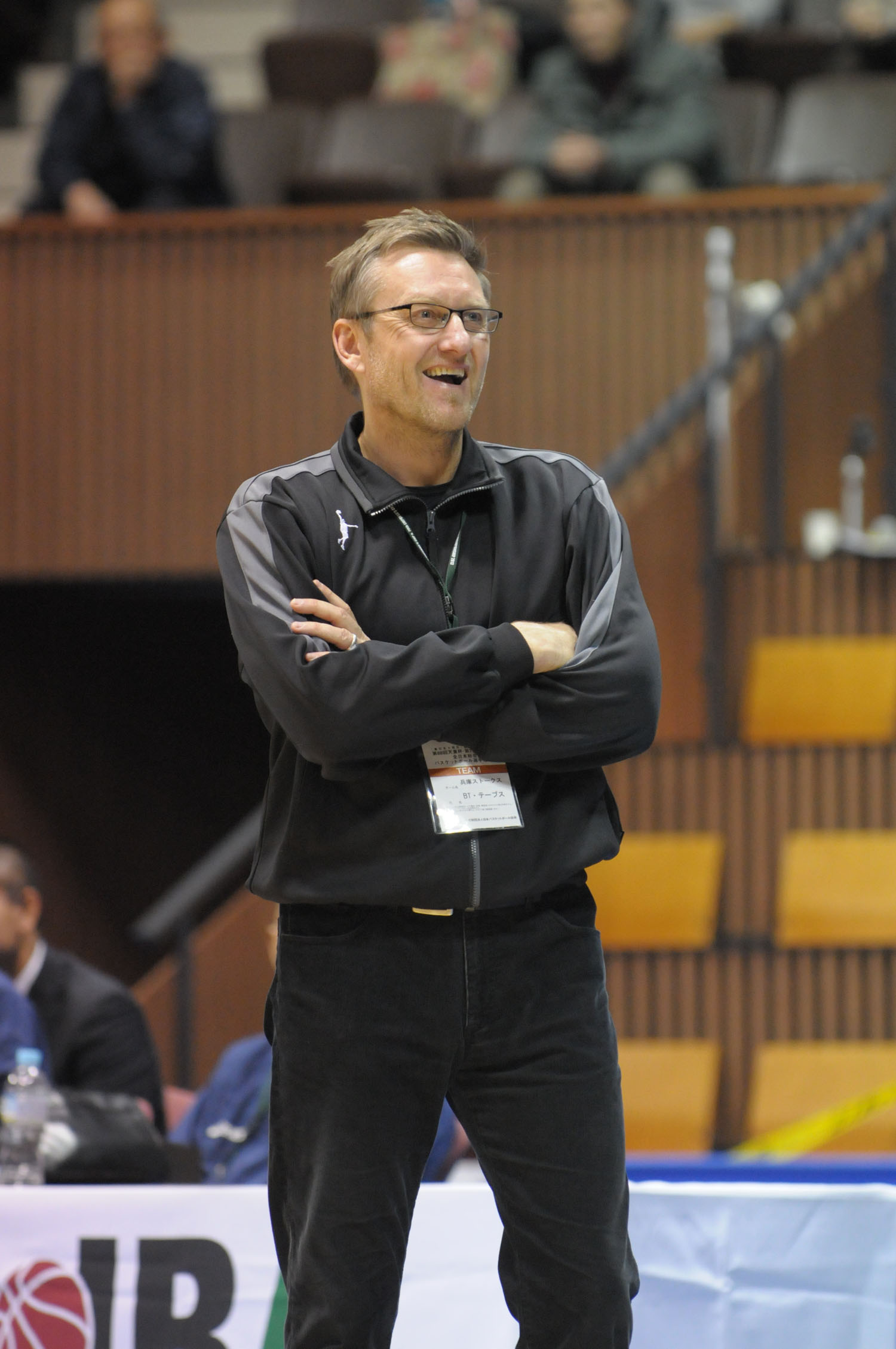
- Toews with Hyogo Storks in 2013

Philippines women's national basketball team
- Position: Head coach

Personal information
- Born: February 8, 1966 (age 60) Canada

Career information
- College: Winnipeg

Career history

Playing
- 1990–1992: Kuroda Electric Bullet Spirits
- –: Winnipeg Thunder
- 1995-1996: BG Steiner Bayreuth

Coaching
- 1996–1997: University of Winnipeg (assistant)
- 2005–2012: Canadian Academy HS
- 2011–2013: Hyogo Storks
- 2013–2014: Fujitsu Red Wave (associate)
- 2014–2016: Fujitsu Red Wave
- 2016–2017: Hitachi SunRockers Tokyo-Shibuya
- 2017–2018: Toyama Grouses (assistant)
- 2018–2025: Fujitsu Red Wave
- 2026–present: Philippines (women)

Burke "BT" Toews (born February 8, 1966) is a Canadian basketball coach and former player. He is the head coach of the Philippines women's national basketball team since May 2026. Toews played professionally in Canada and Germany.

== Career ==
=== Playing career ===
Toews played for the Wesmen of the University of Winnipeg in college often as a point guard. By the time he had graduated from college, he transitioned to the shooting guard position. He then joined the Athletes in Action (AIA)

After playing for AIA, Toews went to Japan to play for Kuroda Electric. Then he went to play for the Winnipeg Thunder of the World Basketball League in North America. His last team was the German team, BG Steiner Bayreuth before transitioning to coaching.

=== Coaching career ===
==== Early years ====
Toews returned to Canada to study to acquire a coaching license. From 2005 to 2012, Toews worked as a school teacher and coach at the Canadian Academy in Kobe, Japan.

==== Hyogo Storks ====
Toews' first head coach role was from 2011 to 2013, with the Hyogo Storks. The Storks finished third at the JBL2 in his first season while winning the next season helping the team earn a berth in the first division.

==== First Fujitsu Red Wave stint ====
Toews initially joined the Fujitsu Red Wave in 2013 as an assistant coach of the women's team. In 2014, he was promoted to become their head coach.

==== Hitachi SunRockers Tokyo Shibuya ====
The Hitachi SunRockers Tokyo Shibuya of the B.League had Toews as their head coach from 2016 to 2017.

==== Toyama Grouses ====
Toews became an assistant coach for the Toyama Grouses from 2017 to 2018.

==== Second Fujitsu Red Wave stint ====
Toews returned to the Fujitsu Red Wave in 2018. The team which plays in the Women's Japan Basketball League finished as runners-up for the 2021–22 season. They won the 2023–24 and 2024–25 seasons league titles and the Empress Cup. Toews left Fujitsu in May 2025 after the expiry of his contract.

==== Philippines ====
The Samahang Basketbol ng Pilipinas, the national association of the Phippines, announced on May 20, 2026 the appointment of Toews as the head coach of the Philippine women's national team. His first tournament with the Philippines is the 2028 FIBA Women's Pre-Qualifying Qualifying Tournament in August 2026.

== Personal life ==
BT Toews is married to a Japanese woman. They had a son, Kai Toews who also grew up to be a basketball player. The elder Toews' nickname "BT" is an abbreviation of his full name "Burke Toews".

== Head coaching record ==
Legend
Regular season	G	Games coached	W	Games won	L	Games lost	W–L %	Win–loss %
Playoffs	PG	Playoff games	PW	Playoff wins	PL	Playoff losses	PW–L %	Playoff win–loss %

Team	Year	G	W	L	W–L%	Finish	PG	PW	PL	PW–L%	Result
Hyogo Storks	2011-12	27	17	10	.630	4th	2	1	1	.500	3rd
Hyogo Storks	2012-13	32	27	5	.844	1st in Western	2	2	0	1.000	JBL2 Champions
Fujitsu Red Wave	2014-15	30	24	6	.800	3rd	5	2	3	.400	Runners-up
Fujitsu Red Wave	2015-16	24	18	6	.750	2nd	10	5	5	.500	Runners-up
Hitachi SunRockers Tokyo-Shibuya	2016-17	60	32	28	.533	3rd in Central	2	0	2	.000	Lost in 1st round
