= 2026 FIBA Women's Olympic Pre-Qualifying Tournament =

Tournament details
- Host country: Mexico
- City: Guadalajara
- Dates: 17–23 August
- Teams: 8 (from 3 confederations)
- Venue: 1 (in 1 host city)

Final positions
- Champions: Canada
- Runners-up: Mexico

Tournament statistics
- Games played: 15
- Attendance: 13,537 (902 per game)
- MVP: (Canada) Syla Swords
- Top scorer: (Senegal) Cierra Dillard (23.7 ppg)

Official website
- www.fiba.basketball

The 2026 FIBA Women's Olympic Pre-Qualifying Tournament was held in Guadalajara, Mexico, from 17 to 23 August 2026. The winners qualified for the 2028 FIBA Women's Olympic Qualifying Tournaments.

Canada won the tournament after defeating Mexico 83–53 in the final in Guadalajara.

== Participating teams ==
All eight teams that did not qualify for the 2026 FIBA Women's Basketball World Cup through the qualifying tournaments had the right to participate in this event. One of these teams, Colombia, were unable to participate, and were replaced by Mexico. On 16 June 2026, Mexico was designated as the host.

- Argentina
- Brazil
- Canada
- Mexico (hosts)
- New Zealand
- Philippines
- Senegal
- South Sudan

== Venue ==
All games were played at the Arena Astros, in Guadalajara, Mexico. The venue was used for volleyball competitions at the 2011 Pan American Games and now hosts Astros de Jalisco.

2026 FIBA Women's Olympic Pre-Qualifying Tournament is located in Mexico	Guadalajara
2026 FIBA Women's Olympic Pre-Qualifying Tournament is located in Mexico	Arena Astros
2026 FIBA Women's Olympic Pre-Qualifying Tournament is located in Mexico	Capacity: 4,000

== Draw ==
- 2026 FIBA Women's Olympic Pre-Qualifying Tournament – Draw
- Draw Live Stream

The draw was held on 19 June 2026, at the Patrick Baumann House of Basketball in Mies, Switzerland. The draw was hosted by FIBA Women's Competition Manager, Anna Barthold, with Swiss women's national team player, Evi Bartel. The draw started with, in order, pots 1, 2, 3 and 4 being drawn, with each team selected then allocated into the first available group alphabetically. The position for the team within the group would then be drawn (for the purpose of the schedule).

=== Seeding ===
The seeding was announced on 18 June 2026.

In order to preserve geographic balance, the following restrictions applied in the draw:

- A maximum of two teams from Americas drawn in each group.
- A maximum of one team from Africa and Asia-Oceania drawn in each group.

Pot 1
Team	Pos
Canada	7
Brazil	9

Pot 2
Team	Pos
New Zealand	21
Senegal	22

Pot 3
Team	Pos
Argentina	23
Philippines	30

Pot 4
Team	Pos
Mexico	31
South Sudan	42

=== Draw results ===
Group A
Pos	Team
A1	Brazil
A2	Argentina
A3	New Zealand
A4	South Sudan

Group B
Pos	Team
B1	Canada
B2	Mexico (H)
B3	Philippines
B4	Senegal

== Squads ==
Each nation has to submit a list of 12 players.

== Referees ==
The following 14 referees were selected for the tournament.

- (Bulgaria) Ventsislav Velikov
- (Colombia) Juan Cantillo
- (Croatia) Martin Vulić
- (France) Laure Coanus
- (Greece) Ioannis Agrafiotis
- (Iraq) Ahmed Al-Shuwaili
- (Montenegro) Nataša Dragojević
- (Japan) Kumiko Kumagai
- (Latvia) Ritvars Helmšteins
- (Paraguay) Nicolás Flores
- (Poland) Ewa Matuszweska
- (Puerto Rico) Edwin Quiles
- (Puerto Rico) Julirys Guzmán
- (Rwanda) Jean Ruhamiriza

== Preliminary round ==
All times are local (UTC−6).

=== Format ===
The teams were drawn into two groups of four. The top two advanced directly to the semifinals.

=== Classification of teams ===
1. Highest number of points earned, with each game result having a corresponding point:
  - Win: 2 points
  - Loss: 1 point
  - Loss by default: 1 point, with a final score of 2–0 for the opponents of the defaulting team if the latter team is not trailing or if the score is tied, or the score at the time of stoppage if they are trailing.
  - Loss by forfeit: 0 points, with a final score of 20–0 for the opponents of the forfeiting team.
2. Head-to-head record via points system above
3. Point difference in games among tied teams
4. Points for in games among tied teams
5. Point difference in all group games
6. Points for in all group games

=== Group A ===
Pos	Team	Pld	W	L	PF	PA	PD	Pts	Qualification
1	Brazil	3	2	1	175	169	+6	5 (Note: Brazil 56−53 New Zealand)	Semifinals
2	New Zealand	3	2	1	192	165	+27	5	Semifinals
3	Argentina	3	1	2	152	176	−24	4 (Note: Argentina 64−61 South Sudan)	
4	South Sudan	3	1	2	198	207	−9	4	

Source: FIBA
Rules for classification: 1) points; 2) head-to-head points; 3) head-to-head points difference; 4) head-to-head number of points scored.
Notes:

17 August 2026
12:00

Report

Brazil	61–63 (OT)	South Sudan
Scoring by quarter: 12–24, 9–5, 19–13, 16–14, Overtime: 5–7
Pts: Guyton 20; Rebs: Rodrigues 10; Asts: Nascimento 4		Pts: Bulgak 25; Rebs: Bulgak 22; Asts: Joiner, Leime 2

Arena Astros, Guadalajara
Attendance: 169
Referees: Ventsislav Velikov (BUL), Edwin Quiles (PUR), Ewa Matuszweska (POL)

17 August 2026
14:45

Report

Argentina	35–57	New Zealand
Scoring by quarter: 12–14, 12–14, 8–8, 3–21
Pts: Chagas 10; Rebs: Lagowski 6 Asts: Gretter 7		Pts: Brow 14; Rebs: L. Whittaker 9 Asts: Dalton 6

Arena Astros, Guadalajara
Attendance: 169
Referees: Nicolás Flores (PAR), Julirys Guzmán (PUR), Ritvars Helmšteins (LAT)

18 August 2026
17:30

Report

South Sudan	61–64	Argentina
Scoring by quarter: 15–17, 9–20, 21–10, 16–17
Pts: Joiner 19; Rebs: Bulgak 15; Asts: Joiner 4		Pts: Mungo 19; Rebs: Gretter 10; Asts: Gretter 7

Arena Astros, Guadalajara
Attendance: 95
Referees: Ahmed Al-Shuwaili (IRQ), Jean Ruhamiriza (RWA), Nataša Dragojević (MNE)

18 August 2026
20:30

Report

New Zealand	53–56	Brazil
Scoring by quarter: 8–12, 14–10, 14–21, 17–13
Pts: L. Whittaker 21; Rebs: L. Whittaker 11; Asts: Hokianga 5		Pts: Guyton 18; Rebs: Moura 7 Asts: Guyton 4

Arena Astros, Guadalajara
Attendance: 435
Referees: Martin Vulić (CRO), Ioannis Agrafiotis (GRE), Laure Coanus (FRA)

20 August 2026
12:00

Report

Brazil	58–53	Argentina
Scoring by quarter: 17–12, 19–15, 9–12, 13–14
Pts: Nascimento 23; Rebs: Rodrigues 8 Asts: Guyton 6		Pts: Mungo 14; Rebs: Cabrera 5 Asts: Gretter 11

Arena Astros, Guadalajara
Attendance: 342
Referees: Julirys Guzmán (PUR), Nataša Dragojević (MNE), Laure Coanus (FRA)

20 August 2026
14:45

Report

New Zealand	82–74	South Sudan
Scoring by quarter: 13–23, 19–16, 23–18, 27–17
Pts: Shearer 32; Rebs: L. Whittaker 11; Asts: Brow 10		Pts: Bulgak 25; Rebs: Bulgak 9 Asts: Joiner 9

Arena Astros, Guadalajara
Attendance: 140
Referees: Ahmed Al-Shuwaili (IRQ), Ritvars Helmšteins (LAT), Kumiko Kumagai (JPN)

=== Group B ===
Pos	Team	Pld	W	L	PF	PA	PD	Pts	Qualification
1	Canada	3	3	0	227	159	+68	6	Semifinals
2	Mexico (H)	3	2	1	204	193	+11	5	Semifinals
3	Philippines	3	1	2	175	221	−46	4	
4	Senegal	3	0	3	197	230	−33	3	

Source: FIBA
Rules for classification: 1) points; 2) head-to-head points; 3) head-to-head points difference; 4) head-to-head number of points scored.
(H) Hosts

17 August 2026
17:30

Report

Canada	72–57	Senegal
Scoring by quarter: 22–14, 19–19, 17–15, 14–9
Pts: Alexander 16; Rebs: Ejim, Wallack 7 Asts: Pellington 6		Pts: Dillard 20; Rebs: Faye, Lo Sylla 4 Asts: Dillard 8

Arena Astros, Guadalajara
Attendance: 145
Referees: Martin Vulić (CRO), Nataša Dragojević (MNE), Juan Cantillo (COL)

17 August 2026
20:30

Report

Mexico	61–58	Philippines
Scoring by quarter: 16–22, 9–15, 15–10, 21–11
Pts: Jeffries 17; Rebs: Jeffries 9 Asts: Lagunas 5		Pts: De Jesus 15; Rebs: Dela Rosa 10; Asts: De Jesus 4

Arena Astros, Guadalajara
Attendance: 1,445
Referees: Laure Coanus (FRA), Ahmed Al-Shuwaili (IRQ), Ioannis Agrafiotis (GRE)

19 August 2026
17:30

Report

Philippines	38–85	Canada
Scoring by quarter: 4–23, 7–23, 18–16, 9–23
Pts: Animam 11; Rebs: Animam 7 Asts: Animam, De Jesus 4		Pts: Swords 15; Rebs: Ejim, Wallack 10; Asts: Bascoe, Gibb 4

Arena Astros, Guadalajara
Attendance: 211
Referees: Ventsislav Velikov (BUL), Ritvars Helmšteins (LAT), Kumiko Kumagai (JPN)

19 August 2026
20:30

Report

Senegal	65–79	Mexico
Scoring by quarter: 11–27, 17–13, 13–22, 24–17
Pts: Dillard 26; Rebs: Faye 13; Asts: Dillard 5		Pts: Pitts 16; Rebs: Valenzuela 7 Asts: three players 5

Arena Astros, Guadalajara
Attendance: 2,273
Referees: Julirys Guzmán (PUR), Jean Ruhamiriza (RWA), Juan Cantillo (COL)

20 August 2026
17:30

Report

Philippines	79–75	Senegal
Scoring by quarter: 18–18, 21–17, 22–15, 18–25
Pts: three players 16; Rebs: Dela Rosa 5 Asts: De Jesus 8		Pts: Dillard 25; Rebs: Gassama 9 Asts: Gueye 4

Arena Astros, Guadalajara
Attendance: 134
Referees: Martin Vulić (CRO), Edwin Quiles (PUR), Ewa Matuszweska (POL)

20 August 2026
20:30

Report

Canada	70–64	Mexico
Scoring by quarter: 23–18, 18–18, 16–17, 13–11
Pts: Bascoe, Swords 17; Rebs: Ejim 11; Asts: three players 3		Pts: Valenzuela 16; Rebs: Valenzuela 11; Asts: Lagunas 4

Arena Astros, Guadalajara
Attendance: 2,499
Referees: Ventsislav Velikov (BUL), Jean Ruhamiriza (RWA), Nicolás Flores (PAR)

== Knockout stage ==
=== Bracket ===
Semi-finals
Mexico	83
Brazil	64
Canada	86
New Zealand	71

Final
Mexico	53
Canada	83

=== Semifinals ===
22 August 2026
17:30

Report

Canada	86–71	New Zealand
Scoring by quarter: 21–18, 36–13, 10–17, 19–23
Pts: Gibb, Swords 17; Rebs: Ejim 11; Asts: Bascoe 8		Pts: L. Whittaker 21; Rebs: L. Whittaker 4 Asts: Shearer 5

Arena Astros, Guadalajara
Attendance: 439
Referees: Julirys Guzmán (PUR), Ioannis Agrafiotis (GRE), Laure Coanus (FRA)

22 August 2026
20:30

Report

Mexico	83–64	Brazil
Scoring by quarter: 16–23, 21–10, 26–16, 20–15
Pts: Jeffries 24; Rebs: Valenzuela 13; Asts: Esquer 8		Pts: Nascimento 17; Rebs: Moura 10; Asts: Albiero 10

Arena Astros, Guadalajara
Attendance: 2,409
Referees: Martin Vulić (CRO), Ahmed Al-Shuwaili (IRQ), Ritvars Helmšteins (LAT)

=== Final ===
23 August 2026
17:30

Report

Mexico	53–83	Canada
Scoring by quarter: 11–26, 15–21, 9–19, 18–17
Pts: Jeffries 13; Rebs: Jeffries 6 Asts: Lagunas 2		Pts: Alexander 14; Rebs: Ejim 17; Asts: Bascoe 10

Arena Astros, Guadalajara
Attendance: 2,632
Referees: Martin Vulić (CRO), Julirys Guzmán (PUR), Ventsislav Velikov (BUL)

== Final standings ==
Pos	Team	Pld	W	L	PF	PA	PD	Pts	Qualification
1st place, gold medalist(s)	Canada	5	5	0	396	283	+113	10	Olympic Qualifying Tournaments
2nd place, silver medalist(s)	Mexico (H)	5	4	1	340	340	0	9	
3	New Zealand	4	2	2	263	251	+12	6	Semfinalists
4	Brazil	4	2	2	239	252	−13	6	Semfinalists
5	Argentina	3	1	2	152	176	−24	4	Third in group stage
6	Philippines	3	1	2	175	221	−46	4	Third in group stage
7	South Sudan	3	1	2	198	207	−9	4	Fourth in group stage
8	Senegal	3	0	3	197	230	−33	3	Fourth in group stage

Source: FIBA
(H) Hosts

== Awards ==
2026 FIBA Women's Olympic Pre-Qualifying Tournament

Canada

Team roster: Agot Makeer, Delaney Gibb, Sami Hill, Shaina Pellington, Tara Wallack, Yvonne Ejim, Jasmine Bascoe, Syla Swords, Kayla Alexander, Avery Howell, Faith Dut, Cearah Parchment.
Head Coach: Nell Fortner

The awards were announced on 24 August 2026.

All-Tournament Team
Players
(Canada) Syla Swords
(Canada) Yvonne Ejim
(Mexico) Anisa Jeffries
(New Zealand) Emilia Shearer
(Brazil) Bella Nascimento
MVP: (Canada) Syla Swords

=== Notable statistics ===
- Most points in a game: 157 (Canada 86–71 New Zealand, 22 August)
- Fewest points in a game: 92 (Argentina 35–57 New Zealand, 17 August)
- Most points by a team in a game: 86 (Canada 86–71 New Zealand, 22 August)
- Fewest points by a team in a game: 35 (Argentina 35–57 New Zealand, 17 August)
- Biggest points difference in a game: 47 (Philippines 38–85 Canada, 19 August)
- Biggest half time deficit in a game: 35 (Philippines 11–46 Canada, 19 August)
- Most points scored by a player in a game: 32 (Emilia Shearer vs South Sudan, 20 August)
- Highest attended game: 2,632 (Mexico 53–83 Canada, 23 August)
- Lowest attended game: 95 (South Sudan 61–64 Argentina, 18 August)

Reference
Gameday 1
Gameday 2
Gameday 3
Gameday 4
Gameday 5
Gameday 6
