= Kai Toews =

Japanese basketball player

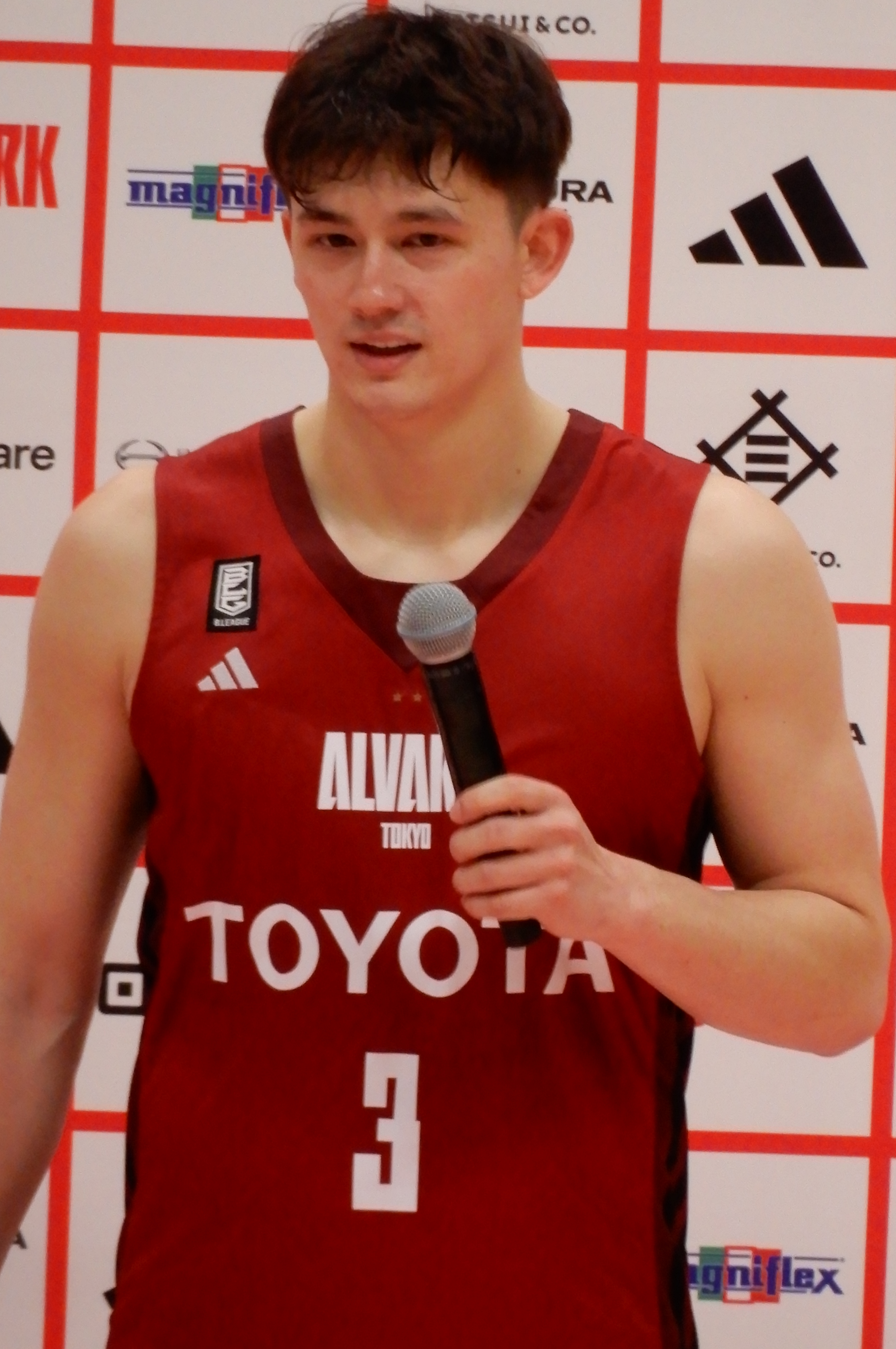
- Toews with Alvark Tokyo in 2024

No. 3 – Alvark Tokyo
- Position: Point guard
- League: B.League

Personal information
- Born: 17 September 1998 (age 28) Kobe, Hyōgo Prefecture, Japan
- Listed height: 6 ft 2 in (1.88 m)
- Listed weight: 180 lb (82 kg)

Career information
- High school: Keihoku (Bunkyō, Tokyo); Northfield Mount Hermon (Northfield, Massachusetts)
- College: UNC Wilmington (2018–2019)
- NBA draft: 2020: undrafted
- Playing career: 2020–present

Career history
- 2020–2022: Utsunomiya Brex
- 2022–2023: Shiga Lakes
- 2023–present: Alvark Tokyo

Career highlights
- CAA All-Rookie Team (2019)
Medals
Men's basketball
Representing Japan
William Jones Cup
| Bronze medal – third place | 2019 Taiwan |

Kai Toews (テーブス海, born September 17, 1998) is a Japanese professional basketball player for Alvark Tokyo of the B. League.

== Early life ==
Toews grew up playing soccer before starting to play basketball in fourth grade. His father, former professional player BT Toews, taught him the fundamentals of the game. Growing up, Toews cited Allen Iverson as his favorite basketball player. Toews attended Keihoku High School for his freshman and sophomore years and was recruited by Japanese universities but had higher ambitions. Toews moved to the United States and attended the Northfield Mount Hermon School in Massachusetts for two years. In his senior season, Toews helped the team to a 31–4 record and the New England Prep Class AAA Championship, earned honorable mention All-NEPSAC honors. UNC Wilmington coach C.B. McGrath offered Toews a scholarship, after seeing him play when McGrath was an assistant at North Carolina.

== College career ==
On November 25, 2018, Toews had a career-high 14 assists against Eastern Illinois. As a freshman, Toews started 32 of 33 games and averaged 8.8 points, 7.7 assists and 2.6 rebounds per game. He finished second in NCAA Division I in assists per game, behind only Murray State's Ja Morant. He set the Colonial Athletic Association single-season assists record with 253 and was named to the CAA All-Rookie Team. Toews was a finalist for the 2019 Kyle Macy Award presented by CollegeInsider.com to the nation's top freshman basketball player. In his sophomore season, Toews started 12 of 13 games for UNC Wilmington and averaged 5.5 points, 4.3 assists, and 2.2 rebounds per game. After the team's game against Vanderbilt on December 21, 2019, Toews announced he was leaving the team to pursue professional opportunities. “Obviously, it was a total surprise to us,” coach McGrath said. Toews finished his career with 362 points, 112 rebounds and 309 assists.

== Professional career ==
=== Utsunomiya Brex (2020–2022) ===
On January 10, 2020, Toews signed a professional contract with the Utsunomiya Brex in Japan.

=== Shiga Lakes (2022–2023) ===
On June 13, 2022, Toews signed with the Shiga Lakes for the 2022–23 B.League season.

=== Alvark Tokyo (2023–present) ===
On June 30, 2023, Toews signed with Alvark Tokyo.

== National team career ==
Toews has played for Japan's Under-15 and Under-19 national teams. Toews competed for Japan in the 2019 William Jones Cup in Taiwan.

== Career statistics ==
Legend
| GP | Games played | GS | Games started | MPG | Minutes per game |
| FG% | Field goal percentage | 3P% | 3-point field goal percentage | FT% | Free throw percentage |
| RPG | Rebounds per game | APG | Assists per game | SPG | Steals per game |
| BPG | Blocks per game | PPG | Points per game | **Bold** | Career high |

=== College ===
| Year | Team | GP | GS | MPG | FG% | 3P% | FT% | RPG | APG | SPG | BPG | PPG |
|---|---|---|---|---|---|---|---|---|---|---|---|---|
| 2018–19 | UNC Wilmington | **33** | **32** | **30.7** | **.405** | .243 | **.756** | **2.6** | **7.7** | .5 | .0 | **8.8** |
| 2019–20 | UNC Wilmington | 13 | 12 | 26.5 | .310 | **.333** | .692 | 2.1 | 4.3 | **.7** | .0 | 5.5 |
| Career | | 46 | 44 | 29.5 | .382 | .268 | .747 | 2.4 | 6.7 | .6 | .0 | 7.9 |

== Personal life ==
His cousin Jonathan Toews is a forward for the Winnipeg Jets in the National Hockey League.
