= 1988 ABC Championship for Women =

1988 FIBA Women's Asia Cup
12th Asian Women's Basketball Championship

Tournament details
- Host country: Hong Kong
- Dates: October 9–18
- Teams: 9 (from all Asian federations)
- Venue: 1 (in 1 host city)

Final positions
- Champions: South Korea (9th title)

The 1988 Asian Basketball Confederation Championship for Women were held in Hong Kong

== Results ==
Team	Pld	W	L	PF	PA	PD	Pts
South Korea	8	8	0	922	364	+558	16
China	8	7	1	893	326	+567	15
Chinese Taipei	8	6	2	778	528	+250	14
Japan	8	5	3	726	476	+250	13
Malaysia	8	4	4	497	729	−232	12
Hong Kong	8	3	5	410	788	−378	11
Thailand	8	2	6	507	727	−220	10
India	8	1	7	444	736	−292	9
Singapore	8	0	8	336	839	−503	8

October 9

Chinese Taipei	120–31	Singapore
Scoring by half: 57–17, 63–14

Hong Kong Coliseum, Hong Kong

October 9

South Korea	160–46	Malaysia
Scoring by half: 73–16, 87–30

Hong Kong Coliseum, Hong Kong

October 9

India	58–69	Hong Kong
Scoring by half: 32–35, 26–34

Hong Kong Coliseum, Hong Kong

October 9

China	92–60	Japan
Scoring by half: 40–28, 52–32

Hong Kong Coliseum, Hong Kong

October 10

Japan	134–47	Hong Kong
Scoring by half: 81–26, 53–21

Hong Kong Coliseum, Hong Kong

October 10

Singapore	59–65	India
Scoring by half: 31–35, 28–30

Hong Kong Coliseum, Hong Kong

October 10

Malaysia	20–115	China
Scoring by half: 10–62, 10–53

Hong Kong Coliseum, Hong Kong

October 10

Thailand	44–117	South Korea
Scoring by half: 32–67, 12–50

Hong Kong Coliseum, Hong Kong

October 11

India	72–77	Thailand
Scoring by half: 39–38, 33–39

Hong Kong Coliseum, Hong Kong

October 11

Malaysia	58–104	Japan
Scoring by half: 31–66, 27–38

Hong Kong Coliseum, Hong Kong

October 11

China	136–28	Singapore
Scoring by half: 74–12, 62–16

Hong Kong Coliseum, Hong Kong

October 11

South Korea	106–73	Chinese Taipei
Scoring by half: 58–32, 48–41

Hong Kong Coliseum, Hong Kong

October 12

Singapore	20–136	South Korea
Scoring by half: 18–68, 2–68

Hong Kong Coliseum, Hong Kong

October 12

Hong Kong	30–137	China
Scoring by half: 17–73, 13–64

Hong Kong Coliseum, Hong Kong

October 12

Chinese Taipei	127–76	Thailand
Scoring by half: 64–36, 63–40

Hong Kong Coliseum, Hong Kong

October 12

India	64–70	Malaysia
Scoring by half: 23–36, 41–34

Hong Kong Coliseum, Hong Kong

October 13

Japan	106–52	India
Scoring by half: 60–28, 46–24

Hong Kong Coliseum, Hong Kong

October 13

South Korea	128–23	Hong Kong
Scoring by half: 61–12, 67–11

Hong Kong Coliseum, Hong Kong

October 13

Malaysia	57–118	Chinese Taipei
Scoring by half: 29–61, 28–57

Hong Kong Coliseum, Hong Kong

October 13

Thailand	106–57	Singapore
Scoring by half: 45–30, 61–27

Hong Kong Coliseum, Hong Kong

October 14

China	127–36	Thailand
Scoring by half: 59–15, 68–21

Hong Kong Coliseum, Hong Kong

October 14

Singapore	33–119	Japan
Scoring by half: 16–61, 17–58

Hong Kong Coliseum, Hong Kong

October 14

Hong Kong	58–92	Malaysia
Scoring by half: 31–46, 27–56

Hong Kong Coliseum, Hong Kong

October 14

India	58–122	Chinese Taipei
Scoring by half: 21–63, 37–59

Hong Kong Coliseum, Hong Kong

October 15

Thailand	61–70	Malaysia
Scoring by half: 35–43, 26–27

Hong Kong Coliseum, Hong Kong

October 15

Chinese Taipei	121–41	Hong Kong
Scoring by half: 67–20, 54–21

Hong Kong Coliseum, Hong Kong

October 15

China	114–45	India
Scoring by half: 56–18, 58–27

Hong Kong Coliseum, Hong Kong

October 15

Japan	56–83	South Korea
Scoring by half: 23–47, 33–36

Hong Kong Coliseum, Hong Kong

October 17

India	30–119	South Korea
Scoring by half: 17–53, 13–66

Hong Kong Coliseum, Hong Kong

October 17

Thailand	48–88	Japan
Scoring by half: 26–52, 22–36

Hong Kong Coliseum, Hong Kong

October 17

Hong Kong	73–59	Singapore
Scoring by half: 38–18, 35–41

Hong Kong Coliseum, Hong Kong

October 17

Chinese Taipei	34–100	China
Scoring by half: 16–40, 18–60

Hong Kong Coliseum, Hong Kong

October 18

Singapore	49–84	Malaysia
Scoring by half: 28–50, 21–34

Hong Kong Coliseum, Hong Kong

October 18

Hong Kong	69–59	Thailand
Scoring by half: 33–29, 36–30

Hong Kong Coliseum, Hong Kong

October 18

Japan	59–63	Chinese Taipei
Scoring by half: 34–37, 25–26

Hong Kong Coliseum, Hong Kong

October 18

China	72–73	South Korea
Scoring by half: 34–33, 38–40

Hong Kong Coliseum, Hong Kong

== Final standing ==
Rank	Team	Record
1st place, gold medalist(s)	South Korea	8–0
2nd place, silver medalist(s)	China	7–1
3rd place, bronze medalist(s)	Chinese Taipei	6–2
4	Japan	5–3
5	Malaysia	4–4
6	Hong Kong	3–5
7	Thailand	2–6
8	India	1–7
9	Singapore	0–8

== Awards ==
1988 Asian champions

South Korea
Ninth title
