= 1965 ABC Championship for Women =

Women's basketball championship

1965 FIBA Women's Asia Cup
1st Asian Women's Basketball Championship

Tournament details
- Host country: South Korea
- Dates: April 20–29
- Teams: 5 (from all Asian confederations)
- Venue: 1 (in 1 host city)

Final positions
- Champions: South Korea (1st title)

The 1965 Asian Basketball Confederation Championship for Women were held in Seoul, South Korea.

== Results ==
| Team | Pld | W | L | PF | PA | PD | Pts |
|---|---|---|---|---|---|---|---|
| South Korea | 8 | 8 | 0 | 754 | 401 | +353 | 16 |
| Japan | 8 | 6 | 2 | 710 | 379 | +331 | 14 |
| Formosa | 8 | 4 | 4 | 531 | 532 | −1 | 12 |
| Philippines | 8 | 2 | 6 | 303 | 631 | −328 | 10 |
| Malaysia | 8 | 0 | 8 | 364 | 719 | −355 | 8 |

April 20

| Formosa | 51–79 | Japan |

Seoul

April 20

| South Korea | 98–28 | Philippines |

Seoul

April 21

| Malaysia | 38–101 | South Korea |

Seoul

April 21

| Philippines | 41–64 | Formosa |

Seoul

April 22

| Japan | 83–30 | Philippines |

Seoul

April 22

| Formosa | 89–46 | Malaysia |

Seoul

April 23

| South Korea | 86–50 | Formosa |

Seoul

April 23

| Malaysia | 29–129 | Japan |

Seoul

April 24

| Philippines | 54–50 | Malaysia |

Seoul

April 24

| Japan | 85–87 (OT) | South Korea |

Seoul

April 25

| Philippines | 22–105 | South Korea |

Seoul

April 25

| Japan | 79–49 | Formosa |

Seoul

April 26

| Formosa | 78–40 | Philippines |

Seoul

April 26

| South Korea | 102–46 | Malaysia |

Seoul

April 27

| Malaysia | 71–93 | Formosa |

Seoul

April 27

| Philippines | 24–93 | Japan |

Seoul

April 28

| Japan | 87–24 | Malaysia |

Seoul

April 28

| Formosa | 57–90 | South Korea |

Seoul

April 29

| Malaysia | 60–64 | Philippines |

Seoul

April 29

| South Korea | 85–75 | Japan |

Seoul

== Final standing ==
| Qualified for the 1967 FIBA World Championship for Women |

| Rank | Team | Record |
|---|---|---|
| 1st place, gold medalist(s) | South Korea | 8–0 |
| 2nd place, silver medalist(s) | Japan | 6–2 |
| 3rd place, bronze medalist(s) | Formosa | 4–4 |
| 4 | Philippines | 2–6 |
| 5 | Malaysia | 0–8 |

== Awards ==
1965 Asian champions

South Korea
First title
