= Cambodia women's national basketball team =

Cambodia
- FIBA ranking: NR (9 February 2025)
- FIBA zone: FIBA Asia
- National federation: Cambodia Basketball Federation

Asia Cup
- Appearances: 1
- Medals: None
Home	Away

The Cambodia women's national basketball team is administered by the Cambodia Basketball Federation. It will feature a 5x5 team, and a 3x3 team at the 2021 Southeast Asian Games.

== Tournament record ==
=== Asia Cup ===
- (South Korea) 1974: 6th

=== Southeast Asian Games ===
- (Cambodia) 2023 - 6th
