= SEABA Championship for Women =

- Current season, competition or edition: 2016 SEABA Championship for Women
- Founded: 1995
- Country: SEABA member nations
- Continent: FIBA Asia (Asia)
- Most recent champion: Philippines (2nd title)
- Most titles: Thailand (4 titles)

The SEABA Championship for Women is a basketball tournament for women's national teams organized by the Southeast Asia Basketball Association, a sub-zone of the FIBA Asia. It serves as a qualifier for different zone and subzone competitions such as FIBA Asia Championship for Women and Southeast Asian Games.

== Summary ==
Year	Host	Final			Third Place Game		
Year	Host	Champion	Score	Second Place	Third Place	Score	Fourth Place
1995; Details	(Thailand); Surat Thani	Thailand	No playoffs	Philippines	Malaysia	No playoffs	
1997; Details	(Thailand); Bangkok	Thailand	No playoffs	Philippines	Malaysia	No playoffs	
1999; Details	(Malaysia); Genting	Malaysia	No playoffs	Thailand	Philippines	No playoffs	
2002; Details	(Thailand); Phuket	Thailand	No playoffs	Malaysia	Philippines	No playoffs	
2004; Details	Singapore	Singapore	No playoffs	Thailand	Malaysia	No playoffs	
2007; Details	(Thailand); Phuket	Thailand	66–49	Philippines	Malaysia	70–49	Indonesia
2010; Details	(Philippines); Manila	Philippines	76–54	Thailand	Malaysia	91–61	Indonesia
2014; Details	(Indonesia); Semarang	Malaysia	65–53	Indonesia	Singapore	No playoffs	—N/a
2016; Details	(Malaysia); Malacca City	Philippines	No playoffs	Malaysia	Singapore	No playoffs	Indonesia

== Medal table ==
Rank	Nation	Gold	Silver	Bronze	Total
1	Thailand	4	3	0	7
2	Philippines	2	3	2	7
3	Malaysia	2	2	5	9
4	Singapore	1	0	2	3
5	Indonesia	0	1	0	1
Totals (5 entries)		9	9	9	27
