= Vietnam women's national basketball team =

Vietnam
- FIBA ranking: NR (18 March 2026)
- Joined FIBA: 1970
- FIBA zone: FIBA Asia
- National federation: VBF

Asia Cup
- Appearances: 3
- Medals: None

The Vietnam women's national basketball team represents Vietnam in international women's basketball.

== Competitions ==
=== Olympic Games ===
- Yet to qualify

=== FIBA Women's Basketball World Cup ===
- Yet to qualify

=== FIBA Women's Asia Cup ===
- (Malaysia) 1970 - 9th (1−8)
- (South Korea) 1974 - 7th (0−5)
- (South Korea) 2007 - 10th (2−3)

=== SEABA Championship for Women ===
- 2016 - 6th

=== Southeast Asian Games ===
==== 5x5 Team ====
- (Thailand) 1995 - 6th (0−5)
- (Indonesia) 1997 - 5th (0−4)
- (Malaysia) 2001 - 5th (0−4)
- (Vietnam) 2003 - 6th (0−5)
- (Singapore) 2015 - 6th (0−5)
- (Malaysia) 2017 - 6th (1−5)
- (Vietnam) 2021 - 5th (2−3)
- (Cambodia) 2023 - 4th (3−3)
- (Thailand) 2025 - 5th (1−2)

==== 3x3 Team ====
- (Philippines) 2019 - 4th (2−3)
- (Vietnam) 2021 - (silver) Silver Medal
- (Cambodia) 2023 - (gold) (5−0)
- (Thailand) 2025 - 4th (2−3)

== See also ==
- Vietnam men's national basketball team
