= 2014 SEABA Championship for Women =

8th Southeast Asian Women's Basketball Championship
- Official logo of the 2014 SEABA Championship for Women

Tournament details
- Host country: Indonesia
- Dates: May 26–29
- Teams: 3 (from 10 federations)
- Venue: 1 (in 1 host city)

Final positions
- Champions: Malaysia (2nd title)

Tournament statistics
- Top scorer: (Indonesia) Christaline (21.0)
- Top rebounds: (Indonesia) Soemaryono (11.3)
- Top assists: (Malaysia) Yaakob (3.0) (Malaysia) Pang H.P. (Singapore) Koh W.B.
- PPG (Team): Malaysia (65.3)
- RPG (Team): Indonesia (44.3)
- APG (Team): Malaysia (15.0); Singapore

The 2014 SEABA Championship for Women was the 8th SEABA Championship for Women. It was held in Semarang, Indonesia from May 26 to May 29, coinciding with the 2014 SEABA Under-18 Championship for Women.

Malaysia defeated Indonesia in the finals, 65–53, to clinch its second title which they last won 15 years ago in Genting in Malaysia.

== Round robin ==
Qualified for the Gold Medal Match

Team	Pld	W	L	PF	PA	PD	Pts	Goal Average
Malaysia	2	1	1	131	113	+18	3	1.159
Indonesia	2	1	1	118	113	+5	3	1.044
Singapore	2	1	1	114	137	–23	3	0.832

May 26
17:00

Live Stats

Indonesia	61–51	Malaysia
Scoring by quarter: 17–9, 19–13, 8–15, 17–14
Pts: Christaline 30; Rebs: Soemaryono 14; Asts: Christaline, Ibo 3		Pts: Yaakob 15; Rebs: Saw W.Y., Ting, Wong M.C. 4 Asts: Ting 4

GOR Sahabat, Semarang
Referees: Watcharin Padungratchadakit (THA), Tan Yee Nee (SIN), Tan Geok Ling (SIN)

May 27
18:00

Live Stats

Singapore	62–57	Indonesia
Scoring by quarter: 17–17, 17–7, 8–20, 20–13
Pts: Poon 18; Rebs: A. Lim 9 Asts: Koh W.B. 5		Pts: Christaline 21; Rebs: Soemaryono, Sutjiono 8 Asts: Christaline, Rohtriastari 3

GOR Sahabat, Semarang
Referees: Editha Botecario (PHI), Chang Yee Chuan (MAS), Lim Sok Hoon (MAS)

May 28
18:00

Live Stats

Malaysia	80–52	Singapore
Scoring by quarter: 23–16, 16–11, 19–14, 22–11
Pts: Pang H.P. 20; Rebs: Pang H.P. 9 Asts: Pang H.P., Yaakob 5		Pts: Poon 19; Rebs: A. Lim 13; Asts: A. Lim, J. Lim, Yoshida 3

GOR Sahabat, Semarang
Referees: Watcharin Padungratchadakit (THA), Sedyo Mukti Wibowo (INA), Rendra Lesmana (INA)

== Final ==
May 29
20:00

Live Stats

Indonesia	53–65	Malaysia
Scoring by quarter: 8–15, 17–18, 18–15, 10–17
Pts: Anggraeni 27; Rebs: Soemaryono 12; Asts: Ibo, Retong, Soemaryono 2		Pts: Yap F.Y. 22; Rebs: Ting 6 Asts: 5 players 2

GOR Sahabat, Semarang
Referees: Watcharin Padungratchadakit (THA), Editha Botecario (PHI), Tan Yee Nee (SIN)

== Final standings ==
Rank	Team
Gold medal	Malaysia
Silver medal	Indonesia
Bronze medal	Singapore

== Awards ==
2014 SEABA champions

Malaysia
Second title
