= 2007 SEABA Championship for Women =

6th Southeast Asian Women's Basketball Championship

Tournament details
- Host country: Thailand
- Dates: October 14–20
- Teams: 5 (from 5 federations)
- Venue: 1 (in 1 host city)

Final positions
- Champions: Thailand (4th title)

Official website
- 2007 6th SEABA Championship for Women

The 2007 SEABA Championship for Women was held in Phuket, Thailand from October 14 to October 20. The Philippines swept all of their assignments in the elimination round and beat Indonesia in the semifinals, but Thailand beat them in the championship match to clinch their fourth title.

== Elimination round ==
=== Round robin ===
Team	Pld	W	L	PF	PA	PD
Philippines	4	4	0	295	254	41
Thailand	4	3	1	337	286	51
Malaysia	4	2	2	324	266	58
Indonesia	4	1	3	238	311	-73
Singapore	4	0	4	238	336	-98

October 14
14:30

Indonesia	58–99	Malaysia
Scoring by half: 34–61, 24–38

Phuket City Municipal Gymnasium, Phuket

October 14
18:00

Thailand	98–56	Singapore
Scoring by half: 44–24, 54–32

Phuket City Municipal Gymnasium, Phuket

October 15
16:00

Singapore	59–70	Indonesia
Scoring by half: 35–28, 24–42

Phuket City Municipal Gymnasium, Phuket

October 15
18:00

Philippines	80–76	Thailand
Scoring by half: 34–32, 46–44

Phuket City Municipal Gymnasium, Phuket

October 16
16:00

Indonesia	54–70	Philippines
Scoring by half: 26–29, 28–41

Phuket City Municipal Gymnasium, Phuket

October 16
18:00

Malaysia	90–64	Singapore
Scoring by half: 53–32, 37–32

Phuket City Municipal Gymnasium, Phuket

October 17
16:00

Singapore	59–78	Philippines
Scoring by half: 30–44, 29–34

Phuket City Municipal Gymnasium, Phuket

October 17
18:00

Thailand	77–70	Malaysia
Scoring by half: 37–33, 40–33

Phuket City Municipal Gymnasium, Phuket

October 18
16:00

Philippines	67–65	Malaysia
Scoring by half: 39–28, 28–37

Phuket City Municipal Gymnasium, Phuket

October 18
18:00

Indonesia	56–83	Thailand
Scoring by half: 38–30, 18–53

Phuket City Municipal Gymnasium, Phuket

== Medal round ==
Semi-finals
October 19
Philippines	72
Indonesia	47
October 19
Thailand	86
Malaysia	80

Final
October 20
Philippines	49
Thailand	66
Third place
October 20
Indonesia	49
Malaysia	70

=== Semifinals ===
October 19
14:00

Philippines	72–47	Indonesia
Scoring by half: 42–27, 30–20

Phuket City Municipal Gymnasium, Phuket

October 19
16:00

Thailand	86–80	Malaysia
Scoring by half: 42–34, 44–46

Phuket City Municipal Gymnasium, Phuket

=== Bronze-medal match ===
October 20
14:00

Indonesia	49–70	Malaysia
Scoring by half: 17–34, 32–36

Phuket City Municipal Gymnasium, Phuket

=== Gold-medal match ===
October 20
16:00

Philippines	49–66	Thailand
Scoring by half: 31–42, 18–24

Phuket City Municipal Gymnasium, Phuket

== Final standings ==
Rank	Team
Gold medal	Thailand
Silver medal	Philippines
Bronze medal	Malaysia
4	Indonesia
5	Singapore

== Awards ==
2007 SEABA champions

Thailand
Fourth title
