= Arena Astros =

Volleyball arena in Guadalajara, Jalisco

- Former names: Pan American Volleyball Complex
- Location: Guadalajara, Jalisco
- Capacity: 4,000

Construction
- Opened: March 10, 2007
- Cost: 40 million pesos

Tenants
- Astros de Jalisco (LNBP) (2019–present); Astros de Jalisco (women) (LNBPF) (2022–2023)

The Arena Astros is an arena in Guadalajara, Jalisco. The arena was opened on March 10, 2007, built at a cost of 40 million pesos. It has a capacity of 4,000 and hosted the volleyball competition at the 2011 Pan American Games. This arena was used on the Pan American Games on 2011. The arena is the home venue of the Astros de Jalisco.

== See also ==
- Volleyball at the 2011 Pan American Games
