= 1974 ABC Championship for Women =

1974 FIBA Women's Asia Cup
5th Asian Women's Basketball Championship

Tournament details
- Host country: South Korea
- Dates: June 22–30
- Teams: 7 (from all Asian federations)
- Venue: 1 (in 1 host city)

Final positions
- Champions: South Korea (4th title)

The 1974 Asian Basketball Confederation Championship for Women were held in Seoul, South Korea.

== Preliminary round ==
=== Group A ===
Team	Pld	W	L	PF	PA	PD	Pts
South Korea	3	3	0	352	94	+258	6
Iran	3	2	1	192	201	−9	5
Hong Kong	3	1	2	156	278	−122	4
South Vietnam	3	0	3	125	252	−127	3

South Korea	141–45	Hong Kong
Scoring by half: 70–16, 71–29

Jangchung Gymnasium, Seoul

Iran	82–49	South Vietnam
Scoring by half: 51–27, 31–22

Jangchung Gymnasium, Seoul

South Vietnam	18–103	South Korea
Scoring by half: 6–59, 12–44

Jangchung Gymnasium, Seoul

Hong Kong	44–79	Iran
Scoring by half: 18–39, 26–40

Jangchung Gymnasium, Seoul

Iran	31–108	South Korea
Scoring by half: 15–60, 16–48

Jangchung Gymnasium, Seoul

South Vietnam	58–67	Hong Kong
Scoring by half: 35–28, 23–39

Jangchung Gymnasium, Seoul

=== Group B ===
Team	Pld	W	L	PF	PA	PD	Pts
Japan	2	2	0	211	76	+135	4
Taiwan	2	1	1	181	118	+63	3
Khmer Republic	2	0	2	54	252	−198	2

Taiwan	119–40	Khmer Republic
Scoring by half: 59–14, 60–26

Jangchung Gymnasium, Seoul

Japan	78–62	Taiwan
Scoring by half: 36–36, 42–26

Jangchung Gymnasium, Seoul

Khmer Republic	14–133	Japan
Scoring by half: 10–69, 4–64

Jangchung Gymnasium, Seoul

== Final round ==
=== Classification 5th–7th ===
Team	Pld	W	L	PF	PA	PD	Pts
Hong Kong	2	2	0	116	101	+15	4
Khmer Republic	2	1	1	118	108	+10	3
South Vietnam	2	0	2	109	134	−25	2

Hong Kong	52–48	Khmer Republic
Scoring by half: 31–21, 21–27

Jangchung Gymnasium, Seoul

South Vietnam	53–64	Hong Kong
Scoring by half: 20–18, 33–46

Jangchung Gymnasium, Seoul

Khmer Republic	70–56	South Vietnam
Scoring by half: 36–26, 34–30

Jangchung Gymnasium, Seoul

=== Championship ===
Team	Pld	W	L	PF	PA	PD	Pts
South Korea	3	3	0	225	172	+53	6
Japan	3	2	1	277	178	+99	5
Taiwan	3	1	2	223	220	+3	4
Iran	3	0	3	111	266	−155	3

Japan	108–29	Iran
Scoring by half: 57–21, 51–8

Jangchung Gymnasium, Seoul

South Korea	74–67	Taiwan
Scoring by half: 35–29, 39–38

Jangchung Gymnasium, Seoul

South Korea	75–35	Iran
Scoring by half: 48–19, 27–16

Jangchung Gymnasium, Seoul

Japan	99–73	Taiwan
Scoring by half: 44–43, 55–30

Jangchung Gymnasium, Seoul

Taiwan	83–47	Iran
Scoring by half: 46–19, 37–28

Jangchung Gymnasium, Seoul

South Korea	76–70	Japan
Scoring by half: 37–39, 39–31

Jangchung Gymnasium, Seoul

== Final standing ==
Qualified for the 1975 FIBA World Championship for Women

Rank	Team	Record
1st place, gold medalist(s)	South Korea	6–0
2nd place, silver medalist(s)	Japan	4–1
3rd place, bronze medalist(s)	Taiwan	2–3
4	Iran	2–4
5	Hong Kong	3–2
6	Khmer Republic	1–3
7	South Vietnam	0–5

== Awards ==
1974 Asian champions

South Korea
Fourth title
