= Singapore women's national basketball team =

National basketball team of Singapore

Singapore
- FIBA ranking: ▲ (18 March 2026)
- Joined FIBA: 1963
- FIBA zone: FIBA Asia
- National federation: Basketball Association of Singapore (BAS)
- Coach: Kirk Murad

Olympic Games
- Appearances: None

World Cup
- Appearances: None

Asia Cup
- Appearances: 14
- Medals: None
Home	Away

The Singapore women's national basketball team is the national basketball team of Singapore. It is managed by the Basketball Association of Singapore (BAS), formerly the Singapore Amateur Basketball Association (SABA).

== Competitions ==
=== Southeast Asian Games ===
- 2023 - 7th place
- 2025 - 6th place

=== SEABA Championship for Women ===
Southeast Asian Championship Record
Year	Position	Pld	W	L
(Thailand) 1995	-	-	-	-
(Thailand) 1997	-	-	-	-
(Malaysia) 1999	-	-	-	-
(Thailand) 2002	-	-	-	-
(Singapore) 2004	1st place	-	-	-
(Thailand) 2007	5th place	4	0	4
(Philippines) 2010	5th place	4	0	4
(Indonesia) 2014	3rd place	2	1	1
(Malaysia) 2016	3rd place	6	4	2
Total	1 gold, 2 bronze	5–11 (incomplete)		

== Team roster ==
Roster for 2025 SEA Games

Ariel LOITER Xiang Ying	CHAN Chu Yin	Jessie NAR Jie Shi	LIM Jia Min
LIM Yi Jieh Edna	LIM Zhi Yan Amanda	LOW Engie (LIU Enqi)	SEE Kai Ting Shermaine
TAN Wei Xuan Rachel	WAN Shi Ting Dawn	WONG Shuting Valentia	YEOW Jia Ying Crystal

Roster for 2023 SEA Games

#1 CHOO Jie Ying	#2 YEOW Jia Ying Crystal	#3 ONG Ting Hui Helene	#5 CHAN Chu Ying
#6 LIM Jia Min	#7 SEE Kai Ting Shermaine	#9 LIM Zhi Yan Amanda	#11 LIM Yi Jieh Edna
#13 WONG Xiu Wen Adeline	#17 LIM Ler Kar	#19 LIM Rui Jia Alanna	#20 CHIN Wan Qing

Roster for the 2017 FIBA Women's Asia Cup.

Singapore women's national basketball team roster
Players
Coaches

Pos.	No.	Name	Age – Date of birth	Height	Club	Ctr.
G	1	Jacqueline Jia Jia Chu	26 – 8 February 1991	1.63 m (5 ft 4 in)	Adroit	(Singapore)
C	5	Siew Ting Pauline Ang	23 – 6 January 1994	1.78 m (5 ft 10 in)	Qian Xi	(Singapore)
G	6	Jia Min Lim	25 – 8 August 1991	1.65 m (5 ft 5 in)	Qian Xi	(Singapore)
G	7	Kai Ting Shermaine Lee	23 – 27 April 1994	1.62 m (5 ft 4 in)	Hillcrest Grays	(Singapore)
F	8	Jayne Sarah En Min Tan	27 – 28 August 1989	1.70 m (5 ft 7 in)	Qian Xi	(Singapore)
G	9	Zhi Yan Amanda Lim	21 – 27 June 1996	1.64 m (5 ft 5 in)	Siglap	(Singapore)
G	11	Wei Bin Koh	31 – 12 January 1986	1.65 m (5 ft 5 in)	Qian Xi	(Singapore)
G	12	Choy Ting Tang	24 – 18 July 1993	1.73 m (5 ft 8 in)	Qian Xi	(Singapore)
F	15	Cheryl Poon	29 – 20 August 1987	1.62 m (5 ft 4 in)	Hillcrest Grays	(Singapore)
C	19	Rui Jia Alanna Lim	22 – 10 November 1994	1.72 m (5 ft 8 in)	Qian Xi	(Singapore)
F	21	Yukie Yoshida	27 – 4 June 1990	1.75 m (5 ft 9 in)	Hillcrest Grays	(Singapore)
G	22	Ariel Xiang Ying Loiter	15 – 19 March 2002	1.65 m (5 ft 5 in)	Hillcrest Grays	(Singapore)

Head coach

- (United States) Kirk Murad

Assistant coach(es)

- (Singapore) Ho Yoke Mei

Legend

- Club – describes last
  club before the tournament
- Age – describes age
  on 23 July 2017

== Head coaches ==
- (Singapore) Chiew Poh Leng (2007)
- (Singapore) Chiew Poh Leng (2011)
- (United States) Kirk Murad (2017)
- (Singapore) Tan Yee Nee (2023)

== See also ==
- Singapore national under-19 basketball team
- Singapore national under-17 basketball team
- National Basketball League
