= Tantoy Ferrer =

Filipino basketball player (born 1999)

RK Hoops–Quezon City
- League: WMPBL

Personal information
- Born: May 26, 1999 (age 27)
- Listed height: 5 ft 7 in (170 cm)

Career information
- College: UST
- Playing career: 2025–present

Career history
- 2025: Discovery Perlas
- 2026–present: RK Hoops–Quezon City

Career highlights
- WMPBL Mythical Team (2026); UAAP champion (2023); UAAP Finals MVP (2023)

Reynalyn "Tantoy" Ferrer (born May 26, 1999) is a Filipino professional basketball player. She also represents the Philippine national team in international 3x3 basketball competitions.

== College ==
Ferrer was recruited to join the UST Growling Tigresses of the University Athletic Association of the Philippines (UAAP) back in 2018 by coach Haydee Ong.She was named rookie of the year in her debut in Season 81

She suffered from a ACL injury during her participation at the 3x3 tournament of the Season 84 in 2022 rendering her unavailable for the entire Season 85. She recovered and helped UST win the 5x5 women's title in her senior year during Season 86 in 2023. Ferrer was named Finals MVP.

== Club ==
Ferrer played for Discovery Perlas in the 2025 Invitational Tournament of the Women's Maharlika Pilipinas Basketball League. She also featured for Discovery in the inaugural 2025 regular season.

For the 2026 season, Ferrer joined the RK Hoops–Quezon City.

== National team ==
Ferrer has played for the Philippines women's national 3x3 team. She was part of the youth team which took part at the 2017 FIBA 3x3 U18 Asia Cup She later became part of the senior team and took part at the 2025 SEA Games in Thailand and the 2026 FIBA 3x3 World Cup Qualifiers in Singapore.
