= Stefanie Berberabe =

American-Filipino basketball player

Rockingham Flames
- Position: Guard
- League: NBL1 West

Personal information
- Born: July 13, 2000 (age 26) Norwalk, California, U.S.
- Listed height: 5 ft 4 in (1.63 m)

Career information
- High school: St. Joseph (Lakewood, California)
- College: Westmont (2018–2023)
- Playing career: 2025–present

Career history
- 2025: Joondalup Wolves
- 2025: Tagaytay 'Tol Patriots
- 2026–present: Rockingham Flames
- 2026–present: Pasig Queenpin

Career highlights
- NBL1 West Golden Hands (2025); NAIA D1 champion (2021); NAIA D1 Tournament MVP (2021); NAIA Player of the Year (2021); 3× NAIA First Team All-American (2021–2023); 2× GSAC Player of the Year (2021, 2022); 4× First-team All-GSAC (2020–2023)

Stefanie Ann Berberabe (born July 13, 2000) is an American-Filipino basketball player for the Rockingham Flames of the NBL1 West. She played college basketball for the Westmont Warriors in the United States before joining the NU Lady Bulldogs in the Philippines and later debuting for the Philippines women's national basketball team.

== Early life and high school ==
Berberabe was born on July 13, 2000, in Norwalk, California to Filipino parents in the United States. Her father, who hails from Batangas, introduced Berberabe to basketball when she was eight years old.

Berberabe attended St. Joseph High School in Lakewood. She played for the St. Joseph Jesters girls' team, helping them win a Camino Real League title, the school's first league title in more than 25 years when she was a freshman. In her sophomore year she scored her 1,000th career point.

== College career ==
After graduating from St. Joseph, Berberabe was not a sought after player which she attributes to her small stature. Westmont College of the National Association of Intercollegiate Athletics (NAIA) invited her to the team, where she played for five years. She debuted for the Westmont Warriors in 2018. Her team won the 2021 NAIA Division I women's title.

Berberabe went to the Philippines in 2023 to play for the NU Lady Bulldogs for the Season 86 of the University Athletic Association of the Philippines (UAAP). NU finished as runners-up to the UST Growling Tigresses in the sole season Berberabe played.

== Professional career ==
In February 2025, Berberabe signed with the Joondalup Wolves of the NBL1 West for the 2025 season. She earned the league's Golden Hands Award. In 19 games, she averaged 12.84 points, 3.37 rebounds, 4.68 assists and 3.16 steals per game.

Following the NBL1 West season, Berberabe joined Tagaytay 'Tol Patriots of the Women's Maharlika Pilipinas Basketball League (WMPBL). On August 24, 2025, Berberabe became the first Filipina to achieve a quadruple-double in a Philippine professional basketball game and just the third player to do so after Donbel Belano and Kyt Jimenez.

In March 2026, Berberabe signed with the Rockingham Flames for the 2026 NBL1 West season.

== National team ==
Berberabe took part at the U.S.-based try-outs for the Philippine women's national team in 2021 amidst the COVID-19 pandemic.The event was led by head coach Patrick Aquino and the Fil-Am Nation organization. She also had to acquire a Philippine passport to be eligible. In 2022, she was invited to join the Philippine team which won the women's basketball gold medal at the 2021 Sea Games in Hanoi. She also played in the 2022 Asian Games in October 2023 in China and the 2023 SEA Games in Cambodia as well.

She was also called up for the 2024 William Jones Cup and the 2026 FIBA Women's Basketball World Cup Pre-Qualifying Tournament in Rwanda.
