= Chack Cabinbin =

Filipino basketball player

Biñan Tatak Gel Angels
- Position: Guard
- League: WMPBL

Personal information
- Born: December 6, 1991 (age 34)
- Listed height: 5 ft 2 in (1.57 m)

Career history
- 2018: NS Matrix
- 2025: Pilipinas Aguilas
- 2025: San Juan Lady Knights
- 2026-present: Biñan Tatak Gel Angels

Career highlights
- WMPBL Invitational champion (2025)

France Mae "Chack" Cabinbin (born December 6, 1991) is a Filipina professional basketball player who last played for the Biñan Tatak Gel Angels of the Women's Maharlika Pilipinas Basketball League (WMPBL).

== Career ==
=== Club ===
Cabinbin played as the team captain the Pilipinas Aguilas of the Women's Maharlika Pilipinas Basketball League (WMPBL) during the 2025 Invitational Tournament. Despite sustaining a shoulder injury in the semifinals,

For the inaugural 2025 WMPBL regular season, Cabinbin joined the San Juan Lady Knights.

=== National team ===
France Cabinbin has long been part of the Philippine national team. She played in the 2017, 2019, 2021 and 2023 editions of the FIBA Women's Asia Cup.

Cabinbin was also part of the squad which won the Philippines' first ever women's basketball gold at the 2019 SEA Games. Cabinbin is still part of the team which defended the title at the 2021 SEA Games. In the 2023 SEA Games, the team finished second.

Cabinbin's potential return to the national team in the upcoming 2025 FIBA Women's Asia Cup is uncertain due to her commitment with the Army.

== Personal life ==
Cabinbin is part of the Philippine Army having served the role of a proctor.
