= Lexi Pana =

American-Filipino basketball player (born 1998)

No. 15 – Musel Pikes
- Position: Point guard
- League: Luxembourg Basketball League

Personal information
- Born: August 23, 1998 (age 28) Hilo, Hawaii, U.S.
- Listed height: 5 ft 9 in (1.75 m)

Career information
- High school: Hilo (Hilo, Hawaii)
- College: Central Washington (2016–2020)
- Playing career: 2021–present

Career history
- 2021–2022: CSM Alexandria
- 2022: Gisa Lions MBC
- 2022–2023: Amicale Steesel
- 2023–2024: CS Universitatea Cluj-Napoca
- 2024: Vilniaus Kibirkstis-MRU
- 2025: Pilipinas Aguilas
- 2025–present: Musel Pikes
- 2026–present: Goldfields Giants

Alexis Pana (born August 23, 1998) is an American-Filipino professional basketball player for Musel Pikes of the Luxembourg Basketball League. She is also contracted with the Goldfields Giants of the NBL1 West. She played college basketball for the Central Washington Wildcats.

== Early life ==
Pana was born in Hilo, Hawaii, to a Filipino mother and a Hawaiian father. She and her siblings learned basketball from her father who once competed at a high school level. She attended Hilo High School.

== College career ==
Pana played for the Central Washington Wildcats in the NCAA Division I from 2016 to 2020.

== Professional career ==
In June 2021, after having the start of her professional career delayed due to the COVID-19 pandemic, Pana became the first CWU women's basketball player to sign a professional contract when she joined CSM Alexandria of the Romanian Liga Națională. In 28 games during the 2021–22 season, she averaged 13.5 points, 6.1 rebounds, 4.2 assists and 2.7 steals per game.

For the 2022–23 season, Pana joined Gisa Lions MBC of the German Bundesliga. She was one of four non-EU players on its squad, with only three being allowed to be used per game. In December 2022, she joined Amicale Steesel of the Luxembourg Basketball League. In 13 games for Amicale Steesel to finish the 2022–23 season, she averaged 13.0 points, 4.8 rebounds, 3.3 assists and 1.5 steals per game.

For the 2023–24 season, Pana joined CS Universitatea Cluj-Napoca of the Romanian Liga Națională.

For the 2024–25 season, Pana joined Vilniaus Kibirkstis-MRU of the Lithuanian Moterų Krepšinio Lyga. She left the team in December 2024 after six league games and seven Eurocup games.

In 2025, Pana played for Pilipinas Aguilas in the 2025 Invitational Tournament of the Women's Maharlika Pilipinas Basketball League (WMPBL). The Aguilas won the tournament against the UST Golden Tigresses in the finals with Pana named as the Finals MVP. She left the team thereafter.

In November 2025, Pana joined Musel Pikes of the Luxembourg Basketball League.

She is set to join the Goldfields Giants of the NBL1 West in Australia for the 2026 season.

In June 2026, Pana was signed in by Cheongju KB Stars for the 2026–27 season of the Women's Korean Basketball League.

== National team ==
Pana is unable to play for the Philippines national 5-on-5 team as a "local" under FIBA eligibility rules since she was not able to acquire a Philippine passport before reaching the age of 16. She can only play as a "naturalized" player, only one of which is allowed to play in a national team at a time.

Pana however has played for the Philippines national 3x3 team where such restrictions are more lenient. She has represented the country at the FIBA 3×3 Women's Series in 2025.
