= Pocholo Villanueva =

Filipino basketball player and coach

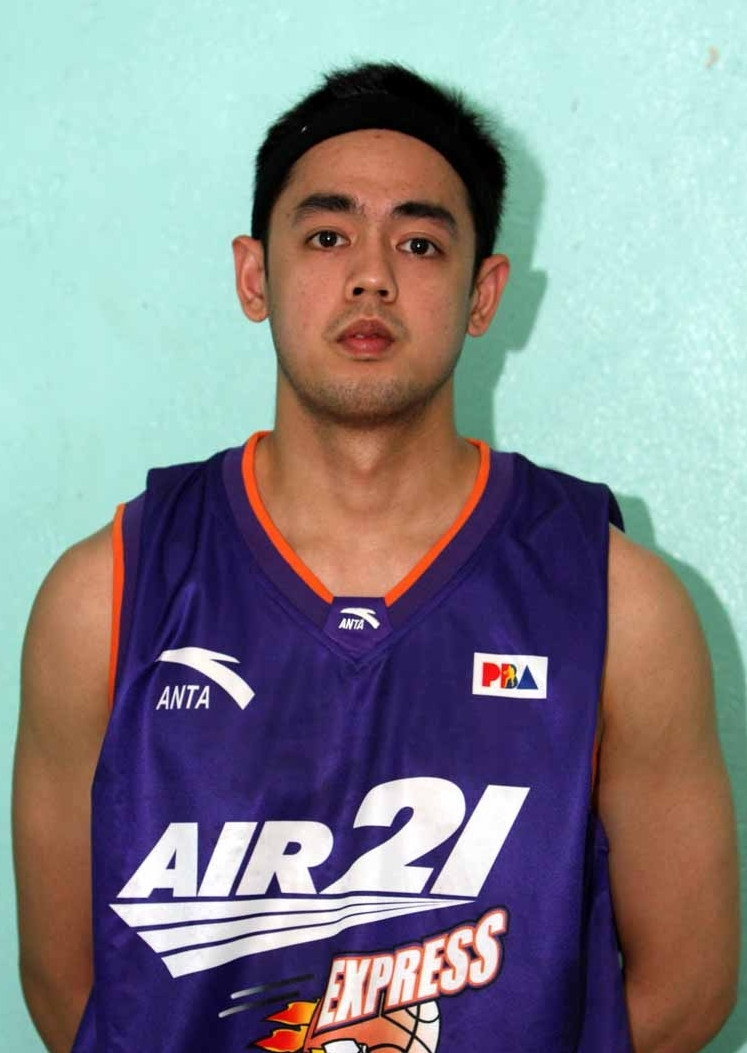
- Villanueva in 2008

Batangas City Athletics
- Title: Head coach
- League: MPBL

Personal information
- Born: November 24, 1982 (age 43)
- Listed height: 6 ft 1 in (1.85 m)
- Listed weight: 180 lb (82 kg)

Career information
- High school: Colegio San Agustin Makati
- College: De La Salle
- PBA draft: 2008: 2nd round, 13th overall pick
- Drafted by: Air21 Express
- Playing career: 2008–2011
- Position: Shooting guard
- Coaching career: 2011–present

Career history

Playing
- 2008–2011: Burger King Whoppers / Air21 Express

Coaching
- 2011–2014: Air21 Express (assistant)
- 2014–2018: JRU (men) (assistant)
- 2016–2018: GlobalPort Batang Pier (assistant)
- 2016–present: De La Salle (women)
- 2018–2019: Makati Skyscrapers / Super Crunch
- 2021: Manila Stars
- 2022–present: Tanduay Rum Masters / Batangas City Embassy Chill / Athletics
- 2022–2023: Bay Area Dragons (assistant)
- 2025–present: Batangas New Zealand Bluefire

Career highlights
- As player: 2× UAAP champion (2001, 2007); UAAP Finals MVP (2007); As head coach: Women's Maharlika Pilipinas Basketball League (2025)

Pocholo "Cholo" Iñigo Villanueva (born November 24, 1982) is a Filipino former professional basketball player. He currently serves as the head coach for the Batangas City Athletics and Batangas New Zealand Bluefire. He previously served as the assistant coach for the Bay Area Dragons. He was drafted with the thirteenth overall pick of the 2008 PBA draft by the Air21 Express. From 2001 to 2007, he played for the De La Salle Green Archers in the UAAP where he won a championship in 2007 and was named co-Finals MVP with JVee Casio.

== Professional career ==
Barangay Ginebra traded Paul Artadi, Rafi Reavis, and the rights to 2009 PBA draft 8th pick overall Chris Timberlake for Enrico Villanueva, Rich Alvarez, Celino Cruz, and Paolo Bugia of Purefoods. Burger King acted as the conduit team, trading Villanueva to Ginebra and acquiring the rights to 2009 Rookie draft eighteenth pick Orlando Daroya and future picks. However, he chose to retire and pursue a career in coaching.

== Coaching career ==
On 2011, Villanueva joined his former coach in La Salle, Franz Pumaren as the assistant coach in then newly formed PBA team, Shopinas.com Clickers. The team was later renamed as Air21 Express. He stayed as assistant coach and team manager until the team was bought by NLEX Road Warriors in July 2014.

In March 2014, he joined the coaching staff of JRU Heavy Bombers under the leadership of Vergel Meneses. He helped them get into the Final Four of the NCAA once again.

In 2018, Villanueva joined the Makati Skyscrapers (later the Makati Super Crunch) of the Maharlika Pilipinas Basketball League (MPBL), leading Makati to a 21–4 record in the 2018–19 MPBL season, and up to a 20–4 record in 2019 before resigning in December 2019, citing Makati's management "has a different direction" for the team.

In 2021, Villanueva returned to the MPBL to coach the Manila Stars for the 2021 MPBL Invitational.

After his stint in Manila, in February 2022, Villanueva was confirmed as the head coach for Batangas City of the MPBL and Filbasket (where it competes as the Tanduay Rum Masters), bringing over the core of the old Makati team that he handled from 2018 to 2019.

In 2022, Villanueva was named as assistant coach of Hong Kong–based team Bay Area Dragons.

=== As program director ===
In 2022, Villanueva became the program director of the La Salle Greenies, the high school team of his college alma mater. He hired his former teammate Renren Ritualo, to be its head coach.

== Personal life ==
Villanueva married his college sweetheart, former DLSU courtside reporter, Agnes Tapia in a ceremony at Santuario de San Antonio Parish on December 12, 2012. Reception followed at the Filoil Flying V Arena, which was transformed from a basketball court to a formal red carpet event.
