= Kaye Pingol =

Filipina basketball player (born 1998)

Uratex Dream

Personal information
- Born: September 30, 1998 (age 28)
- Listed height: 5 ft 6 in (167 cm)

Career information
- College: Adamson (2013–2016); NU (2018–2019)
- Playing career: 2021–present

Career history
- 2021–present: Uratex Dream
- 2023: Jumpshot

Career highlights
- 2x UAAP champion (2018–2019); PBA Women's 3x3 Invitational champion (2024)

Kaye T. Pingol (born September 30, 1998) is a Filipina basketball player who plays for the 3x3 club, Uratex Dream.

== Early life and education ==
Hailing from Pototan, Iloilo, Kaye Pingol was born on September 30, 1998. She and her sister Karl Ann took up basketball in their high school years. They learned the sport from Pototan National High School coach Stephen Guanco. Pingol attended Adamson University before moving to the National University where she obtained degree in financial management.

== Career ==
=== Collegiate ===
Pingol initially played for the Adamson Lady Falcons in the University Athletic Association of the Philippines (UAAP) for three years. Her last stint with Adamson was in 2016, when the Lady Falcons finished third in UAAP Season 79. She later moved schools and suited up for the NU Lady Bulldogs. Pingol helped NU win the Seasons 81 and 82 championships in 2018 and 2019 respectively.

=== 3x3 basketball ===
==== Club ====
Pingol has played 3x3 basketball for Uratex Dream since 2021. She helped Uratex win the 2024 PBA Women's 3x3 Invitational title.

Uratex has repeatedly took part at the Red Bull Half Court World Final. They finished as quarterfinalist in the edition in Belgrade, and later as runners-up in 2024 edition in New York.

At the 2023 Shinhan Bank SOL WKBL 3x3 Triple Jam, Pingol guested with Singaporean club Jumpshot.

==== National team ====
Kaye Pingol has been part of the Philippines women's national 3x3 team. She has played in the 2024 FIBA 3x3 Asia Cup where the Philippines finished fourth.
