= AsiaBasket International Championship =

The AsiaBasket International Championship is a recurring tournament in AsiaBasket, which includes the following:

- 2022 FilBasket International Championship, the last tournament under the FilBasket name
- 2023 AsiaBasket International Championship, the first tournament under the AsiaBasket name
- 2024 AsiaBasket International Championship
- 2025 AsiaBasket International Invitational
