= Mikka Cacho =

Filipino basketball player (born 1998)

Personal information
- Born: January 19, 1998 (age 28)
- Listed height: 5 ft 7 in (171 cm)

Career information
- College: NU
- Playing career: 2023–present
- Position: Small forward

Career history
- 2023–2024: Uratex Dream (3x3)
- 2024: Gilas A (3x3)

Career highlights
- 5× UAAP champion (2016, 2017, 2018, 2019, 2022)

Mikka Wamil Cacho (born January 19, 1998) is a Filipina basketball player.

== Career ==
=== Collegiate ===
Cacho played for the NU Lady Bulldogs in the University Athletic Association of the Philippines (UAAP) She played all five years of eligibility with NU. The UAAP women's basketball tournament went on a hiatus from 2019 to 2022 due to the COVID-19 pandemic. In UAAP Season 85, her last year, she became captain but sustained an knee injury. Cacho eventually recovered to help the Lady Bulldogs win their seventh consecutive title.

=== 3x3 club ===
Cacho joined Uratex Dream in 2023 and helped them win the Red Bull Half Court National Finals qualifying for the Red Bull 3x3 World Finals in Serbia. In that tournament, Cacho and Uratex finished as quarterfinalists, after losing to a team from Australia.

At the 2024 PBA Women's 3x3 Invitational, Cacho played for the Gilas A team.

=== National team ===
==== Philippines ====
Cacho has been part of the Philippines women's national team. She has played in the 2023 FIBA Asia Women's Cup.

==== Philippines 3x3 ====
Cacho has played for the Philippines women's national 3x3 team. She was a reserve player for the Philippines in the 2022 FIBA 3x3 Asia Cup. She was later named part of the main team for the 2024 and 2025 editions.

She has played 3x3 in the SEA Games. She was part of the team which won a silver medal in the 2023 edition in Cambodia. She reprised her role in the 2025 SEA Games but the team failed to medal.

Cacho helped the Philippines earn a berth at the 2026 FIBA 3x3 World Cup via the April 2026 qualifier in Singapore.

Cacho represented the Philippines at the 2026 Asian Beach Games in Sanya, China and won the women's 3x3 silver medal.

== Personal life ==
Cacho hails from Muñoz, Nueva Ecija.
