= 2026 WMPBL season =

2nd season of the Women's Maharlika Pilipinas Basketball League

Tournament details
- Country: Philippines
- Dates: Regular season: April 12 – June 21; Playoffs: June 24 – July 15
- Teams: 6

Final positions
- Champions: Akari Sparks Rizal
- Runners-up: Batangas New Zealand Bluefire

Awards
- MVP: Allana Lim (Rizal)

The 2026 WMPBL season is the ongoing second regular season of the Women's Maharlika Pilipinas Basketball League as a professional league.

It follows the inaugural draft, which was held on February 15, 2025 at Xentromall, Rodriguez, Rizal. The WMPBL season itself commenced on April 12, 2026 at Alonte Sports Arena in Biñan, Laguna.

Batangas-New Zealand Bluefire are the defending champions.

== Format ==
The 2026 regular season will start with the elimination round where all six participating teams will figure in a double round robin. The top two teams will earn a bye to the semifinals. The remaining teams will advance to the semifinals where the third and fourth ranking teams having a twice-to-beat advantage. The semifinals and the finals will be a best-of-three series.

== Teams ==
Six professional teams will take part at the 2026 WMPBL season. The Akari Sparks, Biñan Tatak Gel Angels, Caloocan Lady Kankaloo, and Pasig Queenpin will make their debut while Discovery Perlas, Pangasinan Solar Home Suns, San Juan Lady Knights, and Tagaytay 'Tol Patriots will take their leave of absence.

Bold text indicates new teams.

- **Akari Sparks Rizal**
- Batangas New Zealand Bluefire
- **Biñan Tatak Gel Angels**
- **Caloocan Lady Kankaloo**
- RK Hoops–Quezon City
- **Pasig Queenpin**

== Elimination round ==
Pos	Team	Pld	W	L	PF	PA	PD	GB	Qualification
1	Akari Sparks Rizal	10	9	1	807	623	+184	—	Semifinals
2	Batangas New Zealand Blufire	10	8	2	851	655	+196	1	Semifinals
3	Biñan Tatak Gel Angels	10	7	3	794	686	+108	2	Twice-to-beat in quarterfinals
4	RK Hoops–Quezon City	10	3	7	671	786	−115	6	Twice-to-beat in quarterfinals
5	Pasig Queenpin	10	2	8	682	798	−116	7	Twice-to-win in quarterfinals
6	Caloocan Lady Kankaloo	10	1	9	626	883	−257	8	Twice-to-win in quarterfinals

Rules for classification: 1) Wins; 2a) If two teams are tied, head-to-head match-up and aggregate; 2b) If three or more teams are tied, head-to-head point differential; 3) overall point differential; 4) coin toss.

=== Results ===
Team	Game									
Team	1	2	3	4	5	6	7	8	9	10
Batangas (BTG)	CAL; 85–53	BIN; 79–83*	QC; 108–61	RZL; 72–56	PSG; 93–65	BIN; 92–85	QC; 96–69	RZL; 58–74	PSG; 80–52	CAL; 88–57
Biñan (BIN)	QC; 66–46	BTG; 83–79*	PSG; 91–73	CAL; 102–67	RZL; 80–86	BTG; 85–92	PSG; 77–72	RZL; 48–52	CAL; 87–48	QC; 75–71
Caloocan (CAL)	BTG; 53–85	QC; 60–68	RZL; 65–100	BIN; 67–102	PSG; 77–68	PSG; 66–99	RZL; 67–100	BIN; 48–87	QC; 66–86	BTG; 57–88
Pasig (PSG)	RZL; 60–78	QC; 68–67	BIN; 73–91	CAL; 68–77	BTG; 65–93	QC; 74–81	CAL; 99–66	BIN; 72–77	BTG; 52–80	RZL; 51–88
Quezon City (QC)	BIN; 46–66	CAL; 68–60	PSG; 67–68	BTG; 61–108	RZL; 50–84	PSG; 81–74	RZL; 72–89	BTG; 69–96	CAL; 86–66	BIN; 71–75
Rizal (RZL)	PSG; 78–60	CAL; 100–65	BTG; 56–72	QC; 84–50	BIN; 86–80	QC; 89–72	CAL; 100–67	BIN; 52–48	BTG; 74–58	PSG; 88–51

Legend: Blue = win; Red = loss; Matches with lighter background shading were decided after overtime. (*) Number of asterisks denotes number of overtime periods

== Playoffs ==
Teams in bold advanced to the next round. Teams in italics have twice-to-beat advantage for the series.

Quarterfinals
(4 – twice-to-beat)
4	**Quezon City**	**53**
5	Pasig	49
(3 – twice-to-beat)
3	**Biñan**	**87**
6	Caloocan	74

Semifinals (best-of-three)
1	**Rizal**	**2**
4	Quezon City	0
2	**Batangas**	**2**
3	Biñan	0

Finals (best-of-three)
1	**Rizal**	**2**
2	Batangas	1

=== Quarterfinals ===
==== (3) Biñan Tatak Gel Angels vs. (6) Caloocan Lady Kankaloo ====
June 24
4:00 p.m.

Boxscore

Caloocan Lady Kankaloo	74–**87**	**Biñan Tatak Gel Angels**
Scoring by quarter: **16**–15, 14–**31**, **21**–16, 23–**25**
Pts: Capilit 18; Rebs: Pedregosa 16; Asts: Capilit 7		Pts: Del Carmen 22; Rebs: Faraon 13; Asts: Domingo 8
**Biñan wins series**

Parañaque Coliseum, Parañaque

==== (4) RK Hoops Quezon City vs. (5) Queenpin Pasig ====
June 24
6:00 p.m.

Boxscore

Queenpin Pasig	49–**53**	**RK Hoops Quezon City**
Scoring by quarter: 15–15, 13–**14**, **17**–10, 4–**15**
Pts: Sario 22; Rebs: Cancio 11; Asts: Padilla 6		Pts: Panti 15; Rebs: Panti 16; Asts: Isip 4
**Quezon City wins series**

Parañaque Coliseum, Parañaque

=== Semifinals ===
==== (1) Akari Sparks Rizal vs. (4) RK Hoops Quezon City ====
June 28
4:00 p.m.

Boxscore

RK Hoops Quezon City	67–**93**	**Akari Sparks Rizal**
Scoring by quarter: 13–**25**, 11–**27**, **22**–18, 21–**23**
Pts: Ferrer 21; Rebs: Panti 11; Asts: Ferrer 9		Pts: Pontejos 24; Rebs: three players 6 Asts: Palmera-Dy 10
**Rizal leads series, 1–0**

Parañaque Coliseum, Parañaque

July 1
6:00 p.m.

Boxscore

**Akari Sparks Rizal**	**102**–65	RK Hoops Quezon City
Scoring by quarter: **29**–13, 14–**18**, **31**–23, **28**–11
Pts: Prado 15; Rebs: three players 6 Asts: Palmera-Dy 10		Pts: Ferrer 15; Rebs: Ferrer 10; Asts: Ferrer 6
**Rizal wins series, 2–0**

Parañaque Coliseum, Parañaque

==== (2) Batangas New Zealand Bluefire vs. (3) Biñan Tatak Gel Angels ====
June 28
6:00 p.m.

Boxscore

Biñan Tatak Gel Angels	64–**75**	**Batangas New Zealand Bluefire**
Scoring by quarter: 22–**26**, 12–**16**, **16**–13, 14–**20**
Pts: Del Carmen 18; Rebs: Abaca 9 Asts: Abaca, Del Carmen 5		Pts: Peñarada 22; Rebs: Bernardino 19; Asts: Bernardino 8
**Batangas leads series, 1–0**

Parañaque Coliseum, Parañaque

July 1
4:00 p.m.

Boxscore

**Batangas New Zealand Bluefire**	**59**–58	Biñan Tatak Gel Angels
Scoring by quarter: **18**–12, 13–**18**, 12–**20**, **16**–8
Pts: Bernardino 15; Rebs: Bernardino 20; Asts: Bernardino, Calang 2		Pts: San Juan 12; Rebs: Abaca 11; Asts: Del Carmen, Domingo 3
**Batangas wins series, 2–0**

Parañaque Coliseum, Parañaque

=== Finals: (1) Akari Sparks Rizal vs. (2) Batangas New Zealand Bluefire ===
July 8
6:00 p.m.

Boxscore

**Akari Sparks Rizal**	**92**–88 (OT)	Batangas New Zealand Bluefire
Scoring by quarter: **26**–16, **22**–16, 14–**26**, 17–**21**, Overtime: **13**–9
Pts: Palmera-Dy 20; Rebs: Lim 9 Asts: Abatayo 9		Pts: Bernardino 23; Rebs: Peñarada 13; Asts: Bernardino 7
**Rizal wins series, 1–0**

Hoops Haven, Pasay

July 12
6:00 p.m.

Boxscore

**Batangas New Zealand Bluefire**	**83**–60	Akari Sparks Rizal
Scoring by quarter: **26**–9, **25**–23, **18**–9, 14–**19**
Pts: Bernardino 24; Rebs: Bernardino 21; Asts: Tongco 7		Pts: Lim 15; Rebs: Lim 11; Asts: Abatayo 6
**Series tied, 1–1**

Paco Arena, Manila

July 15
4:00 p.m.

Boxscore

**Akari Sparks Rizal**	**73**–59	Batangas New Zealand Bluefire
Scoring by quarter: **21**–13, **22**–14, 18–**23**, **12**–9
Pts: Prado 20; Rebs: Prado 11; Asts: Palmera-Dy 9		Pts: Bernardino 16; Rebs: Bernardino 11; Asts: Bernardino 4
**Rizal wins series, 2–1**

Parañaque Coliseum, Parañaque

== Awards ==
=== Individual season awards ===
The league's individual awards were given on July 12, 2026, before game 2 of the finals series at the Paco Arena in Manila. The finals MVP were announced after the game 3 of the finals series.

Award	Recipient	Team
**Most Valuable Player**	Afril Bernardino	Batangas New Zealand Bluefire
**Finals Most Valuable Player**	Allana Lim	Akari Sparks Rizal
**Defensive Player of the Year**	Afril Bernardino	Batangas New Zealand Bluefire
**Rookie of the Year**	Mar Prado	Akari Sparks Rizal
**Most Improved Player**	Lee Sario	Pasig Queenpin

=== Mythical Five ===
Player	Team
Afril Bernardino	Batangas New Zealand Bluefire
Snow Peñaranda	Batangas New Zealand Bluefire
Allana Lim	Akari Sparks Rizal
Monique Del Carmen	Biñan Tatak Gel Angels
Tantoy Ferrer	RK Hoops–Quezon City
