= 2024 PBA Women's 3x3 Invitational =

- League: Women's PBA 3x3
- Season: 2023–24
- Teams: 6

Finals
- Champions: Uratex Dream
- Runners-up: Gilas B
- Semifinalists: Angelis Resort; Philippine Navy

Seasons
- ← 2015–16

The 2024 PBA Women's 3x3 Invitational is a women's 3x3 tournament under the Women's PBA 3x3. Held from January 22 to February 19, it held alongside the Third conference of the men's 2023–24 PBA 3x3 season.

Uratex Dream clinched the title.

== Teams ==
The following are the participating teams and listed players.

Team	Players			
Angelis Resort	Mary Joy Galicia	Allana Lim	Jenina Ann Solis	Alyssa Villamor
Gilas A	Mikka Cacho	Kristine Cayabyab	Katrina Guytingco	Hazelle Yam
Gilas B	Jhazmin Joson	April Peñaranda	Luisa San Juan	April Tano
Philippine Air Force	Kristine Abriam	Fria Bernardo	Abigail Manzanares	Cindy Resultay
Philippine Navy–Go for Gold	Angelo Antiquera	Afril Bernardino	Janelle Mendoza	Andrea Tongco
Uratex Dream	Angelica Anies	Eunique Chan	Samantha Harada	Kaye Pingol

== Venues ==
The venues for the tournament are:

Round robin

- Circuit Makati, Makati – January 22–23
- Market! Market!, Taguig – January 29–30 and February 5–6

Knock-out stage

- Glorietta, Makati – February 19

== Results ==
=== Round robin ===
Pos	Team	Pld	W	L	PF	PA	PD	PCT	SF
1	Philippine Navy	5	4	1	90	77	+13	.800 (Note: Philippine Navy 18–17 Uratex Dream)	Semifinals
2	Uratex Dream	5	4	1	97	84	+13	.800	Semifinals
3	Angelis Resort	5	2	3	88	94	−6	.400 (Note: Angelis Resort 2–0; Gilas B 1–1; Gilas A 0–2)	Semifinals
4	Gilas B	5	2	3	89	85	+4	.400	Semifinals
5	Gilas A	5	2	3	81	77	+4	.400	
6	Philippine Air Force	5	1	4	68	96	−28	.200	

Updated to match(es) played on January 23. Source: PBA 3x3
Rules for classification: 1) Wins; Win ratio if unequal number of games; 2) Head-to-head record; 3) Average points per game; 4) Higher seed.
Notes:

January 22
4:00 pm

Report

Uratex Dream	20–15	Angelis Resort

Circuit Makati

January 22
4:20 pm

Report

Gilas A	14–16	Gilas B

Circuit Makati

January 22
4:40 pm

Report

Philippine Air Force	16–19	Uratex Dream

Circuit Makati

January 22
5:00 pm

Report

Angelis Resort	19–17 (OT)	Gilas A

Circuit Makati

January 23
3:00 pm

Report

Gilas B	16–19	Philippine Navy

Circuit Makati

January 29
4:00 pm

Report

Uratex Dream	21–19	Gilas A

Market! Market!, Taguig

January 29
4:20 pm

Report

Philippine Navy	19–16 (OT)	Angelis Resort

Market! Market!, Taguig

January 29
4:40 pm

Report

Gilas A	16–8	Philippine Air Force

Market! Market!, Taguig

January 29
5:00 pm

Report

Gilas B	16–20	Uratex Dream

Market! Market!, Taguig

January 30
3:00 pm

Report

Philippine Navy	21–13	Philippine Air Force

Market! Market!, Taguig

February 5
4:00 pm

Report

Philippine Air Force	12–22	Gilas B

Market! Market!, Taguig

February 5
4:20 pm

Report

Uratex Dream	17–18	Philippine Navy

Market! Market!, Taguig

February 5
4:40 pm

Report

Gilas B	19–20	Angelis Resort

Market! Market!, Taguig

February 5
5:00 pm

Report

Gilas A	15–13 (OT)	Philippine Navy

Market! Market!, Taguig

February 6
3:00 pm

Report

Angelis Resort	18–19	Philippine Air Force

Market! Market!, Taguig

=== Knock-out stage ===
Semifinals
A1	Philippine Navy	15
A4	Gilas B	19
A2	Uratex Dream	21
A3	Angelis Resort	20

Finals
A4	Gilas B	15
A2	Uratex Dream	22
Third place
A1	Philippine Navy	20
A3	Angelis Resort	21

==== Semifinals ====
February 19
2:00 pm

Report

Philippine Navy	15–19	Gilas B

Glorietta, Makati

February 19
2:20 pm

Report

Uratex Dream	21–20	Angelis Resort

Glorietta, Makati

==== Third place game ====
February 19
2:40 pm

Report

Philippine Navy	20–21	Angelis Resort

Glorietta, Makati

==== Finals ====
February 19
3:00 pm

Report

Gilas B	15–22	Uratex Dream

Glorietta, Makati
