= Basketball at the 2019 SEA Games – Women's tournament =

Women's basketball tournament at the 2019 SEA Games
- Venue: Mall of Asia Arena
- Dates: 4–10 December
- Nations: 4

Medalists
gold medal	Philippines
silver medal	Thailand
bronze medal	Indonesia

The women's basketball tournament at the 2019 SEA Games was held at the Mall of Asia Arena in Pasay, Metro Manila, Philippines from 4 to 10 December.

== Competition schedule ==
The following was the competition schedule for the women's basketball competitions:

RR	Round-robin

Wed 4	Thu 5	Fri 6	Sat 7	Sun 8	Mon 9	Tue 10
RR	RR	RR		RR	RR	RR

== Participating nations ==
- Indonesia
- Malaysia
- Philippines
- Thailand

== Venue ==
The regular 5-on-5 basketball tournament was held at the Mall of Asia Arena in Pasay.

Cuneta Astrodome was also previously considered as a potential venue for 5-on-5 basketball while the SM Mall of Asia Activity Center was considered to host the 3x3 basketball competitions.

Pasay	Basketball at the 2019 SEA Games – Women's tournament (Philippines)
Mall of Asia Arena	Basketball at the 2019 SEA Games – Women's tournament (Philippines)
Capacity: 15,000	Basketball at the 2019 SEA Games – Women's tournament (Philippines)

== Results ==
=== Round robin ===
Pos	Team	Pld	W	L	PF	PA	PD	Pts	Final Result
1	Philippines (H)	3	3	0	235	202	+33	6	Gold medal
2	Thailand	3	2	1	208	196	+12	5	Silver medal
3	Indonesia	3	1	2	184	189	−5	4	Bronze medal
4	Malaysia	3	0	3	181	221	−40	3	

Source: 2019 SEA Games
Rules for classification: (1) Tournament points, (2) Head-to-head tournament points, (3) Head-to-head goal average, (4) Overall goal average, (5) Drawing of lots
(H) Hosts

All times are Philippine Standard Time (UTC+8)

4 December 2019
18:00

Report

Malaysia	47–70	Thailand
Scoring by quarter: 8–18, 15–15, 16–14, 8–23
Pts: Tan 14; Rebs: Yap 9 Asts: Saw 6		Pts: Bias 24; Rebs: Kaichaiyapoom 10; Asts: Bias 7

Mall of Asia Arena, Pasay
Referees: Kumiko Kumagai (JPN), Tien Hsiao-lun (TPE), Ricor Buaron (PHI)

5 December 2019
18:00

Report

Philippines	63–56	Indonesia
Scoring by quarter: 15–15, 16–19, 16–11, 16–11
Pts: Pontejos 16; Rebs: Animam 12; Asts: Bernardino, Cabinbin 5		Pts: Anggraeni 16; Rebs: Sophia 10; Asts: Retong, Sutjiono 4

Mall of Asia Arena, Pasay
Referees: Tien Hsiao-lun (TPE), Kumiko Kumagai (JPN), Suebpong Wichaiphin (THA)

6 December 2019
18:00

Report

Thailand	67–58	Indonesia
Scoring by quarter: 13–17, 18–14, 20–18, 16–9
Pts: Bias, Kaichaiyapoom 13; Rebs: Bias, Klunbut, Kaichaiyapoom 6 Asts: Bias 9		Pts: Sophia 15; Rebs: Sophia 13; Asts: Retong 7

Mall of Asia Arena, Pasay
Referees: Chang Lu-yueh (TPE), Kumiko Kumagai (JPN), Triệu Chí Thành (VIE)

8 December 2019
18:00

Report

Malaysia	75–81	Philippines
Scoring by quarter: 14–16, 24–26, 23–22, 12–17
Pts: Yap 18; Rebs: Hiew 12; Asts: Low 6		Pts: Bernardino 18; Rebs: Bernardino 19; Asts: Cabinbin 5

Mall of Asia Arena, Pasay
Referees: Chang Lu-yueh (TPE), Tien Hsiao-lun (TPE), Linn Maung (MYA)

9 December 2019
18:00

Report

Indonesia	70–59	Malaysia
Scoring by quarter: 17–27, 21–6, 18–16, 14–10
Pts: Sophia 17; Rebs: Sophia 17; Asts: Wongsohardjo 4		Pts: Yap 15; Rebs: Rajintiran 8 Asts: Ting 4

Mall of Asia Arena, Pasay
Referees: Kumiko Kumagai (JPN), Tien Hsiao-lun (TPE), Triệu Chí Thành (VIE)

10 December 2019
18:00

Report

Philippines	91–71	Thailand
Scoring by quarter: 27–20, 18–23, 23–9, 23–19
Pts: Animam 21; Rebs: Bernardino 14; Asts: Bernardino 5		Pts: Bias 15; Rebs: Kaichaiyapoom 10; Asts: Bias 4

Mall of Asia Arena, Pasay
Referees: Kumiko Kumagai (JPN), Wong Sing Hui (SIN), Yuli Wulandari (INA)

== Final standings ==
Rank	Team
1st place, gold medalist(s)	Philippines
2nd place, silver medalist(s)	Thailand
3rd place, bronze medalist(s)	Indonesia
4	Malaysia

== See also ==
- Men's tournament
