= Uratex Dream =

- Leagues: Women's PBA 3x3
- Founded: 2021
- Team colors: Blue, White, Black
- Company: Uratex Philippines
- Head coach: Katrina Quimpo
- Championships: 4 titles: 2021–22 WNBL Leg 1; 2021–22 WNBL Leg 2; 2021–22 WNBL Leg 4; 2024 WPBA Invitational

Uratex Dream is a Philippine women's 3x3 basketball team which competes in the Women's PBA 3x3. The team is affiliated with bed mattress firm Uratex Philippines.

== History ==
When Haydee Ong was named as commissioner of the 3x3 Women's National Basketball League (WNBL), Ong invited Peachy Medina, her former teammate in the Philippines youth national basketball team, to form a 3x3 team for the league amidst the COVID-19 pandemic.

Uratex Philippines, the company which Medina is affiliated with, would send two team in the inaugural 2021–22 season; Dream and Tibay. Uratex Dream clinched the inaugural leg title. They would went on to win the second and fourth legs but concede the third one to the Taguig Lady Generals.

Uratex Dream would compete in various international tournaments such as the ASEAN Basketball League (ABL) 3x3, the Asia Tour 3x3 and the Manila Hustle 3x3.

They would qualify for and play in the 2023 Red Bull Half Court tournament in Serbia. They finished as quarterfinalists, after losing to a team from Australia.

They are among the six teams to feature in the 2024 invitational tournament of the Women's PBA 3x3. The team, coached by Katrina Quimpo, was able to clinch the title.

Uratex Dream has been credited for the Philippine national team's qualification for the 2024 FIBA 3×3 Women's Series.

== Current roster ==
Uratex Dream roster
Players
Coaches

Pos.	No.	Nat.	Name	Ht.	Wt.	Age
		(Philippines)	Pingol, Kaye	1.67 m (5 ft 6 in)
		(Philippines)	Harada, Sam
		(Philippines)	Chan, Eunique
		(Philippines)	Anies, Shanda
		(Philippines)	Junsay, Cecilia
		(Philippines)	Siat, April
		(China)	Li Renzhu	1.80 m (5 ft 11 in)

Head coach

N/A

Legend

- (C) Team captain
- Injured

- Roster
