= Patrick Aquino =

Filipino basketball player and coach

Blackwater Bossing
- Position: Head coach
- League: PBA

Personal information
- Born: May 30, 1971 (age 55)
- Listed height: 6 ft 2 in (1.88 m)

Career information
- College: UP

Career history

Playing
- -: Blu Detergent

Coaching
- 1998–1999, 2008: Ever Bilena
- 2012–2022: NU (women)
- -: Philippines U19 (women)
- 2014–2026: Philippines (women)
- 2014–2019, 2022–2026: Blackwater Elite / Blackwater Bossing (assistant)
- 2016: Blackwater Elite (women's 3x3)
- 2026–present: Blackwater Bossing (interim)

Career highlights
- 6× UAAP women's champion (2014–2019); 3x WPBL champion (1998, 1998, 2008)
Medals
Women's basketball
Head coach for Philippines
SEA Games
Gold medal – first place	2019 Philippines	Team
Gold medal – first place	2021 Hanoi	Team
Silver medal – second place	2023 Phnom Penh	Team
Gold medal – first place	2025 Bangkok	Team

Patrick Henry Aquino (born May 30, 1971) is a Filipino basketball coach who served as the head coach of the Philippines women's national basketball team, he has been appointed by the Samahang Basketbol ng Pilipinas since December 2014 when the team have a new corporate backer Ever Bilena, replacing long-time mentor Haydee Ong. This is the second time that Aquino has coached a national team, Aquino once coached for the Philippines women's national under-19 basketball team. Among his coaching achievements for promoted into Level 1 of 2017 FIBA Asia Women's Championship.

== Playing career ==
Aquino spent his collegiate basketball career for the UP Fighting Maroons in the UAAP from 1988 to 1993 under coach Rey Madrid and also played for the Blu Detergent team in the Philippine Basketball League (PBL). He also tried out for a team in the Metropolitan Basketball Association but was not signed.

== Coaching career ==
Aside from his playing stint with Ever Bilena on the men's side, Aquino also coached the Ever Bilena women's team that bring home the grand slam victories in the now-defunct Women's Philippine Basketball League (WPBL) in 1998 and 1999. He coached the team again when the WPBL was briefly revived in 2008, also winning the championship.

He has also coached the NU Lady Bulldogs in the University Athletic Association of the Philippines (UAAP) from 2012 to 2022. The team won six straight titles under his mentorship.

Aquino then became the head coach of the Philippines women's national basketball team, appointed by the Samahang Basketbol ng Pilipinas This is the second time that Aquino has coached a national team, Aquino once coached for the Philippines women's national under-19 basketball team. Among his coaching achievements for promoted into Level 1 of 2017 FIBA Asia Women's Championship.

Aquino led the team to three SEA Games gold medal in 2019, 2022, 2025.After leading the senior team in the 2026 FIBA Women's Basketball World Cup Qualifying Tournament, Aquino relieved from the role in March.

The senior Philippine team reached its highest ever FIBA ranking at 30th. The Philippine women's teams including the youth sides have been elevated to Division A in the Asian tournaments under Aquino's tenure.

== Coaching record ==
=== Collegiate record ===
Season	Team	Elimination round					Playoffs				
Season	Team	Finish	GP	W	L	PCT	GP	W	L	PCT	Results
2012	NU	5th/8	14	7	7	.500	1	0	1	.000	4th seed playoff
2013	NU	1st/8	14	12	2	.857	5	2	3	.400	Finals
2014	NU	1st/8	14	14	0	1.000	2	2	0	1.000	Champion
2015	NU	1st/8	14	14	0	1.000	2	2	0	1.000	Champion
2016	NU	1st/8	14	14	0	1.000	2	2	0	1.000	Champion
2017	NU	1st/8	14	14	0	1.000	2	2	0	1.000	Champion
2018	NU	1st/8	14	14	0	1.000	2	2	0	1.000	Champion
2019	NU	1st/8	14	14	0	1.000	2	2	0	1.000	Champion
2020	NU	Season cancelled									
2021	NU	Season cancelled									
Totals			112	103	9	.920	18	14	4	.778	6× champion

=== National team record ===
Tournament	Team	Preliminary round					Final round				
Tournament	Team	Finish	GP	W	L	PCT	GP	W	L	PCT	Results
2015 SEA Games	Philippines	4th/6	5	3	2	.600	No playoffs				4th place
2016 SEABA Championship for Women	Philippines	1st/7	6	6	0	1.000	No playoffs				(gold) Gold medal
2017 FIBA Women's Asia Cup	Philippines	4th/4	3	0	3	.000	3	1	2	.333	7th place
2017 SEA Games	Philippines	4th/7	6	4	2	.667	No playoffs				4th place
2019 William Jones Cup	Philippines	6th/6	5	0	5	.000	No playoffs				6th place
2019 FIBA Women's Asia Cup	Philippines	4th/4	3	0	3	.000	1	1	0	1.000	7th place
2020 Summer Olympics Asia/Oceania pre-qualifying tournaments	Philippines	4th/4	3	0	3	.000	No playoffs				Joint 7th place
2019 SEA Games	Philippines	1st/4	3	3	0	1.000	No playoffs				(gold) Gold medal
2021 SEA Games	Philippines	1st/6	5	4	1	.800	No playoffs				(gold) Gold medal
2021 FIBA Women's Asia Cup	Philippines	4th/4	3	0	3	.000	1	1	0	1.000	7th place
2022 Asian Games	Philippines	2nd/4	3	2	1	.667	1	0	1	.000	5th place
2023 SEA Games	Philippines	2nd/7	6	5	1	.833	No playoffs				(silver) Silver medal
2023 FIBA Women's Asia Cup	Philippines	3rd/4	3	1	2	.333	2	0	2	.000	5th place
2023 William Jones Cup	Philippines	5th/6	5	1	4	.200	No playoffs				5th place
2024 William Jones Cup	Philippines	4th/6	5	2	3	.400	No playoffs				4th place
2026 FIBA Women's Basketball World Cup Pre-Qualifying Tournaments	Philippines	4th/4	3	0	3	.000	—	—	—	—	8th place
Total			67	31	36	.463	8	3	5	.375	3 gold medals

Preceded by Haydee Ong	Philippines women's national basketball team head coach 2015–present	Succeeded by incumbent
