= Elizabeth Means =

American-Filipino basketball player (born 2002)

Pilipinas Aguilas
- League: FIBA 3x3 Pro Circuit

Personal information
- Born: October 31, 2002 (age 24) Thousand Oaks, California, U.S.

Career information
- College: Seattle Pacific; Westminster (Utah)
- Playing career: 2025–present

Career history
- 2025: A Encestar
- 2026: Pilipinas Aguilas (3x3)

Elizabeth Jeanette Means (born October 31, 2002) is an American-Filipino basketball player.

== Early life and education ==
Elizabeth Jeanette Pettingill was born on October 31, 2002, in Thousand Oaks, California and was raised in Folsom. She has seven siblings. She took up basketball at age six and was homeschooled until age 13. She enrolled at Folsom High School. The Pettingills are into basketball and with Elizabeth's height, members of the family expected her to commit to basketball or play volleyball. She attended Seattle Pacific University in Washington where she played basketball for two years. She married Connor Means in 2022, and transferred to Westminster University in Utah. Elizabeth and Connor later divorced in 2026.

== Career ==
=== College ===
Means played for the Seattle Pacific Falcons in the NCAA Division II from 2020 to 2022.

Means played for the Westminster Griffins in the NCAA Division II from 2022 to 2024. She took a break after she graduated from college.

=== Club ===
Means made her professional debut for A Encestar in Ecuador at the Ecuadorian Liga Femina 2025.

=== 3x3 basketball ===
Means has played for the 3x3 basketball team of the Pilipinas Aguilas. The team finished 11th at the 2026 Manila Hustle 3x3 in February, before winning the 2026 3x3 BITL in Bangkok, Thailand in March.

=== National team ===
Means is part of the Philippines national 5x5 basketball team that played in the 2026 Asian Games in Japan.

== Personal life ==
Means has Filipino citizenship through naturalization via legislation in the Philippine Congress. She has roots though in the Philippines through her grandfather who was born in Naga, Camarines Sur.

She was encouraged to obtain Filipino citizenship, by 3x3 coach Anton Altamirano with the naturalization process beginning as early as 2025. She obtained citizenship when Republic Act No. 12319 lapsed into law on May 18, 2026. Means took her oath of allegiance and acquired her Philippine passport by July 1, 2026.
