= Pilipinas Aguilas =

Basketball team in the Philippines

- League: Men's team: FilBasket / AsiaBasket (2022–2023); PSL (2024–2025); Women's team: WMPBL (2025)
- Founded: 2022; 4 years ago
- Head coach: Paul Layug
- Championships: WMPBL: 1 (2025 Invitational)

The Pilipinas Aguilas are a basketball team in the Philippines. The Aguilas have two teams, one for both men and women.

The men's team was established in 2022 and initially competed in FilBasket / AsiaBasket until 2023. In 2024, the team entered the Pilipinas Super League (PSL) as the Pilipinas Navy Aguilas.

The women's team was established in 2025, where they competed in the 2025 WMPBL Invitational Tournament.

== History ==
The Pilipinas Aguilas was founded by lawyer, Luis de la Paz.

=== Men's team ===
The Pilipinas Aguilas first played in FilBasket / AsiaBasket for its 2022 International Championship. In the group stage, Aguilas finished second in group A, only losing to Harimau Malaysia to advance to the knockout stage. They would then go on to lose to Kuala Lumpur Aseel in the semifinals but did beat the MBC Basketball Club to win a bronze medal. The Aguilas took part in two more tournaments afterward, the 2023 Las Piñas Championship where they placed last in Group B, and the 2023 Dasmariñas Championship where they lost to the Benilde Blazers in the quarterfinals.

=== Women's team ===
In 2025, Pilipinas Aguilas' women's team joined the Women's Maharlika Pilipinas Basketball League (WMPBL). This is the fourth ever squad and the first women's side, formed under the Pilipinas Aguilas banner. Under head coach Paul Layug and the guidance of Eric Altamirano, the Aguilas won the 2025 Invitational Tournament.

==== 3x3 team ====
The Aguilas has a women's 3x3 basketball team. In 2026, they won the 3x3 Basketball Thailand International League in Bangkok.

== Notable players ==
Women

- France Cabinbin (2025 Invitational; team captain)
- Lexi Pana (2025 Invitational)
- Elizabeth Means (2026; 3x3 basketball)

== Honors ==
Men

- FilBasket

Third place (1): 2022 International

Women

- Women's Maharlika Pilipinas Basketball League

Champions (1): 2025 Invitational

== Season-by-season records ==
| League champions |
| Qualified for playoffs / knockout stage |
| Best record in group |

=== Men's team ===
==== FilBasket / AsiaBasket ====
| Tournament | Group stage | | | | | | | Knockout stage | |
| Tournament | Group | Finish | GP | W | L | PCT | GB | Stage | Results |
|---|---|---|---|---|---|---|---|---|---|
Pilipinas Aguilas
| International 2022 | Group A | 2nd | 4 | 3 | 1 | .750 | 1 | Semifinals; Battle for third | lost vs. Kuala Lumpur, 63–72 won vs. MBC, 81–72 |
| Las Piñas 2023 | Group B | 5th | 4 | 1 | 3 | .250 | 3 | Did not qualify | |
| Dasmariñas 2023 | Group A | 4th | 4 | 2 | 2 | .500 | 1 | Quarterfinals | lost vs. Benilde, 43–90 |
| All-time group stage record | | | 12 | 6 | 6 | .500 | | 2 knockout stage appearances | |
| All-time knockout stage record | | | 3 | 1 | 2 | .333 | | 0 finals appearances | |
| All-time league record | | | 15 | 7 | 8 | .467 | | 0 championships | |
