= 2023 AsiaBasket Dasmariñas Championship =

Sixth tournament of FilBasket / AsiaBasket; third in 2023

Tournament details
- Country: Philippines
- Dates: November 3–11, 2023
- Teams: 10

Final positions
- Champions: (Philippines) CSB Blazers
- Runners-up: (United States) Statham Academy
- Third place: (Philippines) MisOr Mustangs
- Fourth place: (Philippines) Shawarma Shack Pilipinas

The 2023 AsiaBasket Dasmariñas Championship was the sixth tournament under AsiaBasket, the third under the AsiaBasket name, and the last of three tournaments held in 2023. The tournament ran from November 3–11, 2023 at Dasmariñas Arena in Dasmariñas, Cavite, with collegiate and professional teams from various countries.

The tournament was won by the CSB Blazers after defeating Statham Academy in the championship game, 105–86.

== Entertainment ==
Filipino pop rock bands Mayonnaise and Nobita, and rapper Al James will become a guest performance a day after the championship game sponsored by Circus Music Festival.

== Teams ==
Name	Locality	Country	Head coach
CSB Blazers	Malate, Manila	Philippines	Rajko Toroman
Corsa Tires	—N/a	Philippines	Monch Gavieres
Dasmariñas Monarchs	Dasmariñas, Cavite	Philippines	Azlie Guro
Makati Circus Music Festival	Makati	Philippines	Bryan Beran
MisOr Mustangs	Misamis Oriental	Philippines	JR Cawaling
PCU Dolphins – Dasmariñas (Note: Defending champion Ateneo Blue Eagles was initially announced to compete but was replaced by PCU Dolphins due to collegiate commitments.)	Dasmariñas, Cavite	Philippines	Johnny Belandrez
Phuket Waves	Phuket	Thailand	Jason Santiago
Pilipinas Aguilas	—N/a	Philippines	Paolo Layug
Statham Academy	California	United States	
Shawarma Shack Pilipinas	—N/a	Philippines	Cezar Mabasa

== Format ==
The ten teams are divided into two groups of five, from there each team plays one game against all other teams from the same group, with each team playing four games.

The top four teams from each group will then advance to the single-elimination knockout stage. The first round is a crossover quarterfinals, where one team from both groups is matched against one another. The winning teams advance to the next round. In the Semifinals, the losing teams advance to a third place game.

== Group stage ==
=== Group A ===
Pos	Team	Pld	W	L	PF	PA	PD	PCT	Qualification	STA	MSO	MKT	PIL	PCU
1	Statham Academy	4	3	1	410	342	+68	.750 (Note: Statham Academy wins tiebreaker over MisOr by head-to-head victory.)	Quarterfinals	—	117–96	109–84	96–72	88–90
2	MisOr Mustangs	4	3	1	382	373	+9	.750	Quarterfinals	96–117	—	102–94	90–75	94–87
3	Makati Circus Music Festival	4	2	2	370	381	−11	.500 (Note: Makati wins tiebreaker over Pilipinas by head-to-head victory.)	Quarterfinals	84–109	94–102	—	93–79	99–91
4	Pilipinas Aguilas	4	2	2	344	338	+6	.500	Quarterfinals	90–88	75–90	79–93	—	100–67
5	PCU Dolphins – Dasmariñas	4	0	4	317	389	−72	.000		72–96	87–94	91–99	67–100	—

Source: Filbasket (via Genius Sports)
Rules for classification: 1) Win percentage; 2) Head-to-head record; 3) Head-to-head point differential; 4) Head-to-head points scored; 5) Overall point differential; 6) Overall points scored.
Notes:

November 3	Pilipinas Aguilas (Philippines)	79–93	(Philippines) Makati Circus Music Festival
1:00 pm	Scoring by quarter: 26–28, 19–26, 10–15, 24–24
	Pts: Dela Cruz 17; Rebs: Eze 12; Asts: Arafat, Baliquig 5	Boxscore	Pts: Formento 28; Rebs: Cadot 15; Asts: Cadot 6

November 3	MisOr Mustangs (Philippines)	96–117	(United States) Statham Academy
5:00 pm	Scoring by quarter: 21–34, 25–30, 19–39, 31–14
	Pts: Toba 25; Rebs: Toba 21; Asts: Lucero 5	Boxscore	Pts: Statham 40; Rebs: Statham 24; Asts: Divita 9

November 4	Makati Circus Music Festival (Philippines)	94–102	(Philippines) MisOr Mustangs
3:00 pm	Scoring by quarter: 26–26, 16–28, 29–21, 23–27
	Pts: Cadot 33; Rebs: Cadot 23; Asts: Lloren, Formento 5	Boxscore	Pts: Doromal 24; Rebs: Cailibaly 17; Asts: Lucero 16

November 4	Statham Academy (United States)	96–72	(Philippines) PCU Dolphins
5:00 pm	Scoring by quarter: 22–16, 25–21, 18–10, 31–25
	Pts: Statham 29; Rebs: Statham 14; Asts: Davis 8	Boxscore	Pts: Dino 17; Rebs: Dino 9 Asts: Dino 7

November 5	MisOr Mustangs (Philippines)	90–75	(Philippines) Pilipinas Aguilas
1:00 pm	Scoring by quarter: 21–31, 19–14, 25–15, 25–15
	Pts: Toba 20; Rebs: Toba 14; Asts: Lucero 16	Boxscore	Pts: dela Cruz 17; Rebs: Eze 13; Asts: Elorde 7

November 5	PCU Dolphins (Philippines)	91–99	(Philippines) Makati Circus Music Festival
3:00 pm	Scoring by quarter: 27–25, 25–30, 18–19, 21–25
	Pts: Escultor 17; Rebs: Tita 11; Asts: Morillo 8	Boxscore	Pts: Cadot 27; Rebs: Cadot 20; Asts: Cadot 5

November 6	Statham Academy (United States)	88–90	(Philippines) Pilipinas Aguilas
3:00 pm	Scoring by quarter: 17–20, 29–24, 26–26, 16–20
	Pts: Statham 22; Rebs: Funchess 12; Asts: Statham 8	Boxscore	Pts: Arafat 19; Rebs: Eze 14; Asts: Daez, Arafat 5

November 6	PCU Dolphins (Philippines)	87–94	(Philippines) MisOr Mustangs
5:00 pm	Scoring by quarter: 27–22, 15–22, 24–19, 21–31
	Pts: Reves 17; Rebs: Morillo, Escultor 7 Asts: Morillo 8	Boxscore	Pts: Toba 28; Rebs: Toba 17; Asts: Doromal 5

November 8	Makati Circus Music Festival (Philippines)	84–109	(United States) Statham Academy
1:00 pm	Scoring by quarter: 29–23, 14–28, 22–27, 19–31
	Pts: Cadot, Formento 18; Rebs: Cadot 13; Asts: Espiritu, Saliente 5	Boxscore	Pts: Statham 23; Rebs: Statham 12; Asts: Davis 11

November 8	Pilipinas Aguilas (Philippines)	100–67	(Philippines) PCU Dolphins
5:00 pm	Scoring by quarter: 28–18, 25–19, 31–9, 16–21
	Pts: Partosa 25; Rebs: Eze 8 Asts: Olegario 4	Boxscore	Pts: Reves 24; Rebs: Reves 13; Asts: Morillo, Reyes 2

=== Group B ===
Pos	Team	Pld	W	L	PF	PA	PD	PCT	Qualification	CSB	SHS	COR	DAS	PKT
1	Benilde Blazers	4	4	0	363	291	+72	1.000	Quarterfinals	—	105–71	97–74	75–68	86–78
2	Shawarma Shack Pilipinas	4	2	2	318	359	−41	.500 (Note: Shawarma Shack wins tiebreaker over Corsa Tires by head-to-head victory.)	Quarterfinals	71–105	—	84–78	83–75	80–101
3	Corsa Tires	4	2	2	335	354	−19	.500	Quarterfinals	74–97	78–84	—	85–78	98–95
4	Dasmariñas Monarchs	4	1	3	304	323	−19	.250 (Note: Dasmariñas wins tiebreaker over Phuket by head-to-head victory.)	Quarterfinals	68–75	75–83	78–85	—	83–80
5	Phuket Waves	4	1	3	354	347	+7	.250		78–86	101–80	95–98	80–83	—

Source: Filbasket (via Genius Sports)
Rules for classification: 1) Win percentage; 2) Head-to-head record; 3) Head-to-head point differential; 4) Head-to-head points scored; 5) Overall point differential; 6) Overall points scored.
Notes:

November 3	Shawarma Shack Pilipinas (Philippines)	84–78	(Philippines) Corsa Tires
3:00 pm	Scoring by quarter: 20–17, 23–30, 25–22–, 16–9
	Pts: Matillano 26; Rebs: Menguez 11; Asts: Montilla 5	Boxscore	Pts: Anderson, Garcia 16; Rebs: Gimpayan 9 Asts: Anderson 5

November 3	CSB Blazers (Philippines)	75–68	(Philippines) Dasmariñas Monarchs
7:00 pm	Scoring by quarter: 19–14, 27–18, 10–19, 19–17
	Pts: Ynot 19; Rebs: Onoula 10; Asts: Ancheta, Ynot 4	Boxscore	Pts: Johnson 26; Rebs: Harry 11; Asts: Vitug, Brill 2

November 4	Corsa Tires (Philippines)	98–95	(Thailand) Phuket Waves
1:00 pm	Scoring by quarter: 18–27, 31–23, 29–22, 20–23
	Pts: Gimpayan 21; Rebs: Gimpayan 7 Asts: Anderson 8	Boxscore	Pts: Williams 22; Rebs: Miller 17; Asts: Martinez 16

November 4	Dasmariñas Monarchs (Philippines)	75–83	(Philippines) Shawarma Shack Pilipinas
7:00 pm	Scoring by quarter: 19–26, 17–21, 20–13, 19–23
	Pts: Catimbuhan 19; Rebs: Onde 12; Asts: three players 3	Boxscore	Pts: Matillano 18; Rebs: Ikeh 13; Asts: Ibanez 7

November 5	Shawarma Shack Pilipinas (Philippines)	71–105	(Philippines) CSB Blazers
5:00 pm	Scoring by quarter: 20–26, 13–29, 19–25, 19–25
	Pts: Castro 20; Rebs: Akpuru 6 Asts: Ikeh, Camacho 3	Boxscore	Pts: Ynot 25; Rebs: Liwag 10; Asts: Torres 6

November 5	Phuket Waves (Thailand)	80–83	(Philippines) Dasmariñas Monarchs
7:00 pm	Scoring by quarter: 27–21, 19–13, 23–27, 11–22
	Pts: Williams 25; Rebs: Miller 14; Asts: Williams, Miller 5	Boxscore	Pts: Johnson 23; Rebs: Laminou 9 Asts: Catimbuhan 7

November 6	Phuket Waves (Thailand)	101–80	(Philippines) Shawarma Shack Pilipinas
1:00 pm	Scoring by quarter: 30–23, 24–16, 28–13, 19–28
	Pts: Williams 23; Rebs: Miller 19; Asts: Martinez 11	Boxscore	Pts: Matillano 17; Rebs: Montilla 8 Asts: Montilla 9

November 6	Corsa Tires (Philippines)	74–97	(Philippines) CSB Blazers
7:00 pm	Scoring by quarter: 19–28, 16–24, 21–21, 18–24
	Pts: Anderson 20; Rebs: Gimpayan 11; Asts: Anderson 6	Boxscore	Pts: Ancheta 21; Rebs: Ojoula 8 Asts: Ynot 5

November 8	CSB Blazers (Philippines)	86–78	(Thailand) Phuket Waves
3:00 pm	Scoring by quarter: 22–20, 22–14, 21–14, 21–20
	Pts: Ojoula, Ynot 18; Rebs: Ojoula 15; Asts: Ancheta 5	Boxscore	Pts: Williams 27; Rebs: Wong, Miller 8 Asts: Martinez 11

November 8	Dasmariñas Monarchs (Philippines)	78–85	(Philippines) Corsa Tires
7:00 pm	Scoring by quarter: 14–28, 22–20, 26–16, 16–21
	Pts: Johnson 32; Rebs: Laminou 14; Asts: Catimbuhan 5	Boxscore	Pts: Gimpayan 26; Rebs: Gimpayan 10; Asts: Tan 5

== Knockout stage ==
The top four teams from the group stage advanced to the quarterfinals. The winners advanced to a semifinal. The winners advanced to a one-game final while the losers contested in the third-place play-off game.

Quarterfinals
A1	(United States) Statham	101
B4	(Philippines) Dasmariñas	84
B2	(Philippines) Shawarma Shack	102
A3	(Philippines) Makati	98
B1	(Philippines) CSB	90
A4	(Philippines) Aguilas	43
A2	(Philippines) MisOr	87
B3	(Philippines) Corsa	72

Semifinals
A1	(United States) Statham	89
B2	(Philippines) Shawarma Shack	81
B1	(Philippines) CSB	103
A2	(Philippines) MisOr	86

Finals
A1	(United States) Statham	84
B1	(Philippines) CSB	105
Third place
B2	(Philippines) Shawarma Shack	104
A2	(Philippines) MisOr	106

=== Quarterfinals ===
November 9	CSB Blazers (Philippines)	90–43	(Philippines) Pilipinas Aguilas
1:00 p.m.	Scoring by quarter: 30–5, 25–21, 26–9, 9–8
	Pts: Liwag 16; Rebs: Ojoula 15; Asts: Torres, Ynot 5	Boxscore	Pts: dela Cruz 16; Rebs: Eze 10; Asts: Arafat 4

November 9	Shawarma Shack Pilipinas (Philippines)	102–98	(Philippines) Makati Circus Music Festival
3:00 p.m.	Scoring by quarter: 30–23, 31–24, 17–32, 24–19
	Pts: Matillano 26; Rebs: Matillano, Alano 8 Asts: Montilla 11	Boxscore	Pts: Cadot 32; Rebs: Cadot 16; Asts: Formento 6

November 9	Corsa Tires (Philippines)	72–87	(Philippines) MisOr Mustangs
5:00 p.m.	Scoring by quarter: 18–20, 21–21, 14–18, 19–28
	Pts: Anderson 20; Rebs: Gimpayan 14; Asts: Anderson, Tan 4	Boxscore	Pts: Doromal 18; Rebs: Cailibaly 14; Asts: Lucero 10

November 9	Statham Academy (United States)	101–84	(Philippines) Dasmariñas Monarchs
7:00 p.m.	Scoring by quarter: 30–19, 21–18, 26–23, 24–24
	Pts: Statham, Guzman 27; Rebs: Guzman 12; Asts: Davis 14	Boxscore	Pts: Laminou 26; Rebs: Laminou 13; Asts: Johnson 5

=== Semifinals ===
November 10	Statham Academy (United States)	89–81	(Philippines) Shawarma Shack Pilipinas
5:00 pm	Scoring by quarter: 24–27, 23–20, 14–17, 28–17
	Pts: Statham 21; Rebs: Statham 12; Asts: Davis 12	Boxscore	Pts: Ibanez 18; Rebs: Alano 7 Asts: Gabawan 6

November 10	MisOr Mustangs (Philippines)	86–103	(Philippines) CSB Blazers
7:00 pm	Scoring by quarter: 27–11, 24–30, 16–34, 19–28
	Pts: Toba 24; Rebs: Cailibaly 12; Asts: Lucero 9	Boxscore	Pts: Ynot 21; Rebs: Ojoula 18; Asts: Ynot 6

=== Third place game ===
November 11	Shawarma Shack Pilipinas (Philippines)	104–106	(Philippines) MisOr Mustangs
5:00 pm	Scoring by quarter: 23–29, 33–20, 31–28, 17–29
	Pts: Matillano 24; Rebs: Gabawan 18; Asts: Montilla 13	Boxscore	Pts: Sombero 26; Rebs: Sombero 15; Asts: Doromal, Gonzales 6

=== Finals ===
November 11	Statham Academy (United States)	86–105	(Philippines) CSB Blazers
7:30 pm	Scoring by quarter: 16–25, 17–37, 19–21, 32–22
	Pts: Guzman 24; Rebs: Guzman 9 Asts: Statham 9	Boxscore	Pts: Ynot 23; Rebs: Ojoula 11; Asts: Cometa 5

== Statistics ==
=== Individual statistical leaders ===
Category	Player	Team	Statistic
Points per game	Taylor Statham	(United States) Statham Academy	24.6
Rebounds per game	JR Cadot	(Philippines) Makati Circus Music Festival	17.4
Assists per game	James Martinez	(Thailand) Phuket Waves	10.5
Steals per game	Nino Ibanez	(Philippines) Shawarma Shack Pilipinas	2.6
Blocks per game	Lass Cailibaly	(Philippines) MisOr Mustangs	3.4
FG%	Jonathan Guzman	(United States) Statham Academy	68.5%
FT%	Franky Johnson	(Philippines) Dasmariñas Monarchs	85.0%
3FG%	Ethan Chung	(United States) Statham Academy	53.3%

=== Team statistical leaders ===
Category	Team	Statistic
Points per game	(United States) Statham Academy	97.7
Rebounds per game	(Thailand) Phuket Waves	54.3
Assists per game	(Thailand) Phuket Waves	33.0
Steals per game	(Philippines) CSB Blazers	11.0
Blocks per game	(Philippines) MisOr Mustangs	6.0
Turnovers per game	(Philippines) PCU Dolphins (Thailand) Phuket Waves	19.0

== Awards ==
The individual league awards was given before the Finals of the 2023 AsiaBasket Dasmariñas Championship at the Dasmariñas Arena in Dasmariñas, Cavite.

Awards	Winner (s)	Team
Most Valuable Player	Tony Ynot	(Philippines) CSB Blazers
Finals MVP	Tony Ynot	(Philippines) CSB Blazers
All-AsiaBasket First Team	Taylor Statham	(United States) Statham Academy
All-AsiaBasket First Team	Jonathan Guzman	(United States) Statham Academy
All-AsiaBasket First Team	Tony Ynot	(Philippines) CSB Blazers
All-AsiaBasket First Team	Domark Matillano	(Philippines) Shawarma Shack Pilipinas
All-AsiaBasket First Team	Eugene Toba	(Philippines) MisOr Mustangs
All-AsiaBasket Second Team	Gerald Anderson	(Philippines) Corsa Tires
All-AsiaBasket Second Team	Jaymar Gimpayan	(Philippines) Corsa Tires
All-AsiaBasket Second Team	Franky Johnson	(Philippines) Dasmariñas Monarchs
All-AsiaBasket Second Team	Jan Formento	(Philippines) Makati Circus Music Festival
All-AsiaBasket Second Team	JR Cadot	(Philippines) Makati Circus Music Festival
Coach of the Tournament	Rajko Toroman	(Philippines) CSB Blazers
