= Haydee Ong =

Filipino basketball player and coach

UST Growling Tigresses
- Position: Head coach
- League: UAAP

Personal information
- Born: April 19, 1970 (age 56)

Career information
- College: UST

Career history

Coaching
- –: Ateneo
- –: Enderun
- 2008–2014: Philippines (women's)
- 2016–present: UST

Career highlights
- UAAP women's champion (2023, 2025)

Haydee Ong (born April 19, 1970) is a Filipino basketball coach and former player who is the head coach of the UST Growling Tigresses women's basketball team. She was the head coach of the Philippines women's national basketball team from 2008 to 2014. From 2024 to 2026, she served as the inaugural commissioner of the Women's Maharlika Pilipinas Basketball League (WMPBL).

== Early life and education ==
Haydee Ong was inspired to play basketball from his father who was a varsity player while her mother initially opposed to the idea of her doing something that is considered as a "men's sport". She attended Chiang Kai-shek College for her high school education.

Ong later attended the University of Santo Tomas for her collegiate studies under an athletic scholarship. After graduating, she worked as a pharmacist for two years before getting involved in basketball again.

== Competitive career ==
As a player for the University of Santo Tomas from 1988 to 1991, Haydee Ong helped her college win four straight championships at the UAAP. She was named Most Valuable Player in 1991.

Ong also played for the Philippine women's under-18 national team in 1987 and 1989. She was part of the senior national team in 1993.

== Coaching career ==
=== National team ===
Ong joined the coaching staff of the Philippine women's national team in 1996 and was appointed as head coach of the national team in 2008, replacing Fritz Gatson. The national team under her mentorship also participated in the defunct Women's Philippine Basketball League.

The national team won its first gold medal in a regional tournament at the 2010 SEABA Championship for Women under Ong's watch. The national team also won silver at the 2011 and 2013 Southeast Asian Games.

Her national team coaching stint ended in 2014. Patrick Aquino succeeded her as coach of the national team in 2015.

=== Collegiate ===
Ong has coached the Ateneo Lady Eagles of the UAAP for seven years.

She coaches the women's varsity team of Enderun Colleges. She led Enderun on their first National Athletic Association of Schools, Colleges and Universities (NAASCU) stint in 2016 where they managed to become champions by beating Rizal Technological University in their final game. Ong was also named as Coach of the Year for the 2016 season.

In 2016, Ong began coaching the women's team of her alma mater, the University of Santo Tomas at UAAP Season 79.

The UST Tigresses under Ong ended the NU Lady Bulldogs's championship streak in 2023, in the finals of Season 86

== Sports management ==
She is the athletic director of Immaculate Conception Academy High School in Greenhills. In October 2023, Ong was reportedly named as the first commissioner of the Women's Maharlika Pilipinas Basketball League (WMPBL). She oversaw the launch of the 2025 regular season of the WMPBL as a professional league. She later led a mass resignation in April 2026, ahead of the second regular season citing "irreconciliable differences"
