= AsiaBasket =

Asian professional basketball competition

- Current season, competition or edition: 2026 NSAC World Invitational
- Sport: Basketball
- Founded: 2021; 5 years ago
- Founder: Jai Reyes
- First season: 2021 Subic Championship
- Country: Philippines; Indonesia; Malaysia; Brunei; Thailand; United States; Chinese Taipei; Canada; Japan (all-time)
- Continent: FIBA Asia
- Broadcasters: AsiaBasket (Facebook, YouTube); One Sports+ Solar Sports
- Website: asiabasket.org

AsiaBasket is an Asian men's professional basketball competition series primarily based in the Philippines.

Originally called the Filipino Basketball League (FilBasket), it initially began as a domestic basketball league. The league began inviting international teams in 2022, eventually leading to its renaming as AsiaBasket in 2023. Since the rebrand, AsiaBasket has shifted its focus away from professional clubs and a standard league format, leaning towards youth and collegiate teams.

== History ==
=== FilBasket era (2021–2022) ===
FilBasket was established by former UAAP player Jai Reyes and Buddy Encarnado of the Maharlika Pilipinas Basketball League's Pasig Sta. Lucia Realtors in 2021. It was founded as a means to provide a platform for basketball players whose careers were disrupted by the COVID-19 pandemic in the Philippines. This includes players of the Maharlika Pilipinas Basketball League which saw its 2019–20 season suspended and the succeeding 2021 season delayed due to COVID-19 measures. Hence, multiple MPBL teams joined the FilBasket tournaments as a way to continue playing competitive games, beginning a trend of MPBL teams taking part in other leagues during the off-season.

The league went off to a bumpy start when its first tournament, the Subic Championship, ran into regulatory issues. Despite securing approval from the Subic Bay Metropolitan Authority (SBMA) and the Inter-Agency Task Force for the Management of Emerging Infectious Diseases (IATF-EID) for a bubble tournament at the Subic Bay Gymnasium, The tournament was disputed by the Games and Amusements Board (GAB) regarding its amateur status, with the GAB contending that it is a professional league, and later issuing a cease and desist order. Eventually, the GAB didn't pursue further legal action and FilBasket would subsequently begin the transition to professional status after sending a letter of intent to the GAB, which would be competed by February 2022.

As FilBasket turned professional, the league began attracting the Asian basketball market with the 2022 Summer Championship, which ran from March until May 2022. The tournament featured the first international team: the Kuala Lumpur Aseel based in Kuala Lumpur, Malaysia, being invited as a guest team.

The following tournament would also be its first international tournament, the 2022 International Championship held in the latter part of 2022 in Malaysia.

=== AsiaBasket era (2023–present) ===
On March 3, 2023, FilBasket announced their renaming to AsiaBasket to accommodate with the expansion into the Asian basketball market. The first tournament under the AsiaBasket name was the 2023 International Championship, which also took place in Malaysia in April 2023. The tournament also marked a change of focus for the league, as it was the first tournament to feature teams from the collegiate level. Later tournaments would also include youth teams from other countries focused on Filipino-foreigner players, such as the United States' Statham Academy and United Prep Canada.

In 2025, the league hosted its first all-collegiate tournament, the 2025 AsiaBasket College Campus Tour, which would later evolve into the National Student Athletes Championship from 2026 onwards.

== Recurring tournaments ==
While most tournaments revolve around the hosting of a single city or province, there are a number of recurring tournaments.

=== International Championship ===
The International Championship has been held annually since 2022 and is the only tournament where teams from outside the Philippines are invited to participate. The first two iterations of the tournament were held in Kuala Lumpur, Malaysia but has since moved to the Philippines from 2024 onwards. The tournament has been known as the International Invitational since 2025.

=== National Student Athletes Championship ===
The National Student Athletes Championship is AsiaBasket's all-collegiate tournament. The tournament uses the home-and-away format of older FilBasket tournaments in that games are held across multiple college venues. The first iteration of this tournament was held in 2025 as the College Campus Tour before rebranding to NSAC in 2026.

== Results ==
=== FilBasket era ===
Tournament	Host	Teams	Finals			Battle for third			Ref.
Tournament	Host	Teams	Champions	Score	Runner-up	Third place	Score	Fourth place	Ref.
Subic 2021	Subic	11	AICC Manila	2–1 (series)	San Juan Knights	Davao Occidental Tigers	—N/a	Pasig Sta. Lucia Realtors	
Summer 2022	Greater Manila Area (Note: The 2022 Summer Championship was co-hosted by three cities: Muntinlupa, Quezon City, and San Jose del Monte.)	12	Nueva Ecija Capitals	2–1 (series)	San Juan Knights	Tanduay Rum Masters	—N/a	All-Star Bacolod Ballers	
International 2022	Kuala Lumpur	10	Harimau Malaysia	87–68	Kuala Lumpur Aseel	Pilipinas Aguilas	81–72	MBC	

=== AsiaBasket era ===
Tournament	Host	Teams	Finals			Battle for third			Ref.
Tournament	Host	Teams	Champions	Score	Runner-up	Third place	Score	Fourth place	Ref.
International 2023	Kuala Lumpur	10	Kuala Lumpur Aseel	83–72	San Beda Red Lions	Harimau Malaysia	93–84	Benilde Blazers	
Las Piñas 2023	Las Piñas	10	Ateneo Blue Eagles	60–57	Benilde Blazers	Sanzar Pharmaceuticals	95–88	Corsa Tires	
Dasmariñas 2023	Dasmariñas	10	Benilde Blazers	105–86	Statham Academy	MisOr Mustangs	106–104	Shawarma Shack Pilipinas	
~~Cebu 2024~~	~~Toledo~~	Tournament cancelled							
International 2024	Taguig	10	NU Bulldogs	73–64	Adamson Soaring Falcons	Benilde Blazers	84–77	FEU Tamaraws	
College Campus Tour 2025	Metro Manila (Note: The 2025 College Campus Tour was co-hosted by three cities: Las Piñas, Manila, and Quezon City.)	14	De La Salle Green Archers	89–77	Ateneo Blue Eagles	NU Bulldogs	77–75	San Beda Red Lions	
International 2025	San Juan	8	Adamson Soaring Falcons	68–63	UST Growling Tigers	Letran Knights	20–0 (Note: The game was forfeited in favor of Letran due to scheduling conflicts on San Beda's side.)	San Beda Red Lions	
NSAC 2026	Metro Manila (Note: The 2026 National Student Athletes Championship will co-hosted by three cities: Las Piñas, Manila, and Quezon City.)	16	UST Growling Tigers	95–84	NU Bulldogs	De La Salle Green Archers	78–61	San Beda Red Lions	
NSAC World Invitational 2026	Pasig	8	Fighting Eagles Nagoya	92–91	UST Growling Tigers	San Beda Red Lions	70–69	JRU Heavy Bombers	
