= Afril Bernardino =

Filipino basketball player

No. 13 – Batangas New Zealand Bluefire
- Position: Forward
- League: WMPBL

Personal information
- Born: April 3, 1996 (age 30)
- Listed height: 5 ft 8 in (1.73 m)
- Listed weight: 139 lb (63 kg)

Career information
- College: NU
- Playing career: 2018–present

Career history
- 2018–2019: Valkyrie Hatchers
- 2025: Philippine Navy
- 2025-present: Batangas New Zealand Bluefire

Career highlights
- 4x WMPBL MVP (2025 Invitational, 2025, 2026, 2026); 2x WMPBL Mythical Team (2025 Invitational, 2026); WMPBL Finals MVP (2025); 3× UAAP champion (2014–2016); UAAP Finals MVP (2015); 3× UAAP MVP (2014–2016); 4× UAAP Mythical Team (2013–2016); 1x FIBA 3x3 Asia Cup Women's Team of the Tournament (2026)
Medals
Women's basketball
Philippines
SEABA Championship
| Gold medal – first place | 2016 Malacca City | Team |
SEA Games
| Gold medal – first place | 2019 Philippines | Team |
| Gold medal – first place | 2021 Hanoi | Team |
| Gold medal – first place | 2025 Bangkok | Team |
| Silver medal – second place | 2023 Phnom Penh | Team |
Women's 3x3 basketball
Asia Cup
| Silver medal – second place | 2026 Singapore | Team |
SEA Games
| Gold medal – first place | 2019 Philippines | Team |
| Silver medal – second place | 2023 Phnom Penh | Team |

Afril Ornedo Bernardino (born April 3, 1996) is a Filipino professional basketball player. She also represents the Philippine national team in international competitions.

== College career ==
She played for the NU Lady Bulldogs, the women's team of the National University (NU), in the UAAP from Seasons 75 to 79. She has been included in the Mythical Team from Season 76-79. In 2014, she led National University to its first UAAP women's basketball championship bagging her first MVP award in Season 77. In 2015, Bernardino was named the Most Valuable Player and Finals MVP in the UAAP Season 78 women's basketball tournament. In her final year, she was named the Most Valuable player leading NU to its 3rd straight championship and also won and became champions of the inaugural UAAP women's 3x3 basketball competition. She has consumed all her playing years in UAAP by 2017 after competing at UAAP Season 79

== Professional career ==
After college, Bernardino joined the Malaysian Women's Basketball League in 2018 and played as an import for the Valkyrie Hatchers.

Bernardino considered joining the Women's National Basketball League through the 2021 draft but her affiliation with the Philippine Navy rendered her ineligible.

=== Philippine Navy Lady Sailors ===
Bernardino was part of the Philippine Navy Lady Sailors of the Women's Maharlika Pilipinas Basketball League (WMPBL). She won the MVP award for the 2025 Invitational Tournament.

=== Batangas New Zealand Blufire ===
Bernardino moved to Batangas New Zealand Blufire helping the team win the inaugural 2025 WMPBL professional season. She won the MVP award once again. New Zealand Blufire finished as runners-up for the 2026 season although she was named as season MVP once again.

== National team career ==
She has represented the Philippines in international basketball competitions such as the 2015 FIBA Asia Women's Championship, the 2015 Southeast Asian Games, and the 2016 SEABA Championship. Team Philippines won their first-ever women's basketball championship at the 2019 Southeast Asian Games held in the Philippines. Also winning gold in the 3x3 women's basketball tourney along with Jack Animam, Janine Pontejos and Clare Castro.

Bernardino is also part of the national 3x3 team which competed for the Philippines at the 2018 FIBA 3x3 World Cup. Bernardino helped the team win a silve medal at the 2026 FIBA 3x3 Asia Cup where she was also named part of the Women's Team of the Tournament.

== Personal life ==
Bernardino has finished the Sailor Basic Course as part of Mahitala (Mandaragat na Hinubog ng Talino at Lakas) Class 22, 23, 24, and 25 with the Philippine Navy.
