= 2023 AsiaBasket International Championship =

Fourth tournament of FilBasket / AsiaBasket; first in 2023

Tournament details
- Country: Malaysia
- Dates: April 9–18, 2023
- Teams: 10

Final positions
- Champions: Kuala Lumpur Aseel (1st title)
- Runners-up: San Beda Red Lions
- Third place: Harimau Malaysia
- Fourth place: CSB Blazers

The 2023 AsiaBasket International Championship was the fourth tournament under AsiaBasket, formerly known as FilBasket, and the first of three tournaments held in 2023. It was held from April 9 to 18, 2023 in Kuala Lumpur, Malaysia with teams from both the host country and the Philippines.

Malaysian team Kuala Lumpur Aseel won over Philippine collegiate team San Beda–Machateam Red Lions in the final.

== Teams ==
The tournament featured seven teams from the Philippines and three from Malaysia.

Name	Locality	Country	Head coach
Kuala Lumpur Aseel	Kuala Lumpur	Malaysia	(Philippines) Kristoffer Reyes
Harimau Malaysia	Kuala Lumpur	Malaysia	(Malaysia) Yong Kian Ann
MBC Kirin	Malacca City	Malaysia	(Malaysia) Guganeswaran Batumalai
BGC Builders	Taguig City	Philippines	(Philippines) S. Cantos
CSB Blazers	Malate, Manila	Philippines	(Philippines) Charles Tiu
MFT Fruit Masters	Quezon City	Philippines	(Philippines) J. Padrigao
San Beda–Machateam Red Lions	Mendiola, Manila	Philippines	(Philippines) Yuri Escueta
Sanzar Pharmaceuticals	Las Pinas	Philippines	(Philippines) J. Gican
Shawarma Shack Pilipinas	Quezon City	Philippines	(Philippines) Raymond Valenzona
The Th3rd Floor – KalosPH	Quezon City	Philippines	(Philippines) J. Guion

== Format ==
The ten teams are divided into two groups of five, from there each team plays one game against all other teams from the same group, with each team playing four games.

The top two teams from each group will then advance to the single-elimination knockout stage. The first round is a crossover semifinals, where the first-seed from each group is matched with the second-seed from the opposing group. The winning teams advance to the finals while the losing teams compete in a third place game.

== Group stage ==
=== Group A ===
Pos	Team	Pld	W	L	PF	PA	PD	PCT	Qualification	CSB	MAS	SHS	SAN	MFT
1	Benilde Blazers	4	4	0	345	277	+68	1.000	Semifinals	—	80–66	79–68	93–80	93–63
2	Harimau Malaysia	4	3	1	358	276	+82	.750	Semifinals	66–80	—	96–76	81–54	115–66
3	Shawarma Shack Pilipinas	4	2	2	301	326	−25	.500		68–79	76–96	—	86–82	71–69
4	Sanzar Pharmaceuticals	4	1	3	291	333	−42	.250		80–93	54–81	82–86	—	75–73
5	MFT Fruit Masters	4	0	4	271	354	−83	.000		63–93	66–115	69–71	73–75	—

Source: Filbasket (via Genius Sports)
Rules for classification: 1) Win percentage; 2) Head-to-head record; 3) Head-to-head point differential; 4) Head-to-head points scored; 5) Overall point differential; 6) Overall points scored.

April 9	Sanzar (Philippines)	82–86	(Philippines) Shawarma Shack	Kuala Lumpur
17:00
		Boxscore		Arena: MABA Stadium

April 11	CSB Blazers (Philippines)	93–80	(Philippines) Sanzar	Kuala Lumpur
14:00
		Boxscore		Arena: MABA Stadium

April 11	Harimau Malaysia	115–66	(Philippines) MFT Fruit Masters	Kuala Lumpur
14:00
		Boxscore		Arena: MABA Stadium

April 12	MFT Fruit Masters (Philippines)	63–93	(Philippines) CSB Blazers	Kuala Lumpur
16:00
		Boxscore		Arena: MABA Stadium

April 12	Shawarma Shack (Philippines)	76–96	Harimau Malaysia	Kuala Lumpur
20:00
		Boxscore		Arena: MABA Stadium

April 13	Sanzar (Philippines)	75–73	(Philippines) MFT Fruit Masters	Kuala Lumpur
14:00
		Boxscore		Arena: MABA Stadium

April 13	CSB Blazers (Philippines)	79–68	(Philippines) Shawarma Shack	Kuala Lumpur
18:00
		Boxscore		Arena: MABA Stadium

April 14	Shawarma Shack (Philippines)	71–69	(Philippines) MFT Fruit Masters	Kuala Lumpur
16:00
		Boxscore		Arena: MABA Stadium

April 14	Harimau Malaysia	66–80	(Philippines) CSB Blazers	Kuala Lumpur
20:00
		Boxscore		Arena: MABA Stadium

April 15	Sanzar (Philippines)	54–81	Harimau Malaysia	Kuala Lumpur
19:00
		Boxscore		Arena: MABA Stadium

=== Group B ===
Pos	Team	Pld	W	L	PF	PA	PD	PCT	Qualification	SBU	KLA	MBC	BGC	THF
1	San Beda Red Lions	4	3	1	389	328	+61	.750 (Note: San Beda (+8), Kuala Lumpur (0), and MBC (-8) are ranked by head-to-head point differential.)	Semifinals	—	106–108	68–58	105–82	110–80
2	Kuala Lumpur Aseel	4	3	1	370	326	+44	.750	Semifinals	108–106	—	83–85	91–63	88–72
3	MBC Kirin	4	3	1	347	331	+16	.750		58–68	85–83	—	112–95	92–85
4	BGC Builders	4	1	3	338	403	−65	.250		82–105	63–91	95–112	—	98–95
5	The Th3rd Floor – KalosPH	4	0	4	332	388	−56	.000		80–110	72–88	85–92	95–98	—

Source: Filbasket (via Genius Sports)
Rules for classification: 1) Win percentage; 2) Head-to-head record; 3) Head-to-head point differential; 4) Head-to-head points scored; 5) Overall point differential; 6) Overall points scored.
Notes:

April 9	MBC Kirin (Malaysia)	92–85	(Philippines) The Th3rd Floor	Kuala Lumpur
19:00
		Boxscore		Arena: MABA Stadium

April 11	BGC Builders (Philippines)	82–105	(Philippines) San Beda Red Lions	Kuala Lumpur
16:00
		Boxscore		Arena: MABA Stadium

April 11	KL Aseel (Malaysia)	83–85	(Malaysia) MBC Kirin	Kuala Lumpur
20:00
		Boxscore		Arena: MABA Stadium

April 12	The Th3rd Floor (Philippines)	95–98	(Philippines) BGC Builders	Kuala Lumpur
14:00
		Boxscore		Arena: MABA Stadium

April 12	San Beda Red Lions (Philippines)	68–58	(Malaysia) MBC Kirin	Kuala Lumpur
18:00
		Boxscore		Arena: MABA Stadium

April 13	MBC Kirin (Malaysia)	112–95	(Philippines) BGC Builders	Kuala Lumpur
16:00
		Boxscore		Arena: MABA Stadium

April 13	KL Aseel (Malaysia)	108–106	(Philippines) San Beda Red Lions	Kuala Lumpur
20:00
		Boxscore		Arena: MABA Stadium

April 14	San Beda Red Lions (Philippines)	110–80	(Philippines) The Th3rd Floor	Kuala Lumpur
14:00
		Boxscore		Arena: MABA Stadium

April 14	BGC Builders (Philippines)	63–91	(Malaysia) KL Aseel	Kuala Lumpur
18:00
		Boxscore		Arena: MABA Stadium

April 15	The Th3rd Floor (Philippines)	72–88	(Malaysia) KL Aseel	Kuala Lumpur
19:00
		Boxscore		Arena: MABA Stadium

== Knockout stage ==
The top two teams from the group stage advanced to the semifinals. The winners advanced for a one-game final while the losers contested in the third place play-off game.

Semifinals
B1	(Philippines) San Beda Red Lions	83
A2	Harimau Malaysia	72
A1	(Philippines) CSB Blazers	87
B2	(Malaysia) KL Aseel	90

Finals
B1	(Philippines) San Beda Red Lions	72
B2	(Malaysia) KL Aseel	83
Third place
A2	Harimau Malaysia	93
A1	(Philippines) CSB Blazers	84

=== Semifinals ===
April 16	San Beda Red Lions (Philippines)	83–72	Harimau Malaysia	Kuala Lumpur
17:00
	Pts: Andrada 23; Rebs: Andrada 12; Asts: Cometa 5	Boxscore	Pts: C. Ting 24; Rebs: Mahadevan 7 Asts: 3 players 3	Arena: MABA Stadium; Attendance: 1,000

April 16	CSB Blazers (Philippines)	87–90	(Malaysia) KL Aseel	Kuala Lumpur
19:00
	Pts: Corteza 24; Rebs: Turco 13; Asts: Oczon 10	Boxscore	Pts: Robinson 29; Rebs: Robinson 21; Asts: 6 players 2	Arena: MABA Stadium; Attendance: 1,000

=== Third place game ===
April 18	Harimau Malaysia	93–84	(Philippines) CSB Blazers	Kuala Lumpur
17:00
	Pts: Y. Wong 26; Rebs: C. Ting 11; Asts: C. Ting, C. Lim 3	Boxscore	Pts: Carlos 21; Rebs: Nayve 6 Asts: Nayve 9	Arena: MABA Stadium; Attendance: 200

=== Final ===
April 18	San Beda Red Lions (Philippines)	72–83	(Malaysia) KL Aseel	Kuala Lumpur
19:00
	Pts: Cortez 19; Rebs: Andrada 11; Asts: Cortez 6	Boxscore	Pts: Robinson 31; Rebs: Robinson 21; Asts: Robinson 4	Arena: MABA Stadium; Attendance: 500
