= 2022 FilBasket International Championship =

Third tournament of FilBasket; second in 2022

2022 Filbasket International Championship

Tournament details
- Country: Malaysia
- Dates: October 23–30, 2022
- Teams: 10

Final positions
- Champions: Harimau Malaysia (1st title)
- Runners-up: Kuala Lumpur Aseel
- Third place: Pilipinas Aguilas
- Fourth place: MBC

Awards
- Best player: Ting Chun Hong (Harimau Malaysia)

The 2022 FilBasket International Championship, also known as the 2022 Sportsclick FilBasket International Championship – Malaysia for sponsorship reasons, was the third tournament of the Philippine-based FilBasket league, the second tournament of 2022, and the last tournament prior to the league's renaming as AsiaBasket.

The tournament was held in Kuala Lumpur, Malaysia, and was organized in coordination with the Samahang Basketbol ng Pilipinas and the Malaysia Basketball Association.

After inviting Kuala Lumpur Aseel as a guest team in the previous tournament, this tournament marked the league's further expansion into the Southeast Asia region, with seven of the ten teams being from outside the Philippines.

The Malaysia national team, playing as "Harimau Malaysia", clinched the title by beating fellow Malaysian team Kuala Lumpur Aseel in the final. It was the first time the two finalists are based outside the Philippines.

== Teams ==
| Name | Locality | Country | Head coach |
|---|---|---|---|
| Pegasus Brunei | Bandar Seri Begawan | Brunei | (Philippines) Jade Padrigao |
| Bumi Borneo | Pontianak, West Kalimantan | Indonesia | (Indonesia) Tondi Raja Syailendra |
| Elang Pacific Caesar | Surabaya | Indonesia | (Indonesia) R. Aries Herman M. |
| Kuala Lumpur Aseel | Kuala Lumpur | Malaysia | (Malaysia) Ee Kee Lip |
| Harimau Malaysia | Kuala Lumpur | Malaysia | (Philippines) Jeff Viernes |
| MBC Basketball Club | Malacca City | Malaysia | (Malaysia) Guganeswaran Batumalai |
| BGC Builders | Taguig City | Philippines | (Philippines) Joevanne Agbong |
| Pilipinas Aguilas | | Philippines | (Philippines) Luis Monfort |
| Shawarma Shack–Makabayan Warriors | Quezon City | Philippines | (Philippines) Tylon Darjuan |
| Adroit Sports Association | Woodlands | Singapore | (Singapore) Chan Sian Gay |

== Format ==
Instead of using a single round-robin tournament like the first two tournaments, this tournament uses the group stage format that is still used today. The ten teams are divided into two groups of five, from there each team plays one game against all other teams from the same group, with each team playing four games.

The top two teams from each group will then advance to the single-elimination knockout stage. The first round is a crossover semifinals, where the first-seed from each group is matched with the second-seed from the opposing group. The winning teams advance to the finals while the losing teams compete in a new third place game.

== Group stage ==
=== Group A ===
| Pos | Team | Pld | W | L | PF | PA | PD | PCT | Qualification | MAS | PIL | BUM | BGC | ADR |
|---|---|---|---|---|---|---|---|---|---|---|---|---|---|---|
| 1 | Harimau Malaysia | 4 | 4 | 0 | 368 | 293 | +75 | 1.000 | Semifinals | — | 84–77 | 98–77 | 86–54 | 100–85 |
| 2 | Pilipinas Aguilas | 4 | 3 | 1 | 316 | 277 | +39 | .750 | Semifinals | 77–84 | — | 74–63 | 79–61 | 86–69 |
| 3 | Bumi Borneo | 4 | 2 | 2 | 305 | 318 | −13 | .500 | | 77–98 | 63–74 | — | 82–69 | 83–77 |
| 4 | BGC Builders | 4 | 1 | 3 | 280 | 328 | −48 | .250 | | 54–86 | 61–79 | 69–82 | — | 96–81 |
| 5 | Adroit Sports Association | 4 | 0 | 4 | 312 | 365 | −53 | .000 | | 85–100 | 69–86 | 77–83 | 81–96 | — |

Source: Filbasket (via Genius Sports)
Rules for classification: 1) Win percentage; 2) Head-to-head record; 3) Head-to-head point differential; 4) Head-to-head points scored; 5) Overall point differential; 6) Overall points scored.

| October 23 | Bumi Borneo (Indonesia) | 82–69 | (Philippines) BGC Builders | Kuala Lumpur |
| | Scoring by quarter: 18–12, 28–14, 24–29, 28–22 |
| | | Boxscore | | Arena: MABA Stadium |

| October 23 | Harimau Malaysia | 84–77 | (Philippines) Pilipinas Aguilas | Kuala Lumpur |
| | | Boxscore | | Arena: MABA Stadium |

| October 24 | Adroit (Singapore) | 77–83 | (Indonesia) Bumi Borneo | Kuala Lumpur |
| | | Boxscore | | Arena: MABA Stadium |

| October 24 | BGC Builders (Philippines) | 54–86 | Harimau Malaysia | Kuala Lumpur |
| | | Boxscore | | Arena: MABA Stadium |

| October 25 | Pilipinas Aguilas (Philippines) | 79–61 | (Philippines) BGC Builders | Kuala Lumpur |
| | Pts: http://www.fibalivestats.com/webcast/BEBL// | Boxscore] | | Arena: MABA Stadium |

| October 25 | Harimau Malaysia | 100–85 | (Singapore) Adroit | Kuala Lumpur |
| | | Boxscore | | Arena: MABA Stadium |

| October 26 | Adroit (Singapore) | 81–96 | (Philippines) BGC Builders | Kuala Lumpur |
| | | Boxscore | | Arena: MABA Stadium |

| October 26 | Bumi Borneo (Indonesia) | 63–74 | (Philippines) Pilipinas Aguilas | Kuala Lumpur |
| | | Boxscore | | Arena: MABA Stadium |

| October 27 | Pilipinas Aguilas (Philippines) | 86–69 | (Singapore) Adroit | Kuala Lumpur |
| | | Boxscore | | Arena: MABA Stadium |

| October 27 | Harimau Malaysia | 98–77 | (Indonesia) Bumi Borneo | Kuala Lumpur |
| | | Boxscore | | Arena: MABA Stadium |

=== Group B ===
| Pos | Team | Pld | W | L | PF | PA | PD | PCT | Qualification | KLA | MBC | PEG | MKB | PCC |
|---|---|---|---|---|---|---|---|---|---|---|---|---|---|---|
| 1 | Kuala Lumpur Aseel | 4 | 3 | 1 | 314 | 295 | +19 | .750 (Note: Kuala Lumpur Aseel wins tiebreaker over MBC by head-to-head victory.) | Semifinals | — | 81–60 | 80–79 | 80–73 | 73–83 |
| 2 | MBC Basketball Club | 4 | 3 | 1 | 296 | 294 | +2 | .750 | Semifinals | 60–81 | — | 103–87 | 61–59 | 72–67 |
| 3 | Pegasus Brunei | 4 | 2 | 2 | 361 | 369 | −8 | .500 | | 79–80 | 87–103 | — | 107–105 | 88–81 |
| 4 | Makabayan Warriors | 4 | 1 | 3 | 330 | 334 | −4 | .250 (Note: Makabayan wins tiebreaker over Pacific Caesar by head-to-head victory.) | | 73–80 | 59–61 | 105–107 | — | 93–86 |
| 5 | Elang Pacific Caesar | 4 | 1 | 3 | 317 | 326 | −9 | .250 | | 83–73 | 67–72 | 81–88 | 86–93 | — |

Source: Filbasket (via Genius Sports)
Rules for classification: 1) Win percentage; 2) Head-to-head record; 3) Head-to-head point differential; 4) Head-to-head points scored; 5) Overall point differential; 6) Overall points scored.
Notes:

| October 23 | Elang Pacific Caesar (Indonesia) | 81–88 | Pegasus Brunei | Kuala Lumpur |
| | | Boxscore | | Arena: MABA Stadium |

| October 23 | KL Aseel (Malaysia) | 81–60 | (Malaysia) MBC | Kuala Lumpur |
| | | Boxscore | | Arena: MABA Stadium |

| October 24 | Makabayan Warriors (Philippines) | 93–86 | (Indonesia) Elang Pacific Caesar | Kuala Lumpur |
| | | Boxscore | | Arena: MABA Stadium |

| October 24 | Pegasus Brunei | 79–80 | (Malaysia) KL Aseel | Kuala Lumpur |
| | | Boxscore | | Arena: MABA Stadium |

| October 25 | Makabayan Warriors (Philippines) | 105–107 | Pegasus Brunei | Kuala Lumpur |
| | | Boxscore | | Arena: MABA Stadium |

| October 25 | Elang Pacific Caesar (Indonesia) | 67–72 | (Malaysia) MBC | Kuala Lumpur |
| | | Boxscore | | Arena: MABA Stadium |

| October 26 | MBC (Malaysia) | 103–87 | Pegasus Brunei | Kuala Lumpur |
| | | Boxscore | | Arena: MABA Stadium |

| October 26 | KL Aseel (Malaysia) | 80–73 | (Philippines) Makabayan Warriors | Kuala Lumpur |
| | | Boxscore | | Arena: MABA Stadium |

| October 27 | Makabayan Warriors (Philippines) | 59–61 | (Malaysia) MBC | Kuala Lumpur |
| | | Boxscore | | Arena: MABA Stadium |

| October 27 | Elang Pacific Caesar (Indonesia) | 83–73 | (Malaysia) KL Aseel | Kuala Lumpur |
| | | Boxscore | | Arena: MABA Stadium |

== Knockout stage ==
The top two teams from the elimination round advanced to the semifinals. The winners advanced for a one-game final while the losers contested in the third place play-off game.

Semifinals
B1 | (Malaysia) KL Aseel | 72
A2 | (Philippines) Pilipinas Aguilas | 63
A1 | Harimau Malaysia | 92
B2 | (Malaysia) MBC | 59

Finals
B1 | (Malaysia) KL Aseel | 68
A1 | Harimau Malaysia | 87
Third place
A2 | (Philippines) Pilipinas Aguilas | 81
B2 | (Malaysia) MBC | 72

=== Semifinals ===
| October 29 | KL Aseel (Malaysia) | 72–63 | (Philippines) Pilipinas Aguilas | Kuala Lumpur |
| 18:00 |
| | Pts: Y. Wee 18; Rebs: Mahadevan 13; Asts: J. Wong 5 | Boxscore | Pts: Baracael 18; Rebs: Eze 15; Asts: Reyes 4 | Arena: MABA Stadium; Attendance: 2,500 |

| October 29 | Harimau Malaysia | 92–59 | (Malaysia) MBC | Kuala Lumpur |
| 20:00 |
| | Pts: C. Ting 34; Rebs: A. Wen Qian 9 Asts: W. Ong 4 | Boxscore | Pts: Y. Phang 14; Rebs: Hamilton 10; Asts: J. Lee 7 | Arena: MABA Stadium; Attendance: 2,500 |

=== Third place game ===
| October 30 | Pilipinas Aguilas (Philippines) | 81–72 | (Malaysia) MBC | Kuala Lumpur |
| 18:00 |
| | Pts: Baracael 24; Rebs: Eze 10; Asts: Mangahas 4 | Boxscore | Pts: Hamilton 22; Rebs: Hamilton 16; Asts: J. Lee 5 | Arena: MABA Stadium; Attendance: 200 |

=== Final ===
| October 30 | Harimau Malaysia | 87–68 | (Malaysia) KL Aseel | Kuala Lumpur |
| 20:00 |
| | Pts: W. Ong 16; Rebs: W. Ong 7 Asts: Y. Heng 5 | Boxscore | Pts: Y. Wee 14; Rebs: Mahadevan 8 Asts: J. Wong 3 | Arena: MABA Stadium; Attendance: 200 |
