= Tiffany Bias =

American-Thai basketball player (born 1992)

Free agent
- Position: Point guard

Personal information
- Born: May 22, 1992 (age 34) Wichita, Kansas, U.S.
- Listed height: 5 ft 7 in (1.70 m)
- Listed weight: 135 lb (61 kg)

Career information
- High school: Central (Andover, Kansas)
- College: Oklahoma State (2010–2014)
- WNBA draft: 2014: 2nd round, 17th overall pick
- Drafted by: Phoenix Mercury
- Playing career: 2014–2019

Career history
- 2014–2015: Phoenix Mercury
- 2014–2016: Diósgyőri VTK
- 2016: Dallas Wings
- 2016: Maccabi Ranana
- 2019: New York Liberty

Career highlights
- WNBA champion (2014); Hungarian Cup winner (2016); 3× All-Big 12 (2012–2014); Big 12 All-Defensive Team (2014)
- Stats at WNBA.com
- Stats at Basketball Reference
Medals
Women's basketball
Representing Thailand
Southeast Asian Games
Silver medal – second place	2019 Philippines	Team

Tiffany Christine Bias (born May 22, 1992) is a former American-Thai professional basketball player who last played for the New York Liberty of the Women's National Basketball Association (WNBA). She was selected in the second round of the 2014 WNBA draft, 17th overall.

In 2024, she was named to the first-ever 32-member Big 12 Alumni Council. She has worked as a sideline reporter at the Big 12 Tournament, while also appearing on its pre- and postgame shows.

In 2025, she began her first season as a Dallas Wings sideline reporter.

== High school career ==
Bias attended Andover Central High School where she was a multiple sport athlete. Bias was a three-year captain for the girls basketball team. She was also named to the first team Kansas Basketball Coaches Association All State Team as a sophomore, junior and senior.

During her sophomore year, she led the girls basketball team to a 26–0 record, along with a Class 4A state title. In her junior year, Bias set the state tournament scoring record with 89 points, while helped her team to a third-place finish tournament. In her senior year, Bias once again led her team to another state title in 2010, this time finishing with a 25–0 record.

In March 2010, Bias received the prestigious Gatorade Girl Basketball Player of the Year Award after her senior season. She was the first Gatorade Kansas Girls Basketball Player of the Year to be chosen from Andover Central High School, according to a press release.

She finished her high school career with 1,780 points, 452 steals, and 592 assist while helping Central to a 91–8 record. Bias also played volleyball and ran track for three years at Central. She was a two-time state champion in the 200 meters and a three-time state champion in the 400 meters.

She was inducted into the Andover Central High School Jaguar Hall of Fame in February 2016.

== College career ==
Bias accepted a scholarship to play for the Cowgirls at Oklahoma State University. Bias was also considering scholarships from Kansas, Kansas State, Colorado, Missouri, UCLA, UTEP, LSU, and Arizona.

Bias played four years of basketball at Oklahoma State University. She was recognized for her defense and her ability to record assists. In her freshman year, Bias started in 31 of 32 games and finished the season with 135 assists, which was good enough for second most assist by a freshman Oklahoma State University player. In her sophomore year Bias was named to the second-team All-Big 12 team in just her second year. She finished the season with 229 assists, which shattered the single season assist record for any OSU player. Bias was also finished ranked seventh in the nation in assists.

In her junior season, she was once again named to the second-team All-Big 12 team along with an honorable mention for the All-American team. On February 2 against Baylor Bias become only the 20th Cowgirl to score 1,000 career points and only the 2nd Cowgirl with 500 career assists.

In her senior year, she led the Cowgirls to the sweet sixteen for only the third time in school history. Bias was named to the All-Big 12 First team, as she led the conference in minutes played. She also finished second in the conference in both steals and assists, along with a tenth-place finish in points.

=== Oklahoma State statistics ===
Legend
GP	Games played	GS	Games started	MPG	Minutes per game
FG%	Field goal percentage	3P%	3-point field goal percentage	FT%	Free throw percentage
RPG	Rebounds per game	APG	Assists per game	SPG	Steals per game
BPG	Blocks per game	PPG	Points per game	**Bold**	Career high

Year	Team	GP	Points	FG%	3P%	FT%	RPG	APG	SPG	BPG	PPG
2010-11	Oklahoma State	32	310	32.8%	23.5%	76.2%	2.8	4.2	2.0	0.1	9.7
2011-12	Oklahoma State	**34**	445	36.5%	22.3%	65.9%	3.1	**6.7**	**2.5**	**0.3**	13.1
2012-13	Oklahoma State	33	397	**39.4%**	**28.6%**	**77.0%**	**3.2**	6.5	2.3	0.1	12.0
2013-14	Oklahoma State	**34**	**471**	38.8%	**28.6%**	69.3%	3.1	6.2	2.1	0.1	**13.9**
Career		133	1623	37.0%	25.4%	71.2%	3.1	5.9	2.2	0.1	12.2

== Professional career ==
=== WNBA ===
Bias was selected in the second round (17th overall) of the 2014 WNBA draft by the Phoenix Mercury. Bias received limited playing time in her first year as she averaged 4.0 minutes played per game and 1.1 points per game. Playing alongside Brittney Griner, Diana Taurasi and Candice Dupree, Bias and the Mercury would post a 29–5 record (most wins in WNBA history) and would eventually win the 2014 WNBA championship after sweeping the Chicago Sky in the finals. After two seasons played with the Mercury, she was waived by the team in 2016. She would then sign with the Seattle Storm but would be waived days later before the start of the season. Midway through the 2016 season, Bias signed a 7-day contract with the Dallas Wings. Bias would then re-sign with the Wings for the remainder of the season after her 7-day contract expired. In February 2017, Bias re-signed with the Wings to a one-year deal in free agency. In May 2017, Bias was waived by the Wings. In April 2019, Bias signed a training camp contract for the New York Liberty. In May 2019, Bias would make the final roster for the team.

=== WNBA career statistics ===
Legend
GP	Games played	GS	Games started	MPG	Minutes per game	RPG	Rebounds per game
APG	Assists per game	SPG	Steals per game	BPG	Blocks per game	PPG	Points per game
TO	Turnovers per game	FG%	Field-goal percentage	3P%	3-point field-goal percentage	FT%	Free-throw percentage
**Bold**	Career best	°	League leader

==== Regular season ====
Year	Team	GP	GS	MPG	FG%	3P%	FT%	RPG	APG	SPG	BPG	TO	PPG
2014	Phoenix	**17**	0	4.0	**38.9**	**33.3**	33.3	0.2	0.4	**0.3**	0.0	0.7	1.1
2015	Phoenix	15	0	6.3	34.5	**33.3**	66.7	0.1	0.7	0.1	0.0	**0.4**	1.9
2016	Dallas	10	0	6.4	34.8	27.3	83.3	**0.5**	0.6	0.2	0.0	1.1	**2.9**
2019	New York	12	0	**8.8**	25.0	15.8	**85.7**	**0.5**	**0.9**	**0.3**	0.0	0.7	1.9
Career	4 years, 3 teams	54	0	6.1	32.7	25.0	71.0	0.3	0.6	0.2	0.0	0.7	1.8

==== Playoffs ====
Year	Team	GP	GS	MPG	FG%	3P%	FT%	RPG	APG	SPG	BPG	TO	PPG
2014	Phoenix	**4**	0	2.3	0.0	0.0	0.0	0.3	0.3	0.0	0.0	**0.0**	0.0
2015	Phoenix	2	0	**3.5**	**50.0**	0.0	**50.0**	**0.5**	**0.5**	**0.5**	0.0	0.5	**2.5**
Career	2 years, 1 team	6	0	2.7	40.0	0.0	50.0	0.3	0.3	0.2	0.0	0.2	0.8

=== Overseas ===
From 2014 to 2016, Bias played two off-seasons in Hungary for Diósgyőri VTK and won a championship with the team in her second year. As of August 2016, Bias signed a short-term deal to play in Israel for Maccabi Ranana during the 2016-17 WNBA off-season.

Bias also played for the Thai national team, participating in the 2019 Southeast Asian Games.

== Personal life ==
Bias was born in Wichita, Kansas. She is the daughter of Judy and Francis Bias. With her father's encouragement, she started playing basketball at age 5.

Bias also has a sister Cierra and two brothers named Dominique and Trey. Her mother's side of the family is also originally from Thailand. She is married to Tyler Patmon and has three daughters.

Outside of basketball, Bias has pursued other ventures such as modeling, clothing design, and real estate. She is also vice president and co-founder of Camp Exposure, a faith-based youth sports organization, with her husband.
