= Tagaytay 'Tol Patriots =

Women's basketball team in the Philippines

- League: WMPBL
- Founded: 2024; 2 years ago
- History: Cavite 'Tol Patriots (2024–2025); Tagaytay 'Tol Patriots (2025)
- Location: Tagaytay, Cavite
- General manager: Micko Tolentino
- Head coach: Mandell Martirez
- Ownership: Francis Tolentino

The Tagaytay 'Tol Patriots (stylized as Tagaytay 'TOL Patriots), formerly the Cavite 'Tol Patriots, are a Filipino women's professional basketball team based in Tagaytay, Cavite. The team competes in the Women's Maharlika Pilipinas Basketball League (WMPBL), and is named after its owner, Senator Francis Tolentino.

== History ==
The Cavite 'Tol Patriots was formed around 2024 as a representative team for Cavite in the newly formed Women's Maharlika Pilipinas Basketball League (WMPBL) and is owned by Senator Francis "Tol" Tolentino. Tolentino also sponsors the WMPBL itself along with Manny Pacquiao and the MPBL Partylist. The first try-outs for the 'Tol Patriots was held in November 2024 in Tagaytay led by coach Norman Manguinao and coach Angelica Valera of Cavite State University.

At the 2025 WMPBL Invitational Tournament, the Patriots advanced to the quarterfinals as the fourth seeded team. However they got eliminated by Discovery Perlas which held a twice-to-beat advantage.

They played at the 2025 regular season under the newly professionalized WMPBL as the Tagaytay–Tol Patriots.
