= Women's PBA 3x3 =

Philippine women's basketball competition

Tournament information
- Sport: 3x3 basketball
- Location: Philippines
- Established: 2015
- Defunct: 2024
- Teams: 6 (2024)

Current champion
- Uratex Dream (1st title)

Most recent tournament
- 2024 PBA Women's 3x3 Invitational

The Women's PBA (WPBA) 3x3 is a women's 3x3 basketball competition organized by the Philippine Basketball Association.

== History ==
Following the promotion of the Philippine women's national team to Division I of the FIBA Asia Women's Championship due to their finish in the Division II tournament of the 2015 edition, the Philippine Basketball Association announced on September 24, 2015 that they would host a women's 3x3 tournament in the 2015–16 PBA season. The tournament was meant as a "test market" for women's basketball. Among the regulations imposed on the players, is that they are not allowed to sport a "boy's cut" hairstyle.

=== 2015–16 PBA season ===
The tournament was officially launched on October 23, 2015 as the PBA Dickies Women's 3x3 Challenge as part of the 2015-16 PBA Philippine Cup. The first games of the tournament were also played as part of the launch. Blackwater Elite claimed the inaugural title by beating Barangay Ginebra San Miguel in the best of three finals while NLEX Road Warriors claimed third place by winning over the Alaska Aces.

For the second conference, the 2016 PBA Commissioner's Cup, the tournament featuring 12 teams was known as the PBA Tag Heuer Women’s 3×3 Tournament. Ginebra placed third at the expense of TNT KaTropa while NLEX claimed the title in Game 2 of their best of three finals against the Rain or Shine Elasto Painters.

In the 2016 PBA Governors' Cup conference, the GlobalPort Batang Pier clinched the title by beating Ginebra in the best of three series.

=== 2023–24 PBA season: Invitational ===
In October 2023, the PBA announced that it would be bringing back women's 3x3. The Invitational WPBA 3x3 with six teams including two squads of the Philippine national team are set to launch in January 22, 2024, coinciding with the third conference of its men's counterpart.

== Teams ==
The twelve franchise teams of the main men's league have played in the Women's PBA 3x3 for the 2015–16 season. For the 2023 tournament, all six teams are not linked to a franchise.

Team	Affiliated organization	Joined
Angelis Resort 3x3	Angelis Resort	2024
Gilas A	N/A (Philippine national team)	2024
Gilas B	N/A (Philippine national team)	2024
Philippine Air Force 3x3	Philippine Air Force	2024
Philippine Navy 3x3	Philippine Navy	2024
Uratex Dream	Uratex Philippines	2024

== Results ==
PBA season	Conference	Champion	Second place	Third place	Fourth place
2015–16	First	Blackwater Elite	Barangay Ginebra San Miguel	NLEX Road Warriors	Alaska Aces
2015–16	Second	NLEX Road Warriors	Rain or Shine Elasto Painters	Barangay Ginebra San Miguel	TNT KaTropa
2015–16	Third	GlobalPort Batang Pier	Barangay Ginebra San Miguel	No information	
2016–17 to 2022–23	Not held				
2023–24	Invitational	Uratex Dream	Gilas B	Angelis Resort	Philippine Navy

== See also ==
- PBA 3x3
- Chooks-to-Go Pilipinas 3x3
