= 2025 WMPBL season =

1st season of the Women's Maharlika Pilipinas Basketball League

Tournament details
- Country: Philippines
- Dates: June 29 – November 16
- Teams: 6

Final positions
- Champions: Batangas New Zealand Bluefire
- Runners-up: Discovery–Perlas

Awards
- MVP: Afril Bernardino (Batangas)

The 2025 WMPBL season is the inaugural regular season of the Women's Maharlika Pilipinas Basketball League as a professional league.

It follows the Invitational Tournament which was held from January to April 2025. The WMPBL season itself will commence on June 29, 2025.

Pilipinas Aguilas, defending champions and an amateur team are not participating.

== Format ==
The 2025 regular season will start with the elimination round where all six participating teams will figure in a double round robin. The top two teams will earn a bye to the semifinals. The remaining teams will advance to the semifinals where the third and fourth ranking teams having a twice-to-beat advantage. The semifinals and the finals will be a best-of-three series.

== Teams ==
Six professional teams will take part at the 2025 WMPBL season. The RK Hoops–Quezon City will make their debut while the rest of the team were 2025 Invitational Tournament participants. The Invitational Tournament had 14 teams, including amateur and collegiate sides.

- Discovery–Rizal Perlas
- New Zealand Blufire–Batangas Valkyries
- San Juan Lady Knights
- Tagaytay–Tol Patriots
- Solar–Pangasinan Home Suns
- RK Hoops–Quezon City

== Elimination round ==
Pos	Team	Pld	W	L	PF	PA	PD	GB	Qualification
1	New Zealand Blufire–Batangas Valkyries	10	8	2	855	633	+222	—	Semifinals
2	San Juan DN Steel Lady Knights	10	7	3	749	631	+118	1	Semifinals
3	Discovery–Rizal Perlas	10	6	4	735	630	+105	2	Twice-to-beat in quarterfinals
4	Tagaytay 'Tol Patriots	10	4 (Note: Tagaytay wins tiebreaker over Pangasinan based on head-to-head aggregate (155–149).)	6	679	721	−42	4	Twice-to-beat in quarterfinals
5	Solar–Pangasinan Home Suns	10	4	6	693	742	−49	4	Twice-to-win in quarterfinals
6	RK Hoops–Quezon City	10	1	9	498	852	−354	7	Twice-to-win in quarterfinals

Rules for classification: 1) Wins; 2a) If two teams are tied, head-to-head match-up and aggregate; 2b) If three or more teams are tied, head-to-head point differential; 3) overall point differential; 4) coin toss.

=== Results ===
Team	Game									
Team	1	2	3	4	5	6	7	8	9	10
Batangas (BTG)	TAG; 86–56	RZL; 101–87	QC; 99–45	SJ; 71–74	PGS; 100–61	SJ; 72–74	TAG; 75–66	QC; 101–47	PGS; 78–54	RZL; 72–69
Pangasinan (PGS)	QC; 68–71	RZL; 77–63	TAG; 79–73	SJ; 86–83*	BTG; 61–100	TAG; 70–82	RZL; 58–70	SJ; 58–72	BTG; 54–78	QC; 82–50
Quezon City (QC)	PGS; 71–68	SJ; 47–85	BTG; 45–99	RZL; 39–82	TAG; 63–91	SJ; 35–92	TAG; 56–72	BTG; 47–101	RZL; 45–80	PGS; 50–82
Rizal (RZL)	PGS; 63–77	BTG; 87–101	QC; 82–39	TAG; 79–60	SJ; 81–59	TAG; 66–56	PGS; 70–58	SJ; 58–63	QC; 80–45	BTG; 69–72
San Juan (SJ)	QC; 85–47	TAG; 76–46	BTG; 74–71	PGS; 83–86*	RZL; 59–81	BTG; 74–72	QC; 92–35	PGS; 72–58	RZL; 63–58	TAG; 71–77
Tagaytay (TAG)	BTG; 56–86	SJ; 46–76	PGS; 73–79	RZL; 60–79	QC; 91–63	PGS; 82–70	RZL; 56–66	BTG; 66–75	QC; 72–56	SJ; 77–71

Legend: Blue = win; Red = loss; Matches with lighter background shading were decided after overtime. (*) Number of asterisks denotes number of overtime periods

== Playoffs ==
Teams in bold advanced to the next round. Teams in italics have twice-to-beat advantage for the series.

Quarterfinals
(4 – twice-to-beat)
4	**Tagaytay**	**81**
5	Pangasinan	76
(3 – twice-to-beat)
3	**Rizal**	**90**
6	Quezon City	52

Semifinals (best-of-three)
1	**Batangas**	**2**
4	Tagaytay	0
2	San Juan	0
3	**Rizal**	**2**

Finals (best-of-three)
1	**Batangas**	2
3	Rizal	0

=== Finals ===
November 12

Report

**New Zealand Blufire–Batangas Valkyries** **98**, Discovery–Rizal Perlas 87

Villar Coliseum, Las Piñas

November 16

Report

**New Zealand Blufire–Batangas Valkyries** **79**, Discovery–Rizal Perlas 77
**New Zealand wins series, 2–0**

Enderun Gym, Taguig

== Notable events ==
- August 24 – Stefanie Berberabe becomes the first female player to record a quadruple-double statistics in women's professional basketball history after making 20 points, 15 rebounds, 10 assists, and 10 steals.
