= 2025 WMPBL Invitational Tournament =

Launch tournament of the Women's MPBL

Tournament details
- Country: Philippines
- Dates: January 19 – April 23, 2025
- Teams: 14
- TV partner: IBC

Final positions
- Champions: Pilipinas Aguilas
- Runners-up: UST Growling Tigresses

Awards
- MVP: Afril Bernardino (Navy)

The WMPBL Invitational Tournament was a tournament that serves as the launch event of the Women's Maharlika Pilipinas Basketball League (WMPBL). The tournament featured fourteen teams and ran from January 19 to April 23, 2025.

== Background ==
In October 2024, seven years after the founding of the Maharlika Pilipinas Basketball League, league founder Manny Pacquiao established the women's MPBL together with commissioner Haydee Ong. As preparation for the league's full launch in mid-2025, it will host an invitational tournament similar to its men's counterpart.

== Format ==
Fourteen teams will compete in the tournament and were divided into two groups: Group A and Group B. Each team played one game against each team from the opposing group, for a total of seven games for each team. At the end of the elimination round, the top four teams in each group will advance to the playoffs. Tiebreakers are broken by point differential as per FIBA rules.

The top four teams from each group advanced to the playoffs with the two gaining a twice-to-beat advantage in the quarterfinals. The semifinals are a knockout single-game playoffs and the finals was a best-of-three series. In the quarterfinals and semifinals, teams will be playing against teams from the same group.

=== Roster regulations ===
For this tournament only, the minimum age requirement for all players is 18 years of age. Each team will also be able to field up to one import and two Filipino-foreigner players during the tournament. In addition, each team is limited to two players who play for the Philippine national team.

== Playing venues ==
Elimination round		Elimination round and Quarterfinals
Quadricentennial Pavilion; Sampaloc, Manila	Ynares Sports Arena; Pasig	Enderun Colleges; Taguig
Capacity: 5,792	Capacity: 3,000	Capacity: N/A
Quarterfinals	Finals	
New Era Gymnasium; Quezon City	Rizal Memorial Coliseum; Manila	Ninoy Aquino Stadium; Manila
Capacity: N/A	Capacity: 6,100	Capacity: 6,000

== Elimination round ==
The elimination round began on January 19, 2025, at the Quadricentennial Pavilion in Sampaloc, Manila, home of the UST Growling Tigresses.

=== Group A ===
==== Standings ====
Pos	Team	Pld	W	L	PF	PA	PD	GB	
1	Discovery Perlas	7	6	1	555	446	+109	—	Twice-to-beat in quarterfinals
2	Pilipinas Aguilas	7	5	2	561	408	+153	1	Twice-to-beat in quarterfinals
3	FEU Lady Tamaraws	7	2	5	446	454	−8	4	Twice-to-win in quarterfinals
4	Cavite 'Tol Patriots	7	2	5	416	461	−45	4	Twice-to-win in quarterfinals
5	PSP Gymers	7	1	6	374	514	−140	5	
6	CEU Lady Scorpions	7	1	6	367	578	−211	5	
7	Solar Home Suns	7	1	6	312	597	−285	5	

Source: Standings via Genius Sports (MPBL)

==== Results ====
Team	Game						
Team	1	2	3	4	5	6	7
Cavite 'Tol Patriots (CAV)	NZB; 51–54	PHN; 57–70	IMS; 87–48	SJ; 58–62	EZJ; 69–54	UST; 46–96	GAL; 48–77
CEU Lady Scorpions (CEU)	GAL; 46–102	EZJ; 68–65	NZB; 48–91	UST; 33–105	IMS; 78–79	SJ; 42–43	PHN; 52–93
Discovery Perlas (DIS)	UST; 67–82	IMS; 108–60	PHN; 80–71	EZJ; 88–45	GAL; 74–67	NZB; 59–56	SJ; 79–65
FEU Lady Tamaraws (FEU)	EZJ; 69–45	SJ; 37–44	PHN; 61–76	NZB; 68–70	IMS; 91–60	GAL; 46–63	UST; 74–96
Pilipinas Aguilas (PIL)	NZB; 66–55	PHN; 65–72	SJ; 78–52	EZJ; 113–55	UST; 82–75	IMS; 99–36	GAL; 58–63
PSP Gymers (PSP)	IMS; 70–73	UST; 32–75	NZB; 38–71	GAL; 39–74	PHN; 35–68	EZJ; 79–67	SJ; 81–86*
Solar Home Suns (SOL)	SJ; 39–75	GAL; 20–72	PHN; 46–94	IMS; 57–52	UST; 43–95	NZB; 41–107	EZJ; 66–77

Source: Schedule via Genius Sports (MPBL)
Legend: Blue = win; Red = loss; Matches with lighter background shading were decided after overtime. (*) Number of asterisks denotes number of overtime periods

==== Group B ====
Pos	Team	Pld	W	L	PF	PA	PD	GB	
1	UST Growling Tigresses	7	6	1	624	377	+247	—	Twice-to-beat in quarterfinals
2	Galeries Tower Manila	7	6	1	518	331	+187	—	Twice-to-beat in quarterfinals
3	Philippine Navy Lady Sailors	7	6	1	544	386	+158	—	Twice-to-win in quarterfinals
4	New Zealand Bluefire Valkyries	7	5	2	504	371	+133	1	Twice-to-win in quarterfinals
5	San Juan Lady Knights	7	5	2	427	414	+13	1	
6	Imus Lady Magdalo	7	2	5	437	590	−153	4	
7	EZ Jersey–Relentless Basketball	7	1	6	408	552	−144	5	

Source: Standings via Genius Sports (MPBL)

==== Results ====
Team	Game						
Team	1	2	3	4	5	6	7
EZ Jersey–Relentless Basketball (EZJ)	FEU; 45–69	CEU; 65–68	PIL; 55–113	DIS; 45–88	CAV; 54–69	PSP; 67–79	SOL; 77–66
Galeries Tower Manila (GAL)	CEU; 102–46	SOL; 72–20	PSP; 74–39	DIS; 67–74	FEU; 63–46	PIL; 63–58	CAV; 77–48
Imus Lady Magdalo (IMS)	PSP; 73–70	DIS; 60–108	CAV; 48–87	SOL; 52–57	CEU; 79–78	FEU; 60–91	PIL; 36–99
New Zealand Bluefire Valkyries (NZB)	CAV; 54–51	PIL; 55–66	PSP; 71–38	CEU; 91–48	FEU; 70–68	DIS; 56–59	SOL; 107–41
Philippine Navy Lady Sailors (PHN)	CAV; 70–57	PIL; 72–65	DIS; 71–80	SOL; 94–46	FEU; 76–61	PSP; 68–35	CEU; 93–52
San Juan Lady Knights (SJ)	SOL; 75–39	FEU; 44–37	PIL; 52–78	CAV; 62–58	CEU; 43–42	DIS; 65–79	DIS; 86–81*
UST Growling Tigresses (UST)	DIS; 82–67	PSP; 75–32	CEU; 105–33	PIL; 75–82	SOL; 95–43	CAV; 96–46	FEU; 96–74

Source: Schedule via Genius Sports (MPBL)
Legend: Blue = win; Red = loss; Matches with lighter background shading were decided after overtime. (*) Number of asterisks denotes number of overtime periods

== Playoffs ==
Teams in bold advanced to the next round. Teams in italics have twice-to-beat advantage for the series.

Quarterfinals
(A1 twice-to-beat)
A1	**Discovery**	**93**
A4	Cavite	58
(A2 twice-to-beat)
A2	**Aguilas**	**78**
A3	FEU	49
(B1 twice-to-beat)
B1	**UST**	**63**
B4	New Zealand	54
(B2 twice-to-beat)
B2	**Galleries Tower**	43	**80**
B3	Philippine Navy	**56**	67

Semifinals (knockout)
A1	Discovery	48
A2	**Aguilas**	**65**
B1	**UST**	**67**
B2	Galleries Tower	54

Finals (best-of-three)
A2	**Aguilas**	**2**
B1	UST	1

=== Quarterfinals ===
==== (A1) Discovery vs. (A4) Cavite ====
April 6

Report

**Discovery Perlas** **93**, Cavite 'Tol Patriots 58
**Discovery wins series in one game**

New Era Gym, Quezon City

==== (A2) Aguilas vs. (A3) FEU ====
April 6

Report

**Pilipinas Aguilas** **93**, FEU Lady Tamaraws 58
**Aguilas wins series in one game**

New Era Gym, Quezon City

==== (B1) UST vs. (B4) New Zealand ====
April 6

Report

**UST Growling Tigresses** **63**, New Zealand Bluefire Valkyries 54
**UST wins series in one game**

New Era Gym, Quezon City

==== (B2) Galeries Tower vs. (B3) Philippine Navy ====
April 6

Report

Galeries Tower Manila 43, **Philippine Navy Lady Sailors** **56**

New Era Gym, Quezon City

April 9

Report

Philippine Navy Lady Sailors 67, **Galeries Tower Manila** **80**
**Galleries Tower wins series in two games**

Enderun Gym, Taguig

=== Semifinals ===
April 13

Report

**UST Growling Tigresses** **67**, Galleries Tower Manila 54

Rizal Memorial Coliseum, Manila

April 13

Report

Discovery Perlas 48, **Pilipinas Aguilas** **65**

Rizal Memorial Coliseum, Manila

=== Finals ===
April 16

Report

**Pilipinas Aguilas** **95**, UST Growling Tigresses 86 (OT)

Rizal Memorial Coliseum, Manila

April 20

Report

**UST Growling Tigresses** **69**, Pilipinas Aguilas 64

Ninoy Aquino Stadium, Manila

April 23

Report

**Pilipinas Aguilas** **54**, UST Growling Tigresses 45
**Aguilas wins series, 2–1**

Ninoy Aquino Stadium, Manila

== Media ==
The league's games was broadcast by IBC on television. The network had previously broadcast the Maharlika Pilipinas men's leaguem specifically the 2021 MPBL Invitational. The league streamed the games on its social media platforms.
