= NU Lady Bulldogs basketball =

NU Lady Bulldogs
- University: National University
- Head coach: D.A. Olan (2nd season)
- Location: Sampaloc, Manila
- Nickname: Lady Bulldogs
- Colors: Blue and Gold

UAAP Champion (8)
- 2014; 2015; 2016; 2017; 2018; 2019; 2022; 2024

The NU Lady Bulldogs are the collegiate women's basketball team of the National University (NU), which play in the University Athletic Association of the Philippines (UAAP), the premiere sports league in the country.

== History ==
The NU Lady Bulldogs competes in the University Athletic Association of the Philippines (UAAP).

They had their most successful results in the 2010s. Dioceldo Sy of Ever Bilena became the Lady Bulldog's sports patron in 2011. Sy in turn tapped Patrick Aquino as head coach in 2012. The Sy-sponsored staff had to contend with the women's basketball in a landscape where the sport is viewed as a men's sport and the draw of more prestigious UAAP schools in player recruitment. Aquino was allowed to leave his role to focus on coaching the Philippine women's national team in 2022.

The Lady Bulldogs under Aquino would reach their first ever finals in 2013 during Season 76. The Lady Bulldogs went on to win seven consecutive titles starting from the succeeding Season 77 to Season 85 (2014–22). This matched the feat of the Robert Jaworski-led University of the East Red Warriors men's team from 1965 to 1971 Coach Aris Dimaunahan won the seventh and last title of that streak.

However the Lady Bulldogs' streak was ended in 2023 by the UST Tigresses in the finals of Season 86 It also ended a 108-game winning streak.

== Season-by-season records ==
Season	League	Elimination round						Playoffs			
Season	League	Pos	GP	W	L	PCT	GB	GP	W	L	Results
2006	UAAP	7th/7	12	0	12	.000	9	Did not qualify			
2007	UAAP	8th/8	14	1	13	.071	11	Did not qualify			
2008	UAAP	8th/8	14	1	13	.071	12	Did not qualify			
2009	UAAP	7th/8	14	3	11	214	10	Did not qualify			
2010	UAAP	5th/8	14	4	10	.286	9	Did not qualify			
2011	UAAP	6th/8	14	4	10	.286	8	Did not qualify			
2012	UAAP	5th/8	14	7	7	.500	7	1	0	1	Lost 4th seed playoff vs Ateneo
2013	UAAP	1st/8	14	12	2	.857	—	4	2	2	Lost finals vs La Salle
2014	UAAP	1st/8	14	14	0	1.000	—	2	2	0	Won finals vs FEU
2015	UAAP	1st/8	14	14	0	1.000	—	2	2	0	Won finals vs Ateneo
2016	UAAP	1st/8	14	14	0	1.000	—	2	2	0	Won finals vs La Salle
2017	UAAP	1st/8	14	14	0	1.000	—	2	2	0	Won finals vs UE
2018	UAAP	1st/8	14	14	0	1.000	—	2	2	0	Won finals vs FEU
2019	UAAP	1st/8	14	14	0	1.000	—	2	2	0	Won finals vs UST
2020 (Note: Season cancelled due to the COVID-19 pandemic.)	UAAP	Season cancelled									
2021	UAAP	Season cancelled									
2022	UAAP	1st/8	14	13	1	.929	—	3	3	0	Won finals vs La Salle
2023	UAAP	1st/8	14	13	1	.929	—	4	2	2	Lost finals vs UST
2024	UAAP	1st/8	14	14	0	1.000	—	3	2	1	Won finals vs UST

== Team awards ==
=== UAAP ===
Season	Tournament	Title	Ref			
Season	Tournament	Title	Ref	2013	UAAP Season 76	Runners up
2014	UAAP Season 77	Champions				
2015	UAAP Season 78	Champions				
2016	UAAP Season 79	Champions				
2017	UAAP Season 80	Champions				
2018	UAAP Season 81	Champions				
2019	UAAP Season 82	Champions				
2022	UAAP Season 85	Champions				
2023	UAAP Season 86	Runners up				
2024	UAAP Season 87	Champions				
2025	UAAP Season 88	Runners up				

== Head coaches ==
- Benjie Navarro (2005–2009)
- Leo Pujante (2010–2011)
- Patrick Aquino (2012–2022)
- Aris Dimaunahan (2022–2025)
- D.A. Olan (2025–present)

== Notable players ==
- Jack Animam
- Afril Bernardino
- Ana Thea Cenarosa
- Camille Clarin
