= Women's Maharlika Pilipinas Basketball League =

Professional women's basketball league in the Philippines

Women's Maharlika Pilipinas Basketball League (WMPBL)
- Most recent season or competition: 2026 WMPBL season
- Sport: Basketball
- Founded: November 24, 2024; 21 months ago
- Founder: Manny Pacquiao
- Commissioner: Mau Belen
- Motto: Ang Liga Ng Bawat Pilipina lit. 'The League of Every Filipina'
- No. of teams: 6
- Country: Philippines
- Headquarters: Pasig
- Continent: FIBA Asia (Asia)
- Most recent champion: Akari Sparks Rizal (1st title)
- Most titles: three teams (1 title each)
- Broadcaster: Solar Sports

The Women's Maharlika Pilipinas Basketball League (WMPBL) is a women's professional basketball league in the Philippines consisting of six teams. It serves as the women's counterpart of the Maharlika Pilipinas Basketball League (MPBL).

The league launched in November 2024 by boxing legend and former Senator Manny Pacquiao and is the fourth league to bear the Maharlika Pilipinas name. The WMPBL first began play as an amateur league in January 2025 with an invitational tournament. The league then turned pro in April, becoming the second women's basketball league in the country to do so, after the Women's National Basketball League. Its first pro season then began in June.

== History ==
=== Previous attempts ===
There have been multiple attempts at establishing a women's professional basketball league in the Philippines prior to the WMPBL. The first was the Women's Philippine Basketball League, which ran from 1998 to 1999, and again in 2008. The Pinay Ballers League followed in 2014 which gained the support of the Philippine Sports Commission. Additionally, the Philippine Basketball Association (PBA) hosted women's 3x3 basketball on two separate occasions, the first from 2015 to 2016 and the second in 2024.

The first of these leagues to gain professional status was the Women's National Basketball League, which was established in 2019 and turned professional a year later. At the time of the WMPBL's establishment, its most recent season was held in 2022.

=== Establishment and launch ===
Following the success of the Maharlika Pilipinas Basketball League, Manny Pacquiao expanded on its grassroots format by creating new leagues under the Maharlika Pilipinas name. After the launch of the Junior MPBL in June 2023, Pacquiao founded the Maharlika Pilipinas Volleyball Association in October that year, the first to feature female athletes. Reports of a direct women's counterpart were first published in October 2024, when Haydee Ong, head coach of the UST Growling Tigresses basketball team, accepted an offer to become the league's inaugural commissioner.

The league formally launched on November 24, 2024 at the Winford Hotel in Manila, with Ong stating that "women's basketball now has evolved into a more exciting brand compared to the previous era", alluding to the Caitlin Clark effect seen in the United States. Although the league initially targeted eight to ten teams for the start of league play, fourteen ended up turning in. The league would begin as an amateur league for the Invitational Tournament before transitioning to professional status by mid-2025, during which it is expected to run its first full season.

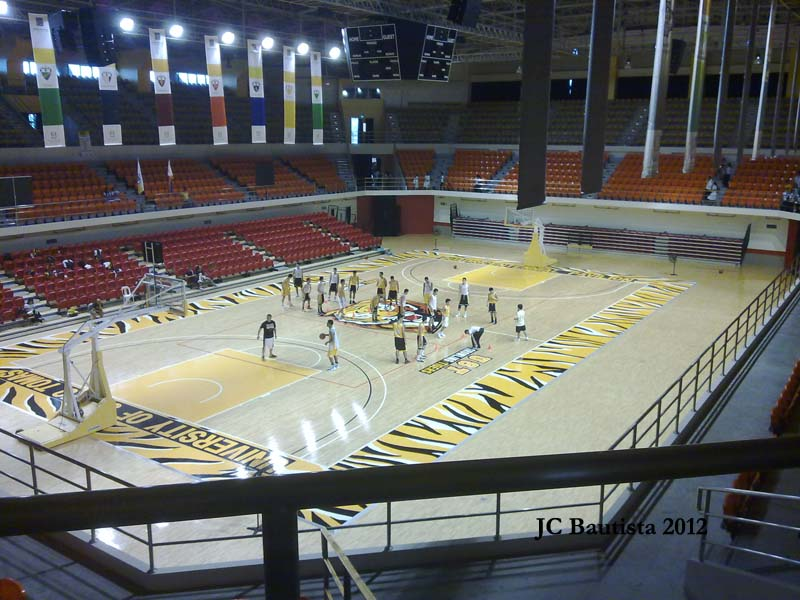
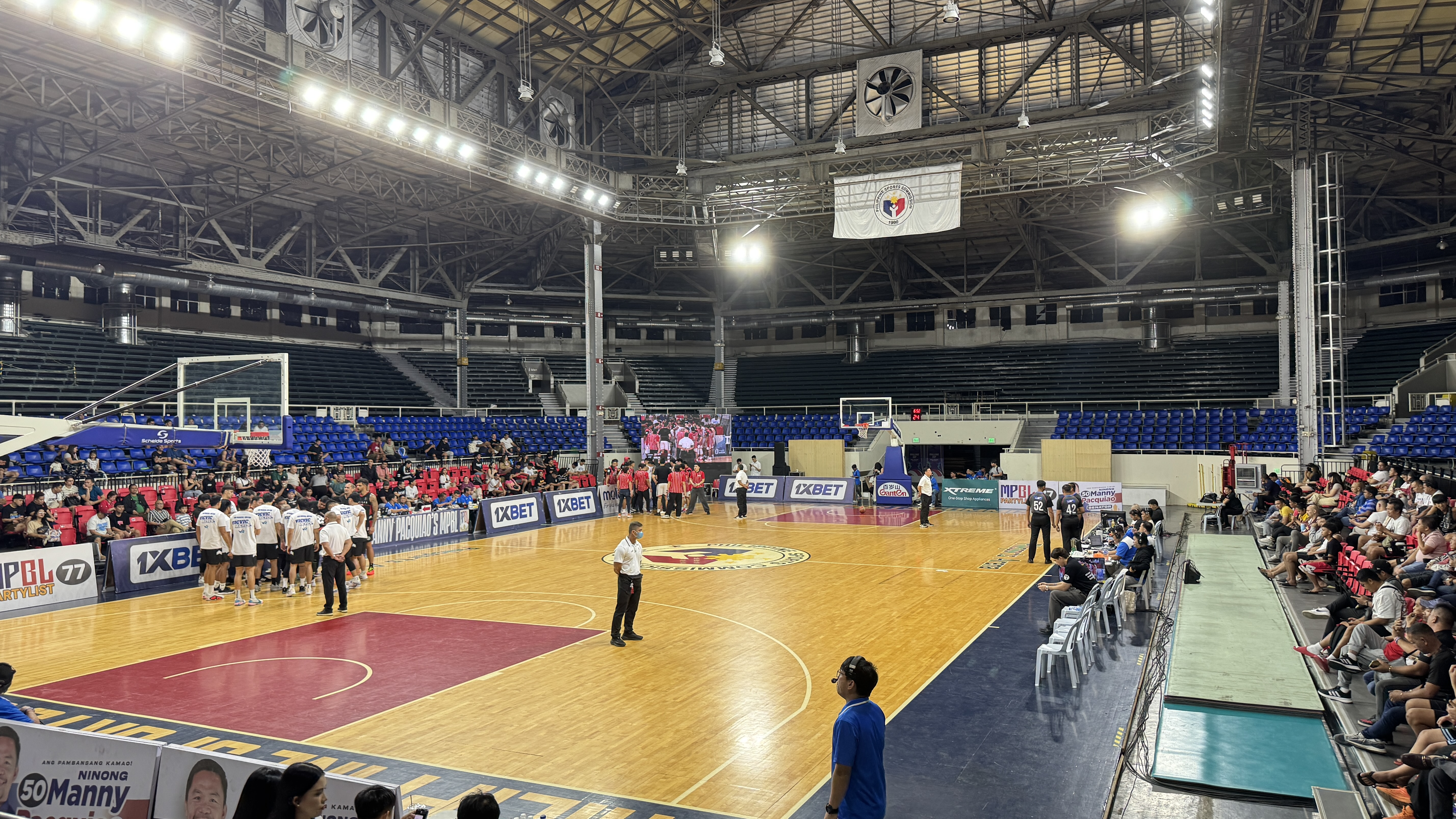
Quadricentennial Pavilion (left) hosted the WMPBL's first games during the 2025 Invitational on January 19. Rizal Memorial Coliseum (right) hosted the league's first games as a pro league on June 29, 2025.

The league began play with the Invitational Tournament on January 19, 2025 at the Quadricentennial Pavilion on the campus of the University of Santo Tomas in Sampaloc, Manila. It concluded on April 23 with the Pilipinas Aguilas defeating the UST Growling Tigresses. The next day, the league announced its transition to a professional league.

The league's first professional season started on June 29, 2025 at the Rizal Memorial Coliseum. Five out of fourteen Invitational teams remained, now with a location attached to each. An expansion team, RK Hoops–Quezon City was also added, bringing the league to six teams. New Zealand Bluefire-Batangas won the season.

Ahead of the second professional season in 2026, key officials of the WMPBL resigned from their role ledy by Haydee Ong due to "irreconciliable differences".

== Teams ==
The inaugural professional WMPBL season features six teams, all based in Luzon. Calabarzon has the most teams out of any region with three followed by Metro Manila with two and the Ilocos Region with one.

=== Current teams ===
Overview of WMPBL teams
Team	Location	Joined	Head coach
Akari Sparks	Rizal	2025	Derrick Pumaren
Batangas New Zealand Bluefire	Batangas	2025	Pocholo Villanueva
Biñan Tatak Gel Angels	Biñan, Laguna	2026	Jack Azcueta
Caloocan Lady Kankaloo	Caloocan	2026	JP Bernal
RK Hoops–Quezon City	Quezon City	2025	Jon Cobarrubias
Pasig Queenpin	Pasig	2026	Kyle Umengan

=== Future teams ===
Team	Location	Joining
Parañaque WMPBL team	Parañaque	2027

=== Invitational teams ===
The following teams took part in the Invitational tournament, preceding the 2025 season.

Team	Affiliation
CEU Lady Scorpions	Centro Escolar University
EZ Jersey–Relentless	EZ Jersey; Relentless Basketball
FEU Lady Tamaraws	Far Eastern University
Galeries Tower Skyrisers	Galeries Tower
Imus Lady Magdalo	Imus, Cavite
Philippine Navy Lady Sailors	Philippine Navy
Pilipinas Aguilas	None
PSP Gymers	PSP Fitness Gym
UST Growling Tigresses	University of Santo Tomas

=== Former teams ===
Team	Locality	First season	Last season
Pangasinan Solar Home Suns	Pangasinan	2025	2025
San Juan DN Steel Lady Knights	San Juan	2025	2025
Tagaytay 'Tol Patriots	Tagaytay, Cavite	2025	2025

== Roster regulations ==
All players on team rosters must be at least 21 years old. Teams will also be able to have one import and up to two Filipino-foreigner players. In addition, each team is limited to two players who play for the Philippines women's national basketball team.

== Season format ==
=== 2025 ===
All six teams compete in a double round-robin tournament. Each team plays two games against all other teams, for a total of ten games. All teams automatically advance to the playoffs, but their ranking in the regular season standings determine where their placement in the bracket. The top two teams will start at the semifinals while the third- and fourth-place teams will hold twice-to-beat advantage over the fifth- and sixth-place teams in the quarterfinals. The semifinals and finals are best-of-three series.

=== Invitational ===
The league divides the teams into two groups: Group A and Group B. Each team will play one game against each team from the opposing group, for a total of seven games for each team. The top four teams in each group will advance to the playoffs, with the top two earning twice-to-beat advantage in the quarterfinals. The semifinals and finals will both be best-of-three series.

== Championships ==
Team	Win	Loss	Total	Year(s) won	Year(s) lost
Batangas New Zealand Bluefire	1	1	2	2025	2026
Pilipinas Aguilas	1	0	1	2025 (Inv.)	—
Akari Sparks Rizal	1	0	1	2026	—
Discovery–Perlas	0	1	1	—	2025
UST Growling Tigresses	0	1	1	—	2025 (Inv.)

== Media ==
The WMPBL's current broadcast partner is Solar Entertainment Corporation under Solar Sports. The network currently airs the games on Wednesdays and Sundays. Similar to other Maharlika Pilipinas leagues, all games are also streamed on the league's social media channels. During the Invitational Tournament, the league's broadcast partner was the Intercontinental Broadcasting Corporation (IBC), which previously broadcast the 2021 MPBL Invitational.

== Commissioners ==
No.	Commissioner	Tenure	
No.	Commissioner	From	To
1	Haydee Ong	October 2024	April 5, 2026
2	Mau Belen	April 2026	incumbent

== See also ==
- Maharlika Pilipinas Basketball League – the league's men's counterpart
- Maharlika Pilipinas Volleyball Association – the league's volleyball counterpart
