= Myanmar women's national basketball team =

Women national basketball team representing Myanmar

Myanmar
- FIBA ranking: 61 ▼3 (18 March 2026)
- Joined FIBA: 1953
- FIBA zone: FIBA Asia
- National federation: Myanmar Basketball Federation

Asia Cup
- Appearances: 17

The Myanmar women's national basketball team represents Myanmar in international women's basketball.

In August 2017, the team landed in 6th place after losing to all in the 2017 SEA Games women's basketball match at the MABA Stadium in Kuala Lumpur.

== Competitions ==
=== FIBA Women's Basketball World Cup ===
Yet to qualify

=== FIBA Women's Asia Cup ===
Asian Cup Record
| Year | Division A | | | | Division B | | | |
| Year | Position | Pld | W | L | Position | Pld | W | L |
|---|---|---|---|---|---|---|---|---|
| (South Korea) 1965 | did not qualify | | | | No Division B / Level II | | | |
| (Taiwan) 1968 | 4th place | 7 | 4 | 3 | No Division B / Level II | | | |
| (Malaysia) 1970 | 6th place | 9 | 4 | 5 | No Division B / Level II | | | |
| (Taiwan) 1972 | 3rd place | 6 | 3 | 3 | No Division B / Level II | | | |
| (South Korea) 1974 | did not qualify | | | | No Division B / Level II | | | |
| (Hong Kong) 1976 | did not qualify | | | | No Division B / Level II | | | |
| (Malaysia) 1978 | did not qualify | | | | No Division B / Level II | | | |
| (Hong Kong) 1980 | 5th place | 6 | 2 | 4 | No Division B / Level II | | | |
| (Japan) 1982 | did not qualify | | | | No Division B / Level II | | | |
| (China) 1984 | did not qualify | | | | No Division B / Level II | | | |
| (Malaysia) 1986 | 5th place | 7 | 3 | 4 | No Division B / Level II | | | |
| (Hong Kong) 1988 | 7th place | 8 | 2 | 6 | No Division B / Level II | | | |
| (Singapore) 1990 | did not qualify | | | | did not qualify | | | |
| (South Korea) 1992 | did not qualify | | | | No Division B / Level II | | | |
| (Japan) 1994 | 8th place | Level II | | | 3rd place | 5 | 2 | 3 |
| (Japan) 1995 | 7th place | Level II | | | 1st place | 5 | 5 | 0 |
| (Thailand) 1997 | 5th place | 5 | 1 | 4 | Level I | | | |
| (Japan) 1999 | 5th place | 4 | 0 | 4 | Level I | | | |
| (Thailand) 2001 | 5th place | 4 | 0 | 4 | Level I | | | |
| (Japan) 2004 | 5th place | 4 | 0 | 4 | Level I | | | |
| (China) 2005 | 5th place | 4 | 0 | 4 | Level I | | | |
| (South Korea) 2007 | 5th place | 6 | 2 | 4 | Level I | | | |
| (India) 2009 | 5th place | 6 | 1 | 5 | Level I | | | |
| (Japan) 2011 | suspended | | | | | | | |
| (Thailand) 2013 | 7th place | Level II | | | 1st place | 6 | 5 | 1 |
| (China) 2015 | 5th place | 6 | 1 | 5 | Level I | | | |
| (India) 2017 | did not qualify | | | | | | | |
| (India) 2019 | did not qualify | | | | | | | |
| (Jordan) 2021 | did not qualify | | | | | | | |
| (Australia) 2023 | did not qualify | | | | | | | |
| (China) 2025 | did not qualify | | | | | | | |
| (Philippines) 2027 | did not qualify | | | | | | | |
| Total | | 82 | 23 | 59 | | 16 | 12 | 4 |

=== SEABA Championship for Women ===
Southeast Asian Championship Record
| Year | Position | Pld | W | L |
|---|---|---|---|---|
| (Thailand) 1995 | 1st place | | | |
| (Thailand) 1997 | 1st place | | | |
| (Malaysia) 1999 | 2nd place | | | |
| (Thailand) 2002 | 1st place | | | |
| (Singapore) 2004 | 2nd place | | | |
| (Thailand) 2007 | 1st place | 6 | 5 | 1 |
| (Philippines) 2010 | 2nd place | 5 | 3 | 2 |
| (Indonesia) 2014 | did not participate | | | |
| (Malaysia) 2016 | 5th place | 6 | 2 | 4 |
| Total | 4 gold, 3 silver | 10–7 (incomplete) | | |

=== Olympic Games ===
Yet to qualify

=== Asian Games ===
Asian Games Record
| Year | Position | Pld | W | L |
|---|---|---|---|---|
| (Iran) 1974 | did not qualify | | | |
| (Thailand) 1978 | 4th place | 4 | 1 | 3 |
| (India) 1982 | did not qualify | | | |
| (South Korea) 1986 | did not qualify | | | |
| (China) 1990 | 6th place | 5 | 0 | 5 |
| (Japan) 1994 | 6th place | 5 | 0 | 5 |
| (Thailand) 1998 | 7th place | 3 | 0 | 3 |
| (South Korea) 2002 | did not qualify | | | |
| (Qatar) 2006 | 5th place | 3 | 1 | 2 |
| (China) 2010 | 7th place | 3 | 1 | 2 |
| (South Korea) 2014 | 6th place | 5 | 0 | 5 |
| (Indonesia) 2018 | 6th place | 7 | 3 | 4 |
| (China) 2022 | 11th place | 3 | 0 | 3 |
| (Japan) 2026 | To be determined | | | |
| Total | | 38 | 6 | 32 |

=== Southeast Asian Games ===
Southeast Asian Games Record
| Year | Position | Pld | W | L |
|---|---|---|---|---|
| (Malaysia) 1977 | 2nd place | 4 | 2 | 1 |
| (Indonesia) 1979 | 2nd place | - | - | - |
| (Philippines) 1981 | 3rd place | 5 | 3 | 2 |
| (Singapore) 1983 | 4th place | 4 | 1 | 3 |
| (Thailand) 1985 | 4th | - | - | - |
| (Indonesia) 1987 | 2nd place | - | - | - |
| (Malaysia) 1989 | 1st place | 4 | 4 | 0 |
| (Philippines) 1991 | 1st place | 6 | 6 | 0 |
| (Singapore) 1993 | 2nd place | - | - | - |
| (Thailand) 1995 | 1st place | 6 | 6 | 0 |
| (Indonesia) 1997 | 2nd place | 5 | 3 | 2 |
| (Brunei) 1999 | Not Held | | | |
| (Malaysia) 2001 | 2nd place | 4 | 3 | 1 |
| (Vietnam) 2003 | 4th place | 5 | 3 | 2 |
| (Philippines) 2005 | Not Held | | | |
| (Thailand) 2007 | 2nd place | 3 | 2 | 1 |
| (Laos) 2009 | Not held | | | |
| (Indonesia) 2011 | 1st place | 4 | 3 | 1 |
| (Myanmar) 2013 | 1st place | 4 | 4 | 0 |
| (Singapore) 2015 | 3rd place | 5 | 3 | 2 |
| (Malaysia) 2017 | 2nd place | 6 | 4 | 2 |
| (Philippines) 2019 | 2nd place | 3 | 2 | 1 |
| (Vietnam) 2021 | 4th place | 5 | 2 | 3 |
| (Cambodia) 2023 | 5th place | 6 | 2 | 4 |
| Total | 5 gold, 9 silver, 2 bronze | 51–21 (incomplete) | | |

=== Other Tournaments ===
Other Tournaments
| Year | Position | Pld | W | L |
|---|---|---|---|---|
| (Taiwan) 2016 William Jones Cup | 6th place | 5 | 0 | 5 |

== Roster ==
At the 2019 SEA Games:

Thailand National Basketball Team roster
Players
Coaches

| Pos. | No. | Name | Age – Date of birth | Height | Club | Ctr. |
|---|---|---|---|---|---|---|
| G | 3 | Tiffany Bias | 27 – 2 May 1992 | 1.72 m (5 ft 8 in) | New York Liberty | (United States) |
| C | 6 | Penphan Yothanan | 36 – 29 December 1982 | 1.70 m (5 ft 7 in) | Chulalongkorn University | (Thailand) |
| G | 7 | Pimchosita Supyen | 22 – 4 July 1997 | 1.63 m (5 ft 4 in) | Shoot It Dragon | (Thailand) |
| F | 8 | Supavadee Kunchuan | 27 – 4 December 1992 | 1.78 m (5 ft 10 in) | Shoot It Dragon | (Thailand) |
| G | 9 | Suree Phromrat | 28 – 17 July 1991 | 1.58 m (5 ft 2 in) | Chulalongkorn University | (Thailand) |
| G/F | 11 | Wantanee Sangmanee | 26 – 11 September 1993 | 1.76 m (5 ft 9 in) | Sripatum University | (Thailand) |
| F | 13 | Atchara Kaichaiyapoom | 27 – 11 February 1992 | 1.78 m (5 ft 10 in) | Bangkok Bank | (Thailand) |
| F | 28 | Supira Klunbut | 25 – 8 July 1994 | 1.77 m (5 ft 10 in) | Shoot It Dragon | (Thailand) |
| F/C | 29 | Rattiyakorn Udomsuk | 20 – 20 June 1999 | 1.74 m (5 ft 9 in) | Dhurakij Pundit University | (Thailand) |
| C | 38 | Kloyjai Phetsaenkha | 24 – 27 March 1995 | 1.80 m (5 ft 11 in) | Dhurakij Pundit University | (Thailand) |
| G | 86 | Nutchavarin Buapa | 26 – 5 January 1993 | 1.69 m (5 ft 7 in) | Chulalongkorn University | (Thailand) |
| F | 91 | Thidaporn Maihom | 26 – 9 April 1993 | 1.70 m (5 ft 7 in) |

Head coach

- (Thailand) Apaipong Netsiriswan

Assistant coach(es)

- (Thailand) Kanchana Prasanchaimontree
- (Thailand) Narumol Montee

Legend

- (C) Team captain
- Club field describes current pro club
- Age – describes age
  on 10 December 2019

== 3x3 team ==
At the 2021 FIBA 3x3 Women's Olympic Qualifying Tournament in Austria, Thailand replaced Turkmenistan into the main draw. They entered with some experience on the big stage having competed in the Women's Series two years ago and winning silver at the South East Asian Games 2019. They also reached the quarters of the Asia Cup 2019.

== See also ==
- Myanmar men's national basketball team
