= Indonesia women's national basketball team =

Indonesia
- FIBA ranking: 59 ▼2 (18 March 2026)
- Joined FIBA: 1953
- FIBA zone: FIBA Asia
- National federation: PERBASI
- Coach: Gitautas Kievinas

Asia Cup
- Appearances: 13
- Medals: None

SEABA Championship
- Appearances: 9
- Medals: Silver: 2014
Home	Away
Medal record
SEABA Championship
Silver medal – second place	2014 Semarang	Team
SEA Games
Gold medal – first place	2023 Phnom Penh	Team
Silver medal – second place	1991 Manila	Team
Silver medal – second place	2015 Singapore	Team
Silver medal – second place	2021 Hanoi	Team
Bronze medal – third place	1979 Jakarta	Team
Bronze medal – third place	1989 Kuala Lumpur	Team
Bronze medal – third place	1997 Jakarta	Team
Bronze medal – third place	2017 Kuala Lumpur	Team
Bronze medal – third place	2019 Philippines	Team

The Indonesia women's national basketball team (Indonesian: Tim Bola Basket Nasional Wanita Indonesia) is the women's national basketball team of Indonesia. The governing body of the team is the Indonesian Basketball Association (Indonesian: Persatuan Bola Basket Seluruh Indonesia, PERBASI).

== History ==
In August 2017, the team won the bronze medal at the 2017 SEA Games women's basketball tournament in the MABA Stadium in Kuala Lumpur.

In May 2023, the team won the gold medal for the first time at the 2023 SEA Games women's basketball tournament in the Morodok Techo National Sports Complex in Phnom Penh. Later in August 2023, the team would also win the 2023 FIBA Women's Asia Cup Division B by defeating Iran in the final. Thus won a promotion to the upcoming 2025 FIBA Women's Asia Cup Division A.

== Competitive record ==
=== Olympic Games ===
Olympic Games record
Year	Position	Pld	W	L
(Canada) 1976	Did not participate			
(Soviet Union) 1980	Boycotted			
(United States) 1984	Did not qualify			
(South Korea) 1988	Did not participate			
(Spain) 1992	Did not participate			
(United States) 1996	Did not qualify			
(Australia) 2000	Did not participate			
(Greece) 2004	Did not qualify			
(China) 2008	Did not participate			
(United Kingdom) 2012	Did not participate			
(Brazil) 2016	Did not qualify			
(Japan) 2020	Did not qualify			
(France) 2024	Did not qualify			
(United States) 2028	To be determined			
Total		0	0	0

=== FIBA Women's Basketball World Cup ===
FIBA World Cup record
Year	Position	Pld	W	L
(Chile) 1953	Did not participate			
(Brazil) 1957	Did not participate			
(Soviet Union) 1959	Did not participate			
(Peru) 1964	Did not participate			
(Czechoslovakia) 1967	Did not qualify			
(Brazil) 1971	Did not participate			
(Colombia) 1975	Did not participate			
(South Korea) 1979	Did not qualify			
(Brazil) 1983	Did not qualify			
(Soviet Union) 1986	Did not participate			
(Malaysia) 1990	Did not participate			
(Australia) 1994	Did not qualify			
(Germany) 1998	Did not participate			
(China) 2002	Did not participate			
(Brazil) 2006	Did not participate			
(Czech Republic) 2010	Did not qualify			
(Turkey) 2014	Did not qualify			
(Spain) 2018	Did not qualify			
(Australia) 2022	Did not qualify			
(Germany) 2026	Did not qualify			
(Japan) 2030	To be determined			
Total		0	0	0

=== FIBA Women's Asia Cup ===
FIBA Asia Cup record
Year	Division A				Division B			
Year	Position	Pld	W	L	Position	Pld	W	L
(South Korea) 1965	Did not qualify				No Division B / Level II			
(Taiwan) 1968	Did not qualify				No Division B / Level II			
(Malaysia) 1970	5th place	9	5	4	No Division B / Level II			
(Taiwan) 1972	4th place	6	1	5	No Division B / Level II			
(South Korea) 1974	Did not qualify				No Division B / Level II			
(Hong Kong) 1976	Did not qualify				No Division B / Level II			
(Malaysia) 1978	7th place	8	2	6	No Division B / Level II			
(Hong Kong) 1980	9th place	5	2	3	No Division B / Level II			
(Japan) 1982	Did not qualify				No Division B / Level II			
(China) 1984	Did not qualify				No Division B / Level II			
(Malaysia) 1986	10th place	6	0	6	No Division B / Level II			
(Hong Kong) 1988	Did not qualify				No Division B / Level II			
(Singapore) 1990	9th place	Level II			4th place	5	2	3
(South Korea) 1992	Did not qualify				No Division B / Level II			
(Japan) 1994	11th place	Level II			6th place	5	0	5
(Japan) 1995	12th place	Level II			6th place	5	0	5
(Thailand) 1997	11th place	Level II			5th place	4	2	2
(Japan) 1999	Did not qualify				Did not qualify			
(Thailand) 2001	Did not qualify				Did not qualify			
(Japan) 2004	Did not qualify				Did not qualify			
(China) 2005	Did not qualify				Did not qualify			
(South Korea) 2007	Did not qualify				Did not qualify			
(India) 2009	Did not qualify				Did not qualify			
(Japan) 2011	9th place	Level II			3rd place	5	4	1
(Thailand) 2013	9th place	Level II			3rd place	5	3	2
(China) 2015	Did not qualify				Did not qualify			
(India) 2017	Did not qualify				Did not qualify			
(India) 2019	Did not qualify				Did not qualify			
(Jordan) 2021	11th place	Level II			3rd place	5	3	2
(Australia) 2023	Did not qualify				1st place	5	5	0
(China) 2025	8th place	Level II			Did not qualify			
Total	34	10	24		39	19	20	

=== Asian Games ===
Asian Games record
Year	Position	Pld	W	L
(Iran) 1974	Did not participate			
(Thailand) 1978	Did not participate			
(India) 1982	Did not participate			
(South Korea) 1986	Did not participate			
(China) 1990	Did not participate			
(Japan) 1994	Did not participate			
(Thailand) 1998	Did not participate			
(South Korea) 2002	Did not participate			
(Qatar) 2006	Did not participate			
(China) 2010	Did not participate			
(South Korea) 2014	Did not participate			
(Indonesia) 2018	7th place	7	2	5
(China) 2022	5th place	4	1	3
(Japan) 2026				
Total		11	3	8

=== SEABA Championship for Women ===
SEABA Championship record
Year	Position	Pld	W	L
(Thailand) 1995	-	-	-	-
(Thailand) 1997	-	-	-	-
(Malaysia) 1999	-	-	-	-
(Thailand) 2002	-	-	-	-
(Singapore) 2004	-	-	-	-
(Thailand) 2007	4th place	6	1	5
(Philippines) 2010	4th place	5	1	4
(Indonesia) 2014	2nd place	3	1	2
(Malaysia) 2016	4th place	6	3	3
Total				

=== SEA Games ===
SEA Games record
Year	Position	Pld	W	L
(Malaysia) 1977	4th place	3	0	3
(Indonesia) 1979	3rd place	-	-	-
(Philippines) 1981	5th place	4	0	4
(Singapore) 1983	5th place	4	0	4
(Thailand) 1985	Did not participate			
(Indonesia) 1987	-	-	-	-
(Malaysia) 1989	3rd place	4	2	2
(Philippines) 1991	2nd place	6	4	2
(Singapore) 1993	-	-	-	-
(Thailand) 1995	4th place	6	2	4
(Indonesia) 1997	3rd place	5	3	2
(Brunei) 1999	Not held			
(Malaysia) 2001	4th place	4	1	3
(Vietnam) 2003	5th place	5	1	4
(Philippines) 2005	Not held			
(Thailand) 2007	Did not participate			
(Laos) 2009	Not held			
(Indonesia) 2011	5th place	4	0	4
(Myanmar) 2013	4th place	4	1	3
(Singapore) 2015	2nd place	5	4	1
(Malaysia) 2017	3rd place	6	4	2
(Philippines) 2019	3rd place	3	1	2
(Vietnam) 2021	2nd place	5	4	1
(Cambodia) 2023	Champions	6	6	
(Thailand) 2025	3rd place	5	3	2
Total				

== Current roster ==
Roster for the 2025 FIBA Women's Asia Cup.

Indonesia women's national basketball team roster
Players
Coaches

Pos.	No.	Name	Age – Date of birth	Height	Club	Ctr.
PG	2	Agustin Retong	29 – 24 August 1995	1.67 m (5 ft 6 in)	Surabaya Fever	(Indonesia)
PF	9	Dewa Kusuma	26 – 20 November 1998	1.76 m (5 ft 9 in)	GMC Cirebon	(Indonesia)
PF	10	Priscilla Karen (C)	29 – 20 May 1996	1.70 m (5 ft 7 in)	Surabaya Fever	(Indonesia)
SF	11	Faizzatus Shoimah	24 – 13 December 2000	1.75 m (5 ft 9 in)	GMC Cirebon	(Indonesia)
PG	12	Adelaide Wongsohardjo	23 – 12 October 2001	1.73 m (5 ft 8 in)	GMC Cirebon	(Indonesia)
PF	13	Yuni Anggraeni	31 – 28 June 1994	1.75 m (5 ft 9 in)	Sahabat Semarang	(Indonesia)
SF	14	Jesslyn Aritonang	22 – 18 July 2002	1.70 m (5 ft 7 in)	Surabaya Fever	(Indonesia)
SG	21	Nathania Orville	24 – 3 August 2000	1.76 m (5 ft 9 in)	Surabaya Fever	(Indonesia)
SG	24	Bella Hasan	19 – 6 November 2005	1.68 m (5 ft 6 in)	Southern Utah Thunderbirs	(United States)
PF	26	Kim Pierre-Louis	31 – 11 August 1993	1.83 m (6 ft 0 in)	BG Donau-Ries	(Germany)
SG	71	Clarita Antonio	26 – 1 July 1999	1.78 m (5 ft 10 in)	Surabaya Fever	(Indonesia)
C	99	Angelica Candra	20 – 5 July 2005	1.80 m (5 ft 11 in)	Mataram Yogyakarta	(Indonesia)

Head coach

- (Indonesia) Andrie Ekayana Santosa

Assistant coach(es)

- (Indonesia) Marlina Herawan

Legend

- (C) Team captain
- Club – describes last
  club before the tournament
- Age – describes age
  on 13 July 2025

== See also ==
- Women's basketball in Indonesia
- Indonesia women's national 3x3 team
- Indonesia women's national under-18 basketball team
- Indonesia women's national under-16 basketball team
