= Basketball at the 1991 SEA Games =

8th SEA Games Basketball Tournament
- Quezon City 1991

Tournament details
- Games: 1991 SEA Games
- Host nation: Philippines
- City: Quezon City
- Venue: Araneta Coliseum
- Duration: 30 November–4 December

Men's tournament
- Teams: 5
Medals
Gold medalists	Philippines
Silver medalists	Thailand
Bronze medalists	Malaysia

Women's tournament
- Teams: 6
Medals
Gold medalists	Thailand
Silver medalists	Indonesia
Bronze medalists	Malaysia

Tournaments
← Kuala Lumpur 1989	Singapore 1993 →

The 1991 SEA Games Men's Basketball Tournament were held at the Araneta Coliseum in Quezon City, east of Manila.

== Participating nations ==
- Philippines
- Indonesia
- Malaysia
- Myanmar
- Thailand
- Singapore

== Men's tournament ==
=== Preliminary round ===
Team	Pld	W	L	Pts
Philippines	4	4	0	8
Thailand	4	3	1	7
Malaysia	4	2	2	6
Singapore	4	1	3	5
Indonesia	4	0	4	4

November

Malaysia	W–L	Indonesia

Araneta Coliseum, Quezon City

November

Singapore	L–W	Philippines

Araneta Coliseum, Quezon City

November 29
16:00

Singapore	vs.	Malaysia

Araneta Coliseum, Quezon City

November 29
19:00

Indonesia	vs.	Thailand

Araneta Coliseum, Quezon City

November 30
16:00

Malaysia	67–87	Thailand

Araneta Coliseum, Quezon City

November 30
19:00

Recap

Philippines	82–59	Indonesia
Scoring by half: 37–30, 45–29
Pts: Meneses, Limpot 18		Pts: Sukarna 11

Araneta Coliseum, Quezon City
Referees: Al Asfour Ahmad (KUW), Chompoo Wachirasrisukanya (THA)

December 1
16:00

Indonesia	62–73	Singapore
Scoring by half: 25–38, 37–35
Pts: Riftki 19		Pts: Lua M.K. 21

Araneta Coliseum, Quezon City
Referees: Conrado Mercado (PHI), Bryan Tabanag (PHI)

December 1
19:00

Recap

Thailand	55–92	Philippines
Scoring by half: 30–52, 25–40
Pts: Phairotrpiraphaisan 14		Pts: Limpot 19

Araneta Coliseum, Quezon City
Referees: Rashad Amin (EGY), Abdul Rachman (INA)

December 2
16:00

Thailand	79–65	Singapore
Scoring by half: 47–40, 32–25
Pts: Songpop 30		Pts: Teo C.E. 18

Araneta Coliseum, Quezon City
Referees: Rolando Ocampo (PHI), Reynaldo Mata (PHI)

December 2
19:00

Recap

Philippines	87–69	Malaysia
Scoring by half: 47–33, 40–36
Pts: Limpot 25		Pts: Tan K.C. 21

Araneta Coliseum, Quezon City
Referees: Al Asfour Ahmad (KUW), Abdul Rachman (INA)

=== Bronze medal match ===
December 4
15:30

Malaysia	103–80	Singapore
Scoring by half: 47–33, 40–36
Pts: Tan K.C. 24		Pts: Chua K.E. 16

Araneta Coliseum, Quezon City
Referees: Conrado Mercado (PHI), Bryan Tabanag (PHI)

=== Gold medal match ===
December 4
18:30

Recap

Philippines	77–72	Thailand
Scoring by half: 46–34, 31–38
Pts: Limpot 28		Pts: Homlaor 14

Araneta Coliseum, Quezon City
Referees: Rashad Amin (EGY), Al Asfour Ahmad (KUW)

== Women's tournament ==
=== Preliminary round ===
Team	Pld	W	L	Pts
Thailand	5	5	0	10
Indonesia	5	4	1	9
Philippines	5	3	2	8
Malaysia	5	2	3	7
Myanmar	5	1	4	6
Singapore	5	0	5	5

November 30
13:00

Indonesia	71–57	Singapore
Scoring by half: 42–31, 29–26
Pts: Legawa 22		Pts: Norlilina 21

Araneta Coliseum, Quezon City
Referees: Manuel Salonga (PHI), Bryan Tabanag (PHI)

November 30
14:30

Malaysia	103–71	Myanmar
Scoring by half: 54–14, 49–47
Pts: Lew P.M. 18		Pts: Thew 23

Araneta Coliseum, Quezon City
Referees: Reynaldo Mata (PHI), Privado Tabanag (PHI)

November 30
17:30

Thailand	78–62	Philippines
Scoring by half: 35–31, 43–31
Pts: Thanomsup 19		Pts: Columna 18

Araneta Coliseum, Quezon City
Referees: Rashad Amin (EGY), Abdul Rachman (INA)

December 1
13:00

Myanmar	55–91	Thailand
Scoring by half: 23–39, 32–52
Pts: Thwe 19		Pts: Rattna 27

Araneta Coliseum, Quezon City
Referees: Estifanio Bermos (PHI), Privado Tabanag (PHI)

December 1
14:30

Philippines	100–66	Singapore
Scoring by half: 51–34, 49–32
Pts: Amos 22		Pts: Ng S.H. 19

Araneta Coliseum, Quezon City
Referees: Al Refur Ahmad (KUW), U. Somkiat (THA)

December 1
17:30

Indonesia	58–49	Malaysia
Scoring by half: 14–25, 44–24
Pts: Yuliga 19		Pts: Cheat K.N. 14

Araneta Coliseum, Quezon City
Referees: Manuel Salonga (PHI), Reynaldo Mata (PHI)

December 2
13:00

Thailand	90–39	Singapore
Scoring by half: 41–20, 49–19
Pts: Malimon 13		Pts: Ng S.H. 14

Araneta Coliseum, Quezon City
Referees: Manuel Salonga (PHI), Estifanio Bermos (PHI)

December 2
14:30

Myanmar	48–98	Indonesia
Scoring by half: 20–41, 28–57
Pts: Thein, Thwa 12		Pts: Suryana 16

Araneta Coliseum, Quezon City
Referees: Conrado Mercado (PHI), Bryan Tabanag (PHI)

December 2
17:30

Philippines	65–49	Malaysia
Scoring by half: 35–23, 30–26
Pts: Pastor 15		Pts: Lew P.M. 8

Araneta Coliseum, Quezon City
Referees: Rashad Amin (EGY), Chompoo Wachirasrisukanya (THA)

=== Bronze medal match ===
December 4
14:00

Malaysia	88–79	Philippines
Scoring by half: 46–40, 42–39
Pts: Koh 16		Pts: Columna 24

Araneta Coliseum, Quezon City
Referees: U. Somkiat (THA), Chompoo Wachirasrisukanya (THA)

=== Gold medal match ===
December 4
17:00

Indonesia	54–65	Thailand
Scoring by half: 26–32, 28–33
Pts: Tan 17		Pts: Lekkla 21

Araneta Coliseum, Quezon City
Referees: Romeo Guevara (PHI), Rolando Ocampo (PHI)

== Winners ==
16th Southeast Asian Games Manila 1991 men's basketball tournament

Philippines
Seventh Gold Medal title

16th Southeast Asian Games Manila 1991 women's basketball tournament

Thailand
First Gold Medal title

== Medal tally ==
Rank	Nation	Gold	Silver	Bronze	Total
1	Thailand	1	1	0	2
2	Philippines	1	0	0	1
3	Indonesia	0	1	0	1
4	Malaysia	0	0	2	2
Totals (4 entries)		2	2	2	6
