= Basketball at the 2017 SEA Games – Women's tournament =

Basketball – Women's tournament at the 2017 SEA Games
- Venue: MABA Stadium
- Dates: 20 – 26 August 2017
- Nations: 7

Medalists
gold medal	Malaysia
silver medal	Thailand
bronze medal	Indonesia

The women's basketball tournament at the 2017 SEA Games was held in Kuala Lumpur, Malaysia at the MABA Stadium from 20 to 26 August. Host nation Malaysia won their second consecutive and 14th overall gold medal, with Thailand and Indonesia winning the silver and bronze medals, respectively.

== Competition schedule ==
The following was the competition schedule for the women's basketball competitions:

RR	Round-robin

Sun 20	Mon 21	Tue 22	Wed 23	Thu 24	Fri 25	Sat 26
RR	RR	RR	RR	RR	RR	RR

== Draw ==
There was no official draw conducted. All teams were automatically placed into one group.

- Indonesia
- Malaysia
- Myanmar
- Philippines
- Singapore
- Thailand
- Vietnam

== Competition format ==
The tournament followed a single round robin format with the top team by the end of the tournament winning the gold medal.

== Results ==
All times are Malaysia Standard Time (UTC+8)

=== Round robin ===
Pos	Team	Pld	W	L	PF	PA	PD	Pts	Final Result
1	Malaysia (H)	6	6	0	504	335	+169	12	Gold medal
2	Thailand	6	4	2	432	307	+125	10	Silver medal
3	Indonesia	6	4	2	464	359	+105	10	Bronze medal
4	Philippines	6	4	2	522	336	+186	10	
5	Singapore	6	2	4	401	438	−37	8	
6	Vietnam	6	1	5	317	518	−201	7	
7	Myanmar	6	0	6	276	623	−347	6	

Updated to match(es) played on 26 August 2017. Source: Schedule
Rules for classification: (1) Tournament points, (2) Head-to-head tournament points, (3) Head-to-head goal average, (4) Overall goal average, (5) Drawing of lots
(H) Hosts

20 August 2017
10:15

Report

Indonesia	94–49	Myanmar
Scoring by quarter: 24–11, 18–16, 36–9, 16–13
Pts: Sophia 22; Rebs: Sophia 9 Asts: Christaline 5		Pts: Htwe 13; Rebs: Htwe 11; Asts: Aung 2

MABA Stadium

20 August 2017
12:30

Report

Malaysia	88–54	Vietnam
Scoring by quarter: 23–15, 21–13, 25–10, 19–16
Pts: Y. Chong 17; Rebs: H. Pang, C. Ting 7 each Asts: H. Pang 6		Pts: T. Trat 19; Rebs: T. Huynh 11; Asts: T. Huynh 4

MABA Stadium

20 August 2017
19:15

Report

Philippines	88–54	Singapore
Scoring by quarter: 23–16, 13–9, 28–11, 24–18
Pts: A. Bernardino 16; Rebs: A. Bernardino 10; Asts: F. Cabinbin 3		Pts: S. Poon 10; Rebs: Y. Yoshida 7 Asts: Y. Yoshida 4

MABA Stadium

21 August 2017
11:15

Report

Vietnam	35–86	Thailand
Scoring by quarter: 7–26, 9–27, 7–18, 12–15
Pts: T. Trat 8 Rebs: K. Bui 16; Asts: T. Trat 4		Pts: N. Buapa 15; Rebs: A. Kaichaiyapoom 9 Asts: S. Klanbut 2

MABA Stadium

21 August 2017
13:30

Report

Singapore	55–74	Malaysia
Scoring by quarter: 13–23, 9–16, 19–17, 14–18
Pts: Chu, S. Poon 12 each Rebs: Lim 10; Asts: Chu, W. Koh, Lim 2 each		Pts: Ting 16; Rebs: Chong 8 Asts: Saw 5

MABA Stadium

21 August 2017
20:15

Report

Indonesia	78–68	Philippines
Scoring by quarter: 14–24, 20–17, 25–9, 19–18
Pts: N. Christaline 25; Rebs: Y. Anggraeni 11; Asts: A. Retong 4		Pts: A. Lim 15; Rebs: J. Animam 7 Asts: A. Bernardino 5

MABA Stadium

22 August 2017
11:15

Report

Thailand	70–42	Singapore
Scoring by quarter: 20–8, 15–9, 17–11, 18–14
Pts: S. Klanbut 13; Rebs: S. Kunchuan, A. Kaichaiyapoom, J. Mathuros 7 each Asts: W. Saechua, J. Mathuros 7 each		Pts: Z. Lim 11; Rebs: R. Lim 14; Asts: W. Koh 6

MABA Stadium

22 August 2017
13:30

Report

Philippines	123–33	Myanmar
Scoring by quarter: 33–8, 31–6, 22–5, 37–14
Pts: C. Castro 21; Rebs: A. Almazan 14; Asts: F. Cabinbin 9		Pts: T. Htwe, Y. Yu 2 each Rebs: T. Htwe 10; Asts: S. Zin 5

MABA Stadium

22 August 2017
20:15

Report

Malaysia	72–57	Indonesia
Scoring by quarter: 15–14, 15–17, 20–16, 22–10
Pts: K. Rajintiran 16; Rebs: H. Pang 10; Asts: H. Pang 7		Pts: G. Sophia 14; Rebs: G. Sophia 7 Asts: N. Christaline, S. Sumiati, Y. Anggraeni 2 each

MABA Stadium

23 August 2017
11:15

Report

Myanmar	52–107	Singapore
Scoring by quarter: 9–18, 16–22, 14–37, 13–30
Pts: T. Htwe 21; Rebs: T. Htwe 8 Asts: T. Htwe 5		Pts: Z. Lim 23; Rebs: Y. Yoshida 12; Asts: W. Koh 7

MABA Stadium

23 August 2017
13:30

Report

Vietnam	38–91	Indonesia
Scoring by quarter: 11–23, 11–22, 6–22, 10–24
Pts: H. Linh 11; Rebs: T. Huynh, T. Trat 7 each Asts: T. Trat 4		Pts: M. Ulfah 15; Rebs: Y. Soemaryono 8 Asts: A. Retong, S. Sumiati 5 each

MABA Stadium

23 August 2017
20:15

Report

Philippines	69–67	Thailand
Scoring by quarter: 18–13, 12–32, 21–16, 18–6
Pts: A. Lim 16; Rebs: A. Almazan 13; Asts: F. Cabinbin 4		Pts: N. Banmoo 12; Rebs: S. Klanbut 6 Asts: W. Saechua 4

MABA Stadium

24 August 2017
11:15

Report

Malaysia	60–56	Philippines
Scoring by quarter: 13–12, 21–11, 13–15, 13–18
Pts: Y. Chong 12; Rebs: Y. Chong 8 Asts: C. Ting 4		Pts: A. Lim 17; Rebs: A. Bernardino 9 Asts: F. Cabinbin 5

MABA Stadium

24 August 2017
13:30

Report

Thailand	79–35	Myanmar
Scoring by quarter: 25–15, 17–0, 17–12, 20–8
Pts: T. Maihom 20; Rebs: A. Kaichaiyapoom 12; Asts: W. Saechua 5		Pts: Y. Yu 8 Rebs: K. Soe, H. Lin 10 each Asts: S. Zin 3

MABA Stadium

24 August 2017
20:15

Report

Singapore	81–71	Vietnam
Scoring by quarter: 24–11, 22–20, 16–21, 19–19
Pts: S. Poon 26; Rebs: R. Lim 12; Asts: Y. Yoshida 5		Pts: T. Trat 19; Rebs: K. Bui 11; Asts: T. Huynh 3

MABA Stadium

25 August 2017
10:15

Report

Vietnam	44–118	Philippines
Scoring by quarter: 21–20, 2–32, 10–34, 11–32
Pts: T. Huynh 9 Rebs: T. Huynh, T. Tran 5 each Asts: T. Trat, H. Linh, T. Tran 3 each		Pts: C. Resultay 26; Rebs: A. Almazan 12; Asts: M. Tongco 5

MABA Stadium

25 August 2017
12:30

Report

Myanmar	53–145	Malaysia
Scoring by quarter: 21–28, 12–29, 12–46, 8–42
Pts: H. Lin 13; Rebs: K. Soe 5 Asts: S. Zin 4		Pts: P. Ooi 34; Rebs: N. Yaakob 7 Asts: C. Tai 9

MABA Stadium

25 August 2017
19:15

Report

Thailand	70–61	Indonesia
Scoring by quarter: 20–16, 14–10, 24–20, 12–15
Pts: P. Yothanan 16; Rebs: S. Klanbut 13; Asts: T. Maihom 5		Pts: H. Sutjiono 13; Rebs: G. Sophia 9 Asts: A. Retong 5

MABA Stadium

26 August 2017
11:15

Report

Indonesia	83–62	Singapore
Scoring by quarter: 18–17, 24–13, 24–22, 17–10
Pts: G. Sophia 30; Rebs: G. Sophia 13; Asts: N. Christaline 4		Pts: E. Tan 12; Rebs: R. Lim 6 Asts: Y. Yoshida 4

MABA Stadium

26 August 2017
13:30

Report

Myanmar	54–75	Vietnam
Scoring by quarter: 17–24, 12–25, 12–15, 13–11
Pts: Y. Yu 20; Rebs: T. Htwe 8 Asts: H. Aung 4		Pts: T. Trat 16; Rebs: T. Tran 11; Asts: T. Huynh 5

MABA Stadium

26 August 2017
18:00

Report

Malaysia	65–60	Thailand
Scoring by quarter: 17–26, 18–13, 16–10, 14–11
Pts: C. Ting 18; Rebs: H. Pang 8 Asts: H. Pang, F. Yap 3		Pts: T. Maihom 18; Rebs: P. Yothanan 8 Asts: P. Yothanan 2

MABA Stadium

== Final standings ==
Rank	Team
1st place, gold medalist(s)	Malaysia
2nd place, silver medalist(s)	Thailand
3rd place, bronze medalist(s)	Indonesia
4	Philippines
5	Singapore
6	Vietnam
7	Myanmar

== See also ==
- Men's tournament
