= Basketball at the 1989 SEA Games =

7th SEA Games Basketball Tournament
- Kuala Lumpur 1989

Tournament details
- SEA Games: 1989 SEA Games
- Host nation: Malaysia
- City: Kuala Lumpur
- Venue: Stadium Negara
- Duration: 21–25 August

Men's tournament
- Teams: 5
Medals
Gold medalists	Malaysia
Silver medalists	Philippines
Bronze medalists	Thailand

Women's tournament
- Teams: 5
Medals
Gold medalists	Thailand
Silver medalists	Malaysia
Bronze medalists	Indonesia

Tournaments
← Jakarta 1987	Quezon City 1991 →

The basketball tournament at the 1989 SEA Games took place from 21 to 25 August 1989. This edition of the tournament featured both men's and women's tournament. All matches took place at Stadium Negara in Kuala Lumpur.

After the round robin tournament, Malaysia, by virtue of defeating the defending champions the Philippines, won the championship for their second title since the 1979 edition. The Philippines would continue winning gold in these tournaments until their streak was broken in the 2021 SEA Games.

Meanwhile, Thailand, after being undefeated in the women's division, won their first ever championship, thus ending the hosts Malaysia's reign of six-time defending champions.

== Tournament format ==
For both the men's and the women's tournament, the competition was on a round robin format, wherein the top team at the end of the single round wins the gold medal, with the next two team will take home the silver and bronze medals, respectively.

== Men's tournament ==
=== Participating nations ===
- Indonesia
- Malaysia
- Philippines
- Singapore
- Thailand

=== Results ===
Pos	Team	Pld	W	L	PF	PA	PD	Pts	Final Result
1	Malaysia (H)	4	4	0	430	352	+78	8	Gold medal
2	Philippines	4	3	1	400	339	+61	7	Silver medal
3	Thailand	4	2	2	345	358	−13	6	Bronze medal
4	Singapore	4	1	3	334	389	−55	5	
5	Indonesia	4	0	4	267	338	−71	4	

Rules for classification: (1) Tournament points, (2) Head-to-head tournament points, (3) Head-to-head goal average, (4) Overall goal average, (5) Drawing of lots
(H) Hosts

21 August 1989
14:00

Malaysia	106–93	Singapore

Stadium Negara, Kuala Lumpur

21 August 1989
20:15

Thailand	93–97	Philippines
Scoring by half: 44–43, 49–54

Stadium Negara, Kuala Lumpur

22 August 1989
15:45

Indonesia	60–64	Thailand

Stadium Negara, Kuala Lumpur

22 August 1989
20:15

Malaysia	107–99	Philippines
Scoring by half: 57–44, 50–55

Stadium Negara, Kuala Lumpur

23 August 1989
15:45

Indonesia	65–91	Philippines
Scoring by half: 32–54, 33–37

Stadium Negara, Kuala Lumpur

23 August 1989
20:15

Singapore	97–102	Thailand

Stadium Negara, Kuala Lumpur

24 August 1989
15:45

Singapore	70–68	Indonesia

Stadium Negara, Kuala Lumpur

24 August 1989
20:15

Malaysia	104–86	Thailand

Stadium Negara, Kuala Lumpur

25 August 1989
15:45

Philippines	113–74	Singapore

Stadium Negara, Kuala Lumpur

25 August 1989
20:15

Malaysia	113–74	Indonesia

Stadium Negara, Kuala Lumpur

== Women's tournament ==
=== Participating nations ===
- Indonesia
- Malaysia
- Myanmar
- Philippines
- Thailand

=== Results ===
Pos	Team	Pld	W	L	PF	PA	PD	Pts	Final Result
1	Thailand	4	4	0	365	221	+144	8	Gold medal
2	Malaysia (H)	4	3	1	267	187	+80	7	Silver medal
3	Indonesia	4	2	2	225	237	−12	6	Bronze medal
4	Philippines	4	1	3	144	186	−42	5	
5	Myanmar	4	0	4	193	363	−170	4	

Rules for classification: (1) Tournament points, (2) Head-to-head tournament points, (3) Head-to-head goal average, (4) Overall goal average, (5) Drawing of lots
(H) Hosts

21 August 1989
15:45

Thailand	120–45	Myanmar

Stadium Negara, Kuala Lumpur

21 August 1989
18:30

Malaysia	69–49	Indonesia

Stadium Negara, Kuala Lumpur

22 August 1989
14:00

Indonesia	77–52	Myanmar

Stadium Negara, Kuala Lumpur

22 August 1989
18:30

Philippines	42–72	Thailand

Stadium Negara, Kuala Lumpur

23 August 1989
14:00

Myanmar	54–63	Philippines

Stadium Negara, Kuala Lumpur

23 August 1989
18:30

Malaysia	95–96	Thailand

Stadium Negara, Kuala Lumpur

24 August 1989
14:00

Indonesia	60–39	Philippines

Stadium Negara, Kuala Lumpur

24 August 1989
18:30

Malaysia	103–42	Myanmar

Stadium Negara, Kuala Lumpur

25 August 1989
14:00

Indonesia	39–77	Thailand

Stadium Negara, Kuala Lumpur

25 August 1989
18:30

Malaysia	W–L	Philippines

Stadium Negara, Kuala Lumpur

Preceded by 1987	Basketball at the Southeast Asian Games; 1989	Succeeded by 1991
