= Basketball at the 1995 SEA Games =

10th SEA Games Basketball Tournament
- Chiang Mai 1995

Tournament details
- SEA Games: 1995 SEA Games
- Host nation: Thailand
- City: Chiang Mai
- Venue: 700th Anniversary Sport Complex Gymnasium 2
- Duration: 10–16 December 1995

Men's tournament
- Teams: 7
Medals
Gold medalists	Philippines
Silver medalists	Thailand
Bronze medalists	Malaysia

Women's tournament
- Teams: 5
Medals
Gold medalists	Thailand
Silver medalists	Philippines
Bronze medalists	Malaysia

Tournaments
← Singapore 1993	Jakarta 1997 →

Basketball at the 1995 SEA Games was held from 10 to 16 October 1997 in Chiang Mai, Thailand. This edition featured both tournaments for men's and women's team. All matches were held in 700th Anniversary Sport Complex Gymnasium 2.

The Philippines were able to defend their title by defeating the hosts Thailand in their third consecutive Finals match-up, 108–89, for their third consecutive title since 1991 and their ninth overall title. Meanwhile, Malaysia snatched the bronze from the last edition's bronze medallists Indonesia in the battle for third place.

In the women's event, Thailand notched their fifth consecutive championship by defeating last edition's bronze medallists Philippines in their first ever championship match, 91–53. Meanwhile, the last edition's runners-up Malaysia, managed to salvage the bronze medal by subduing Indonesia in the battle for third place.

== Tournament format ==
The competition format for both men's and women's event calls for the top two teams after the single round robin to face in the championship match.

== Men's tournament ==
=== Participating nations ===
- Indonesia
- Laos
- Malaysia
- Myanmar
- Philippines
- Singapore
- Thailand

=== Results ===
Pos	Team	Pld	W	L	PF	PA	PD	Pts	Qualification
1	Philippines	6	6	0	652	375	+277	12	Qualified to the Gold Medal Match
2	Thailand (H)	6	4	2	566	427	+139	10 (Note: 1–1, 1.184)	Qualified to the Gold Medal Match
3	Malaysia	6	4	2	367	309	+58	10 (Note: 1–1, 1.000)	Qualified to the Bronze Medal Match
4	Indonesia	6	4	2	567	419	+148	10 (Note: 1–1, 0.840)	Qualified to the Bronze Medal Match
5	Singapore	6	2	4	289	298	−9	8	
6	Myanmar	6	1	5	163	383	−220	7	
7	Laos	6	0	6	173	473	−300	6	

Rules for classification: (1) Tournament points, (2) Head-to-head tournament points, (3) Head-to-head goal average, (4) Overall goal average, (5) Drawing of lots
(H) Hosts
Notes:

9 December 1995
8:30

Report

Laos	32–116	Malaysia

700th Anniversary Sport Complex Gymnasium 2, Chiang Mai

9 December 1995
10:15

Report

Myanmar	44–95	Singapore

700th Anniversary Sport Complex Gymnasium 2, Chiang Mai

9 December 1995
12:00

Report

Thailand	94–61	Indonesia

700th Anniversary Sport Complex Gymnasium 2, Chiang Mai

10 December 1995
11:45

Report

Indonesia	116–32	Laos

700th Anniversary Sport Complex Gymnasium 2, Chiang Mai

10 December 1995
15:15

Report

Myanmar	57–127	Thailand

700th Anniversary Sport Complex Gymnasium 2, Chiang Mai

10 December 1995
18:45

Report

Philippines	93–68	Singapore

700th Anniversary Sport Complex Gymnasium 2, Chiang Mai

11 December 1995
11:45

Report

Philippines	138–45	Myanmar

700th Anniversary Sport Complex Gymnasium 2, Chiang Mai

11 December 1995
15:15

Report

Indonesia	86–81	Malaysia

700th Anniversary Sport Complex Gymnasium 2, Chiang Mai

11 December 1995
18:45

Report

Thailand	82–61	Singapore

700th Anniversary Sport Complex Gymnasium 2, Chiang Mai

12 December 1995
11:45

Myanmar	W–L	Laos

700th Anniversary Sport Complex Gymnasium 2, Chiang Mai

12 December 1995
15:15

Report

Singapore	65–79	Indonesia

700th Anniversary Sport Complex Gymnasium 2, Chiang Mai

12 December 1995
18:45

Report

Philippines	105–79	Malaysia

700th Anniversary Sport Complex Gymnasium 2, Chiang Mai

13 December 1995
11:45

Report

Indonesia	161–62	Myanmar

700th Anniversary Sport Complex Gymnasium 2, Chiang Mai

13 December 1995
15:15

Report

Philippines	138–45	Laos

700th Anniversary Sport Complex Gymnasium 2, Chiang Mai

13 December 1995
18:45

Report

Thailand	86–91	Malaysia

700th Anniversary Sport Complex Gymnasium 2, Chiang Mai

14 December 1995
11:45

Report

Laos	64–103	Thailand

700th Anniversary Sport Complex Gymnasium 2, Chiang Mai

14 December 1995
15:15

Report

Philippines	85–64	Indonesia

700th Anniversary Sport Complex Gymnasium 2, Chiang Mai

14 December 1995
18:45

Malaysia	W–L	Singapore

700th Anniversary Sport Complex Gymnasium 2, Chiang Mai

15 December 1995
14:30

Myanmar	L–W	Malaysia

700th Anniversary Sport Complex Gymnasium 2, Chiang Mai

15 December 1995
16:15

Singapore	W–L	Laos

700th Anniversary Sport Complex Gymnasium 2, Chiang Mai

15 December 1995
18:00

Report

Philippines	93–74	Thailand

700th Anniversary Sport Complex Gymnasium 2, Chiang Mai

==== Bronze medal match ====
16 December 1995
14:45

Malaysia	W–L	Indonesia

700th Anniversary Sport Complex Gymnasium 2, Chiang Mai

==== Gold medal match ====
16 December 1995
18:15

Report

Philippines	108–89	Thailand
Scoring by half: 45−39, 51−47

700th Anniversary Sport Complex Gymnasium 2, Chiang Mai

== Women's tournament ==
=== Participating nations ===
- Indonesia
- Malaysia
- Myanmar
- Philippines
- Thailand
- Vietnam

=== Results ===
Pos	Team	Pld	W	L	PF	PA	PD	Pts	Qualification
1	Thailand (H)	5	5	0	101	42	+59	10	Qualified to the Gold Medal Match
2	Philippines	5	4	1	359	278	+81	9	Qualified to the Gold Medal Match
3	Malaysia	5	3	2	365	225	+140	8	Qualified to the Bronze Medal Match
4	Indonesia	5	2	3	292	318	−26	7	Qualified to the Bronze Medal Match
5	Myanmar	5	1	4	197	272	−75	6	
6	Vietnam	5	0	5	238	417	−179	5	

Rules for classification: (1) Tournament points, (2) Head-to-head tournament points, (3) Head-to-head goal average, (4) Overall goal average, (5) Drawing of lots
(H) Hosts

10 December 1995
10:00

Report

Malaysia	115–33	Vietnam

700th Anniversary Sport Complex Gymnasium 2, Chiang Mai

10 December 1995
13:30

Report

Philippines	103–51	Myanmar

700th Anniversary Sport Complex Gymnasium 2, Chiang Mai

10 December 1995
17:00

Report

Indonesia	42–101	Thailand

700th Anniversary Sport Complex Gymnasium 2, Chiang Mai

11 December 1995
10:00

Report

Vietnam	50–112	Indonesia

700th Anniversary Sport Complex Gymnasium 2, Chiang Mai

11 December 1995
13:30

Report

Philippines	81–79	Malaysia

700th Anniversary Sport Complex Gymnasium 2, Chiang Mai

11 December 1995
17:00

Thailand	W–L	Myanmar

700th Anniversary Sport Complex Gymnasium 2, Chiang Mai

12 December 1995
10:00

Report

Vietnam	81–99	Myanmar

700th Anniversary Sport Complex Gymnasium 2, Chiang Mai

12 December 1995
13:30

Report

Indonesia	64–83	Malaysia

700th Anniversary Sport Complex Gymnasium 2, Chiang Mai

12 December 1995
17:00

Philippines	L–W	Thailand

700th Anniversary Sport Complex Gymnasium 2, Chiang Mai

13 December 1995
10:00

Report

Myanmar	47–88	Malaysia

700th Anniversary Sport Complex Gymnasium 2, Chiang Mai

13 December 1995
13:30

Report

Philippines	84–74	Indonesia

700th Anniversary Sport Complex Gymnasium 2, Chiang Mai

13 December 1995
17:00

Thailand	W–L	Vietnam

700th Anniversary Sport Complex Gymnasium 2, Chiang Mai

14 December 1995
10:00

Myanmar	L–W	Indonesia

700th Anniversary Sport Complex Gymnasium 2, Chiang Mai

14 December 1995
13:30

Report

Philippines	91–74	Vietnam

700th Anniversary Sport Complex Gymnasium 2, Chiang Mai

14 December 1995
17:00

Malaysia	L–W	Thailand

700th Anniversary Sport Complex Gymnasium 2, Chiang Mai

==== Bronze medal match ====
16 December 1995
13:00

Malaysia	W–L	Indonesia

700th Anniversary Sport Complex Gymnasium 2, Chiang Mai

==== Gold medal match ====
16 December 1995
16:30

Report

Thailand	91–53	Philippines
Scoring by half: 35−20, 56−33

700th Anniversary Sport Complex Gymnasium 2, Chiang Mai

Preceded by 1993	Basketball at the SEA Games; 1995 SEA Games	Succeeded by 1997
