= Philippines men's national basketball team =

Men's national basketball team representing the Philippines

Philippines
- FIBA ranking: 40 ▼1 (September 1, 2026)
- Joined FIBA: 1936; 90 years ago
- FIBA zone: FIBA Asia
- National federation: SBP
- Coach: Tim Cone
- Nickname: Gilas Pilipinas

Olympic Games
- Appearances: 7

FIBA World Cup
- Appearances: 7
- Medals: (bronze) Bronze: (1954)

FIBA Asia Cup
- Appearances: 29
- Medals: Gold: (1960, 1963, 1967, 1973, 1985); Silver: (1965, 1971, 2013, 2015); Bronze: (1969)

Asian Games
- Appearances: 19
- Medals: Gold: (1951, 1954, 1958, 1962, 2022); Silver: (1990); Bronze: (1986, 1998)

SEA Games
- Appearances: 23
- Medals: Gold: (1977, 1981, 1983, 1985, 1987, 1991, 1993, 1995, 1997, 1999, 2001, 2003, 2007, 2011, 2013, 2015, 2017, 2019, 2023, 2025); Silver: (1979, 1989, 2021)
Home	Away

First international
- Philippines 26–8 China (Manila, Philippines; February 7, 1913)

Biggest win
- Philippines 183–40 North Yemen (New Delhi, India; November 22, 1982)

Biggest defeat
- Philippines 53–121 United States (Melbourne, Australia; November 26, 1956)
Medal record
FIBA World Cup
Bronze medal – third place	1954 Rio de Janeiro
FIBA Asia Cup
Gold medal – first place	1960 Manila
Gold medal – first place	1963 Taipei
Gold medal – first place	1967 Seoul
Gold medal – first place	1973 Manila
Gold medal – first place	1985 Kuala Lumpur
Silver medal – second place	1965 Kuala Lumpur
Silver medal – second place	1971 Tokyo
Silver medal – second place	2013 Manila
Silver medal – second place	2015 Changsha
Bronze medal – third place	1969 Bangkok
FIBA Asia Challenge
Bronze medal – third place	2014 Hubei
Asian Games
Gold medal – first place	1951 New Delhi	Team
Gold medal – first place	1954 Manila	Team
Gold medal – first place	1958 Tokyo	Team
Gold medal – first place	1962 Jakarta	Team
Gold medal – first place	2022 Hangzhou	Team
Silver medal – second place	1990 Beijing	Team
Bronze medal – third place	1986 Seoul	Team
Bronze medal – third place	1998 Bangkok	Team
Southeast Asian Games
Gold medal – first place	1977 Kuala Lumpur	Team
Gold medal – first place	1981 Manila	Team
Gold medal – first place	1983 Singapore	Team
Gold medal – first place	1985 Bangkok	Team
Gold medal – first place	1987 Jakarta
Gold medal – first place	1991 Manila	Team
Gold medal – first place	1993 Singapore
Gold medal – first place	1995 Chiang Mai	Team
Gold medal – first place	1997 Jakarta	Team
Gold medal – first place	1999 Bandar Seri Begawan
Gold medal – first place	2001 Kuala Lumpur	Team
Gold medal – first place	2003 Hanoi	Team
Gold medal – first place	2007 Nakhon Ratchasima	Team
Gold medal – first place	2011 Jakarta/Palembang	Team
Gold medal – first place	2013 Nay Pyi Taw	Team
Gold medal – first place	2015 Singapore	Team
Gold medal – first place	2017 Kuala Lumpur	Team
Gold medal – first place	2019 Pasay	Team
Gold medal – first place	2023 Phnom Penh	Team
Gold medal – first place	2025 Bangkok–Chonburi	Team
Silver medal – second place	1979 Jakarta
Silver medal – second place	1989 Kuala Lumpur	Team
Silver medal – second place	2021 Hanoi	Team
SEABA Championship
Gold medal – first place	1998 Manila
Gold medal – first place	2001 Manila
Gold medal – first place	2003 Kuala Lumpur
Gold medal – first place	2007 Ratchaburi
Gold medal – first place	2009 Medan
Gold medal – first place	2011 Jakarta
Gold medal – first place	2015 Singapore
Gold medal – first place	2017 Quezon City
Silver medal – second place	1996 Surabaya
SEABA Cup
Gold medal – first place	2012 Chiang Mai
Gold medal – first place	2016 Bangkok
Far Eastern Championship Games
Gold medal – first place	1913 Manila
Gold medal – first place	1915 Shanghai
Gold medal – first place	1917 Tokyo
Gold medal – first place	1919 Manila
Gold medal – first place	1923 Osaka
Gold medal – first place	1925 Manila
Gold medal – first place	1927 Shanghai
Gold medal – first place	1930 Tokyo
Gold medal – first place	1934 Manila
Silver medal – second place	1921 Shanghai
William Jones Cup
Gold medal – first place	1985 Taiwan
Gold medal – first place	1998 Taiwan
Gold medal – first place	2012 Taiwan
Silver medal – second place	2015 Taiwan
Bronze medal – third place	2005 Taiwan
Bronze medal – third place	2007 Taiwan
Bronze medal – third place	2011 Taiwan

The Philippines men's national basketball team (Filipino: Pambansang koponan ng basketbol ng Pilipinas), commonly known as Gilas Pilipinas, is the basketball team representing the Philippines. The team is managed by the Samahang Basketbol ng Pilipinas (Basketball Federation of the Philippines or simply SBP).

The team won a bronze medal in the 1954 FIBA World Championship, the best finish by any team outside the Americas and Europe. In the Olympics, the team took a fifth-place finish at the 1936 Summer Olympics, the best finish by a men's team outside the Americas, Europe and Oceania. The Philippines holds the record for most games won at the Olympics among teams outside the Americas, Europe and Oceania.

Aside from the bronze medal at the FIBA World Cup and the fifth-place Olympic finish, the Philippines has won five FIBA Asia Cups (formerly known as the FIBA Asia Championship), five Asian Games men's basketball gold medals, eight SEABA Championships, all but three Southeast Asian Games men's basketball gold medals, and has the most titles in Southeast Asia Basketball Association men's championship, being considered the powerhouse team in Southeast Asia and one of Asia's elite basketball teams. The country has also participated in seven FIBA World Cups and seven Olympic Basketball Tournaments.

== History ==
=== Early years ===
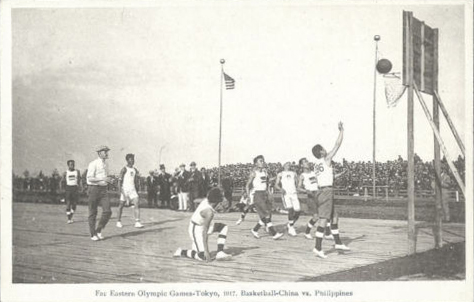
The Philippine national team competing against China at the 1917 Far Eastern Games in Tokyo.

The Philippines first participated in international basketball in the Far Eastern Championship Games in 1913. The Philippines defeated China in what was the first international game in Asia. The Philippines won all but one (1921) championship until 1934. The games were not under the supervision of FIBA as the organization was founded in 1932.

The Basketball Association of the Philippines (BAP) was founded in 1936, and became a part of FIBA later that year. Also in the same year, the BAP sent a team nicknamed "the Islanders" that participated in the first Olympic basketball tournament in Berlin. With the tournament under a single-elimination round format from the third game onwards, the Philippines won their first three games only to face the United States in their fourth game. The USA doubled the Philippines' score as they advanced to the next round, and subsequently win the gold medal undefeated. The Philippines wound up fifth place, winning the rest of their games, in the best finish by a men's Asian team in Olympic basketball history. Aside from silver medalists Canada, the Philippines was the only other team that only had one loss in the tournament.

The Philippines returned to the 1948 Olympics in London. The team finished fourth of six teams in their group to be eliminated. The team wound up in twelfth place.

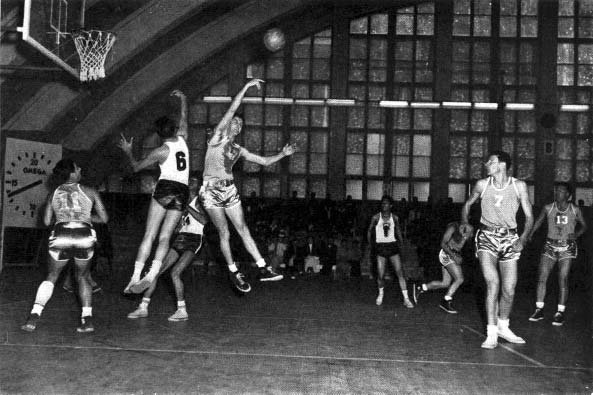
Philippines vs Argentina at the 1952 Summer Olympics.

In the 1950s–1960s, the Philippines was among the best in the world, producing world-class players like Carlos Loyzaga, Lauro Mumar, Mariano Tolentino, Francisco Rabat and Edgardo Ocampo. In 1951, team won the inaugural Asian Games basketball tournament in New Delhi, India. The team finished ahead of Japan and four other teams to win the gold medal. On the next Asian Games in 1954 in Manila that served as a qualifiers for the World Championship later that year, the team finished first anew, beating out the Republic of China (Taiwan), Japan and South Korea in the final round.

In 1954 FIBA World Championship in Brazil, Loyzaga was a part of the Mythical Team selection, where the Philippines won the bronze medal. The Philippines finished second in their group behind Brazil and ahead of Paraguay to enter the final round, where the team lost against the US by only 13 points; only the loss against the US and two losses against Brazil were the Philippines' only losses in the world championship. To date, the Philippines' performance remains the best performance by an Asian team in the World Championship.

In the 1956 Olympics, the Philippines finished seventh. The team qualified to the quarterfinals, with only loss against the USA. However, the team lost all of their games against France, Uruguay and Chile in the quarterfinals. The Philippines defeated Chile in the seventh-place game to finish with a 4–4 record. Two years later, in the 1958 Asian Games in Tokyo, the Philippines won its third consecutive gold medal, finishing first in the final round.

The Philippines was grouped with Bulgaria, Puerto Rico and Uruguay in the 1959 FIBA World Championship. The team finished third, losing against Bulgaria and Puerto Rico, to crash out of the final round. The Philippines won all of the games in the classification round against the United Arab Republic (Egypt) and Canada to meet Uruguay for the eighth-place game. The team defeated Uruguay again to finish eighth. This would be the last tournament of Loyzaga and company.

=== Asian Championship ===
Starting in 1960, the Asian Basketball Championship was held to determine Asia's participants in the Olympics and the World Championships. Qualifying for the Asian Championship was by subzone, or by the ranking in the most recent tournament; in this case, with the Philippines being the strongest team in Southeast Asia, the country will qualify easily for the continental championship, even if they failed to qualify via rankings from the previous tournament. The inaugural Asian Championship was held in Manila.

With an Asian Championship, the Philippines qualified for the 1960 Olympics. In Rome, the Philippines did not qualify for the medal round, but did beat Spain in the preliminaries, ultimately finishing 11th out of 16 nations. The country was supposed to host the 1963 World Championship, but President Diosdado Macapagal refused to allow players from Yugoslavia and other communist countries to enter the country. This caused the Philippines, despite winning the Asian Championships, to qualify via a pre-Olympic tournament, in which they were unsuccessful.

In the fifth championship at Bangkok, the Philippines finished third, after a one-point loss against Japan, and an 86–95 loss against South Korea.

=== Creation of the Philippine Basketball Association ===
In 1975, after disputes with the Basketball Association of the Philippines (BAP), nine teams pulled out of BAP's jurisdiction and founded the professional Philippine Basketball Association (PBA), taking along all the best players with them. This caused the BAP to send weakened teams in the subsequent international tournaments, as professionals are not allowed to play. The Filipinos fail to defend their Asian championship in 1975, with India earning a shock blowout win to deny the Philippines a top-4 finish. The Chinese won the championship, beginning their unbeaten championship run that will last into 1983. The nationals were denied of a top 4 finish in the 1977 Asian Championship, losing this time to Malaysia. The Philippines then hosted the 1978 FIBA World Championship, losing all of the games via blowouts to finish last in the final round.

=== The NCC program (1980–1986) ===
To offset the loss of players of the PBA, the BAP delegated to businessman Eduardo Cojuangco, Jr. the formation of a team that will train together for several months, in essence, a club team unaffiliated with any league. The result was the Northern Cement basketball team coached by the American Ron Jacobs that had four naturalized players. In the 1982 Asian Games in New Delhi, the team finished fourth behind Korea, China and Japan. In the 1983 Asian Championship in Hong Kong, the Philippines forfeited their preliminary round games after a misunderstanding in the rules that caused the Philippines to play more than one naturalized player on the floor at the time. The Philippines, without their naturalized players, made short work of the classification round to finish in ninth place. The Northern Cement team won the 1985 Asian Championship in Kuala Lumpur, to qualify for the 1986 FIBA World Championship in Spain.

On February 22, 1986, the People Power Revolution erupted and forced president Ferdinand Marcos into exile. Cojuangco, a known ally of Marcos, also left the country, causing the team not to participate in the World Championship. The team did participate in the 1986 Asian Games, finishing third behind China and Korea.

=== Professional era ===
In 1989, FIBA allowed professionals to play in their tournaments. This caused the BAP to have an agreement with the PBA in which the latter will form national teams for the Asian Games, while the former will do so in other tournaments. In the 1989 Southeast Asian Games, the BAP-sponsored team coached by Derrick Pumaren suffered a shock loss to Malaysia in the gold medal game, the only time the Philippines failed to win the gold medal at the Southeast Asian Games in which basketball was played, until 2021 edition when they also settled again in silver medal.

In 1990, the Philippines sent an all-pro national team, coached by Robert Jaworski, to regain the country's basketball supremacy in the Asian Games but the team lost in the final against China and settled for a silver medal. The team includes 1990 PBA Most Valuable Player Allan Caidic and Samboy Lim, who were both selected in the Asian Games Mythical Five Selections.

In the 1991 Asian Championship in Kobe, Japan, the Philippines finished second in their preliminary round group behind China, but a loss against Japan caused their elimination, ending up in seventh place, when Jordan forfeited the game. In 1993, the Philippines failed to qualify in the quarterfinal groups, suffering losses against Korea (five points) and the UAE (four points) en route to an 11th-place finish.

In the 1994 Asian Games in Hiroshima, the Philippines, coached by the American Norman Black, sent in a team composed of PBA players and selected amateurs. The team finish second in the preliminary round, losing to Korea. The loss to Korea meant that the Philippines has to face China; despite losing, the Chinese had their slimmest winning margin in the tournament with nine points, en route to their gold medal. The Philippines were upended by the hosts Japan in the bronze medal game, losing by three points in overtime.

With no PBA players on the roster, the team on the 1995 Asian Championship in Seoul finished last in the preliminary round, but managed to win two games in the classification round to finish 12th out of 19 teams. The team that went to Riyadh for the ABC Championship 1997 did only marginally better; they still finished last in the preliminary round but topped the classification round group en route to a ninth-place finish.

In 1998, the PBA formed the Philippine Centennial Team coached by the American Tim Cone that captured the 21st William Jones Cup championship but finished with the bronze medal in the 1998 Asian Games held in Bangkok. The Filipinos faced their old nemesis Korea in the quarterfinals and were blown out by twenty points, which led them to face China in the semifinals anew. The result would be the same as four years earlier, with the Chinese winning by nine. The Filipinos won the bronze medal game though, against Kazakhstan.

In the 1999 Asian Championship in Fukuoka, Japan, the Philippines, with no PBA players on their roster, finished last in the preliminary round, and second in the classification round to finish 11th out of 15 teams. In Shanghai for the 2001 Asian Championship, the Philippines was suspended by FIBA due to leadership disputes at the BAP. This caused the country to miss their first Asian championship. By 2002, a compromise was sorted out, and the Philippines was allowed to participate in the 2002 Asian Games, coached by Jong Uichico.

In Busan, South Korea, the Philippines easily qualified for the quarterfinals, in which they are grouped with China, Japan and Chinese Taipei. The Philippines won by five points against Japan, and 14 points against Chinese Taipei. The game against China wasn't as close, with the Philippines losing by 41 points, but this assured that they won't have to face China in the semifinals. For the third consecutive time, the Filipinos and Koreans faced in the semifinals, with the same result: the Koreans won over the Philippines, this time by one point. Up by two points, Olsen Racela missed two free throws, that led to a Lee Sang-min three-pointer at the buzzer to eliminate the Filipinos. The team would lose in the bronze medal game against Kazakhstan by 2 points as Korea defeated China in overtime by a basket to win Asian Games gold for the first time since 1970.

With no PBA players in the roster, the 2003 Asian Championship in Harbin was the worst performance by the team in history: a 15th-place finish out of 16 teams. Unlike in 1997 and 1999, the Philippines had one win in the preliminary round (against Jordan). However, in the classification round, the Philippines emerged winless in a group containing Syria, Kuwait and Hong Kong. Only a blowout win against Malaysia saved the Philippines from dropping to the cellar. After the championship, BAP was heavily criticized and took steps to strengthen the team. However, after a loss against the Parañaque Jets, a team composed of politicians, actors and amateurs, by the BAP-managed team, another leadership crisis in the BAP ensued which caused another suspension from FIBA. As a result, the Philippines was not able to participate in the 2005 FIBA Asia Championship and the 2006 Asian Games.

=== SBP era (2007–present) ===
==== Team Pilipinas (2007–2009) ====
After the conclusion of the leadership struggle that saw the Samahang Basketbol ng Pilipinas (SBP), an organization backed by the PBA among others, being recognized by both FIBA and the Philippine Olympic Committee, the Philippines was reinstated by FIBA. San Miguel-Team Pilipinas was hastily assembled for the 2007 FIBA Asia Championship in Tokushima. The team defeated China, which didn't send its best team since they already qualified for the 2008 Olympics, but lost to Iran and Jordan to bow out of contention. The Filipinos and Chinese met again for the ninth place game in which the Filipinos won by two points. The Philippines qualified for the 2009 FIBA Asia Championship in Tianjin. The Philippines advanced to the quarterfinals to meet Jordan. The Jordanians raced to an early lead where the Filipinos never recovered to win the game. The Filipinos and the Koreans played for seventh place, which saw the Koreans winning by two points.

==== Gilas Pilipinas (2010–present) ====
Following the Northern Cement model of the 1980, the SBP established the Smart Gilas Pilipinas program, backed by SBP President Manuel V. Pangilinan, as a developmental team that aims to qualify in the 2012 Olympics. In the 2010 Asian Games, the Filipinos met the Korean team anew in the quarterfinals and was eliminated. In the 2011 championship at Wuhan, the SBP successfully petitioned the naturalization of Marcus Douthit; the team progressed up to the semifinals for the first time since 1987. Meeting Jordan, the team lost, never recovering after a third quarter run by the Jordanians. In the bronze medal game against Korea with a berth to an Olympic qualifying tournament at stake, the team raced to an early lead, but the Koreans cut the lead and eventually won the game after the Filipinos missed free-throws at the end game. Despite missing an Olympic berth, Smart Gilas' performance was the best finish in the championship since 1987, and the best finish in any major Asian competition since 2002.

After failing to qualify for the Olympics, the SBP decided to form the next edition of Smart Gilas Pilipinas team (Smart Gilas Pilipinas 2.0) composed of PBA players. The Smart Gilas Pilipinas program was renamed Gilas Pilipinas in 2013, still sponsored by Smart Communications. The national team played in the 2013 FIBA Asia Championship which was hosted at home. After losing to Chinese Taipei in the last game of the preliminary round to finish second, the team won four consecutive games to set up a semifinal against the Koreans. In a close game, the Philippines pulled away late in the game to win 86–79. The win sent the team to the finals and guaranteed qualification to the FIBA Basketball World Cup (new name of the FIBA World Championship) for the first time since 1978. The Philippines, appearing in the first FIBA Asia Championship final since the introduction of a championship game in 1987, lost by 14 points against undefeated Iran in the final to settle for a silver medal.

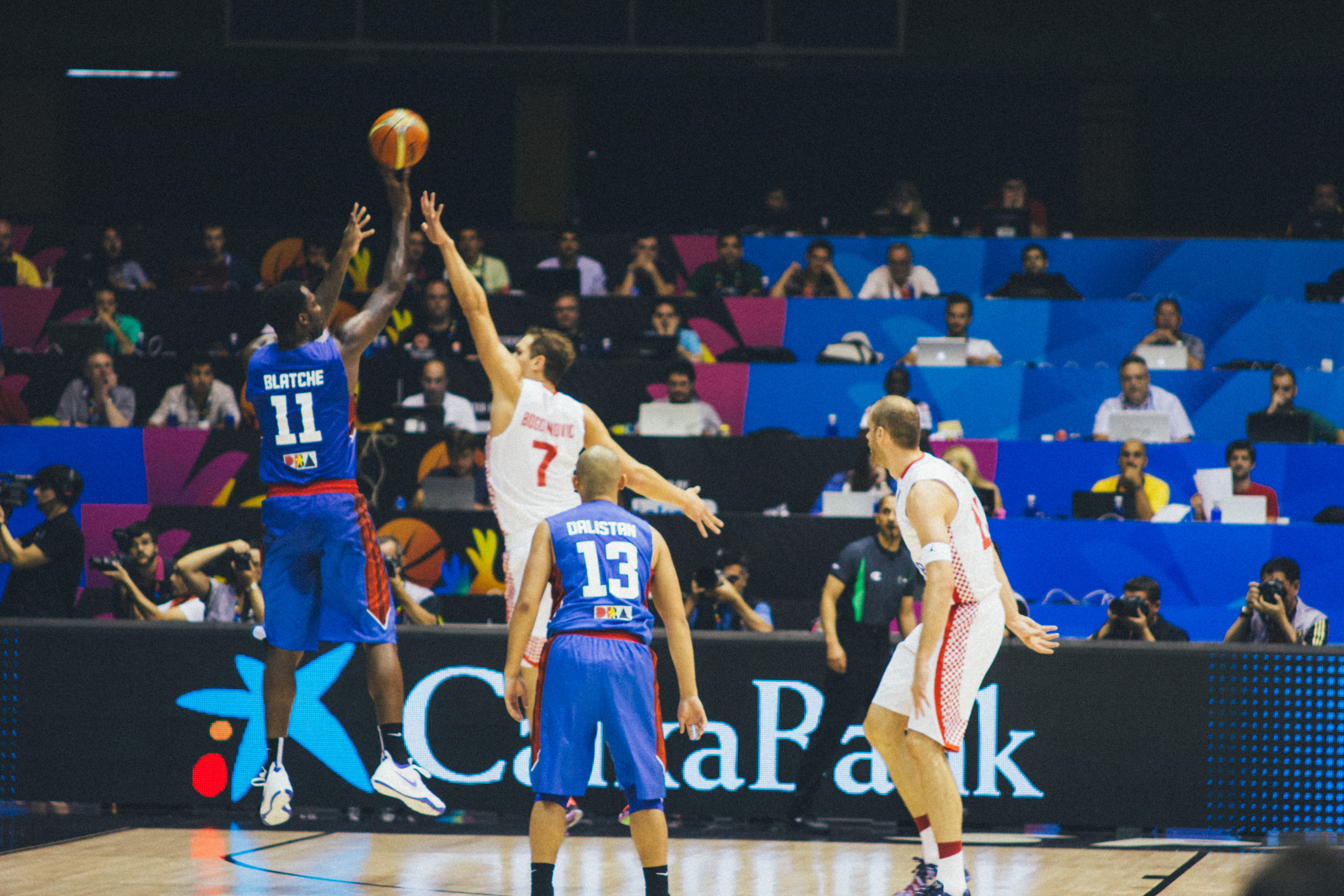
Philippines vs Croatia at the 2014 FIBA World Cup.

The Congress of the Philippines naturalized Andray Blatche in time for the 2014 FIBA Basketball World Cup to beef-up its center position. With Blatche in tow, the Philippines nearly won four tightly fought games against higher ranked teams of Croatia, Greece, Argentina and Puerto Rico, before winning in overtime against Senegal to record its first victory at the World Cup in 40 years. In the 2014 Asian Games, Blatche was not able to join the squad due to residency requirements by the Olympic Council of Asia and Douthit suit up as the national team's naturalized player instead. The Philippines finished seventh, its worst finish in the Asian Games until the 2026 edition where they finished ninth.

On October 30, 2014, the SBP announced the formation of two selection committees to search and appoint the coach and players of future Philippine teams – for elite level and for youth level tournaments. Chot Reyes remained coach until a replacement was decided. The new roster aims to compete in the 2015 FIBA Asia Championship in China which will serve as the Asian qualifiers of the 2016 Summer Olympics Basketball tournament in Rio de Janeiro.

On December 23, 2014, Tab Baldwin was formally announced as the new coach of the Philippine national team. Baldwin's four-year tenure as coach officially began on January 1, 2015. The team captured the silver medal in the 2015 William Jones Cup but fell short of the gold medal in the 2015 FIBA Asia Championship. However, the Philippines qualified for the 2016 FIBA World Olympic Qualifying Tournament but the team failed in their bid to Rio Olympics losing to France and New Zealand.

The team won gold during 2016 SEABA Cup and a qualifying slot in the 2016 FIBA Asia Challenge. However, as they were represented by the Gilas Cadets with no professional or naturalized players, the team suffered its worst performance placing 9th over-all, a very huge setback due to conflicting schedule with the national league and mismanagement of the SBP. In October 2016, Chot Reyes returned as head coach. In 2017, the Philippines hosted the 2017 SEABA Championship and the team swept the competition for the gold medal and the lone spot in the sub-zone for the 2017 FIBA Asia Cup. During the 2017 FIBA Asia Cup, the national team would sweep the group stage consisting of teams from China, Iraq and Qatar. The team failed to advance in the quarterfinals however and finished the tournament in seventh place. The Philippines defended their gold medal for the 12th straight time in the 2017 South East Asian Games beating Indonesia in the finals.

FIBA introduced a qualification process which does not involve the continental tournaments for the 2019 FIBA Basketball World Cup. The Philippines' qualification bid was marred by a brawl during the team's July 2018 tie against Australia in the first round of the Asian qualifiers. The incident caused suspensions for some of the players and coaches as well as a fine for SBP. Chot Reyes, who served suspension due to his involvement in the brawl was also replaced by Yeng Guiao. That game and incident started a slump in the standings that almost eliminated the Philippines from the World Cup, but under Guiao they managed to qualify in the last matchday by beating Kazakhstan, combined with a Lebanon loss to South Korea. The 2019 FIBA Basketball World Cup saw the Philippines with a 0–5 record, the country's worst performance since the 1978 edition, losing four of its five games in a blowout. This was due to lack of preparations and key players begging off from the team, as well as injuries. Due to the disappointing results, the SBP sent an all-professional team for the 2019 South East Asia Games to re-establish its dominance. The national team swept the competition for their 18th Gold Medal in the tournament.

The 2022 FIBA Asia Cup qualifiers saw the country win all of its six games, including two victories over South Korea. The team also played at one of the 2020 FIBA Men's Olympic Qualifying Tournaments in Belgrade, Serbia. In the 2022 FIBA Asia Cup, the team finished third in its group, being defeated by Lebanon and New Zealand. The team was then eliminated in the first round by Japan, finishing the tournament in ninth place.

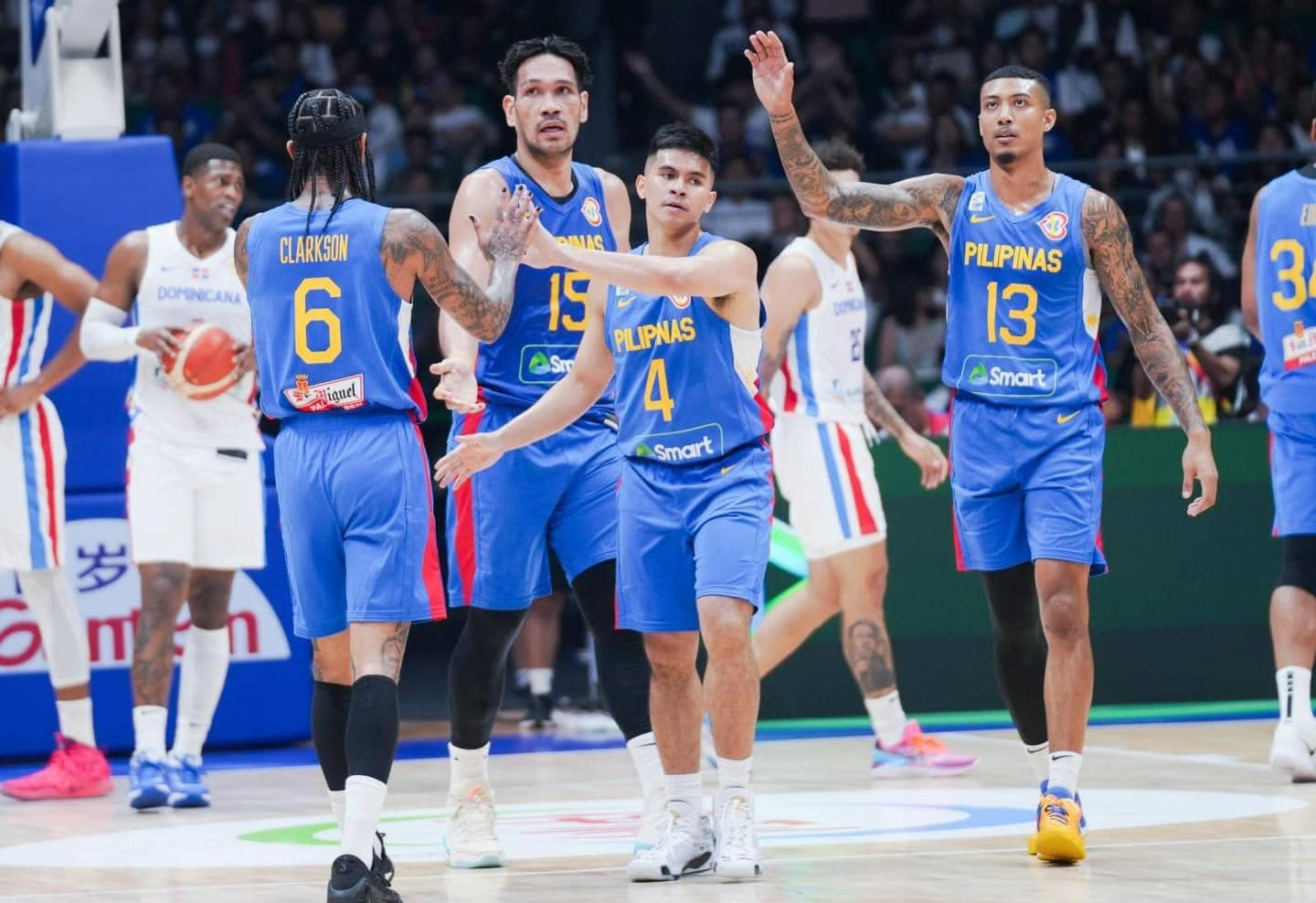
The team playing against the Dominican Republic; their opening 2023 FIBA Basketball World Cup game

The country co-hosted the 2023 FIBA Basketball World Cup with Japan and Indonesia. Despite being automatically qualified as co-hosts, the Philippines still took part in the tournament's Asian Qualifiers by virtue of qualifying for the Asia Cup. In the World Cup, the country had a 1–4 record, with their win coming against China—their first tournament win on home soil as they were not able to win a game during their last hosting in 1978.

In the 2022 Asian Games, the Philippines clinched its first gold medal since the 1962 edition, after defeating Iran and China by a single point each in the quarterfinals and semifinals, respectively, and beating Jordan in the final.

Historic wins for the national team continued under head coach Tim Cone at the 2024 FIBA Olympic Qualifying Tournament as the Philippines stunned the world's sixth-ranked Latvia to take their first win in an Olympic qualifier since 1964 and their first win against a European country in any FIBA competition since the 1960 Summer Olympics. This win extended the Philippines' international winning streak to seven games, excluding friendly matches.

== FIBA suspensions ==
=== 1963 ===
In 1963, FIBA suspended the Philippines for its failure to stage the 1963 FIBA World Championship after Philippine president Diosdado Macapagal refused to allow players from Yugoslavia and other communist countries to enter the country. Later, the Philippines, despite being the Asian champion, was forced to play in a pre-Olympic tournament in order to qualify for the 1964 Summer Olympics.

=== 2001 ===
The leadership crisis in the Basketball Association of the Philippines (BAP) worsened after a lengthy feud between the group of Graham Lim and Tiny Literal and the group of Freddie Jalasco and Lito Puyat which resulted in the suspension of the BAP. After a few months, FIBA intervened and ordered an election which resulted in Literal's victory as the president of the BAP. The suspension was quickly lifted and the Philippines was able to compete in the Southeast Asian Games in Malaysia.

=== 2005–2007 ===
The Philippines was again suspended in July 2005 after a long-standing feud between the BAP and the Philippine Olympic Committee (POC).

The conflict began on April 10, 2005, when the BAP-sponsored Cebuana-Lhuillier Philippine National team (composed of little-known amateur players) lost to a lowly Parañaque Jets team (made up of showbiz personalities) in a National Basketball Conference (NBC) pre-season tournament at the Rizal Memorial Coliseum. Upon hearing the news, POC president Jose Cojuangco, Jr. called for improvements in the national team, most notably, in the sending of a new team made up of players from the Philippine Basketball Association (PBA).

The PBA, together with the Philippine Basketball League (PBL), the UAAP and the NCAA, reportedly came to an agreement on the formation of a new national team. The POC, through a vote, first suspended, then in a later meeting, expelled the BAP as the official National Sports Association (NSA) for basketball and installed a new member in the Philippine Basketball Federation. The BAP, under new president Joey Lina, said that the expulsion was unconstitutional in the by-laws of the POC.

In hopes of securing a long-term solution, the FIBA ordered the PBA, PBL, UAAP, NCAA and Joey Lina (as an individual – or in Lina's claim, as a representative of the BAP) to form a new constitution or form of a new basketball body. By March 2006, the four stakeholders (PBA, PBL, UAAP and NCAA) signed an agreement to propose a new basketball body (Pilipinas Basketball). Lina refused to sign the memorandum, citing "unbalanced factors" that was put in the draft. After the four stakeholders met with Baumann in South Korea, the suspension was not lifted and the draft for a new body was not accepted since Lina was not in agreement. After several meetings between Baumann and the officials of the BAP and Pilipinas Basketball in Geneva and Bangkok, a Unity Congress was held. The BAP and Pilipinas Basketball agreed to merge, creating the Samahang Basketbol ng Pilipinas (SBP) as the new national basketball federation. The POC recognized the SBP as the new national governing body for basketball, after which the FIBA finally lifted the almost two-year-old suspension it imposed upon the country.

== Nickname ==
The first Philippine team that competed in the 1936 Olympic Games were known as "the Islanders". After the Philippines became a republic in 1946, the national team was simply referred to by the press as the "RP 5" or "RP team" ("RP" standing for "Republic of the Philippines").

When the Northern Cement basketball team represented the Philippines from 1983 to 1985, the team was referred to as the "NCC" team. After the disbandment of the NCC team in 1986, the national team was referred to as "RP 5" or "RP team" once again.

In the 1990 Asian Games, following the example of the first U.S. Dream Team, the Philippine team was referred to the "Philippines Dream Team", as this was the first national team with PBA players. Later, it was referred to as "Team Philippines". Eventually, "Team Philippines" became the name used to refer to the entire Philippine contingent in multi-sports events such as the Asian and Olympic Games.

During the Philippine Centennial in 1998, the team became known as the Philippine Centennial Team.

From 2005 to 2009, Team Pilipinas represented the men's basketball team. Team Pilipinas was the initiative of the PBA and sponsored by San Miguel Corporation (2005–2007, named "San Miguel-Team Pilipinas") and Coca-Cola Bottlers Philippines, Inc. (2009, named "Powerade-Team Pilipinas").

In 2010, the Smart Gilas Pilipinas and Sinag Pilipinas programs replaced the Team Pilipinas program. Sinag Pilipinas represents the country in regional competitions such as the Southeast Asian Games and SEABA Championship. Smart Communications is the main sponsor of both programs. Gilas is a Filipino word that loosely translates into English as "prowess", and sinag translates as "ray" (sunlight). The name Gilas was adopted from the mascot of the 2005 Southeast Asian Games held in Manila, Philippines which is an eagle (agila). The mascot was designed by Filipino sports journalist Danny Simon.

In 2013, the Smart brand was dropped from the branding of both programs, although Smart Communications remained as the main sponsor. In 2015, the Sinag Pilipinas program was renamed into as the "Gilas Cadets".

In December 2016, the Gilas Pilipinas program got a big boost as a new backer in Chooks-to-Go to form partnership with Smart Communications in the united effort in supporting the Pinoy cagers in their quest for international glory. The team carry that name when participated in 2017 international games.

The squad that participated in the 2018 Asian Games was referred to as Rain or Shine-Philippines (RoS-Philippines), Gilastopainters or simply Team Pilipinas due to the core of the team being composed of Rain or Shine Elasto Painters players instead of the Gilas. The squad stood-in for the Gilas Pilipinas roster which had many of its players as well as Reyes himself suspended due to their involvement in the Philippines-Australia brawl.

Gilas Pilipinas continued the name of the men's national team. In May 2019, the Samahang Basketbol ng Pilipinas formally adopted the Gilas Pilipinas name for the all teams (men's, women's, youth, and 3x3) as part of a larger rebrand and restructuring.

== Uniform ==
2002 Asian Games red uniform

The national colors of blue, white and red have been used in national team uniforms throughout history. Most teams used a blue uniform as the dark-colored uniform, and a white uniform for light-colored uniform. Red was occasionally used as a tertiary color. In the 2002 Asian Games, the dark-colored uniform was a red one. It has consistently used the blue and white uniform as dark and light uniforms, respectively.

The national team under the Samahang Basketbol ng Pilipinas (SBP) initially had Accel as its official outfitter. Nike was the official outfitter of the national team from 2007 to 2024. Adidas was announced to be the national team outfitter in May 2025. The first Adidas uniforms were unveiled in July 2025.

=== Manufacturer ===
- Until 2007: Accel
- 2007–2024: Nike
- 2025–present: Adidas

== Fixtures and results ==
2026 results

Date	Opponent	Result	Score	Venue	Competition
February 26	New Zealand	L	66–69	SM Mall of Asia Arena, Pasay, Philippines	2027 FIBA World Cup qualification R1
March 1	Australia	L	66–93	SM Mall of Asia Arena, Pasay, Philippines	2027 FIBA World Cup qualification R1
June 28	(New Zealand) Manawatu Jets	W	90–61	Fly Palmy Arena, Palmerston North, New Zealand	Exhibition game
June 30	(New Zealand) Franklin Bulls	W	94–66	Franklin Pool and Leisure Centre, Pukekohe, New Zealand	Exhibition game
July 3	New Zealand	L	102–106 (2OT)	Spark Arena, Auckland, New Zealand	2027 FIBA World Cup qualification R1
July 6	Australia	L	49–92	Perth Arena, Perth, Australia	2027 FIBA World Cup qualification R1
August 20	(South Korea) Ulsan Hyundai Mobis Phoebus	W	81–76	SMC Sports Complex, Pasig, Philippines	Exhibition game
August 28	Jordan	W	82–81 (OT)	SM Mall of Asia Arena, Pasay, Philippines	2027 FIBA World Cup qualification R2
August 30	Iran	W	68–56	SM Mall of Asia Arena, Pasay, Philippines	2027 FIBA World Cup qualification R2
September 4	South Korea	L	55–81	Suwon KT Sonicboom Arena, Suwon, South Korea	Exhibition game
September 6	South Korea	L	42–69	Suwon KT Sonicboom Arena, Suwon, South Korea	Exhibition game
September 11	Bahrain	L	85–89	Aichi International Arena, Nagoya, Japan	Asian Games GS
September 12	Kazakhstan	W	109–78	Aichi International Arena, Nagoya, Japan	Asian Games GS
September 14	China	L	61–105	Aichi International Arena, Nagoya, Japan	Asian Games GS
November 27	Syria	TBD	TBD	Karisma Arena, Seremban, Malaysia	2027 FIBA World Cup qualification R2
November 29	Iran	TBD	TBD	Karisma Arena, Seremban, Malaysia	2027 FIBA World Cup qualification R2

== Competitions ==
=== Olympic Games ===
Summer Olympic Games Record
Year	Position	Pld	W	L
(Germany) 1936	5th place	5	4	1
(United Kingdom) 1948	12th place	8	4	4
(Finland) 1952	9th place	5	3	2
(Australia) 1956	7th place	8	4	4
(Italy) 1960	11th place	8	4	4
(Japan) 1964	did not qualify			
(Mexico) 1968	13th place	9	3	6
(West Germany) 1972	13th place	9	3	6
(Canada) 1976	did not qualify			
(Soviet Union) 1980	did not participate			
(United States) 1984	did not qualify			
(South Korea) 1988	did not qualify			
(Spain) 1992	did not qualify			
(United States) 1996	did not qualify			
(Australia) 2000	did not qualify			
(Greece) 2004	did not qualify			
(China) 2008	did not qualify			
(United Kingdom) 2012	did not qualify			
(Brazil) 2016	did not qualify			
(Japan) 2020	did not qualify			
(France) 2024	did not qualify			
(United States) 2028	to be determined			
(Australia) 2032	to be determined			
Total	7/20	52	25	27

==== FIBA World Olympic qualifying tournament ====
FIBA World Olympic Qualifying Tournament
Year	Position	Pld	W	L
(Italy) 1960	Automatic Olympic qualifier			
(Japan) 1964	6th place	9	4	5
(Mexico) 1968	Automatic Olympic qualifier			
(Germany) 1972	Automatic Olympic qualifier			
(Canada) 1976	did not qualify			
(Spain) 1992	did not qualify			
(Greece) 2008	did not qualify			
(Venezuela) 2012	did not qualify			
(Philippines) 2016	6th place	2	0	2
(Serbia) 2020	5th place	2	0	2
(Latvia) 2024	3rd place	3	1	2
Total		16	5	11

=== FIBA Basketball World Cup ===
FIBA World Cup Record					Qualification		
Year	Position	Pld	W	L	Pld	W	L
(Argentina) 1950	did not participate						
(Brazil) 1954	3rd place	9	6	3			
(Chile) 1959	8th place	6	4	2			
(Brazil) 1963	Suspended						
(Uruguay) 1967	did not qualify						
(Socialist Federal Republic of Yugoslavia) 1970	did not qualify						
(Puerto Rico) 1974	13th place	7	2	5	See 1973 ABC Championship		
(Philippines) 1978	8th place	8	0	8	Qualified as hosts		
(Colombia) 1982	did not qualify				See ABC/FIBA Asia Championship records		
(Spain) 1986	Withdrew				See 1985 ABC Championship		
(Argentina) 1990	did not qualify				See ABC/FIBA Asia Championship records		
(Canada) 1994	did not qualify				See ABC/FIBA Asia Championship records		
(Greece) 1998	did not qualify				See ABC/FIBA Asia Championship records		
(United States) 2002	did not qualify				See ABC/FIBA Asia Championship records		
(Japan) 2006	Suspended				See ABC/FIBA Asia Championship records		
(Turkey) 2010	did not qualify				See ABC/FIBA Asia Championship records		
(Spain) 2014	21st place	5	1	4	See 2013 FIBA Asia Championship		
(China) 2019	32nd place	5	0	5	12	7	5
(Philippines) (Japan) (Indonesia) 2023	24th place	5	1	4	10	6	4
(Qatar) 2027	to be determined				8	4	4
(France) 2031	to be determined				to be determined		
Total	7/20	45	14	31	30	17	13

=== FIBA Asia Cup ===
FIBA Asia Cup Record					Qualification		
Year	Position	Pld	W	L	Pld	W	L
(Philippines) 1960	Champions	9	9	0	Qualified as hosts		
(Taiwan) 1963	Champions	11	9	2			
(Malaysia) 1965	Runners-up	9	8	1			
(South Korea) 1967	Champions	9	9	0			
(Thailand) 1969	3rd place	8	6	2			
(Japan) 1971	Runners-up	8	7	1			
(Philippines) 1973	Champions	10	10	0	Qualified as hosts		
(Thailand) 1975	5th place	9	5	4			
(Malaysia) 1977	5th place	9	4	5			
(Japan) 1979	4th place	7	4	3			
(India) 1981	4th place	7	4	3			
(Hong Kong) 1983	9th place	5	3	2			
(Malaysia) 1985	Champions	6	6	0			
(Thailand) 1987	4th place	7	4	3			
(China) 1989	8th place	7	2	5			
(Japan) 1991	7th place	9	5	4			
(Indonesia) 1993	11th place	6	3	3			
(South Korea) 1995	12th place	7	2	5			
(Saudi Arabia) 1997	9th place	6	3	3			
(Japan) 1999	11th place	6	2	4			
(China) 2001	Suspended						
(China) 2003	15th place	7	2	5			
(Qatar) 2005	Suspended						
(Japan) 2007	9th place	7	5	2			
(China) 2009	8th place	9	4	5			
(China) 2011	4th place	9	6	3			
(Philippines) 2013	Runners-up	9	7	2	Qualified as hosts		
(China) 2015	Runners-up	9	7	2	See 2015 SEABA Championship		
(Lebanon) 2017	7th place	6	4	2	See 2017 SEABA Championship		
(Indonesia) 2022	9th place	4	1	3	6	6	0
(Saudi Arabia) 2025	7th place	5	2	3	6	4	2
Total	29/31	220	143	77	12	10	2

=== FIBA Asia Challenge ===
FIBA Asia Challenge Record
Year	Position	Pld	W	L
(Taiwan) 2004	8th place	5	0	5
(Kuwait) 2008	Did not participate			
(Lebanon) 2010	4th place	7	3	4
(Japan) 2012	4th place	7	4	3
(China) 2014	3rd place	6	5	1
(Iran) 2016	9th place	5	1	4
Total	5/6	30	13	17

=== Asian Games ===
Asian Games Record
Year	Position	Pld	W	L
(India) 1951	1st place	4	4	0
(Philippines) 1954	1st place	6	6	0
(Japan) 1958	1st place	7	6	1
(Indonesia) 1962	1st place	7	7	0
(Thailand) 1966	6th place	7	4	3
(Thailand) 1970	5th place	8	4	4
(Iran) 1974	4th place	6	2	4
(Thailand) 1978	5th place	9	4	5
(India) 1982	4th place	10	6	4
(South Korea) 1986	3rd place	4	2	2
(China) 1990	2nd place	6	4	2
(Japan) 1994	4th place	6	3	3
(Thailand) 1998	3rd place	7	4	3
(South Korea) 2002	4th place	7	4	3
(Qatar) 2006	Suspended			
(China) 2010	6th place	9	5	4
(South Korea) 2014	7th place	7	3	4
(Indonesia) 2018	5th place	5	3	2
(China) 2022	1st place	7	6	1
(Japan) 2026	9th place	3	1	2
Total	19/20	125	78	47

=== SEA Games ===
SEA Games record
Year	Position	Pld	W	L
(Malaysia) 1977	1st place	3	2	1
(Indonesia) 1979	2nd place	–	–	–
(Philippines) 1981	1st place	4	3	1
(Singapore) 1983	1st place	–	–	–
(Thailand) 1985	1st place	–	–	–
(Indonesia) 1987	1st place	5	5	0
(Malaysia) 1989	2nd place	4	3	1
(Philippines) 1991	1st place	5	5	0
(Singapore) 1993	1st place	–	–	–
(Thailand) 1995	1st place	7	7	0
(Indonesia) 1997	1st place	4	3	1
(Brunei) 1999	1st place	–	–	–
(Malaysia) 2001	1st place	5	5	0
(Vietnam) 2003	1st place	5	5	0
(Philippines) 2005	Suspended			
(Thailand) 2007	1st place	4	4	0
(Laos) 2009	Not held			
(Indonesia) 2011	1st place	5	5	0
(Myanmar) 2013	1st place	6	6	0
(Singapore) 2015	1st place	5	5	0
(Malaysia) 2017	1st place	5	5	0
(Philippines) 2019	1st place	5	5	0
(Vietnam) 2021	2nd place	6	5	1
(Cambodia) 2023	1st place	5	4	1
(Thailand) 2025	1st place	4	4	0
Total	21/23	87	81	6

=== SEABA Championship ===
SEABA Championship Record
Year	Position	Pld	W	L
(Malaysia) 1994	4th place	–	–	–
(Indonesia) 1996	2nd place	5	4	1
(Philippines) 1998	1st place	5	5	0
(Philippines) 2001	1st place	5	5	0
(Malaysia) 2003	1st place	3	3	0
(Malaysia) 2005	Suspended			
(Thailand) 2007	1st place	4	4	0
(Indonesia) 2009	1st place	4	4	0
(Indonesia) 2011	1st place	4	4	0
(Indonesia) 2013	did not participate			
(Singapore) 2015	1st place	5	5	0
(Philippines) 2017	1st place	6	6	0
Total	10/12	40–1 (excl. 1994)		

=== SEABA Cup ===
SEABA Cup Record
Year	Position	Pld	W	L
(Thailand) 2012	1st place	4	4	0
(Indonesia) 2014	did not participate			
(Thailand) 2016	1st place	5	5	0
Total	2/3	9	9	0

=== Far Eastern Championship Games ===
Far Eastern Championship Games Record
Year	Position	Pld	W	L
(Philippines) 1913	1st place	2	2	0
(Republic of China (1912–1949)) 1915	1st place	2	2	0
(Japan) 1917	1st place	2	2	0
(Philippines) 1919	1st place	2	2	0
(Republic of China (1912–1949)) 1921	2nd place	2	1	1
(Japan) 1923	1st place	2	2	0
(Philippines) 1925	1st place	2	2	0
(Republic of China (1912–1949)) 1927	1st place	2	2	0
(Japan) 1930	1st place	2	2	0
(Philippines) 1934	1st place	2	2	0
Total	10/10	20	19	1

=== Other tournaments ===
Records at minor tournaments
Year	Tournament	Position	Pld	W	L
(Philippines) 2007	Manila Invitational Basketball Cup	1st place	3	3	0
(China) 2008	China-ASEAN CBO Basketball Invitational Tournament	1st place	No information		
(Philippines) 2010	MVP Invitational Champions' Cup	1st place	4	3	1
(Hong Kong) 2013	Super Keung Sheung Cup	1st place	5	5	0
(France) 2014	Antibes International Basketball Tournament	4th place	3	0	3
(Estonia) 2015	Toyota Four Nations Cup	4th place	3	0	3
(Philippines) 2015	MVP Cup	1st place	3	3	0
(Italy) 2016	Imperial Basketball City Tournament	3rd place	2	1	1
(Spain) 2019	Málaga Tournament	3rd place	2	1	1
(Jordan) 2021	King Abdullah Cup	4th place	6	2	4
(China) 2023	Heyuan WUS International Basketball Tournament	1st place	4	3	1
(Qatar) 2025	Doha International Cup	3rd place	3	1	2

==== William Jones Cup ====
- Note: The list only includes those that are participated by the national team. Other teams representing the country are excluded.

William Jones Cup
Year	Position	Pld	W	L
(Taiwan) 1998	1st place	6	6	0
(Taiwan) 2005	3rd place	9	6	3
(Taiwan) 2007	3rd place	9	5	4
(Taiwan) 2009	6th place	8	2	6
(Taiwan) 2010	4th place	6	3	3
(Taiwan) 2011	3rd place	7	5	2
(Taiwan) 2012	1st place	8	7	1
(Taiwan) 2015	2nd place	8	6	2
(Taiwan) 2017	4th place	9	6	3
Total	2 golds 1 silver 3 bronze	70	46	24

==== Philippine Basketball Association ====
Note: This does not include records by the Northern Cement basketball team.

Season	Conference	Competing as	Elimination round					Playoffs			
Season	Conference	Competing as	Finish	Pld	W	L	PCT	Pld	W	L	Results
1986	All-Filipino	Philippine national team	7th/7	6	1	5	.167	1	0	1	Lost to Alaska in the quarterfinal berth playoff
1987	Open	Philippine national team	7th/7	12	2	10	.167	Eliminated			
1988	All-Filipino	Philippine national team	7th/7	12	3	9	.250	Eliminated			
1989	All-Filipino	Philippine national team	n/a	6	0	6	.000	Barred from playoffs			
1998	Centennial	Philippine Centennial Team	8th/9	8	1	7	.125	Eliminated			
2002	Governors'	RP-Hapee Toothpaste	9th/12	11	4	7	.364	Eliminated			
2002	Governors'	RP-Selecta Ice Cream	10th/12	11	4	7	.364	Eliminated			
2002	Commissioner's	RP-Selecta Ice Cream	9th/11	10	3	7	.300	Eliminated			
2003	Invitational	Cebuana Lhuillier	4th/5	4	1	3	.250	Eliminated			
2009–10	Philippine	Smart Gilas	n/a	9	3	6	.333	Barred from playoffs			
2010–11	Commissioner's	Smart Gilas	2nd/10	9	7	2	.778	4	1	3	Lost to Barangay Ginebra in semifinals
Totals				98	29	69	.296	5	1	4	0 PBA championships

== Team ==
=== Roster ===
Competition: 2027 FIBA Basketball World Cup qualification
Opposition: Syria (November 27, 2026)
Venue: Karisma Arena, Seremban, Malaysia

Philippines men's national basketball team – 2027 FIBA Basketball World Cup Qualification Group E roster
Players
Coaches

Pos.	No.	Name	Age – Date of birth	Height	Club	Ctr.
F		Bennie Boatwright (NP)	30 – July 13, 1996	2.08 m (6 ft 10 in)	Fujian Sturgeons	(China)
F/C		A. J. Edu	26 – January 1, 2000	2.08 m (6 ft 10 in)	Gunma Crane Thunders	(Japan)
G		Juan Gómez de Liaño	26 – November 19, 1999	1.83 m (6 ft 0 in)	Converge FiberXers	(Philippines)
C		Quentin Millora-Brown	26 – August 9, 2000	2.08 m (6 ft 10 in)	Nagoya Diamond Dolphins	(Japan)
G		Chris Newsome	36 – July 25, 1990	1.88 m (6 ft 2 in)	Meralco Bolts	(Philippines)
G/F		CJ Perez	31 – September 13, 1995	1.85 m (6 ft 1 in)	San Miguel Beermen	(Philippines)
F/C		Mike Phillips	24 – July 5, 2002	2.03 m (6 ft 8 in)	Kyoto Hannaryz	(Japan)
F		Kevin Quiambao	25 – April 22, 2001	1.93 m (6 ft 4 in)	Goyang Sono Skygunners	(South Korea)
G		Dwight Ramos	28 – September 2, 1998	1.93 m (6 ft 4 in)	Levanga Hokkaido	(Japan)
F/C		Troy Rosario	34 – January 20, 1992	2.01 m (6 ft 7 in)	Barangay Ginebra San Miguel	(Philippines)
C		Kai Sotto	24 – May 11, 2002	2.16 m (7 ft 1 in)	Altiri Chiba	(Japan)
G		Scottie Thompson	33 – July 12, 1993	1.85 m (6 ft 1 in)	Barangay Ginebra San Miguel	(Philippines)

Head coach

- (United States) Tim Cone

Assistant coach(es)

- (Philippines) Richard del Rosario
- (Philippines) Jong Uichico

Legend

- (C) Team captain
- (NP) Naturalized player
- Club – describes last
  club before the tournament
- Age – describes age
  on November 27, 2026

=== Past rosters ===
- Note: Olympics, World Championships (World Cup), Asian Championships (Asia Cup), Asian Games and SEA Games only.

Before 1960

1960–1979

1980–1999

2000–2019

2020–present

== See also ==
- Philippines women's national basketball team
- Philippines men's national under-19 basketball team
- Philippines men's national under-17 basketball team
- Philippines men's national basketball team in FIBA club tournaments
- San Miguel-Team Pilipinas basketball team
- Philippine Centennial Team
- Northern Cement basketball team
- Basketball in the Philippines
- Samahang Basketbol ng Pilipinas
- Philippine Basketball Association
