= Basketball at the 2001 SEA Games =

13th SEA Games Basketball Tournament
- Kuala Lumpur 2001

Tournament details
- SEA Games: 2001 SEA Games
- Host nation: Malaysia
- City: Kuala Lumpur
- Venue: Malaysia Basketball Association Stadium
- Duration: 9–16 September 2001

Men's tournament
- Teams: 6
Medals
Gold medalists	Philippines
Silver medalists	Indonesia
Bronze medalists	Malaysia

Women's tournament
- Teams: 5
Medals
Gold medalists	Malaysia
Silver medalists	Thailand
Bronze medalists	Philippines

Tournaments
← Bandar Seri Begawan 1999	Ho Chi Minh City 2003 →

Basketball at the 2001 SEA Games was held from 9 to 16 September 2001 in Kuala Lumpur, Malaysia. This edition featured both tournaments for men's and women's team. All matches were held in Malaysia Basketball Association Stadium.

The Philippines swept all of their assignments en route to their 12th overall men's title and sixth consecutive since the 1991 Games. Incidentally on the same venue was the last time the defending champions relinquished their SEA Games basketball, bowing to the hosts on the 1989 Southeast Asian Games. Meanwhile, Malaysia managed to defend the title they won since the 1997 edition, their second straight and their tenth overall women's title by edging Thailand in a nailbiter, 71–70.

== Men's tournament ==
=== Participating nations ===
- Indonesia
- Malaysia
- Philippines
- Singapore
- Thailand
- Vietnam

=== Results ===
Team	Pts.	W	L	PF	PA	PD
Philippines	10	5	0	470	297	+151
Indonesia	9	4	1	319	346	–27
Malaysia	8	3	2	133	159	–26
Thailand	7	2	3	152	185	–33
Singapore	4	1	4	59	83	–24
Vietnam	3	0	5	113	176	–63

9 September 2001
16:00

Thailand	99–75	Singapore

MABA Stadium, Kuala Lumpur

9 September 2001
20:00

Malaysia	101–40	Vietnam

MABA Stadium, Kuala Lumpur

10 September 2001
16:00

Box Scores

Indonesia	74–112	Philippines
Scoring by quarter: 15–31, 17–28, 25–24, 17–29
Pts: Cokorda, Sudiadnyana 12		Pts: Adducul 20

MABA Stadium, Kuala Lumpur

10 September 2001
20:00

Singapore	68–74	Malaysia

MABA Stadium, Kuala Lumpur

11 September 2001
16:00

Box Scores

Philippines	100–40	Vietnam
Scoring by quarter: 15–31, 17–28, 25–24, 17–29
Pts: dela Rosa 17		Pts: Khang 10

MABA Stadium, Kuala Lumpur

11 September 2001
20:00

Report

Thailand	87–91	Indonesia

MABA Stadium, Kuala Lumpur

12 September 2001
20:00

Report

Indonesia	78–74	Malaysia

MABA Stadium, Kuala Lumpur

13 September 2001
16:00

Singapore	87–62	Vietnam

MABA Stadium, Kuala Lumpur

13 September 2001
20:00

Report

Philippines	94–65	Thailand

MABA Stadium, Kuala Lumpur

14 September 2001
16:00

Indonesia	92–67	Singapore

MABA Stadium, Kuala Lumpur

14 September 2001
20:00

Thailand	76–77	Malaysia

MABA Stadium, Kuala Lumpur

15 September 2001
16:00

Vietnam	56–63	Thailand

MABA Stadium, Kuala Lumpur

15 September 2001
20:00

Report

Philippines	83–59	Singapore

MABA Stadium, Kuala Lumpur

16 September 2001
16:00

Report

Indonesia	76–73	Vietnam

MABA Stadium, Kuala Lumpur

16 September 2001
18:00

Report

Malaysia	59–81	Philippines

MABA Stadium, Kuala Lumpur

== Women's tournament ==
=== Participating nations ===
- Indonesia
- Malaysia
- Philippines
- Thailand
- Vietnam

=== Results ===
Team	Pts.	W	L	PF	PA	PD
Malaysia	8	4	0	319	236	+83
Thailand	7	3	1	363	263	+100
Philippines	6	2	2	333	249	+84
Indonesia	5	1	3	276	317	–41
Vietnam	4	0	4	200	426	–226

9 September 2001
18:00

Philippines	124–57	Vietnam

MABA Stadium, Kuala Lumpur

10 September 2001
18:00

Thailand	95–71	Indonesia

MABA Stadium, Kuala Lumpur

11 September 2001
18:00

Indonesia	61–96	Malaysia

MABA Stadium, Kuala Lumpur

12 September 2001
16:00

Philippines	W–L	Indonesia

MABA Stadium, Kuala Lumpur

12 September 2001
18:00

Vietnam	L–W	Thailand

MABA Stadium, Kuala Lumpur

13 September 2001
18:00

Report

Malaysia	74–70	Philippines

MABA Stadium, Kuala Lumpur
Referees: Kamen Toshev (BUL), Huang Chao-her (TPE)

14 September 2001
18:00

Indonesia	103–48	Vietnam

MABA Stadium, Kuala Lumpur

15 September 2001
14:00

Thailand	77–61	Philippines

MABA Stadium, Kuala Lumpur

15 September 2001
18:00

Vietnam	35–78	Malaysia

MABA Stadium, Kuala Lumpur

16 September 2001
20:00

Malaysia	71–70	Thailand

MABA Stadium, Kuala Lumpur

Preceded by 1999	Basketball at the SEA Games; 2001 SEA Games	Succeeded by 2003
