= 1994 ABC Championship for Women =

1994 FIBA Women's Asia Cup
15th Asian Women's Basketball Championship

Tournament details
- Host country: Japan
- Dates: April 25 – May 1
- Teams: 11 (from 44 federations)
- Venue: 1 (in 1 host city)

Final positions
- Champions: China (5th title)

The 1994 Asian Basketball Confederation Championship for Women, was the 15th regional championship held by Asian Basketball Confederation. The competition was hosted by Sendai, Japan and took place between April 25 to May 1, 1994. The championship is divided into two levels: Level I and Level II. The last finisher of Level I is relegated to Level II and the top finisher of Level II qualify for Level I 1995's championship.

The tournament originally was scheduled to be held in Taiwan in November 1993 but Taiwan withdrew as host.

== Preliminary round ==
=== Level I ===
Team	Pld	W	L	PF	PA	PD	Pts	Tiebreaker
China	4	3	1	359	237	+122	7	1–1 / 1.014
South Korea	4	3	1	406	254	+152	7	1–1 / 1.013
Japan	4	3	1	359	276	+83	7	1–1 / 0.974
Chinese Taipei	4	1	3	286	326	−40	5	
Hong Kong	4	0	4	188	505	−317	4	

April 25

Japan	109–73	Chinese Taipei
Scoring by half: 58–37, 51–36

Sendai City Gymnasium, Sendai

April 25

South Korea	165–47	Hong Kong
Scoring by half: 81–20, 84–27

Sendai City Gymnasium, Sendai

April 26

Chinese Taipei	51–83	South Korea
Scoring by half: 35–45, 16–38

Sendai City Gymnasium, Sendai

April 26

Hong Kong	39–129	China
Scoring by half: 23–69, 16–60

Sendai City Gymnasium, Sendai

April 27

China	81–51	Chinese Taipei
Scoring by half: 38–30, 43–21

Sendai City Gymnasium, Sendai

April 27

South Korea	87–74	Japan

Sendai City Gymnasium, Sendai

April 29

Japan	76–67	China

Sendai City Gymnasium, Sendai

April 29

Chinese Taipei	111–53	Hong Kong

Sendai City Gymnasium, Sendai

April 30

Hong Kong	49–100	Japan

Sendai City Gymnasium, Sendai

April 30

China	82–71	South Korea

Sendai City Gymnasium, Sendai

=== Level II ===
Team	Pld	W	L	PF	PA	PD	Pts	Tiebreaker
Kazakhstan	5	5	0				10	
Kyrgyzstan	5	4	1				9	
Thailand	5	2	3				7	1–1 / 1.057
Malaysia	5	2	3				7	1–1 / 1.000
Philippines	5	2	3				7	1–1 / 0.974
Indonesia	5	0	5				5	

April 25

Philippines	69–62	Thailand

Sendai City Gymnasium, Sendai

April 25

Kyrgyzstan	70–81	Kazakhstan

Sendai City Gymnasium, Sendai

April 25

Indonesia	50–54	Malaysia

Sendai City Gymnasium, Sendai

April 26

Kazakhstan	115–31	Philippines

Sendai City Gymnasium, Sendai

April 26

Malaysia	vs.	Kyrgyzstan

Sendai City Gymnasium, Sendai

April 26

Thailand	vs.	Indonesia

Sendai City Gymnasium, Sendai

April 27

Thailand	55–77	Kazakhstan

Sendai City Gymnasium, Sendai

April 27

Kyrgyzstan	107–64	Indonesia

Sendai City Gymnasium, Sendai

April 27

Malaysia	61–47	Philippines

Sendai City Gymnasium, Sendai

April 29

Indonesia	46–117	Kazakhstan

Sendai City Gymnasium, Sendai

April 29

Malaysia	54–68	Thailand

Sendai City Gymnasium, Sendai

April 29

Philippines	56–113	Kyrgyzstan

Sendai City Gymnasium, Sendai

April 30

Kazakhstan	vs.	Malaysia

Sendai City Gymnasium, Sendai

April 30

Philippines	vs.	Indonesia

Sendai City Gymnasium, Sendai

April 30

Thailand	vs.	Kyrgyzstan

Sendai City Gymnasium, Sendai

== Final round ==
=== 3rd place ===
May 1

Japan	92–67	Chinese Taipei

Sendai City Gymnasium, Sendai

=== Final ===
May 1

China	74–66	South Korea

Sendai City Gymnasium, Sendai

== Final standing ==
Qualified for the 1994 FIBA World Championship for Women

Rank	Team	Record
1st place, gold medalist(s)	China	4–1
2nd place, silver medalist(s)	South Korea	3–2
3rd place, bronze medalist(s)	Japan	4–1
4	Chinese Taipei	1–4
5	Hong Kong	0–4
6	Kazakhstan	5–0
7	Kyrgyzstan	4–1
8	Thailand	2–3
9	Malaysia	2–3
10	Philippines	2–3
11	Indonesia	0–5

== Awards ==
1994 Asian champions

China
Fifth title
