= Basketball at the 1983 SEA Games =

4th SEA Games Basketball Tournament
- Singapore 1983

Tournament details
- SEA Games: 1983 SEA Games
- Host nation: Singapore
- City: Singapore
- Venue: Gay World Stadium
- Duration: 29 May–5 June

Men's tournament
- Teams: 6
Medals
Gold medalists	Philippines
Silver medalists	Malaysia
Bronze medalists	Thailand

Women's tournament
- Teams: 5
Medals
Gold medalists	Malaysia
Silver medalists	Philippines
Bronze medalists	Singapore

Tournaments
← Manila 1981	Bangkok 1985 →

The basketball tournament at the 1983 SEA Games took place from 29 May to 5 June 1983. This edition of the tournament featured both men's and women's tournament. All matches took place at the Gay World Stadium in Singapore.

== Tournament format ==
For both the men's and the women's tournament, the competition was on a round robin format, wherein the top team at the end of the single round wins the gold medal, with the next two team will take home the silver and bronze medals, respectively.

== Men's tournament ==
=== Participating nations ===
- Brunei
- Indonesia
- Malaysia
- Philippines
- Singapore
- Thailand

=== Results ===
Pos	Team	Pld	W	L	PF	PA	PD	Pts	Final Result
1	Philippines	5	5	0	452	320	+132	10	Gold medal
2	Malaysia	5	4	1	318	253	+65	9	Silver medal
3	Thailand	5	3	2	392	366	+26	8	Bronze medal
4	Singapore (H)	5	2	3	400	373	+27	7	
5	Indonesia	5	1	4	372	420	−48	6	
6	Brunei	5	0	5	277	479	−202	5	

Rules for classification: (1) Tournament points, (2) Head-to-head tournament points, (3) Head-to-head goal average, (4) Overall goal average, (5) Drawing of lots
(H) Hosts

29 May 1983
16:00

Results

Indonesia	73–97	Philippines

Gay World Stadium, Geylang

29 May 1983
21:00

Report

Singapore	126–69	Brunei

Gay World Stadium, Geylang

30 May 1983
16:00

Results

Brunei	77–113	Thailand

Gay World Stadium, Geylang

30 May 1983
19:30

Results

Malaysia	82–54	Indonesia

Gay World Stadium, Geylang

31 May 1983
19:30

Results

Singapore	93–76	Indonesia

Gay World Stadium, Geylang

31 May 1983
21:00

Results

Thailand	60–83	Philippines

Gay World Stadium, Geylang

1 June 1983
16:00

Results

Philippines	128–62	Brunei

Gay World Stadium, Geylang

1 June 1983
21:00:

Report

Singapore	64–79	Malaysia

Gay World Stadium, Geylang

3 June 1983
19:30

Brunei	L–W	Malaysia

Gay World Stadium, Geylang

3 June 1983
21:00

Report

Singapore	58–77	Thailand

Gay World Stadium, Geylang

4 June 1983
14:30

Report

Indonesia	57–79	Thailand

Gay World Stadium, Geylang

4 June 1983
19:00

Report

Malaysia	66–72	Philippines

Gay World Stadium, Geylang

5 June 1983
17:30

Results

Brunei	69–112	Indonesia

Gay World Stadium, Geylang

5 June 1983
19:00

Results

Thailand	63–91	Malaysia

Gay World Stadium, Geylang

5 June 1983
20:30

Results

Singapore	59–72	Philippines

Gay World Stadium, Geylang

=== Final standings ===
Rank	Team
1st place, gold medalist(s)	Philippines
2nd place, silver medalist(s)	Malaysia
3rd place, bronze medalist(s)	Thailand
4	Singapore
5	Indonesia
6	Brunei

== Women's tournament ==
=== Participating nations ===
- Indonesia
- Malaysia
- Philippines
- Singapore
- Thailand

=== Results ===
Pos	Team	Pld	W	L	PF	PA	PD	Pts	Final Result
1	Malaysia	4	4	0	314	214	+100	8	Gold medal
2	Philippines	4	3	1	302	269	+33	7	Silver medal
3	Singapore (H)	4	2	2	248	279	−31	6	Bronze medal
4	Thailand	4	1	3	241	277	−36	5	
5	Indonesia	4	0	4	212	277	−65	4	

Rules for classification: (1) Tournament points, (2) Head-to-head tournament points, (3) Head-to-head goal average, (4) Overall goal average, (5) Drawing of lots
(H) Hosts

29 May 1983
14:30

Results

Thailand	61–86	Philippines

Gay World Stadium, Geylang

29 May 1983
19:30

Report

Singapore	74–50	Indonesia

Gay World Stadium, Geylang

30 May 1983
14:30

Results

Indonesia	53–82	Malaysia

Gay World Stadium, Geylang

30 May 1983
21:00

Results

Singapore	73–82	Philippines

Gay World Stadium, Geylang

31 May 1983
18:00

Results

Malaysia	69–55	Thailand

Gay World Stadium, Geylang

1 June 1983
14:30

Results

Philippines	61–55	Indonesia

Gay World Stadium, Geylang

1 June 1983
19:00

Report

Singapore	68–65	Thailand

Gay World Stadium, Geylang

3 June 1983
18:00

Report

Malaysia	81–73	Philippines

Gay World Stadium, Geylang

4 June 1983
16:00

Report

Indonesia	54–60	Thailand

Gay World Stadium, Geylang

4 June 1983
20:30

Report

Singapore	33–82	Malaysia

Gay World Stadium, Geylang

=== Final standings ===
Rank	Team
1st place, gold medalist(s)	Malaysia
2nd place, silver medalist(s)	Philippines
3rd place, bronze medalist(s)	Singapore
4	Thailand
5	Indonesia

Preceded by 1981	Basketball at the Southeast Asian Games; 1983	Succeeded by 1985
