= Basketball at the 1997 SEA Games =

11th SEA Games Basketball Tournament
- Jakarta 1997

Tournament details
- SEA Games: 1997 SEA Games
- Host nation: Indonesia
- City: Jakarta
- Venue: Senayan Basketball Sports Hall
- Duration: 12–18 October 1997

Men's tournament
- Teams: 4
Medals
Gold medalists	Philippines
Silver medalists	Malaysia
Bronze medalists	Thailand

Women's tournament
- Teams: 5
Medals
Gold medalists	Malaysia
Silver medalists	Thailand
Bronze medalists	Indonesia

Tournaments
← Chiang Mai 1995	Bandar Seri Begawan 1999 →

Basketball at the 1997 SEA Games was held from 12 to 18 October 1997 in Senayan, Central Jakarta, Indonesia. This edition featured both tournaments for men's and women's team. All matches were held in Senayan Basketball Sports Hall.

The Philippines were able to defend their title by defeating their round robin dementors and last edition's bronze medallists Malaysia in the championship match, 96–86, for their fourth consecutive title since 1991 and their 10th overall title. Meanwhile, last edition's silver medallists Thailand was relegated to third place after besting the hosts Indonesia, 68–57.

In the women's event, Malaysia reclaimed the championship by defeating the defending champions Thailand, 67–58 for their ninth overall title. Indonesia, meanwhile, salvaged the solitary podium finish by pulling a miraculous come-from-behind 68–65 win against the Philippines for the bronze.

== Tournament format ==
The competition format for both men's and women's event calls for the top two teams after the single round robin to face in the championship match, whereas third and fourth-place finishers per division will playoff for the bronze medal.

== Men's tournament ==
=== Participating nations ===
- Indonesia
- Malaysia
- Philippines
- Thailand

=== Results ===
Qualified to the Gold Medal Match
Qualified to the Bronze Medal Match

Team	Pts.	W	L	PF	PA	PD
Philippines	5	2	1	157	150	+7
Malaysia	2	1	0	76	72	+4
Indonesia	1	0	1	74	85	–11
Thailand	1	0	1			

12 October 1997

Thailand	vs.	Malaysia

Senayan Basketball Sports Hall, Jakarta

12 October 1997

Report

Philippines	85–74	Indonesia

Senayan Basketball Sports Hall, Jakarta

14 October 1997

Philippines	W–L	Thailand

Senayan Basketball Sports Hall, Jakarta

14 October 1997

Malaysia	vs.	Indonesia

Senayan Basketball Sports Hall, Jakarta

16 October 1997

Report

Malaysia	76–72	Philippines

Senayan Basketball Sports Hall, Jakarta

16 October 1997

Thailand	vs.	Indonesia

Senayan Basketball Sports Hall, Jakarta

==== Bronze medal match ====
18 October 1997

Report

Thailand	68–57	Indonesia

Senayan Basketball Sports Hall, Jakarta

==== Gold medal match ====
18 October 1997
19:15

Report

Philippines	96–86	Malaysia
Scoring by half: 45−39, 51−47

Senayan Basketball Sports Hall, Jakarta

== Women's tournament ==
=== Participating nations ===
- Indonesia
- Malaysia
- Philippines
- Thailand
- Vietnam

==== Bronze medal match ====
18 October 1997

Report

Indonesia	68–65	Philippines

Senayan Basketball Sports Hall, Jakarta

==== Gold medal match ====
18 October 1997
17:30

Report

Malaysia	67–58	Thailand

Senayan Basketball Sports Hall, Jakarta

Preceded by 1995	Basketball at the SEA Games; 1997 SEA Games	Succeeded by 1999
