= 1972 ABC Championship for Women =

1972 FIBA Women's Asia Cup
4th Asian Women's Basketball Championship

Tournament details
- Host country: Republic of China
- Dates: November 18–26
- Teams: 5 (from all Asian federations)
- Venue: 1 (in 1 host city)

Final positions
- Champions: South Korea (3rd title)

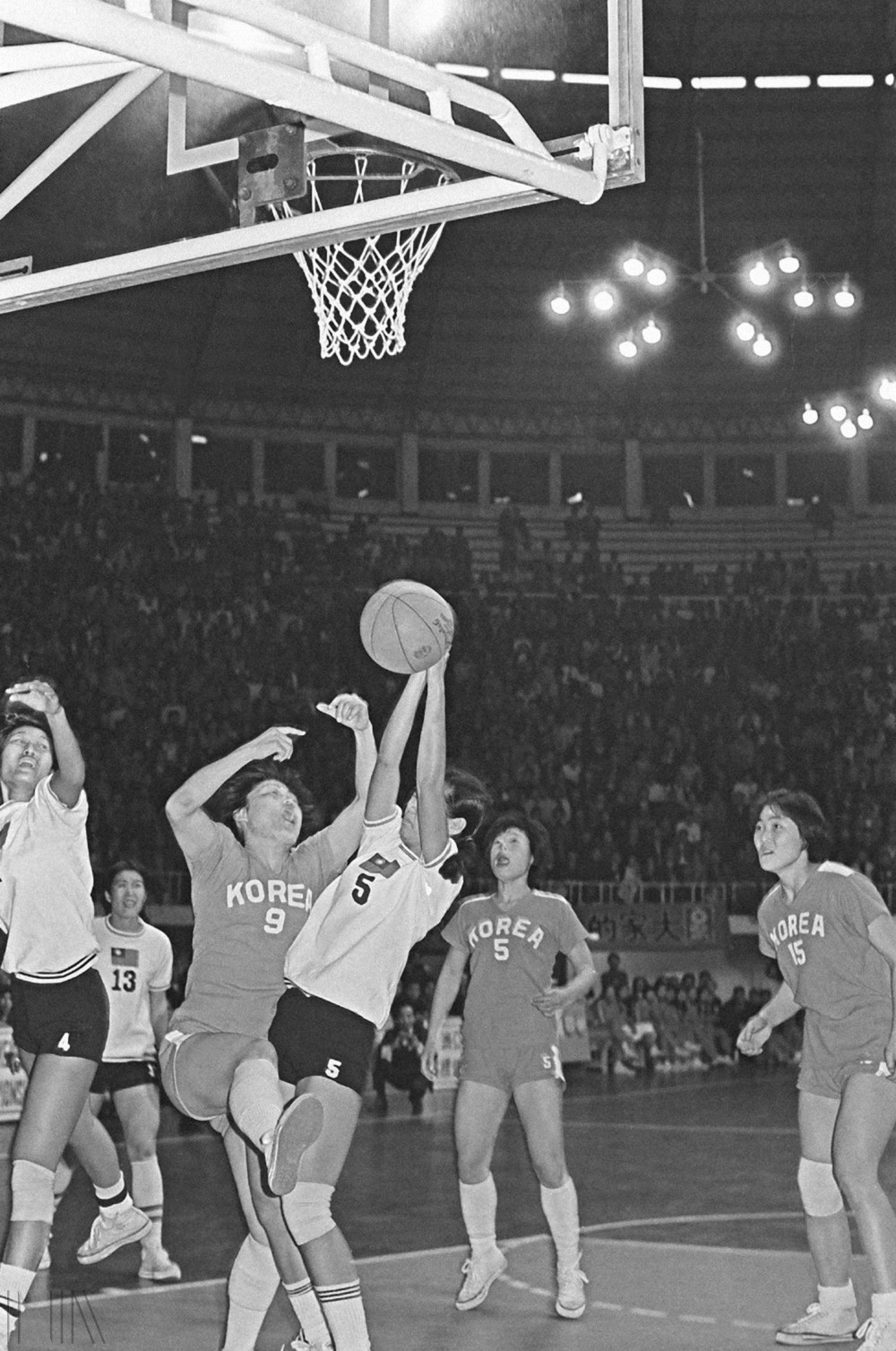
South Korea v.s Taiwan in the preliminary round

The 1972 Asian Basketball Confederation Championship for Women were held in Taipei, Republic of China.

== Preliminary round ==
Team	Pld	W	L	PF	PA	PD	Pts
South Korea	4	4	0	386	128	+258	8
Taiwan	4	3	1	342	194	+148	7
Thailand	4	2	2	189	281	−92	6
Indonesia	4	1	3	217	324	−107	5
Hong Kong	4	0	4	141	348	−207	4

November 18

Taiwan	94–38	Hong Kong
Scoring by half: 51–14, 43–24

Taipei

November 18

South Korea	106–17	Thailand
Scoring by half: 59–6, 47–11

Taipei

November 19

Hong Kong	39–68	Thailand
Scoring by half: 22–40, 17–28

Taipei

November 19

Indonesia	55–106	Taiwan
Scoring by half: 24–53, 31–53

Taipei

November 20

Hong Kong	18–111	South Korea
Scoring by half: 12–53, 6–58

Taipei

November 20

Indonesia	51–68	Thailand
Scoring by half: 22–25, 29–43

Taipei

November 22

Taiwan	85–36	Thailand
Scoring by half: 40–23, 45–13

Taipei

November 22

Indonesia	36–104	South Korea
Scoring by half: 14–54, 22–50

Taipei

November 23

Hong Kong	46–75	Indonesia
Scoring by half: 13–41, 33–34

Taipei

November 23

Taiwan	57–65	South Korea
Scoring by half: 29–31, 28–34

Taipei

== Final round ==
Semifinals
November 25
South Korea	120
Indonesia	35
November 25
Taiwan	108
Thailand	29

Final
November 26
South Korea	66
Taiwan	51
3rd place
November 26
Indonesia	54
Thailand	70

=== Semifinals ===
November 25

South Korea	120–35	Indonesia
Scoring by half: 59–17, 61–18

Taipei

November 25

Taiwan	108–29	Thailand
Scoring by half: 42–19, 66–10

Taipei

=== 3rd place ===
November 26

Indonesia	54–70	Thailand
Scoring by half: 34–33, 20–37

Taipei

=== Final ===
November 26

South Korea	66–51	Taiwan
Scoring by half: 26–22, 40–29

Taipei

== Final standing ==
Rank	Team	Record
1st place, gold medalist(s)	South Korea	6–0
2nd place, silver medalist(s)	Taiwan	4–2
3rd place, bronze medalist(s)	Thailand	3–3
4	Indonesia	1–5
5	Hong Kong	0–4

== Awards ==
1972 Asian champions

South Korea
Third title

== See also ==
- List of sporting events in Taiwan
