= Basketball at the 1977 SEA Games =

1st SEA Games Basketball Tournament
- Kuala Lumpur 1977

Tournament details
- SEA Games: 1977 SEA Games
- Host nation: Malaysia
- City: Kuala Lumpur
- Venue: Stadium Negara
- Duration: 21–25 November

Men's tournament
- Teams: 5
Medals
Gold medalists	Philippines
Silver medalists	Malaysia
Bronze medalists	Thailand

Women's tournament
- Teams: 4
Medals
Gold medalists	Malaysia
Silver medalists	Thailand
Bronze medalists	Singapore

Tournaments
	Jakarta 1979 →

The basketball tournament at the 1977 SEA Games took place from November 21–25, 1977, at Stadium Negara in Kuala Lumpur.

== Tournament format ==
Both the men's and women's tournament were in round robin format, where the top team at the end of the single round won the gold medal, and the next two teams the silver and bronze, respectively.

== Men's tournament ==
=== Participating nations ===
- Indonesia
- Malaysia
- Philippines (Anthony Dasalla, Bernardo Carpio, Jaime Javier, Eleazar Capacio, Jaime Manansala, Renato Lobo, Ramon Cruz, Angelito Ladores, Matthew Gaston, Alex Clarino, Joseph Herrera and Paul Velasco) Head Coach: Honesto Mayoralgo
- Singapore
- Thailand

=== Results ===
Pos	Team	Pld	W	L	PF	PA	PD	Pts	Final Result
1	Philippines	3	2	1	293	237	+56	5 (Note: Philippines 3 Pts, +20 PD; Malaysia 3 Pts, +2 PD; Thailand 3 Pts, −22 PD)	Gold medal
2	Malaysia (H)	3	2	1	301	277	+24	5	Silver medal
3	Thailand	3	2	1	257	269	−12	5	Bronze medal
4	Singapore	3	0	3	226	294	−68	3	

Rules for classification: (1) Tournament points, (2) Head-to-head tournament points, (3) Head-to-head goal average, (4) Overall goal average, (5) Drawing of lots
(H) Hosts
Notes:

21 November 1977
21:00

Report

Malaysia	101–79	Singapore
Scoring by half: 44–35, 57–44

Stadium Negara, Kuala Lumpur

22 November 1977
15:30

Report

Singapore	69–105	Philippines
Scoring by half: 34–52, 35–53

Stadium Negara, Kuala Lumpur

22 November 1977
17:00

Results

Malaysia	99–102 (OT)	Thailand
Scoring by half: 40–45, 59–54 Overtime: 0–3

Stadium Negara, Kuala Lumpur

23 November 1977
17:00

Results

Thailand	67–92	Philippines

Stadium Negara, Kuala Lumpur

25 November 1977
16:30

Results

Singapore	78–88	Thailand

Stadium Negara, Kuala Lumpur

25 November 1977
21:00

Results

Philippines	96–101	Malaysia

Stadium Negara, Kuala Lumpur

== Women's tournament ==
=== Participating nations ===
- Indonesia
- Malaysia
- Singapore
- Thailand

=== Results ===
Pos	Team	Pld	W	L	PF	PA	PD	Pts	Final Result
1	Malaysia (H)	3	3	0	251	196	+55	6	Gold medal
2	Thailand	3	2	1	231	214	+17	5	Silver medal
3	Singapore	3	1	2	161	185	−24	4	Bronze medal
4	Indonesia	3	0	3	172	220	−48	3	

Rules for classification: (1) Tournament points, (2) Head-to-head tournament points, (3) Head-to-head goal average, (4) Overall goal average, (5) Drawing of lots
(H) Hosts

21 November 1977
19:30

Results

Malaysia	84–73	Indonesia
Scoring by half: 50–34, 34–39

Stadium Negara, Kuala Lumpur

22 November 1977
14:00

Report Results

Thailand	71–62	Singapore
Scoring by half: 31–27, 40–35

Stadium Negara, Kuala Lumpur

23 November 1977
14:00

Results

Thailand	86–61	Indonesia

Stadium Negara, Kuala Lumpur

23 November 1977
15:30

Report Results

Malaysia	76–49	Singapore
Scoring by half: 45–25, 31–24

Stadium Negara, Kuala Lumpur

25 November 1977
15:00

Results

Singapore	50–38	Indonesia

Stadium Negara, Kuala Lumpur

25 November 1977
19:30

Results

Malaysia	91–74	Thailand

Stadium Negara, Kuala Lumpur

== Medal table ==
* Host nation (Malaysia)

Rank	Nation	Gold	Silver	Bronze	Total
1	Malaysia*	1	1	0	2
2	Philippines	1	0	0	1
3	Thailand	0	1	1	2
4	Singapore	0	0	1	1
5	Indonesia	0	0	0	0
Totals (5 entries)		2	2	2	6

Preceded by	Basketball at the SEA Games; 1977	Succeeded by 1979
