= Basketball at the 2003 SEA Games =

14th SEA Games Basketball Tournament
- Ho Chi Minh City 2003

Tournament details
- SEA Games: 2003 SEA Games
- Host nation: Vietnam
- City: Ho Chi Minh City
- Venue: Army Sports Gymnasium
- Duration: 6–13 December 2003

Men's tournament
- Teams: 6
Medals
Gold medalists	Philippines
Silver medalists	Thailand
Bronze medalists	Malaysia

Women's tournament
- Teams: 6
Medals
Gold medalists	Malaysia
Silver medalists	Singapore
Bronze medalists	Philippines

Tournaments
← Kuala Lumpur 2001	Nakhon Ratchasima 2007 →

Basketball at the 2003 SEA Games was held from 7 to 13 December 2003 in Army Sports Gymnasium, Ho Chi Minh City, Vietnam. This edition featured both tournaments for men's and women's team.

The Philippines team swept all of their assignments en route to their 13th overall men's title and seventh consecutive since the 1991 Games, while Malaysia, although they lost their final game against Thailand on the final day of the tournament, still managed to annex their third straight women's title since the 1997 edition, and their 10th title overall.

This edition features six countries and both the men's and women's division were well represented at the Games.

== Men's tournament ==
=== Participating nations ===
- Indonesia
- Malaysia
- Philippines
- Singapore
- Thailand
- Vietnam

=== Results ===
Pos	Team	Pld	W	L	PF	PA	PD	Pts	Final Result
1	Philippines	5	5	0	464	289	+175	10	Gold medal
2	Thailand	5	4	1	397	370	+27	9	Silver medal
3	Malaysia	5	3	2	323	268	+55	8	Bronze medal
4	Singapore	5	2	3	333	380	−47	7	
5	Indonesia	5	1	4	366	361	+5	6	
6	Vietnam (H)	5	0	5	300	486	−186	5	

Rules for classification: (1) Tournament points, (2) Head-to-head tournament points, (3) Head-to-head goal average, (4) Overall goal average, (5) Drawing of lots
(H) Hosts

6 December 2003

Singapore	68–64	Indonesia

Army Sport Gymnasium, Ho Chi Minh City

6 December 2003

Vietnam	56–98	Malaysia

Army Sport Gymnasium, Ho Chi Minh City

7 December 2003

Malaysia	79–68	Indonesia

Army Sport Gymnasium, Ho Chi Minh City

7 December 2003
20:30

Report

Philippines	85–49	Thailand
Scoring by quarter: 28–18, 21–11, 24–6, 12–14
Pts: de Ocampo 18		Pts: Chintanasid 16

Army Sport Gymnasium, Ho Chi Minh City

8 December 2003

Indonesia	91–62	Vietnam

Army Sport Gymnasium, Ho Chi Minh City

8 December 2003

Thailand	89–67	Singapore

Army Sport Gymnasium, Ho Chi Minh City

9 December 2003
16:30

Report

Vietnam	53–117	Philippines
Scoring by quarter: 12–34, 8–32, 17–27, 16–24
Pts: To 15		Pts: Yap, Sotto 17

Army Sport Gymnasium, Ho Chi Minh City

9 December 2003

Singapore	65–72	Malaysia

Army Sport Gymnasium, Ho Chi Minh City

10 December 2003
16:30

Report

Philippines	97–56	Singapore
Scoring by quarter: 25–9, 31–9, 24–23, 17–15
Pts: de Ocampo 17		Pts: Koh M.K. 29

Army Sport Gymnasium, Ho Chi Minh City

10 December 2003
20:30

Thailand	77–73	Indonesia

Army Sport Gymnasium, Ho Chi Minh City

11 December 2003
16:30

Indonesia	70–75	Philippines
Scoring by quarter: 22–11, 17–23, 9–26, 24–15
Pts: Wuysang 29		Pts: Yap 22

Army Sport Gymnasium, Ho Chi Minh City

11 December 2003

Malaysia	74–79	Thailand

Army Sport Gymnasium, Ho Chi Minh City

12 December 2003

Vietnam	58–77	Singapore

Army Sport Gymnasium, Ho Chi Minh City

13 December 2003
11:00

Philippines	90–61	Malaysia
Scoring by quarter: 26–8, 19–18, 31–9, 14–26
Pts: Yap 22

Army Sport Gymnasium, Ho Chi Minh City

13 December 2003

Thailand	103–71	Vietnam

Army Sport Gymnasium, Ho Chi Minh City

== Women's tournament ==
=== Participating nations ===
- Indonesia
- Malaysia
- Philippines
- Singapore
- Thailand
- Vietnam

=== Results ===
Pos	Team	Pld	W	L	PF	PA	PD	Pts	Final Result
1	Malaysia	5	4	1	405	290	+115	9 (Note: Head-to-head tournament points Malaysia 2, Singapore 1)	Gold medal
2	Singapore	5	4	1	335	288	+47	9	Silver medal
3	Philippines	5	3	2	314	288	+26	8 (Note: Head-to-head tournament points Philippines 2, Thailand 1)	Bronze medal
4	Thailand	5	3	2	367	335	+32	8	
5	Indonesia	5	1	4	283	365	−82	6	
6	Vietnam (H)	5	0	5	290	428	−138	5	

Rules for classification: (1) Tournament points, (2) Head-to-head tournament points, (3) Head-to-head goal average, (4) Overall goal average, (5) Drawing of lots
(H) Hosts
Notes:

6 December 2003

Indonesia	44–70	Singapore

Army Sport Gymnasium, Ho Chi Minh City

7 December 2003

Malaysia	93–45	Vietnam

Army Sport Gymnasium, Ho Chi Minh City

7 December 2003
18:30

Report

Philippines	84–82	Thailand

Army Sport Gymnasium, Ho Chi Minh City

December 2003

Vietnam	75–83	Indonesia

Army Sport Gymnasium, Ho Chi Minh City

December 2003

Thailand	56–70	Singapore

Army Sport Gymnasium, Ho Chi Minh City

9 December 2003
14:30

Malaysia	65–54	Philippines

Army Sport Gymnasium, Ho Chi Minh City

December 2003

Indonesia	57–70	Thailand

Army Sport Gymnasium, Ho Chi Minh City

10 December 2003
14:30

Report

Philippines	81–50	Vietnam
Scoring by quarter: 22–16, 24–6, 19–11, 16–17
Pts: Enriquez 15

Army Sport Gymnasium, Ho Chi Minh City

10 December 2003
18:30

Singapore	65–83	Malaysia

Army Sport Gymnasium, Ho Chi Minh City

11 December 2003
14:30

Philippines	55–47	Indonesia
Scoring by quarter: 19–8, 9–12, 14–15, 13–12
Pts: Vega 14

Army Sport Gymnasium, Ho Chi Minh City

December 2003

Vietnam	55–85	Thailand

Army Sport Gymnasium, Ho Chi Minh City

December 2003

Vietnam	65–86	Singapore

Army Sport Gymnasium, Ho Chi Minh City

December 2003

Malaysia	95–52	Indonesia

Army Sport Gymnasium, Ho Chi Minh City

13 December 2003
09:00

Singapore	44–40	Philippines
Scoring by quarter: 9–10, 6–9, 13–11, 16–10

Army Sport Gymnasium, Ho Chi Minh City

13 December 2003
13:00

Thailand	74–69	Malaysia

Army Sport Gymnasium, Ho Chi Minh City

Preceded by 2001	Basketball at the SEA Games; 2003 SEA Games	Succeeded by (not held on 2005); 2007
