= Basketball at the 1981 SEA Games =

3rd SEA Games Basketball Tournament
- Manila 1981

Tournament details
- SEA Games: 1981 SEA Games
- Host nation: Philippines
- City: Manila
- Venue: Rizal Memorial Coliseum
- Duration: 7–13 December

Men's tournament
- Teams: 4
Medals
Gold medalists	Philippines
Silver medalists	Malaysia
Bronze medalists	Thailand

Women's tournament
- Teams: 5
Medals
Gold medalists	Malaysia
Silver medalists	Philippines
Bronze medalists	Thailand

Tournaments
← Jakarta 1979	Singapore 1983 →

The basketball tournament at the 1981 SEA Games took place from 7 to 13 December 1981. This edition of the tournament featured both men's and women's tournament. All matches took place at the Rizal Memorial Coliseum in Manila.

The hosts Philippines were able to regain the men's championship title by blasting the defending champions Malaysia in the Gold Medal Match, 91–74, to avenge their preliminary loss to the same team. Meanwhile, Thailand edged out Singapore in the third place battle, 99–90, to take home the Bronze Medal.

In the women's division, Malaysia asserted their supremacy by defeating the hosts the Philippines in the Gold Medal Match, 52–42, to annex their third straight championship. Thailand knocked off Singapore in the third place battle, 59–46, to win the Bronze Medal.

== Tournament format ==
The competition format for both men's and women's event calls for the top two teams after the single round robin to face in the championship match. The third and fourth-placed teams, on the other hand, will battle for the Bronze Medal.

== Men's tournament ==
=== Participating nations ===
- Malaysia
- Philippines
- Singapore
- Thailand

=== Results ===
Pos	Team	Pld	W	L	PF	PA	PD	Pts	Qualification
1	Philippines (H)	3	2	1	242	211	+31	5 (Note: 1–1; 1.1000)	Qualified to the Gold Medal Match
2	Malaysia	3	2	1	244	228	+16	5 (Note: 1–1; 0.9874)	Qualified to the Gold Medal Match
3	Thailand	3	2	1	237	234	+3	5 (Note: 1–1; 0.9231)	Qualified to the Bronze Medal Match
4	Singapore	3	0	3	195	245	−50	3	Qualified to the Bronze Medal Match

Rules for classification: (1) Tournament points, (2) Head-to-head tournament points, (3) Head-to-head goal average, (4) Overall goal average, (5) Drawing of lots
(H) Hosts
Notes:

7 December 1981

Results

Malaysia	80–83	Thailand

Rizal Memorial Coliseum, Manila

7 December 1981

Results

Singapore	61–77	Philippines

Rizal Memorial Coliseum, Manila

8 December 1981

Results

Thailand	81–65	Singapore

Rizal Memorial Coliseum, Manila

9 December 1981

Results

Philippines	76–77	Malaysia

Rizal Memorial Coliseum, Manila

11 December 1981

Results

Philippines	89–73	Thailand

Rizal Memorial Coliseum, Manila

12 December 1981

Results

Singapore	69–87	Malaysia

Rizal Memorial Coliseum, Manila

=== Bronze medal match ===
13 December 1981

Results

Singapore	90–99	Thailand

Rizal Memorial Coliseum, Manila

=== Gold medal match ===
13 December 1981

Results

Philippines	91–74	Malaysia

Rizal Memorial Coliseum, Manila

=== Final standings ===
Rank	Team
1st place, gold medalist(s)	Philippines
2nd place, silver medalist(s)	Malaysia
3rd place, bronze medalist(s)	Thailand
4	Singapore

== Women's tournament ==
=== Participating nations ===
- Indonesia
- Malaysia
- Philippines
- Singapore
- Thailand

=== Results ===
Pos	Team	Pld	W	L	PF	PA	PD	Pts	Qualification
1	Malaysia	4	4	0	208	159	+49	8	Qualified to the Gold Medal Match
2	Philippines (H)	4	3	1	265	219	+46	7	Qualified to the Gold Medal Match
3	Thailand	4	2	2	225	237	−12	6	Qualified to the Bronze Medal Match
4	Singapore	4	1	3	159	179	−20	5	Qualified to the Bronze Medal Match
5	Indonesia	4	0	4	206	269	−63	4	

Rules for classification: (1) Tournament points, (2) Head-to-head tournament points, (3) Head-to-head goal average, (4) Overall goal average, (5) Drawing of lots
(H) Hosts

7 December 1981

Results

Singapore	54–61	Thailand

Rizal Memorial Coliseum, Manila

7 December 1981

Results

Philippines	82–47	Indonesia

Rizal Memorial Coliseum, Manila

8 December 1981

Results

Indonesia	55–66	Malaysia

Rizal Memorial Coliseum, Manila

8 December 1981

Results

Singapore	47–64	Philippines

Rizal Memorial Coliseum, Manila

9 December 1981

Malaysia	W–L	Singapore

Rizal Memorial Coliseum, Manila

9 December 1981

Results

Philippines	60–56	Thailand

Rizal Memorial Coliseum, Manila

11 December 1981

Results

Thailand	63–50	Indonesia

Rizal Memorial Coliseum, Manila

11 December 1981

Results

Malaysia	69–59	Philippines

Rizal Memorial Coliseum, Manila

12 December 1981
14:00

Results

Singapore	58–54	Indonesia

Rizal Memorial Coliseum, Manila

12 December 1981
15:30

Results

Thailand	45–73	Malaysia

Rizal Memorial Coliseum, Manila

=== Bronze medal match ===
13 December 1981

Results

Singapore	46–59	Thailand

Rizal Memorial Coliseum, Manila

=== Gold medal match ===
13 December 1981

Results

Philippines	42–52	Malaysia

Rizal Memorial Coliseum, Manila

=== Final standings ===
Rank	Team
1st place, gold medalist(s)	Malaysia
2nd place, silver medalist(s)	Philippines
3rd place, bronze medalist(s)	Thailand
4	Singapore
5	Indonesia

Preceded by 1979	Basketball at the Southeast Asian Games; 1981	Succeeded by 1983
