= List of V-League (Philippines) conference results =

The V-League relaunched in 2022 as a result of the Premier Volleyball League turning into a professional league. The V-League serves as a revival of the former Shakey's V-League and replaced the PVL's Collegiate Conference while also adding a men's division which was previously held in Spikers' Turf. In 2025, V-League Visayas was launched to cater to Visayas-based teams. The following are the results of each season in both V-League and V-League Visayas.

== V-League Collegiate Challenge ==
=== Results ===
Season	Division	1st	2nd	3rd	4th	5th	6th	7th	8th	9th	10th	11th	12th
2022	Men's	NU Bulldogs	UST Growling Tigers	Perpetual Altas	Ateneo Blue Eagles	San Beda Red Lions	FEU Tamaraws	De La Salle Green Archers	Arellano Chiefs	UP Fighting Maroons	Adamson Soaring Falcons	Benilde Blazers	San Sebastian Stags
2022	Women's	Ateneo Lady Eagles	Adamson Lady Falcons	Benilde Lady Blazers	UP Lady Maroons	FEU Lady Tamaraws	UST Tigresses	San Sebastian Lady Stags	San Beda Red Lionesses	–	–	–	–
2023	Men's	De La Salle Green Archers	UST Growling Tigers	FEU Tamaraws	Ateneo Blue Eagles	NU Bulldogs	Perpetual Altas	EAC Generals	San Beda Red Lions	–	–	–	–
2023	Women's	Benilde Lady Blazers	FEU Lady Tamaraws	UE Lady Warriors	Perpetual Lady Altas	Enderun Lady Titans	Lyceum Lady Pirates	Mapúa Lady Cardinals	San Sebastian Stags	–	–	–	–
2024	Men's	FEU Tamaraws	De La Salle Green Archers	NU Bulldogs	UST Growling Tigers	Perpetual Altas	Letran Knights	Ateneo Blue Eagles	EAC Generals	–	–	–	–
2024	Women's	UST Tigresses	FEU Lady Tamaraws	UE Lady Warriors	Benilde Lady Blazers	UP Lady Maroons	Letran Lady Knights	Lyceum Lady Pirates	–	–	–	–	–

=== Awards ===
Season	Division	Finals MVP	Conference MVP	1st Best Outside Spiker	2nd Best Outside Spiker	1st Best Middle Blocker	2nd Best Middle Blocker	Best Opposite Spiker	Best Setter	Best Libero
2022	Men's	Angelo Nicolas Almendras	Angelo Nicolas Almendras	Angelo Nicolas Almendras	Mhicaelo Buddin	Jettli Gopio	Obed Mukaba	Kennedy Batas	Joshua Retamar	John Phillip Pepito
2022	Women's	Faith Janine Shirley Nisperos	Faith Janine Shirley Nisperos	Faith Janine Shirley Nisperos	Vanessa Gandler	Zamantha Nolasco	Michelle Gamit	Trisha Gayle Tubu	Louie Romero	Roma Mae Doromal
2023	Men's	Noel Michael Kampton	Josh Ybañez	Noel Michael Kampton	Rey Miguel De Vega	Lirick Mendoza	Rainier Flor	John Mark Ronquillo	Diogenes Poquita III	Menard Guerrero
2023	Women's	Jhasmine Gayle Pascual	Mary Rhose Dapol	Jade Gentapa	Kiesha Dazzie Bedonia	Zamantha Nolasco	Riza Nogales	Jhasmine Gayle Pascual	Christine Ubaldo	Marian Tracy Andal
2024	Men's	Zhydryx Saavedra	Rey Miguel De Vega	Jerold Talisayan	Chris Hernandez	Edlyn Colinares	Joshua Magalaman	Zhydryx Saavedra	Jerico Adajar	Menard Guerrero
2024	Women's	Ma. Cassandra Rae Carballo	Angeline Poyos	Wielyn Estoque	Chenie Tagaod	Zamantha Nolasco	Mary Banagua	Regina Jurado	Ma. Cassandra Rae Carballo	Ma. Bernadett Pepito

== V-League Visayas ==
=== Results ===
Season	Division	1st	2nd	3rd	4th	5th	6th
2025	Men's	UC Webmasters	USPF Panthers	USC Warriors	CIT-U Wildcats	USJ–R Jaguars	UP Cebu Fighting Maroons
2025	Women's	USJ–R Lady Jaguars	USC Lady Warriors	UC Lady Webmasters	CIT-U Lady Wildcats	USPF Lady Panthers	UP Cebu Fighting Maroons

== See also ==
- List of Premier Volleyball League conference results
- List of Shakey's V-League conference results
- List of Spikers' Turf conference results
