= V-League Visayas =

Regional volleyball league in Visayas

- Current season, competition or edition: 2026 V-League Visayas season
- Sport: Volleyball
- Founded: 2025
- Founder: Sports Vision
- Motto: Where it all started!
- No. of teams: M: 6 W: 4
- Country: Philippines
- Continent: AVC (Asia)
- Most recent champions: M: CPU Golden Lions; W: CPU Golden Lions
- Most titles: M: UC; CPU (1 title each); W: USJ-R; CPU (1 title each)
- Streaming partner: Pilipinas Live
- Website: vleague.ph

V-League Visayas is a regional collegiate volleyball league in the Philippines organized by Sports Vision for teams based in Visayas. The league was established in 2025 as a regional counterpart to the V-League in Metro Manila.

In 2025, The league is composed of six teams in both women's and men's divisions, all based in Cebu City and are affiliated with Cebu Schools Athletic Foundation, Inc. (CESAFI)

In 2026, The league has expanded with the Panay-Negros tournament consists of six teams (men's) & four teams (women's) from the Panay-Negros Island Region area affiliated with Iloilo-PRISAA and NOPSSCEA

== History ==
=== Background ===
In 2022, the Sports Vision established the V-League, a revival of the former Shakey's V-League that lasted from 2004 to 2016. Historically, teams from CESAFI have competed in the SVL, with the last time being the 2014 SVL 1st Conference, which saw Southwestern University's Lady Cobras take part.

V-League Visayas was first announced on March 21, 2025 with Ken Ucang as its commissioner. Sports Vision president Ricky Palou stated that the tournament will "complement the CESAFI tournaments by giving players more opportunities to excel." Multiple schools across Cebu City have backed and expressed support for the regional league.

=== Launch ===
The inaugural season of V-League Visayas will start on July 6, 2025. It will feature six CESAFI teams who will compete in both the women's and men's divisions.

== Teams ==
=== 2026 Teams ===
These are the teams who competed in the 2nd season of V-League Visayas.

Team	School	Collegiate League
Men's division
ACC Archangels	Aklan Catholic College	None
CPU Golden Lions	Central Philippine University	Iloilo PRISAA
PCC Sweet Spikers	Passi City College	Iloilo PRISAA
UNO-R Rams	University of Negros Occidental-Recoletos	NOPSSCEA
USA Golden Eagles	University of San Agustin - Iloilo	Iloilo PRISAA
USLS Stingers	University of St. La Salle	NOPSSCEA
Women's division
CPU Golden Lions	Central Philippine University	Iloilo PRISAA
UNO-R Lady Rams	University of Negros Occidental-Recoletos	NOPSSCEA
USA Golden Eagles	University of San Agustin - Iloilo	Iloilo PRISAA
USLS Lady Stingers	University of St. La Salle	NOPSSCEA

=== 2025 Teams ===
These are the teams who competed in the inaugural season of V-League Visayas.

Team	School	Collegiate League
Men's division
CIT-U Wildcats	Cebu Institute of Technology – University	CESAFI
UC Webmasters	University of Cebu	CESAFI
USC Warriors	University of San Carlos	CESAFI
USJ–R Jaguars	University of San Jose–Recoletos	CESAFI
USPF Panthers	University of Southern Philippines Foundation	CESAFI
UP Cebu Fighting Maroons	University of the Philippines Cebu	CESAFI
Women's division
CIT-U Lady Wildcats	Cebu Institute of Technology – University	CESAFI
UC Lady Webmasters	University of Cebu	CESAFI
USC Lady Warriors	University of San Carlos	CESAFI
USJ–R Lady Jaguars	University of San Jose–Recoletos	CESAFI
USPF Lady Panthers	University of Southern Philippines Foundation	CESAFI
UP Cebu Fighting Maroons	University of the Philippines Cebu	CESAFI

== Result summary ==
Season	Men's division			Women's division		
Season	Champions	Runners-up	Third place	Champions	Runners-up	Third place
2025	UC Webmasters	USPF Panthers	USC Warriors	USJ–R Lady Jaguars	USC Lady Warriors	UC Lady Webmasters
2026	CPU Golden Lions	USA Golden Eagles	UNO-R Rams	CPU Golden Lions	USLS Lady Stingers	UNO-R Lady Rams

== Participating schools ==
Key
1st	Indicates a team finished as the champions during the conference
2nd	Indicates a team finished as the runners-up during the conference
3rd	Indicates a team finished as the third placer during the conference
4th	Indicates a team finished as the fourth placer during the conference
•	Indicates a team did not participate during the conference
WD	Indicates a team initially participated during the conference but later withdrew

=== Men's division ===
Team	2025	2026
ACC Archangels	•	5th
CIT-U Wildcats	4th	•
CPU Golden Lions	•	1st
PCC Sweet Spikers	•	6th
UC Webmasters	1st	•
UNO-R Rams	•	3rd
USA Golden Eagles	•	2nd
USC Warriors	3rd	•
USJ-R Jaguars	5th	•
USLS Stingers	•	4th
USPF Panthers	2nd	•
UP Cebu Fighting Maroons	6th	•

=== Women's division ===
Team	2025	2026
CIT-U Lady Wildcats	4th	•
CPU Golden Lions	•	1st
UC Lady Webmasters	3rd	•
UNO-R Lady Rams	•	3rd
USA Golden Eagles	•	4th
USC Lady Warriors	2nd	•
USJ-R Lady Jaguars	1st	•
USLS Lady Stingers	•	2nd
USPF Lady Panthers	5th	•
UP Cebu Fighting Maroons	6th	•

== Conference MVP by edition ==
=== Men ===
- 2025 – June Yungco (USC)
- 2026 – James Galusong (USA)

=== Women ===
- 2025 – Rachel Tecson (USJ-R)
- 2026 – Rica Gaile Silvestre (CPU)

== See also ==
- V-League (Philippines)
