= 2026 V-League Visayas season =

2nd season of V-League Visayas

- League: V-League Visayas
- Sport: Volleyball
- Duration: August 1–22, 2026
- Matches: M: 16; W: 10
- Teams: M: 6 W: 4
- Season MVP: M James Galusong (USA); W Rica Gaile Silvestre (CPU)
- Men's champions: CPU Golden Lions
- Men's runners-up: USA Golden Eagles
- Women's champions: CPU Golden Lions
- Women's runners-up: USLS Lady Stingers
- Finals MVP: M Billy Joe Onte (CPU); W Arianne Lei Kew (CPU)

V-League Visayas seasons
- ← 2025 2027 →

The 2026 V-League Visayas season was the second season of V-League Visayas. The season started from August 1 and ended on August 22, 2026 and features six teams (men's) & four teams (women's), all based in the Panay-Negros Island Region area and affiliated with Iloilo PRISAA and NOPSSCEA.

== Teams ==
These are the teams who will compete for the 2nd season of V-League Visayas.

Team	School	Collegiate League
Women's division
CPU Golden Lions	Central Philippine University	Iloilo PRISAA
UNO-R Lady Rams	University of Negros Occidental-Recoletos	NOPSSCEA
USA Golden Eagles	University of San Agustin - Iloilo	Iloilo PRISAA
USLS Lady Stingers	University of St. La Salle	NOPSSCEA

== Arena ==
Preliminaries and Championship
Passi, Iloilo
City of Passi Arena

== Women's tournament ==
- All times are Philippine Standard Time (UTC+8:00).

=== Preliminary round ===
Pos	Team	Pld	W	L	Pts	SW	SL	SR	SPW	SPL	SPR	Qualification
1	CPU Golden Lions	3	3	0	9	9	1	9.000	0	0	—	Championship
2	USLS Lady Stingers	3	2	1	6	6	4	1.500	0	0	—	Championship
3	UNO-R Lady Rams	3	1	2	4	5	7	0.714	0	0	—	
4	USA Golden Eagles	3	0	3	0	1	9	0.111	0	0	—	

Updated to match(es) played on August 22, 2026. Source: V-League

==== Match results ====
Date	Time	Venue		Score		Set 1	Set 2	Set 3	Set 4	Set 5	Total	Report
Aug 01	09:00		USLS Lady Stingers	3–0	USA Golden Eagles							
Aug 01	11:00		CPU Golden Lions	3–1	UNO-R Lady Rams							
Aug 08	15:00		USLS Lady Stingers	0–3	CPU Golden Lions							
Aug 08	17:00		UNO-R Lady Rams	3–1	USA Golden Eagles							
Aug 15	15:00		CPU Golden Lions	3–0	USA Golden Eagles							
Aug 15	17:00		UNO-R Lady Rams	1–3	USLS Lady Stingers							

=== Third place match ===
Date	Time	Venue		Score		Set 1	Set 2	Set 3	Set 4	Set 5	Total	Report
Aug 22	12:00	CPA	UNO-R Lady Rams	3–2	USA Golden Eagles							

=== Championship ===
Date	Time	Venue		Score		Set 1	Set 2	Set 3	Set 4	Set 5	Total	Report
Aug 22	16:00	CPA	USLS Lady Stingers	1–3	CPU Golden Lions							

2026 V-League Visayas Women's Champions

1st title

== Final standings ==
Rank	Men's	Women's
1st place, gold medalist(s)	CPU Golden Lions	CPU Golden Lions
2nd place, silver medalist(s)	USA Golden Eagles	USLS Lady Stingers
3rd place, bronze medalist(s)	UNO-R Rams	UNO-R Rams
4	USLS Stingers	USA Golden Eagles
5	ACC Archangels	
6	PCC Sweet Spikers	
