= Discovery Women's Basketball Invitational =

Sports tournament in the Philippines

- Sport: Basketball
- Founded: 2011
- Folded: 2015
- Country: Philippines
- Last champion: Philippines (3rd title)
- Most titles: Philippines (3 titles)

The Discovery Women's Basketball Invitational is an international basketball tournament in the Philippines.

== History ==
In 2011, the inaugural invitational was contested by the women's national teams of the Philippines and Qatar along with Bangkok Bank of Thailand and a selection team from Fujian of China. The tournament hosted by Bacolod took place at the West Negros University Gym from September 28-October 1.

In 2013, the Discovery Invitational was known as "Jesse Robredo Memorial Cup" to commemorate the first death anniversary of former Department of the Interior and Local Government secretary Jesse Robredo, was an invitational basketball team which was contested by the women's national teams of the Philippines and Singapore, along with a Gold Coast All Stars team assembled by Gold Coast Basketball of Australia. India was also invited to partake at the tournament but did not send its team due to a ban imposed on its National Olympic Committee by the International Olympic Committee at that time which took effect in December 2012. The tournament was held in Naga City from August 22–25, 2013 at the Jesse Robredo Coliseum.

In 2015, the invitational was held once again and was contested by the women's national teams of the Philippines, Turkmenistan, and Team A and B of Papua New Guinea. The games took place in Davao City at the Almendras Gym Davao City Recreation Center.

== Results ==
Year	Host	Final			Third place game		
Year	Host	Champion	Score	Second place	Third place	Score	Fourth place
2011; Details	Bacolod	Philippines	65–54	(Thailand); Bangkok Bank	(China); Fujian	105-40	Qatar
2013; Details	Naga	Philippines	No playoffs	Singapore	(Australia); Gold Coast	No playoffs	
2015; Details	Davao City	Philippines	78–58	Papua New Guinea A	Turkmenistan	72-34	Papua New Guinea B
2017; Details	Taguig	Shoot It Dragon Thailand	W–L	Discovery Perlas	Nepal Ho Chi Minh Vietnam B	Co-third place	

== Medal tally ==
=== By country ===
Country	Gold	Silver	Bronze	Total
Philippines	3	1	0	4
Thailand	0	2	0	2
Papua New Guinea	0	1	0	1
Singapore	0	1	0	1
Australia	0	0	1	1
China	0	0	1	1
Nepal	0	0	1	1
Turkmenistan	0	0	1	1
Vietnam	0	0	1	1

=== By club/team ===
Club/Team	Gold	Silver	Bronze	Total
Philippines	3	0	0	3
(Thailand) Bangkok Bank	0	1	0	1
Papua New Guinea A	0	1	0	1
Singapore	0	1	0	1
(China) Fujian	0	0	1	1
(Australia) Gold Coast	0	0	1	1
Turkmenistan	0	0	1	1

== Participation details ==
Team	BAC 2011	NAG 2013	DAV 2015
(Thailand) Bangkok Bank	2nd	-	-
(China) Fujian	3rd	-	-
(Australia) Gold Coast	-	3rd	-
Papua New Guinea A	-	-	2nd
Papua New Guinea B	-	-	4th
Philippines	1st	1st	1st
Qatar	4th	-	-
Singapore	-	2nd	-
Turkmenistan	-	-	3rd
