= University of Southern Philippines =

University of Southern Philippines may refer to two distinct educational institutions in the Philippines:

- University of Southern Philippines Foundation (USPF), in Cebu City, formerly known as University of Southern Philippines
- University of Southeastern Philippines (USeP), in Davao City, formerly known as University of Southern Philippines
