= Sports Vision =

Sports organization in the Philippines

- Sports Vision Management Group, Inc.
- Formation: 2004; 22 years ago
- Founders: Ricky Palou; Jun Bernardino; Moying Martelino; Rhea Navarro
- Type: Sports organization

Sports Vision Management Group, Inc., also known simply as Sports Vision, is a sports organization in the Philippines which mainly specializes in volleyball. The organization currently operates the women's Premier Volleyball League, the men's Spikers' Turf, and the collegiate V-League and its Visayas counterpart. It has also helped organize events held in the country such as the 2025 AVC Women's Volleyball Champions League.

== History ==
Sports Vision was originally composed of four entrepreneurs with prior experience in basketball: former Ateneo Blue Eagle and Manila Industrial and Commercial Athletic Association (MICAA) player Ricky Palou, former Philippine Basketball Association commissioner Jun Bernardino, former Asian Basketball Confederation secretary-general Moying Martelino, and Qatar Basketball Federation supervisor Rhea Navarro. In an interview with Lito Cinco of BusinessMirror, Palou said that he “saw the beauty of women’s volleyball” and later suggested Sports Vision to create a volleyball league though he wasn't sure if the league would become successful. This led to the creation of the Shakey's V-League in 2004 as part of a partnership with title sponsor Shakey's Pizza.

In 2015, Sports Vision launched a men's counterpart to the SVL, Spikers' Turf. Martelino stated that men's volleyball didn't have that same popularity as women's volleyball and that the organization "has a feeling if we do the same with the men’s; it will be as popular.”

In 2017, the Shakey's V-League rebranded as the Premier Volleyball League. The PVL featured both women's and men's divisions, with the latter being merged from Spikers' Turf. One year later in 2018, Spikers' Turf was reinstated as its own separate league and entity. While the COVID-19 pandemic temporarily put a stop on league play, the PVL was on the process of turning into a professional league. The 2021 PVL season marked the league's first professional season. During this time, Spikers' Turf also began the process of turning pro.

The PVL's professionalization, however, meant that collegiate teams can no longer participate. Thus in 2022, the V-League was established as its own entity, while also serving as a revival of the SVL. The new V-League is essentially a merger of both the PVL's and Spikers' Turf's Collegiate Conferences, now under a single league. In 2025, a regional counterpart for Visayas-based teams was launched with V-League Visayas.

In 2025, Sports Vision helped organize the 2025 AVC Women's Volleyball Champions League, hosted by the Philippines in Pasig.

== Leagues and events organized ==
- Shakey's V-League (2004–2016)
- Spikers' Turf (2015–present)
- Premier Volleyball League (2017–present)
- V-League (2022–present)
  - V-League Visayas (2025–present)
- 2025 AVC Women's Volleyball Champions League
