= 2011 Discovery Women's Basketball Invitational =

Tournament details
- Host country: Philippines
- Dates: September 28-October 1
- Teams: 4
- Venue: 1 (in 1 host city)

Final positions
- Champions: Philippines (1st title)

The 2011 Discovery Women’s Basketball Invitational was an invitational basketball tournament which was contested by the women's national teams of the Philippines and Qatar along with Bangkok Bank of Thailand and a selection team from Fujian of China. The tournament hosted by Bacolod took place at the West Negros University Gym from September 28-October 1.

== Results ==
=== Preliminary round ===
Team	Pld	W	L	PF	PA	PD	Pts
Philippines	3	3	0	192	136	+56	6
(Thailand) Bangkok Bank	3	2	1	227	193	+34	5
(China) Fujian	3	1	2	197	202	-5	4
Qatar	3	0	3	153	210	-57	3

September 28
15:00

Report

Fujian (China)	71–88	(Thailand) Bangkok Bank
		Pts: Pattrawadee 21

West Negros University Gym, Bacolod

September 28
17:30

Report

Philippines	69–40	Qatar
Pts: Limgenco, Almazan 9

West Negros University Gym, Bacolod

September 29
15:00

Report

Fujian (China)	79–51	Qatar
Pts: Chen 20

West Negros University Gym, Bacolod

September 29
17:00

Report

Philippines	60–49	(Thailand) Bangkok Bank
Pts: Almazan 7

West Negros University Gym, Bacolod

September 30
15:00

Report

Qatar	62–90	(Thailand) Bangkok Bank
Pts: Chen 20

West Negros University Gym, Bacolod

September 30
17:00

Report

Philippines	63–47	(China) Fujian
Scoring by quarter: 21–11, 12–15, 21–11, 9–10
Pts: Adriano 19		Pts: Q. Lin 17

West Negros University Gym, Bacolod

=== Third place match ===
October 1

Report

Fujian (China)	105–40	Qatar
Pts: Chen 20

West Negros University Gym, Bacolod

=== Final ===
October 1

Report

Philippines	65–54	(Thailand) Bangkok Bank
Scoring by quarter: 16–8, 16–16, 16–9, 23–21
Pts: Jacob 16		Pts: Nisaimun 13

West Negros University Gym, Bacolod

== Awards ==
2011 Discovery Women’s Basketball Invitational Champions

Philippines
First title
