= 2013 Discovery Women's Basketball Invitational =

Tournament details
- Host country: Philippines
- Dates: August 22–25
- Teams: 3
- Venue: 1 (in 1 host city)

Final positions
- Champions: Philippines (2nd title)

The 2013 Discovery Women’s Basketball Invitational, also known as Jesse Robredo Memorial Cup to commemorate the first death anniversary of former Department of the Interior and Local Government secretary Jesse Robredo, was an invitational basketball tournament which was contested by the women's national teams of the Philippines and Singapore, along with a Gold Coast All Stars team assembled by Gold Coast Basketball of Australia. India was also invited to take part in the tournament but did not send its team due to a ban imposed on its National Olympic Committee by the International Olympic Committee at that time which took effect in December 2012. The tournament was held in Naga City from August 22–25, 2013 at the Jesse Robredo Coliseum.

== Results ==
The tournament was initially planned to be a single round robin with the top two team playing for the championships at the finals. The tournament's format was switched into a double round robin format with each team at the tournament facing the other teams twice.

August 22
16:00

Report

| Philippines | 74–52 | Singapore |

Jesse Robredo Coliseum, Naga City

August 23

Report

| Philippines | 56–47 | (Australia) Gold Coast |

Jesse Robredo Coliseum, Naga City

August 24

Report

| Philippines | 90–21 | Singapore |

Jesse Robredo Coliseum, Naga City

August 24

Report

| Singapore | 52–67 | (Australia) Gold Coast |

Jesse Robredo Coliseum, Naga City

August 23

Report

| Philippines | 77–69 | (Australia) Gold Coast |
| Pts: Borja 15 |

Jesse Robredo Coliseum, Naga City

It is unknown what the scoreline is between the one other match between Singapore and Gold Coast. The Philippines emerged champions with Gold Coast placing second and Singapore placing last.

== Awards ==
2013 Discovery Women’s Basketball Invitational Champions

Philippines
Second title
