= Mauricio Martelino =

Filipino sports executive (1935–2021)

Secretary General of the Asian Basketball Confederation
- In office 1991–1998

Personal details
- Born: March 21, 1935
- Died: September 22, 2021 (aged 86)
- Occupation: Sports executive and administrator

Mauricio "Moying" Martelino (March 21, 1935 – September 22, 2021) was a Filipino sports executive who was involved in bowling, basketball, and volleyball. He was secretary general of the Asian Basketball Confederation from 1991 to 1998.

== Background ==
Mauricio Martelino was part of the Philippine Bowling Congress in the 1970s as its secretary general. He played bowling himself and was a regular at the old Bowling Inn in Taft Avenue, which was near his residence in Malate. His brother-in-law Gonzalo Puyat II convinced him to move to the Basketball Association of the Philippines (BAP), where Martelino also served as its secretary general. Martelino also oversaw the 1978 FIBA World Championship as its executive director. He was also a commissioner of the Philippine Amateur Basketball League in its early years.

Martelino then also got involved in the Gintong Alay project headed by Michael Marcos Keon before returning as BAP secretary general. The Qatar National Olympic Committee acquired Martelino's services. Martelino served as secretary general of the Asian Basketball Confederation from 1991 to 1998. In 1999, he was conferred the FIBA Order of Merit.

Martelino served as chairman of the Sports Vision Management Group, which organizes the Premier Volleyball League. He also helped established Sports Vision in 2004.

The Samahang Basketbol ng Pilipinas (SBP) tapped Martelino as its senior consultant in 2011 to 2020. He was awarded a plaque of appreciation by the SBP for his previous role with the federation.

In 2014, the Philippine Sportswriters Association conferred him a Lifetime Achievement Award during its 2014 PSA Annual Awards.

== Death ==
Martelino died on September 22, 2021, due to a lingering illness.
