= 2025 V-League Visayas season =

Inaugural season of V-League Visayas

- League: V-League Visayas
- Sport: Volleyball
- Duration: July 6–27, 2025
- Matches: M: 16; W: 16
- Teams: M: 6 W: 6
- Season MVP: M June Yungco (USC); W Rachel Tecson (USJ-R)
- Men's champions: UC Webmasters
- Men's runners-up: USPF Panthers
- Women's champions: USJ–R Lady Jaguars
- Women's runners-up: USC Lady Warriors
- Finals MVP: M Quiades Labos (UC); W Lyn Densing (USJ-R)

V-League Visayas seasons
- 2026 →

The 2025 V-League Visayas season was the inaugural season of V-League Visayas. The season runs from July 6 to July 27, 2025 and features six teams, all based in Cebu City and affiliated with CESAFI.

The UC Webmasters and the USJ-R Lady Jaguars made history as the first ever champions of the V-League Visayas on Sunday, July 27, at the USJ-R Basak Campus Coliseum. UC Webmasters overcame a thrilling four-set battle against the USPF Panthers to reign supreme in the men's division. On the other hand, USJ-R Lady Jaguars swept the USC Lady Warriors in straight sets, (3-0) to grab the women's crown.

== Participating teams ==
These are the teams who will compete for the inaugural season of V-League Visayas.

2025 V-League Visayas teams
Team	School	Collegiate League
Men's division
CIT-U Wildcats	Cebu Institute of Technology – University	CESAFI
UC Webmasters	University of Cebu	CESAFI
USC Warriors	University of San Carlos	CESAFI
USJ–R Jaguars	University of San Jose–Recoletos	CESAFI
USPF Panthers	University of Southern Philippines Foundation	CESAFI
UP Cebu Fighting Maroons	University of the Philippines Cebu	CESAFI
Women's division
CIT-U Lady Wildcats	Cebu Institute of Technology – University	CESAFI
UC Lady Webmasters	University of Cebu	CESAFI
USC Lady Warriors	University of San Carlos	CESAFI
USJ–R Lady Jaguars	University of San Jose–Recoletos	CESAFI
USPF Lady Panthers	University of Southern Philippines Foundation	CESAFI
UP Cebu Fighting Maroons	University of the Philippines Cebu	CESAFI

== Arenas ==
Preliminaries and Championship	Preliminaries	
Cebu City
University of San Jose–Recoletos (Basak Coliseum)	University of San Carlos (Anselmo Bustos Sports Complex)	University of Southern Philippines Foundation
Capacity: 4,000	Capacity: 4,000	Capacity: 2,500

== Format ==
The following format will be used for both men's and women's divisions:

- The preliminary round is a single round-robin tournament, with each team playing one match against all other teams for a total of five matches. Teams are ranked using the FIVB Ranking System.
- The top two teams will advance to the championship match.
- The championship match will be a singular match.

== Pool standing procedure ==
- First, teams are ranked by the number of matches won.
- If the number of matches won is tied, the tied teams are then ranked by match points, wherein:
  - Match won 3–0 or 3–1: 3 match points for the winner, 0 match points for the loser.
  - Match won 3–2: 2 match points for the winner, 1 match point for the loser.
- In case of any further ties, the following criteria shall be used:
  - Set ratio: the number of sets won divided by number of sets lost.
  - Point ratio: the number of points scored divided by the number of points allowed.
  - Head-to-head standings: any remaining tied teams are ranked based on the results of head-to-head matches involving the teams in question.

== Men's tournament ==
- All times are Philippine Standard Time (UTC+8:00).

=== Preliminary round ===
Pos	Team	Pld	W	L	Pts	SW	SL	SR	SPW	SPL	SPR	Qualification
1	UC Webmasters	5	4	1	12	14	6	2.333	463	420	1.102	Championship
2	USPF Panthers	5	4	1	11	13	5	2.600	418	385	1.086	Championship
3	USC Warriors	5	3	2	9	10	7	1.429	389	379	1.026	
4	CIT-U Wildcats	5	3	2	9	11	10	1.100	465	435	1.069	
5	USJ–R Jaguars	5	1	4	4	5	12	0.417	367	397	0.924	
6	UPC Fighting Maroons	5	0	5	0	2	15	0.133	311	417	0.746	

Updated to match(es) played on July 26, 2025. Source: V-League

==== Match results ====
Date	Time	Venue		Score		Set 1	Set 2	Set 3	Set 4	Set 5	Total	Report
Jul 06	15:00	USJ–R	CIT-U Wildcats	0–3	USPF Panthers	17–25	23–25	22–25			62–75	P2
Jul 06	17:00	USJ–R	USJ–R Jaguars	3–0	UPC Fighting Maroons	25–23	25–22	25–13			75–58	P2
Jul 12	09:00	USPF	CIT-U Wildcats	3–1	UPC Fighting Maroons	22–25	25–15	25–18	25–14		97–72	P2
Jul 12	11:00	USPF	USJ–R Jaguars	0–3	USPF Panthers	16–25	19–25	22–25			57–75	P2
Jul 12	13:00	USPF	UC Webmasters	3–0	USC Warriors	25–18	25–20	26–24			76–62	P2
Jul 13	09:00	USPF	USJ–R Jaguars	2–3	CIT-U Wildcats	25–20	18–25	25–14	18–25	12–15	98–99	P2
Jul 13	11:00	USPF	USC Warriors	3–0	UPC Fighting Maroons	25–19	25–19	25–19			75–57	P2
Jul 13	13:00	USPF	UC Webmasters	2–3	USPF Panthers	26–24	25–14	18–25	16–25	7–15	92–103	P2
Jul 19	15:00	USC	UPC Fighting Maroons	0–3	USPF Panthers	19–25	18–25	20–25			57–75	P2
Jul 19	17:00	USC	UC Webmasters	3–0	USJ–R Jaguars	25–22	35–33	26–24			86–79	P2
Jul 19	19:00	USC	USC Warriors	1–3	CIT-U Wildcats	25–23	20–25	11–25	20–25		76–98	P2
Jul 20	15:00	USC	UC Webmasters	3–2	CIT-U Wildcats	23–25	25–20	24–26	27–25	15–13	114–109	P2
Jul 20	17:00	USC	USC Warriors	3–1	USPF Panthers	26–24	21–25	25–19	25–22		97–90	P2
Jul 26	09:00	USJ–R	UC Webmasters	3–1	UPC Fighting Maroons	25–16	20–25	25–16	25–10		95–67	P2
Jul 26	11:00	USJ–R	USC Warriors	3–0	USJ–R Jaguars	25–16	25–15	29–27			79–58	P2

=== Championship ===
Date	Time	Venue		Score		Set 1	Set 2	Set 3	Set 4	Set 5	Total	Report
Jul 27	11:00	USJ–R	UC Webmasters	3–1	USPF Panthers	26–24	18–25	25–23	25–23		94–95	P2

2025 V-League Visayas Men's Champions
UC Webmasters
1st title

== Women's tournament ==
- All times are Philippine Standard Time (UTC+8:00).

=== Preliminary round ===
Pos	Team	Pld	W	L	Pts	SW	SL	SR	SPW	SPL	SPR	Qualification
1	USC Lady Warriors	5	5	0	15	15	2	7.500	419	287	1.460	Championship
2	USJ–R Lady Jaguars	5	4	1	12	13	3	4.333	387	311	1.244	Championship
3	UC Lady Webmasters	5	2	3	6	8	10	0.800	394	423	0.931	
4	CIT-U Lady Wildcats	5	2	3	6	7	10	0.700	344	390	0.882	
5	USPF Lady Panthers	5	1	4	4	6	13	0.462	379	436	0.869	
6	UP Cebu Fighting Maroons	5	1	4	2	3	14	0.214	335	408	0.821	

Updated to match(es) played on July 27, 2025. Source: V-League

==== Match results ====
Date	Time	Venue		Score		Set 1	Set 2	Set 3	Set 4	Set 5	Total	Report
Jul 06	09:00	USJ–R	CIT-U Lady Wildcats	1–3	USPF Lady Panthers	21–25	25–21	14–25	22–25		82–96	P2
Jul 06	11:00	USJ–R	USJ–R Lady Jaguars	3–0	UPC Fighting Maroons	25–21	25–11	25–20			75–52	P2
Jul 12	15:00	USPF	CIT-U Lady Wildcats	3–0	UPC Fighting Maroons	25–21	25–20	25–23			75–64	P2
Jul 12	17:00	USPF	USJ–R Lady Jaguars	3–0	USPF Lady Panthers	25–15	25–15	25–20			75–50	P2
Jul 12	19:00	USPF	UC Lady Webmasters	1–3	USC Lady Warriors	10–25	16–25	25–21	17–25		68–96	P2
Jul 13	15:00	USPF	USJ–R Lady Jaguars	3–0	CIT-U Lady Wildcats	25–19	25–15	25–14			75–48	P2
Jul 13	17:00	USPF	USC Lady Warriors	3–0	UPC Fighting Maroons	25–17	25–12	25–18			75–47	P2
Jul 13	19:00	USPF	UC Lady Webmasters	3–1	USPF Lady Panthers	25–16	25–21	24–26	25–23		99–86	P2
Jul 19	09:00	USC	UPC Fighting Maroons	3–2	USPF Lady Panthers	25–20	23–25	25–20	17–25	15–12	105–102	P2
Jul 19	11:00	USC	UC Lady Webmasters	0–3	USJ–R Lady Jaguars	24–26	18–25	21–25			63–76	P2
Jul 19	13:00	USC	USC Lady Warriors	3–0	CIT-U Lady Wildcats	25–12	25–9	25–20			75–41	P2
Jul 20	11:00	USC	UC Lady Webmasters	1–3	CIT-U Lady Wildcats	25–23	23–25	21–25	14–25		83–98	P2
Jul 20	13:00	USC	USC Lady Warriors	3–0	USPF Lady Panthers	25–9	25–14	25–22			75–45	P2
Jul 26	07:00	USJ–R	USC Lady Warriors	3–1	USJ–R Lady Jaguars	25–18	20–25	25–17	28–26		98–86	P2
Jul 27	07:00	USJ–R	UC Lady Webmasters	3–0	UPC Fighting Maroons	25–21	25–17	31–29			81–67	P2

=== Championship ===
Date	Time	Venue		Score		Set 1	Set 2	Set 3	Set 4	Set 5	Total	Report
Jul 27	09:00	USJ–R	USC Lady Warriors	0–3	USJ–R Lady Jaguars	22–25	23–25	15–25			60–75	P2

2025 V-League Visayas Women's Champions
USJ–R Lady Jaguars
1st title

== Awards and medalists ==
=== Individual awards ===
Award	Men's	Women's	Ref.
Conference Most Valuable Player	June Yungco (USC)	Rachel Tecson (USJ-R)	
Finals Most Valuable Player	Quiades Labos (UC)	Lyn Densing (USJ-R)	
Best Setter	Charles Emboy (USPF)	Jolly Velasquez (USC)	
1st Best Outside Spiker	Spencer Carcueva (USPF)	Leady Rule (UC)	
2nd Best Outside Spiker	Mauikyle Monceda (UC)	Rachel Tecson (USJ-R)	
1st Best Middle Blocker	Ryan Pantilgan (UC)	Glaiza Santusidad (UC)	
2nd Best Middle Blocker	Shem Rosal (CIT-U)	Angel Galinato (USC)	
Best Opposite Spiker	Sherwien Bawang (CIT-U)	Rose Bisnar (USC)	
Best Libero	Webb Paneiro (USPF)	Jeylenne Arregadas (CIT-U)	
Nestlé coolest of all time	John Marc Solon (USC)	Esha Nasayao (USC)	

=== Medalists ===
Division	Gold	Silver	Bronze
Men's	UC Webmasters: Jose Illustrismo (c); Rico Academia Jr.; Dyle Aying; Kianne Bernadez; Jobby Bisnar; Christian Carampatana; Jhevy Ecot; Acadio Guerrero; Quiades Labos; Andrei Lapay; James Laugo; Nino Mahilum; Mauikyle Monceda; Velch Pacible; Ronel Palacio; Ryan Pantilgan; Jed Pelayo; Shan Robles; John Veliganio Head Coach: John Abas	USPF Panthers: Charles Emboy (c); Frenz Barot; Aljanle Calamba; Mark Canturias; Spencer Carcueva; Christian Casas; Vhon Ceballos; Edsel De Castilla; Dale Doming; Jasper Judilla; Rese Lawian; Kyle Lehitimas; James Manalili; Rene Mopon; Webb Panerio; Jimreal Sabellina; Jesie Seguisabal; John Valerio; Ben Villabito; Manny Visayas Head Coach: Cecil Jotojot	USC Warriors: John Tubil (c); Paul Barro; Van Batayola; Ray Cubero; Adonis Dellosa; Dave Dotollo; Ivan Dugenio; Vince Laresma; Marcus Mina; Orly Patalinghug; Jan Solon; Gio Valdez; Leigh Villaruel; June Yungco Head Coach: Grace Antigua
Women's	USJ-R Lady Jaguars: Lyn Densing (c); Ann Bacalso; RJ Mae Balucan; Althea Cabanlit; Mary Cortes; Dianne Duazo; Alyssa Emboy; Raichiel Ferrer; Julienne Gadingan; Kamea Lepiten; Renalyn Mamac; Bianca Ordona; Glydel Pantallano; Mae Patinga; Christle Tamayo; Rachel Tecson; Avriel Yortas Head Coach: Roldan Potot	USC Lady Warriors: Zoe Cuizon (c); Kissa Abrantes; Gilda Alo; Jerusha Atay; Rose Bisnar; Cindee Carumba; Alyssah Diez; Angel Galinato; Esha Nasayao; Czera Pintor; Wildifie Sasing; Allissa Seledio; Ghanna Suan; Mary Tariman; Jolly Velasquez; Izzy Villaganas; Jullian Yu Head Coach: Grace Antigua	UC Lady Webmasters: Leady Rule (c); Shaira Dejito; Mary Duran; Marianne Mahinay; Jasmine Maluya; Keisha Mortales; Louela Pagobo; Rhea Parejo; Cynthia Ponce; Glaiza Santusidad; Michelle Serinas; Sharmyl Sestoso; Myka Tampos; Cristene Ventic Head Coach: Elvin Tabura

== Final standings ==
Rank	Men's	Women's
1st place, gold medalist(s)	UC Webmasters	USJ–R Lady Jaguars
2nd place, silver medalist(s)	USPF Panthers	USC Lady Warriors
3rd place, bronze medalist(s)	USC Warriors	UC Lady Webmasters
4	CIT-U Wildcats	CIT-U Lady Wildcats
5	USJ–R Jaguars	USPF Lady Panthers
6	UP Cebu Fighting Maroons	UP Cebu Fighting Maroons
