= Turkmenistan men's national basketball team =

Turkmenistan
- FIBA ranking: NR (1 September 2026)
- Joined FIBA: 1998
- FIBA zone: FIBA Asia
- National federation: Basketball Federation of Turkmenistan
- Coach: Ridvan Velishayev

Olympic Games
- Appearances: None

FIBA World Cup
- Appearances: None

Asian Championship
- Appearances: None
Home	Away

The Turkmenistan national basketball team represents Turkmenistan in international competitions. It is administered by the Basketball Federation of Turkmenistan. (Turkmen: Türkmenistanyň basketbol federasiýasy)

Turkmenistan had its last noteworthy appearance at the 2010 Asian Games where, after a long battle, it ceded to Mongolia 85–90. The country won the silver medal at the 3-on-3 basketball at the 2012 Asian Beach Games competition.

== Competitions ==
=== Performance at Summer Olympics ===
Yet to qualify

=== Performance at World championships ===
Yet to qualify

=== FIBA Asia Cup ===
Year	Position	Pld	W	L
1960 to 1991	Part of Soviet Union			
(Indonesia) 1993	Not a FIBA member			
(South Korea) 1995	Not a FIBA member			
(Saudi Arabia) 1997	Not a FIBA member			
(Japan) 1999	Did not enter			
(China) 2001	Did not enter			
(China) 2003	Did not enter			
(Qatar) 2005	Did not enter			
(Japan) 2007	Did not enter			
(China) 2009	Did not enter			
(China) 2011	Did not qualify			
(Philippines) 2013	Did not enter			
(China) 2015	Did not enter			
(Lebanon) 2017	Did not enter			
(Indonesia) 2022	Did not enter			
(Saudi Arabia) 2025	Did not enter			
2029	Did not enter			
Total	0/32	0	0	0
