= Turkmenistan Basketball Federation =

- Türkmenistanyň basketbol federasiýasy
- Formation: 1998; 28 years ago
- Type: National Sport Association
- Headquarters: Oguzhan street 7, Ashgabat, Turkmenistan
- President: Aýdogdy Berdiýew
- Affiliations: FIBA, FIBA Asia, National Olympic Committee of Turkmenistan
- Website: tkm.basketball

The Turkmenistan Basketball Federation ('TBF; Turkmen: Türkmenistanyň basketbol federasiýasy) is the governing body of basketball in Turkmenistan. The TBF is a member of FIBA and FIBA Asia. The association founded in 1998, represents basketball with public authorities as well as with national and international sports organizations and as such with Turkmenistan in international competitions. It also defends the moral and material interests of basketball in Turkmenistan.

The federation is responsible for the Turkmenistan men's national basketball team and the Turkmenistan women's national basketball team and their Under-age teams.
