= 2015 Discovery Women's Basketball Invitational =

Basketball tournament

Tournament details
- Host country: Philippines
- Dates: February 19–22
- Teams: 4
- Venue(s): 1 (in 1 host city)

Final positions
- Champions: Philippines (3rd title)

The 2015 Discovery Women’s Basketball Invitational was an invitational basketball tournament which was contested by the women's national teams of the Philippines, Turkmenistan, and Team A and B of Papua New Guinea. The games took place in Davao City at the Almendras Gym Davao City Recreation Center.

== Results ==
=== Preliminary round ===
Team	Pld	W	L	PF	PA	PD	Pts
Philippines	3	3	0	237	127	+56	6
Papua New Guinea A	3	2	1	196	202	-6	5
Turkmenistan	3	1	2	179	154	+25	4
Papua New Guinea B	3	0	3	109	238	-129	3

February 19

Report

Philippines	83–29	Papua New Guinea B
Pts: Siat 18		Pts: Sam 16

Almendras Gym, Davao City

February 19

Report

Papua New Guinea A	62–60	Turkmenistan
Pts: Angula 16		Pts: Gokova 23

Almendras Gym, Davao City

February 20

Report

Turkmenistan	78–25	Papua New Guinea B
Pts: Gokova 32		Pts: Angula 16

Almendras Gym, Davao City

February 20

Report

Papua New Guinea A	57–87	Philippines
Pts: Gloriani 26

Almendras Gym, Davao City

February 21

Report

Papua New Guinea A	77–55	Papua New Guinea B
Pts: Jarabako, Elavo 13

Almendras Gym, Davao City

February 21

Report

Philippines	67–41	Turkmenistan
Pts: Siat 22

Almendras Gym, Davao City

=== Third place play-off ===
February 22

Report

Turkmenistan	72–34	Papua New Guinea B

Almendras Gym, Davao City

=== Finals ===
February 22

Report

Philippines	78–58	Papua New Guinea A

Almendras Gym, Davao City

== Awards ==
The Philippines won their third title winning against Papua New Guinea A team in the finals. Turkmenistan placed third while Papua New Guinea B placed fourth.

2015 Discovery Women’s Basketball Invitational Champions

Philippines
Third title
