= Qatar Basketball Federation =

- Abbreviation: QBF
- Formation: 1964; 62 years ago
- Location: Doha, Qatar
- President: Mohammed Saad Almeghaiseeb
- Secretary General: Saadoun Alkuwari
- Affiliations: FIBA; FIBA Asia; Qatar Olympic Committee
- Website: http://www.qatarbasketball.qa/ar/

The Qatar Basketball Federation (Arabic: الاتحاد القطري لكرة السلة) is the governing body of basketball in Qatar.

The federation was founded in 1964 and joined FIBA in 1977 and FIBA Asia in 1979. It represents basketball with public authorities as well as with national and international sports organizations and as such with Qatar in international competitions. It also defends the moral and material interests of Basketball in Qatar. It is affiliated with FIBA and FIBA Asia.

The federation also organizes the Qatar national basketball team and the Qatar women's national basketball team.

== Leagues ==
- Qatari Basketball League
