= Turkmenistan women's national basketball team =

Turkmenistan
- FIBA ranking: NR (14 September 2026)
- FIBA zone: FIBA Asia
- National federation: Basketball Federation of Turkmenistan
- Coach: Irina Yakovleva

Olympic Games
- Appearances: None

World Cup
- Appearances: None

Asia Cup
- Appearances: None

The Turkmenistan women's national basketball team is the women's basketball side that represents Turkmenistan in international competitions.

== Competition records ==
=== Discovery Women’s Basketball Invitational ===
- Bronze: 1 (2015)
