= University of Negros Occidental – Recoletos =

Roman Catholic university in Bacolod, Philippines

University of Negros Occidental – Recoletos, Incorporated
- Pamantasan ng Negros Occidental – Rekoletos (Filipino)
- Seal of the University of Negros Occidental - Recoletos
- Former names: Occidental Negros Institute (1941–1957); University of Negros Occidental (1957–1962)
- Motto: Caritas et Scientia (Latin)
- Motto in English: Love and Knowledge
- Type: Private, Roman Catholic, Research, coeducational basic and higher education institution
- Established: 1941; 85 years ago
- Founders: Dr. Antonio A. Lizares; Dr. Francisco Kilayko
- Religious affiliation: Roman Catholic (Augustinian Recollects)
- Academic affiliations: PAASCU and PACUCOA
- President: Rev. Fr. Joel A. Alve, OAR
- Vice-president: List: Rev. Fr. Leonardo Pauligue, OAR (VP for Administration, Local Prior, & Property Administrator); Rev. Fr. Leo Alaras, OAR (VP for Academics and Research, Director of Basic Education, and NSTP Director); Rev. Fr. Ferdinand Fornilos, OAR (VP for Identity, Mission, Formation); Rev. Fr. Amadeo Lucero, OAR (VP for Finance)
- Director: List: Rev. Fr. Leander Barrot, OAR (Director, Campus Ministry Office and Religious Education); Rev. Fr. Joaquin Jamelo, OAR (Coordinator for Security)
- Administrative staff: Approximately 500
- Location: 51 Lizares Ave., Bacolod, Negros Occidental, Philippines; 10°39′22″N 122°56′52″E
- Campus: Urban, 15 hectares (150,000 m^{2})
- Alma Mater song: UNO-R Alma Mater Hymn; The Blue and the Gold March
- Patron saint: Saint Nicholas of Tolentino
- Colors: Blue and Gold
- Nickname: UNO-Rians
- Sporting affiliations: NOPSSCEA
- Mascot: Golden Ram
- Website: www.uno-r.edu.ph
- Location in the Visayas Location in the Philippines

The University of Negros Occidental – Recoletos, Incorporated (UNO-Recoletos, Filipino: Unibersidad ng Negros Occidental – Rekoletos, Incorporated, colloquially UNO-R), is a private, Catholic coeducational basic and higher education institution administered by the Order of Augustinian Recollects in Bacolod, Negros Occidental, Philippines. It was founded in 1941.

All six colleges and Integrated School departments (N-10 and Grades 11 and 12) of UNO-Recoletos are undergoing accreditation from the Philippines Accrediting Association of Schools, Colleges and Universities (PAASCU). The Recoletos de Bacolod Graduate School (RBGS) is undergoing accreditation from PACUCOA. Moreover, College of Information Technology is recognized by the Commission on Higher Education (CHED) the distinction as Center of Development and Excellence.

Additionally, CHED, through the Institutional Development and Innovation Grant (IDIG) proposals, funded an e-Learning initiative for agriculture education project in the institution. The project is called the Recoletos Online Learning Extension and is administered by the Agriculture Program under the College of Arts and Sciences.

== Philosophy, Vision, Mission, Goals, and Institutional Thrusts and Policy Framework ==
(Approved by the School Board on June 10, 2026; UNO-R inc BOT on July 21, 2026)

• Philosophy. An Augustinian Recollect Center of Learning which makes knowledge (SCIENTIA) a structure of wisdom that leads one to the exercise of love (CARITAS).

• Vision Statement. The University of Negros Occidental-Recoletos (UNO-R), Incorporated envisions itself as a globally recognized Augustinian Recollect University committed to inclusive education, through quality instruction, transformative research, and sustainable community development.

• Mission Statement. The University of Negros Occidental-Recoletos (UNO-R), Incorporated educates the mind and the heart through globally relevant Catholic education by providing learner-centered instruction, engaging in impactful research, and sustaining community initiatives to form competent, socially responsive, and values-driven graduates.

• Quality Objectives. Guided by the vision, mission, and commitment to excellence, the University of Negros Occidental-Recoletos, Incorporated commits to:

o Instruction. o Research and Innovation. o Community Engagement (Extension). o Production. o Planning and Sustainability. o Internationalization. o Facilities and Resources. o Sustainable Campus Practices. o Quality Assurance.

• Institutional Thrusts (7-Point Agenda)

o Christian Evangelization and Formation o Augustinian Pedagogy and Academic Excellence o Research and Innovation o Integral Human Development o Technology and Infrastructure Upgrade o Accreditation, Certification, and Quality Assurance o Sustainable Local and International Partnerships and Alumni Engagement

• Educational Organization Management System (EOMS) Quality Policy. UNO-R commits to delivering excellence in education through instruction, research, and extension by ensuring compliance with applicable statutory, regulatory, legal, and established standards while upholding continual improvement to address the needs and expectations of relevant interested parties through measurable quality objectives, innovation, and responsiveness to educational, scientific, and technological developments toward social responsibility, stakeholder satisfaction, and the sustainability and effectiveness of all operations.

• UNO-R Graduate Attributes. The UNO-R Graduate Attributes (GA) are centered on forming God-centered individuals who are globally competent, intellectually empowered, servant leaders, and builders of communion with the integration of faith, reason, culture, and service to the Church and the society.

o God-centered Individual. o Intellectually Empowered. o Globally Competent. o Servant Leader. o Communion Builder.

== History ==
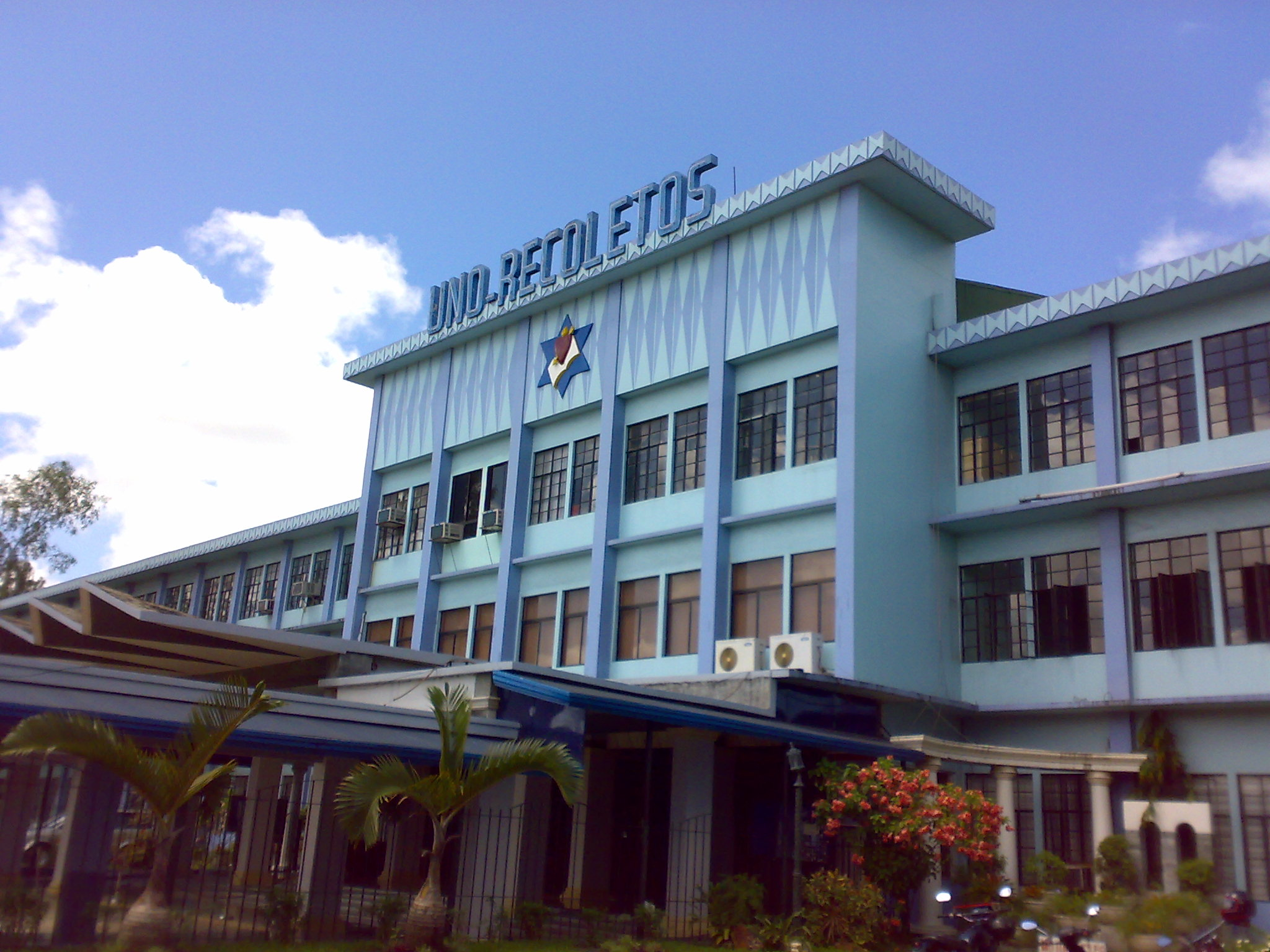
Facade of UNO-Recoletos

The University of Negros Occidental – Recoletos was founded in 1941 in Talisay, Negros Occidental by Dr. Antonio A. Lizares and Dr. Francisco Kilayko. Then known as Occidental Negros Institute, the school offered first and second years of high school education. Upon the outbreak of World War II in the Philippines in December of that same year, the institute closed temporarily.

Occidental Negros Institute was re-established in Bacolod in 1946, this time offering elementary, high school and three tertiary degree programs. The campus transferred from Locsin street (formerly Smith Street) to Lupit Subdivision in Lizares Avenue, its present site, in 1950. Dr. Antonio Lizares served as the school's first President with Dr. Francisco Kilayko as the School Director.

On May 15, 1957, ONI was elevated to university status by the Acting Secretary of Education, Martin V. Aguilar, Jr. ONI became the University of Negros Occidental, the first university in the province. Five years later, on May 25, 1962, UNO was acquired by the Augustinian Recollect friars. UNO became the University of Negros Occidental-Recoletos with Fr. Federico Terradillos, OAR, as the first acting Rector.

As of August 31, 2022, Reverend Fr. Joel A. Alve, OAR was elected as the University's 18th president. In 2025, Fr. Alve was re-elected President by the UNO-R, Inc. Board of Trustees for the quadrennium 2025-2030.

September 16, 2024 -The Commission on Higher Education named UNO-R as one of the Autonomous Universities in the Negros Island Region.

September 11, 2026 - The University becomes ISO 21001:2018 certified by TUV SUD.

2026 -2027 - The university celebrates its 85th Founding Anniversary in Talisay with the theme: A Legacy of Evangelization and Excellence, and its 80th anniversary in Bacolod City. Academic year 2027-2028 - The university will celebrate its 70th year as the 1st University in the Province of Negros Occidental and its 65th year as a Recoletos university, the 1st Catholic university on the Island of Negros.

== Academics ==
UNO-R offers Pre-School, Grade School, Junior High School, and Senior High School through its Integrated School, as well as diploma programs, undergraduate and graduate level programs. As of 2023, it has seven academic colleges, namely:

- College of Arts and Sciences
  - Bachelor of Arts in Communication
  - Bachelor of Science in Agriculture
  - Bachelor of Science in Psychology
  - Bachelor of Science in Social Work
- College of Business and Accountancy
  - Bachelor of Science in Accountancy
  - Bachelor of Science in Business Administration, Major in:
    - Financial Management
    - Marketing Management
  - Bachelor of Science in Hospitality Management
  - Bachelor of Science in Tourism Management
  - Bachelor of Science in Management Accounting
  - Bachelor of Science in Real Estate Management
- College of Engineering
  - Bachelor of Science in Chemical Engineering
  - Bachelor of Science in Civil Engineering
  - Bachelor of Science in Computer Engineering
  - Bachelor of Science in Electrical Engineering
  - Bachelor of Science in Electronics Engineering
  - Bachelor of Science in Mechanical Engineering
- College of Criminal Justice Education
  - Bachelor of Science in Criminology
- College of Education
  - Bachelor of Elementary Education
  - Bachelor of Physical Education
  - Bachelor of Secondary Education, Major in:
    - English
    - Filipino
    - Mathematics
    - Science
    - Social Studies
  - Bachelor of Special Needs Education with Specialization in Elementary School Teaching
- College of Allied Medical Health Sciences
  - Bachelor of Science in Medical Technology/Medical Laboratory Science
  - Bachelor of Science in Nursing
  - Bachelor of Science in Pharmacy
- College of Information Technology
  - Bachelor of Science in Computer Science
  - Bachelor of Science in Entertainment and Multimedia Computing
  - Bachelor of Science in Information System
  - Bachelor of Science in Information Technology

UNO-R also has a School of Law and a graduate school named the Recoletos de Bacolod Graduate School. UNO-R also offers TESDA-accredited courses under the Recoletos Industrial and Technology Training Center (RITTC).

== Patron saint ==
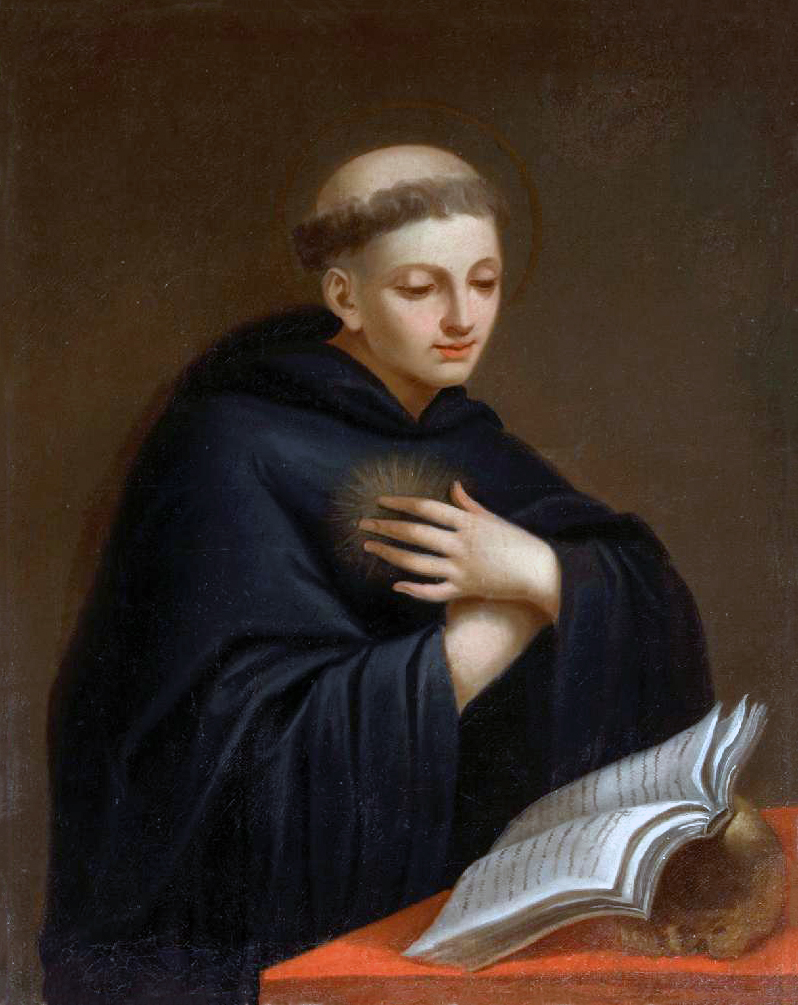
Nicholas of Tolentino

The University's patron saint is Nicholas of Tolentino. Saint Nicholas of Tolentino, known as the Patron of Holy Souls, was born at Sant' Angelo, near Fermo, in Italy in the March of Ancona, around 1246. His parents, Compagnonus de Guarutti and Amata de Guidiani, were originally unable to have a child, but after praying at a shrine of St. Nicholas of Myra, Amata became pregnant, and they named their son after the saint.

The University's official student publication, the Tolentine Star, established in 1947, pays homage to the saint.

== OAR schools in the Philippines ==
- University of San Jose–Recoletos (Cebu City) (Basak Campus) (Balamban Campus)
- San Sebastian College–Recoletos (Manila)
  - San Sebastian College–Recoletos de Manila, Canlubang satellite campus (Calamba, Laguna)
- San Sebastian College–Recoletos de Cavite
- Colegio de Santo Tomas – Recoletos (San Carlos City, Negros Occidental)
- Colegio San Nicolas de Tolentino–Recoletos (formerly UNO-R High School Talisay Branch) (Talisay City, Negros Occidental)
- Colegio de San Pedro Academy–Recoletos (Poblacion, Valencia, Negros Oriental)
- San Pedro Academy–Recoletos (Caidiocan, Valencia, Negros Oriental)

=== Seminary and Formation Houses ===
- Santo Tomas de Villanueva Recoletos Formation House (High School) (San Carlos City, Negros Occidental)
- Casiciaco Recoletos Seminary (formerly Seminario Mayor - Recoletos de Baguio) (Philosophy) (Baguio)
- Recoletos Formation Center (Theology) (Mira-Nila Homes, Quezon City)

== See also ==
- Augustinians
- Augustinian Recollects
- Bridgittines
- List of tertiary schools in Bacolod City
- Order of the Canons Regular of Premontre
- Society of Saint Augustine

== Gallery ==
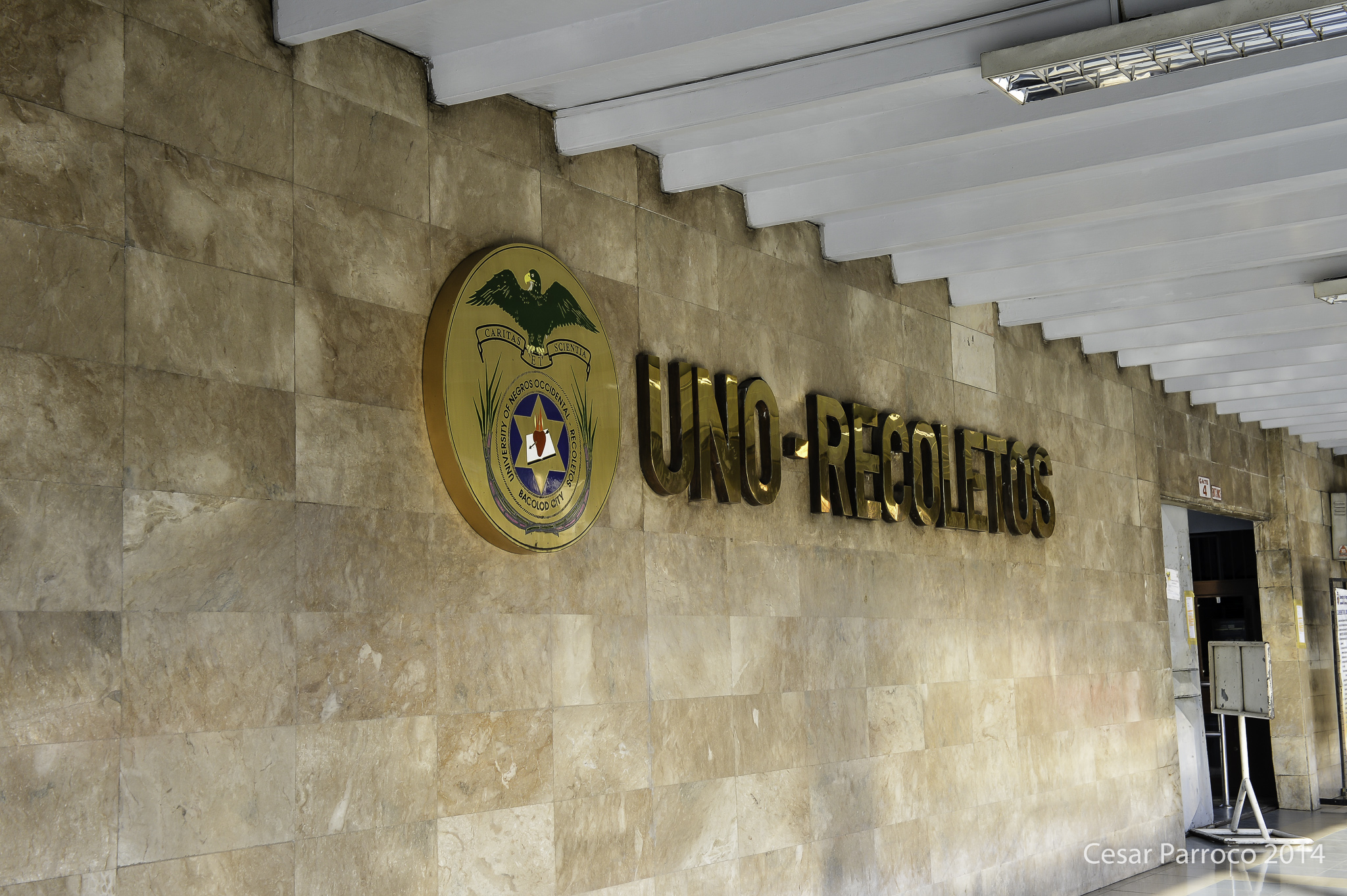
Entrance to UNO-Recoletos

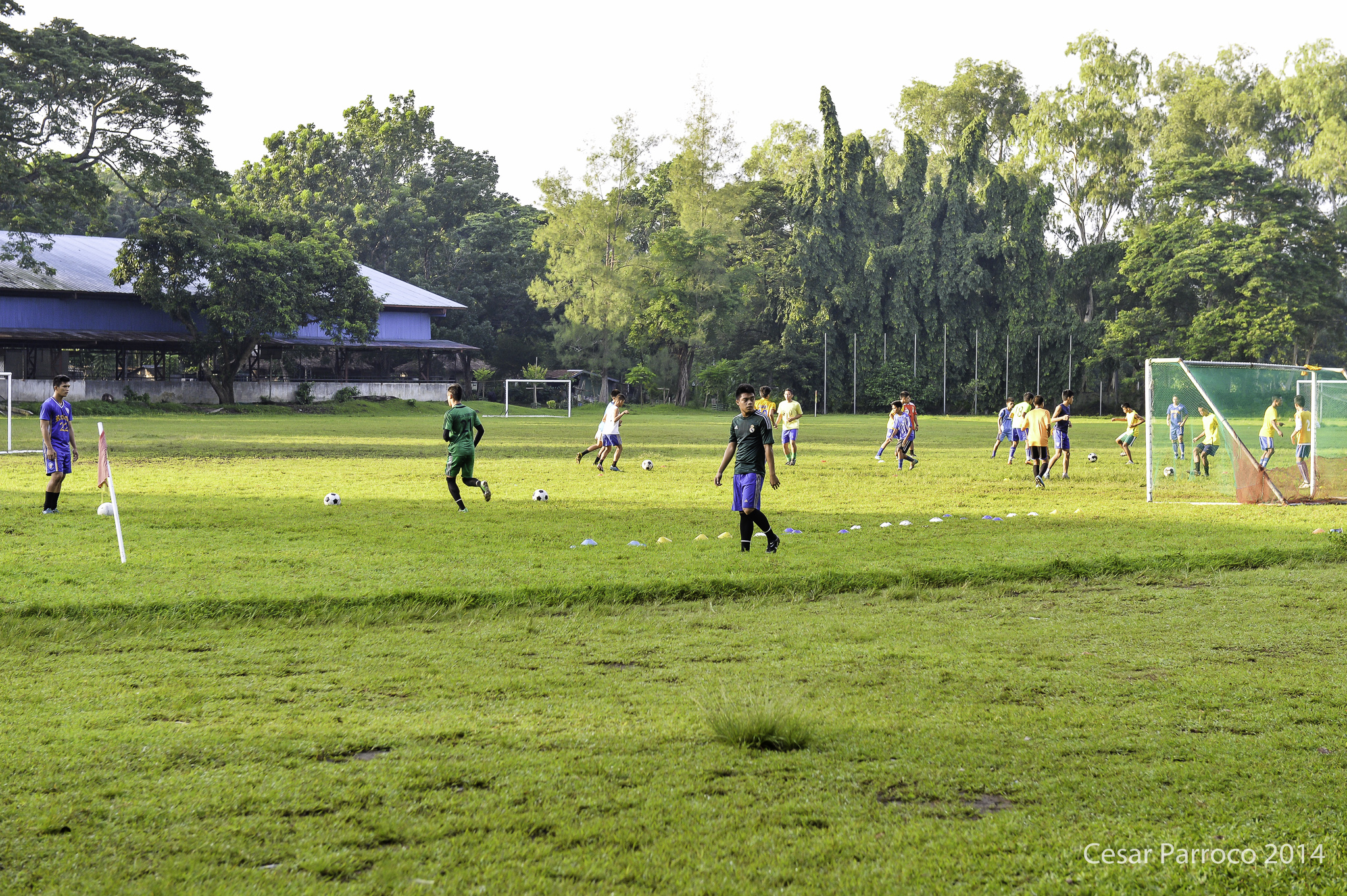
Football field

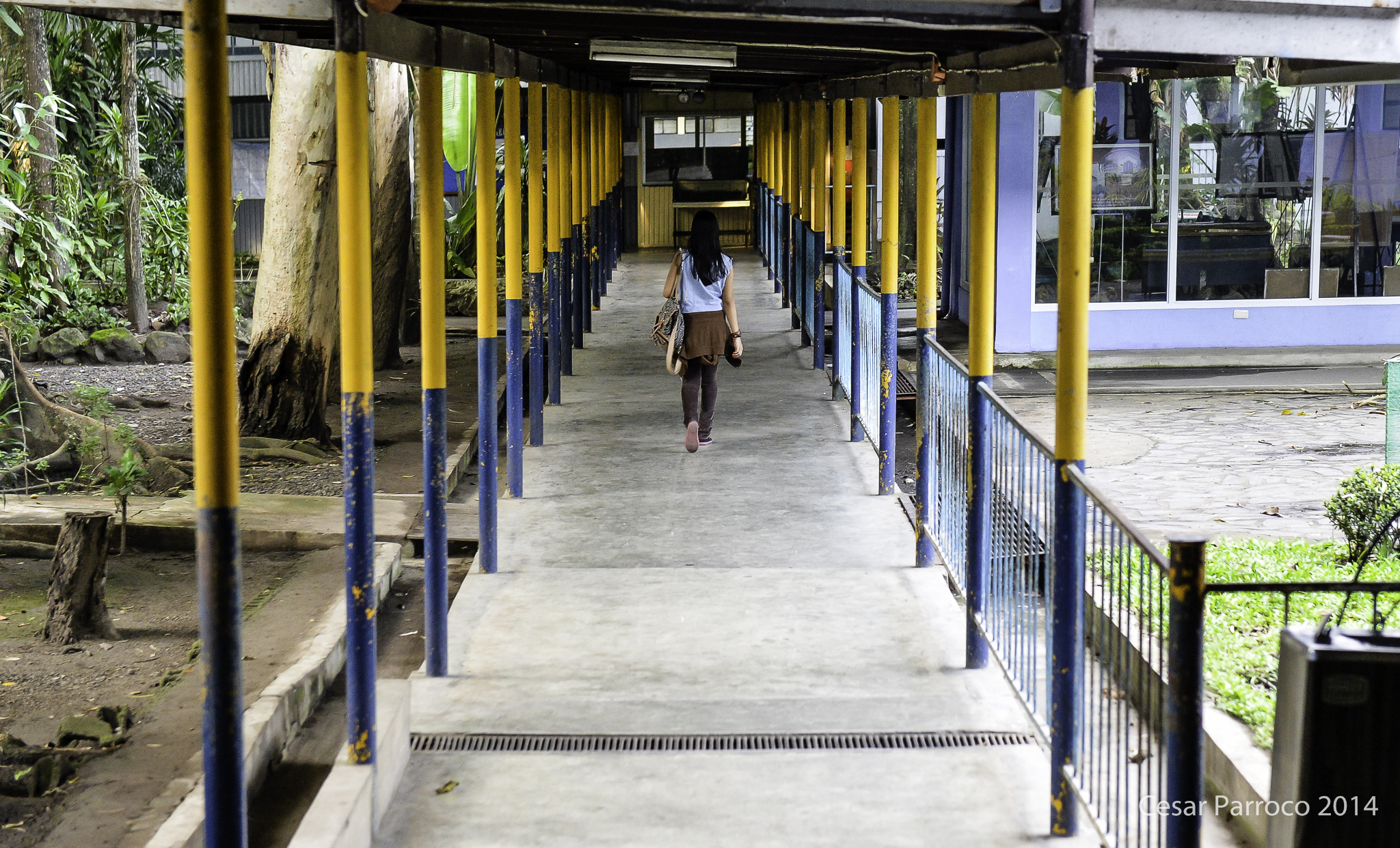
Covered catwalk

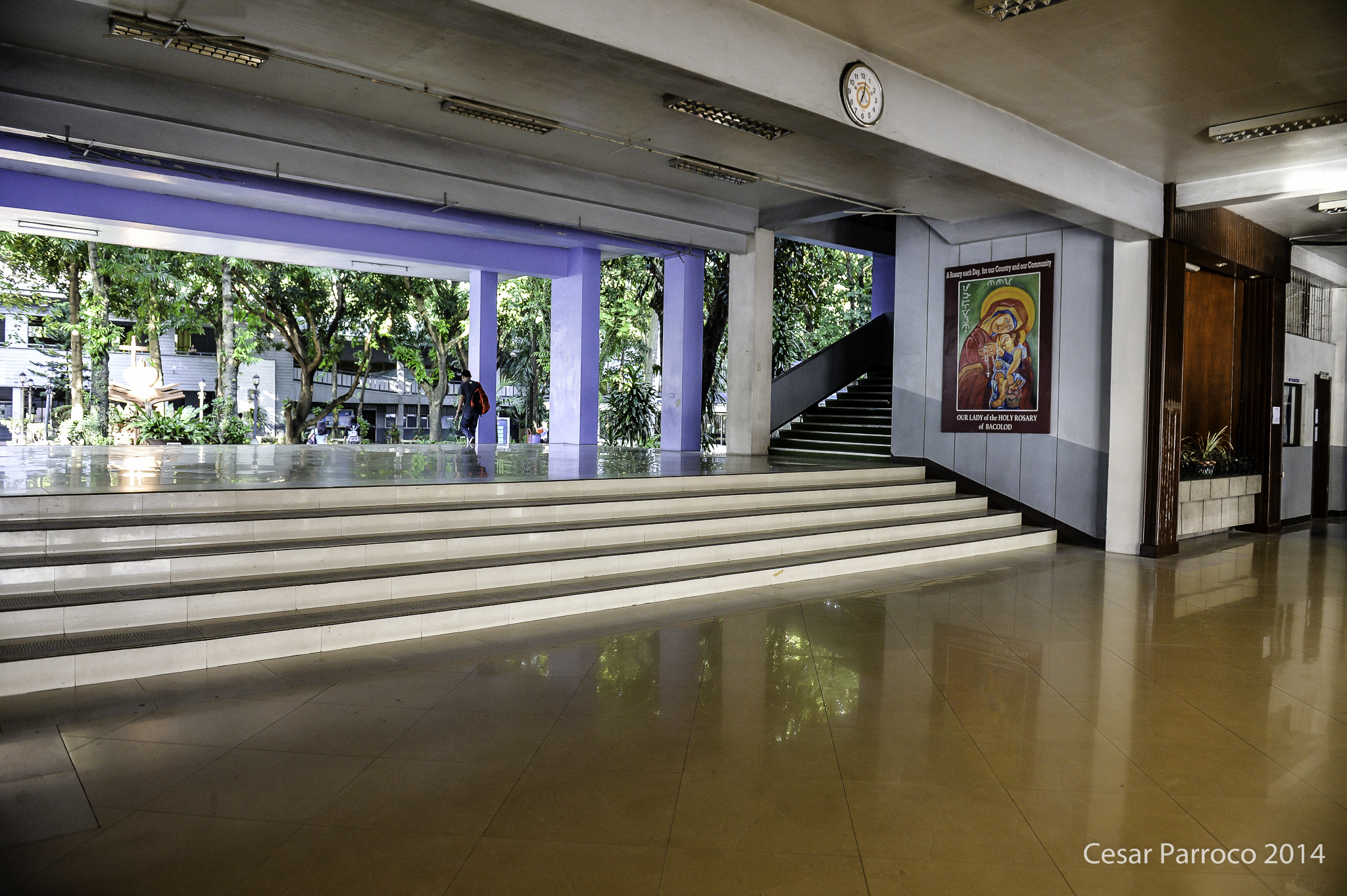
Main lobby

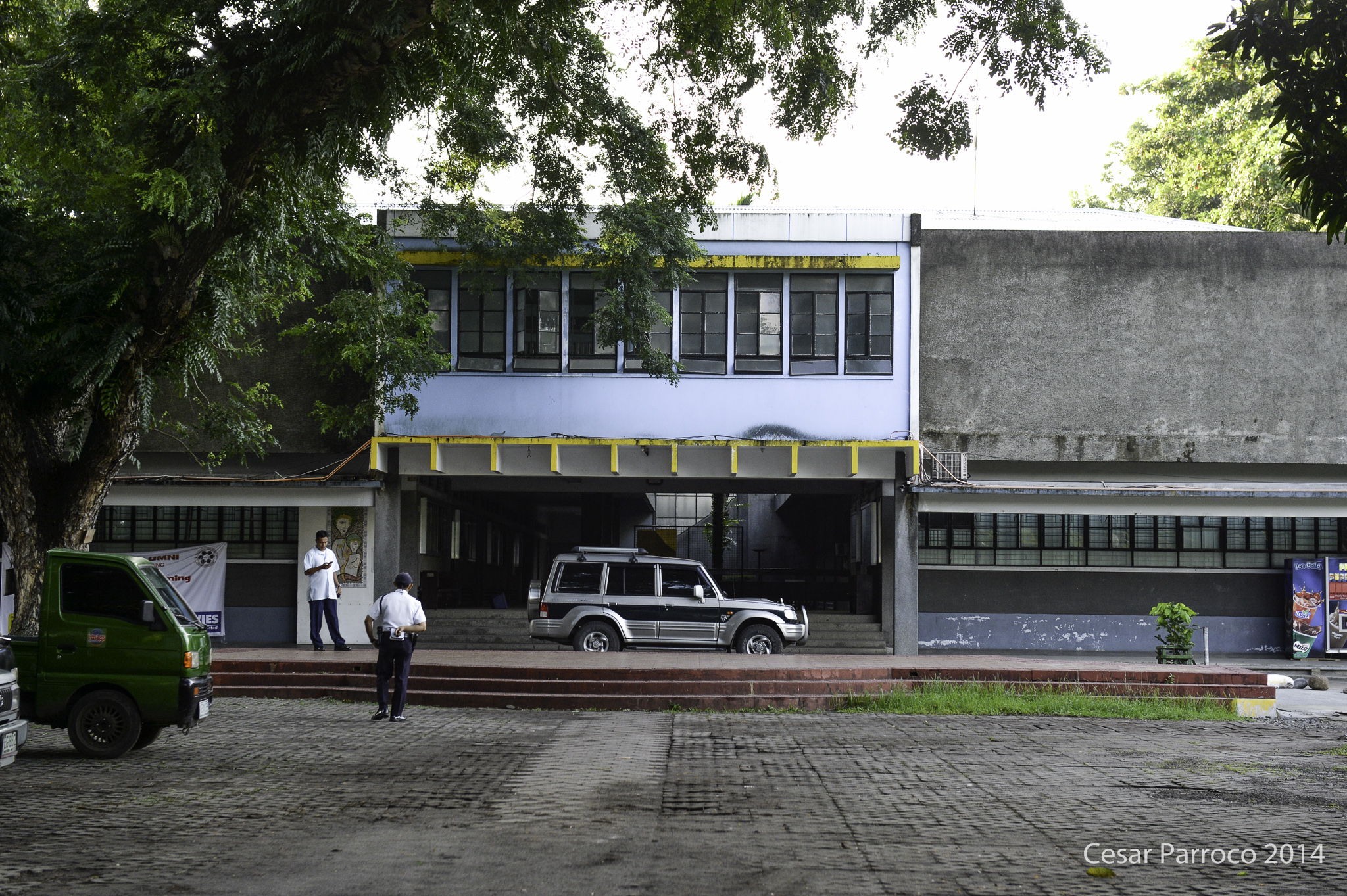
College of Engineering building

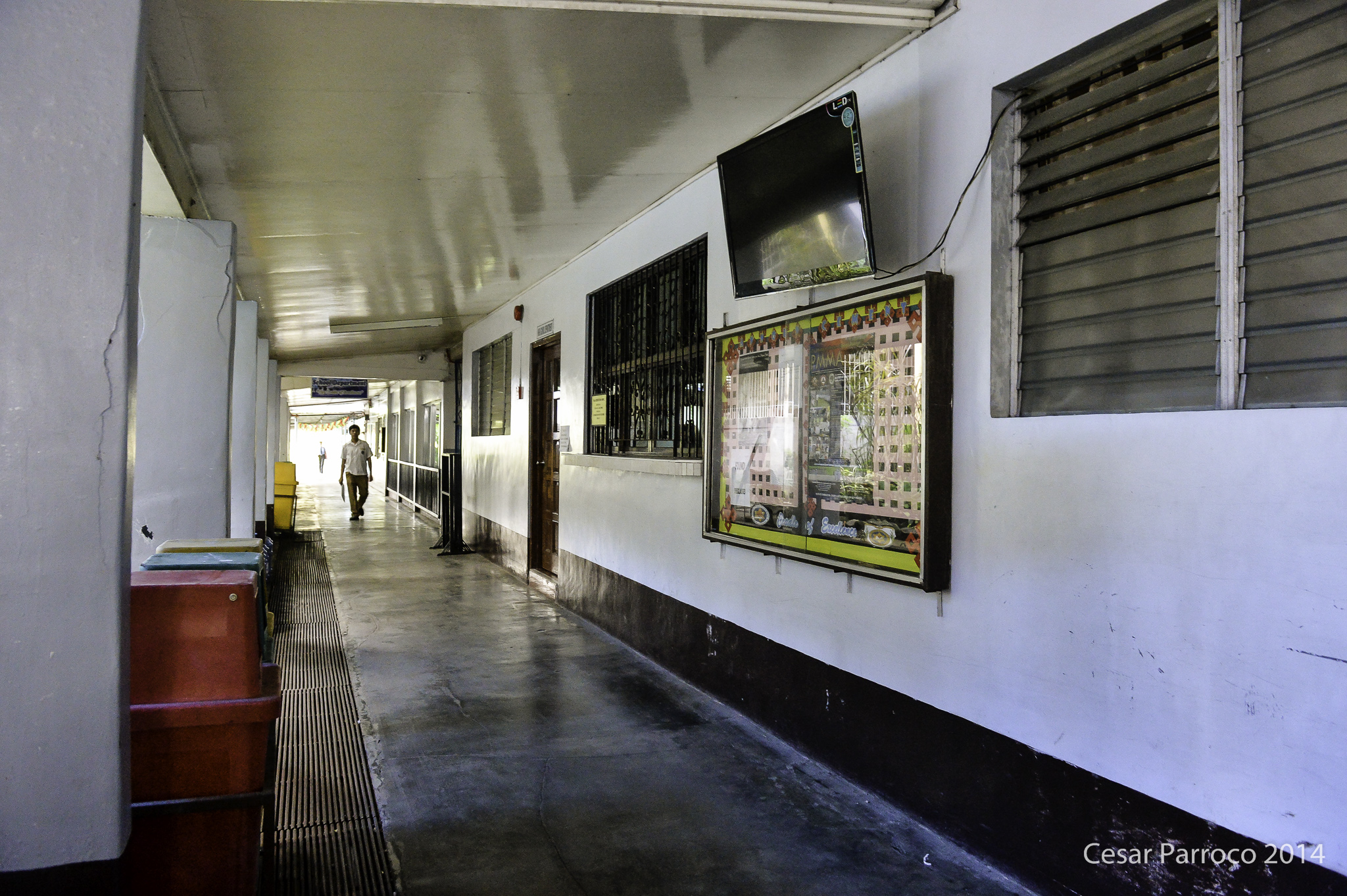
Grade School department hallway

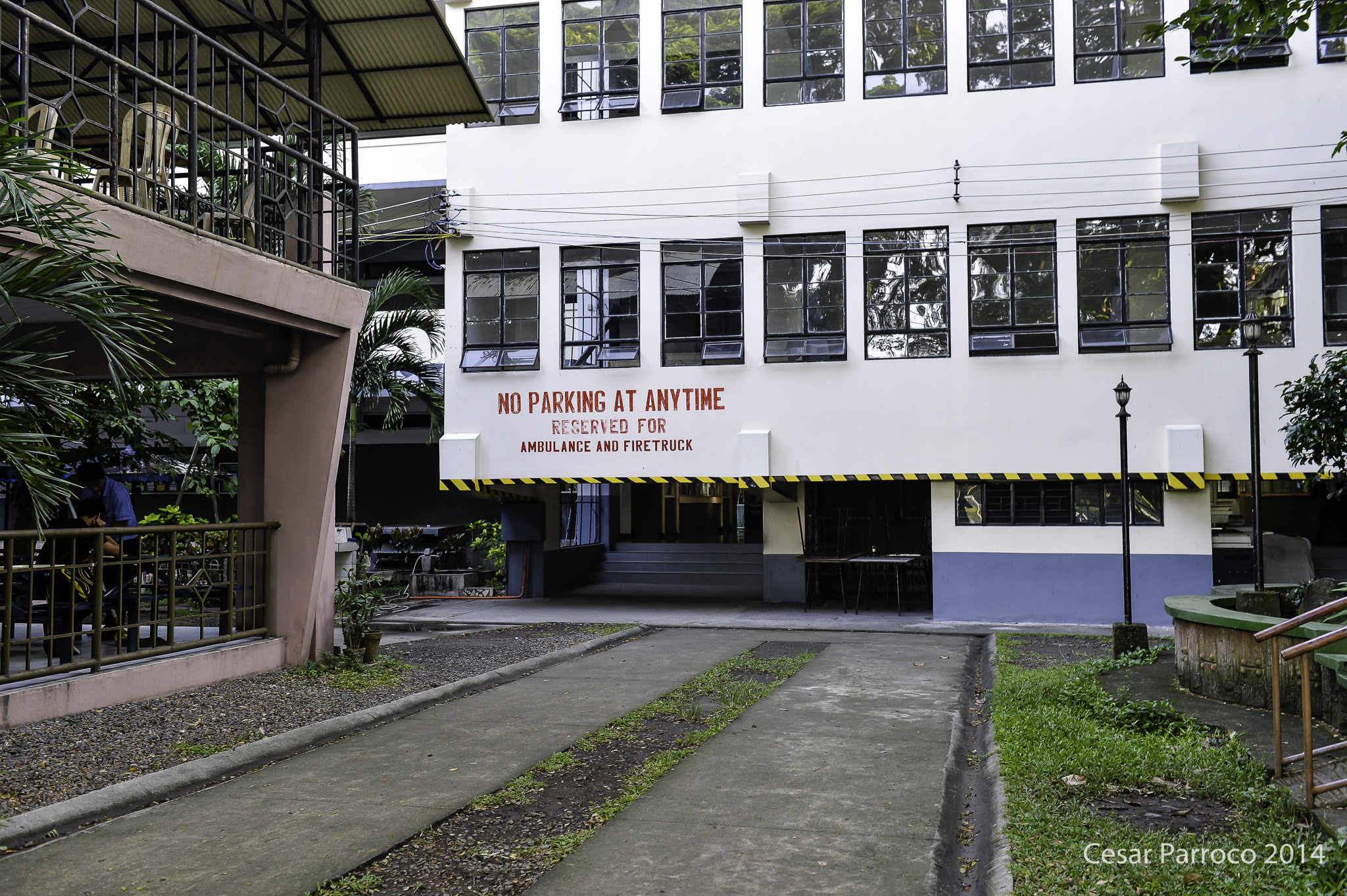
College of Business and Accountancy building

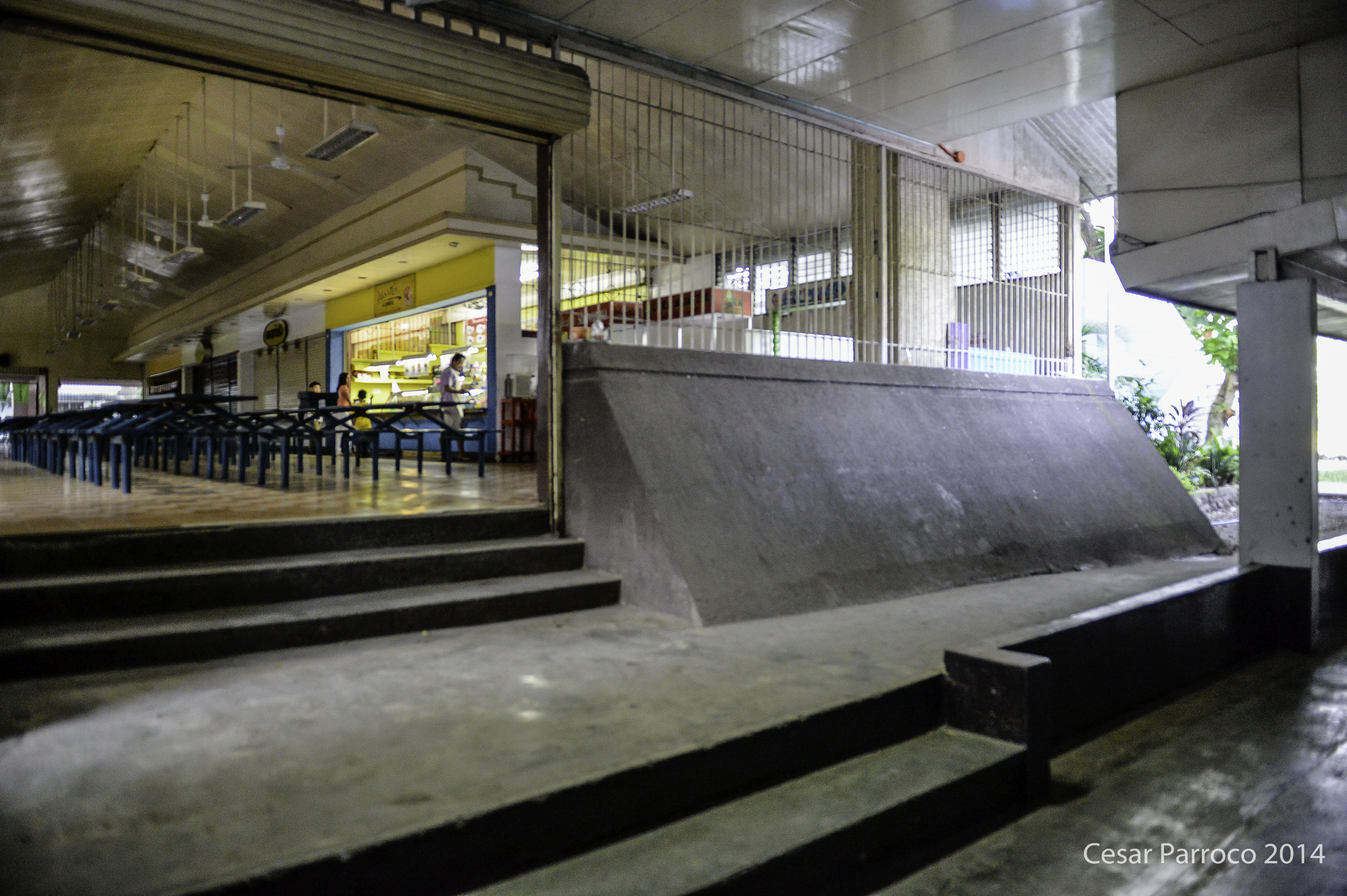
UNO-Recoletos canteen

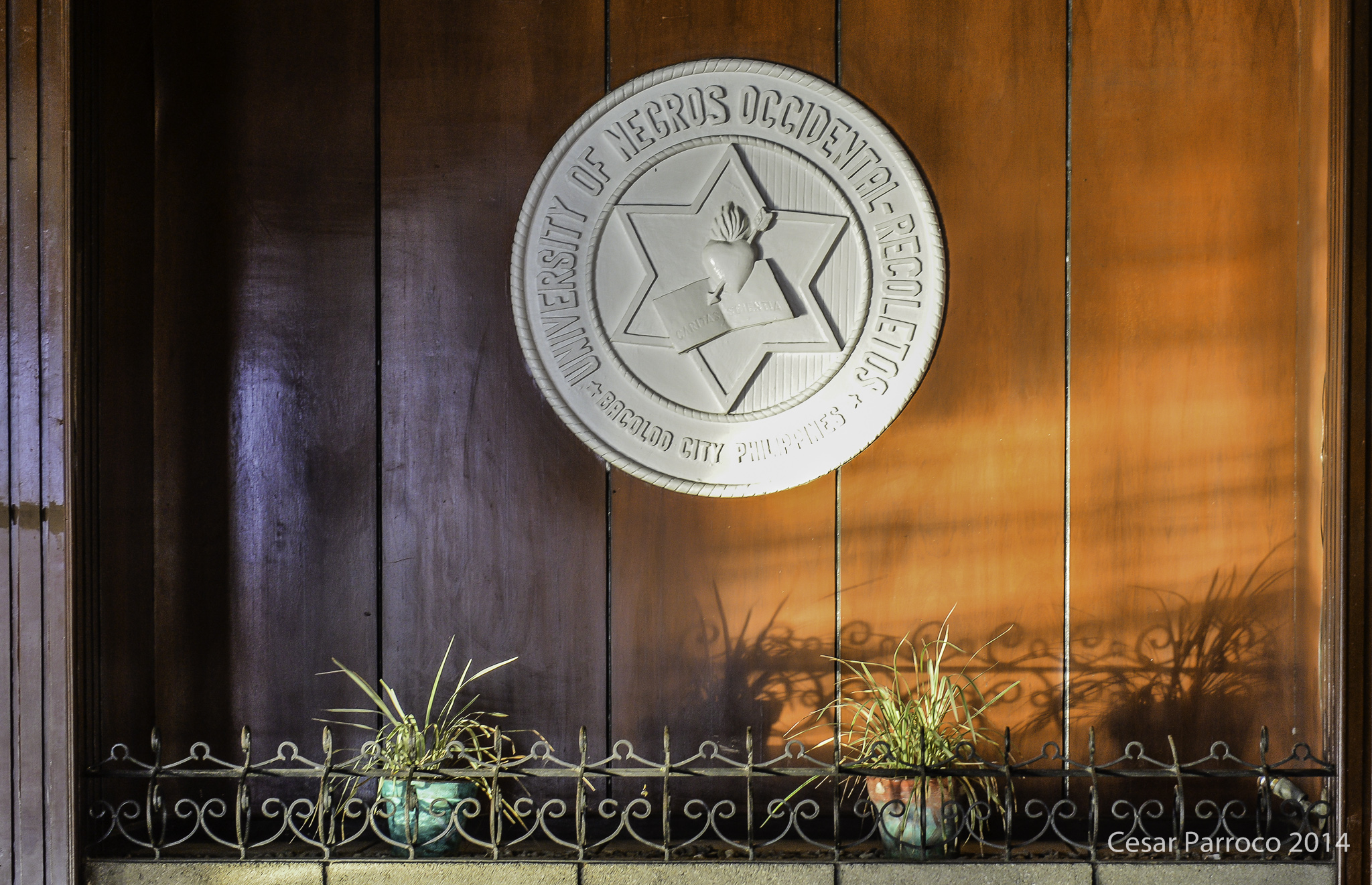
The UNO-Recoletos insignia

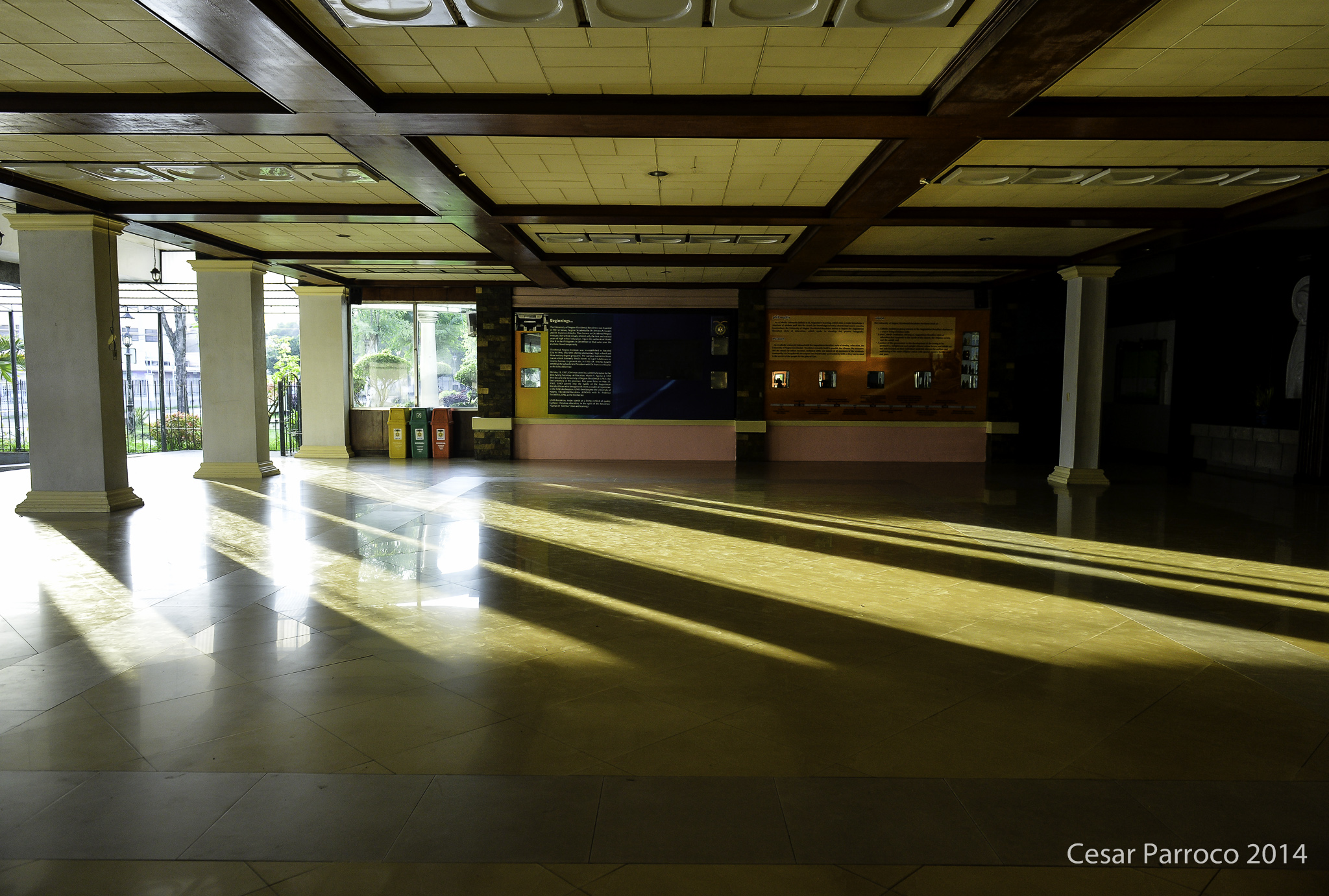
Inside UNO-Recoletos lobby

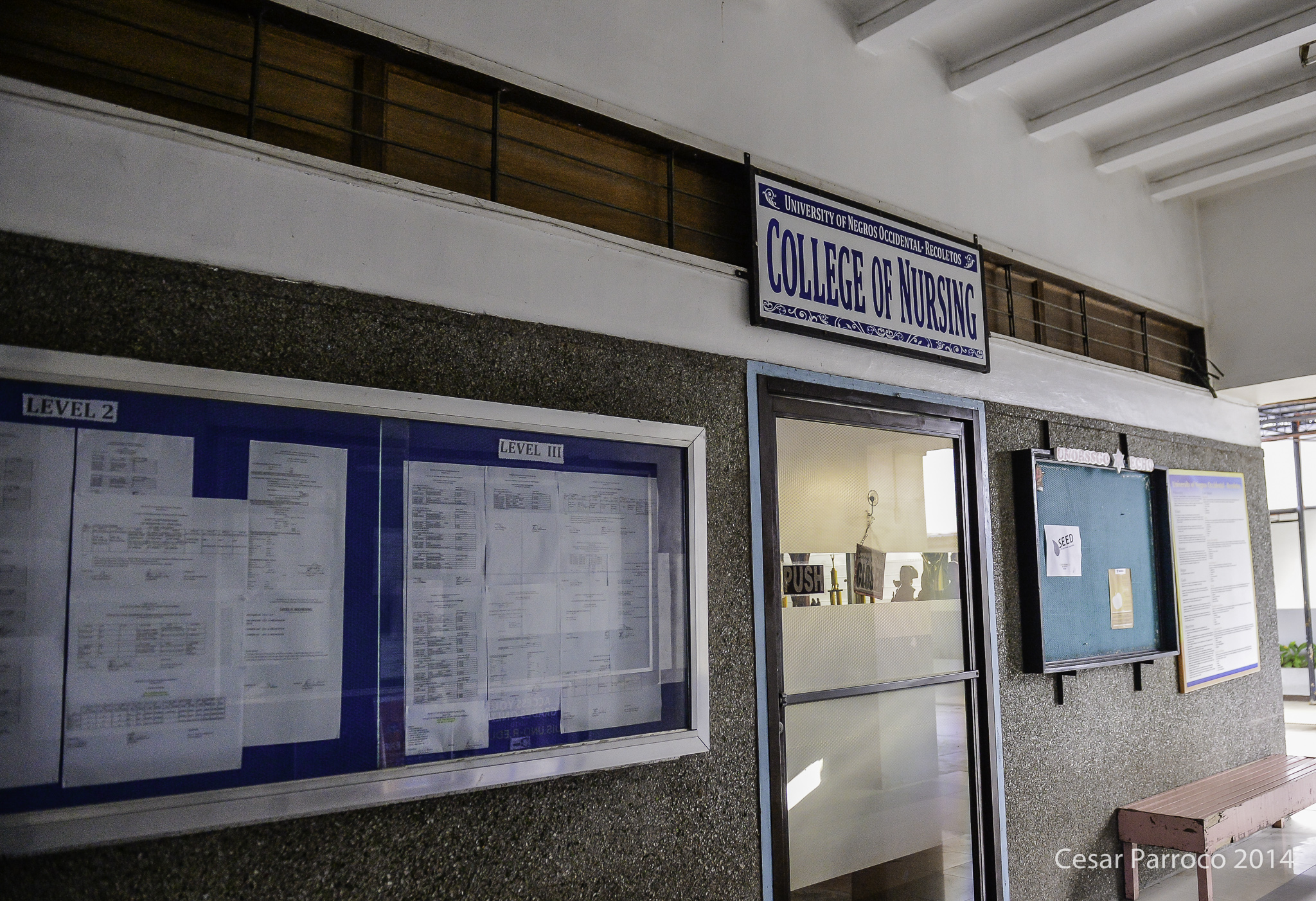
College of Allied Medical Health Sciences (formerly College of Nursing) department office

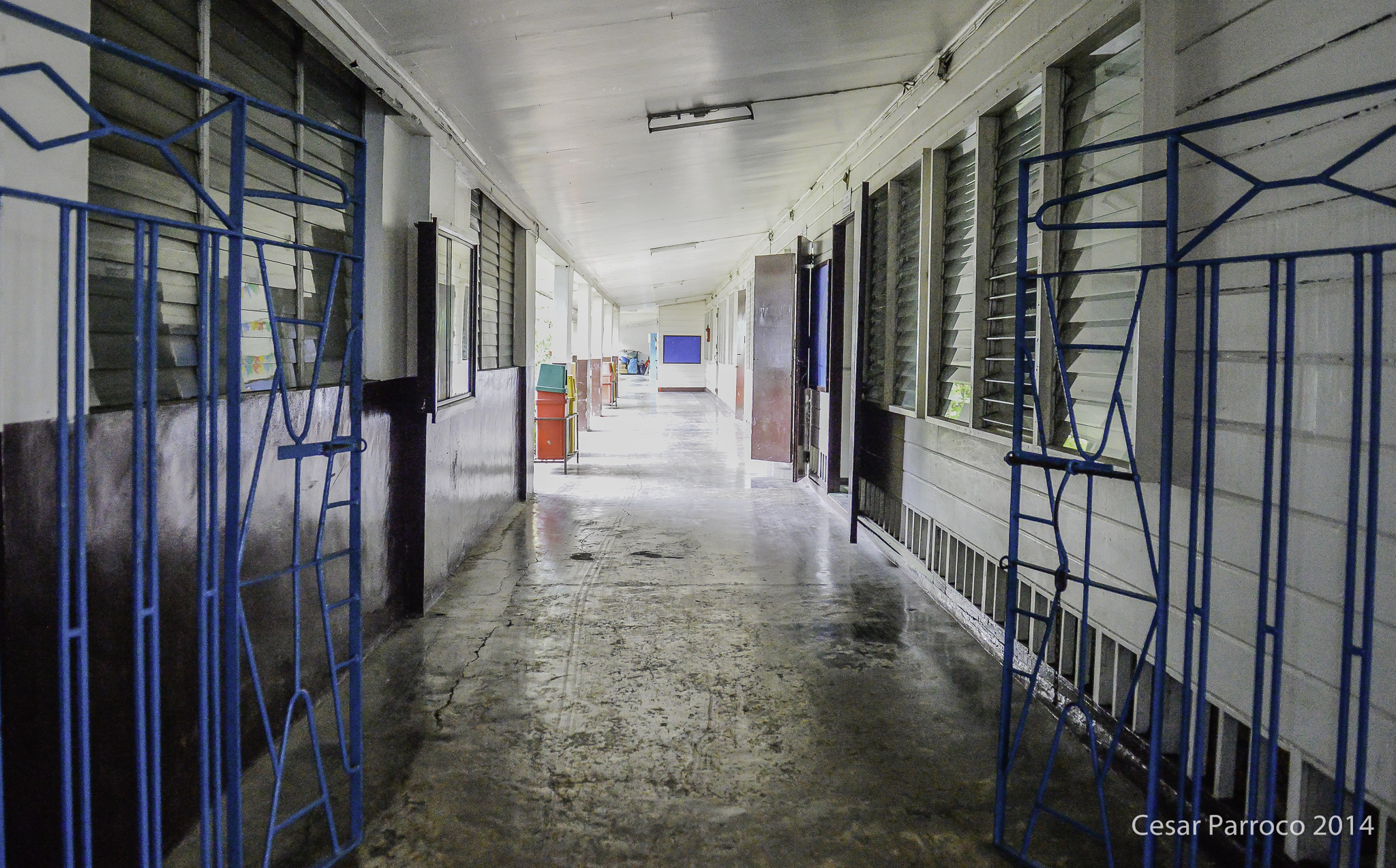
Junior High School department hallway
