= Qatar women's national basketball team =

National basketball team

Qatar
- FIBA ranking: NR (14 September 2026)
- FIBA zone: FIBA Asia
- National federation: QBF
- Coach: (Argentina) Iván Guerrero

Olympic Games
- Appearances: None

World Cup
- Appearances: None

Asia Cup
- Appearances: None
Home	Away

The Qatar women's national basketball team represents Qatar in international competitions. It is administered by the Qatar Basketball Federation. (Arabic: الاتحاد القطري لكرة السلة)

== See also ==
- Qatar men's national basketball team
- Qatar men's national under-19 basketball team
- Qatar men's national under-16 basketball team
- Qatar men's national 3x3 team
