= Aklan Catholic College =

Roman Catholic college in Aklan, Philippines

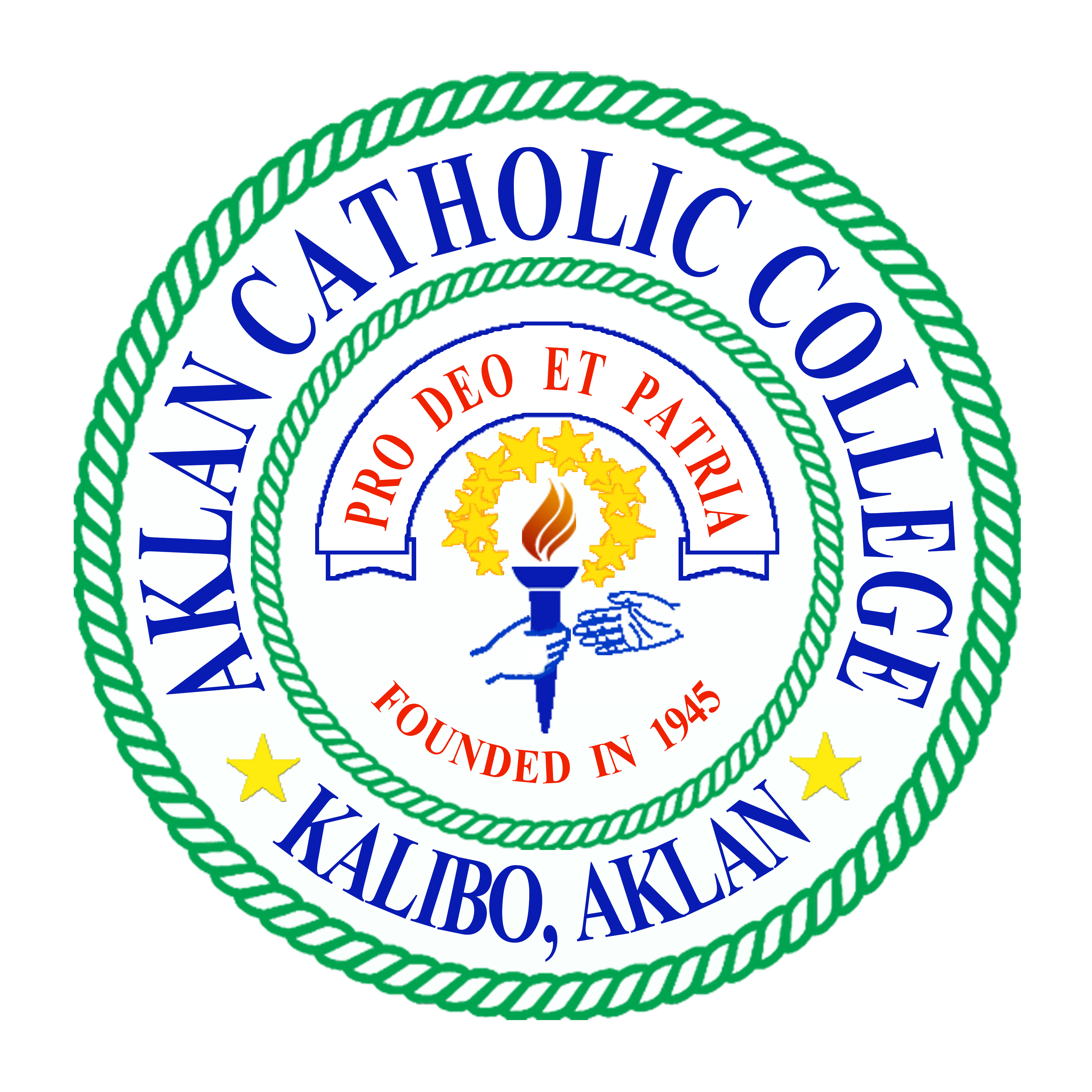
- Motto: Pro Deo Et Patria (Latin)
- Motto in English: For God and Country
- Type: Private Roman Catholic Coeducational Basic and Higher education institution
- Established: 1945
- Religious affiliation: Roman Catholic (Diocese of Kalibo)
- Rector-President: Rev. Fr. Jose Gualberto I. Villasis
- Location: Archb. Gabriel M. Reyes St., Kalibo, Aklan, Philippines; 11°42′38″N 122°21′47″E
- Website: acc.edu.ph/v1/

- Location in the Visayas Location in the Philippines

Aklan Catholic College is a private Catholic college in Kalibo, Aklan, Philippines.

== History ==
The college was established in 1945, right after World War II. It was first called Aklan College. It occupied a building at the corner of Plaridel (now Pastrana) and XIX Martyrs Streets. In June 1948, the college moved to its present site in G.M. Reyes Street. Two years later, it faced financial struggles. It would become a Catholic institution as the then Diocese of Jaro donated funds to support the fledgling school. In turn, the college adopted religious instruction.

In 2004, the college was officially renamed Aklan Catholic College.

== Campus ==
ACC has two campuses. The older one is in Poblacion, beside the Kalibo Cathedral. It houses the business and education departments.

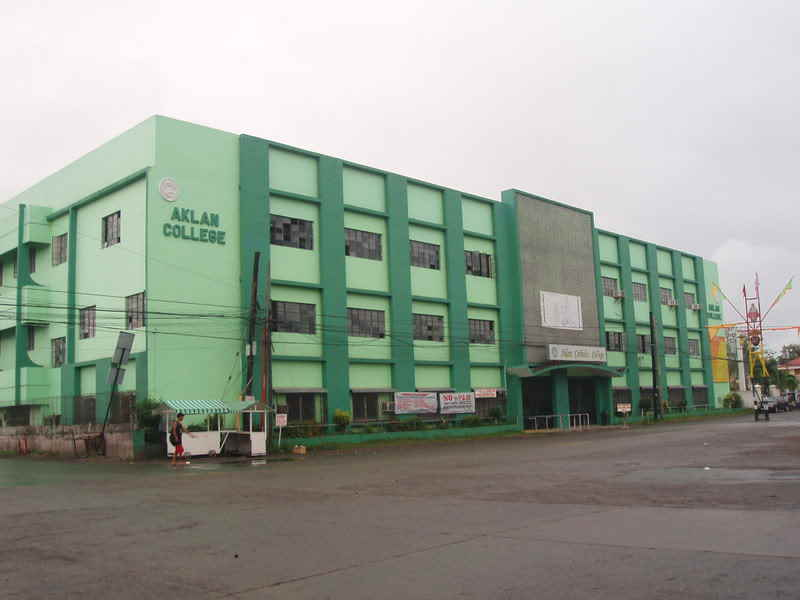
The main campus of Aklan Catholic College in Poblacion, Kalibo

The Mabasa campus, on the other hand, is located in a three-hectare lot in Brgy. Andagao. On it stands the engineering and high school departments.

== Academics ==
ACC offers courses in education, business administration, liberal arts and hospitality management, among others.

The school also offers a master's degree in educational management, guidance counselling, and business administration; as well as a Juris Doctor degree.

== Notable alumni ==
- Carlito Marquez, governor of Aklan (2004-2013)
- Gabrielle Calizo-Quimpo, vice-governor of Aklan (2007-2016)
- Gene Fuentes, vice mayor of Tangalan, Aklan (2022-2025)
