= University of Southern Philippines Foundation =

Private university in Cebu City, Philippines

- Former names: Southern Institute; Southern College; University of Southern Philippines
- Type: private, nonsectarian, foundation, coeducational basic and higher education institution
- Established: 1927; 99 years ago
- President: Dr. Amelia A. Biglete
- Students: 7,000+
- Location: Cebu City, Cebu, Philippines; 10°19′45″N 123°54′04″E
- Campus: Urban Main: Salinas Dr., Brgy. Lahug, Cebu City Satellite: Mabini St., Brgy. Central, Cebu City
- Sporting affiliations: CESAFI
- Mascot: Panther
- Website: www.uspf.edu.ph

The University of Southern Philippines Foundation (USPF) is a private, non-sectarian university in Cebu City, Philippines.

== Historical background ==
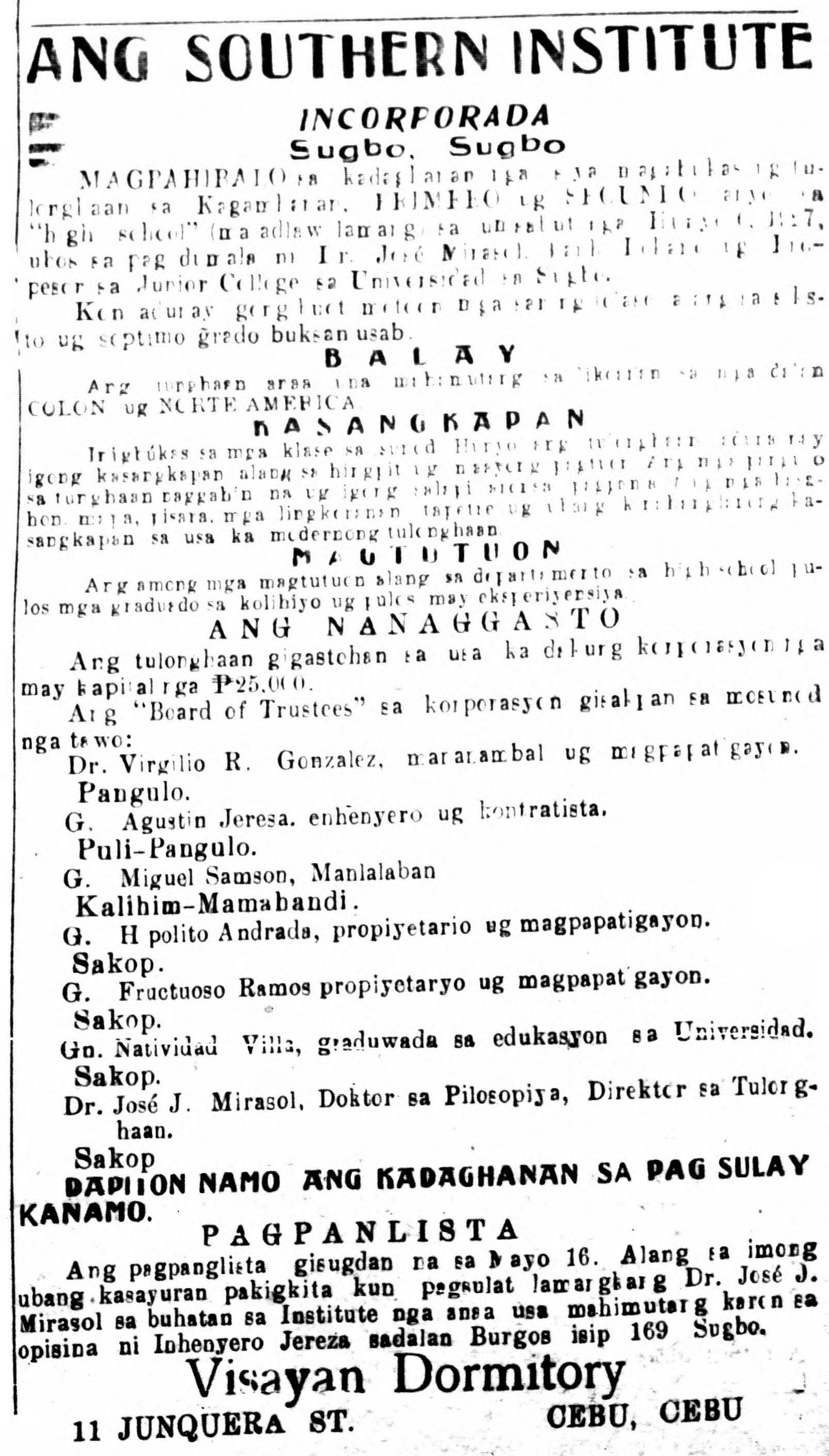
Southern Institute, 1927

The University of Southern Philippines Foundation (USPF) was founded by:

- Agustin Jereza, a civil engineer from the State University of Iowa;
- Virgilio Gonzales, a doctor of medicine from the University of the Philippines;
- Miguel Sanson, a practicing attorney;
- Mrs. Natividad Villa-Albino, a school teacher;
- Felipe Ouano, Fructuoso Ramos, and Hipolito Andrada, businessmen; and
- Dr. Jose Mirasol, a chemist and former dean of the Cebu Junior College, then the Cebu branch of the University of the Philippines. Dr. Mirasol served as the first director of the school.

The University of Southern Philippines was first called Southern Institute at the time it was founded on May 14, 1927. The Southern Institute was granted a permit to operate a complete elementary course and the first two years of secondary education on May 29, 1927. At first, classes were held in a rented building in Colon Street, Cebu City, with 121 students. Two years later, on August 28, 1929, the government recognition of the secondary course was granted and the school produced fifteen graduates.

In 1933, with the increase in the school population, Southern Institute moved to its own two-story concrete building on Mabini Street. In the same year, the College of Commerce was opened. It began with 11 students. In 1935, the College of Liberal Arts, the College of Civil Engineering, and the College of Law were opened. On February 19, 1937, the College of Law was granted government recognition.

In 1937, the Southern Institute changed its name to the Southern College.

In 1939, the Southern College began to offer the Junior Normal Course as there was a great demand for elementary school teachers then. In 1940, the College of Education was opened. The Junior Normal Course and the College of Commerce were granted Government Recognition No. 175 s. 1941 on August 9, 1941.

The Second World War from 1942 to 1944 razed the school buildings to the ground with the exception of the façade of the Administration Building. The U.S. Army occupied the campus. After the war, the school was reconstructed using the surplus materials bought from the U.S. Army.

The school was re-opened in 1945, at Camputhaw (now Lahug), three kilometers from the old site, as all its old buildings were destroyed as a result of the war. The school offered courses in Liberal Arts, Law, and the College of Education. The College of Commerce and College of Civil Engineering were re-opened in 1946. The government recognition of all these courses were renewed and granted in 1947.

On July 1, 1949, the Southern College was granted Government Recognition No. 258 Series of 1949–1950 to operate a postgraduate course in education, specifically Master of Arts in education, which paved the way for attaining a university status. The name Southern College was changed to University of Southern Philippines on July 8, 1949. The graduate courses offered then were Master of Arts in education, Master of Arts in English, Master of Arts in Teaching Sociology, and Master of Arts in Teaching English.

All the above expansions caused the Mabini Campus to extend itself to V. Gullas (formerly Manalili) and P. Burgos streets, where the Sanson and Doña Beatriz Hall that housed the Elementary Department, the Gonzales Hall that housed the College of Engineering, and the Home Economics Building are located.

In 1959, the stockholders agreed to dissolve the original stock corporation and converted USP into a non-stock, non-profit foundation. On May 28, 1959, it was officially registered with SEC as the University of Southern Philippines Foundation.

Envisioning the eventual congestion at the Mabini Campus and noting the trend of dispersal among educational institutions in the suburbs, Don Agustin Jereza in 1962 established the USP Lahug Campus, which is located in Salinas Drive. The Lahug Campus is now the main campus of the university.

USP founder, Engr. Agustin Jereza died in 1968, leaving behind a rich legacy of educational opportunities. His heirs have picked up the challenge and are exerting every effort to perpetuate the ideals of the university as envisioned by the founder.

In 1970, Engr. Oscar Jereza Sr. formally assumed the position as the President of the University of Southern Philippines. During the same year, the Master of Laws was offered and in 1975, Master of Science in Social Work was added in the graduate school curricular offerings.

In 1986, the Graduate School expanded with the opening of the Doctor of Education program.

On January 25, 1989, fire gutted the Administration Building at the Mabini Campus that housed the library and the administrative offices. In 1989–90, the University President, Engr. Oscar Jereza Sr., announced the decision reached by the board of trustees to temporarily stop operations in all levels at the Mabini Campus. This was aimed at cutting down on cost by concentrating in one campus; that is, the Lahug Campus. Recognizing the moral obligation of the institution towards the students, classes were conducted for all graduating students at the Lahug Campus during 1990–91. No new enrollees, however, were admitted to college.

By 1991–92, the university, under the leadership of the new president, Dr. Ronald R. Duterte, decided to reopen college operations phasing in the courses by year levels; that is, first year of all recognized courses was offered during this school year; first and second year by 1992–93, and so on until all years are opened.

In February 1995, USPF opened the non-academic skills-based Continuing Education Department, now known as the Learning Resource Center, in partnership with the Manpower Resource Center.

In August 1996, the USP Alumni Hall, which houses the famous Rizaliana Museum, was inaugurated.

In 1995–96, Bachelor of Science in Accountancy was given Government Recognition to conduct and operate the said course.

In June 1999, the College of Law re-opened and a new graduate program, Master of Science in Environmental Management, was offered.

On January 28, 2003, the Commission on Higher Education (CHED) issued a permit for USPF to open and conduct the First Year of the four-year Bachelor of Science in Nursing starting June 2003.

On March 5, 2003, CHED issued Government Recognition No. 104 s. 2003 to conduct and operate the four-year Bachelor of Science in Information Technology (BSIT) course, effective SY 2003–2004.

Two years after the groundbreaking for the Agustin Jereza Building, on January 6, 2004, it already became home to the College of Nursing, College of Law, College of Computer Studies and Information Technology, the College of Engineering and Architecture, and the Escolastico Duterte Library.

Additional courses opened during the School Year 2004–2005, specifically Bachelor of Science in Office Administration, Bachelor of Science in pharmacy, Diploma in Special Education, and Diploma in Professional Education.

On June 10, 2005, CHED issued Government Recognition to conduct and open the Post Baccalaureate Diploma in Community Development and Bachelor of Science Entrepreneurship.

On December 1, 2005, the Board of Trustees appointed Dr. Alicia P. Cabatingan as the new University President following the death of Dr. Ronald R. Duterte in November 2005. Dr. Cabatingan paved the way for the PACUCOA Accreditation of the different programs of the university.

In February 2006, the College of Arts and Sciences and the College of Education successfully passed the PACUCOA Level I Accreditation.

During the school year 2007–2008, USPF topped in two of the most prestigious licensure exams in the country. In the same year, the university processed the accreditation of the School of Business and Management, the College of Computer Studies and Information Technology, and the Basic Education departments of the Mabini and Lahug campuses.

On July 1, 2017, after the retirement of Dr. Alicia P. Cabatingan, Atty. Paulino A. Yabao was installed as the new University President.

In 2017, the installation of CCTVs in the Lahug Campus was completed by the Health, Safety, & Security department in 2017. The SHS Lahug achieved a 100% TESDA NCII ASSESSMENT passing rate for all their Technical Vocational Livelihood courses. The College of Nursing got a 100% Passing Percentage in the June 2017 Philippine Nurse Licensure Examination (PNLE), and 87.50% in the November 2017 PNLE.

The SHS Lahug held their first commencement exercises in March 2018.

In June 2018, the Elementary Lahug campus received a reissuance of DepEd Government Recognition. The university also began test use of Canvas LMS in SHS for the school year.

The improved board/bar ops program to improve the passing performance of courses with government licensure examinations was launched on August 28, 2018. The College of Nursing Class of 2018 earned an 81.25% passing rate in the Philippine Nurse Licensure Examination (PNLE).

Starting the second semester of School Year 2018–2019, the university was granted by CHED an authority to offer ETEEAP in Business Management courses.

In December 2018, the College of Computer Studies won the first prize for the Lockton Legacy on innovative research, which was awarded in January in 2019 and recognized by PACUCOA in December 2020.

In May 2019, the Quality Assurance Office underwent reorganization. The Center for Research, Planning & Development and its research program also underwent a reorganization during the first semester of SY 2019–2020, subsequently necessitating the creation of the Research Ethics Committee during the same semester. Starting June 2019, the SHS and Tertiary department began using Canvas LMS.

In August 2019, the College of Social Work placed Top 5 and 7 in the Social Worker Licensure Examination. The School of Business and Management Master in Business Administration program was granted Government Recognition (GR) in the same month.

On September 10–12, 2019, the following programs were visited and granted the following PACUCOA accreditations:

- Bachelor of Science in Nursing - Level I Accredited
- Bachelor of Science in Social Work - Level I Accredited
- Bachelor of Elementary education - Level II 2nd Reaccredited
- Elementary Lahug - Level III First Reaccredited
- High School Lahug - Level III First Reaccredited

Also, the Learning Resource Center was re-assessed by TESDA and was authorized to continue as a TESDA Accredited Assessment Center for the following programs: Food & Beverage Service NC II, Bread & Pastry Production NC II, Barista NC II, Cookery NC II, and Housekeeping NC II.

In November 2019, the Elementary Lahug campus received PACUCOA Level III Reaccredited Status. The College of Nursing Class of 2019 earned a 90.91% passing rate in the Philippine Nurse Licensure Examination (PNLE).

On November 13, 2019, USPF was granted donee status by the Philippine Council for NGO Certification, Inc.

In 2019, the Health, Safety, & Security department initiated the University Disaster Risk Reduction Management Team (UDRRMT) and completed installation of CCTVs in both campuses.

In January 2020, the College of Nursing was granted PACUCOA Level 1 accreditation.

On February 21, 2020, the Bureau of Internal Revenue granted USPF certified donee status.

The Guidance and Testing Services Center inked a partnership with Tanglaw Mental Health to optimize COVID-19 mental health support in 2020.

In August 2020, the Basic Education department started using C&E's Excello and Kite LMS.

SBM's Bachelor of Science in Management Accounting (BSMA) was granted Temporary Permit (TP) for First Year to Third Year starting School Year 2020–2021.

In December 2020, the PACUCOA recognized the Elementary School Lahug as the first Elementary program to have been granted LIII Reaccredited Status in Region VII and JHS Lahug as the first High School program to have been granted LIII Reaccredited Status in Region VII. SHS Lahug continues to achieve 100% TESDA NCII ASSESSMENT passing rate for all their Technical Vocational Livelihood courses.

The School of Business and Accountancy Bachelor of Science in Entrepreneurship was granted a Government Permit effective First Semester of SY 2021–2022.

The Mabini campus underwent significant renovations in preparation for the PACUCOA Level II 2nd Reaccreditation, which was successfully conducted in the second semester of School Year 2020–2021.

== Curricular offerings ==
=== Graduate School ===
==== Doctor of Education ====
major in:

- Educational Management

==== Master of Arts in Education ====
major in:

- Educational Management
- Curriculum and Instruction
- Elementary Education
- Early Childhood Education
- Math Education
- Science Education
- English Language Teaching
- Physical Education
- Special Education

=== School of Law ===
- Juris Doctor

=== Undergraduate programs ===
==== College of Computer Studies ====
- BS Computer Science
- BS Information Technology

==== College of Engineering & Architecture ====
- BS Architecture
- BS Geodetic Engineering
- BS Civil Engineering
- BS Electrical Engineering
- BS Mechanical Engineering

==== College of Health Sciences ====
- BS Nursing
- BS Pharmacy

==== College of Social Work ====
- BS Social Work
- Organizing and Community Development (Certificate Course)

==== College of Teacher Education, Arts & Sciences ====
Department of Teacher Education

- Bachelor of Secondary Education

major in: English/Science

- Bachelor of Elementary Education
- Diploma in Professional Education
- Diploma in Special Education

Department of Arts & Sciences

- Bachelor of Arts in Political Science
- Bachelor of Science in Psychology
- Bachelor of Arts in Music

Certificate Courses

- English Language Training (ELT)
- Musikamp
- Diploma in Community Development Special Program

==== School of Business and Accountancy ====
- Bachelor of Science in Business Administration
  - Financial Management (BSBA - FM)
  - Marketing Management (BSBA - MM)
  - Operations Management (BSBA - OM)
  - Human Resource Development Management (BSBA - HRDM)
- Bachelor of Science in Accountancy
- Bachelor of Science in Management Accounting
- Bachelor of Science in Tourism Management
- Bachelor of Science in Hospitality Management
- Bachelor of Science in Entrepreneurship

==== ETEEAP (Bachelor of Science in Business Administration) ====
- Bachelor of Science in Business Administration
  - Operations Management (BSBA - OM)
  - Marketing Management (BSBA - MM)
  - Financial Management (BSBA - FM)
  - Human Resource Development Management (BSBA - HRDM)

=== Technical Education and Skills Center ===
The University of Southern Philippines Foundation Technical Education and Skills Center , formerly known as the USPF Learning Resource Center, is a Technical Education and Skills Development Authority (TESDA) Accredited Assessment Center that offers Technical-Vocational Education and Training (TVET) Programs.

The TESDA-accredited short-term courses offered at the USPF TESC are:

- Barista NC II
- Cookery NC II
- Housekeeping NC II
- Bread and Pastry NC II
- Food and Beverage Services NC II
- Trainer's Methodology Level 1

=== Basic Education ===
The Basic Education Department of both the Lahug Campus and Mabini Campus offers a complete K-12 Program and abides by the learning competencies mandated by the Department of Education. To continually provide quality education among pupils/students, the Elementary School and Junior High School of Lahug Campus have been granted PACUCOA Level III First Reaccreditation Status while Mabini Campus has been granted PACUCOA Level II Second Reaccreditation.

The Junior High School Program is an ESC participating school with the government subsidy for Grade 7 until Grade 10.

The Senior High School is a recipient of the Department of Education + PEAC Senior High School Voucher Program and offers the following strands:

- Science, Technology, Engineering, and Mathematics (STEM)
- Humanities and Social Sciences (HUMSS)
- Accountancy, Business and Management (ABM)
- Technical and Vocational Livelihood – Home Economics (TVL-HE)
- Technical and Vocational Livelihood – Information and Communication Technology (TVL-ICT)

== See also ==
- Cebu City
- Metro Cebu
- Cebu
