= 2011 FIBA Asia Championship for Women squads =

These are the team rosters of the 16 teams competing in the 2011 FIBA Asia Championship for Women.

== Level I ==
=== China ===
Head coach: Sun Fengwu

#	Pos	Name	Club	Date of birth	Height
4	G	Yang Banban	(China) Liaoning Baocheng	26 April 1989 (aged 22)	1.72 m (5 ft 7 1/2 in)
5	F	Ding Yuan	(China) Guangdong Hongjia	2 December 1991 (aged 19)	1.85 m (6 ft 1 in)
6	G	Ji Yanyan	(China) Heilongjiang Dragons	29 May 1985 (aged 26)	1.82 m (5 ft 11 1/2 in)
7	F	Zhao Shuang	(China) Shenyang Army Golden Lions	21 June 1990 (aged 21)	1.88 m (6 ft 2 in)
8	G	Miao Lijie	(China) Shenyang Army Golden Lions	3 June 1981 (aged 30)	1.78 m (5 ft 10 in)
9	C	Guan Xin	(China) Guangdong Hongjia	24 January 1987 (aged 24)	1.95 m (6 ft 5 in)
10	F	Zhang Fan	(China) Beijing Great Wall	22 August 1984 (aged 26)	1.87 m (6 ft 1 1/2 in)
11	F	Ma Zengyu	(China) Liaoning Baocheng	22 August 1984 (aged 26)	1.83 m (6 ft 0 in)
12	F	Gao Song	(China) Heilongjiang Dragons	16 April 1992 (aged 19)	1.90 m (6 ft 3 in)
13	C	Xu Nuo	(China) Jiangsu Phoenix	26 April 1987 (aged 24)	1.97 m (6 ft 5 1/2 in)
14	C	Wei Wei	(China) Guangdong Hongjia	6 October 1989 (aged 21)	2.07 m (6 ft 9 1/2 in)
15	C	Chen Nan	(China) Bayi Kylin	8 January 1983 (aged 28)	1.97 m (6 ft 5 1/2 in)

=== Chinese Taipei ===
Head coach: Chang Hui-ying

#	Pos	Name	Club	Date of birth	Height
4	G	Chen Yi-feng	(Chinese Taipei) Cathay Life	13 November 1984 (aged 26)	1.71 m (5 ft 7 1/2 in)
5	G	Chang Shih-chieh	(Chinese Taipei) Taipower	16 March 1986 (aged 25)	1.72 m (5 ft 7 1/2 in)
6	F	Chiang Feng-chun	(China) Zhejiang Chouzhou	25 October 1981 (aged 29)	1.83 m (6 ft 0 in)
7	F	Lan Jui-yu	(Chinese Taipei) Cathay Life	2 August 1983 (aged 28)	1.71 m (5 ft 7 1/2 in)
8	C	Lin Chi-wen	(Chinese Taipei) Taipower	19 August 1983 (aged 28)	1.86 m (6 ft 1 in)
9	F	Chu Yung-hsuan	(Chinese Taipei) Cathay Life	8 January 1981 (aged 30)	1.77 m (5 ft 9 1/2 in)
10	G	Li You-ruei	(Chinese Taipei) Cathay Life	23 December 1986 (aged 24)	1.80 m (5 ft 11 in)
11	G	Ma Yi-hung	(Chinese Taipei) Taiyuan Textile	27 November 1980 (aged 30)	1.76 m (5 ft 9 1/2 in)
12	G	Chiang Yi-lien	(Chinese Taipei) Applause	8 September 1982 (aged 28)	1.65 m (5 ft 5 in)
13	C	Liu Yi-chun	(Chinese Taipei) Taipower	12 March 1986 (aged 25)	1.86 m (6 ft 1 in)
14	C	Huang Shu-chen	(Chinese Taipei) Taipower	20 September 1983 (aged 27)	1.78 m (5 ft 10 in)
15	F	Liu Chun-yi	(Chinese Taipei) Taiyuan Textile	23 January 1981 (aged 30)	1.80 m (5 ft 11 in)

=== India ===
Head coach: (United States) Pete Gaudet

#	Pos	Name	Club	Date of birth	Height
4	G	Akanksha Singh		7 September 1989 (aged 21)	1.68 m (5 ft 6 in)
5	G	Bharti Netam	(India) Indian Railways	6 March 1986 (aged 25)	1.68 m (5 ft 6 in)
6	C	Geethu Anna Jose	(India) Indian Railways	30 June 1985 (aged 26)	1.85 m (6 ft 1 in)
7	G	Anitha Pauldurai	(India) Indian Railways	22 June 1985 (aged 26)	1.69 m (5 ft 6 1/2 in)
8	F	Raspreet Sidhu		18 July 1989 (aged 22)	1.69 m (5 ft 6 1/2 in)
9	F	Harjeet Kaur		3 April 1988 (aged 23)	1.87 m (6 ft 1 1/2 in)
10	F	Smruthi Radhakrishnan	(India) Indian Railways	15 April 1982 (aged 29)	1.75 m (5 ft 9 in)
11	C	Shireen Limaye	(India) Indian Railways	13 February 1995 (aged 16)	1.80 m (5 ft 11 in)
12	G	Pushpa Maddu	(India) Indian Railways	15 February 1989 (aged 22)	1.65 m (5 ft 5 in)
13	G	Kokila Subramani		25 July 1988 (aged 23)	1.65 m (5 ft 5 in)
14	G	Prashanti Singh		5 May 1984 (aged 27)	1.73 m (5 ft 8 in)
15	F	Kruthika Lakshman		26 March 1989 (aged 22)	1.77 m (5 ft 9 1/2 in)

=== Japan ===
Head coach: Fumikazu Nakagawa

#	Pos	Name	Club	Date of birth	Height
4	F	Yoko Nagi	(Japan) Fujitsu Redwave	9 May 1982 (aged 29)	1.75 m (5 ft 9 in)
5	C	Maki Takada	(Japan) Denso Iris	23 August 1989 (aged 21)	1.83 m (6 ft 0 in)
6	F	Yuka Mamiya	(Japan) JX Sunflowers	3 April 1990 (aged 21)	1.83 m (6 ft 0 in)
7	F	Ai Mitani	(Japan) Fujitsu Redwave	21 August 1978 (aged 33)	1.82 m (5 ft 11 1/2 in)
8	F	Sachiko Ishikawa	(China) Yunnan Qujing	18 August 1978 (aged 33)	1.78 m (5 ft 10 in)
9	G	Emi Kudeken	(Japan) Toyota Antelopes	3 August 1984 (aged 27)	1.65 m (5 ft 5 in)
10	C	Ramu Tokashiki	(Japan) JX Sunflowers	11 June 1991 (aged 20)	1.91 m (6 ft 3 in)
11	F	Eriko Kimura	(Japan) Fujitsu RedWave	14 March 1983 (aged 28)	1.81 m (5 ft 11 1/2 in)
12	G	Asami Yoshida	(Japan) JX Sunflowers	9 October 1987 (aged 23)	1.65 m (5 ft 5 in)
13	G	Yuko Oga	(Japan) JX Sunflowers	17 October 1982 (aged 28)	1.70 m (5 ft 7 in)
14	G	Kumiko Oba	(Japan) Denso Iris	17 May 1988 (aged 23)	1.69 m (5 ft 6 1/2 in)
15	F	Moeko Nagaoka	(Japan) Sapporo Yamanote	29 December 1993 (aged 17)	1.80 m (5 ft 11 in)

=== South Korea ===
Head coach: Lim Dal-Shik

#	Pos	Name	Club	Date of birth	Height
4	F	Kim Youn-Joo	(South Korea) Ansan Shinhan Bank S-Birds	18 April 1986 (aged 25)	1.78 m (5 ft 10 in)
5	G	Kim Ji-Yoon	(South Korea) Bucheon Shinsegae CoolCat	7 February 1976 (aged 35)	1.69 m (5 ft 6 1/2 in)
6	G	Choi Youn-Ah	(South Korea) Ansan Shinhan Bank S-Birds	24 October 1985 (aged 25)	1.68 m (5 ft 6 in)
7	G	Lee Mi-Sun	(South Korea) Yongin Samsung Life Bichumi	19 February 1979 (aged 32)	1.74 m (5 ft 8 1/2 in)
8	F	Kang A-Jeong	(South Korea) Cheongju KB Kookmin Bank Savers	25 July 1989 (aged 22)	1.79 m (5 ft 10 1/2 in)
9	F	Kim Dan-Bi	(South Korea) Ansan Shinhan Bank S-Birds	27 February 1990 (aged 21)	1.80 m (5 ft 11 in)
10	C	Lee Youn-Ha	(South Korea) Ansan Shinhan Bank S-Birds	4 June 1983 (aged 28)	1.86 m (6 ft 1 in)
11	C	Kang Young-Suk	(South Korea) Ansan Shinhan Bank S-Birds	16 September 1981 (aged 29)	1.86 m (6 ft 1 in)
12	C	Ha Eun-Joo	(South Korea) Ansan Shinhan Bank S-Birds	25 September 1983 (aged 27)	2.02 m (6 ft 7 1/2 in)
13	F	Kim Jung-Eun	(South Korea) Bucheon Shinsegae CoolCat	7 September 1987 (aged 23)	1.80 m (5 ft 11 in)
14	C	Kim Kwe-Ryong	(South Korea) Bucheon Shinsegae CoolCat	17 December 1979 (aged 31)	1.90 m (6 ft 3 in)
15	F	Sin Jung-Ja	(South Korea) Guri KDB Life Winnus	11 December 1980 (aged 30)	1.85 m (6 ft 1 in)

=== Lebanon ===
Head coach: Elie Nasr

#	Pos	Name	Club	Date of birth	Height
4	G	Sabine Fakhoury	(Lebanon) Al-Riyadi Beirut	27 September 1985 (aged 25)	1.69 m (5 ft 6 1/2 in)
5	F	Rebecca Akl	(Lebanon) Al-Riyadi Beirut	18 October 1992 (aged 18)	1.69 m (5 ft 6 1/2 in)
6	F	Marie Imad	(Lebanon) Homenetmen Antelias	5 December 1982 (aged 28)	1.80 m (5 ft 11 in)
7	C	Narine Gyokchyan	(Lebanon) Al-Riyadi Beirut	22 July 1993 (aged 18)	1.86 m (6 ft 1 in)
8	G	Aida Bakhos	(Lebanon) Al-Riyadi Beirut	21 March 1986 (aged 25)	1.76 m (5 ft 9 1/2 in)
9	F	Layla Fares	(Lebanon) Homenetmen Antelias	12 March 1989 (aged 22)	1.75 m (5 ft 9 in)
10	F	Nayla Alameddine	(Lebanon) Antranik	17 May 1982 (aged 29)	1.75 m (5 ft 9 in)
11	G	Nisrin Dandan	(Lebanon) Antranik	3 September 1977 (aged 33)	1.73 m (5 ft 8 in)
12	G	Nathalie Sevajian	(Lebanon) Homenetmen Antelias	2 February 1988 (aged 23)	1.70 m (5 ft 7 in)
13	G	Chada Nasr	(Lebanon) Antranik	20 September 1983 (aged 27)	1.74 m (5 ft 8 1/2 in)
14	C	Tamara Khalil	(Lebanon) Antranik	19 April 1986 (aged 25)	1.82 m (5 ft 11 1/2 in)
15	C	Brittany Denson	(Poland) PTS Lider Pruszków	10 June 1987 (aged 24)	1.92 m (6 ft 3 1/2 in)

== Level II ==
=== Indonesia ===
Head coach: (United States) Bill McCammon

#	Pos	Name	Club	Date of birth	Height
4	G	Marjorice Fedora Tsarine		9 July 1991 (aged 20)	1.67 m (5 ft 5 1/2 in)
5	F	Hanum Fasya		26 August 1990 (aged 20)	1.63 m (5 ft 4 in)
6	G	Yunita Sugianto		7 June 1987 (aged 24)	1.67 m (5 ft 5 1/2 in)
7	G	Maharani Adhipuspitasari		14 August 1986 (aged 25)	1.72 m (5 ft 7 1/2 in)
8	G	Yuni Anggraeni		28 June 1984 (aged 27)	1.74 m (5 ft 8 1/2 in)
9	F	Atty Juliani Achmad		16 June 1990 (aged 21)	1.74 m (5 ft 8 1/2 in)
10	F	Catryn Clorissa		20 April 1991 (aged 20)	1.75 m (5 ft 9 in)
11	G	Fanny Kalumata		17 June 1989 (aged 22)	1.75 m (5 ft 9 in)
12	G	Jacklien Ibo		25 November 1990 (aged 20)	1.75 m (5 ft 9 in)
13	F	Yulinda Wati		24 July 1987 (aged 24)	1.74 m (5 ft 8 1/2 in)
14	F	Wulan Ayu Ningrum		14 March 1985 (aged 26)	1.74 m (5 ft 8 1/2 in)
15	C	Gabriel Sophia		22 November 1991 (aged 19)	1.80 m (5 ft 11 in)

=== Kazakhstan ===
Head coach: Tatyana Kondius

#	Pos	Name	Club	Date of birth	Height
4	F	Tamara Seregina	(Kazakhstan) BK Almaty	10 January 1990 (aged 21)	1.80 m (5 ft 11 in)
6	C	Anna Vinokurova	(Kazakhstan) Irtysh Pavlodar-PNHZ	18 December 1992 (aged 18)	1.91 m (6 ft 3 in)
7	G	Yelena Dots	(Kazakhstan) Kustanay KSTU	15 November 1989 (aged 21)	1.75 m (5 ft 9 in)
8	G	Anna Kucheryavykh	(Kazakhstan) Irtysh Pavlodar-PNHZ	12 January 1974 (aged 37)	1.78 m (5 ft 10 in)
9	G	Anastassiya Alishauskaite	(Kazakhstan) Astana Tigers	5 December 1988 (aged 22)	1.72 m (5 ft 7 1/2 in)
10	F	Oxana Ossipenko		4 January 1985 (aged 26)	1.86 m (6 ft 1 in)
11	C	Oxana Ivanova	(Kazakhstan) Astana Tigers	19 April 1990 (aged 21)	1.92 m (6 ft 3 1/2 in)
12	F	Zalina Kurazova	(Kazakhstan) Irtysh Pavlodar-PNHZ	28 January 1985 (aged 26)	1.85 m (6 ft 1 in)
14	G	Yuliya Korotkaya	(Kazakhstan) Irtysh Pavlodar-PNHZ	28 January 1977 (aged 34)	1.75 m (5 ft 9 in)
15	C	Nadezhda Kondrakova	(Kazakhstan) Irtysh Pavlodar-PNHZ	4 August 1989 (aged 22)	1.92 m (6 ft 3 1/2 in)

=== Malaysia ===
Head coach: Tan See Wah

#	Pos	Name	Club	Date of birth	Height
4	G	Saw Wei Yin		2 March 1992 (aged 19)	1.66 m (5 ft 5 1/2 in)
5	G	Teo Woon Yuen		5 February 1985 (aged 26)	1.65 m (5 ft 5 in)
6	F	Yong Shin Min		27 September 1987 (aged 23)	1.74 m (5 ft 8 1/2 in)
7	F	Ang Siew Teng		31 March 1987 (aged 24)	1.74 m (5 ft 8 1/2 in)
8	F	Nur Izzati Yaakob		16 November 1989 (aged 21)	1.60 m (5 ft 3 in)
9	G	Pang Hui Pin		29 April 1990 (aged 21)	1.76 m (5 ft 9 1/2 in)
10	F	Chen Hui Jing		21 July 1987 (aged 24)	1.77 m (5 ft 9 1/2 in)
11	F	Kew Suik May		30 September 1982 (aged 28)	1.72 m (5 ft 7 1/2 in)
12	C	Kalaimathi Rajintiran		2 September 1990 (aged 20)	1.85 m (6 ft 1 in)
13	G	Goh Beng Fong		5 October 1982 (aged 28)	1.65 m (5 ft 5 in)
14	C	Hee Shook Ying		18 October 1985 (aged 25)	1.81 m (5 ft 11 1/2 in)
15	C	Yap Ching Yee		16 December 1991 (aged 19)	1.92 m (6 ft 3 1/2 in)

=== Singapore ===
Head coach: Chiew Poh Leng

#	Pos	Name	Club	Date of birth	Height
5	F	Juliana Ang		30 May 1987 (aged 24)	1.68 m (5 ft 6 in)
6	G	Lim Jia Min		8 August 1991 (aged 20)	1.67 m (5 ft 5 1/2 in)
7	G	Cynthia Sunarko		19 May 1989 (aged 22)	1.63 m (5 ft 4 in)
8	F	Jayne Tan		28 August 1989 (aged 21)	1.73 m (5 ft 8 in)
9	F	Lim Shi Hui		16 February 1989 (aged 22)	1.73 m (5 ft 8 in)
10	F	Alanna Lim		10 November 1991 (aged 19)	1.73 m (5 ft 8 in)
11	F	Koh Wei Bin		12 January 1986 (aged 25)	1.65 m (5 ft 5 in)
13	G	Janice Tan		2 February 1993 (aged 18)	1.68 m (5 ft 6 in)
14	F	Celine Sim		28 August 1989 (aged 21)	1.75 m (5 ft 9 in)
15	F	Tang Choy Ting		18 July 1993 (aged 18)	1.73 m (5 ft 8 in)

=== Sri Lanka ===
Head coach: Ajit Kuruppu

#	Pos	Name	Club	Date of birth	Height
4		Premila Fernando		22 March 1981 (aged 30)	1.59 m (5 ft 2 1/2 in)
5		Prasadi Fonseka		22 December 1989 (aged 21)	1.60 m (5 ft 3 in)
6		Shanali Weerasuriya		8 January 1989 (aged 22)	1.54 m (5 ft 1/2 in)
7		Erandi Gallage		14 May 1986 (aged 25)	1.68 m (5 ft 6 in)
8		Inoka Sandamali		20 March 1982 (aged 29)	1.60 m (5 ft 3 in)
9		Solange Gunawijaya		11 May 1991 (aged 20)	1.70 m (5 ft 7 in)
10		Sulochana Iddamalgoda		22 March 1989 (aged 22)	1.50 m (4 ft 11 in)
11		Anjali Ekanayake		14 February 1989 (aged 22)	1.62 m (5 ft 4 in)
12		Benika Thalagala		7 August 1987 (aged 24)	1.68 m (5 ft 6 in)
13		Jayali Kumari		1 February 1983 (aged 28)	1.63 m (5 ft 4 in)
14	C	Kumarine Silva		15 May 1981 (aged 30)	1.72 m (5 ft 7 1/2 in)
15	F	Sanduni Perera		14 February 1993 (aged 18)	1.60 m (5 ft 3 in)

=== Uzbekistan ===
Head coach: Stepan Lebedev

#	Pos	Name	Club	Date of birth	Height
4	G	Natalya Koneva		2 June 1989 (aged 22)	1.70 m (5 ft 7 in)
5	G	Nigorakhon Ismailova		1 June 1985 (aged 26)	1.72 m (5 ft 7 1/2 in)
6	G	Marina Zakharova		22 July 1986 (aged 25)	1.70 m (5 ft 7 in)
7	F	Guzal Burieva		18 February 1989 (aged 22)	1.80 m (5 ft 11 in)
8	F	Ekaterina Obechkina		8 June 1985 (aged 26)	1.82 m (5 ft 11 1/2 in)
9	F	Yelena Khusnitdinova	(Belarus) Nika NMMC Minsk	3 May 1985 (aged 26)	1.78 m (5 ft 10 in)
10	C	Anastasiya Mikulenko		25 September 1988 (aged 22)	1.93 m (6 ft 4 in)
11	G	Irina Polunina	(Kazakhstan) Okzhetpes	3 August 1979 (aged 32)	1.76 m (5 ft 9 1/2 in)
12	F	Irina Averyanova	(Kazakhstan) Barsy Atyrau	14 March 1984 (aged 27)	1.85 m (6 ft 1 in)
13	F	Kamilla Sabirjanova		3 December 1992 (aged 18)	1.80 m (5 ft 11 in)
14	C	Lyudmila Komarova		5 November 1993 (aged 17)	1.90 m (6 ft 3 in)
15	G	Yuliya Kashuba	(Kazakhstan) Okzhetpes	2 December 1987 (aged 23)	1.74 m (5 ft 8 1/2 in)
