= Basketball at the 2010 Asian Games – Women's tournament =

Women at the 2010 Asian Games
- Venue: Huangpu Gymnasium; Guangzhou International Sports Arena; Ying Tung Gymnasium
- Date: 18–25 November 2010
- Competitors: 84 from 7 nations

Medalists
| gold medal | China |
| silver medal | South Korea |
| bronze medal | Japan |

Women's basketball at the 2010 Asian Games was held in Guangzhou from 18 November to 25 November 2010.

== Squads ==
| China | Chinese Taipei | India | Japan |
|---|---|---|---|
| Zhang Hanlan; Bian Lan; Ding Yuan; Zhang Wei; Miao Lijie; Guan Xin; Zhang Fan; Ma Zengyu; Chen Xiaoli; Gao Song; Liu Dan; Chen Nan | Wu Shin-ying; Chang Shih-chieh; Chiang Feng-chun; Chang Hsiao-yu; Lin Chi-wen; Hsu Chien-hui; Tsai Pei-chen; Ma Yi-hung; Wen Chi; Liu Yi-chun; Peng Szu-chin; Liu Chun-yi | Akanksha Singh; Bharti Netam; Geethu Anna Jose; Anitha Pauldurai; Pratima Singh; Harjeet Kaur; Raspreet Sidhu; Sneha Rajguru; Pushpa Maddu; Raja Priyadharshini; Prashanti Singh; Smruthi Radhakrishnan | Yoko Nagi; Maki Takada; Yuka Mamiya; Ai Mitani; Ayumi Suzuki; Hiromi Suwa; Saori Fujiyoshi; Yoshie Sakurada; Asami Yoshida; Yuko Oga; Reika Takahashi; Sachiko Ishikawa |
| Maldives | South Korea | Thailand | |
| Aminath Shiura; Aishath Reema; Husna Mohamed; Fadhuwa Zahir; Fathimath Rizna; Aishath Risma; Zulaikha Ibrahim; Aminath Shaina; Shamama Ahmed; Aminath Samha; Hauma Ubaidulla; Fathimath Rishma | Kim Bo-mi; Kim Ji-yoon; Jung Sun-hwa; Lee Mi-sun; Lee Kyung-eun; Kang A-jeong; Beon Yeon-ha; Park Jung-eun; Ha Eun-joo; Kim Dan-bi; Kim Kwe-ryong; Sin Jung-ja | Wipaporn Saechua; Phichayavee Panurushthanon; Ruemonchanok Doksaiyud; Juthamas Jantakan; Charothai Suksomwong; Atchara Kaichaiyapoom; Juthathip Mathuros; Chonticha Chirdpetcharat; Chonlada Eiamsum-ang; Penphan Yothanan; Nipa Sangkhum; Naruemol Banmoo | |

== Results ==
All times are China Standard Time (UTC+08:00)

=== Preliminary round ===
==== Group A ====
| Pos | Team | Pld | W | L | PF | PA | PD | Pts | Qualification |
|---|---|---|---|---|---|---|---|---|---|
| 1 | China | 3 | 3 | 0 | 277 | 146 | +131 | 6 | Semifinals |
| 2 | South Korea | 3 | 2 | 1 | 255 | 171 | +84 | 5 | Semifinals |
| 3 | Thailand | 3 | 1 | 2 | 160 | 245 | −85 | 4 | Placings 5th–6th |
| 4 | India | 3 | 0 | 3 | 137 | 267 | −130 | 3 | |

Source: Results

18 November
19:15

| China | 107–39 | India |
Scoring by quarter: 29–8, 27–13, 28–15, 23–3
| Pts: Guan 16; Rebs: Chen N. 9 Asts: Zhang H. 5 | | Pts: Jose 12; Rebs: Jose, Prat. Singh 5 Asts: A. Singh, Pauldurai, Sidhu 1 |

Huangpu Gymnasium, Guangzhou
Referees: Elena Chernova (RUS), Yoko Tomita (JPN), Amir Hossein Safarzadeh (IRI)

18 November
19:15

| South Korea | 93–55 | Thailand |
Scoring by quarter: 31–10, 15–13, 26–16, 21–16
| Pts: Beon 21; Rebs: Jung, Lee M., Park 5 Asts: Kim J., Lee M., Kim K. 4 | | Pts: Kaichaiyapoom 11; Rebs: Kaichaiyapoom 5 Asts: Saechua 2 |

Ying Tung Gymnasium, Guangzhou
Referees: Nadine Crowley (CAN), Tien Hsiao-lun (TPE), Naohiko Uchihara (JPN)

20 November
19:15

| Thailand | 43–98 | China |
Scoring by quarter: 9–29, 18–27, 10–22, 6–20
| Pts: Suksomwong 16; Rebs: Saechua, Mathuros, Sangkhum 3 Asts: four players 2 | | Pts: Miao, Liu 12; Rebs: four players 5 Asts: Zhang F. 3 |

Huangpu Gymnasium, Guangzhou
Referees: Nadine Crowley (CAN), Pak Jong-sik (PRK), Fong Kin Lung (HKG)

20 November
19:15

| India | 44–98 | South Korea |
Scoring by quarter: 11–25, 12–17, 8–23, 13–33
| Pts: Jose, Pauldurai 13; Rebs: Jose 11; Asts: Jose 2 | | Pts: Kim D. 21; Rebs: Kim K., Sin 7 Asts: Beon 9 |

Ying Tung Gymnasium, Guangzhou
Referees: Yoko Tomita (JPN), Liu Wei (CHN), Tien Hsiao-lun (TPE)

22 November
14:15

| China | 72–64 | South Korea |
Scoring by quarter: 21–20, 20–15, 19–17, 12–12
| Pts: Chen N. 29; Rebs: Guan 13; Asts: Miao 5 | | Pts: Kim D. 17; Rebs: Jung 4 Asts: four players 1 |

Huangpu Gymnasium, Guangzhou
Referees: Elena Chernova (RUS), Yoko Tomita (JPN), Yasser Abbas (QAT)

22 November
14:15

| India | 54–62 | Thailand |
Scoring by quarter: 17–14, 3–22, 27–12, 7–14
| Pts: Jose 20; Rebs: Jose 12; Asts: Jose 4 | | Pts: Kaichaiyapoom 13; Rebs: Kaichaiyapoom, Mathuros 7 Asts: Yothanan 3 |

Ying Tung Gymnasium, Guangzhou
Referees: Nadine Crowley (CAN), Andy Cheung (HKG), Peng Ling (CHN)

==== Group B ====
| Pos | Team | Pld | W | L | PF | PA | PD | Pts | Qualification |
|---|---|---|---|---|---|---|---|---|---|
| 1 | Japan | 2 | 2 | 0 | 212 | 78 | +134 | 4 | Semifinals |
| 2 | Chinese Taipei | 2 | 1 | 1 | 186 | 92 | +94 | 3 | Semifinals |
| 3 | Maldives | 2 | 0 | 2 | 42 | 270 | −228 | 2 | Placings 5th–6th |

Source: Results

18 November
19:15

| Chinese Taipei | 127–23 | Maldives |
Scoring by quarter: 37–3, 34–7, 35–9, 21–4
| Pts: Peng 20; Rebs: Tsai 14; Asts: Chiang 10 | | Pts: Shiura 8 Rebs: Shiura 7 Asts: Shaina 1 |

International Sports Arena, Guangzhou
Referees: Liu Wei (CHN), Ramesh Kumar (IND), Pak Jong-sik (PRK)

20 November
19:15

| Japan | 69–59 | Chinese Taipei |
Scoring by quarter: 23–19, 15–12, 17–20, 14–8
| Pts: Oga 15; Rebs: Yoshida 7 Asts: Oga 6 | | Pts: Chiang 16; Rebs: Chiang 12; Asts: Tsai 4 |

International Sports Arena, Guangzhou
Referees: Elena Chernova (RUS), Peng Ling (CHN), Mohammad Al-Amiri (KUW)

22 November
14:15

| Maldives | 19–143 | Japan |
Scoring by quarter: 4–33, 4–37, 7–37, 4–36
| Pts: Shiura 8 Rebs: Shiura 7 Asts: 0 | | Pts: Mamiya 21; Rebs: Nagi, Takada, Suwa 5 Asts: Yoshida 10 |

International Sports Arena, Guangzhou
Referees: Liu Wei (CHN), Tien Hsiao-lun (TPE), Kim Young-woo (KOR)

=== Placings 5th–6th ===
24 November
14:15

| Thailand | 93–47 | Maldives |
Scoring by quarter: 23–11, 25–12, 19–12, 26–12
| Pts: Jantakan 20; Rebs: Kaichaiyapoom, Banmoo 9 Asts: Saechua 6 | | Pts: Shiura 15; Rebs: Zahir 7 Asts: five players 1 |

International Sports Arena, Guangzhou
Referees: Peng Ling (CHN), Tien Hsiao-lun (TPE), Yoko Tomita (JPN)

=== Final round ===
Semifinals
24 November
Japan | 78
South Korea | 93
24 November
China | 84
Chinese Taipei | 58

Gold medal game
25 November
South Korea | 64
China | 70
Bronze medal game
25 November
Japan | 73
Chinese Taipei | 61

==== Semifinals ====
24 November
19:15

| Japan | 78–93 | South Korea |
Scoring by quarter: 22–24, 12–17, 27–30, 17–22
| Pts: Oga 26; Rebs: Mamiya 7 Asts: Yoshida 4 | | Pts: Beon 24; Rebs: Jung, Lee M., Kim D. 7 Asts: Park 6 |

International Sports Arena, Guangzhou
Referees: Elena Chernova (RUS), Amir Hossein Safarzadeh (IRI), Ferdinand Pascual (PHI)

24 November
21:30

| China | 84–58 | Chinese Taipei |
Scoring by quarter: 16–14, 22–5, 26–15, 20–24
| Pts: Zhang W. 25; Rebs: Chen N. 13; Asts: Ding 5 | | Pts: Peng 13; Rebs: Tsai 4 Asts: Chiang, Wen 2 |

International Sports Arena, Guangzhou
Referees: Nadine Crowley (CAN), Lau Cheuk Fai (HKG), Prakash Sandou (IND)

==== Bronze medal game ====
25 November
19:15

| Japan | 73–61 | Chinese Taipei |
Scoring by quarter: 20–10, 10–12, 25–21, 18–18
| Pts: Nagi 26; Rebs: Yoshida 13; Asts: Yoshida 6 | | Pts: Wen, Liu C. 21; Rebs: Liu C. 7 Asts: Liu C. 3 |

International Sports Arena, Guangzhou
Referees: Nadine Crowley (CAN), Andy Cheung (HKG), Yun Jong-hyun (KOR)

==== Gold medal game ====
25 November
21:30

| South Korea | 64–70 | China |
Scoring by quarter: 16–15, 12–24, 19–12, 17–19
| Pts: Beon 23; Rebs: Ha 5 Asts: Lee M. 6 | | Pts: Chen N. 17; Rebs: Chen N. 12; Asts: Miao 6 |

International Sports Arena, Guangzhou
Referees: Elena Chernova (RUS), Teerapong Yodsint (THA), Ramesh Kumar (IND)

== Final standing ==
| Rank | Team | Pld | W | L |
|---|---|---|---|---|
| 1st place, gold medalist(s) | China | 5 | 5 | 0 |
| 2nd place, silver medalist(s) | South Korea | 5 | 3 | 2 |
| 3rd place, bronze medalist(s) | Japan | 4 | 3 | 1 |
| 4 | Chinese Taipei | 4 | 1 | 3 |
| 5 | Thailand | 4 | 2 | 2 |
| 6 | Maldives | 3 | 0 | 3 |
| 7 | India | 3 | 0 | 3 |
