= 2007 FIBA Asia Championship for Women =

2007 FIBA Women's Asia Cup
22nd Asian Women's Basketball Championship
- Official logo of the 2007 FIBA Asia Championship for Women

Tournament details
- Host country: South Korea
- Dates: June 3–10
- Teams: 12 (from 44 federations)
- Venue: 1 (in 1 host city)

Final positions
- Champions: South Korea (12th title)

Tournament statistics
- Top scorer: (India) Jose (32.8)
- Top rebounds: (India) Jose (14.8)
- Top assists: (South Korea) Jung S.M. (4.0)
- PPG (Team): India (94.7)
- RPG (Team): India (54.3)
- APG (Team): South Korea (12.3)

Official website
- 2007 FIBA Asia Championship for Women

The 2007 FIBA Asia Championship for Women was the qualifying tournament for FIBA Asia at the women's basketball tournament at the 2008 Summer Olympics at Beijing. The tournament was held on Incheon, South Korea from June 3 to June 10.

The championship was divided into two levels: Level I and Level II. The two lowest finishers of Level I met the top two finishers of Level II to determine which teams qualified for Level I at the 2009 championship. The losers were relegated to (or remained in) Level II.

== Participating teams ==
Level I	Level II
China; South Korea; Chinese Taipei; Japan; Thailand; Malaysia	Hong Kong; India; Singapore; Sri Lanka; Uzbekistan; Vietnam

== Preliminary round ==
=== Level I ===
Team	Pld	W	L	PF	PA	PD	Pts
South Korea	5	5	0	452	313	+139	10
Japan	5	4	1	428	291	+137	9
China	5	3	2	461	325	+136	8
Chinese Taipei	5	2	3	410	351	+59	7
Thailand	5	1	4	277	513	−236	6
Malaysia	5	0	5	270	505	−235	5

June 3
16:00

Report

South Korea	108–47	Thailand
Scoring by quarter: 32–7, 21–12, 28–10, 27–18
Pts: Jung S.M. 18; Rebs: Sin J.J. 11; Asts: Jung S.M. 5		Pts: Charoenrat 15; Rebs: Sangkhum 6 Asts: Saechua, Sangkhum 2

Samsan World Gymnasium, Incheon

June 3
18:00

Report

Japan	72–67	China
Scoring by quarter: 20–22, 19–17, 17–14, 16–14
Pts: Yamada 20; Rebs: Oga 8 Asts: Oga 4		Pts: Guan X. 16; Rebs: Zhang F. 10; Asts: Jia G. 3

Samsan World Gymnasium, Incheon

June 3
20:00

Report

Malaysia	54–107	Chinese Taipei
Scoring by quarter: 13–29, 14–27, 14–29, 13–22
Pts: Teo W.Y., Chan Y.C. 10; Rebs: Kew S.M. 6 Asts: Goh B.F., Low B.C., Kew S.M. 1		Pts: Liu C.Y. 27; Rebs: Chien W.C., Cheng H.Y. 6 Asts: Chien W.C. 3

Samsan World Gymnasium, Incheon

June 4
16:00

Report

Chinese Taipei	65–74	South Korea
Scoring by quarter: 19–16, 16–21, 13–21, 17–16
Pts: Liu C.Y. 18; Rebs: Chiang F.C. 7 Asts: Four players 1		Pts: Beon Y.H. 20; Rebs: Jung S.M. 8 Asts: Jung S.M. 9

Samsan World Gymnasium, Incheon

June 4
18:00

Report

Thailand	44–104	Japan
Scoring by quarter: 9–26, 10–32, 11–23, 14–23
Pts: Charoenrat 16; Rebs: Pungkoksoong 7 Asts: Tunsaw 2		Pts: Watanabe, Iwamura 15; Rebs: Yashiro 9 Asts: Yoshida 4

Samsan World Gymnasium, Incheon

June 4
20:00

Report

China	109–57	Malaysia
Scoring by quarter: 26–12, 30–16, 29–16, 24–13
Pts: Zhang H.L. 18; Rebs: Wang X.L. 10; Asts: Guan X. 4		Pts: Kew S.M. 22; Rebs: Beh S.L., Lee S.Y. 6 Asts: Low B.C., Thoh C.L., Kew S.M. 1

Samsan World Gymnasium, Incheon

June 5
16:00

Report

South Korea	97–53	Malaysia
Scoring by quarter: 20–15, 28–12, 22–14, 27–12
Pts: Kim J.E. 29; Rebs: Sin J.J. 10; Asts: Kim J.H. 3		Pts: Chow S.F. 14; Rebs: Low B.C. 9 Asts: Four players 1

Samsan World Gymnasium, Incheon

June 5
18:00

Report

Japan	67–58	Chinese Taipei
Scoring by quarter: 22–11, 10–16, 19–9, 16–22
Pts: Oga 20; Rebs: Mitani 10; Asts: Mitani, Sakakibara 3		Pts: Wen C. 14; Rebs: Chiang F.C., Ma Y.H., Tsai P.C. 5 Asts: Cheng H.Y. 2

Samsan World Gymnasium, Incheon

June 5
20:00

Report

China	113–47	Thailand
Scoring by quarter: 31–10, 30–9, 26–17, 26–11
Pts: Wei W. 21; Rebs: Zhang D. 11; Asts: Ma Z.Y. 4		Pts: Charoenrat, Pungkoksoong, Banmoo 10; Rebs: Pungkoksoong 12; Asts: Four players 1

Samsan World Gymnasium, Incheon

June 6
16:00

Report

Japan	68–90	South Korea
Scoring by quarter: 14–20, 14–19, 17–20, 23–31
Pts: Utsumi 13; Rebs: Mitani 7 Asts: Oga 4		Pts: Jung S.M. 20; Rebs: Kim K.R. 7 Asts: Jung S.M., Beon Y.H. 4

Samsan World Gymnasium, Incheon

June 6
18:00

Report

Malaysia	74–75	Thailand
Scoring by quarter: 9–21, 19–16, 25–17, 21–21
Pts: Chow S.F. 25; Rebs: Chow S.F. 6 Asts: Low B.C., Yong S.M. 1		Pts: Charoenrat, Pungkoksoong 21; Rebs: Pungkoksoong 20; Asts: Charoenrat 2

Samsan World Gymnasium, Incheon

June 6
20:00

Report

Chinese Taipei	66–92	China
Scoring by quarter: 15–16, 10–25, 18–26, 23–25
Pts: Wen C. 16; Rebs: Chiang F.C. 6 Asts: Five players 1		Pts: Guan X. 18; Rebs: Guan X. 10; Asts: Jia G., Zhang H.L. 2

Samsan World Gymnasium, Incheon

June 7
14:00

Report

South Korea	83–80	China
Scoring by quarter: 29–21, 17–15, 13–18, 24–26
Pts: Jung S.M. 27; Rebs: Jung S.M. 10; Asts: Jung S.M. 5		Pts: Zhang H.L. 23; Rebs: Zhang H.L. 8 Asts: Zhang H.L. 2

Samsan World Gymnasium, Incheon

June 7
16:00

Report

Thailand	64–114	Chinese Taipei
Scoring by quarter: 12–35, 24–20, 14–31, 14–28
Pts: Tunsaw, Banmoo 11; Rebs: Pungkoksoong 8 Asts: Pungkoksoong 2		Pts: Wen C., Lin H.M. 23; Rebs: Tsai P.C. 7 Asts: Five players 2

Samsan World Gymnasium, Incheon

June 7
18:00

Report

Malaysia	32–117	Japan
Scoring by quarter: 10–24, 2–30, 16–35, 4–28
Pts: Chan Y.C. 9 Rebs: Chan Y.C. 5 Asts: Four players 1		Pts: Iwamura 22; Rebs: Yamada, Ikeda 8 Asts: Oga 6

Samsan World Gymnasium, Incheon

=== Level II ===
Team	Pld	W	L	PF	PA	PD	Pts
India	5	5	0	482	274	+208	10
Hong Kong	5	4	1	374	314	+60	9
Uzbekistan	5	3	2	360	308	+52	8
Vietnam	5	2	3	320	401	−81	7
Singapore	5	1	4	290	384	−94	6
Sri Lanka	5	0	5	277	422	−145	5

June 3
10:00

Report

Uzbekistan	56–75	Hong Kong
Scoring by quarter: 12–18, 12–16, 17–21, 15–20
Pts: Sevastyanova 14; Rebs: Kildyusheva 12; Asts: Titova 2		Pts: Cho K.Y. 23; Rebs: Lam Y. 8 Asts: Four players 1

Samsan World Gymnasium, Incheon

June 3
12:00

Report

India	111–32	Singapore
Scoring by quarter: 32–12, 21–5, 25–6, 33–9
Pts: Jose 33; Rebs: Jose 14; Asts: D. Singh 3		Pts: Zhou L. 14; Rebs: Koh W.B., Ja. Ang 5 Asts: Neo, Lee 1

Samsan World Gymnasium, Incheon

June 3
14:00

Report

Sri Lanka	52–75	Vietnam
Scoring by quarter: 21–15, 9–17, 18–15, 4–28
Pts: Fernando 23; Rebs: Gallage 12; Asts: Fernando 2		Pts: Nguyen T.L.V. 19; Rebs: Nguyen T.L.V. 12; Asts: Le T.V.A. 4

Samsan World Gymnasium, Incheon

June 4
10:00

Report

Vietnam	62–111	India
Scoring by quarter: 20–19, 4–37, 14–27, 24–28
Pts: Nguyen T.N.H. 14; Rebs: Nguyen T.L.V. 8 Asts: Cho T.Q.H., Nguyen T.N.H. 3		Pts: Jose 34; Rebs: Jose 21; Asts: Pauldurai 3

Samsan World Gymnasium, Incheon

June 4
12:00

Report

Hong Kong	91–51	Sri Lanka
Scoring by quarter: 22–10, 32–8, 18–14, 19–19
Pts: Koon K.H. 19; Rebs: Lo H.F., Tsin Y.F. 5 Asts: Yau K.W. 5		Pts: Silva 14; Rebs: Gallage 11; Asts: Peiris 2

Samsan World Gymnasium, Incheon

June 4
14:00

Report

Singapore	57–71	Uzbekistan
Scoring by quarter: 14–23, 11–20, 11–15, 21–13
Pts: Tan Y.N., Zhou L. 12; Rebs: Zhou L. 8 Asts: Zhou L., Koh W.B. 2		Pts: Averyanova 18; Rebs: Kildyusheva 13; Asts: Titova 5

Samsan World Gymnasium, Incheon

June 5
10:00

Report

Sri Lanka	59–70	Singapore
Scoring by quarter: 16–15, 18–13, 10–23, 15–19
Pts: Fernando 25; Rebs: Silva 14; Asts: Fernando 2		Pts: Zhou L. 24; Rebs: Zhou L. 12; Asts: Poon, Zhou L. 2

Samsan World Gymnasium, Incheon

June 5
12:00

Report

Uzbekistan	63–67	India
Scoring by quarter: 13–19, 20–9, 10–20, 20–19
Pts: Titova 20; Rebs: Krasovskaya 12; Asts: Kashuba, Titova 2		Pts: Jose 27; Rebs: Jose 20; Asts: Jose 2

Samsan World Gymnasium, Incheon

June 5
14:00

Report

Vietnam	59–78	Hong Kong
Scoring by quarter: 11–18, 17–24, 15–16, 16–20
Pts: Nguyen T.N.H. 20; Rebs: Nguyen T.N.H. 10; Asts: Le T.V.A., Nguyen T.H. 2		Pts: Koon K.H. 24; Rebs: Lam Y. 7 Asts: Yau K.W. 3

Samsan World Gymnasium, Incheon

June 6
10:00

Report

India	88–61	Hong Kong
Scoring by quarter: 26–12, 23–17, 22–13, 17–19
Pts: Jose 27; Rebs: Jose 14; Asts: Pauldurai 3		Pts: Cheung Y.S. 19; Rebs: Liu, Tsin Y.F. 7 Asts: Cheung Y.S., Liu 1

Samsan World Gymnasium, Incheon

June 6
12:00

Report

Singapore	71–74	Vietnam
Scoring by quarter: 20–21, 14–12, 21–20, 16–21
Pts: Poon 17; Rebs: Ja. Ang 8 Asts: Koh W.B. 3		Pts: Nguyen T.H. 15; Rebs: Nguyen T.N.H. 10; Asts: Nguyen T.N.H. 2

Samsan World Gymnasium, Incheon

June 6
14:00

Report

Sri Lanka	59–81	Uzbekistan
Scoring by quarter: 14–25, 15–19, 10–18, 20–19
Pts: Silva 20; Rebs: Silva 14; Asts: Fernando 4		Pts: Khusnitdinova 15; Rebs: Kildyusheva 11; Asts: Khusnitdinova 4

Samsan World Gymnasium, Incheon

June 7
10:00

Report

Uzbekistan	89–50	Vietnam
Scoring by quarter: 12–15, 25–8, 36–9, 16–18
Pts: Burieva 22; Rebs: Krasovskaya 16; Asts: Burieva 6		Pts: Nguyen T.L.V. 27; Rebs: Four players 6 Asts: Le T.V.A. 2

Samsan World Gymnasium, Incheon

June 7
12:00

Report

India	105–56	Sri Lanka
Scoring by quarter: 33–8, 26–25, 23–12, 23–11
Pts: Jose 29; Rebs: S. Singh 10; Asts: D. Singh 5		Pts: Fernando 28; Rebs: Silva 12; Asts: Fernando 5

Samsan World Gymnasium, Incheon

June 7
20:00

Report

Hong Kong	69–60	Singapore
Scoring by quarter: 21–23, 13–8, 13–10, 22–19
Pts: Cho K.Y. 21; Rebs: Lo H.F. 16; Asts: Cheung Y.S., Cho K.Y. 3		Pts: Zhou L. 14; Rebs: Zhou L. 13; Asts: Zhou L. 5

Samsan World Gymnasium, Incheon

== Qualifying round ==
Winners are promoted to Level I for the 2009 championships.

June 9
12:00

Report

Thailand	71–41	Hong Kong
Scoring by quarter: 26–18, 13–6, 13–5, 19–12
Pts: Banmoo 16; Rebs: Chirdpetcharat 11; Asts: Charoenrat, Pungkoksoong 2		Pts: Yau K.W. 11; Rebs: Lo H.F. 6 Asts: Cheung Y.S. 2

Samsan World Gymnasium, Incheon

June 9
14:00

Report

Malaysia	68–86	India
Scoring by quarter: 18–25, 20–24, 15–24, 15–13
Pts: Goh B.F. 15; Rebs: Low B.C. 9 Asts: Teo W.Y., Chow S.F. 1		Pts: Jose 47; Rebs: Jose 12; Asts: Channegowda 7

Samsan World Gymnasium, Incheon

== Final round ==
Semifinals
June 9
South Korea	80
Chinese Taipei	70
June 9
Japan	62
China	74

Final
June 10
South Korea	79
China	73
3rd place
June 10
Chinese Taipei	70
Japan	73

=== Semifinals ===
June 9
16:00

Report

South Korea	80–70	Chinese Taipei
Scoring by quarter: 26–20, 15–19, 22–13, 17–18
Pts: Beon Y.H. 19; Rebs: Park J.E. 10; Asts: Beon Y.H. 3		Pts: Chiang F.C. 20; Rebs: Cheng H.Y. 6 Asts: Chien W.C. 2

Samsan World Gymnasium, Incheon

June 9
18:00

Report

Japan	62–74	China
Scoring by quarter: 13–16, 9–15, 14–28, 26–15
Pts: Utsumi 20; Rebs: Mitani, Oga 6 Asts: Yashiro, Oga 2		Pts: Ma Z.Y. 21; Rebs: Zhang F. 8 Asts: Jia G. 3

Samsan World Gymnasium, Incheon

=== 3rd place ===
June 10
16:00

Report

Chinese Taipei	70–73	Japan
Scoring by quarter: 13–22, 17–18, 17–16, 23–17
Pts: Chiang F.C. 21; Rebs: Chiang F.C. 6 Asts: Chien W.C., Cheng H.Y. 2		Pts: Oga 17; Rebs: Yashiro 9 Asts: Oga 8

Samsan World Gymnasium, Incheon

=== Final ===
June 10
18:00

Report

South Korea	79–73	China
Scoring by quarter: 20–18, 22–15, 20–17, 17–23
Pts: Jung S.M. 18; Rebs: Jung S.M., Kim K.R. 8 Asts: Beon Y.H. 6		Pts: Ma Z.Y. 19; Rebs: Zhang H.L. 8 Asts: Zhang H.L. 5

Samsan World Gymnasium, Incheon

== Final standing ==
Qualified for the 2008 Summer Olympics
Qualified for the Olympic Qualifying Tournament

Rank	Team	Record
1st place, gold medalist(s)	South Korea	7–0
2nd place, silver medalist(s)	China	4–3
3rd place, bronze medalist(s)	Japan	5–2
4	Chinese Taipei	2–5
5	Thailand	2–4
6	Malaysia	0–6
7	India	6–0
8	Hong Kong	4–2
9	Uzbekistan	3–2
10	Vietnam	2–3
11	Singapore	1–4
12	Sri Lanka	0–5

== Awards ==
2007 Asian champions

South Korea
Twelfth title
