= 2009 FIBA Asia Championship for Women =

2009 FIBA Women's Asia Cup
23rd Asian Women's Basketball Championship

Tournament details
- Host country: India
- Dates: 17–24 September
- Teams: 12 (from 44 federations)
- Venue: 1 (in 1 host city)

Final positions
- Champions: China (10th title)

Tournament statistics
- MVP: (China) Bian Lan
- Top scorer: (India) Jose (22.0)
- Top rebounds: (Lebanon) El Charif (10.5)
- Top assists: (South Korea) Lee M.S. (4.6)
- PPG (Team): South Korea (91.4)
- RPG (Team): Kazakhstan (50.0)
- APG (Team): China (20.1)

Official website
- 2009 FIBA Asia Championship for Women

The 2009 FIBA Asia Championship for Women is the qualifying tournament for FIBA Asia at the World Championship 2010 at Czech Republic. The tournament will be held on Chennai, India from 17 to 24 September.

The championship is divided into two levels: Level I and Level II. The two lowest finishers of Level I meets the top two finishers to determine which teams qualify for Level for 2011's championship. The losers are relegated to Level II.

== Participating teams ==
Level I	Level II
South Korea; China; Japan; Chinese Taipei; Thailand; India	Kazakhstan; Lebanon; Malaysia; Philippines; Sri Lanka; Uzbekistan

== Preliminary round ==
=== Level I ===
Team	Pld	W	L	PF	PA	PD	Pts
China	5	5	0	454	284	+170	10
South Korea	5	4	1	468	289	+179	9
Japan	5	3	2	401	340	+61	8
Chinese Taipei	5	2	3	334	378	−44	7
Thailand	5	1	4	300	468	−168	6
India	5	0	5	281	479	−198	5

17 September
16:00

Report

India	46–102	South Korea
Scoring by quarter: 7–27, 14–29, 12–28, 13–18
Pts: Jose 15; Rebs: K. Kaur 9 Asts: Four players 1		Pts: Beon Y.H. 26; Rebs: Jung S.M. 14; Asts: Lee M.S. 7

Jawaharlal Nehru Indoor Stadium, Chennai

17 September
18:00

Report

Thailand	51–115	China
Scoring by quarter: 15–34, 10–21, 9–33, 17–27
Pts: Jantakan 20; Rebs: Banmoo 5 Asts: Chuinim, Jantakan 2		Pts: Huang H.P. 18; Rebs: Guan X. 8 Asts: Guan X. 4

Jawaharlal Nehru Indoor Stadium, Chennai

17 September
20:00

Report

Japan	73–65	Chinese Taipei
Scoring by quarter: 18–17, 19–20, 19–15, 17–13
Pts: Oga 24; Rebs: Mitani 8 Asts: Yoshida 6		Pts: Li W.T., Liu C.Y. 12; Rebs: Cheng H.Y., Liu C.Y. 4 Asts: Cheng H.Y. 4

Jawaharlal Nehru Indoor Stadium, Chennai

18 September
15:00

Report

China	75–58	Japan
Scoring by quarter: 14–13, 19–19, 23–14, 19–12
Pts: Chen N. 18; Rebs: Chen N. 8 Asts: Bian L., Ma Z.Y. 3		Pts: Koiso 17; Rebs: Yoshida 11; Asts: Four players 2

Jawaharlal Nehru Indoor Stadium, Chennai

18 September
17:00

Report

Chinese Taipei	84–61	India
Scoring by quarter: 16–16, 30–18, 20–17, 18–10
Pts: Chang S.C., Lan J.Y. 15; Rebs: Li W.T. 4 Asts: Huang F.S. 8		Pts: Jose 34; Rebs: Jose 11; Asts: Pt. Singh, Maggon 3

Jawaharlal Nehru Indoor Stadium, Chennai

18 September
19:00

Report

South Korea	116–45	Thailand
Scoring by quarter: 26–12, 35–10, 30–10, 25–13
Pts: Kim K.R. 19; Rebs: Four players 6 Asts: Lee M.S. 10		Pts: Suksomwong 12; Rebs: Banmoo 5 Asts: Saechua, Mathuros 2

Jawaharlal Nehru Indoor Stadium, Chennai

19 September
15:00

Report

Japan	94–60	Thailand
Scoring by quarter: 21–9, 22–14, 25–18, 26–19
Pts: Sakurada 17; Rebs: Mitani 9 Asts: Obata 7		Pts: Banmoo 19; Rebs: Jantakan 6 Asts: Saechua, Mathuros 3

Jawaharlal Nehru Indoor Stadium, Chennai

19 September
17:00

Report

India	49–107	China
Scoring by quarter: 13–29, 8–29, 13–22, 15–27
Pts: Pauldurai 14; Rebs: Jose 9 Asts: Ps. Singh 3		Pts: Ma Z.Y. 17; Rebs: Guan X. 10; Asts: Yang B.B. 6

Jawaharlal Nehru Indoor Stadium, Chennai

19 September
19:00

Report

Chinese Taipei	55–96	South Korea
Scoring by quarter: 7–31, 15–26, 13–25, 20–14
Pts: Lin C.W. 14; Rebs: Chu Y.H. 5 Asts: Li W.T., Lin H.M. 2		Pts: Park J.E. 17; Rebs: Jung S.M. 7 Asts: Jung S.M. 10

Jawaharlal Nehru Indoor Stadium, Chennai

21 September
15:00

Report

South Korea	82–68	Japan
Scoring by quarter: 14–23, 21–19, 26–8, 21–18
Pts: Park J.E. 17; Rebs: Kim K.R. 9 Asts: Beon Y.H. 5		Pts: Oga 16; Rebs: Yoshida 12; Asts: Yoshida, Oga 4

Jawaharlal Nehru Indoor Stadium, Chennai

21 September
17:00

Report

Thailand	78–67	India
Scoring by quarter: 22–19, 17–13, 17–17, 22–18
Pts: Jantakan 20; Rebs: Mathuros 9 Asts: Mathuros 4		Pts: Jose 23; Rebs: Jose 10; Asts: Jose, Ps. Singh 3

Jawaharlal Nehru Indoor Stadium, Chennai

21 September
19:00

Report

China	82–54	Chinese Taipei
Scoring by quarter: 15–17, 22–13, 23–11, 22–13
Pts: Ma Z.Y. 13; Rebs: Chen X.L., Chen N. 7 Asts: Ma Z.Y. 4		Pts: Lan J.Y. 22; Rebs: Lan J.Y. 3 Asts: Lin C.W. 3

Jawaharlal Nehru Indoor Stadium, Chennai

22 September
15:00

Report

Chinese Taipei	76–66	Thailand
Scoring by quarter: 23–18, 8–13, 29–21, 16–14
Pts: Liu C.Y. 16; Rebs: Liu C.Y. 7 Asts: Huang F.S. 8		Pts: Jantakan 22; Rebs: Yothanan, Mathuros 10; Asts: Intapan, Yothanan, Jantakan 2

Jawaharlal Nehru Indoor Stadium, Chennai

22 September
17:00

Report

India	58–108	Japan
Scoring by quarter: 20–21, 11–34, 13–29, 14–24
Pts: Jose 30; Rebs: Ps. Singh 5 Asts: Pauldurai 3		Pts: Sakurada 26; Rebs: Koiso 8 Asts: Obata 6

Jawaharlal Nehru Indoor Stadium, Chennai

22 September
19:00

Report

China	75–72	South Korea
Scoring by quarter: 20–20, 14–14, 21–23, 20–15
Pts: Chen X.L., Chen N. 17; Rebs: Chen N. 10; Asts: Bian L., Miao L.J. 5		Pts: Beon Y.H. 23; Rebs: Beon Y.H. 5 Asts: Beon Y.H., Jung S.M. 4

Jawaharlal Nehru Indoor Stadium, Chennai

=== Level II ===
Team	Pld	W	L	PF	PA	PD	Pts	Tiebreaker
Malaysia	5	4	1	369	309	+60	9	1–0
Lebanon	5	4	1	409	318	+91	9	0–1
Kazakhstan	5	3	2	355	316	+39	8	1–0
Philippines	5	3	2	318	332	−14	8	0–1
Uzbekistan	5	1	4	377	365	+12	6	
Sri Lanka	5	0	5	242	430	−188	5	

17 September
9:00

Report

Philippines	61–55	Malaysia
Scoring by quarter: 20–19, 13–11, 15–16, 13–9
Pts: Valencia 15; Rebs: Jose 6 Asts: Grajales 5		Pts: Kew S.M. 14; Rebs: Yong S.M. 6 Asts: Goh B.F., Yong S.M. 3

Jawaharlal Nehru Indoor Stadium, Chennai

17 September
11:00

Report

Lebanon	83–68	Uzbekistan
Scoring by quarter: 26–19, 15–21, 26–13, 16–15
Pts: Nasr 23; Rebs: Anderson 8 Asts: Nasr 4		Pts: Polunina 21; Rebs: Tatarinova, Krasovskaya 6 Asts: Khusnitdinova, Polunina 3

Jawaharlal Nehru Indoor Stadium, Chennai

17 September
13:00

Report

Sri Lanka	40–94	Kazakhstan
Scoring by quarter: 8–27, 14–24, 11–23, 7–20
Pts: Fernando 13; Rebs: Gallage, Sandamali 4 Asts: Gunawijaya 2		Pts: Dots 13; Rebs: Ivanova 10; Asts: Alishauskaite 4

Jawaharlal Nehru Indoor Stadium, Chennai

18 September
9:00

Report

Malaysia	84–69	Lebanon
Scoring by quarter: 22–26, 19–21, 14–11, 29–11
Pts: Goh B.F. 22; Rebs: Pee Y.Y., Kew S.M. 5 Asts: Pee Y.Y. 6		Pts: Nasr 18; Rebs: El Charif 11; Asts: Four players 1

Jawaharlal Nehru Indoor Stadium, Chennai

18 September
11:00

Report

Kazakhstan	71–52	Philippines
Scoring by quarter: 17–15, 15–6, 22–17, 17–14
Pts: Alishauskaite 18; Rebs: Ivanova, Sedova, Kuzmicheva 13; Asts: Alishauskaite 7		Pts: Arayi 26; Rebs: Lubiano 9 Asts: Six players 1

Jawaharlal Nehru Indoor Stadium, Chennai

18 September
13:00

Report

Uzbekistan	89–48	Sri Lanka
Scoring by quarter: 27–12, 25–16, 17–13, 20–7
Pts: Koniva 24; Rebs: Tatarinova 11; Asts: Polunina 5		Pts: Sandamali 15; Rebs: Silva 8 Asts: Thalagala 3

Jawaharlal Nehru Indoor Stadium, Chennai

19 September
9:00

Report

Kazakhstan	57–71	Malaysia
Scoring by quarter: 15–17, 8–15, 17–20, 17–19
Pts: Kuzmicheva 18; Rebs: Sedova 13; Asts: Volikova 3		Pts: Ang S.T. 20; Rebs: Yong S.M. 8 Asts: Pee Y.Y. 4

Jawaharlal Nehru Indoor Stadium, Chennai

19 September
11:00

Report

Sri Lanka	54–96	Lebanon
Scoring by quarter: 20–20, 11–29, 15–34, 8–13
Pts: Fernando 16; Rebs: Silva 9 Asts: Sandamali, Karunaratne, Silva 2		Pts: Anderson 22; Rebs: Anderson 9 Asts: Anderson 4

Jawaharlal Nehru Indoor Stadium, Chennai

19 September
13:00

Report

Philippines	81–73	Uzbekistan
Scoring by quarter: 16–15, 22–11, 17–33, 26–14
Pts: Grajales 22; Rebs: Grajales 6 Asts: Grajales 6		Pts: Khusnitdinova 15; Rebs: Dmitrieva, Krasovskaya 5 Asts: Polunina, Krasovskaya 3

Jawaharlal Nehru Indoor Stadium, Chennai

21 September
9:00

Report

Malaysia	81–45	Sri Lanka
Scoring by quarter: 14–16, 16–12, 23–7, 28–10
Pts: Ang S.T. 19; Rebs: Yaakob 6 Asts: Goh B.F., Yaakob 5		Pts: Fernando 15; Rebs: Bollegala 8 Asts: Bollegala, Silva 2

Jawaharlal Nehru Indoor Stadium, Chennai

21 September
11:00

Report

Uzbekistan	70–75	Kazakhstan
Scoring by quarter: 19–21, 15–22, 14–19, 22–13
Pts: Polunina, Krasovskaya 14; Rebs: Krasovskaya 7 Asts: Burieva 3		Pts: Kuzmicheva 20; Rebs: Protsenko 11; Asts: Protsenko 5

Jawaharlal Nehru Indoor Stadium, Chennai

21 September
13:00

Report

Lebanon	78–54	Philippines
Scoring by quarter: 18–13, 20–11, 22–11, 18–19
Pts: Alameddine, Nasr 16; Rebs: El Charif 16; Asts: Nasr 6		Pts: Borja 21; Rebs: Tioseco 9 Asts: Mercado 2

Jawaharlal Nehru Indoor Stadium, Chennai

22 September
9:00

Report

Uzbekistan	77–78	Malaysia
Scoring by quarter: 21–18, 13–22, 28–11, 15–27
Pts: Polunina 19; Rebs: Tatarinova 11; Asts: Khusnitdinova 4		Pts: Kew S.M. 18; Rebs: Kew S.M. 8 Asts: Yaakob 5

Jawaharlal Nehru Indoor Stadium, Chennai

22 September
11:00

Report

Philippines	70–55	Sri Lanka
Scoring by quarter: 15–20, 11–3, 24–10, 20–22
Pts: Arayi 23; Rebs: Tioseco 11; Asts: delos Reyes 2		Pts: Fernando, Sandamali 12; Rebs: Bollegala, Silva 9 Asts: Fonseka 3

Jawaharlal Nehru Indoor Stadium, Chennai

22 September
13:00

Report

Kazakhstan	58–83	Lebanon
Scoring by quarter: 12–25, 11–22, 17–22, 18–14
Pts: Kuzmicheva 15; Rebs: Sedova 11; Asts: Kucheryavykh 5		Pts: Anderson 23; Rebs: Anderson 13; Asts: Alameddine 6

Jawaharlal Nehru Indoor Stadium, Chennai

== Qualifying round ==
Winners are promoted to Level I for the 2011 championships.

23 September
13:00

Report

Thailand	58–83	Lebanon
Scoring by quarter: 21–22, 11–25, 18–17, 8–19
Pts: Suksomwong 21; Rebs: Banmoo 8 Asts: Jantakan 8		Pts: Anderson 24; Rebs: Anderson 15; Asts: Nasr 9

Jawaharlal Nehru Indoor Stadium, Chennai

23 September
15:00

Report

India	90–74	Malaysia
Scoring by quarter: 24–16, 20–26, 25–18, 21–14
Pts: H. Kaur 31; Rebs: H. Kaur 16; Asts: Pauldurai 7		Pts: Goh B.F. 16; Rebs: Yong S.M., Kew S.M. 6 Asts: Pee Y.Y., Kew S.M. 4

Jawaharlal Nehru Indoor Stadium, Chennai

== Final round ==
Semifinals
September 23
South Korea	101
Japan	57
September 23
China	70
Chinese Taipei	59

Final
September 24
South Korea	71
China	91
3rd place
September 24
Japan	72
Chinese Taipei	57

=== Semifinals ===
23 September
17:00

Report

South Korea	101–57	Japan
Scoring by quarter: 30–5, 18–15, 30–20, 23–17
Pts: Kim K.R. 19; Rebs: Lee M.S., Jung S.M. 5 Asts: Lee M.S. 4		Pts: Yamada 12; Rebs: Koiso 6 Asts: Obata 4

Jawaharlal Nehru Indoor Stadium, Chennai

23 September
19:00

Report

China	70–59	Chinese Taipei
Scoring by quarter: 27–17, 13–20, 16–8, 14–14
Pts: Chen X.L., Liu D. 12; Rebs: Chen N. 8 Asts: Bian L., Miao L.J. 5		Pts: Cheng H.Y. 11; Rebs: Lin C.W. 3 Asts: Liu C.Y. 4

Jawaharlal Nehru Indoor Stadium, Chennai

=== 3rd place ===
24 September
14:00

Report

Japan	72–57	Chinese Taipei
Scoring by quarter: 18–11, 21–8, 12–18, 21–20
Pts: Koiso 21; Rebs: Koiso 13; Asts: Yoshida 9		Pts: Cheng H.Y. 17; Rebs: Liu C.Y. 8 Asts: Lin C.W., Cheng H.Y., Ma Y.H. 3

Jawaharlal Nehru Indoor Stadium, Chennai

=== Final ===
24 September
16:00

Report

South Korea	71–91	China
Scoring by quarter: 17–18, 14–21, 15–28, 25–24
Pts: Beon Y.H. 29; Rebs: Jung S.M., Kim J.E. 4 Asts: Lee M.S. 3		Pts: Chen N. 17; Rebs: Chen N. 9 Asts: Miao L.J. 8

Jawaharlal Nehru Indoor Stadium, Chennai

== Final standing ==
Qualified for the 2010 FIBA World Championship for Women

Rank	Team	Record
1st place, gold medalist(s)	China	7–0
2nd place, silver medalist(s)	South Korea	5–2
3rd place, bronze medalist(s)	Japan	4–3
4	Chinese Taipei	2–5
5	Thailand	1–5
6	India	1–5
7	Malaysia	4–2
8	Lebanon	5–1
9	Kazakhstan	3–2
10	Philippines	3–2
11	Uzbekistan	1–4
12	Sri Lanka	0–5

== Awards ==
2009 Asian champions

China
Tenth title

- Most Valuable Player: (China) Bian Lan
