= 2011 FIBA Asia Championship for Women =

2011 FIBA Women's Asia Cup
24th Asian Women's Basketball Championship
- Official logo of the 2011 FIBA Asia Championship for Women

Tournament details
- Host country: Japan
- Dates: August 21–28
- Teams: 12 (from 44 federations)
- Venue: 1 (in 1 host city)

Final positions
- Champions: China (11th title)

Tournament statistics
- MVP: (China) Miao Lijie
- Top scorer: (Lebanon) Denson (20.5)
- Top rebounds: (Lebanon) Denson (10.0)
- Top assists: (Japan) Yoshida (4.2)
- PPG (Team): South Korea (79.3)
- RPG (Team): Kazakhstan (44.2)
- APG (Team): South Korea (16.4)

Official website
- 2011 FIBA Asia Championship for Women

The 2011 FIBA Asia Championship for Women was the qualifying tournament for FIBA Asia at the women's basketball tournament at the 2012 Summer Olympics at London. The tournament was held in Omura, Japan from August 21 to August 28.

The championship was divided into two levels: Level I and Level II. The two lowest finishers of Level I met the top two finishers of Level II to determine which teams qualified for the top Level of the 2013 Championship. The losers were relegated to Level II.

== Participating teams ==
Level I	Level II
China; South Korea; Japan; Chinese Taipei; India; Lebanon	Malaysia; Kazakhstan; Uzbekistan; Sri Lanka; Indonesia; Singapore

== Squads ==
Each team had a roster of maximum twelve players. Only one naturalized player per team was allowed by FIBA.

== Preliminary round ==
=== Level I ===
Team	Pld	W	L	PF	PA	PD	Pts
South Korea	5	5	0	421	341	+80	10
China	5	4	1	407	311	+96	9
Japan	5	3	2	349	296	+53	8
Chinese Taipei	5	2	3	348	330	+18	7
Lebanon	5	1	4	308	395	−87	6
India	5	0	5	241	401	−160	5

August 21
15:00

Report

Chinese Taipei	81–53	India
Scoring by quarter: 20–15, 21–11, 25–12, 15–15
Pts: Liu C.Y. 19; Rebs: Lin C.W. 9 Asts: Chiang F.C. 2		Pts: Jose 18; Rebs: Jose 8 Asts: Pauldurai 2

Municipal Sports & Culture Center, Omura
Referees: Ho Chin Who (MAS), Ajith Kumara Mangala (SRI), Puah Sheng Jie (SIN)

August 21
17:00

Report

South Korea	99–93 (2OT)	China
Scoring by quarter: 16–16, 24–16, 15–23, 21–21, Overtime: 10–10, 13–7
Pts: Choi Y.A. 29; Rebs: Choi Y.A. 5 Asts: Sin J.J. 5		Pts: Chen N. 27; Rebs: Chen N. 12; Asts: Miao L.J. 2

Municipal Sports & Culture Center, Omura
Referees: Aleksandr Gorshkov (RUS), Ravshan Ganiev (UZB), Harja Jaladri (INA)

August 21
19:00

Report

Lebanon	49–77	Japan
Scoring by quarter: 9–22, 12–18, 14–19, 14–18
Pts: Denson 14; Rebs: Denson 10; Asts: 0		Pts: Takada 15; Rebs: Mitani 8 Asts: Kudeken 5

Municipal Sports & Culture Center, Omura
Referees: Angelica Suffren (USA), Anton Kozlov (KAZ), Hii How Ming (MAS)

August 22
15:00

Report

India	47–83	South Korea
Scoring by quarter: 12–17, 10–24, 17–22, 8–20
Pts: Jose 27; Rebs: Jose 10; Asts: A. Singh 4		Pts: Kang A.J. 17; Rebs: Kim K.R. 9 Asts: Kim J.Y. 6

Municipal Sports & Culture Center, Omura
Referees: Ravshan Ganiev (UZB), Puah Sheng Jie (SIN), Anton Kozlov (KAZ)

August 22
17:00

Report

Lebanon	58–79	China
Scoring by quarter: 19–13, 16–26, 12–19, 11–21
Pts: Denson 24; Rebs: Denson 7 Asts: Nasr 2		Pts: Gao S. 19; Rebs: Gao S. 8 Asts: Xu N. 3

Municipal Sports & Culture Center, Omura
Referees: Angelica Suffren (USA), Hii How Ming (MAS), Ajith Kumara Mangala (SRI)

August 22
19:00

Report

Japan	81–54	Chinese Taipei
Scoring by quarter: 27–10, 22–21, 22–11, 10–12
Pts: Mamiya 14; Rebs: Takada 9 Asts: Oga 8		Pts: Liu C.Y. 13; Rebs: Lin C.W., Li Y.R. 6 Asts: Li Y.R., Liu C.Y. 2

Municipal Sports & Culture Center, Omura
Referees: Aleksandr Gorshkov (RUS), Ho Chin Who (MAS), Harja Jaladri (INA)

August 23
15:00

Report

China	87–38	India
Scoring by quarter: 12–12, 16–6, 32–8, 27–12
Pts: Wei W. 15; Rebs: Wei W. 12; Asts: Ding Y. 4		Pts: Jose 12; Rebs: P. Singh 5 Asts: Netam, Pauldurai 1

Municipal Sports & Culture Center, Omura
Referees: Ho Chin Who (MAS), Harja Jaladri (INA), Puah Sheng Jie (SIN)

August 23
17:00

Report

Chinese Taipei	83–55	Lebanon
Scoring by quarter: 24–12, 16–13, 22–13, 21–17
Pts: Chiang F.C. 19; Rebs: Liu C.Y. 6 Asts: Ma Y.H. 7		Pts: Akl 21; Rebs: Denson 10; Asts: Alameddine, Nasr 2

Municipal Sports & Culture Center, Omura
Referees: Hii How Ming (MAS), Ajith Kumara Mangala (SRI), Ravshan Ganiev (UZB)

August 23
19:00

Report

South Korea	66–59	Japan
Scoring by quarter: 6–20, 22–18, 18–13, 20–8
Pts: Kim D.B. 24; Rebs: Sin J.J. 8 Asts: Lee M.S., Kim D.B. 3		Pts: Oga 15; Rebs: Takada, Tokashiki 9 Asts: Yoshida 4

Municipal Sports & Culture Center, Omura
Referees: Aleksandr Gorshkov (RUS), Angelica Suffren (USA), Anton Kozlov (KAZ)

August 24
15:00

Report

Lebanon	75–104	South Korea
Scoring by quarter: 21–34, 22–25, 19–23, 13–22
Pts: Denson 25; Rebs: Denson 6 Asts: Akl 4		Pts: Kang A.J. 23; Rebs: Kim K.R. 10; Asts: Kim J.Y. 9

Municipal Sports & Culture Center, Omura
Referees: Ravshan Ganiev (UZB), Anton Kozlov (KAZ), Ho Chin Who (MAS)

August 24
17:00

Report

Chinese Taipei	63–72	China
Scoring by quarter: 16–18, 16–15, 16–22, 15–17
Pts: Lan J.Y. 12; Rebs: Chu Y.H. 4 Asts: Lin C.W. 3		Pts: Chen N. 24; Rebs: Chen N. 10; Asts: Miao L.J., Ma Z.Y. 4

Municipal Sports & Culture Center, Omura
Referees: Aleksandr Gorshkov (RUS), Puah Sheng Jie (SIN), Hii How Ming (MAS)

August 24
19:00

Report

Japan	79–51	India
Scoring by quarter: 14–5, 20–16, 25–20, 20–10
Pts: Nagaoka 22; Rebs: Nagaoka 14; Asts: Oba 4		Pts: Jose 16; Rebs: Four players 4 Asts: Sidhu 2

Municipal Sports & Culture Center, Omura
Referees: Angelica Suffren (USA), Harja Jaladri (INA), Ajith Kumara Mangala (SRI)

August 25
15:00

Report

India	52–71	Lebanon
Scoring by quarter: 4–20, 13–12, 9–23, 26–16
Pts: Jose 21; Rebs: Jose 9 Asts: Pauldurai 5		Pts: Nasr, Denson 16; Rebs: Nasr 10; Asts: Nasr 4

Municipal Sports & Culture Center, Omura
Referees: Anton Kozlov (KAZ), Harja Jaladri (INA), Puah Sheng Jie (SIN)

August 25
17:00

Report

South Korea	69–67	Chinese Taipei
Scoring by quarter: 25–18, 10–15, 18–15, 16–19
Pts: Kim J.E. 17; Rebs: Kang Y.S. 7 Asts: Choi Y.A. 7		Pts: Chiang F.C. 24; Rebs: Chen Y.F. 8 Asts: Ma Y.H. 4

Municipal Sports & Culture Center, Omura
Referees: Angelica Suffren (USA), Ravshan Ganiev (UZB), Hii How Ming (MAS)

August 25
19:00

Report

China	76–53	Japan
Scoring by quarter: 19–19, 21–10, 21–10, 15–14
Pts: Ji Y.Y. 17; Rebs: Gao S. 6 Asts: Yang B.B. 3		Pts: Nagi 13; Rebs: Takada 7 Asts: Kudeken, Nagaoka 3

Municipal Sports & Culture Center, Omura
Referees: Aleksandr Gorshkov (RUS), Ajith Kumara Mangala (SRI), Ho Chin Who (MAS)

=== Level II ===
Team	Pld	W	L	PF	PA	PD	Pts	Tiebreaker
Malaysia	5	4	1	360	241	+119	9	1–1 / 1.094
Kazakhstan	5	4	1	371	297	+74	9	1–1 / 0.986
Indonesia	5	4	1	352	329	+23	9	1–1 / 0.935
Uzbekistan	5	2	3	339	290	+49	7	
Singapore	5	1	4	251	386	−135	6	
Sri Lanka	5	0	5	234	364	−130	5	

August 21
9:00

Report

Sri Lanka	53–67	Indonesia
Scoring by quarter: 17–23, 14–17, 6–17, 16–10
Pts: Sandamali 16; Rebs: Silva 12; Asts: Silva 2		Pts: Sugianto 14; Rebs: Ibo 7 Asts: Sugianto 4

Municipal Sports & Culture Center, Omura
Referees: Fawzi Al-Achkouty (LIB), Kim Young-Hyun (KOR), Kimiko Nakadake (JPN)

August 21
11:00

Report

Kazakhstan	53–73	Malaysia
Scoring by quarter: 5–18, 17–23, 18–14, 13–18
Pts: Kurazova 16; Rebs: Vinokurova 9 Asts: Seregina, Kucheryavykh, Kondrakova 1		Pts: Goh B.F. 15; Rebs: Teo W.Y., Kalaimathi 4 Asts: Yaakob 2

Municipal Sports & Culture Center, Omura
Referees: Yang Maogong (CHN), Yuki Kubo (JPN), Lee Ji-Youn (KOR)

August 21
13:00

Report

Singapore	45–73	Uzbekistan
Scoring by quarter: 12–21, 11–18, 10–15, 12–19
Pts: Jy. Tan 17; Rebs: A. Lim 4 Asts: Sunarko 2		Pts: Khusnitdinova 25; Rebs: Averyanova 10; Asts: Zakharova, Khusnitdinova, Polunina 1

Municipal Sports & Culture Center, Omura
Referees: Peng Ling (CHN), Huang Yi-chi (TPE), Ceciline Vino (IND)

August 22
9:00

Report

Indonesia	69–87	Kazakhstan
Scoring by quarter: 13–30, 18–20, 20–26, 18–11
Pts: Ningrum 31; Rebs: Sophia 8 Asts: Sugianto 3		Pts: Alishauskaite 17; Rebs: Vinokurova 11; Asts: Vinokurova 3

Municipal Sports & Culture Center, Omura
Referees: Huang Yi-chi (TPE), Fawzi Al-Achkouty (LIB), Somasundaramoorthy Shanmugasundaram (IND)

August 22
11:00

Report

Singapore	26–91	Malaysia
Scoring by quarter: 0–24, 7–24, 10–25, 9–18
Pts: Lim J.M., Jy. Tan 6 Rebs: Ang 5 Asts: Ang, Jy. Tan 1		Pts: Ang S.T. 25; Rebs: Hee S.Y. 8 Asts: Yaakob, Chen H.J. 2

Municipal Sports & Culture Center, Omura
Referees: Yang Maogong (CHN), Chen Ming-ling (TPE), Takashi Ogata (JPN)

August 22
13:00

Report

Uzbekistan	82–50	Sri Lanka
Scoring by quarter: 20–6, 23–12, 12–14, 27–18
Pts: Khusnitdinova 17; Rebs: Obechkina, Komarova 10; Asts: Khusnitdinova, Kashuba 2		Pts: Gallage 11; Rebs: Silva 13; Asts: Gallage, Thalagala, Perera 1

Municipal Sports & Culture Center, Omura
Referees: Peng Ling (CHN), Lee Ji-Youn (KOR), Ikuko Kozakai (JPN)

August 23
9:00

Report

Malaysia	66–74	Indonesia
Scoring by quarter: 16–31, 11–10, 21–15, 18–18
Pts: Teo W.Y., Kew S.M. 13; Rebs: Pang H.P. 7 Asts: Pang H.P., Kalaimathi 2		Pts: Ningrum 23; Rebs: Sophia 12; Asts: Ningrum 6

Municipal Sports & Culture Center, Omura
Referees: Peng Ling (CHN), Kimiko Nakadake (JPN), Chen Ming-ling (TPE)

August 23
11:00

Report

Sri Lanka	59–70	Singapore
Scoring by quarter: 18–16, 12–12, 8–19, 21–23
Pts: Sandamali 19; Rebs: Gunawijaya 13; Asts: Gunawijaya 3		Pts: Ang 16; Rebs: Koh W.B., Tang C.T. 9 Asts: Sunarko 5

Municipal Sports & Culture Center, Omura
Referees: Kim Young-Hyun (KOR), Somasundaramoorthy Shanmugasundaram (IND), Yuki Kubo (JPN)

August 23
13:00

Report

Kazakhstan	62–61	Uzbekistan
Scoring by quarter: 18–11, 12–11, 13–13, 19–26
Pts: Kurazova 16; Rebs: Kurazova 13; Asts: Kucheryavykh 4		Pts: Khusnitdinova 25; Rebs: Khusnitdinova, Averyanova 7 Asts: Burieva 3

Municipal Sports & Culture Center, Omura
Referees: Yang Maogong (CHN), Ceciline Vino (IND), Fawzi Al-Achkouty (LIB)

August 24
9:00

Report

Singapore	52–89	Kazakhstan
Scoring by quarter: 5–21, 14–21, 17–20, 16–27
Pts: Jy. Tan 18; Rebs: Koh W.B. 8 Asts: Lim, Koh W.B. 2		Pts: Seregina 27; Rebs: Seregina 12; Asts: Kucheryavykh, Alishauskaite 5

Municipal Sports & Culture Center, Omura
Referees: Ceciline Vino (IND), Ikuko Kozakai (JPN), Chen Ming-ling (TPE)

August 24
11:00

Report

Sri Lanka	30–65	Malaysia
Scoring by quarter: 5–20, 5–17, 11–14, 9–14
Pts: Gunawijaya 9 Rebs: Silva 10; Asts: Fernando, Gallage, Sandamali 1		Pts: Ang S.T. 11; Rebs: Saw W.Y., Pang H.P., Kew S.M. 8 Asts: Saw W.Y. 7

Municipal Sports & Culture Center, Omura
Referees: Lee Ji-Youn (KOR), Takashi Ogata (JPN), Huang Yi-chi (TPE)

August 24
13:00

Report

Uzbekistan	65–68	Indonesia
Scoring by quarter: 14–17, 7–18, 27–15, 17–18
Pts: Khusnitdinova 19; Rebs: Mikulenko 9 Asts: Polunina 2		Pts: Ningrum 20; Rebs: Ibo 11; Asts: Ningrum 4

Municipal Sports & Culture Center, Omura
Referees: Peng Ling (CHN), Somasundaramoorthy Shanmugasundaram (IND), Kim Young-Hyun (KOR)

August 25
9:00

Report

Indonesia	74–58	Singapore
Scoring by quarter: 21–15, 14–17, 20–7, 19–19
Pts: Ibo 20; Rebs: Ibo 8 Asts: Ningrum 8		Pts: Koh W.B. 21; Rebs: Lim, Koh W.B. 7 Asts: Koh W.B. 9

Municipal Sports & Culture Center, Omura
Referees: Yuki Kubo (JPN), Lee Ji-Youn (KOR), Somasundaramoorthy Shanmugasundaram (IND)

August 25
11:00

Report

Kazakhstan	80–42	Sri Lanka
Scoring by quarter: 17–13, 24–4, 24–10, 15–15
Pts: Vinokurova, Kondrakova 14; Rebs: Ivanova 8 Asts: Kucheryavykh 5		Pts: Sandamali 21; Rebs: Gallage, Sandamali, Silva 6 Asts: Silva 2

Municipal Sports & Culture Center, Omura
Referees: Kimiko Nakadake (JPN), Huang Yi-chi (TPE), Fawzi Al-Achkouty (LIB)

August 25
13:00

Report

Malaysia	65–58	Uzbekistan
Scoring by quarter: 15–20, 20–13, 14–11, 16–14
Pts: Pang H.P. 15; Rebs: Pang H.P. 6 Asts: Saw W.Y. 5		Pts: Polunina 17; Rebs: Mikulenko 13; Asts: Khusnitdinova, Polunina 4

Municipal Sports & Culture Center, Omura
Referees: Yang Maogong (CHN), Ceciline Vino (IND), Ikuko Kozakai (JPN)

== Qualifying round ==
Winners are promoted to Level I for the 2013 championships.

August 27
13:30

Report

Lebanon	65–54	Kazakhstan
Scoring by quarter: 26–14, 8–13, 11–14, 20–13
Pts: Denson 31; Rebs: Denson 20; Asts: Nasr 5		Pts: Kurazova, Kondrakova 17; Rebs: Kondrakova 13; Asts: Kurazova, Kondrakova 2

Municipal Sports & Culture Center, Omura
Referees: Ajith Kumara Mangala (SRI), Chen Ming-ling (TPE), Takashi Ogata (JPN)

August 27
15:30

Report

India	66–60	Malaysia
Scoring by quarter: 17–19, 14–10, 21–12, 14–19
Pts: Pauldurai 23; Rebs: Jose 10; Asts: A. Singh, Pauldurai 5		Pts: Teo W.Y. 13; Rebs: Pang H.P. 4 Asts: Kew S.M. 4

Municipal Sports & Culture Center, Omura
Referees: Kim Young-Hyun (KOR), Peng Ling (CHN), Ravshan Ganiev (UZB)

== Final round ==
Semifinals
August 27
China	76
Japan	62
August 27
South Korea	72
Chinese Taipei	66

Final
August 28
China	65
South Korea	62
3rd place
August 28
Japan	83
Chinese Taipei	56

=== Semifinals ===
August 27
17:30

Report

China	76–62	Japan
Scoring by quarter: 21–8, 17–13, 22–21, 16–20
Pts: Chen N. 21; Rebs: Chen N. 10; Asts: Yang B.B., Miao L.J. 4		Pts: Oga 14; Rebs: Tokashiki, Yoshida 4 Asts: Yoshida 8

Municipal Sports & Culture Center, Omura
Referees: Angelica Suffren (USA), Fawzi Al-Achkouty (LIB), Harja Jaladri (INA)

August 27
19:30

Report

South Korea	72–66	Chinese Taipei
Scoring by quarter: 14–16, 20–13, 17–19, 21–18
Pts: Sin J.J. 15; Rebs: Sin J.J. 8 Asts: Kim D.B. 4		Pts: Chiang F.C., Liu C.Y. 15; Rebs: Liu C.Y. 9 Asts: Chen Y.F., Lin C.W. 2

Municipal Sports & Culture Center, Omura
Referees: Aleksandr Gorshkov (RUS), Ho Chin Who (MAS), Ceciline Vino (IND)

=== 3rd place ===
August 28
14:00

Report

Japan	83–56	Chinese Taipei
Scoring by quarter: 28–10, 27–9, 12–15, 16–22
Pts: Takada 25; Rebs: Nagaoka 5 Asts: Oga 6		Pts: Chiang F.C. 24; Rebs: Chiang F.C., Lin C.W. 6 Asts: Ma Y.H. 6

Municipal Sports & Culture Center, Omura
Referees: Angelica Suffren (USA), Fawzi Al-Achkouty (LIB), Ho Chin Who (MAS)

=== Final ===
August 28
16:00

Report

China	65–62	South Korea
Scoring by quarter: 10–9, 24–19, 11–19, 20–15
Pts: Miao L.J. 20; Rebs: Chen N. 10; Asts: Ding Y., Miao L.J. 3		Pts: Sin J.J. 15; Rebs: Sin J.J. 16; Asts: Sin J.J. 5

Municipal Sports & Culture Center, Omura
Referees: Aleksandr Gorshkov (RUS), Hii How Ming (MAS), Ceciline Vino (IND)

== Final standing ==
Qualified for the 2012 Summer Olympics
Qualified for the Olympic Qualifying Tournament

Rank	Team	Record
1st place, gold medalist(s)	China	6–1
2nd place, silver medalist(s)	South Korea	6–1
3rd place, bronze medalist(s)	Japan	4–3
4	Chinese Taipei	2–5
5	Lebanon	2–4
6	India	1–5
7	Malaysia	4–2
8	Kazakhstan	4–2
9	Indonesia	4–1
10	Uzbekistan	2–3
11	Singapore	1–4
12	Sri Lanka	0–5

== Awards ==
2011 Asian champions

China
Eleventh title

- Most Valuable Player: (China) Miao Lijie

All-Star Team:

- PG – (Japan) Yuko Oga
- SG – (South Korea) Choi Youn-Ah
- SF – (China) Miao Lijie
- PF – (South Korea) Sin Jung-Ja
- C – (China) Chen Nan
