= 2008 United States women's Olympic basketball team =

- Head coach: Anne Donovan
- Scoring leader: Sylvia Fowles 13.4
- Rebounding leader: Sylvia Fowles 8.4
- Assists leader: Kara Lawson 3.4
- Biggest win: 56 vs. Mali
- Biggest defeat: none

The 2008 United States women's Olympic basketball team competed in the Games of the XXVIX Olympiad which were held in Beijing, China. The U.S. women's Olympic team won their sixth gold medal, and fourth consecutive, at the event. They went undefeated, beating Australia in the Gold medal final for the third time in a row.

== Roster ==
United States women's national basketball team – 2008 Summer Olympics roster
Players
Coaches

Pos.	No.	Name	Age – Date of birth	Height	Club	Ctr.
F	5	Seimone Augustus	24 – April 30, 1984	6 ft 1 in (1.85 m)	Minnesota Lynx	(United States)
G	6	Sue Bird	27 – October 16, 1980	5 ft 9 in (1.75 m)	Seattle Storm	(United States)
F	10	Tamika Catchings	29 – July 21, 1979	6 ft 0 in (1.83 m)	Indiana Fever	(United States)
C	13	Sylvia Fowles	23 – June 10, 1985	6 ft 6 in (1.98 m)	Chicago Sky	(United States)
G	7	Kara Lawson	27 – February 14, 1981	5 ft 8 in (1.73 m)	Sacramento Monarchs	(United States)
C	9	Lisa Leslie	36 – July 7, 1972	6 ft 5 in (1.96 m)	Los Angeles Sparks	(United States)
F	8	DeLisha Milton-Jones	33 – September 11, 1974	6 ft 1 in (1.85 m)	Los Angeles Sparks	(United States)
G/F	15	Candace Parker	22 – April 19, 1986	6 ft 4 in (1.93 m)	Los Angeles Sparks	(United States)
G	4	Cappie Pondexter	25 – January 7, 1983	5 ft 9 in (1.75 m)	Phoenix Mercury	(United States)
G	14	Katie Smith	34 – June 4, 1974	5 ft 11 in (1.8 m)	Detroit Shock	(United States)
G/F	12	Diana Taurasi	26 – June 11, 1982	6 ft 0 in (1.83 m)	Phoenix Mercury	(United States)
F	11	Tina Thompson	33 – February 10, 1975	6 ft 2 in (1.88 m)	Houston Comets	(United States)

Head coach

- (United States) Anne Donovan

Assistant coach(es)

- (United States) Gail Goestenkors
- (United States) Dawn Staley
- (United States) Mike Thibault

Legend

- Club – describes last
  club before the tournament
- Age – describes age
  on August 9, 2008

== Results ==
=== Group stage ===
August 9, 2008
20:00

Report

Czech Republic	57–97	United States
Scoring by quarter: 17–22, 14–27, 13–26, 13–22
Pts: Veselá 8 Rebs: Veselá 9 Asts: Machová 4		Pts: Pondexter 12; Rebs: Fowles 14; Asts: Lawson 3

Wukesong Indoor Stadium, Beijing
Attendance: 11,083
Referees: Michael Aylen (AUS)

August 11, 2008
20:00

Report

China	63–108	United States
Scoring by quarter: 11–33, 16–28, 19–20, 17–27
Pts: Miao 16; Rebs: Bian, Liu, Sui 4 Asts: Miao, Shao 3		Pts: Thompson 27; Rebs: Leslie 10; Asts: Lawson, Pondexter 5

Wukesong Indoor Stadium, Beijing
Attendance: 11,083
Referees: Romualdas Brazauskas (LTU)

August 13, 2008
22:15

Report

Mali	41–97	United States
Scoring by quarter: 12–24, 16–27, 5–25, 9–21
Pts: Sininta 13; Rebs: Sissoko 7 Asts: Bagayoko 3		Pts: Leslie 16; Rebs: Fowles 6 Asts: Lawson 7

Wukesong Indoor Stadium, Beijing
Attendance: 11,083
Referees: Maogong Yang (CHN)

August 15, 2008
20:00

Report

United States	93–55	Spain
Scoring by quarter: 22–17, 17–17, 23–10, 31–11
Pts: Thompson 17; Rebs: Leslie 11; Asts: Lawson, Leslie, Parker 2		Pts: Valdemoro 17; Rebs: Nicholls 5 Asts: Martínez 2

Wukesong Indoor Stadium, Beijing
Attendance: 11,083
Referees: Fabio Facchini (ITA)

August 17, 2008
22:15

Report

New Zealand	60–96	United States
Scoring by quarter: 18–23, 6–27, 18–25, 18–21
Pts: Marino 17; Rebs: Harmon 7 Asts: Marino 17		Pts: Thompson 15; Rebs: Leslie, Fowles 6 Asts: Taurasi 5

Wukesong Indoor Stadium, Beijing
Attendance: 11,083
Referees: Luigi Lamonica (ITA)

=== Quarterfinal ===
August 19, 2008
20:00

Report

United States	104–60	South Korea
Scoring by quarter: 25–21, 26–9, 26–9, 27–21
Pts: Fowles 26; Rebs: Fowles 14; Asts: Augustus 3		Pts: Kim 14; Rebs: Kim 5 Asts: Park 7

Wukesong Indoor Stadium, Beijing
Attendance: 11,083
Referees: Stephen Seibel (USA)

=== Semifinal ===
August 21, 2008
20:00

Report

Russia	52–67	United States
Scoring by quarter: 16–13, 16–20, 8–15, 12–19
Pts: Stepanova 14; Rebs: Korstin 8 Asts: Six-way tie 1		Pts: Taurasi 21; Rebs: Fowles 10; Asts: Smith 3

Wukesong Indoor Stadium, Beijing
Attendance: 11,083
Referees: Cristiano Maranho (BRA)

=== Gold Medal Final ===
August 23, 2008
22:00

Report

United States	92–65	Australia
Scoring by quarter: 22–15, 25–15, 22–24, 23–11
Pts: Lawson 15; Rebs: Leslie 7 Asts: Thompson 4		Pts: Jackson 20; Rebs: Jackson 10; Asts: Grima 2

Wukesong Indoor Stadium, Beijing
Attendance: 11,083
Referees: Nikolaos Zavlanos (GRE)

== See also ==
- 2008 Summer Olympics
- Basketball at the 2008 Summer Olympics
- United States at the 2008 Summer Olympics
- United States women's national basketball team
