= Shenyang Army Golden Lions =

Dissolved Chinese basketball team

- League: Women's Chinese Basketball Association
- Dissolved: 2018
- Affiliation(s): Shenyang Military Region
- Championships: 1 (2011)

Shenyang Army Golden Lions, or Shenbu Golden Lions, was a Chinese women's professional basketball club in the Women's Chinese Basketball Association, owned by the Shenyang Military Region. The team was based in Liaoning province except for the 2004 season, during which it played its home games in Dalang, Dongguan, Guangdong.

== Season-by-season records ==
Season	Corporate Sponsor	Home City	Final Rank	Record (including playoffs)			Head coach
Season	Corporate Sponsor	Home City	Final Rank	W	L	%	Head coach
2002	Sanyo Elevator	Jinzhou, Liaoning	2nd	14	3	82.4	Zhan Shuping
2002–03	Sanyo Elevator	Jinzhou, Liaoning	9th	5	11	31.3	Zhan Shuping
2004	Sanyo Elevator	Dongguan, Guangdong	11th	3	9	25.0	Zhan Shuping
2004–05	Sanyo Elevator	Tieling, Liaoning	5th	9	9	50.0	Zhan Shuping
2005–06	Sanyo Elevator	Panjin, Liaoning	2nd	21	8	72.4	Zhan Shuping
2007	Sanyo Elevator	Panjin, Liaoning	3rd	11	4	73.3	Zhan Shuping
2007–08	Liaoyang Xinxin	Liaoyang, Liaoning	3rd	16	4	80.0	Zhan Shuping
2008–09	Liaoyang Xinxin	Liaoyang, Liaoning	8th	11	13	45.8	Zhan Shuping
2009–10	Liaoyang Xinxin	Liaoyang, Liaoning	4th	17	9	65.4	Zhan Shuping
2010–11	Liaoning Fuyuan	Dandong, Liaoning	Champion	26	5	83.9	Zhan Shuping
2011–12	Dandong Xinyu Real Estate	Dandong, Liaoning	5th	18	7	72.0	Zhan Shuping
2012–13	Wancheng Real Estate	Jinzhou, Liaoning	3rd	15	11	57.7	Zhan Shuping
2013–14	Wancheng Real Estate	Jinzhou, Liaoning; Fuxin, Liaoning	11th	2	20	9.1	Zhan Shuping
2014–15	Wancheng Real Estate	Jinzhou, Liaoning	5th	12	19	38.7	Miao Lijie
2015–16	Yanshang Group	Jinzhou, Liaoning	5th	18	16	52.9	Miao Lijie
2016–17	Dandong Yulong	Dandong, Liaoning	4th	23	17	57.5	Jia Nan
2017–18	Dandong Wuzhou	Dandong, Liaoning	13th	8	18	30.8	Jia Nan

== Notable players ==
- Li Dongmei (2002)
- Hu Xiaotao (2002–11)
- Zhang Hanlan (2002–12, 2016–17)
- Liu Dan (2002–16)
- Song Liwei (2008–13)
- Zhao Shuang (2008–17)
- Miao Lijie (2009–13, 2014–15)
- Li Meng (2012–18)
