= Naomi Yashiro =

Japanese former basketball player (born 1977)

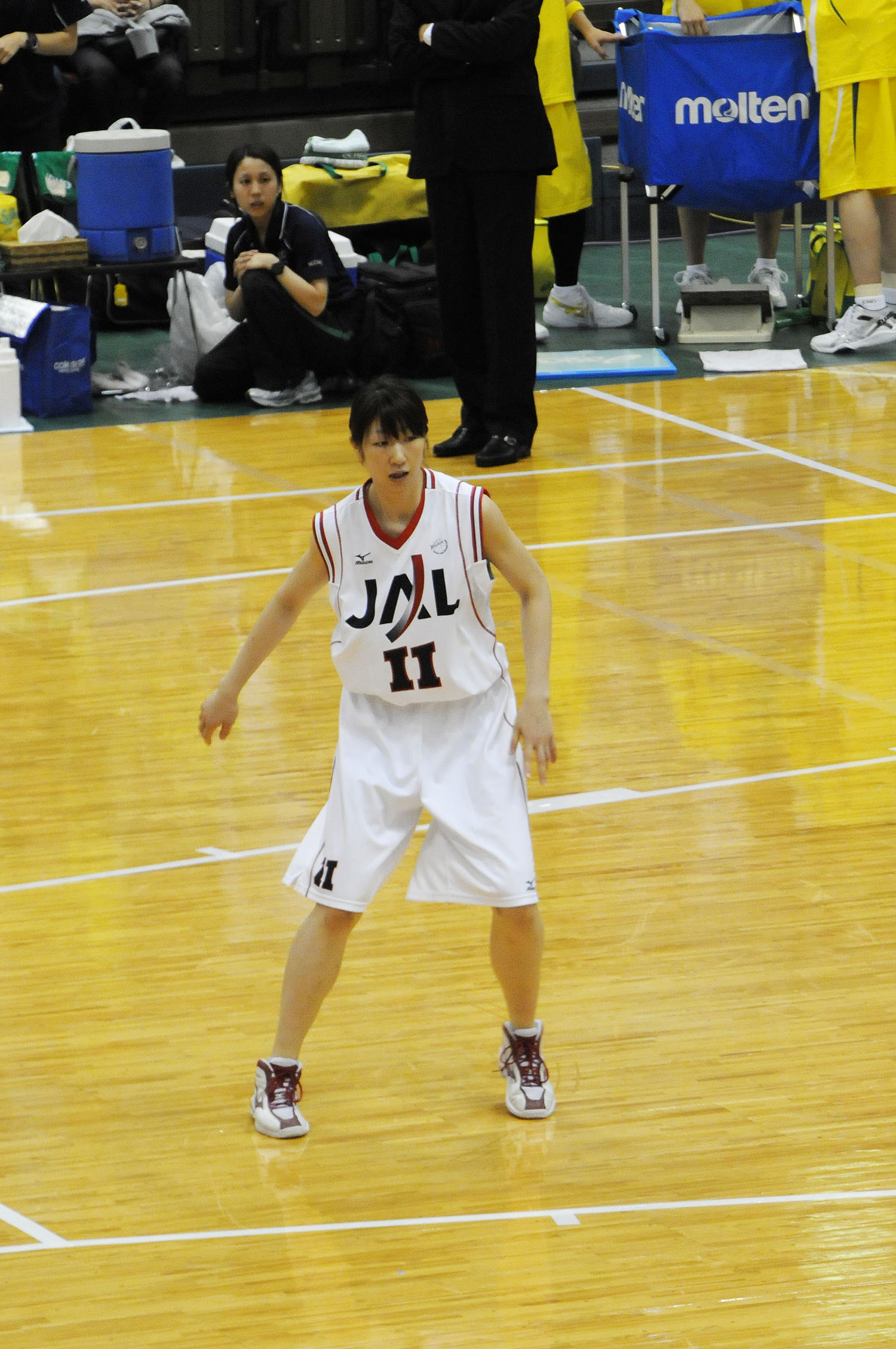

Personal information
- Nickname: Kana
- Nationality: Japanese
- Citizenship: Japan
- Born: 30 December 1977 (age 48) Takahagi
- Education: Nippon Sport Science University
- Occupation: cabin crew
- Years active: 2000-
- Employer: Japan Airlines
- Height: 182 cm (6 ft 0 in)
- Weight: 70 kg (154 lb)

Sport
- Country: Japan
- Sport: basketball
- Position: C
- Rank: Best 5
- Event(s): 2004-05 Women's Japan Basketball League, finalist
- Turned pro: 2000
- Retired: 2011

Achievements and titles
- Olympic finals: 10th, 2004 Summer Olympics
- Updated on 6 December 2016

Naomi Yashiro (矢代直美, born 30 December 1977) is a Japanese former basketball player who competed in the 2004 Summer Olympics. She has been working as a cabin crew at the Japan Airlines and joined its team JAL Rabbits.

== Profile ==
Yashiro was selected for 1999 Universiade while she was an undergraduate at Nippon Sport Science University (4th). Entered Japan Airlines as a cabin crew in 2000, then joined their basketball team JAL Rabbits to become the Rookie of the Year at the second W League of the Women's Japan Basketball League, contributing to the team's third rank. Yashiro was the women's free throw champion in the season of 2002-'03.

Competed in the 2002 FIBA World Championship for Women (13th), 2004 Summer Olympics (Note: Yusuke Fukada wrote a novela for JAL Rabbits and the members of the basketball team, and it was made into a roadshow film Flying Rabbits released in 2008 in Japan.) and 2007 FIBA Asia Championship for Women (3rd, Level 1.) Yashiro was appointed as a playing assistant coach from 2009-'10 Women's Regular League, W League for her team, and retired in 2011 when the team was dismissed. She has worked full-time as a cabin crew.
