= Kazakhstan women's national basketball team =

Kazakhstan
- FIBA ranking: 72 ▼3 (14 September 2026)
- Joined FIBA: 1992
- FIBA zone: FIBA Asia
- National federation: Kazakhstan Basketball Federation
- Coach: Evgeniy Ovsyannikov

Olympic Games
- Appearances: None

World Cup
- Appearances: None

Asia Cup
- Appearances: 12
- Medals: None
Home	Away

The Kazakhstan women's national basketball team represents Kazakhstan in international competitions. It is administered by the Kazakhstan Basketball Federation.

== Current roster ==
Roster for the 2017 FIBA Women's Asia Cup.

Kazakhstan women's national basketball team roster
Players
Coaches

Pos.	No.	Name	Age – Date of birth	Height	Club	Ctr.
PG	2	Elmira Abikeyeva	20 – 11 April 1997	1.68 m (5 ft 6 in)	Iritish Pavladar	(Kazakhstan)
PF	3	Zalina Kurazova	32 – 28 January 1985	1.84 m (6 ft 0 in)	Astana Tigers	(Kazakhstan)
PG	4	Aigerim Aldanysheva	23 – 30 November 1993	1.65 m (5 ft 5 in)	Okzhetpes Kokshetau	(Kazakhstan)
SG	6	Alexandra Kovalevskaya	20 – 8 April 1997	1.72 m (5 ft 8 in)	Astana Tigers	(Kazakhstan)
SG	7	Tamara Yagodkina	27 – 10 January 1990	1.70 m (5 ft 7 in)	Astana Tigers	(Kazakhstan)
SG	8	Mariya Astapenko	28 – 28 May 1989	1.77 m (5 ft 10 in)	Astana Tigers	(Kazakhstan)
SG	10	Olga Kolesnikova	25 – 2 February 1992	1.70 m (5 ft 7 in)	Okzhetpes Kokshetau	(Kazakhstan)
SF	11	Oxana Ivanova	27 – 19 April 1990	1.86 m (6 ft 1 in)	Astana Tigers	(Kazakhstan)
SF	12	Anastassiya Begun	21 – 22 December 1995	1.81 m (5 ft 11 in)	Astana Tigers	(Kazakhstan)
C	13	Anna Vinokurova	24 – 18 December 1992	1.90 m (6 ft 3 in)	Astana Tigers	(Kazakhstan)
SF	14	Oxana Ossipenko	32 – 4 January 1985	1.86 m (6 ft 1 in)	Astana Tigers	(Kazakhstan)
C	15	Nadezha Kondrakova	28 – 8 April 1989	1.92 m (6 ft 4 in)	Astana Tigers	(Kazakhstan)

Head coach

- (Kazakhstan) Evgeniy Ovsyannikov

Legend

- Club – describes last
  club before the tournament
- Age – describes age
  on 23 July 2017

== Competitive record ==
=== FIBA Women's Asia Cup ===
- 1994: 6th place
- 1995: 6th place
- 1997: 7th place
- 2001: 6th place
- 2005: 7th place
- 2009: 9th place
- 2011: 8th place
- 2013: 6th place
- 2015: 9th place
- 2017: 10th place
- 2021: 12th place
- 2023: 14th place
- 2025: 6th place(Div B)

=== Asian Games ===
- 1994: 5th place
- 1998: 5th place
- 2002: did not participate
- 2006: did not participate
- 2010: did not participate
- 2014: 5th place
- 2018: 5th place
- 2022: 12th place
- 2026: 9th place

== See also ==
- Kazakhstan women's national under-19 basketball team
- Kazakhstan women's national under-17 basketball team
- Kazakhstan men's national basketball team
