= Zhao Shuang =

Chinese baseball player

No. 2 – Xinjiang Tianshan
- Position: Shooting guard
- League: WCBA

Personal information
- Born: June 21, 1990 (age 36) Mudanjiang, Heilongjiang, China
- Listed height: 6 ft 0 in (1.83 m)

Career information
- Playing career: 2008–present

Career history
- 2008–2017: Shenyang Army Golden Lions
- 2018–2020: Bayi Kylin
- 2021–2022: Inner Mongolia Rural Credit Union
- 2024–present: Xinjiang Tianshan

Zhao Shuang (simplified Chinese: 赵爽; traditional Chinese: 趙爽; pinyin: Zhào Shuǎng; born 21 June 1990) is a basketball player for China women's national basketball team. She is part of the squad for the 2012 Summer Olympics.
