= Bian Lan =

Chinese basketball player

Personal information
- Born: August 17, 1984 (age 42) Yixing, Jiangsu, China
- Listed height: 6 ft 1 in (1.85 m)

Career information
- Playing career: 2002–2015
- Position: Small forward

Career history
- 2002–2009: Jiangsu Phoenix
- 2011–2014: Zhejiang Far East
- 2014–2015: Jiangsu Phoenix

Bian Lan (Chinese: 卞兰; pinyin: Biàn Lán; born August 17, 1984) is a retired Chinese basketball player. She competed in the 2004 Summer Olympics, the 2006 FIBA World Championship for Women and the 2008 Summer Olympics. In the FIBA Asia Championship for Women 2009, Bian helped China to win the tournament, she averaged 10.1 pts, 3.1 rebounds, and 3.7 assists per game and was named the MVP of the tournament.
