= Zhang Fan (basketball) =

Chinese basketball player

Personal information
- Born: August 22, 1984 (age 42) Beijing, China
- Listed height: 1.88 m (6 ft 2 in)

Career information
- Playing career: 2002–2022
- Position: Small forward
- Number: 6

Career history
- 2002–2022: Beijing Great Wall

Zhang Fan (simplified Chinese: 张帆; traditional Chinese: 張帆; born 22 August 1984) is a Chinese former professional basketball player, who competed in the 2004 Summer Olympics and the 2012 Summer Olympics.
