= Zhang Hanlan =

Chinese basketball player

Medal record

Women's basketball

Representing China

Asian Games
Gold medal – first place	2002 Busan	Team competition
Gold medal – first place	2010 Guangzhou	Team competition

Zhang Hanlan (simplified Chinese: 张晗兰; traditional Chinese: 張晗蘭; pinyin: Zhāng Hánlán; born July 19, 1979, in Shenyang, Liaoning) is a female Chinese basketball player. She was part of the teams that won gold medals at the 2002 Asian Games and the 2010 Asian Games. Zhang also competed for China at the 2008 Summer Olympics where the team came in fourth place.
