= Wei Wei (basketball) =

Chinese basketball player

Medal record

Women's basketball

Representing China

East Asian Games
Gold medal – first place	2009 Hong Kong	Team competition

Wei Wei (Chinese: 魏伟; pinyin: Wèi Wěi; born 6 October 1989 in Taigu County, Shanxi) is a basketball player for the China women's national basketball team. She was part of the squad for the 2012 Summer Olympics.
