= Lee Mi-sun =

South Korean basketball player

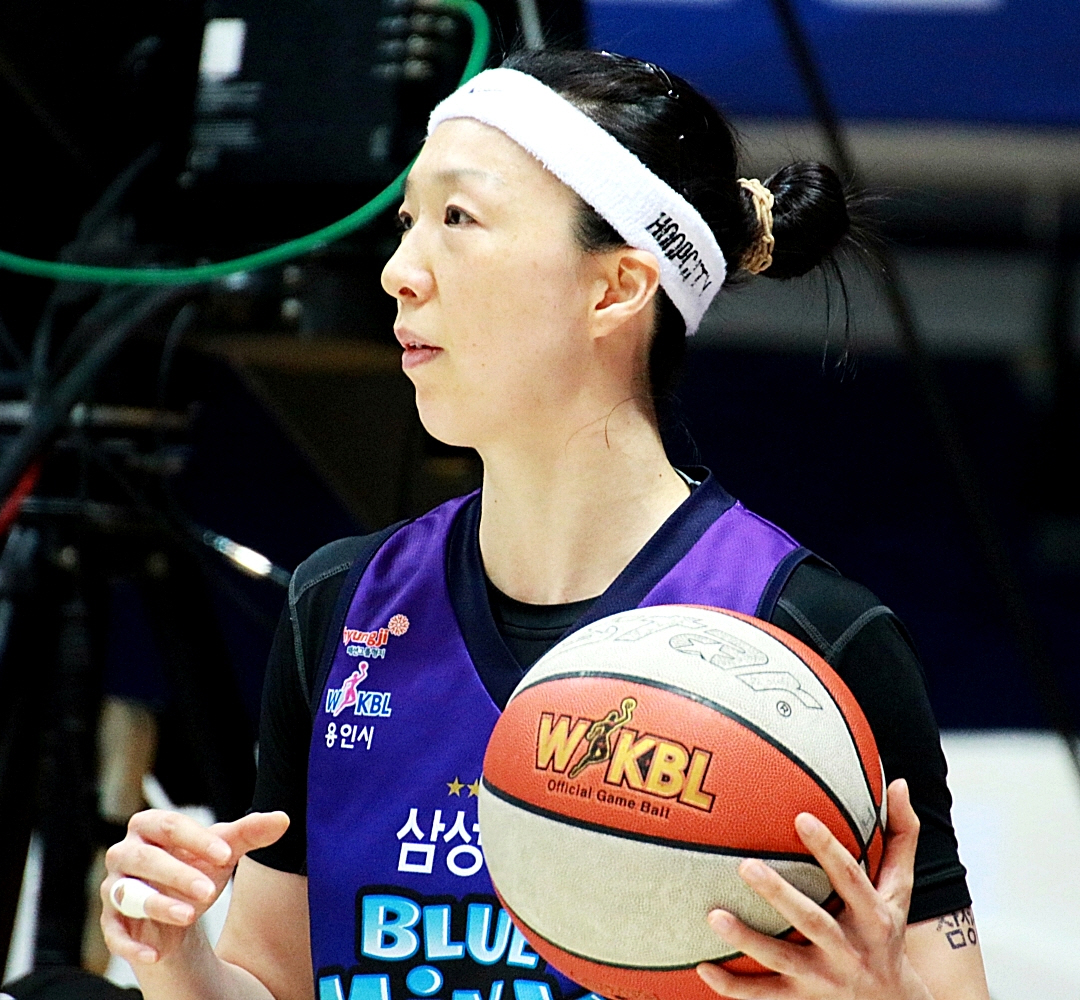
- Image of Lee Mi-sun

Korean name
- Hangul: 이미선
- RR: I Miseon
- MR: I Misŏn

Lee Mi-sun
Medal record

Women's basketball

Representing South Korea

Asian Games
| Silver medal – second place | 2002 Busan | Team competition |
| Silver medal – second place | 2010 Guangzhou | Team competition |
| Gold medal – first place | 2014 Incheon | Team competition |

Lee Mi-sun (born 19 February 1979 in Gwangju, South Korea) is a Korean former basketball player who competed in the 2000 Summer Olympics, in the 2004 Summer Olympics, and in the 2008 Summer Olympics.
