= Guan Xin =

Chinese basketball player

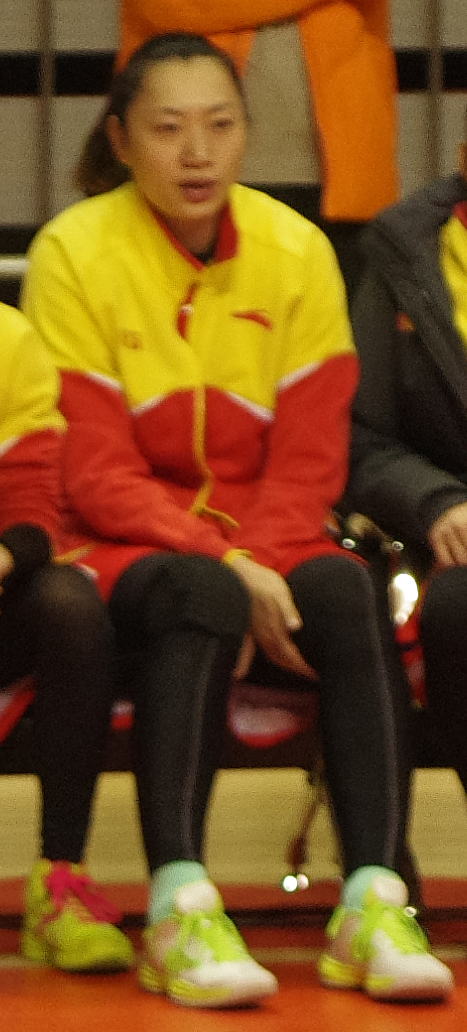
- Guan Xin in 2014

No. 9 – Shanxi Flame
- Position: Power forward
- League: WCBA

Personal information
- Born: January 24, 1987 (age 39) Changchun, Jilin, China
- Listed height: 6 ft 5 in (1.96 m)

Career information
- Playing career: 2004–2017

Career history
- 2004–06: Guangdong Dolphins
- 2006–07: AZS AJP Gorzów Wielkopolski
- 2007–13: Guangdong Dolphins
- 2013–17: Shanxi Flame

Guan Xin (Chinese: 关馨; born 24 January 1987) is a basketball player for the China women's national basketball team. She was part of the squad for the 2012 Summer Olympics.
