= Liu Dan (basketball) =

Chinese basketball player (born 1987)

Medal record

Women's basketball

Representing China

Asian Games
Gold medal – first place	2006 Doha	Team competition
Gold medal – first place	2010 Guangzhou	Team competition
Silver medal – second place	2014 Incheon	Team competition

Liu Dan (Chinese: 刘丹; pinyin: Liú Dān; born April 24, 1987, in Shenyang, Liaoning) is a female Chinese basketball player who was part of the team that won the gold medal at the 2005 Asian Championship. She competed at the 2008 Summer Olympics in Beijing.
