= Ma Zengyu =

Chinese basketball player (born 1983)

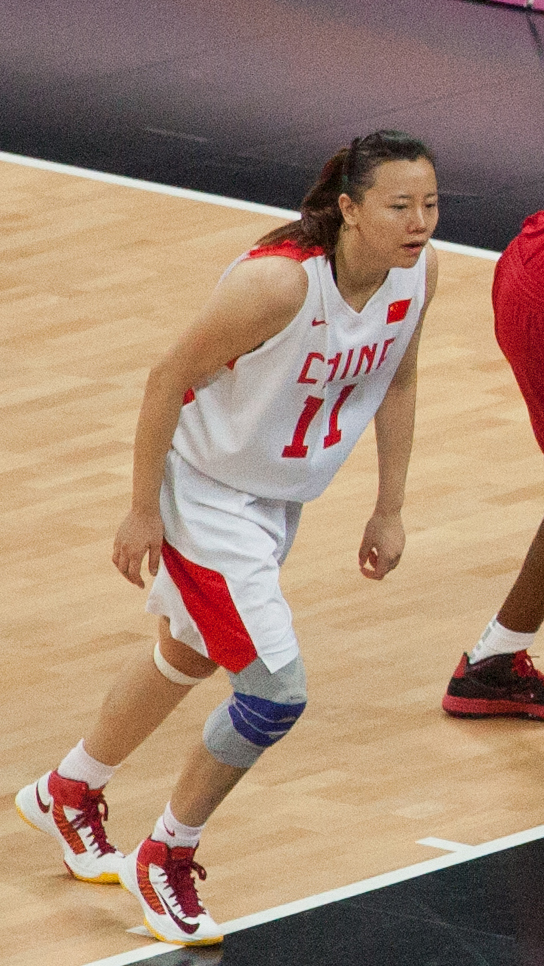
- Ma at the 2012 Summer Olympics

Medal record

Women's basketball

Representing China

Asian Games
Gold medal – first place	2010 Guangzhou	Team competition

Ma Zengyu (Chinese: 马增玉; born 7 May 1983 in Shenyang, Liaoning) is a Chinese basketball player. She plays as a shooting guard. She competed in the Women's basketball tournament at the 2012 Summer Olympics. She plays in Liaoning Hengye, in Shenyang.
