= Yuko Oga =

Japanese basketball player (born 1982)

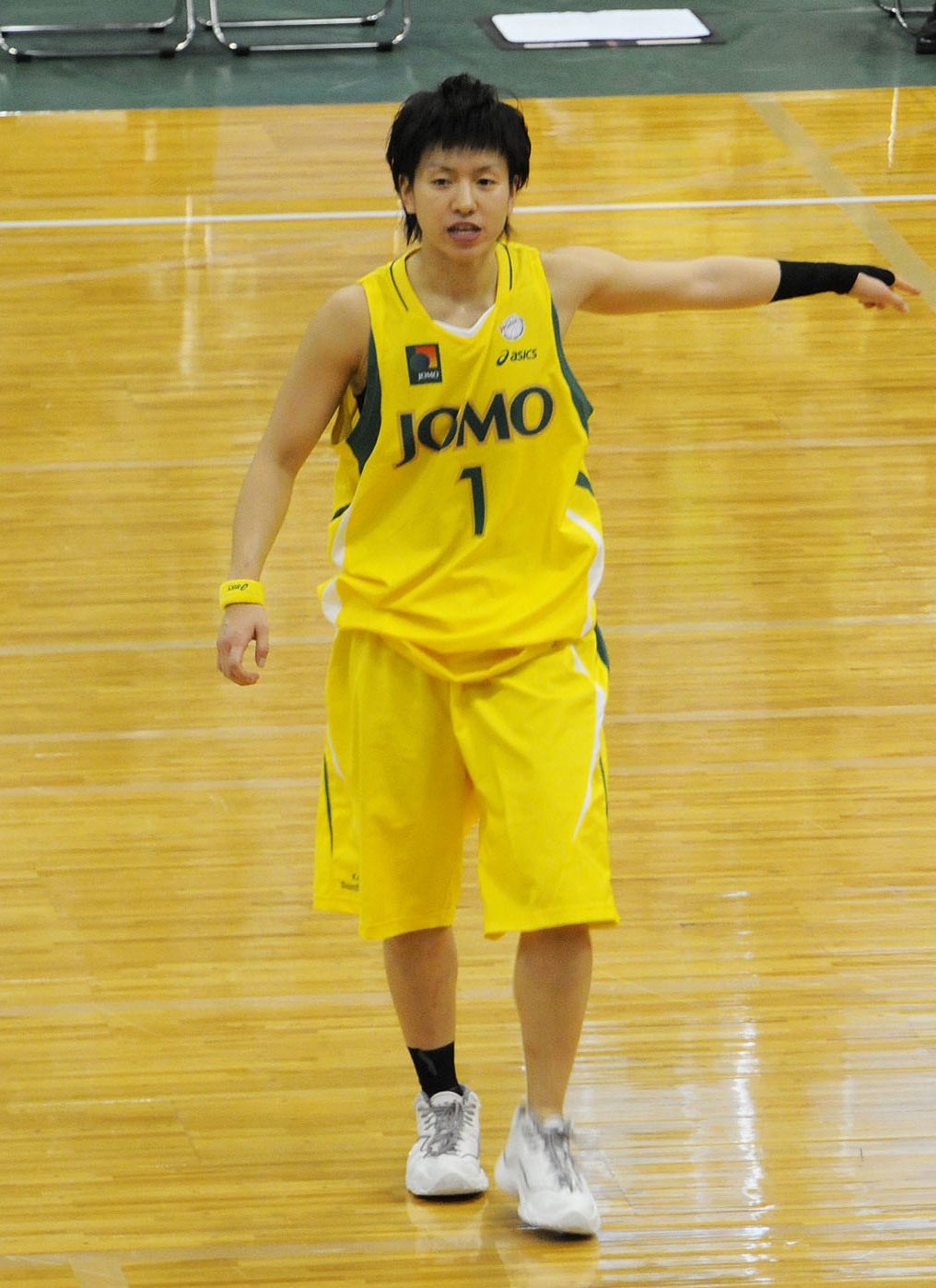

Toyota Antelopes
- Title: Assistant coach
- League: Women's Japan Basketball League, FIBA 3X3

Personal information
- Born: October 17, 1982 (age 44) Yamagata, Yamagata
- Listed height: 5 ft 7 in (1.70 m)
- Listed weight: 139 lb (63 kg)

Career information
- High school: Nagoya College High (Shōwa-ku, Nagoya)
- Playing career: 2001–2018
- Position: Point guard
- Coaching career: 2018–present

Career history

Playing
- 2001-08: JOMO Sunflowers
- 2008: Phoenix Mercury
- 2008-12: JX-Eneos Sunflowers
- 2013-14: Shanxi Flame
- 2015-18: Toyota Antelopes

Coaching
- 2018-19: Toyota Antelopes (Development)
- 2019-present: Toyota Antelopes (asst)
- 2018-present: Japan women's national 3x3 team (Support)

Career highlights
- 2x Japanese High School Champion; 2x National Sports Festival Champion; 2x Winter Cup Champion; 9x WJBL Champion; WJBL Regular Season MVP; 6x WJBL Best Five; 3x WJBL All-Star; 7x Empress Cup Champion; 8x Empress Cup Best Five; 2010 FIBA World Championship for Women Scoring Leader; Women's Chinese Basketball Association Champion
- Stats at Basketball Reference
Medals
Women's basketball
Representing Japan
Asian Games
Bronze medal – third place	2006 Doha	Team competition
Bronze medal – third place	2010 Guangzhou	Team competition
FIBA Women's Asia Cup
Silver medal – second place	2001 Bangkok	Japan
Bronze medal – third place	2007 Incheon	Japan
Bronze medal – third place	2009 Chennai	Japan
Bronze medal – third place	2011 Omura	Japan
Gold medal – first place	2013 Bangkok	Japan
Basketball coaching
Representing Japan
FIBA 3x3 Under-23 World Cup
Silver medal – second place	2018 Xi'an	Japan 3x3
Gold medal – first place	2019 Lanzhou	Japan 3x3
FIBA 3x3 Women's Series
Silver medal – second place	2019 Chengdu	Japan 3x3
Gold medal – first place	2019 Xiong An	Japan 3x3
Bronze medal – third place	2019 Tokyo	Japan 3x3
Silver medal – second place	2019 Montreal	Japan 3x3

Yuko Oga (大神 雄子, Ōga Yūko; born October 17, 1982 in Yamagata city) is a Japanese basketball coach and former professional basketball player who is the head coach for the Toyota Antelopes of the Women's Japan Basketball League (WJBL). A point guard, Oga played for the JX Sunflowers in the Women's Japan Basketball League and the Phoenix Mercury in the WNBA. In 2023, she was inducted into the FIBA basketball Hall of Fame. Her nickname is Shin.

== Professional career ==
She started playing basketball influenced by her father who was a basketball coach at Yamagata University. She was educated at, and played for, Nagoya College High School (currently Ōka Gakuen High School). While there, she helped the school win 7 national titles. After graduating in 2001, she joined the Japan Energy basketball club (later renamed the JOMO Sunflowers, and then the JX-Eneos Sunflowers ). In the same year, she received her first call-up for the national team.

Oga played for Japan Energy throughout several name changes, Japan Energy from 2001–04, JOMO Sunflowers from 2004–10, JX-Eneos Sunflowers from 2010-13.

For the 2013-14 season, Oga made a move to China, to play for the Shanxi Flame, which won the championship that season.

For the 2015 season she returned to Japan, signing with the Toyota Antelopes, where she played until her retirement in 2018.

In 2007, she became the first Japanese female player to sign a professional contract in the domestic leagues. In 2008, she signed a training camp contract with Phoenix Mercury. The club announced on May 16, 2008, that she had made the opening day roster. She is the second Japanese player to play in the WNBA after Mikiko Hagiwara who also played for the Mercury from 1997 to 1998. She recorded 4 points and 1 assist in her WNBA debut on May 17, 2008, in the season opener, a 94–99 loss against the Los Angeles Sparks.

== International career ==
Between 2001 and 2013, Oga represented Japan at seven FIBA Women's Asia Cup tournaments, winning Gold at the 2013 tournament in Bangkok, Silver at the 2001 tournament, also in Bangkok, and Bronze at the 2007, 2009, and 2011 tournaments, in Incheon, Chennai, and Omura respectively.

In 2004, she represented Japan at the 2004 Summer Olympics in Athens and became the youngest Japanese female basketball player at the Olympics ever.

Oga represented Japan at the 2010 FIBA Women's Basketball World Cup. While Japan only finished tenth, Oga was the high scorer for the tournament, averaging 19 points a game.

== Coaching career ==
Oga moved to coaching in 2018 after retiring from professional play. She has been coaching for the Toyota Antelopes in the Japanese W-League, and has coached the Japanese 3x3 basketball team.
