= Geethu Anna Jose =

Indian basketball player

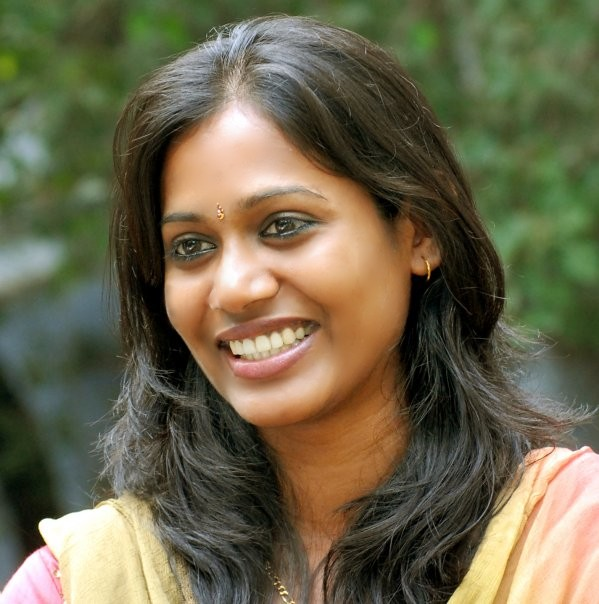

International Basketball Player Arjuna Awardee Only Indian Female To Ever Get Selected For WNBA USA Tryouts &(Southern Railway Team)
- Position: Center

Personal information
- Born: 30 June 1985 (age 41) Changanasserry, Kottayam, India
- Listed height: 6 ft 2 in (1.88 m)

Career information
- Playing career: 2004 (International); 2002 (Junior International)–present

Geethu Anna Jose (born 30 June 1985 in Kollad, Kottayam, Kerala, India) is an Indian basketball player who has been the captain of the India women's national basketball team.

== Personal life ==
Jose was born in a Syro-Malabar Catholic Nasrani family that had little history of basketball playing. She was educated at Kottayam's Mount Carmel English Medium School, and at Assumption College, Changanacherry. Her brother Tom Jose is also a basketball player who represented the State of Kerala. Jose married Rahul Koshy on 8 January 2014. They have a son and a daughter.

== Career ==
As a child, Jose played volleyball, first playing basketball with the Kerala Junior Basketball Association. While playing in a championship match for Kerala, she was spotted by the Southern Railway basketball team; she joined Southern Railway in 2003.

Jose, who is 6 ft 2in tall (188 cm) played in the 2006 to 2008 Australian Big V seasons for the Ringwood Hawks, being the first Indian woman basketball player to play for an Australia club as a professional. In the 2008/9 season she was invited to play for Dandenong in the Australian Women's National Basketball League, but didn't take up the offer. In April 2011 WNBA teams, Chicago Sky, Los Angeles Sparks, and San Antonio Silver Stars invited her for tryouts. In June 2012, Jose scored 11 points in the finals of the third Asian Beach Games at Haiyang, helping India to achieve a 17–14 victory over China.

== Sporting credits ==
=== International ===
- 2002: Junior ABC in Chinese Taipei
- 2004: Senior ABC, Japan
- 2004: Invitation Tournament in Malaysia
- 2004-8: represented Indian Railways basketball team, winning 5 Senior Nationals
- 2005: silver medal in 20th Asian Basketball Confederation Championship for Senior Women, Sendai, Japan
- 2005: played in the Invitation Tournament at Phuket, with awards for MVP, best player, top scorer, top rebounder and also the Most Popular Player Award
- 2006: The Most Valuable Player Award and top scorer, rebounder and best shot-blocker prizes in the Melbourne (Australia) Commonwealth Games
- 2006: played in a friendly-match series at Auckland, New Zealand
- 2006: professional league player for the Australian Ringwood Hawks Club, Melbourne, Australia, receiving the Player of the month Award for July
- 2006: gold medal in the First Phuket International Invitational Basketball Championship, Thailand; awards for MVP, best player, top scorer, top rebounder, and most popular player.
- 2007: Australian League July Player of the Month Award
- 2007: winner in Pool-B at FIBA Asia Championship for Women, Incheon, South Korea
- 2008: selected for the WNBL
- 2008: Australian Most Valuable player of the Year
- 2009: silver medal for 3-on-3 basketball contest; Asian Indoor Games, Vietnam
- 2009: captain of the Indian Team at the FIBA Asian Basketball Championship for Senior women at Chennai
- 2009: top scorer for ABC, Chennai

=== Indian ===
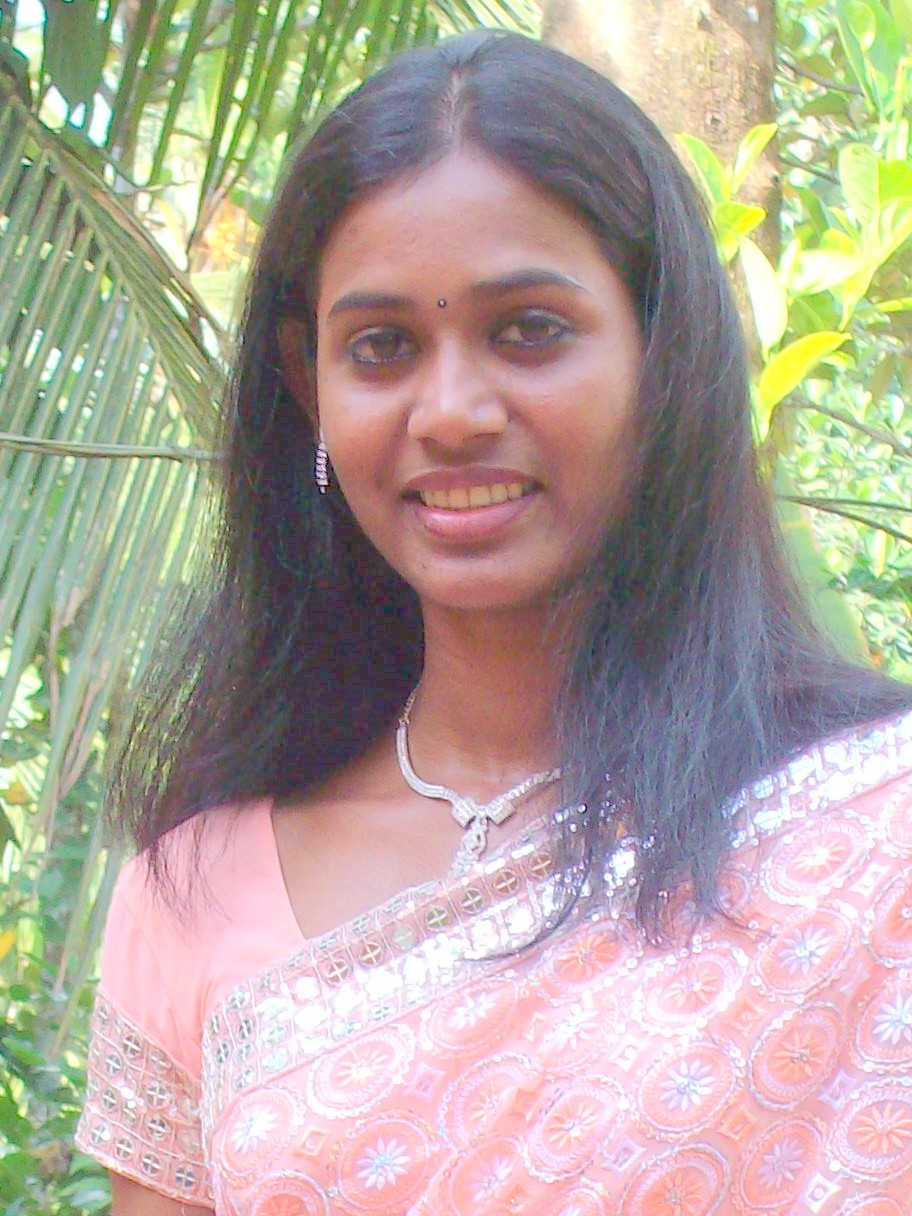
Geethu Anna Jose

Geethu received Arjuna Award the year 2014–15 for her outstanding contributions towards sport in India and International arena

- 2000 Youth championship at M.P (Kerala team)
- 2001: Junior nationals (Goa)
- 2003: Junior nationals (Punjab)
- 2003: Senior Nationals (Hyderabad)
- 2004/5: represented the Indian Railways winning team in the 55th Senior Nationals competition (Ludhiana)
- 2005/6: represented the Indian Railways winning team in the 56th Senior Nationals competition (Pune)
- 2006/7: represented the Indian Railways winning team in the 57th Senior Nationals competition (Jaipur)
- 2007: represented the Indian Railways winning team in the 58th Senior Nationals competition (Puducherry)
- 2008/9: represented the Indian Railways team in the 59th Senior Nationals competition (Surat)
- 2009/10: represented the Indian Railways winning team in the 60th Senior Nationals competition (Ludhiana)
- 2003: represented Inter Railways team in the 27th All India Railway Basketball championship (Varanasi)
- 2004: represented Inter Railways winning team in the 28th All India Railway Basketball championship (Lucknow)
- 2005: represented Inter Railways team in the 29th All India Railway Basketball championship (Gorakhpur)
- 2006: represented Inter Railways winning team in the 30th All India Railway Basketball championship (Guwahati)
- 2007: represented Inter Railways winning team in the 31st All India Railway Basketball championship (Chennai)
- 2008: represented Inter Railways team in the 32nd All India Railway Basketball championship (Guwahati)
- 2009: represented Inter Railways winning team in the 33rd All India Railway Basketball championship (Jabalpur)
- 2005 represented the winning Southern Railway team in the 21st Federation Cup (Bhavnagar)
- 2007: represented the Southern Railway team in the 23rd Federation Cup (Rourkela)
