= Miao Lijie =

Chinese basketball player

Personal information
- Born: June 3, 1981 (age 45) Harbin, Heilongjiang, China
- Listed height: 178 cm (5 ft 10 in)
- Listed weight: 75 kg (165 lb)
- Position: Point guard
- Number: 8

Career history
- 2005: Sacramento Monarchs
- Stats at Basketball Reference
- FIBA Hall of Fame
Medals
Women's basketball
Representing China
Asian Games
Silver medal – second place	1998 Bangkok	Team competition
Gold medal – first place	2002 Busan	Team competition
Gold medal – first place	2006 Doha	Team competition
Gold medal – first place	2010 Guangzhou	Team competition

Miao Lijie (Chinese: 苗立杰; pinyin: Miáo Lìjié, born June 3, 1981, in Harbin, Heilongjiang) is a female Chinese basketball player.

She has been the first player to score 6.000 points in the WCBA, and the only Chinese player able to win both the WCBA and the WNBA title.

She first played basketball at Hualong, joining the ranks at age 11. At age 16, Miao was selected to join the Chinese National team, being part of the squad that won the gold medal at the 2001 Asian Championship.

In 2005, she joined the Sacramento Monarchs of WNBA but left the team after a short time. She would get a WCBA title in 2011, playing for Shenyang.

She competed at the 2004 Summer Olympics in Athens, the 2008 Summer Olympics in Beijing, and the 2012 Summer Olympics in London.

Miao retired in 2014, at age 33. She then became the head coach of Shen Bu team, which would be merged with Bayi Women's Basketball Team.

== Career statistics ==
Legend
GP	Games played	GS	Games started	MPG	Minutes per game	RPG	Rebounds per game
APG	Assists per game	SPG	Steals per game	BPG	Blocks per game	PPG	Points per game
TO	Turnovers per game	FG%	Field-goal percentage	3P%	3-point field-goal percentage	FT%	Free-throw percentage
**Bold**	Career best	°	League leader

=== WNBA ===
==== Regular season ====
WNBA regular season statistics
Year	Team	GP	GS	MPG	FG%	3P%	FT%	RPG	APG	SPG	BPG	TO	PPG
2005	Sacramento	18	0	7.5	.300	.300	1.000	0.2	0.7	0.3	0.1	0.8	1.7
**Career**	1 year, 1 team	18	0	7.5	.300	.300	1.000	0.2	0.7	0.3	0.1	0.8	1.7
