= Anitha Pauldurai =

Indian basketball player

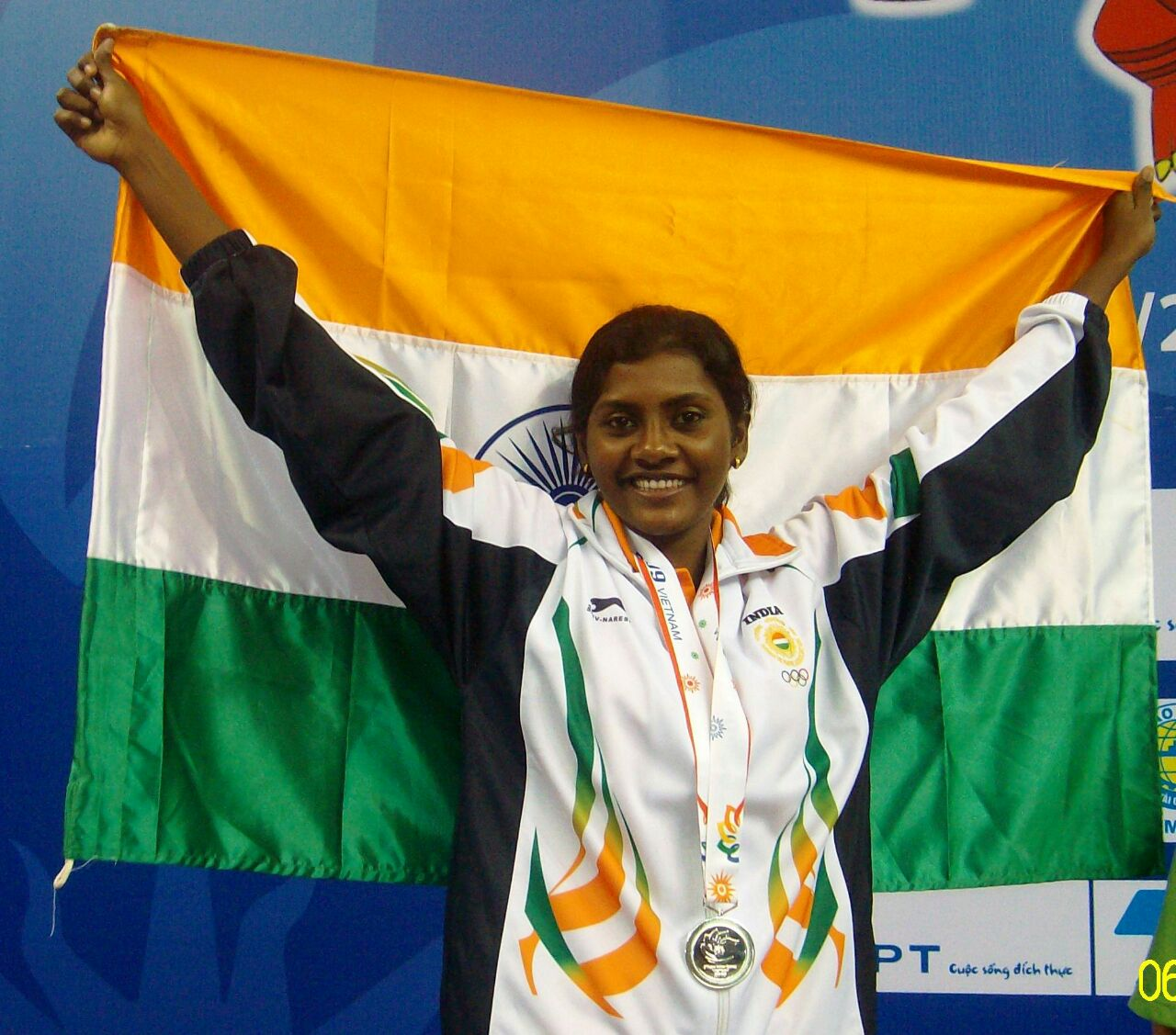

Personal information
- Born: 22 June 1985 (age 41) Madras (now Chennai), Tamil Nadu, India
- Listed height: 167 cm (5 ft 6 in)

Career information
- Playing career: International: 2001–2018
- Position: Southern Railways (Officer On Special Duty)

Career highlights
- Padma Shri (2021)

Anitha Pauldurai (born 22 June 1985) is an Indian basketball player from Tamil Nadu. She was the captain of the India women's national basketball team for eight years after making her senior India debut in 2000. She has been conferred with National Civilian Award Padma Shri in 2021. She has been also conferred with Chief Minister State Award in the field of sports by Government of Tamil Nadu in 2013.

== Early life and education ==
Pauldurai was born in a middle class Tamil family to late police constable G. Pauldurai and housewife Lalitha in Madras (now Chennai), Tamil Nadu. She did her schooling at St. Antony's Higher Secondary School in Santhome and Lady Sivaswamy Ayyar Girls’ Higher Secondary School in Mylapore. She did her B.Com.at Madras University and later did MBA (HRM) from Annamalai University. She joined Southern Railway 2003, and worked as Officer on Special Duty, Ticket Checking. In 2021, she became a Chief Welfare Inspector (Sports). N Sampath was one of her early coaches at the Rising Star Club.

== Career ==
Pauldurai played for 18 years in the Indian women's national team (2000 to 2017). She is the first Indian woman who played nine Asian Basketball Confederation (ABC) championships continuously representing the national squad. Anitha has a record of 30 medals in national championships.

She was also the youngest to captain the Senior National Team at the age of 19 at the FIBA Asia Championship in China. She went on to captain the national team for eight years. In August 2012, she was selected to play for an international women professional league in Thailand.

She played a number of international tournaments including big-ticket events such as the Asian championship, Commonwealth Games 2006 and Asian Games 2010. She won the gold medal in 1st 3x3 FIBA Asian Basketball Championships at Doha 2013. She was also part of the team that won gold medal in 3rd Asian Beach games at Haiyan, China 2012. She was captain and provided top assists in the tournament where India won gold medal in south Asian Beach games at Sri Lanka in 2011 and silver medal in Asian indoor games at Vietnam 2009.

She was employed with Indian Railways and in domestic events, she played for Southern Railways. Even in November 2022, she represented Tamil Nadu that won the Federation Cup at Bengaluru.

== Coaching career ==
In October 2017, she was named as the assistant coach for the Indian under 16 team, after nearly 18 years of her playing career.

== Awards and achievements ==
- Padma Shri Award for Sports in 2021 - Fourth Highest Civilian Award in India.
- Lifetime Achievement Award from the Chief Minister of Tamil Nadu in senior National Basketball Championship at Chennai 2018.
- Chief Minister State Sports Award 2013.

Apart from these top awards, she received many other honours including FEMINA Super Daughter Award 2021, Tamil Nadu Women achiever Award from the Brand Republic 2021, Life Time Achievement Award from Rotary Club Chennai Velachery 2021, Sports Women of the Year Award from Jeppiaar Institute of Technology 2021, Raindrops Women Achiever Award 2021, Best Sports Women Award from TN World Women Wing 2021, Wonder Women Award from Virisha Book of World Record 2021, Women Achiever Award from State Bank Of India 2019, Villayatu Ratna Award from News7 channel Tamil Ratna Awards 2018, Received Doctor of Letters (D.LITT) from DK International Research Foundation 2018, Women Achiever Award from Rajalakshmi Engineering College 2018, Young Achiever Award from International Youth Fest 2018, Women Achiever Award from Vels University 2017, Vikadan award for Golden Captain 2016, Top Plays of the Tournament 2013 FIBA Asian Women, Southern Railway General Manager's Railway Week Award for sports 2008, Best Player Award in 17th Youth Nationals at Vashi 2001 and she also received Book of World Records certificate for contribution towards the basketball sport in India.

== International sporting achievements ==
Year	Competition	Venue & dates	Position	Notes
Representing India				
2017	FIBA U-16 Women's Asia Championship	Bengaluru 22 to 28 October	Winner	Asst coach
			Level II	
2017	FIBA Women's Asia Cup Division B	Bengaluru 23 to 29 July	Winner	Captain
			Level II	
	39th William Jones Cup	Chinese Taipei 5 to 9 July	Top 4	Captain
2015	26th FIBA Asia Championship for Senior Women	Wuhanchina 29 Aug to 5 Sep	Top 6	Captain
	1st FIBA Asia 3 On 3 Championship	Dhoha, Qatar 15 to 16 May	Gold medal	
2013	25th FIBA Asia Championship for Senior Women	Bangkok, Thailand 27 Oct to 3 Nov	Top 5	
	3rd Asian Beach Games	Haiyang, China 16 to 22 June	Gold medal	Captain Top Assist
	Women's Professional Basketball League	Thailand July		Sripatum
2012				University
	34th William Jones Cup Tournament	Taiwan 7 to 11 June	Top 4	
	1st South Asian Beach Games	Hambantota	Gold medal	
		Sri Lanka 8 to 14 Aug		
2011	24th FIBA Asia Championship for Senior Women	Nagasaki	Top 5	Top Steal
		Japan 21 to 28 Aug		
	33rd William Jones Cup for Women	Chinese Taipai 31 July to 4 Aug	Top 4	
2010	16th Asian Games	China		
		Guangzhou 12 to 27 Nov		
	3rd Asian Indoor Games	Vietnam 30 Oct to 8 Nov	Silver medal	
2009	24th FIBA Asia Championship for Senior Women	Chennai		Captain
		17 to 24 Sep		
2007	22nd FIBA Asia Championship for Senior Women	Incheon, Korea 3 to 10 June	Winner	
			Levelii	
	Common Wealth Games	Melbourne, Australia 15 to 26 Mar		Top Assist of Tournament
2006	Four Nations International Basketball Tournament	Auckland, New Zealand 8 to 12 Mar		
	1st Phuket International Invitational Tournament	Thailand 22 to 25 Sep	Gold medal	
2005	21st FIBA Asia championship for Senior Women	Ginhuangdao, China 19 to 26 June		Captain
				(Youngest ever captain)
	International Invitational Basketball Tournament	Malaysia	Silver medal	
2004		20 to 30 June		
	20th FIBA Asia Championship for Senior Women	Japan		
		13 to 19 Jan		
2001	19th FIBA Asia Championship for Senior Women	Bangkok		
		Thailand 4 to 11 Oct		
2000	Junior FIBA Asia Basketball Championship for Women	Delhi		
		16 to 22 Dec		

== National sporting achievements ==
Year	Competition	Venue & dates	Position	Notes
				Life Time Achievement Award received from Chief Minister of Tamil Nadu
2018	68th Senior National Basketball Championship	Chennai	Gold medal	
		17 to 24 Jan		
	67th Senior National Basketball Championship	Pondicherry	Bronze	
		7 to 14 Jan		
2017	Federation Cup	Coimbatore	Silver	
	41st All India Railway Championship	Kolkata 10 to 15 Nov	Gold	
	66th Senior National Basketball Championship	Mysore 9 to 16 Jan	Gold	
2016	40th All India Railway Championship	Secundrabad 25 to 30 Nov	Silver	
	35th National Games	Kerala 1 to 14 Feb	Silver	
2015	29th Federation Cup	Pune 29 Mar to 2 Apr	Gold	
	39th All India Railway Championship	Mumbai 20 to 26 Nov	Gold	
	1st 3 On 3 Senior National Basketball Championship	New Delhi 10 & 11 April	Gold	
		Bengaluru 30 Jan to 3 Feb		Captain Most Valuable Player
2013	27th Federation Cup		Gold	
	37th All India Railway Championship	Kapurthala 6 to 10 Nov	Gold	
	67th Senior National Basketball Championship	Ludhiana 20 Dec to 4 Jan	Gold	
	26th Federation Cup	Cochin 14 to 18 Mar	Gold	
2012	36th All India Railway Championship	Guwahati 1 to 8 Nov	Gold	
	62nd Senior National Basketball Championship	Chennai 16 to 24 Dec	Gold	
	34th National Games	Jharkhand 12 to 26 Feb	Gold	Captain
	25th Federation Cup	Raipur 10 To 15 Feb	Silver	
2011	35th All India Railway Championship	Kapurthala 4 to 11 Nov	Silver	
	61st Senior National Basketball Championship	New Delhi 20 Dec to 4 Jan	Gold	
	34th All India Railway Championship	Secundrabad 26 Nov to 3 Dec	Gold	
2010	51st South Zone Basketball Championship	Visakhapatnam 23 to 27 June	Gold	Captain
	60th Senior National Basketball Championship	Ludhiana 27 Dec to 3 Jan	Gold	Captain Top Scorer Award
2009	33rd All India Railway Championship	Jabalpur 6 to 12 Oct	Gold	
	59th Senior National Basketball Championship	Surat 31 Dec to 7 Jan	Gold	
	32nd All India Railway Championship	Guwahati 3 to 9 Sep	Bronze	
2008	50th South Zone Basketball Championship	Hospet 18 to 22 Oct	Gold	Captain
	58th Senior National Basketball Championship	Pondicherry 21 to 28 Dec	Gold	
	23rd Federation Cup	Rourekela 31 Oct to 4 Nov	Silver	Captain
2007				
	31st All India Railway Championship	Chennai 20 to 26 Nov	Gold	Captain
	56thsenior National Basketball Championship	Pune 20 Dec to 4 Jan 2006	Gold	
	21st Federation Cup	Bhavnagar 15 to 19 Feb	Silver	
	29th All India Railway Championship	Gorakpur 19 to 22 Oct	Silver	
2005	R. Vaikuntam Cup	New Delhi 12 to 14 July	Bronze	
	55th Senior National Basketball Championship	Ludhiana 26 Dec to 2 Jan	Gold	
2004				
	28th All India Railway Championship	Lucknow 1 to 8 Nov	Gold	
	54th Senior National Basketball Championship	Cuttack 26 Dec 2003 to 2 Jan 2004	Gold	
	45th South Zone Basketball Championship	Yanam 18 to 22 July	Gold	
	27th All India Railway Championship	Varanasi 5 to 12 Nov	Bronze	
2003	54th Junior Nationals	Ludhiyana 7 to 14 June	-	
	53rd Senior National Basketball Championship	Hyderabad 25 Jan to 1 Feb		
2002	53rd Junior Nationals	Goa 10 to 17 May		
	51st Senior National Basketball Championship	Bengaluru 5 to 12 Jan	Bronze	
	31st National Games	Punjab 19 Nov to 1 Dec	Silver	
	52nd Junior Nationals	Bhilai 17 to 24 June	-	
2001	18th Youth Nationals	Madhya Pradhesh 14 to 20 Oct	Gold	Captain
	50th Senior National Basketball Championship	Delhi 25 Dec to 1 Jan 2000	Bronze	
2000	17th Federation Cup	Vishakapatnam 25 to 30 July	Forth	
	51st Junior Nationals	Himachal Pradesh 9 to 15 Sep	Bronze	
	17th Youth Nationals	Vashi 25 Dec to 1 Jan 2001	Gold	Captain Most Valuable Player
	50th Junior Nationals	Pondicherry 21 to 27 May	Gold	
	16th Youth Nationals	Chittoragarh 8 to 13 Dec	Silver	
1999	15th Youth Nationals	Surat 23 to 29 Jan		
	25th Sub-Junior National	Pondicherry 14 to 18 May	-	
1998	XLIV National School Games	Chandigarh 14 to 19 Nov		

== See also ==
- India women's national basketball team
