= 2002 FIBA World Championship for Women squads =

The 2002 FIBA World Championship for Women squads were the squads of the 2002 FIBA World Championship for Women, which was held in China between September 14–25.. Each one of the 16 teams at the tournament selected a squad of 12 players.

== Group A ==
=== Argentina ===
Head Coach: (Argentina) Eduardo Pinto

No.	Pos.	Name	Year Born
4	G	Laura Betiana Nicolini	1975
5	–	Vanesa Ivana Pires	1980
6	–	Vanesa Carina Avaro	1972
7	C	Gisela Veronica Vega	1982
8	–	Noelia Elizabeth Mendoza	1979
9	G	Natalia Romina Rios	1980
10	–	Andrea Veronica Gale	1973
11	–	Marcela Paoletta	1979
12	C	Maria Alejandra Fernandez	1976
13	–	Alejandra Ethel Chesta	1982
14	C	Erica Sanchez Iragorre	1976
15	–	Laura Mariana Falabella	1971

=== Australia ===
Head coach: (Australia) Jan Stirling

No.	Pos.	Name	Year Born
4	G	Jae Kingi	1976
5	G	Allison Tranquilli	1972
6	G	Sandra Brondello	1968
7	F	Penny Taylor	1981
8	C	Suzy Batkovic	1980
9	F	Trisha Dykstra	1972
10	G	Kristi Willoughby	1975
11	F	Lauren Jackson	1981
12	–	Hollie Grima	1983
13	C	Jennifer Whittle	1973
14	PF	Laura Hodges	1983
15	F	Michelle Brogan	1973

=== Japan ===
No.	Pos.	Name	Year Born
4	C	Noriko Koiso	1974
5	G	Akemi Okazato	1974
6	G	Taeko Oyama	1974
7	F	Ryoko Yano	1978
8	F	Hiromi Kawabata	1979
9	G	Kaori Kawakami	1974
10	G	Masami Tachikawa	1980
11	–	Ryoko Horibe	1976
12	–	Atsuko Watanabe	1978
13	–	Kumiko Yamada	1979
14	C	Naomi Yashiro	1977
15	F	Mutsuko Nagata	1976

=== Spain ===
Head coach: (Spain) Vicente Rodríguez

No.	Pos.	Name	Year Born
4	G	Maria-Begona Garcia Pinero	1976
5	G	Rosaura Del Carmen Sanchez Lujan	1974
6	PG	Laia Palau	1979
7	C	Marta Zurro Alfonso	1980
8	G	Marta Fernández	1981
9	F	Amaya Valdemoro	1976
10	G	Lidia Mirchandani Villar	1976
11	SG	Isabel Sanchez Fernandez	1976
12	C	Ingrid Pons Molina	1975
13	F	Marina Ferragut Castillo	1972
14	C	Elisabeth Cebrian Scheurer	1971
15	C	Maria Lucila Pascua Suarez	1983

== Group B ==
=== Brazil ===
No.	Pos.	Name	Year Born
4	PG	Claudia Maria Neves	1975
5	G	Helen Luz	1972
6	F	Adriana Aparecida Dos Santos	1971
7	G	Adriana Moisés	1978
8	F	Iziane Castro	1982
9	F	Janeth Dos Santos Arcain	1969
11	C	Erika De Souza	1982
12	G	Silvia Andrea Santos Luz	1975
13	C	Alessandra Oliveira	1973
14	C	Cintia Silva Dos Santos	1975
15	C	Kelly Santos	1979

=== China ===
Head coach: (China) Gong Luming

No.	Pos.	Name	Year Born
4	G	Xiaoyun Song	1982
5	G	Hanlan Zhang	1973
6	G	Wei Pan	1978
7	F	Bo Miao	1975
8	F	Lijie Miao	1981
9	F	Lei Ren	1982
10	F	Feifei Sui	1979
11	–	Jianhong Ding	1983
12	C	Luyun Chen	1977
13	C	Xiaoni Zhang	1983
14	–	Xiaoli Chen	1982
15	C	Nan Chen	1983

=== Senegal ===
No.	Pos.	Name	Year Born
4	–	Fatou Ndiaye Balayara	1980
5	G	Ndialou Paye	1974
6	–	Oumou Dia	1980
7	F	Awa Gueye	1978
8	G	Mboricka Fall	1970
9	C	Khardiata Diop	1971
10	C	Ndeye Ndiaye	1979
11	C	Bineta Diouf	1978
12	–	Fama Fall	1974
13	–	Bandegne Diop	1979
14	C	Astou Ndiaye	1973
15	–	Fatou Kiné Ndiaye	1977

=== (Socialist Federal Republic of Yugoslavia) Yugoslavia ===
Head coach: (Socialist Federal Republic of Yugoslavia) Miodrag Vesković

No.	Pos.	Name	Year Born
4	G	Gordana Bogojević	1974
5	F	Ana Joković	1979
6	PG	Jelena Škerović	1980
7	F	Lara Mandić	1974
8	–	Monika Veselovski	1977
9	G	Biljana Stanković	1974
10	C	Hajdana Radunović	1978
11	C	Milka Bjelica	1981
12	F	Ljubica Drljača	1978
13	C	Daliborka Vilipić	1975
14	G	Nataša Anđelić	1977
15	–	Ivanka Matić	1979

== Group C ==
=== Chinese Taipei ===
No.	Pos.	Name	Year Born
4	F	Yung-Hsu Chu	1981
5	–	Wei-Chuan Chien	1971
6	–	Feng-Chung Chiang	1981
7	–	Ya-Hui Mai	1977
8	–	Pi-Feng Chao	1977
9	–	Shiau-Jie Huang	1977
10	F	Hui-Yin Chang	1974
11	C	Hui-Yun Cheng	1977
12	–	Pei-Ying Tsai	1976
14	–	Yi-Ju Chen	1978
15	–	Chun-Yi Liu	1981
16	–	Chi-Wen Lin	1983

=== Lithuania ===
Head coach: (Lithuania) Vydas Gedvilas

No.	Pos.	Name	Year Born
4	PG	Rasa Žemantauskaitė	1981
5	G	Lina Brazdeikyte	1974
6	C	Eglė Šulčiūtė	1985
7	PG	Sandra Linkevičienė	1982
8	F	Agne Abromaite	1979
9	–	Rasa Kreivyte	1967
10	G	Ilona Nikonovaite	1975
11	C	Irena Vizbariene	1977
12	F	Vita Kuktienė	1980
13	F	Lina Dambrauskaite	1968
14	–	Ausra Naideniene	1973
15	C	Iveta Salkauske	1982

=== Russia ===
No.	Pos.	Name	Year Born
4	–	Vera Shnyukova	1979
5	G	Oxana Rakhmatulina	1976
6	F	Olga Arteshina	1982
7	G	Anna Arkhipova	1973
8	F	Elena Baranova	1972
9	F	Ioulia Skopa	1978
10	G	Ilona Korstin	1980
11	F	Irina Osipova	1981
12	C	Maria Kalmykova	1978
13	C	Oxana Zakalyuzhnaya	1977
14	C	Tatiana Shchegoleva	1982
15	G	Diana Goustilina	1974

=== United States ===
Head coach: (United States) Van Chancellor

No.	Pos.	Name	Year Born
4	G	Shannon Johnson	1974
5	G	Dawn Staley	1970
6	G	Sue Bird	1980
7	F	Sheryl Swoopes	1971
8	C	DeLisha Milton-Jones	1974
9	C	Lisa Leslie	1972
10	F	Tamika Catchings	1979
11	–	Tamecka Dixon	1975
12	F	Natalie Williams	1970
13	–	Jennifer Gillom	1964
14	G	Katie Smith	1974
15	–	Tari Phillips	1969

== Group D ==
=== Cuba ===
No.	Pos.	Name	Year Born
4	C	Lisdeivi Victores Pompa	1974
5	F	Taimara Suero Coronado	1979
6	C	Yakelyn Plutín Tizon	1979
7	F	Zuleira Aties Isaac	1980
8	F	Yulizeny Soria Baró	1979
9	C	Judith Aguila Hernández	1972
10	G	María Elena León Molinet	1967
11	C	Yamile Martinez Calderón	1970
12	F	Milaisy Duanys Céspedes	1979
13	G	Licet Castillo Iglesias	1973
14	G	Cariola Hechavarría García	1976
15	C	Milaida Enriquez Parrado	1969

=== France ===
No.	Pos.	Name	Year Born
4	G	Laure Savasta	1974
5	F	Sandra Le Dréan	1977
6	F	Catherine Melain	1974
7	G	Edwige Lawson-Wade	1979
8	G	Yannick Souvré	1969
9	F	Audrey Sauret Gillespie	1976
10	C	Nathalie Roselyne Lesdema	1973
11	–	Lucienne Berthieu	1978
12	C	Dominique Tonnerre	1974
13	C	Sandra Marcelle Dijon	1976
14	C	Laétitia Moussard	1971
15	C	Nicole Antibe	1974

=== South Korea ===
No.	Pos.	Name	Year Born
4	G	Yeong-Ok Kim	1974
5	G	Joo Weon Chun	1972
6	G	Ji Yoon Kim	1976
7	G	Eun-Ju Lee	1977
8	F	Sun-Hyoung Jang	1975
9	G	Mi Sun Lee	1979
10	F	Yeon Ha Beon	1980
11	F	Jung Eun Park	1977
12	C	Hyun-Hee Hong	1982
13	C	Jong Ae Lee	1975
14	C	Sunmin Jung	1974
15	C	Kwe Ryong Kim	1979

=== Tunisia ===
No.	Pos.	Name	Year Born
4	–	Mariem Zbidi	1980
5	–	Maherzia Ksouri Sbeii	1983
6	–	Fatma Zagrouba	1982
7	–	Kaouther Abid	1968
8	–	Maha Chelly	1982
9	–	Aida Soltani	1983
10	–	Karima Oueslati	1977
11	–	Fatma Barkallah	1974
12	–	Faiza Soudani	1978
13	–	Mouna Khriji	1976
14	–	Henda Chebli	1981
15	–	Imen Ben Othmane	1977
