= Basketball at the 2002 Asian Games – Women's tournament =

Women at the 2002 Asian Games
- Venue: Geumjeong Gymnasium; Sajik Arena
- Date: 3–14 October 2002
- Competitors: 72 from 6 nations

Medalists
gold medal	China
silver medal	South Korea
bronze medal	Chinese Taipei

Women's basketball at the 2002 Asian Games was held in Geumjeong Gymnasium and Sajik Arena, Busan from October 3 to October 14, 2002.

== Squads ==
China	Chinese Taipei	Japan	Malaysia
Song Xiaoyun; Zhang Hanlan; Pan Wei; Miao Bo; Miao Lijie; Ren Lei; Sui Feifei; Liu Xiaohong; Chen Luyun; Zhang Xiaoni; Chen Xiaoli; Chen Nan	Chu Yung-hsu; Chien Wei-chuan; Chiang Feng-chun; Mai Ya-hui; Chao Pi-feng; Huang Shiau-jie; Chang Hui-yin; Cheng Hui-yun; Tsai Pei-ying; Tang Su-tuan; Chen Yi-ju; Liu Chun-yi	Noriko Hamaguchi; Akemi Okazato; Taeko Oyama; Ryoko Yano; Hiromi Kawabata; Kaori Kawakami; Masami Tachikawa; Ryoko Horibe; Atsuko Watanabe; Kumiko Yamada; Naomi Yashiro; Mutsuko Nagata	Loke Miaw See; Tai Lee San; Choo Seck Yun; Low Bee Chuan; Yoong Sze Yuin; Low Meei Hun; Chow Siao Foong; Kew Suik May; Beh Siew Lian; Bong Yik Kee; Chew Yong Yong; Tie Pick Ing
South Korea	Uzbekistan		
Kim Yeong-ok; Chun Joo-weon; Kim Ji-yoon; Lee Eun-ju; Jang Sun-hyoung; Lee Mi-sun; Beon Yeon-ha; Park Jung-eun; Hong Hyun-hee; Lee Jong-ae; Jung Sun-min; Kim Kwe-ryong	Yuliya Kiseleva; Oksana Gubarkova; Nadejda Dmitrieva; Elena Kochurina; Ekaterina Zubankova; Viktoriya Shagan; Natalya Babusheva; Svetlana Shmarikova; Anna Reyngold; Tatyana Kildyusheva; Kristina Shatrova; Natalia Krestyanova		

== Results ==
All times are Korea Standard Time (UTC+09:00)

=== Preliminary round ===
Pos	Team	Pld	W	L	PF	PA	PD	Pts	Qualification
1	China	5	5	0	504	341	+163	10	Semifinals
2	South Korea	5	4	1	495	347	+148	9	Semifinals
3	Chinese Taipei	5	3	2	430	424	+6	8	Semifinals
4	Japan	5	2	3	443	436	+7	7	Semifinals
5	Uzbekistan	5	1	4	344	466	−122	6	
6	Malaysia	5	0	5	267	469	−202	5	

Source: Results

3 October
13:00

Japan	101–83	Uzbekistan
Scoring by quarter: 31–13, 25–20, 21–16, 24–34
Pts: Okazato 33; Rebs: Nagata 12; Asts: Kawakami 5		Pts: Shagan 22; Rebs: Dmitrieva 14; Asts: Kochurina, Shagan 2

Geumjeong Gymnasium, Busan

3 October
17:00

South Korea	115–85	Chinese Taipei
Scoring by quarter: 31–25, 29–15, 25–21, 30–24
Pts: Jung 22; Rebs: Jung 9 Asts: Jung 4		Pts: Chiang 26; Rebs: Chiang 8 Asts: Chien 2

Geumjeong Gymnasium, Busan

4 October
13:00

Uzbekistan	58–104	China
Scoring by quarter: 17–34, 22–20, 6–33, 13–17
Pts: Dmitrieva 17; Rebs: Dmitrieva 19; Asts: Zubankova 2		Pts: Chen N. 20; Rebs: Chen X. 9 Asts: Ren, Sui 3

Geumjeong Gymnasium, Busan

4 October
17:00

Malaysia	45–93	South Korea
Scoring by quarter: 12–25, 12–26, 9–21, 12–21
Pts: Chow 14; Rebs: Chow 10; Asts: Low M. 3		Pts: Kim K. 20; Rebs: Jung 8 Asts: Chun, Park 3

Geumjeong Gymnasium, Busan

5 October
13:00

China	100–87	Japan
Scoring by quarter: 21–16, 23–29, 33–27, 23–15
Pts: Sui 26; Rebs: Chen N. 9 Asts: Sui 3		Pts: Nagata 23; Rebs: Oyama 5 Asts: four players 1

Geumjeong Gymnasium, Busan

5 October
17:00

Chinese Taipei	84–60	Malaysia
Scoring by quarter: 23–19, 20–13, 23–14, 18–14
Pts: Chien, Chao 16; Rebs: Cheng 18; Asts: Chien 5		Pts: Chow 19; Rebs: Tai 9 Asts: Low B. 3

Geumjeong Gymnasium, Busan

6 October
13:00

Uzbekistan	61–86	Chinese Taipei
Scoring by quarter: 12–18, 12–20, 16–21, 21–27
Pts: Shagan 22; Rebs: Dmitrieva 13; Asts: Reyngold, Kildyusheva 1		Pts: Chiang 19; Rebs: Cheng 12; Asts: Mai 5

Geumjeong Gymnasium, Busan

6 October
17:00

Japan	72–93	South Korea
Scoring by quarter: 33–26, 16–20, 20–26, 3–21
Pts: Okazato 14; Rebs: Nagata 12; Asts: Oyama 3		Pts: Jung 23; Rebs: Jung 9 Asts: Jung 4

Geumjeong Gymnasium, Busan

7 October
13:00

Malaysia	53–108	China
Scoring by quarter: 22–21, 10–37, 11–23, 10–27
Pts: Tai, Low M. 15; Rebs: Tai, Kew 6 Asts: Kew 2		Pts: Miao L. 15; Rebs: Zhang X. 11; Asts: Miao L. 3

Geumjeong Gymnasium, Busan

7 October
17:00

South Korea	123–63	Uzbekistan
Scoring by quarter: 27–18, 34–16, 36–15, 26–14
Pts: Beon 20; Rebs: Jang 6 Asts: Jung 3		Pts: Shagan 17; Rebs: Dmitrieva 9 Asts: four players 1

Geumjeong Gymnasium, Busan

8 October
13:00

Uzbekistan	79–52	Malaysia
Scoring by quarter: 20–5, 17–18, 26–8, 16–21
Pts: Dmitrieva 24; Rebs: Dmitrieva 19; Asts: Shagan, Shmarikova, Reyngold 1		Pts: Choo 9 Rebs: Chow 7 Asts: Tai, Choo, Yoong 1

Geumjeong Gymnasium, Busan

8 October
17:00

Japan	78–103	Chinese Taipei
Scoring by quarter: 23–18, 24–28, 15–31, 16–26
Pts: Hamaguchi 17; Rebs: Hamaguchi 6 Asts: Kawakami 4		Pts: Cheng 30; Rebs: Cheng 14; Asts: Chien 6

Geumjeong Gymnasium, Busan

9 October
13:00

Malaysia	57–105	Japan
Scoring by quarter: 14–28, 10–31, 19–26, 14–20
Pts: Chow, Chew 13; Rebs: Tai 5 Asts: Low M., Kew, Chew 1		Pts: Tachikawa 23; Rebs: Yamada 10; Asts: Yano, Kawakami 2

Geumjeong Gymnasium, Busan

9 October
17:00

China	82–71	South Korea
Scoring by quarter: 23–17, 19–10, 20–23, 20–21
Pts: Miao L. 22; Rebs: Chen N. 11; Asts: Song 3		Pts: Jung 42; Rebs: Jung 9 Asts: Kim Y. 2

Geumjeong Gymnasium, Busan

10 October
15:00

Chinese Taipei	72–110	China
Scoring by quarter: 22–41, 11–27, 14–25, 25–17
Pts: Chiang 15; Rebs: Chiang 7 Asts: Mai 4		Pts: Miao L. 25; Rebs: Chen X. 8 Asts: Miao L. 3

Geumjeong Gymnasium, Busan

=== Final round ===
Semifinals
12 October
China	92
Japan	69
12 October
South Korea	94
Chinese Taipei	68

Final
14 October
China	80
South Korea	76
3/4 placing
13 October
Japan	79
Chinese Taipei	86

==== Semifinals ====
12 October
13:00

China	92–69	Japan
Scoring by quarter: 25–17, 20–15, 18–20, 29–17
Pts: Chen N. 29; Rebs: Chen N. 16; Asts: Sui 5		Pts: Nagata 18; Rebs: Hamaguchi 7 Asts: Kawakami 2

Sajik Arena, Busan

12 October
17:00

South Korea	94–68	Chinese Taipei
Scoring by quarter: 19–17, 27–22, 22–11, 26–18
Pts: Jung 19; Rebs: Kim K. 9 Asts: Kim J. 4		Pts: Chiang 19; Rebs: Chiang 8 Asts: Chu, Chang, Cheng 1

Sajik Arena, Busan

==== 3/4 placing ====
13 October
15:00

Japan	79–86	Chinese Taipei
Scoring by quarter: 22–17, 16–25, 18–20, 23–24
Pts: Hamaguchi 20; Rebs: Kawakami, Nagata 6 Asts: Kawakami 4		Pts: Chiang 25; Rebs: Cheng 18; Asts: Cheng 3

Sajik Arena, Busan

==== Final ====
14 October
13:00

China	80–76	South Korea
Scoring by quarter: 24–21, 18–14, 21–18, 17–23
Pts: Sui 18; Rebs: Chen N. 14; Asts: Song, Sui 2		Pts: Jung 29; Rebs: Jung 7 Asts: Jung 3

Sajik Arena, Busan

== Final standing ==
Rank	Team	Pld	W	L
1st place, gold medalist(s)	China	7	7	0
2nd place, silver medalist(s)	South Korea	7	5	2
3rd place, bronze medalist(s)	Chinese Taipei	7	4	3
4	Japan	7	2	5
5	Uzbekistan	5	1	4
6	Malaysia	5	0	5
