= 2004 FIBA Asia Championship for Women =

2004 FIBA Women's Asia Cup
20th Asian Women's Basketball Championship

Tournament details
- Host country: Japan
- Dates: January 13–19
- Teams: 9 (from 44 federations)
- Venue: 1 (in 1 host city)

Final positions
- Champions: China (8th title)

Tournament statistics
- MVP: (China) Miao Lijie
- Top scorer: (Malaysia) Chow S.F. (22.3)
- Top rebounds: (India) Sam (16.7)
- Top assists: (Hong Kong) Wong Y.K. (4.3)
- PPG (Team): China (96.7)
- RPG (Team): India (57.7)
- APG (Team): South Korea (21.7)

Official website
- 2004 FIBA Asia Championship for Women

The 2004 FIBA Asia Championship for Women is the qualifying tournament for FIBA Asia at the women's basketball tournament at the 2004 Summer Olympics at Athens. The tournament was held on Sendai, Japan from January 13 to January 19. The championship is divided into two levels: Level I and Level II.

== Preliminary round ==
=== Level I ===
Team	Pld	W	L	PF	PA	PD	Pts
South Korea	4	4	0	378	257	+121	8
China	4	3	1	385	308	+77	7
Chinese Taipei	4	2	2	321	314	+7	6
Japan	4	1	3	356	328	+28	5
Thailand	4	0	4	250	483	−233	4

January 13
16:00

Report

South Korea	120–54	Thailand
Scoring by quarter: 32–12, 33–13, 25–11, 30–18
Pts: Jung S.M. 21; Rebs: Kim J.Y., Lee J.A., Kim K.R. 6 Asts: Kim J.Y. 6		Pts: Koumoon 18; Rebs: Tunsaw, Chirdpetcharat 4 Asts: Tunsaw, Koumoon, Sriintharasuth 2

Sendai City Gymnasium, Sendai
Referees: Nadine Crowley (CAN), Naresh Chander Aneja (IND)

January 13
18:00

Report

China	100–79	Japan
Scoring by quarter: 27–26, 32–17, 27–16, 14–20
Pts: Hu X.T. 16; Rebs: Chen N. 7 Asts: Pan W., Hu X.T. 3		Pts: Nagata 21; Rebs: Oga 5 Asts: Hamaguchi 2

Sendai City Gymnasium, Sendai
Referees: Jaroslav Janac (SVK), Tong See Koou (MAS)

January 14
16:00

Report

Chinese Taipei	62–89	China
Scoring by quarter: 26–24, 10–30, 11–23, 15–12
Pts: Cheng H.Y. 18; Rebs: Cheng H.Y. 7 Asts: Chiang F.C. 4		Pts: Miao L.J. 19; Rebs: Chen N. 11; Asts: Miao L.J. 4

Sendai City Gymnasium, Sendai
Referees: Trevor Perry (CAN), Richard Villanueva (PHI)

January 14
18:00

Report

Japan	67–99	South Korea
Scoring by quarter: 17–27, 9–22, 17–27, 24–23
Pts: Kusuda, Nagata 12; Rebs: Hamaguchi 10; Asts: Hamaguchi 4		Pts: Kim K.R. 18; Rebs: Jung S.M. 7 Asts: Park J.E. 7

Sendai City Gymnasium, Sendai
Referees: Jaroslav Janac (SVK), Nadine Crowley (CAN)

January 15
16:00

Report

Thailand	45–128	Japan
Scoring by quarter: 13–34, 9–32, 9–28, 14–34
Pts: Yothanan 12; Rebs: Koumoon, Papaktaku, Lakhan 3 Asts: Koumoon, Sriintharasuth 2		Pts: Oga 22; Rebs: Hamaguchi 10; Asts: Yabuuchi, Kusuda 5

Sendai City Gymnasium, Sendai
Referees: Richard Villanueva (PHI), Lee Hoa-chor (TPE)

January 15
18:00

Report

South Korea	79–59	Chinese Taipei
Scoring by quarter: 26–18, 22–11, 17–17, 14–13
Pts: Beon Y.H. 15; Rebs: Lee J.A. 7 Asts: Kim J.Y. 3		Pts: Chiang F.C., Liu C.Y. 14; Rebs: Cheng H.Y. 9 Asts: Five players 1

Sendai City Gymnasium, Sendai
Referees: Jaroslav Janac (SVK), Trevor Perry (CAN)

January 16
16:00

Report

Chinese Taipei	116–64	Thailand
Scoring by quarter: 34–17, 22–6, 25–22, 35–19
Pts: Chao P.F. 19; Rebs: Chen Y.J. 10; Asts: Mai Y.H. 10		Pts: Koumoon 18; Rebs: Tunsaw 9 Asts: Tunsaw 5

Sendai City Gymnasium, Sendai
Referees: Tong See Koou (MAS), Naresh Chander Aneja (IND)

January 16
18:00

Report

China	77–80 (OT)	South Korea
Scoring by quarter: 20–18, 20–15, 18–20, 12–17, Overtime: 7–10
Pts: Chen N. 23; Rebs: Chen N. 17; Asts: Song X.Y. 3		Pts: Jung S.M. 16; Rebs: Chun J.W., Kim K.R. 7 Asts: Lee M.S. 6

Sendai City Gymnasium, Sendai
Referees: Jaroslav Janac (SVK), Nadine Crowley (CAN)

January 17
16:00

Report

Thailand	87–119	China
Scoring by quarter: 13–21, 21–28, 30–36, 23–34
Pts: Yonyothinkul, Yothanan 15; Rebs: Lakhan 7 Asts: Tunsaw 4		Pts: Ye L. 17; Rebs: Chen N. 21; Asts: Song X.Y. 7

Sendai City Gymnasium, Sendai
Referees: Naresh Chander Aneja (IND), Richard Villanueva (PHI)

January 17
18:00

Report

Japan	82–84 (OT)	Chinese Taipei
Scoring by quarter: 24–16, 12–24, 21–23, 18–12, Overtime: 7–9
Pts: Yano 17; Rebs: Hamaguchi 11; Asts: Hamaguchi 5		Pts: Chiang F.C. 18; Rebs: Chiang F.C. 13; Asts: Chien W.C. 5

Sendai City Gymnasium, Sendai
Referees: Trevor Perry (CAN), Nadine Crowley (CAN)

=== Level II ===
Team	Pld	W	L	PF	PA	PD	Pts
Malaysia	3	3	0	266	191	+75	6
India	3	2	1	236	217	+19	5
Philippines	3	1	2	178	182	−4	4
Hong Kong	3	0	3	173	263	−90	3

January 13
14:00

Report

Malaysia	76–52	Philippines
Scoring by quarter: 23–14, 21–9, 9–13, 23–16
Pts: Chow S.F. 22; Rebs: Chow S.F. 7 Asts: Choo S.Y., Yoong S.Y. 4		Pts: Grajales 10; Rebs: Vega 10; Asts: Grajales 6

Sendai City Gymnasium, Sendai
Referees: Trevor Perry (CAN), Toru Katayose (JPN)

January 14
14:00

Report

India	90–74	Hong Kong
Scoring by quarter: 28–15, 29–22, 8–24, 25–13
Pts: Gujar 30; Rebs: Sam 16; Asts: Maggon 5		Pts: Lau K.C. 12; Rebs: Huang L.F. 10; Asts: Wong Y.K., Cheng K.S.L. 4

Sendai City Gymnasium, Sendai
Referees: Kim Chang-Hwan (KOR), Peng Ling (CHN)

January 15
14:00

Report

Philippines	55–69	India
Scoring by quarter: 18–22, 18–14, 8–21, 11–12
Pts: Vega 20; Rebs: Vega 13; Asts: Grajales 3		Pts: Gujar 21; Rebs: Sam 18; Asts: Maggon 4

Sendai City Gymnasium, Sendai
Referees: Chompoo Wachirasrisukanya (THA), Wu Chien-wu (TPE)

January 16
14:00

Report

Hong Kong	62–102	Malaysia
Scoring by quarter: 21–16, 10–29, 16–39, 15–18
Pts: Huang L.F. 17; Rebs: Huang L.F. 11; Asts: Wong Y.K. 6		Pts: Goh B.F., Chow S.F. 23; Rebs: Choo S.Y., Beh S.L. 6 Asts: Four players 4

Sendai City Gymnasium, Sendai
Referees: Kim Chang-Hwan (KOR), Toru Katayose (JPN)

January 17
14:00

Report

Philippines	71–37	Hong Kong
Scoring by quarter: 13–6, 28–8, 16–12, 14–11
Pts: Grajales 27; Rebs: Vega 9 Asts: Valencia 5		Pts: E. Lam, Chow S.F. 8 Rebs: Huang L.F. 11; Asts: Wong Y.K. 3

Sendai City Gymnasium, Sendai
Referees: Chompoo Wachirasrisukanya (THA), Peng Ling (CHN)

January 18
15:00

Report

India	77–88	Malaysia
Scoring by quarter: 21–28, 17–15, 13–24, 26–21
Pts: Sam 24; Rebs: Sam 16; Asts: Gujar 4		Pts: Low B.C., Chow S.F. 22; Rebs: Chow S.F. 9 Asts: Tai L.S., Low B.C. 4

Sendai City Gymnasium, Sendai
Referees: Wu Chien-wu (TPE), Toru Katayose (JPN)

== Final round ==
Semifinals
January 18
China	103
Chinese Taipei	53
January 18
South Korea	72
Japan (2OT)	81

Final
January 19
China	92
Japan	80
3rd place
January 19
Chinese Taipei	59
South Korea	88

=== Semifinals ===
January 18
17:00

Report

China	103–53	Chinese Taipei
Scoring by quarter: 22–8, 28–5, 23–19, 30–21
Pts: Wang L. 16; Rebs: Hu X.T. 9 Asts: Song X.Y. 8		Pts: Chang H.Y., Liu C.Y. 12; Rebs: Cheng H.Y., Tsai P.Y. 5 Asts: Chien W.C., Cheng H.Y. 3

Sendai City Gymnasium, Sendai
Referees: Nadine Crowley (CAN), Tong See Koou (MAS)

January 18
19:00

Report

South Korea	72–81 (2OT)	Japan
Scoring by quarter: 11–13, 17–11, 13–19, 15–13, Overtime: 9–9, 7–16
Pts: Beon Y.H. 18; Rebs: Jung S.M. 6 Asts: Lee M.S. 5		Pts: Yano 34; Rebs: Nagata 18; Asts: Yano 5

Sendai City Gymnasium, Sendai
Referees: Jaroslav Janac (SVK), Trevor Perry (CAN)

=== 3rd place ===
January 19
17:00

Report

Chinese Taipei	59–88	South Korea
Scoring by quarter: 16–30, 16–19, 7–26, 20–13
Pts: Cheng H.Y. 17; Rebs: Chiang F.C. 9 Asts: Chien W.C., Chang H.Y. 3		Pts: Beon Y.H. 18; Rebs: Kim K.R. 7 Asts: Kim K.R. 3

Sendai City Gymnasium, Sendai
Referees: Trevor Perry (CAN), Nadine Crowley (CAN)

=== Final ===
January 19
19:00

Report

China	92–80	Japan
Scoring by quarter: 21–17, 23–12, 23–20, 25–31
Pts: Wang L. 24; Rebs: Wang L. 9 Asts: Miao L.J. 10		Pts: Hamaguchi 17; Rebs: Oyama 5 Asts: Yabuuchi, Nagata 4

Sendai City Gymnasium, Sendai
Referees: Jaroslav Janac (SVK), Richard Villanueva (PHI)

== Final standing ==
Qualified for the 2004 Summer Olympics

Rank	Team	Record
1st place, gold medalist(s)	China	5–1
2nd place, silver medalist(s)	Japan	2–4
3rd place, bronze medalist(s)	South Korea	5–1
4	Chinese Taipei	2–4
5	Thailand	0–4
6	Malaysia	3–0
7	India	2–1
8	Philippines	1–2
9	Hong Kong	0–3

== Awards ==
2004 Asian champions

China
Eighth title

- Most Valuable Player: (China) Miao Lijie
