= Basketball at the 2006 Asian Games – Women's tournament =

Women at the 2006 Asian Games
- Venue: Basketball Indoor Hall
- Date: 4–14 December 2006
- Competitors: 71 from 6 nations

Medalists
gold medal	China
silver medal	Chinese Taipei
bronze medal	Japan

Women's basketball at the 2006 Asian Games was held in Doha from 4 December to 14 December 2006.

== Squads ==
China	Chinese Taipei	Japan	Lebanon
Song Xiaoyun; Bian Lan; Jia Guang; Zhang Wei; Miao Lijie; Ren Lei; Sui Feifei; Ji Xiao; Chen Xiaoli; Liu Dan; Zhang Xiaoni; Chen Nan	Chen Yi-feng; Chien Wei-chuan; Chiang Feng-chun; Sun Chieh-ping; Lan Jui-yu; Chu Yung-hsu; Wen Chi; Cheng Hui-yun; Lin Hui-mei; Lin Chi-wen; Li Wan-ting; Liu Chun-yi	Emi Isoyama; Hiromi Suwa; Yuki Morimoto; Yuka Watanabe; Noriko Sakakibara; Akino Nakagawa; Ryoko Utsumi; Eriko Hata; Asami Yoshida; Yuko Oga; Kumiko Yamada	Emma Eskidjian; Chirine El-Charif; Maya El-Achkar; Christelle El-Chalouhi; Sandra Najem; Nour Schoucair; Nayla Alameddine; Nisrin Dandan; Nathalie Mamo; Chada Nasr; Tamara Khalil; Alek Tabakian
South Korea	Thailand		
Kang Young-suk; Choi Youn-ah; Kim Se-long; Kim Eun-hye; Park Sun-young; Kim Ji-hyun; Beon Yeon-ha; Sin Jung-ja; Hong Hyun-hee; Kim Jung-eun; Kim Kwe-ryong; Yang Ji-hee	Nomjit Tunsaw; Nantana Charoenrat; Wipaporn Saechua; Pimonpan Papaktaku; Narumol Wandee; Juthamas Jantakan; Usa Jantuma; Pattrawadee Janthabut; Wilawan Chanasuek; Atitaya Likitsarun; Juthathip Mathuros; Naruemol Banmoo		

== Results ==
All times are Arabia Standard Time (UTC+03:00)

=== Preliminary ===
==== Group X ====
Pos	Team	Pld	W	L	PF	PA	PD	Pts	Qualification
1	China	2	2	0	181	90	+91	4	Semifinals
2	Japan	2	1	1	159	142	+17	3	Semifinals
3	Lebanon	2	0	2	97	205	−108	2	Classification 5th–6th

Source: Results

4 December
9:00

China	106–30	Lebanon
Scoring by quarter: 25–11, 19–5, 32–8, 30–6
Pts: Miao, Zhang X. 19; Rebs: Sui, Chen N. 9 Asts: Miao 7		Pts: Eskidjian 10; Rebs: Nasr 5 Asts: Nasr 2

Basketball Indoor Hall, Doha
Attendance: 600
Referees: Dawna Townsend (CAN), Kim Young-woo (KOR)

6 December
9:00

Lebanon	67–99	Japan
Scoring by quarter: 22–25, 22–20, 14–22, 9–32
Pts: Eskidjian 23; Rebs: Alameddine 7 Asts: Nasr 12		Pts: Watanabe 26; Rebs: Sakakibara 9 Asts: Oga 14

Basketball Indoor Hall, Doha
Attendance: 510
Referees: Damrongkiat Mungkit (THA), Tien Hsiao-lun (TPE)

8 December
9:00

China	75–60	Japan
Scoring by quarter: 16–14, 26–17, 15–14, 18–15
Pts: Chen N. 14; Rebs: Chen N. 9 Asts: Song 7		Pts: Oga 17; Rebs: Suwa, Sakakibara, Yamada 4 Asts: Sakakibara, Oga 4

Basketball Indoor Hall, Doha
Attendance: 200
Referees: Dawna Townsend (CAN), Kim Young-woo (KOR)

==== Group Y ====
Pos	Team	Pld	W	L	PF	PA	PD	Pts	Qualification
1	Chinese Taipei	2	2	0	182	146	+36	4	Semifinals
2	South Korea	2	1	1	174	119	+55	3	Semifinals
3	Thailand	2	0	2	112	203	−91	2	Classification 5th–6th

Source: Results

5 December
9:00

South Korea	73–80	Chinese Taipei
Scoring by quarter: 17–21, 17–22, 20–15, 19–22
Pts: Sin 19; Rebs: Kim K. 9 Asts: Choi 6		Pts: Liu 24; Rebs: Chiang 6 Asts: Chien 4

Basketball Indoor Hall, Doha
Attendance: 750
Referees: Chantal Julien (FRA), Yoji Fujigaki (JPN)

7 December
9:00

Chinese Taipei	102–73	Thailand
Scoring by quarter: 37–16, 18–17, 19–23, 28–17
Pts: Chiang, Liu 18; Rebs: Li 11; Asts: Wen 9		Pts: Charoenrat 19; Rebs: Papaktaku, Mathuros 8 Asts: Tunsaw 5

Basketball Indoor Hall, Doha
Attendance: 200
Referees: Zheng Jun (CHN), Arsen Andryushkin (KAZ)

9 December
11:15

South Korea	101–39	Thailand
Scoring by quarter: 19–13, 24–9, 23–7, 35–10
Pts: Kim K. 25; Rebs: Kim K. 10; Asts: Choi 9		Pts: Charoenrat 13; Rebs: Mathuros 7 Asts: Tunsaw 2

Basketball Indoor Hall, Doha
Attendance: 790
Referees: Yoji Fujigaki (JPN), Zheng Jun (CHN)

=== Classification 5th–6th ===
11 December
10:00

Lebanon	77–85	Thailand
Scoring by quarter: 14–22, 20–19, 24–21, 19–23
Pts: Eskidjian 22; Rebs: Eskidjian 13; Asts: Nasr 9		Pts: Charoenrat 29; Rebs: Charoenrat 13; Asts: Mathuros, Banmoo 5

Basketball Indoor Hall, Doha
Attendance: 77
Referees: Tien Hsiao-lun (TPE), Arsen Andryushkin (KAZ)

=== Final round ===
Semifinals
11 December
China	77
South Korea	53
11 December
Chinese Taipei	70
Japan	59

Gold medal match
14 December
China	90
Chinese Taipei	59
Bronze medal match
14 December
South Korea	70
Japan	74

==== Semifinals ====
11 December
17:00

China	77–53	South Korea
Scoring by quarter: 21–9, 16–13, 22–18, 18–13
Pts: Chen N. 20; Rebs: Chen N. 8 Asts: Song, Miao 4		Pts: Beon 20; Rebs: Sin 9 Asts: Beon, Sin 2

Basketball Indoor Hall, Doha
Attendance: 600
Referees: Chantal Julien (FRA), Jasem Nathar (QAT)

11 December
19:15

Chinese Taipei	70–59	Japan
Scoring by quarter: 17–18, 16–12, 24–21, 13–8
Pts: Chiang 21; Rebs: Chiang, Lin H. 9 Asts: Chiang 5		Pts: Yamada 18; Rebs: Suwa 9 Asts: Oga 6

Basketball Indoor Hall, Doha
Attendance: 820
Referees: Dawna Townsend (CAN), Fadhel Jaffar (BRN)

==== Bronze medal match ====
14 December
19:00

South Korea	70–74	Japan
Scoring by quarter: 17–25, 19–14, 18–22, 16–13
Pts: Beon 22; Rebs: Sin 8 Asts: Sin 4		Pts: Utsumi 24; Rebs: Oga 9 Asts: Sakakibara, Oga 6

Basketball Indoor Hall, Doha
Attendance: 1,071
Referees: Marwan Egho (LIB), Payam Seifizadeh (IRI)

==== Gold medal match ====
14 December
21:15

China	90–59	Chinese Taipei
Scoring by quarter: 24–21, 22–12, 28–10, 16–16
Pts: Chen X. 21; Rebs: Chen X. 12; Asts: Miao 5		Pts: Lin H. 18; Rebs: Lin C., Li 3 Asts: Wen 6

Basketball Indoor Hall, Doha
Attendance: 1,250
Referees: Chantal Julien (FRA), Dawna Townsend (CAN)

== Final standing ==
Rank	Team	Pld	W	L
1st place, gold medalist(s)	China	4	4	0
2nd place, silver medalist(s)	Chinese Taipei	4	3	1
3rd place, bronze medalist(s)	Japan	4	2	2
4	South Korea	4	1	3
5	Thailand	3	1	2
6	Lebanon	3	0	3
