= Basketball at the 2008 Summer Olympics – Women's tournament =

Tournament details
- Host country: China
- Dates: 9–23 August 2008

Final positions
- Champions: United States (6th title)

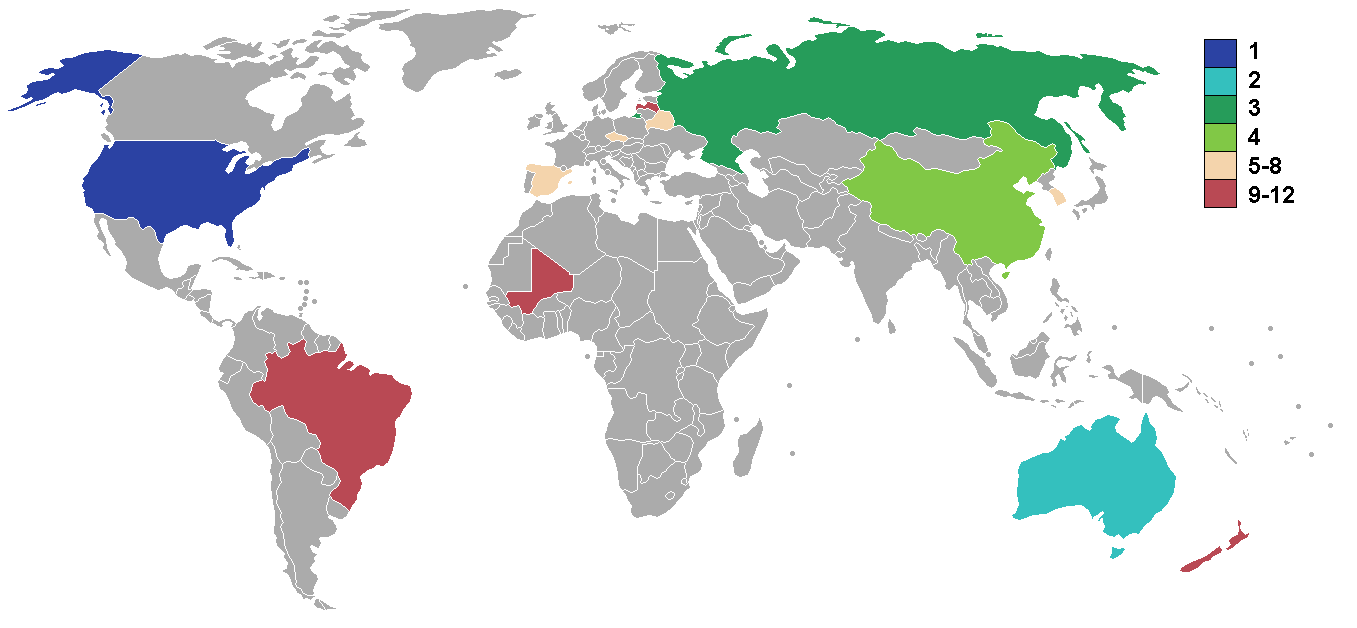
Competing teams.

The women's tournament of the basketball at the 2008 Olympics at Beijing, China began on August 9 and ended on August 23, when the United States defeated Australia 92–65 for the gold medal. All games were held at the Wukesong Indoor Stadium.

== Qualifying ==
Country	Qualified as	Date of qualification	Previous appearance	FIBA World Ranking
China	Olympics host	July 13, 2001	4 (1988, 1992, 1996, 2004)	10
Australia	World champion	September 23, 2006	6 (1984, 1988, 1996, 2000, 2004)	2
South Korea	Asian champion	June 30, 2007	5 (1984, 1988, 1996, 2000, 2004)	7
New Zealand	Oceanian champion	September 28, 2007	2 (2000, 2004)	16
Mali	African champion	September 30, 2007	0	31
United States	Americas champion	June 30, 2007	7 (1976, 1984, 1988, 1992, 1996, 2000, 2004)	1
Russia	European champion	October 7, 2007	3 (1996, 2000, 2004)	3
Spain	Wildcard qualifier	June 13, 2008	2 (1992, 2004)	5
Czech Republic	Wildcard qualifier	June 13, 2008	1 (2004)	9
Latvia	Wildcard qualifier	June 13, 2008	0	26
Belarus	Wildcard qualifier	June 13, 2008	0	30
Brazil	Wildcard qualifier	June 15, 2008	4 (1992, 1996, 2000, 2004)	4

== Format ==
- Twelve teams are split into 2 preliminary round groups of 6 teams each. The top 4 teams from each group qualify for the knockout stage.
- Fifth-placed teams from each group are ranked 9th–10th by basis of their records.
- Sixth-placed teams from each group are ranked 11th–12th by basis of their records.
- In the quarterfinals, the matchups are as follows: A1 vs. B4, A2 vs. B3, A3 vs. B2 and A4 vs. B1.
  - The eliminated teams at the quarterfinals are ranked 5th–8th by basis of their preliminary round records
- The winning teams from the quarterfinals meet in the semifinals as follows: A1/B4 vs. A3/B2 and A2/B3 vs. A4/B1.
- The winning teams from the semifinals dispute the gold medal. The losing teams dispute the bronze.

Ties are broken via the following the criteria, with the first option used first, all the way down to the last option:

1. Head to head results
2. Goal average (not the goal difference) between the tied teams
3. Goal average of the tied teams for all teams in its group

All times are local Beijing Time (GMT+8).

== Preliminary round ==
All times are China Standard Time (UTC+8)

=== Group A ===
Pos	Team	Pld	W	L	PF	PA	PD	Pts	Qualification
1	Australia	5	5	0	424	319	+105	10	Quarterfinals
2	Russia	5	4	1	339	333	+6	9	Quarterfinals
3	Belarus	5	2	3	324	332	−8	7 (Note: Head-to-head record: Belarus 1–0 South Korea)	Quarterfinals
4	South Korea	5	2	3	327	360	−33	7	Quarterfinals
5	Latvia	5	1	4	334	387	−53	6 (Note: Head-to-head record: Latvia 1–0 Brazil)	
6	Brazil	5	1	4	337	354	−17	6	

Source: FIBA archive
Rules for classification: 1) points; 2) head-to-head points; 3) head-to-head goal average; 4) head-to-head number of points scored.
Notes:

9 August 2008
09:00

Report

Belarus	64–83	Australia
Scoring by quarter: 12–19, 16–25 , 22–21, 14–18
Pts: Leuchanka 13, Troina 13; Rebs: Leuchanka 10; Asts: Marchanka 2		Pts: Jackson 18; Rebs: Batkovic 12; Asts: Harrower 5

Wukesong Indoor Stadium, Beijing
Attendance: 11,083
Referees: Nikolaos Zavlanos (GRE)

9 August 2008
16:45

Report

South Korea	68–62 (OT)	Brazil
Scoring by quarter: 13–14, 13–14, 15–15, 14–12, Overtime: 13–7
Pts: Beon 19, Choi 19; Rebs: Jung 8 Asts: Jung 5		Pts: Santos 13; Rebs: Nascimento 12; Asts: Jacintho 3

Wukesong Indoor Stadium, Beijing
Attendance: 11,083
Referees: Fabio Facchini (ITA)

9 August 2008
22:15

Report

Latvia	57–62	Russia
Scoring by quarter: 7–14, 24–15, 17–12, 9–21
Pts: Jansone 24; Rebs: Tamane 6, Kubliņa 6 Asts: Jēkabsone-Žogota 6		Pts: Shchegoleva 12, Korstin 12; Rebs: Shchegoleva 12; Asts: Rakhmatulina 5

Wukesong Indoor Stadium, Beijing
Attendance: 11,083
Referees: Pablo Estevez (ARG)

11 August 2008
14:30

Report

South Korea	72–77	Russia
Scoring by quarter: 15–24, 20–13, 24–21, 13–19
Pts: Choi 13; Rebs: Sin 3 Asts: Jung 6		Pts: Korstin, Shchegoleva 13; Rebs: Osipova 9 Asts: Rakhmatulina 5

Wukesong Indoor Stadium, Beijing
Attendance: 11,083
Referees: Petr Sudek (SVK)

11 August 2008
16:45

Report

Latvia	57–79	Belarus
Scoring by quarter: 20–21, 15–19, 14–20, 8–19
Pts: Baško 19; Rebs: Jansone, Kubliņa, Tamane 6 Asts: Eglīte 3		Pts: Leuchanka 22; Rebs: Verameyenka 9 Asts: Marchanka 5

Wukesong Indoor Stadium, Beijing
Attendance: 11,083
Referees: Ilija Belosevic (SRB)

11 August 2008
22:15

Report

Australia	80–65	Brazil
Scoring by quarter: 29–14, 21–15, 11–20, 19–16
Pts: Summerton 18; Rebs: Taylor 8 Asts: Harrower 5		Pts: Santos 21; Rebs: Santos 10; Asts: Santos 3

Wukesong Indoor Stadium, Beijing
Attendance: 11,083
Referees: Nikolaos Pitsilkas (GRE)

13 August 2008
09:00

Report

Belarus	65–71	Russia
Scoring by quarter: 19–20, 8–15, 13–17, 25–19
Pts: Marchanka 16; Rebs: Leuchanka 12; Asts: Leuchanka 4		Pts: Stepanova 13; Rebs: Abrosimova 10; Asts: Korstin 2

Wukesong Indoor Stadium, Beijing
Attendance: 11,083
Referees: Eddie Rush (USA)

13 August 2008
14:30

Report

Brazil	78–79	Latvia
Scoring by quarter: 23–14, 13–17, 23–26, 19–22
Pts: Zakrzeski 16; Rebs: Santos, Zakrzeski 9 Asts: Pinto 4		Pts: Jēkabsone 25; Rebs: Kubliņa 7 Asts: Jēkabsone 5

Wukesong Indoor Stadium, Beijing
Attendance: 11,083
Referees: Reynaldo Mercedes (DOM)

13 August 2008
20:00

Report

Australia	90–62	South Korea
Scoring by quarter: 23–14, 24–19, 26–17, 17–12
Pts: Taylor, Batkovic 18; Rebs: Batkovic 10; Asts: Harrower 5		Pts: Beon 20; Rebs: seven players 2 Asts: Lee 5

Wukesong Indoor Stadium, Beijing
Attendance: 11,083
Referees: Romualdas Brazauskas (LTU)

15 August 2008
11:15

Report

Latvia	73–96	Australia
Scoring by quarter: 18–19, 20–22, 18–35, 17–20
Pts: Tāre 14; Rebs: Brumermane, Jansone 5 Asts: Tāre 4		Pts: Jackson 30; Rebs: Taylor 11; Asts: Harrower, Taylor 4

Wukesong Indoor Stadium, Beijing
Attendance: 11,083
Referees: Pablo Estevez (ARG)

15 August 2008
14:30

Report

Russia	74–64	Brazil
Scoring by quarter: 21–26, 14–15, 19–15, 20–8
Pts: Shchegoleva 14; Rebs: Korstin 10; Asts: Korstin 5		Pts: Pinto 21; Rebs: Zakrzeski 5 Asts: Pinto 6

Wukesong Indoor Stadium, Beijing
Attendance: 11,083
Referees: Luigi Lamonica (ITA)

15 August 2008
22:15

Report

South Korea	53–63	Belarus
Scoring by quarter: 15–12, 13–21, 9–17, 16–13
Pts: Lee, Jung 10; Rebs: Lee, Beon 6 Asts: Beon 3		Pts: Snytsina 15; Rebs: Leuchanka 14; Asts: Maarchanka 5

Wukesong Indoor Stadium, Beijing
Attendance: 11,083
Referees: Nikolaos Pitsilkas (GRE)

17 August 2008
11:15

Report

Australia	75–55	Russia
Scoring by quarter: 15–19, 10–18, 30–10, 20–8
Pts: Snell, Jackson 16; Rebs: Jackson 14; Asts: Harrower 7		Pts: Hammon 20; Rebs: Abrosimova, Osipova 9 Asts: Karpunina 2

Wukesong Indoor Stadium, Beijing
Attendance: 11,083
Referees: Pablo Estevez (ARG)

17 August 2008
14:30

Report

South Korea	72–68	Latvia
Scoring by quarter: 20–22, 22–13, 18–9, 12–24
Pts: Park 17; Rebs: Lee 10; Asts: Lee 4		Pts: Jēkabsone-Žogota 22; Rebs: Tamane 11; Asts: Jēkabsone-Žogota 5

Wukesong Indoor Stadium, Beijing
Attendance: 11,083
Referees: Jose Carreon (PUR)

17 August 2008
16:45

Report

Brazil	68–53	Belarus
Scoring by quarter: 20–12, 19–14, 10–12, 19–15
Pts: Santos 14; Rebs: Nascimento 10; Asts: Nascimento 3		Pts: Anufryienka, Leuchanka 10; Rebs: Verameyenka 10; Asts: Marchanka 4

Wukesong Indoor Stadium, Beijing
Attendance: 11,083
Referees: Juan Arteaga (ESP)

=== Group B ===
Pos	Team	Pld	W	L	PF	PA	PD	Pts	Qualification
1	United States	5	5	0	491	276	+215	10	Quarterfinals
2	China (H)	5	4	1	358	346	+12	9	Quarterfinals
3	Spain	5	3	2	357	324	+33	8	Quarterfinals
4	Czech Republic	5	2	3	346	356	−10	7	Quarterfinals
5	New Zealand	5	1	4	320	423	−103	6	
6	Mali	5	0	5	255	402	−147	5	

Source: FIBA archive
Rules for classification: 1) points; 2) head-to-head points; 3) head-to-head points difference; 4) head-to-head number of points scored.
(H) Hosts

9 August 2008
11:15

Report

Mali	72–76	New Zealand
Scoring by quarter: 18–18, 15–24, 21–18, 18–16
Pts: Maïga 18; Rebs: Coulibaly 12; Asts: Maïga 3		Pts: Marino 19; Rebs: Harmon 8 Asts: Marino 4

Wukesong Indoor Stadium, Beijing
Attendance: 11,083
Referees: Stephen Seibel (CAN)

9 August 2008
14:30

Report

China	67–64	Spain
Scoring by quarter: 18–15, 19–9, 15–20, 15–20
Pts: Bian 15; Rebs: Bian 12; Asts: Miao 3		Pts: Torrens 18; Rebs: Montañana 7 Asts: Palau 4

Wukesong Indoor Stadium, Beijing
Attendance: 11,083
Referees: Jose Carrion (PUR)

9 August 2008
20:00

Report

Czech Republic	57–97	United States
Scoring by quarter: 17–22, 14–27, 13–26, 13–22
Pts: Veselá 8 Rebs: Veselá 9 Asts: Machová 4		Pts: Pondexter 12; Rebs: Fowles 14; Asts: Lawson 3

Wukesong Indoor Stadium, Beijing
Attendance: 11,083
Referees: Michael Aylen (AUS)

11 August 2008
09:00

Report

New Zealand	62–85	Spain
Scoring by quarter: 7–18, 20–22, 20–20, 15–25
Pts: Harmon 22; Rebs: Wallbutton 6 Asts: Harmon 3		Pts: Sanchez 19; Rebs: Montañana 7 Asts: Aguilar, Sánchez, Torrens 2

Wukesong Indoor Stadium, Beijing
Attendance: 11,083
Referees: Abreu Muhimua (MOZ)

11 August 2008
11:15

Report

Czech Republic	81–47	Mali
Scoring by quarter: 23–4, 15–18, 18–11, 25–14
Pts: Machová 14; Rebs: Kulichova, Vecerova 7 Asts: Mokrosova 3		Pts: Sissoko 24; Rebs: Sissoko 13; Asts: Bagayoko 3

Wukesong Indoor Stadium, Beijing
Attendance: 11,083
Referees: Scott Butler (AUS)

11 August 2008
20:00

Report

China	63–108	United States
Scoring by quarter: 11–33, 16–28, 19–20, 17–27
Pts: Miao 16; Rebs: Bian, Liu, Sui 4 Asts: Miao, Shao 3		Pts: Thompson 27; Rebs: Leslie 10; Asts: Lawson, Pondexter 5

Wukesong Indoor Stadium, Beijing
Attendance: 11,083
Referees: Romualdas Brazauskas (LTU)

13 August 2008
11:15

Report

Spain	74–55	Czech Republic
Scoring by quarter: 15–21, 13–6, 30–11, 16–17
Pts: Montañana 20; Rebs: Pascua 8 Asts: Palau 5		Pts: Viteckova 12; Rebs: Machová 8 Asts: Machová 5

Wukesong Indoor Stadium, Beijing
Attendance: 11,083
Referees: Carl Jungebrand (FIN)

13 August 2008
16:45

Report

China	80–63	New Zealand
Scoring by quarter: 26–18, 24–13, 15–17, 15–15
Pts: Chen 26; Rebs: Chen 17; Asts: Miao 6		Pts: Harmon, Marino 14; Rebs: Harmon 8 Asts: Bates 4

Wukesong Indoor Stadium, Beijing
Attendance: 11,083
Referees: Yuji Hirahara (JPN)

13 August 2008
22:15

Report

Mali	41–97	United States
Scoring by quarter: 12–24, 16–27, 5–25, 9–21
Pts: Sininta 13; Rebs: Sissoko 7 Asts: Bagayoko 3		Pts: Leslie 16; Rebs: Fowles 6 Asts: Lawson 7

Wukesong Indoor Stadium, Beijing
Attendance: 11,083
Referees: Maogong Yang (CHN)

15 August 2008
09:00

Report

Czech Republic	90–59	New Zealand
Scoring by quarter: 26–12, 18–19, 21–7, 25–21
Pts: Machová 23; Rebs: Vesela 10; Asts: Vesela 5		Pts: Marino 22; Rebs: Wallbutton 10; Asts: Bates 5

Wukesong Indoor Stadium, Beijing
Attendance: 11,083
Referees: Chantal Julien (FRA)

15 August 2008
16:45

Report

China	69–48	Mali
Scoring by quarter: 17–7, 20–13, 15–15, 17–13
Pts: Miao 25; Rebs: Chen 9 Asts: Sui 5		Pts: Diawara, Sininta 11; Rebs: Sissoko 19; Asts: Diawara, Sininta 1

Wukesong Indoor Stadium, Beijing
Attendance: 11,083
Referees: Reynaldo Mercedes (DOM)

15 August 2008
20:00

Report

United States	93–55	Spain
Scoring by quarter: 22–17, 17–17, 23–10, 31–11
Pts: Thompson 17; Rebs: Leslie 11; Asts: Lawson, Leslie, Parker 2		Pts: Valdemoro 17; Rebs: Nicholls 5 Asts: Martínez 2

Wukesong Indoor Stadium, Beijing
Attendance: 11,083
Referees: Fabio Facchini (ITA)

17 August 2008
09:00

Report

Mali	47–79	Spain
Scoring by quarter: 5–19, 16–17, 12–22, 13–21
Pts: Sissoko 17; Rebs: Diawara 15; Asts: Diawara, Kanouté 2		Pts: Valdemoro 21; Rebs: Montañana 9 Asts: Montañana, Aguilar, Lima, Martínez 4

Wukesong Indoor Stadium, Beijing
Attendance: 11,083
Referees: Elena Chernova (RUS)

17 August 2008
20:00

Report

China	79–63	Czech Republic
Scoring by quarter: 24–11, 17–14, 24–20, 14–18
Pts: Miao 21; Rebs: Bian 9 Asts: Chen 3		Pts: Hartigova 15; Rebs: Veselá, Vecerova 8 Asts: Veselá, Machová 3

Wukesong Indoor Stadium, Beijing
Attendance: 11,083
Referees: Stephen Seibel (CAN)

17 August 2008
22:15

Report

New Zealand	60–96	United States
Scoring by quarter: 18–23, 6–27, 18–25, 18–21
Pts: Marino 17; Rebs: Harmon 7 Asts: Marino 17		Pts: Thompson 15; Rebs: Leslie, Fowles 6 Asts: Taurasi 5

Wukesong Indoor Stadium, Beijing
Attendance: 11,083
Referees: Luigi Lamonica (ITA)

== Knockout round ==
Quarterfinals
A2	Russia	84
B3	Spain	65
B1	United States	104
A4	South Korea	60
B2	China	77
A3	Belarus	62
A1	Australia	79
B4	Czech Republic	46

Semifinals
A2	Russia	52
B1	United States	67
B2	China	56
A1	Australia	90

Gold medal game
B1	United States	92
A1	Australia	65
Bronze medal game
A2	Russia	94
B2	China	81

=== Quarterfinals ===
19 August 2008
14:30

Report

China	77–62	Belarus
Scoring by quarter: 19–13, 19–12, 18–18, 21–19
Pts: Miao 28; Rebs: Song, Chen, Sui 4 Asts: Miao 3		Pts: Troina 15; Rebs: Leuchanka 13; Asts: Padabed, Marchanka 5

Wukesong Indoor Stadium, Beijing
Attendance: 11,083
Referees: Fabio Facchini (ITA)

19 August 2008
16:45

Report

Australia	79–46	Czech Republic
Scoring by quarter: 23–10, 15–7, 23–10, 17–19
Pts: Jackson 17; Rebs: Jackson 12; Asts: Harrower 4		Pts: Vecerova, Machova 8 Rebs: Kulichova 5 Asts: Machova 4

Wukesong Indoor Stadium, Beijing
Attendance: 11,083
Referees: Romualdas Brazauskas (LTU)

19 August 2008
20:00

Report

United States	104–60	South Korea
Scoring by quarter: 25–21, 26–9, 26–9, 27–21
Pts: Fowles 26; Rebs: Fowles 14; Asts: Augustus 3		Pts: Kim 14; Rebs: Kim 5 Asts: Park 7

Wukesong Indoor Stadium, Beijing
Attendance: 11,083
Referees: Stephen Seibel (USA)

19 August 2008
22:15

Report

Russia	84–65	Spain
Scoring by quarter: 10–21, 22–19, 24–15, 28–10
Pts: Shchegoleva 19; Rebs: Stepanova 10; Asts: Rakhmatulina 4		Pts: Valdemoro 16; Rebs: Pascua 6 Asts: Valdemoro, Palau, Torrens 1

Wukesong Indoor Stadium, Beijing
Attendance: 11,083
Referees: Ilija Belosevic (SRB)

=== Semifinals ===
21 August 2008
20:00

Report

Russia	52–67	United States
Scoring by quarter: 16–13, 16–20, 8–15, 12–19
Pts: Stepanova 14; Rebs: Korstin 8 Asts: Six-way tie 1		Pts: Taurasi 21; Rebs: Fowles 10; Asts: Smith 3

Wukesong Indoor Stadium, Beijing
Attendance: 11,083
Referees: Cristiano Maranho (BRA)

21 August 2008
22:15

Report

China	56–90	Australia
Scoring by quarter: 11–13, 7–21, 21–23, 17–33
Pts: Bian 20; Rebs: Liu, Sui 7 Asts: Bian 2		Pts: Snell 16; Rebs: Batkovic 13; Asts: Harrower, Snell 4

Wukesong Indoor Stadium, Beijing
Attendance: 11,083
Referees: Chantal Julien (FRA)

=== Bronze medal game ===
23 August 2008
19:30

Report

(bronze) Russia	94–81	China
Scoring by quarter: 24–23, 28–16, 20–18, 22–24
Pts: Hammon 22; Rebs: Stepanova 9 Asts: Karpunina 5		Pts: Chen 26; Rebs: Bian, Sui 6 Asts: Song 7

Wukesong Indoor Stadium, Beijing
Attendance: 11,083
Referees: Scott Butler (AUS)

=== Gold medal game ===
23 August 2008
22:00

Report

(gold) United States	92–65	Australia (silver)
Scoring by quarter: 22–15, 25–15, 22–24, 23–11
Pts: Lawson 15; Rebs: Leslie 7 Asts: Thompson 4		Pts: Jackson 20; Rebs: Jackson 10; Asts: Grima 2

Wukesong Indoor Stadium, Beijing
Attendance: 11,083
Referees: Nikolaos Zavlanos (GRE)

== Awards ==
2008 Women's Olympic Basketball Champions

United States
Sixth title

== Final standings ==
Rankings are determined by:

- 1st–4th
  - Results of gold and bronze medal games.
- 5th–8th:
  - Win–loss record in the preliminary round group
  - Standings in the preliminary round group (i.e. Group A's #3 is ranked higher than Group B's #4.)
  - Goal average in the preliminary round group
- 9th–10th and 11th–12th:
  - 5th placers in the preliminary round groups are classified 9th–10th; 6th placers classified 11th–12th
  - Win–loss record in the preliminary round group
  - Goal average in the preliminary round group

Rank	Team	Pld	W	L	PF	PA	PD	Standing	GAvg
1st place, gold medalist(s)	United States	8	8	0	754	453	+301		
2nd place, silver medalist(s)	Australia	8	7	1	658	513	+145		
3rd place, bronze medalist(s)	Russia	8	6	2	569	546	+23		
4th	China	8	5	3	572	592	−20	–	
5th	Spain	6	3	3	422	408	+14	–	
6th	Belarus	6	2	4	386	409	−23	A-3rd	
7th	Czech Republic	6	2	4	392	435	−43	B-4th	0.901
8th	South Korea	6	2	4	387	464	−77	A-4th	0.834
9th	Latvia	5	1	4	334	387	−53	A-5th	0.863
10th	New Zealand	5	1	4	320	423	−103	B-5th	0.757
11th	Brazil	5	1	4	337	354	−17	A-6th	
12th	Mali	5	0	5	255	402	−147	–	

== Statistical leaders ==
=== Points ===
Name	PPG
(China) Miao Lijie	18.1
(Australia) Lauren Jackson	16.9
(New Zealand) Angela Marino	15.8
(Latvia) Anete Jekabsone-Zogota	15.8
(Spain) Anna Montañana	14.5
(South Korea) Beon Yeon-Ha	14.2
(Belarus) Yelena Leuchanka	13.8
(United States) Sylvia Fowles	13.4
(United States) Tina Thompson	13.4
(Mali) Djénébou Sissoko	13.4

=== Rebounds ===
Name	RPG
(Belarus) Yelena Leuchanka	10.0
(Mali) Djénébou Sissoko	10.0
(Australia) Suzy Batkovic	8.9
(United States) Sylvia Fowles	8.9
(Australia) Lauren Jackson	8.4
(Belarus) Anastasiya Verameyenka	8.3
(China) Chen Nan	8.1
(Mali) Diéné Diawara	8.0
(Czech Republic) Jana Vesela	7.5
(Australia) Penny Taylor	7.2

=== Assists ===
Name	APG
(Australia) Kristi Harrower	4.9
(Latvia) Anete Jēkabsone-Žogota	4.0
(Belarus) Natallia Marchanka	3.7
(United States) Kara Lawson	3.1
(Czech Republic) Hana Machová	3.0
(Brazil) Adriana Moises Pinto	2.8
(China) Miao Lijie	2.6
(Australia) Belinda Snell	2.6
(Australia) Penny Taylor	2.5
(Mali) Hamchetou Maiga	2.5

=== Game highs ===
Department	Name	Total	Opponent
Points	(Australia) Lauren Jackson	30	Latvia
Rebounds	(Mali) Djenebou Sissoko	19	China
Assists	(Australia) Kristi Harrower (United States) Kara Lawson (South Korea) Park Jung-Eun	7	Russia; Mali; United States
Assists	(South Korea) Lee Mi-Sun (Spain) Anna Montañana (Spain) Amaya Valdemoro	7	Belarus; Mali; Mali
Blocks	10 players	3	---
Field goal percentage	(United States) Lisa Leslie	100% (7/7)	Mali
3-point field goal percentage	(Latvia) Gunta Basko (Russia) Ilona Korstin	100% (2/2)	Australia; Latvia
Field throw percentage	(South Korea) Choi Youn-Ah (Belarus) Yelena Leuchanka	100% (8/8)	Brazil (OT); South Korea (non-OT)
Turnovers	(Belarus) Natallia Marchanka	8	South Korea

== See also ==
- Men's Tournament
