= Basketball at the 2002 Asian Games =

- Venue: Geumjeong Gymnasium; Sajik Arena
- Date: 28 September – 14 October 2002
- Competitors: 213 from 14 nations

Basketball was one of the many sports which was held at the 2002 Asian Games in Busan, South Korea between 28 September and 14 October 2002. The competition took place at Geumjeong Gymnasium and Sajik Arena.

== Schedule ==
P	Preliminary round	S	Second round	C	Classification	½	Semifinals	B	Bronze medal match	G	Gold medal match

Event↓/Date →	28th Sat	29th Sun	30th Mon	1st Tue	2nd Wed	3rd Thu	4th Fri	5th Sat	6th Sun	7th Mon	8th Tue	9th Wed	10th Thu	11th Fri	12th Sat	13th Sun	14th Mon
Men	P	P	P		S	S	S	S	S	S	S	S	C		½	B	G
Women						P	P	P	P	P	P	P	P		½	B	G

== Medalists ==
Event	Gold	Silver	Bronze
Men	South Korea; Choo Seung-gyun; Shin Ki-sung; Kim Seung-hyun; Cho Sang-hyun; Lee Kyu-sup; Hyun Joo-yup; Moon Kyung-eun; Seo Jang-hoon; Bang Sung-yoon; Chun Hee-chul; Lee Sang-min; Kim Joo-sung	China; Guo Shiqiang; Liu Wei; Gong Xiaobin; Zhang Cheng; Hu Weidong; Chen Ke; Li Nan; Liu Yudong; Zhu Fangyu; Yao Ming; Mengke Bateer; Du Feng	Kazakhstan; Roman Muravyov; Fedor Zakharchenko; Alexey Yeropkin; Vitaliy Lopatin; Alexandr Yemelyanov; Mikhail Dedov; Yevgeniy Issakov; Sergey Vdovin; Vitaliy Strebkov; Yevgeniy Ovsyannikov; Alexandr Derbush; Boris Tikhonenko
Women	China; Song Xiaoyun; Zhang Hanlan; Pan Wei; Miao Bo; Miao Lijie; Ren Lei; Sui Feifei; Liu Xiaohong; Chen Luyun; Zhang Xiaoni; Chen Xiaoli; Chen Nan	South Korea; Kim Yeong-ok; Chun Joo-weon; Kim Ji-yoon; Lee Eun-ju; Jang Sun-hyoung; Lee Mi-sun; Beon Yeon-ha; Park Jung-eun; Hong Hyun-hee; Lee Jong-ae; Jung Sun-min; Kim Kwe-ryong	Chinese Taipei; Chu Yung-hsu; Chien Wei-chuan; Chiang Feng-chun; Mai Ya-hui; Chao Pi-feng; Huang Shiau-jie; Chang Hui-yin; Cheng Hui-yun; Tsai Pei-ying; Tang Su-tuan; Chen Yi-ju; Liu Chun-yi

== Medal table ==
Rank	Nation	Gold	Silver	Bronze	Total
1	China (CHN)	1	1	0	2
1	South Korea (KOR)	1	1	0	2
3	Chinese Taipei (TPE)	0	0	1	1
3	Kazakhstan (KAZ)	0	0	1	1
Totals (4 entries)		2	2	2	6

== Draw ==
The teams were seeded based on their final ranking at the 1998 Asian Games.

=== Men ===
Group A

- China (1)
- Hong Kong (11)
- ~~Lebanon~~*

Group B

- South Korea (2)
- Japan (10)
- Kuwait*
- Mongolia

Group C

- Philippines (3)
- United Arab Emirates (8)
- ~~India~~*

Group D

- Kazakhstan (4)
- Chinese Taipei (5)
- Qatar

* Lebanon and India withdrew, India was replaced by North Korea and Kuwait moved to Group A to balance the number of teams in each group.

=== Women ===
Group A

- Japan (1)
- Chinese Taipei (4)
- ~~Lebanon~~*
- ~~India~~*

Group B

- China (2)
- South Korea (3)
- Malaysia
- Uzbekistan

* Lebanon and India withdrew, The remaining teams played in a round-robin competition.

== Final standing ==
=== Men ===
Rank	Team	Pld	W	L
1st place, gold medalist(s)	South Korea	7	7	0
2nd place, silver medalist(s)	China	7	6	1
3rd place, bronze medalist(s)	Kazakhstan	7	4	3
4	Philippines	7	4	3
5	North Korea	6	3	3
6	Japan	6	2	4
7	Chinese Taipei	6	2	4
8	Hong Kong	6	1	5
9	Qatar	5	4	1
10	Kuwait	5	2	3
11	United Arab Emirates	5	1	4
12	Mongolia	5	0	5

=== Women ===
Rank	Team	Pld	W	L
1st place, gold medalist(s)	China	7	7	0
2nd place, silver medalist(s)	South Korea	7	5	2
3rd place, bronze medalist(s)	Chinese Taipei	7	4	3
4	Japan	7	2	5
5	Uzbekistan	5	1	4
6	Malaysia	5	0	5
