= Basketball at the 2006 Asian Games =

- Venue: Basketball Indoor Hall
- Date: 23 November – 15 December 2006
- Competitors: 310 from 21 nations

Basketball at the 2006 Asian Games was the second early start among the sports in the games. It was played from 23 November to 15 December 2006. In this competition, 20 teams participated in the men's competition and 6 teams played in the women's tournament. The events were held at the Basketball Indoor Hall.

The Philippines national basketball team, winners of four gold medals in previous Games, did not participate in the basketball competition due to their suspension by the International Basketball Federation (FIBA). The political interference and conflict between the Basketball Association of the Philippines (BAP) and Philippine Olympic Committee (POC) was the cause of the suspension.

== Schedule ==
Q	Qualification	P	Preliminary round	C	Classification	¼	Quarterfinals	½	Semifinals	F	Finals

Event↓/Date →	23rd Thu	24th Fri	25th Sat	26th Sun	27th Mon	28th Tue	29th Wed	30th Thu	1st Fri	2nd Sat	3rd Sun	4th Mon	5th Tue	6th Wed	7th Thu	8th Fri	9th Sat	10th Sun	11th Mon	12th Tue	13th Wed	14th Thu	15th Fri
Men	Q	Q		Q				P		P	P	P	P	P	P	P	P	P		¼	½	C	F
Women												P	P	P	P	P	P		½			F	

== Medalists ==
Event	Gold	Silver	Bronze
Men	China; Hu Xuefeng; Liu Wei; Zhang Jingsong; Wang Shipeng; Zhu Fangyu; Sun Yue; Li Nan; Yi Jianlian; Mo Ke; Tang Zhengdong; Wang Zhizhi; Li Ke	Qatar; Khalid Masoud; Malek Saleem; Saad Abdulrahman; Daoud Musa; Khalid Suliman; Ali Turki; Yasseen Ismail; Erfan Ali Saeed; Mohammed Saleem; Mohammed Salaheldin; Hashim Zaidan; Omer Abdelqader	Iran; Pouya Tajik; Amir Amini; Saman Veisi; Mehdi Kamrani; Samad Nikkhah Bahrami; Iman Zandi; Hamed Afagh; Alireza Honardoust; Aidin Nikkhah Bahrami; Karam Ahmadian; Mousa Nabipour; Hamed Haddadi
Women	China; Song Xiaoyun; Bian Lan; Jia Guang; Zhang Wei; Miao Lijie; Ren Lei; Sui Feifei; Ji Xiao; Chen Xiaoli; Liu Dan; Zhang Xiaoni; Chen Nan	Chinese Taipei; Chen Yi-feng; Chien Wei-chuan; Chiang Feng-chun; Sun Chieh-ping; Lan Jui-yu; Chu Yung-hsu; Wen Chi; Cheng Hui-yun; Lin Hui-mei; Lin Chi-wen; Li Wan-ting; Liu Chun-yi	Japan; Emi Isoyama; Hiromi Suwa; Yuki Morimoto; Yuka Watanabe; Noriko Sakakibara; Akino Nakagawa; Ryoko Utsumi; Eriko Hata; Asami Yoshida; Yuko Oga; Kumiko Yamada

== Medal table ==
Rank	Nation	Gold	Silver	Bronze	Total
1	China (CHN)	2	0	0	2
2	Chinese Taipei (TPE)	0	1	0	1
2	Qatar (QAT)	0	1	0	1
4	Iran (IRI)	0	0	1	1
4	Japan (JPN)	0	0	1	1
Totals (5 entries)		2	2	2	6

== Draw ==
The teams were seeded based on their final ranking at the 2005 FIBA Asia Championship and 2005 FIBA Asia Championship for Women.

=== Men ===
Twelve lower-ranked teams had to play in Round 1; 12 other teams qualify directly for the tournament proper.

Round 1 – Group A

- India (12)
- Macau
- Bahrain

Round 1 – Group B

- Uzbekistan (11)
- Palestine
- Mongolia

Round 1 – Group C

- Hong Kong (15)
- Syria
- Afghanistan

Round 1 – Group D

- Kuwait (13)
- Chinese Taipei*
- United Arab Emirates

Preliminary – Group E

- Qatar (Host)
- South Korea (4)
- Iran (6)
- Jordan (7)
- 1st Round 1 – Group A
- 1st Round 1 – Group B

Preliminary – Group F

- China (1)
- Lebanon (2)
- Japan (5)
- Kazakhstan (10)*
- 1st Round 1 – Group C
- 1st Round 1 – Group D

* Chinese Taipei despite finishing 9th was unseeded in original draw but later replaced Kazakhstan in preliminary round.

=== Women ===
Group X

- China (1)
- Japan (4)
- ~~India (10)~~*
- Lebanon

Group Y

- South Korea (2)
- Thailand (5)
- ~~Kazakhstan (7)~~*
- Chinese Taipei

* Withdrew.

== Final standing ==
=== Men ===
Rank	Team	Pld	W	L
1st place, gold medalist(s)	China	8	8	0
2nd place, silver medalist(s)	Qatar	8	6	2
3rd place, bronze medalist(s)	Iran	8	5	3
4	Jordan	8	5	3
5	South Korea	8	5	3
6	Japan	8	4	4
7	Kazakhstan	10	6	4
8	Chinese Taipei	8	3	5
9	Lebanon	7	3	4
10	Syria	9	4	5
11	Uzbekistan	9	3	6
12	Bahrain	9	2	7
13	Afghanistan	2	1	1
13	Macau	2	1	1
13	Mongolia	2	1	1
13	United Arab Emirates	2	1	1
17	Hong Kong	2	0	2
17	India	2	0	2
17	Kuwait	2	0	2
17	Palestine	2	0	2

=== Women ===
Rank	Team	Pld	W	L
1st place, gold medalist(s)	China	4	4	0
2nd place, silver medalist(s)	Chinese Taipei	4	3	1
3rd place, bronze medalist(s)	Japan	4	2	2
4	South Korea	4	1	3
5	Thailand	3	1	2
6	Lebanon	3	0	3
