= Basketball at the 1998 Asian Games =

- Venue: Thammasat Gymnasium 1 Suphan Buri Provincial Gymnasium
- Date: 8–19 December 1998
- Nations: 12

Basketball was one of the many sports which was held at the 1998 Asian Games in Bangkok, Thailand between 8 December and 19 December 1998. China again swept all their assignments en route to their 5th title in the men's tournament, while Japan notched their 2nd title after thrashing China in the women's final.

== Schedule ==
P	Preliminary round	S	Second round	C	Classification	½	Semifinals	F	Finals

Event↓/Date →	8th Tue	9th Wed	10th Thu	11th Fri	12th Sat	13th Sun	14th Mon	15th Tue	16th Wed	17th Thu	18th Fri	19th Sat
Men	P	P	P		P	C	S	S	S	C	½	F
Women	P	P	P		P	P		C	½		F	

== Medalists ==
Event	Gold	Silver	Bronze
Men	China; Fan Bin; Gong Xiaobin; Hu Weidong; Li Nan; Li Xiaoyong; Liu Qiang; Liu Yudong; Mengke Bateer; Sun Jun; Wang Zhizhi; Zhang Jingsong; Zhang Wenqi	South Korea; Cho Sang-hyun; Choo Seung-gyun; Hyun Joo-yup; Jung Jae-kun; Kang Dong-hee; Kim Byong-chul; Kim Joo-sung; Kim Sung-chul; Lee Eun-ho; Lee Sang-min; Moon Kyung-eun; Seo Jang-hoon	Philippines; Johnny Abarrientos; Marlou Aquino; Allan Caidic; Kenneth Duremdes; Dennis Espino; E. J. Feihl; Jojo Lastimosa; Jun Limpot; Vergel Meneses; Alvin Patrimonio; Olsen Racela; Andy Seigle
Women	Japan; Noriko Hamaguchi; Rie Hattori; Kaori Kawakami; Satomi Miki; Mutsuko Nagata; Akemi Okazato; Taeko Oyama; Chisako Shimada; Yuko Tsukahara; Kagari Yamada; Kumiko Yamada; Mayumi Yoshiyama	China; Chen Bin; Sui Feifei; Jiang Xu; Liu Yuexiu; Ma Chengqing; Ma Zongqing; Miao Bo; Miao Lijie; Pan Wei; Wang Fuying; Wang Ling; Zheng Dongmei	South Korea; Cho Hey-jin; Chun Joo-weon; Hong Jung-ae; Jang Sun-hyoung; Jung Sun-min; Kim Ji-yoon; Kim Kwe-ryong; Lee Eun-young; Lee Jong-ae; Park Jung-eun; Yang Hee-youn; Yoo Young-joo

== Medal table ==
Rank	Nation	Gold	Silver	Bronze	Total
1	China (CHN)	1	1	0	2
2	Japan (JPN)	1	0	0	1
3	South Korea (KOR)	0	1	1	2
4	Philippines (PHI)	0	0	1	1
Totals (4 entries)		2	2	2	6

== Final standing ==
=== Men ===
Rank	Team	Pld	W	L
1st place, gold medalist(s)	China	7	7	0
2nd place, silver medalist(s)	South Korea	7	6	1
3rd place, bronze medalist(s)	Philippines	7	5	2
4	Kazakhstan	7	3	4
5	Chinese Taipei	6	4	2
6	Thailand	6	2	4
7	Iran	6	2	4
8	United Arab Emirates	6	1	5
9	Uzbekistan	5	3	2
10	Japan	5	2	3
11	Hong Kong	5	1	4
12	Kyrgyzstan	5	0	5

=== Women ===
Rank	Team	Pld	W	L
1st place, gold medalist(s)	Japan	4	4	0
2nd place, silver medalist(s)	China	4	2	2
3rd place, bronze medalist(s)	South Korea	5	4	1
4	Chinese Taipei	5	2	3
5	Kazakhstan	4	2	2
6	Philippines	3	0	3
7	Thailand	3	0	3
