= Kim Ji-yoon =

Kim Ji-yoon may refer to:

- Kim Ji-yoon (basketball)
- Kim Ji-yoon (curler)
