= Jan Stirling =

Australian basketball player and coach

Personal information
- Born: 20 July 1955 (age 71) Adelaide, South Australia

Sport
- Country: Australia
- Sport: Women's basketball
Medal record
Representing Australia
Olympic Games
Silver medal – second place	2004 Athens	Team competition
Silver medal – second place	2008 Beijing	Team competition
World Championship
Gold medal – first place	2006 Brazil

Jan Stirling (née Graham; born 20 July 1955) is a former Australian women's basketball player and coach.

She played for the Australia women's national basketball team during the 1970s and competed for Australia at the 1975 World Championship held in Colombia. In the domestic Women's National Basketball League (WNBL), Stirling played 163 games for North Adelaide Rockets.

Following her retirement in 1991, Stirling went on to become a successful basketball coach. She led Adelaide Lightning to 12 straight Women's National Basketball League (WNBL) finals appearances between 1993 and 2004 and five consecutive Grand Final appearances resulting in four Championships. Stirling was WNBL Coach of the Year in 1993. She became an assistant coach of the Opals in 1994 and became head coach in 2001, the first time an Australian former player, and a woman, had ever taken charge of the Opals. In 2004, Stirling quit the Lightning to concentrate full-time on coaching the Opals.

Stirling had immediate success as national coach, winning a bronze medal at the 2002 World Championships in China. She then led the Opals to silver medal at the 2004 Olympics in Athens, to gold at the 2006 Commonwealth Games in Melbourne, gold at the 2006 FIBA world championship in Brazil and silver at the Beijing Olympics in 2008. As a result, Stirling has been described as Australia's most successful basketball coach.

Following the 2008 Olympics, Stirling stepped down as the Opals head coach, becoming a consultant to the Russian Basketball Federation. Since 2010, Stirling has been assisting Port Adelaide Power with their Leadership program. In November 2010, Basketball Australia appointed Stirling as manager of the national program of the Australian Women's Wheelchair Basketball Program. Stirling was awarded a Member of the Order of Australia (AM) in 2008 for her contribution to sport - as an elite coach, player and as a contributor to professional development and the community.

In 2013, Stirling was elected to the Australian Basketball Hall of Fame. She was inducted into the FIBA Hall of Fame, in 2015.
