= Natsumi Yabuuchi =

Japanese basketball player

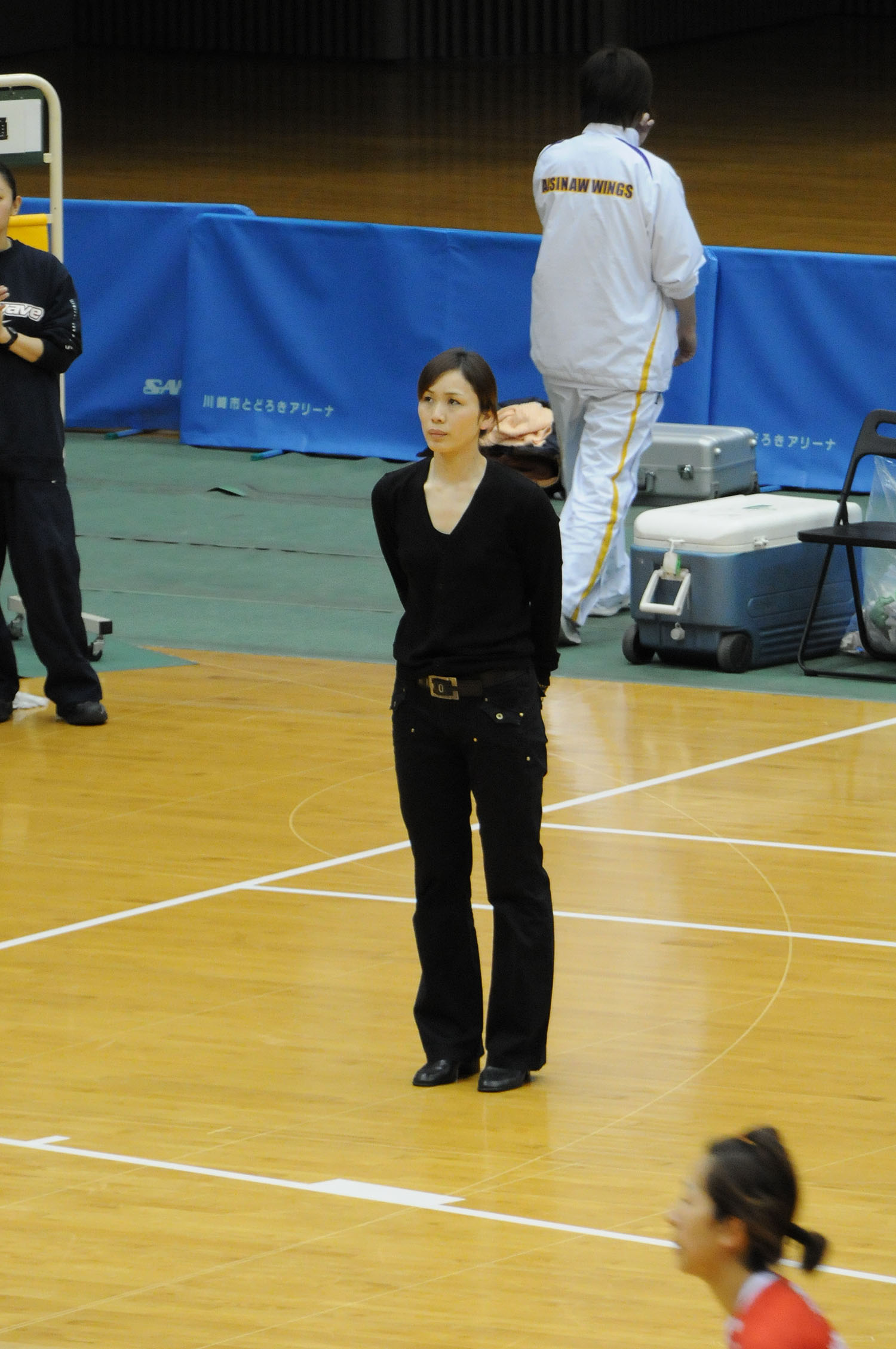
Natsumi Yabuuchi

Natsumi Yabuuchi (薮内夏美, born 21 July 1977) is a Japanese former basketball player who competed in the 2004 Summer Olympics.

Born: Jul 21, 1977 in Osaka

Height: 175 cm / 5.7 feet

Positions: Point Guard

Previous teams : Japan (W) ()
