= Shiba Maggon =

Indian basketball coach (born 1976)

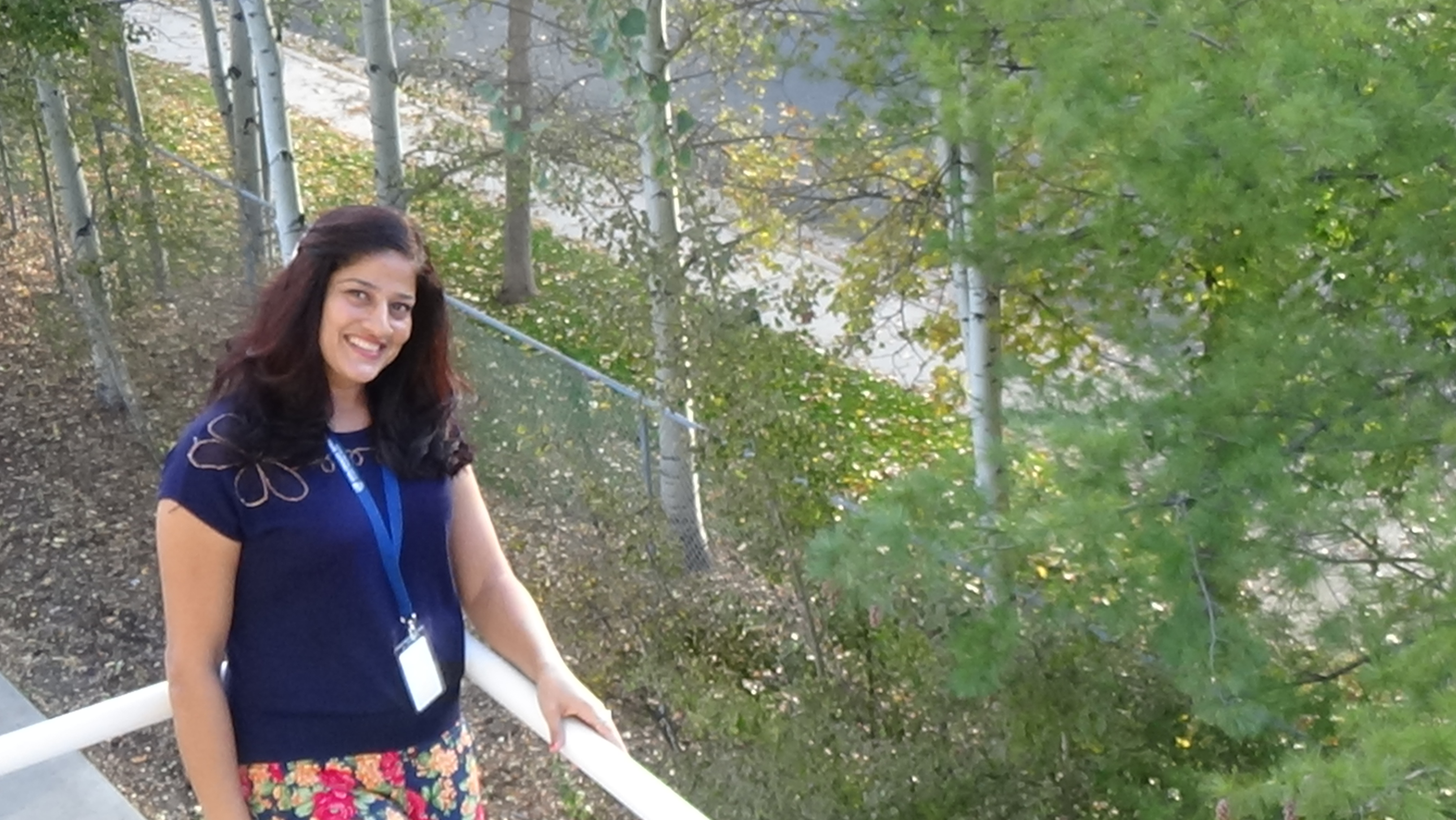
- Shiba Maggon in 2014
- Born: 16 March 1976 (age 50); Karnal, Haryana, India
- Education: Sec 18 school, Chandigarh
- Alma mater: Punjab University, Chandigarh (1996); Southwestern Oklahoma State University - Athletic Training - Weatherford, Oklahoma (2000); Maharishi Dayanand Saraswati University, Ajmer; International Olympic Academy, Young Athlete sessions (2008); Diploma in American Sports Education, George Mason University, Fairfax, Virginia (2010) Honours in International coaching enrichment Certificate program
- Occupations: Coach Senior Women Team FIBA Asia Cup 2019,Coach Senior Women Commonwealth Games 2018, Head Coach Asian Games Senior Women Team 2018. Head Coach Senior Women Team William Jones Cup 2018, Coach Senior Women Team FIBA Asia Cup 2017,Coach Senior Women Team William Jones Cup 2017, Head Coach Junior Women Team 2016, Coach Junior Indian Women Team 2012 and 2010, Coach Youth Indian Women Team 2011; FIBA Referee, Lead Coordinator NBA (Delhi)
- Known for: Famously called Queen of Basketball
- Website: www.shibamaggon.in

Shiba Maggon (Hindi:'शीबा मग्गोन', born 16 March 1976 ) is an Indian basketball player who played for the India national team. She is currently the coach for the Indian Senior women Team, as well as an international referee. She was one of the first women to qualify as a referee.

== Early life ==
Shiba started playing basketball since 1989. She played for Sports Authority of India (SAI). In 1992, she was selected for the Indian Junior team. Shiba had her initial schooling days in Karnal and later joined SAI at Chandigarh and stayed there till 1996. She later joined Western Railways, Ajmer in 1996 and was with them till 2002. In 2002 Shiba joined MTNL Delhi and played with them till Jan 2011. She has agreed to be basketball mentor for Indian Collegiate Athletic Program. She is Technical Director for Kooh Sports, and Director for Poshac a Pan India program.

== National achievements ==
Maggon has a list of basketball achievements leading back to her Youth days. She has won the following medals in her career:

- One Gold medal in 1991 in Youth category
- One Gold medal in 1993 and a Silver medal in 1994 and bronze in 1991 Junior Category.

Shiba Maggon went on to play a total of 20 Senior Nationals starting from 1989 till 2010. Listed below are some of her achievements in the Senior category:

- Six Gold medals at Sr National Championship playing for Indian Railways, Year 1997 to 2002
- One Gold Medal and Eight Silver Medals at Sr National Championship playing for Delhi, Year 2003 to 2011.
- Seven federation cups Three Gold, one Silver and Three Bronze medals
- Two Gold Medals and One Bronze Medal at All India University level.
- Two Bronze Medals at National Games 1994 and 2002
- One Gold Medal at Rural Nationals representing Haryana.
- Shiba was also awarded Best player several times at Major Championships and made Hattrick at PNC All India championship to sweep away the Best player Award.
- She was a consistent player and a consistent scorer for the past 20 years, scoring an average of 20 points for the last championship.

== International career and achievements ==
- Maggon has played in five FIBA Asian Championships for Women and was ranked in the top 5 for Asian players in 2002.
- Maggon was also part of Indian Team to take part at Commonwealth Games at Australia in 2006.
- After her retirement as Player Maggon continued to coach Team from the year 2010 to 2019.
- Under able guidance under 18 women team India qualified to level 1 in 2012.
- Maggon was also Coach for Team India at Commonwealth and Asian Games 2018.
- Miss Maggon also got a scholarship to the Southwestern Oklahoma State University in 1998. She majored in Physical Education.
- Maggon applied for a Diploma Course in Olympism and Humanism with the International Olympic Academy and successfully finished the Diploma at the historic city, Athens. Maggon was chosen to represent the whole world and give a vote of thanks speech on behalf of the 98 countries who were taking part in that sessions.
- Maggon is credited as being the first Indian woman to be an international FIBA certified referee, along with Maharashtrian Snehal Bendke. She is also an international coach, part-time voice over commentator and has worked in the past with NBA in India.
