= Dominique Tonnerre =

French basketball player (born 1974)

Personal information
- Born: May 23, 1974 (age 52)
Medals
Representing France
European Championships
Gold medal – first place	2001 France	Team

Dominique Tonnerre (born 23 May 1974) is a French former basketball player who competed in the 2000 Summer Olympics.
