= Nataša Anđelić =

Serbian basketball player

Personal information
- Born: July 11, 1977 (age 49) Novi Sad, SFR Yugoslavia
- Listed height: 1.80 m (5 ft 11 in)
- Listed weight: 75 kg (165 lb)

Career information
- WNBA draft: 1999: undrafted
- Playing career: –2011
- Position: Shooting guard / small forward

Career history
- –2000: Vojvodina
- 2000–2001: Crvena zvezda
- 2001–2002: Budućnost Podgorica
- 2002–2003: Hemofarm
- 2003–2004: Dynamo Moscow
- 2004–2005: Ares Ribera
- 2005–2007: Dynamo Moscow
- 2007: Elitzur Ramla
- 2008–2009: Pozzuoli
- 2009–2010: ASDG Comense 1872
- 2010–2011: Čelik Zenica
- 2011: Keravnos

Nataša Anđelić (Serbian Cyrillic: Наташа Анђелић, born July 11, 1977, in Novi Sad, SFR Yugoslavia) is a former Serbian female basketball player.
