= Monika Veselovski =

Serbian basketball player

Personal information
- Born: 1 December 1977 (age 48) Novi Sad, SFR Yugoslavia
- Listed height: 1.83 m (6 ft 0 in)

Career information
- WNBA draft: 1999: undrafted
- Playing career: –2016
- Position: Shooting guard

Career history
- 2000–2002: PZU Polfa Pabianice
- 2002–2003: Elitzur Ramle
- 2003–2004: Budućnost Podgorica
- 2004–2005: Lotos Clima Gdynia
- 2005–2006: Ramat Hasharon
- 2006–2007: Lotos Clima Gdynia
- 2007–2008: Hondarribia-Irún
- 2008: Mladi Krajišnik
- 2008–2010: Šibenik
- 2010: Herner TC
- 2010–2011: AEL Limassol
- 2011–2012: Čelik Zenica
- 2012–2013: Trogylos Basket
- 2014–2015: Spartak Subotica
- 2015–2016: Keravnos

Monika Veselovski (Serbian Cyrillic: Моника Веселовски; born 1 December 1977) is a Serbian female professional basketball player.
