= Zhang Wei (basketball) =

Chinese basketball player

Medal record

Women's basketball

Representing China

Asian Games
Gold medal – first place	2006 Doha	Team competition
Gold medal – first place	2010 Guangzhou	Team competition

East Asian Games
Gold medal – first place	2009 Hong Kong	Team competition

Zhang Wei (simplified Chinese: 张伟; traditional Chinese: 張伟; pinyin: Zhāng Wěi; born 12 February 1986 in Liaoning) is a female Chinese basketball player who was part of the teams that won gold medals at the 2006 Asian Games and the 2010 Asian Games. She competed at the 2008 Summer Olympics in Beijing. She is the twin sister of Zhang Yu.
