= Isabel Sánchez =

Spanish basketball player

Isabel Sánchez (born 28 November 1976) is a Spanish basketball player who competed in the 2008 Summer Olympics. The Spanish basketball team had placed fifth in their Olympics campaign, finishing with three wins and three losses.
