= Chen Luyun =

Chinese basketball player

Personal information
- Born: 7 June 1977
- Died: 23 December 2015 (aged 38)
Medal record
Women's basketball
Representing China
Asian Games
| Gold medal – first place | 2002 Busan | Team competition |

Chen Luyun (simplified Chinese: 陈鹭芸; traditional Chinese: 陳鷺芸; pinyin: Chén Lùyún; 7 June 1977 – 23 December 2015) was a Chinese basketball player who competed in the 2004 Summer Olympics.
