= Choi Youn-ah =

South Korean basketball player

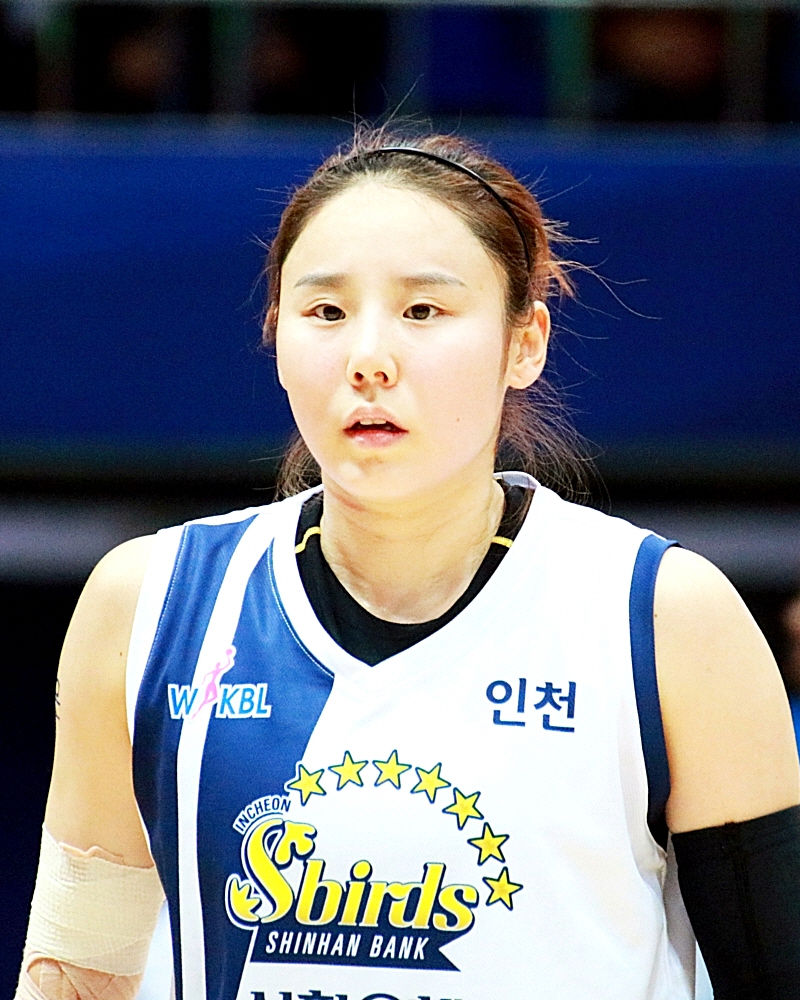

Korean name
- Hangul: 최윤아
- RR: Choe Yuna
- MR: Ch'oe Yuna

Choi Youn-ah (born 24 October 1985) is a South Korean Former basketball player and Current a Coach of Busan BNK Sum. who competed in the 2008 Summer Olympics.
