= Kaori Kusuda =

Japanese basketball player

Medal record

Women's basketball

Representing Japan

Asian Games
| Gold medal – first place | 1998 Bangkok | Team competition |

Kaori Kusuda (née Kawakami, 楠田香穂里、旧姓川上、born 29 May 1974) is a Japanese former basketball player who competed in the 2004 Summer Olympics.
