= Wang Ling (basketball) =

Chinese basketball player

Personal information
- Born: 9 June 1978 (age 48) Liaoyang, China

Wang Ling (Chinese: 王玲; pinyin: Wáng Líng; born 9 June 1978 in Liaoyang) is a Chinese former basketball player who competed in the 2004 Summer Olympics.
