= Lee Eun-ju (basketball) =

South Korean basketball player

- Hangul: 이언주
- RR: I Eonju
- MR: I Ŏnju

Lee Eun-ju
Medal record

Women's basketball

Representing South Korea

Asian Games
Silver medal – second place	2002 Busan	Team competition

Lee Eun-ju (born 28 February 1977 in Sacheon, South Korea) is the associate head coach at the University of Louisiana at Monroe and is a Korean former NCAA basketball player who led Northeast Louisiana University to the 1984 women's NCAA Final Four and competed in the 2000 Summer Olympics.
