= Jang Sun-hyoung =

South Korean basketball player

- Hangul: 장선형
- RR: Jang Seonhyeong
- MR: Chang Sŏnhyŏng

Jang Sun-hyoung
Medal record

Women's basketball

Representing South Korea

Asian Games
Bronze medal – third place	1998 Bangkok	Team competition
Silver medal – second place	2002 Busan	Team competition

Jang Sun-hyoung (born 16 July 1975) is a Korean former basketball player who competed in the 2000 Summer Olympics.
