= Sin Jung-ja =

South Korean basketball player

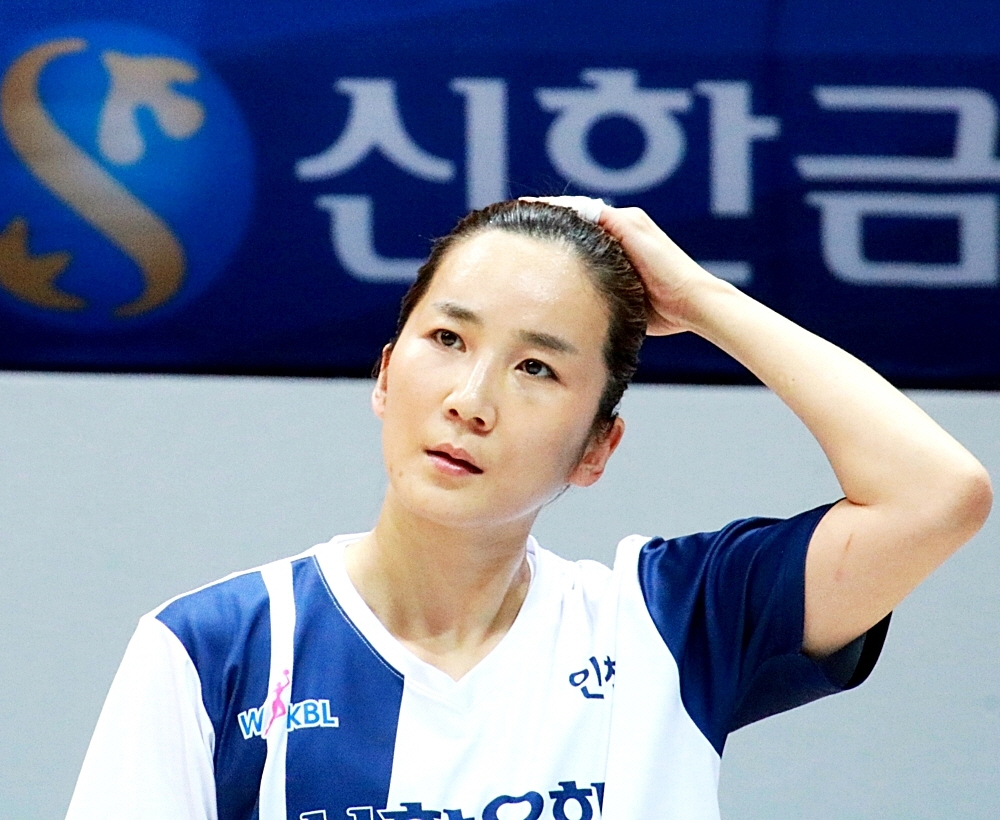
- 여자농구 신한은행 vs 하나외환 직찍

Korean name
- Hangul: 신정자
- RR: Sin Jeongja
- MR: Sin Chŏngja

Sin Jung-ja
Medal record

Women's basketball

Representing South Korea

Asian Games
Silver medal – second place	2010 Guangzhou	Team competition
Gold medal – first place	2014 Incheon	Team competition

Sin Jung-ja (born 11 December 1980) is a Korean basketball player who competed in the 2008 Summer Olympics.
