= Song Xiaoyun =

Chinese basketball player

Personal information
- Native name: 宋晓云
- Born: December 11, 1982 (age 43) Anshan, Liaoning, China
- Height: 1.75 m (5 ft 9 in)

Sport
- Country: China
- Sport: Women's basketball
Medal record
Asian Games
| Gold medal – first place | 2002 Busan | Team competition |
| Gold medal – first place | 2006 Doha | Team competition |

Song Xiaoyun (simplified Chinese: 宋晓云; traditional Chinese: 宋曉雲; pinyin: Sòng Xiǎoyún), born December 11, 1982 in Anshan, Liaoning) is a Chinese basketball player who was part of the teams that won gold medals at the 2002 and 2006 Asian Games. She was part of the Chinese squad at the 2004 Summer Olympics in Athens, the 2008 Summer Olympics in Beijing, and the 2012 Summer Olympics in London.
