= Taeko Oyama =

Japanese basketball player

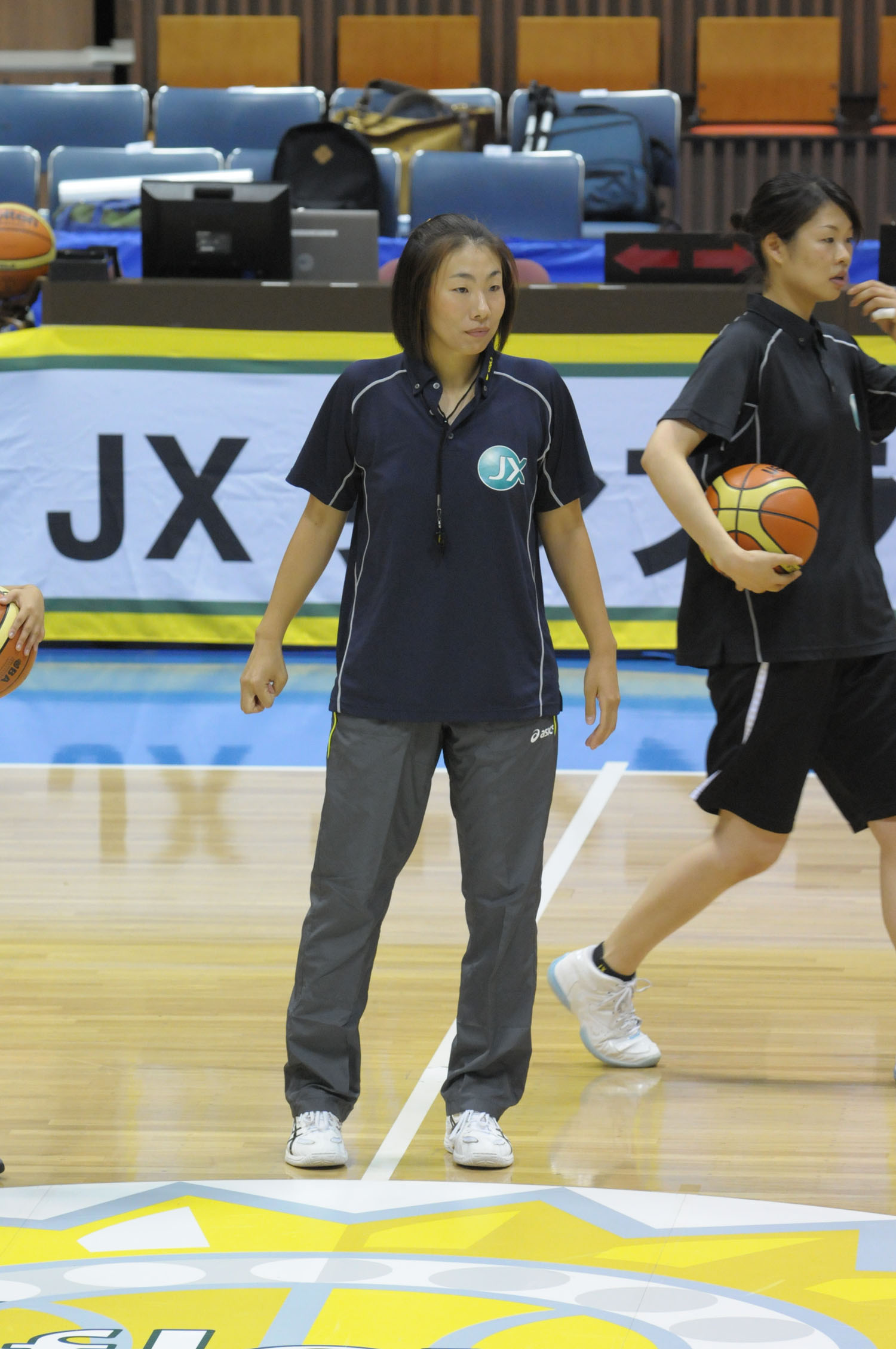

Medal record

Women's basketball

Representing Japan

Asian Games
Silver medal – second place	1994 Hiroshima	Team competition
Gold medal – first place	1998 Bangkok	Team competition

Taeko Oyama (大山妙子, born 18 June 1974) is a Japanese former basketball player who competed in the 1996 Summer Olympics and in the 2004 Summer Olympics.
