= Akemi Okazato =

Japanese basketball player

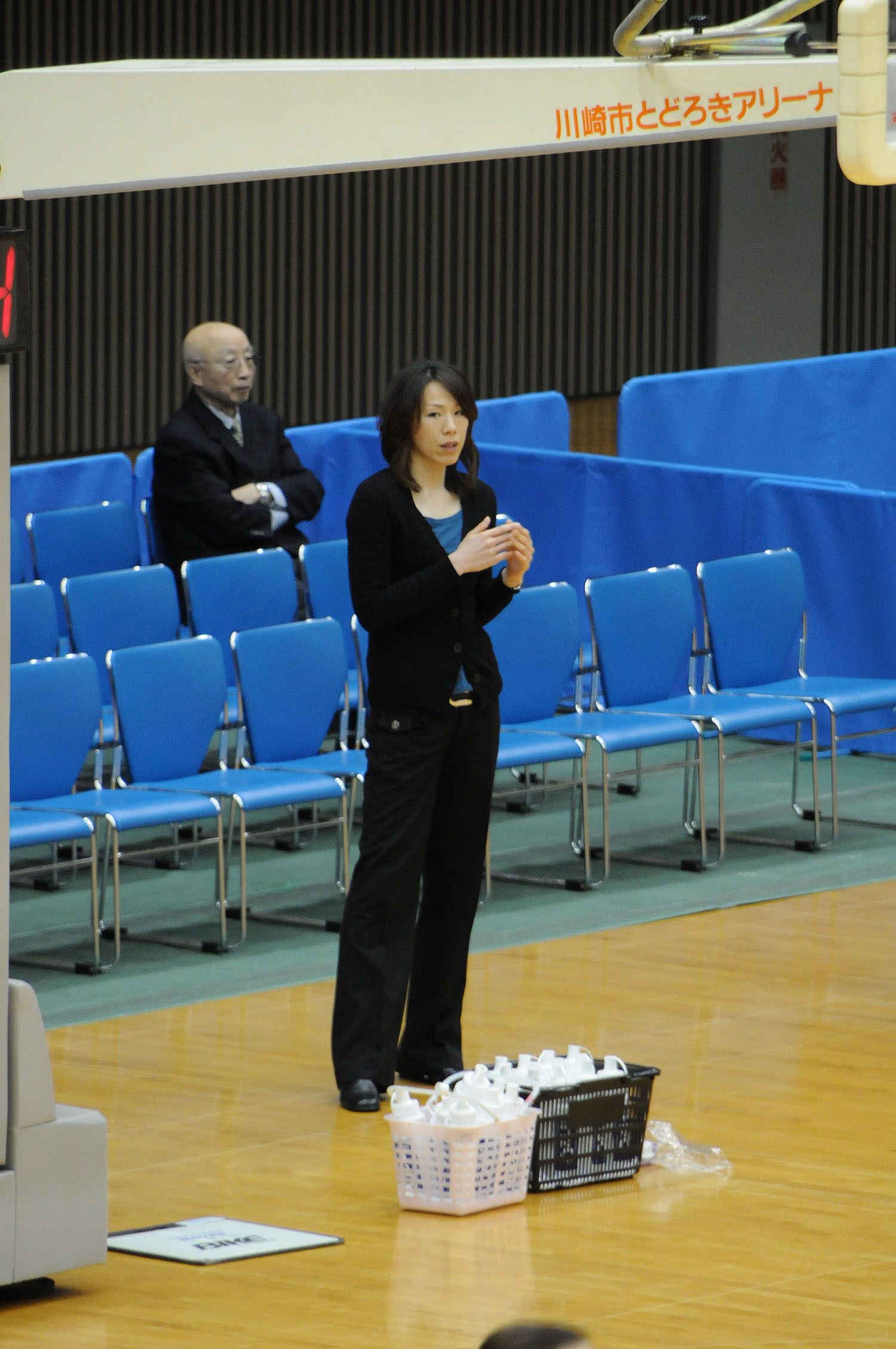
- Akemi Okazato in 2009

Personal information
- Nationality: Japanese
- Born: 24 July 1974 (age 50); Ibaraki, Japan

Sport
- Sport: Basketball

Akemi Okazato (born 24 July 1974) is a Japanese basketball player. She competed in the women's tournament at the 1996 Summer Olympics.
