= Hong Hyun-hee =

South Korean basketball player

Personal information
- Nationality: South Korean
- Born: 24 January 1982 (age 44) Seoul, South Korea
- Occupation: Basketball player
- Height: 191 cm (6.27 ft)
- Weight: 65 kg (143 lb)

Korean name
- Hangul: 홍현희
- RR: Hong Hyeonhui
- MR: Hong Hyŏnhŭi
Medal record
Women's basketball
Representing South Korea
Asian Games
| Silver medal – second place | 2002 Busan | Team competition |

Hong Hyun-hee (born 24 January 1982) is a South Korean former basketball player who competed in the 2004 Summer Olympics.
