= Ren Lei =

Chinese basketball player

Medal record

Women's basketball

Representing China

Asian Games
Gold medal – first place	2002 Busan	Team competition
Gold medal – first place	2006 Doha	Team competition

Ren Lei (Chinese: 任蕾; pinyin: Rén Lěi; born 22 January 1982) is a Chinese basketball player who competed in the 2004 Summer Olympics.
