= Mutsuko Nagata =

Japanese basketball player

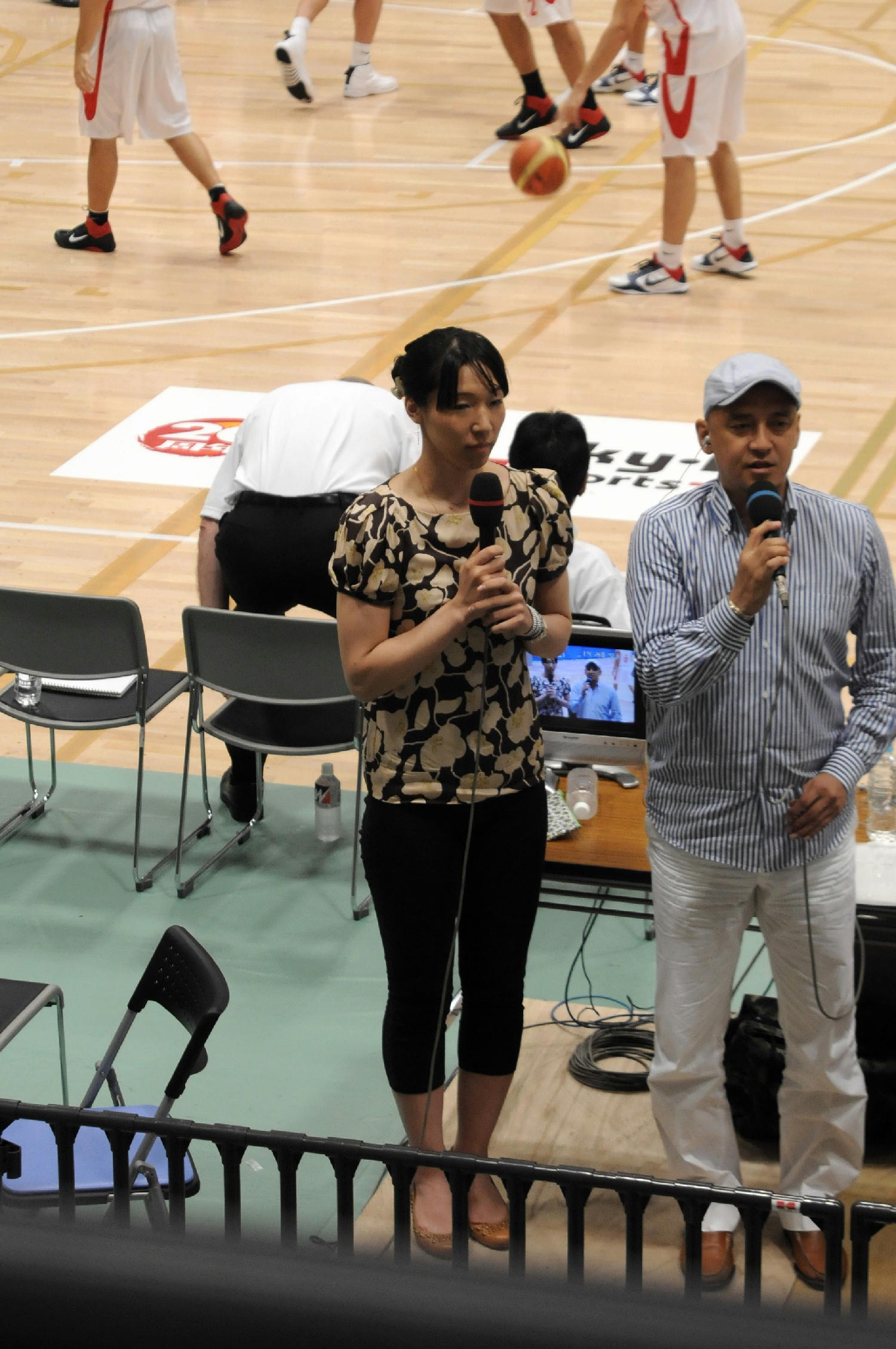

Medal record

Women's basketball

Representing Japan

Asian Games
Gold medal – first place	1998 Bangkok	Team competition

Mutsuko Nagata (永田睦子, born 16 September 1976) is a Japanese former basketball player who competed in the 1996 Summer Olympics and the 2004 Summer Olympics.
