= Chun Joo-weon =

South Korean basketball player

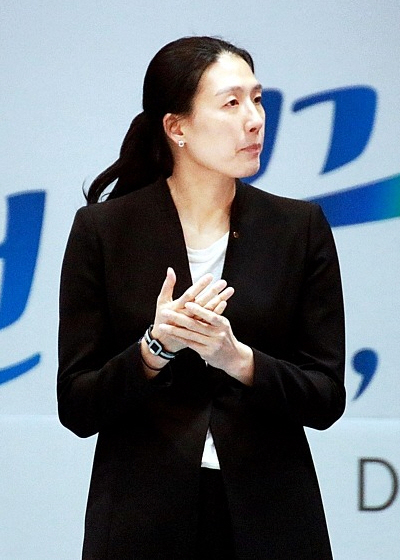

Personal information
- Citizenship: South Korea
- Born: 15 November 1972 (age 53)
- Occupation: Basketball coach
- Height: 176 cm (5 ft 9 in)

Korean name
- Hangul: 전주원
- Hanja: 錢周媛
- RR: Jeon Juwon
- MR: Chŏn Chuwŏn
Medal record
Women's basketball
Representing South Korea
Asian Games
Gold medal – first place	1994 Hiroshima	Team competition
Bronze medal – third place	1998 Bangkok	Team competition
Silver medal – second place	2002 Busan	Team competition

Chun Joo-weon (born 15 November 1972) is a South Korean women's basketball coach and former player.

== Career ==
Chun graduated from Sunil Girls' High School (선일여자고등학교) in 1991, and thereafter joined the Hyundai Electronics women's basketball team. She competed in the 1996 Summer Olympics and in the 2000 Summer Olympics. As of 2013, she is a coach for the Chuncheon Woori Bank team in the Women's Korean Basketball League.
