= Ryoko Yano =

Japanese basketball player

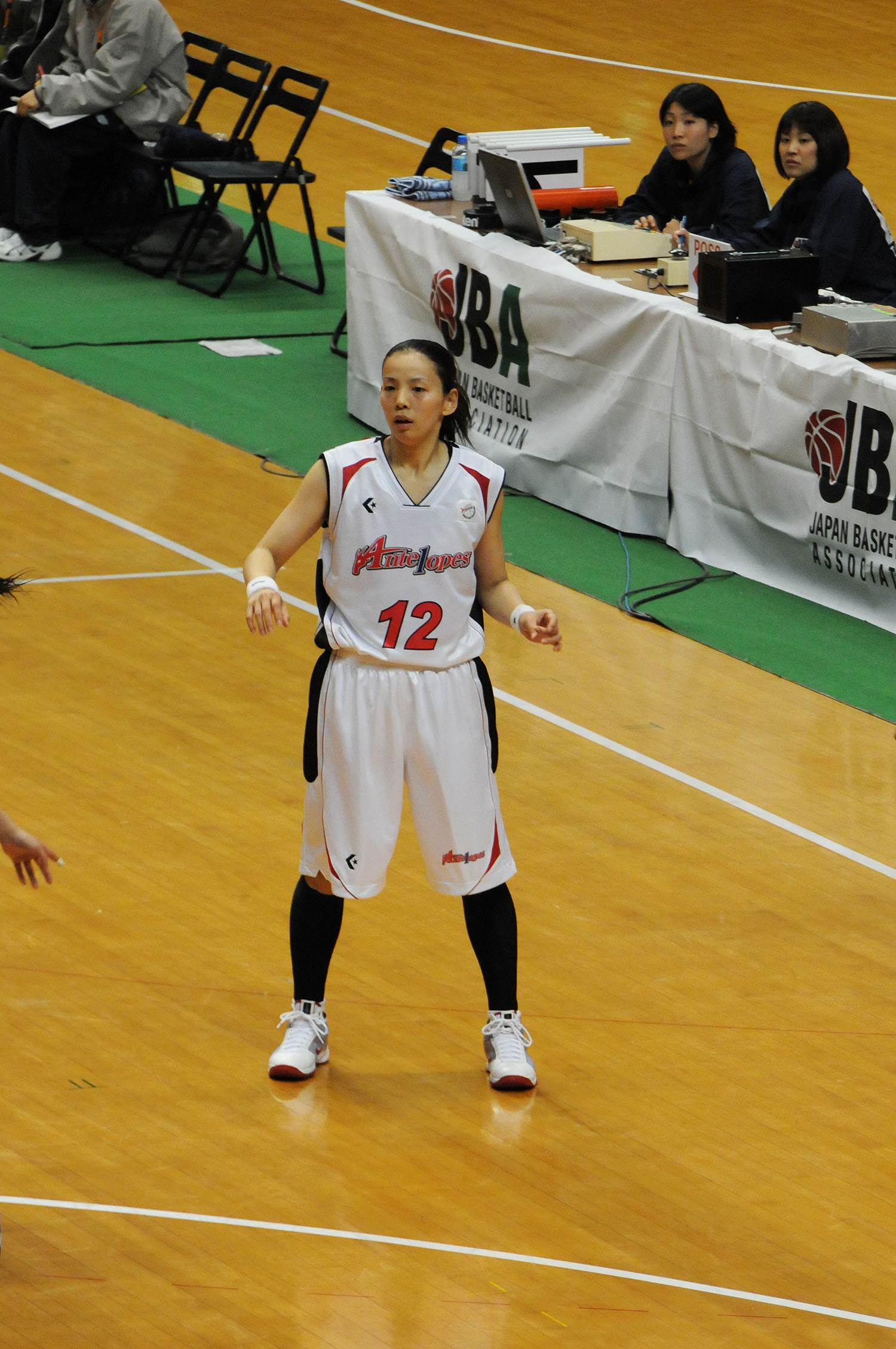
Ryoko Yano

Ryoko Yano (矢野良子, born 20 December 1978) is a Japanese basketball player who competed in the 2004 Summer Olympics.

== Awards ==
- Women's Japan Basketball League
  - Play off MVP（2003-04, 2007-08）
  - Season MVP（2006-07, 2009-10）
