= Chen Xiaoli =

Chinese basketball player

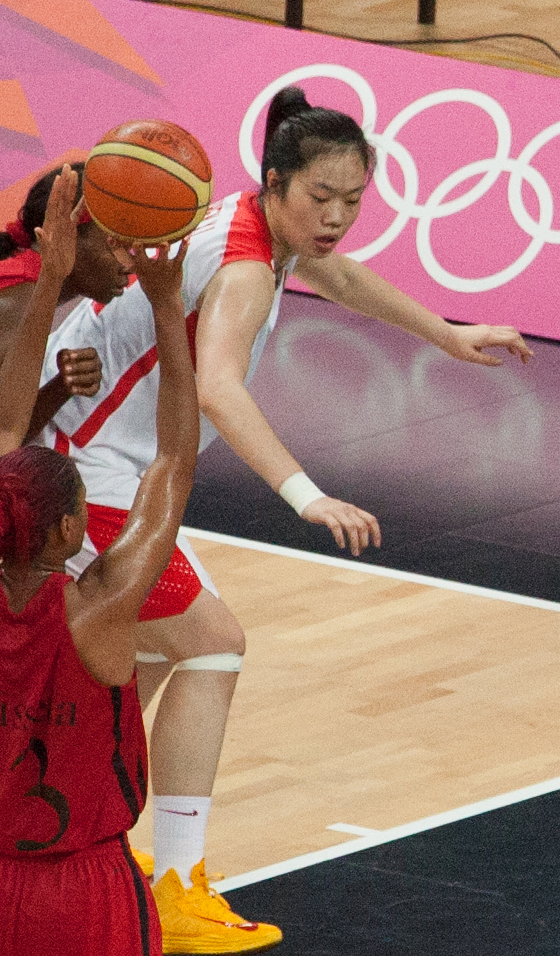
- Chen at the 2012 Summer Olympics

Medal record

Women's basketball

Representing China

Asian Games
Gold medal – first place	2002 Busan	Team competition
Gold medal – first place	2006 Doha	Team competition
Gold medal – first place	2010 Guangzhou	Team competition

Chen Xiaoli (simplified Chinese: 陈晓丽; traditional Chinese: 陳曉麗; pinyin: Chén Xiǎolì; born February 20, 1981 or 1982 in Fuxin, Liaoning) is a female Chinese basketball player who was part of the teams that won gold medals at the 2002 Asian Games, the 2006 Asian Games, and the 2010 Asian Games. She competed at the 2008 Summer Olympics in Beijing and the 2012 Summer Olympics in London.
