= Pan Wei =

Chinese basketball player

Medal record

Women's basketball

Representing China

Asian Games
Silver medal – second place	1998 Bangkok	Team competition
Gold medal – first place	2002 Busan	Team competition

Pan Wei (Chinese: 潘巍; born 11 June 1978) is a Chinese former basketball player who competed in the 2004 Summer Olympics.
