= Noriko Koiso =

Japanese basketball player

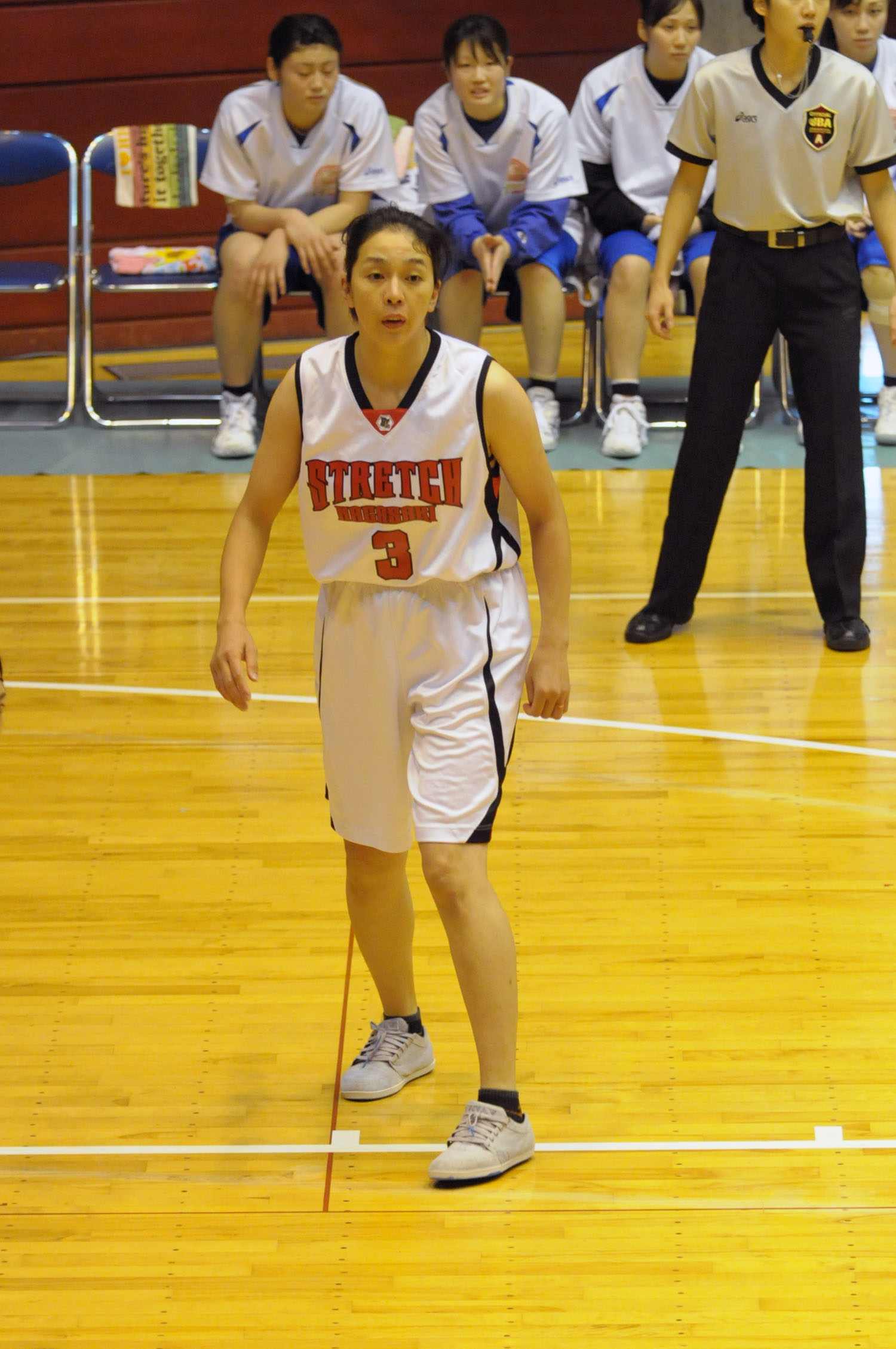

Personal information
- Born: January 15, 1974 (age 52) Nagasaki, Japan
- Listed height: 1.83 m (6 ft 0 in)
- Listed weight: 80 kg (176 lb)
Medals
Women's basketball
Representing Japan
Asian Games
Silver medal – second place	1994 Hiroshima	Team competition
Gold medal – first place	1998 Bangkok	Team competition

Noriko Koiso (née Hamaguchi, 小磯典子、旧姓濱口、born 15 January 1974) is a Japanese former basketball player who competed in the 1996 Summer Olympics and in the 2004 Summer Olympics.
