= Park Jung-eun =

South Korean basketball player (born 1977)

- Hangul: 박정은
- RR: Bak Jeongeun
- MR: Pak Chŏngŭn

Park Jung-eun
Medal record

Women's basketball

Representing South Korea

Asian Games
Bronze medal – third place	1998 Bangkok	Team competition
Silver medal – second place	2002 Busan	Team competition
Silver medal – second place	2010 Guangzhou	Team competition

Park Jung-eun (born 14 January 1977 in Busan) is a South Korean basketball player who competed in the 1996 Summer Olympics, the 2000 Summer Olympics, the 2004 Summer Olympics, and the 2008 Summer Olympics.

Park is married to actor Han Sang-jin.
