= Jung Sun-min =

South Korean basketball player (born 1974)

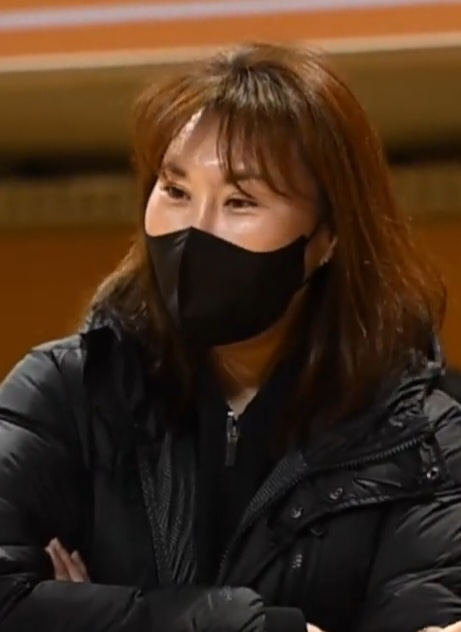

Korean name
- Hangul: 정선민
- RR: Jeong Seonmin
- MR: Chŏng Sŏnmin

Jung Sun-min
Medal record

Women's basketball

Representing South Korea

Asian Games
Gold medal – first place	1994 Hiroshima	Team competition
Bronze medal – third place	1998 Bangkok	Team competition
Silver medal – second place	2002 Busan	Team competition

Jung Sun-min (born 12 October 1974) is a South Korean former basketball player who competed in the 1996 Summer Olympics, the 2000 Summer Olympics, and the 2008 Summer Olympics.

Sun-Min was drafted 8th overall by the Seattle Storm in the 2003 WNBA draft making her the first player from South Korea to be drafted by a WNBA team.

During her WNBA career, Sun-Min played for a total of 118 minutes, had a 3-point attempt rate of .219, and completed 13 of 32 field goal attempts.

== WNBA career statistics ==
Legend
GP	Games played	GS	Games started	MPG	Minutes per game	RPG	Rebounds per game
APG	Assists per game	SPG	Steals per game	BPG	Blocks per game	PPG	Points per game
TO	Turnovers per game	FG%	Field-goal percentage	3P%	3-point field-goal percentage	FT%	Free-throw percentage
**Bold**	Career best	°	League leader

=== Regular season ===
Year	Team	GP	GS	MPG	FG%	3P%	FT%	RPG	APG	SPG	BPG	TO	PPG
2003	Seattle	17	0	6.9	.406	.000	1.000	0.6	0.1	0.3	0.0	0.3	1.8
Career	1 years, 1 team	17	0	6.9	.406	.000	1.000	0.6	0.1	0.3	0.0	0.3	1.8
