= Kim Ji-yoon (basketball) =

South Korean basketball player

- Hangul: 김지윤
- RR: Gim Jiyun
- MR: Kim Chiyun

Kim Ji-yoon
Medal record

Women's basketball

Representing South Korea

Asian Games
Bronze medal – third place	1998 Bangkok	Team competition
Silver medal – second place	2002 Busan	Team competition
Silver medal – second place	2010 Guangzhou	Team competition

Kim Ji-yoon (born 7 February 1976) is a South Korean former basketball player who competed in the 1996 Summer Olympics and in the 2000 Summer Olympics.
