= Lee Jong-ae =

South Korean basketball player

- Hangul: 이종애
- RR: I Jongae
- MR: I Chongae

Lee Jong-ae
Medal record

Women's basketball

Representing South Korea

Asian Games
Bronze medal – third place	1998 Bangkok	Team competition
Silver medal – second place	2002 Busan	Team competition

Lee Jong-ae (born 18 March 1975 in Incheon, South Korea) is a Korean former basketball player who competed in the 1996 Summer Olympics, the 2000 Summer Olympics, the 2004 Summer Olympics, and the 2008 Summer Olympics.
