= Chien Wei-chuan =

Taiwanese basketball coach and player

- Traditional Chinese: 錢薇娟
- Simplified Chinese: 钱薇娟
Transcriptions
Standard Mandarin
- Hanyu Pinyin: Qián Wēijuān
- Wade–Giles: Ch'ien^{2} Wei^{1}-chüan^{1}

Chien Wei-chuan
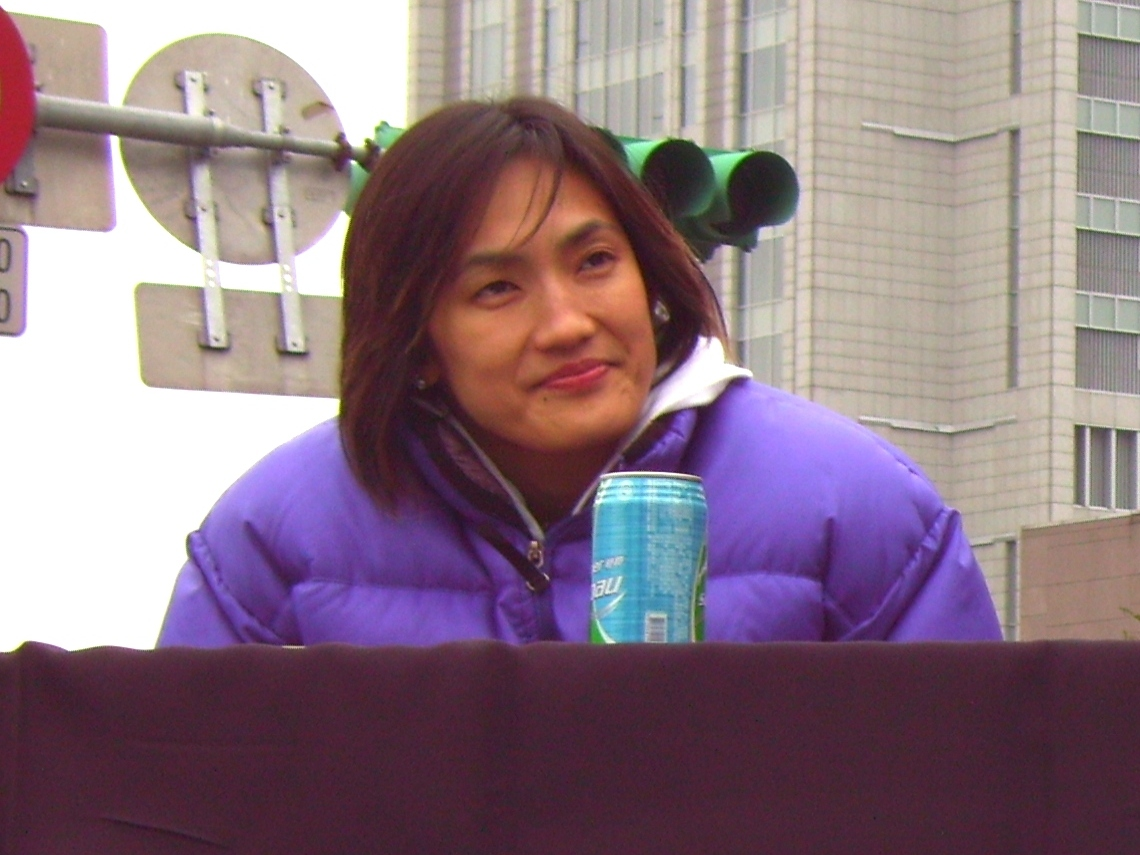
- Chien in 2007

Medal record

Women's basketball

Representing Chinese Taipei

Asian Games
Bronze medal – third place	1990 Beijing	Team competition
Bronze medal – third place	2002 Busan	Team competition
Silver medal – second place	2006 Doha	Team competition

Chien Wei-chuan (born 8 March 1971), also known as Rosa Chien, is a Taiwanese basketball coach and former player, widely considered the best female basketball player in Taiwanese history. She played on the Chinese Taipei women's national basketball team from 1988 to 2008, taking part in 10 FIBA Asia Championship for Women. She was previously the commissioner of the T1 League.

Chien became the youngest Taiwanese basketball player ever to make the national team at age 15. In the 1993 Summer Universiade, she set a record by scoring 84 points in a 117-35 blowout win against Hong Kong. In 1999, she tried out for the Orlando Miracle in the Women's National Basketball Association, but failed to make the cut. In 2002, she became the first Taiwanese player to play in the Women's Chinese Basketball Association (WCBA), where she played for 5 seasons. She finished her career in Taiwan's Women's Super Basketball League (WSBL). She was also the oldest player ever to represent Chinese Taipei when she played in the 2008 FIBA World Olympic Qualifying Tournament for Women, and at the age of 37, still averaged 20 points per game.

Chien has released a Mandopop album in 1996 and acted in the 2012 drama film Cha Cha for Twins. In 2012, she ran for a seat in New Taipei City at the Taiwanese legislative election, representing the Chinese Nationalist Party, but lost to Lin Shu-fen.

On August 6, 2022, she was announced as the commissioner of the T1 League.

== Filmography ==
Year	English title	Chinese title	Role	Notes
1998	The Candidate	為人民服務	Basketball player	
2012	Cha Cha for Twins	寶米恰恰	Herself	
