= Miao Bo =

Chinese basketball player

Personal information
- Nationality: Chinese
- Born: 17 June 1975 (age 50); Weihai, China

Sport
- Sport: Basketball

Miao Bo (Chinese: 苗波; pinyin: Miáo Bō; born 17 June 1975) is a Chinese basketball player. She competed in the women's tournament at the 1996 Summer Olympics.
