= Zhang Xiaoni =

Chinese basketball player

Personal information
- Born: October 29, 1983 (age 43) Yantai, Shandong, China
Medals
Women's basketball
Representing China
Asian Games
Gold medal – first place	2002 Busan	Team competition
Gold medal – first place	2006 Doha	Team competition

Zhang Xiaoni (Chinese: 张晓妮; born October 29, 1983, in Yantai, Shandong) is a female Chinese basketball player who was part of the teams that won gold medals at the 2002 Asian Games and the 2006 Asian Games. She also competed at the 2008 Summer Olympics in Beijing.
