= Beon Yeon-ha =

South Korean basketball player

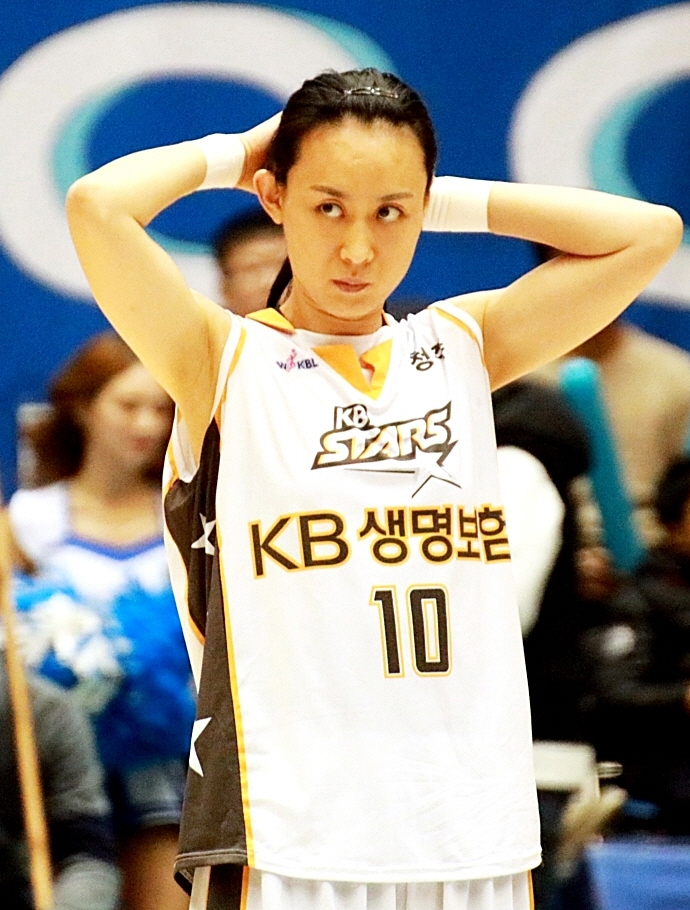
- Photo of Beon Yeon-ha

Korean name
- Hangul: 변연하
- RR: Byeon Yeonha
- MR: Pyŏn Yŏnha

Beon Yeon-ha
Medal record

Women's basketball

Representing South Korea

Asian Games
Silver medal – second place	2002 Busan	Team competition
Silver medal – second place	2010 Guangzhou	Team competition
Gold medal – first place	2014 Incheon	Team competition

Beon Yeon-ha (born 7 March 1980) is a Korean basketball player who competed in the 2004 Summer Olympics and in the 2008 Summer Olympics.
