= Kim Kwe-ryong =

South Korean basketball player

- Hangul: 김계령
- RR: Gim Gyeryeong
- MR: Kim Kyeryŏng

Kim Kwe-ryong
Medal record

Women's basketball

Representing South Korea

Asian Games
Bronze medal – third place	1998 Bangkok	Team competition
Silver medal – second place	2002 Busan	Team competition
Silver medal – second place	2010 Guangzhou	Team competition

Kim Kwe-ryong (born 17 December 1979 in Seoul, South Korea) is a Korean former basketball player who competed in the 2004 Summer Olympics and the 2008 Summer Olympics.
