= Sui Feifei =

Chinese basketball player

Personal information
- Born: January 29, 1979 (age 47) Qingdao, Shandong, China
- Listed height: 184 cm (6 ft 0 in)
- Listed weight: 73 kg (161 lb)

Career history
- 2005: Sacramento Monarchs
- Stats at Basketball Reference
Medals
Women's basketball
Representing China
Asian Games
Silver medal – second place	1998 Bangkok	Team competition
Gold medal – first place	2002 Busan	Team competition
Gold medal – first place	2006 Doha	Team competition

Sui Feifei (Chinese: 隋菲菲; pinyin: Suí Fēifēi; born January 29, 1979) is a Chinese former basketball player who was signed with the Sacramento Monarchs of the WNBA. She was born and raised in Qingdao, Shandong in the People's Republic of China, and is 1.84 m (6 ft 1 in.) tall.

She was the MVP of the 2004–2005 WCBA season, where she led her team Bayi China Telecom to three consecutive championships. Sui was named the Women's Chinese Basketball Association's most popular player in 2002 and 2003.

On February 15, 2005, Sui signed a contract with the WNBA's Sacramento Monarchs and was drafted in April of that year, becoming the second Chinese woman basketball player to join the WNBA. As of 2006, she was playing as guard. Her teammate Miao Lijie also signed with the Monarchs.

She competed at the 2004 Summer Olympics in Athens and the 2008 Summer Olympics in Beijing.

== Career statistics ==
Legend
GP	Games played	GS	Games started	MPG	Minutes per game	RPG	Rebounds per game
APG	Assists per game	SPG	Steals per game	BPG	Blocks per game	PPG	Points per game
TO	Turnovers per game	FG%	Field-goal percentage	3P%	3-point field-goal percentage	FT%	Free-throw percentage
**Bold**	Career best	°	League leader

=== WNBA ===
WNBA regular season statistics
Year	Team	GP	GS	MPG	FG%	3P%	FT%	RPG	APG	SPG	BPG	TO	PPG
2005	Sacramento	5	0	4.8	.167	1.000	1.000	0.2	0.6	0.0	0.0	0.4	1.4
**Career**	1 year, 1 team	5	0	4.8	.167	1.000	1.000	0.2	0.6	0.0	0.0	0.4	1.4
