= Chen Nan =

Chinese basketball player (born 1983)

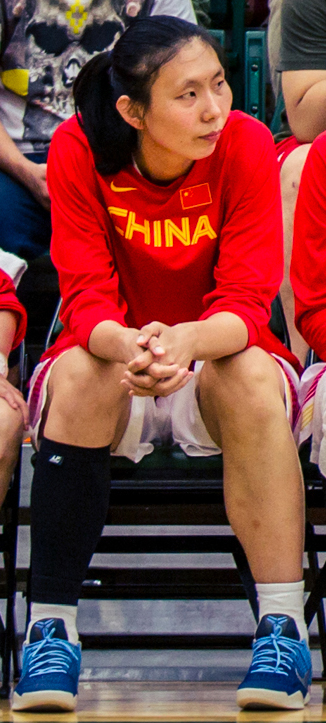
- Chen Nan in 2016

No. 15 – Bayi Kylin
- Position: Center
- League: WCBA

Personal information
- Born: January 8, 1983 (age 43) Qingdao, Shandong, China
- Listed height: 6 ft 5 in (1.96 m)
- Listed weight: 204 lb (93 kg)

Career history
- 2009: Chicago Sky
- Stats at WNBA.com
- Stats at Basketball Reference
Medals
Women's basketball
Representing China
Asian Games
Gold medal – first place	2002 Busan	Team
Gold medal – first place	2006 Doha	Team
Gold medal – first place	2010 Guangzhou	Team

Chen Nan (Chinese: 陈楠; pinyin: Chén Nán; born January 8, 1983) is a Chinese basketball player.

Chen was part of the Chinese teams that won gold medals at the 2002, 2006, and 2010 Asian Games. She competed at the 2004 Summer Olympics in Athens, the 2008 Summer Olympics in Beijing, and the 2012 Summer Olympics in London.

== WNBA career ==
On April 28, 2009, she was signed onto the WNBA team Chicago Sky through the 2010 season.
