= 2017 FIBA Women's Asia Cup squads =

This article shows the rosters of all participating teams at the 2017 FIBA Women's Asia Cup in Bangalore, India.

== Division A ==
=== Group A ===
==== China ====
China women's national basketball team roster
Players
Coaches

| Pos. | No. | Name | Age – Date of birth | Height | Club | Ctr. |
|---|---|---|---|---|---|---|
| PG | 2 | Shen Yi | 24 – 1 March 1993 | 1.74 m (5 ft 9 in) | Guangdong Dolphins | (China) |
| PG | 4 | Shi Xiufeng | 29 – 16 September 1987 | 1.78 m (5 ft 10 in) | Beijing Great Wall | (China) |
| SG | 5 | Chen Xiaojia | 29 – 2 April 1988 | 1.82 m (6 ft 0 in) | Jiangsu Phoenix | (China) |
| G/F | 6 | Li Meng | 22 – 2 January 1995 | 1.85 m (6 ft 1 in) | Shenyang Golden Lions | (China) |
| SG | 7 | Shao Ting | 27 – 10 December 1989 | 1.84 m (6 ft 0 in) | Beijing Great Wall | (China) |
| SF | 9 | Zhao Shuang | 27 – 21 June 1990 | 1.88 m (6 ft 2 in) | Shenyang Golden Lions | (China) |
| SF | 10 | Lu Wen (C) | 27 – 26 February 1990 | 1.88 m (6 ft 2 in) | Bayi Kylins | (China) |
| PF | 11 | Huang Sijing | 21 – 8 January 1996 | 1.92 m (6 ft 4 in) | Guangdong Dolphins | (China) |
| PF | 12 | Gao Song | 25 – 16 April 1992 | 1.90 m (6 ft 3 in) | Beijing Great Wall | (China) |
| C | 13 | Sun Mengran | 25 – 16 July 1992 | 1.97 m (6 ft 6 in) | Bayi Kylins | (China) |
| F/C | 14 | Huang Hongpin | 28 – 23 April 1989 | 1.96 m (6 ft 5 in) | Shanxi Flame | (China) |
| C | 15 | Li Yueru | 18 – 28 March 1999 | 2.01 m (6 ft 7 in) | Guangdong Dolphins | (China) |

Head coach

- (China) Xu Limin

Assistant coach(es)

- (Australia) Michele Timms
- (China) Zheng Wei

Legend

- Club – describes last
  club before the tournament
- Age – describes age
  on 23 July 2017

==== Chinese Taipei ====
Chinese Taipei women's national basketball team roster
Players
Coaches

| Pos. | No. | Name | Age – Date of birth | Height | Club | Ctr. |
|---|---|---|---|---|---|---|
| C | 1 | Lin Chi-wen | 33 – 19 August 1983 | 1.86 m (6 ft 1 in) | Taiwan Power | (Chinese Taipei) |
| C | 2 | Huang Hsiang-ting | 24 – 26 January 1993 | 1.79 m (5 ft 10 in) | Chunghwa Telecom | (Chinese Taipei) |
| F | 3 | Lo Pin | 20 – 2 September 1996 | 1.69 m (5 ft 7 in) | Chinese Culture University | (Chinese Taipei) |
| F | 4 | Chen Yen-yu | 22 – 7 October 1994 | 1.70 m (5 ft 7 in) | Chunghwa Telecom | (Chinese Taipei) |
| G | 5 | Huang Fan-shan | 29 – 29 September 1987 | 1.74 m (5 ft 9 in) | Cathay Life | (Chinese Taipei) |
| F | 7 | Lan Hao-yu | 33 – 2 August 1983 | 1.72 m (5 ft 8 in) | Cathay Life | (Chinese Taipei) |
| F/C | 9 | Huang Ping-jen | 27 – 6 November 1989 | 1.77 m (5 ft 10 in) | Henan Phoenix | (China) |
| C | 11 | Wang Wei-lin | 24 – 1 February 1993 | 1.80 m (5 ft 11 in) | Chunghwa Telecom | (Chinese Taipei) |
| F | 12 | Wu Ying-chieh | 24 – 3 November 1992 | 1.77 m (5 ft 10 in) | Taiyuan Textile | (Chinese Taipei) |
| C | 13 | Cheng I-hsiu | 24 – 24 June 1993 | 1.78 m (5 ft 10 in) | Cathay Life | (Chinese Taipei) |
| C | 17 | Bao Hsi-le | 26 – 7 November 1990 | 1.96 m (6 ft 5 in) | Ballarat Rush | (Australia) |
| F | 27 | Lin Yu-ting | 23 – 25 January 1994 | 1.80 m (5 ft 11 in) | Cathay Life | (Chinese Taipei) |

Head coach

- (Chinese Taipei) Cheng Hui-yun

Assistant coach(es)

- (Chinese Taipei) Chu Yung-hsuan
- (Chinese Taipei) Ko Meng-i

Legend

- Club – describes last
  club before the tournament
- Age – describes age
  on 23 July 2017

==== New Zealand ====
New Zealand women's national basketball team roster
Players
Coaches

| Pos. | No. | Name | Age – Date of birth | Height | Club | Ctr. |
|---|---|---|---|---|---|---|
| PG | 2 | Micaela Cocks | 30 – 19 August 1986 | 1.74 m (5 ft 9 in) | Townsville Fire | (Australia) |
| C | 4 | Kalani Purcell | 22 – 13 January 1995 | 1.88 m (6 ft 2 in) | Melbourne Boomers | (Australia) |
| PG | 5 | Georgia Agnew | 23 – 30 October 1993 | 1.75 m (5 ft 9 in) | Harbour Breeze | (New Zealand) |
| SG | 6 | Zara Jillings | 19 – 30 May 1998 | 1.78 m (5 ft 10 in) | Fordham Rams | (United States) |
| SF | 7 | Antonia Farnworth | 30 – 10 May 1987 | 1.81 m (5 ft 11 in) | Perth Lynx | (Australia) |
| SF | 8 | Natalie Taylor | 34 – 24 December 1982 | 1.82 m (6 ft 0 in) | Brisbane Spartans | (Australia) |
| G/F | 9 | Rebecca Ott | 22 – 9 August 1994 | 1.84 m (6 ft 0 in) | Melbourne Boomers | (Australia) |
| SG | 10 | Chevannah Paalvast | 25 – 4 September 1991 | 1.80 m (5 ft 11 in) | Mackay Meteorettes | (Australia) |
| PF | 11 | Jessica Bygate | 25 – 10 January 1992 | 1.86 m (6 ft 1 in) | Sandringham Sabres | (Australia) |
| PF | 12 | Jillian Harmon | 30 – 3 March 1987 | 1.85 m (6 ft 1 in) | Le Murra Lucca | (Italy) |
| C | 13 | Josephine Stockill | 23 – 29 December 1993 | 1.90 m (6 ft 3 in) | Sunbury Jets | (Australia) |
| F/C | 15 | Deena Franklin | 22 – 5 February 1995 | 1.86 m (6 ft 1 in) | Harbour Breeze | (New Zealand) |

Head coach

- (New Zealand) Kennedy Kereama

Assistant coach(es)

- (Australia) Guy Molloy
- (New Zealand) Aik Ho

Legend

- Club – describes last
  club before the tournament
- Age – describes age
  on 23 July 2017

==== North Korea ====
North Korea women's national basketball team roster
Players
Coaches

| Pos. | No. | Name | Age – Date of birth | Height | Club | Ctr. |
|---|---|---|---|---|---|---|
| G | 3 | Jang Mi-gyong | 24 – 4 November 1992 | 1.67 m (5 ft 6 in) |
| G | 5 | Kim Hye-yon | 19 – 16 February 1998 | 1.72 m (5 ft 8 in) |
| G | 6 | Kim Un-jong | 23 – 12 October 1993 | 1.64 m (5 ft 5 in) |
| G | 8 | Kim Hyang-ok | 28 – 20 January 1989 | 1.68 m (5 ft 6 in) |
| F | 9 | Kim Mi-hyang | 25 – 13 February 1992 | 1.75 m (5 ft 9 in) |
| F | 10 | Ri Jong-ok | 25 – 16 March 1992 | 1.74 m (5 ft 9 in) |
| F | 11 | Pak Hyang-jong | 24 – 12 December 1992 | 1.75 m (5 ft 9 in) |
| C | 12 | Ro Suk-yong | 24 – 28 January 1993 | 1.81 m (5 ft 11 in) |
| F | 14 | Ko Un-gyong | 19 – 14 April 1998 | 1.80 m (5 ft 11 in) |
| F | 15 | Kong Su-yon | 17 – 14 March 2000 | 1.80 m (5 ft 11 in) |
| G | 16 | Kim Ryu-jong | 20 – 2 June 1997 | 1.77 m (5 ft 10 in) |
| C | 17 | Pak Jin-a | 14 – 5 May 2003 | 2.00 m (6 ft 7 in) |

Head coach

- (North Korea) Kim Chol-sun

Assistant coach(es)

- (North Korea) Choe Song-hak

Legend

- Club – describes last
  club before the tournament
- Age – describes age
  on 23 July 2017

=== Group B ===
==== Australia ====
Australia women's national basketball team roster
Players
Coaches

| Pos. | No. | Name | Age – Date of birth | Height | Club | Ctr. |
|---|---|---|---|---|---|---|
| PG | 4 | Tessa Lavey | 24 – 29 March 1993 | 1.71 m (5 ft 7 in) | Dandenong Rangers | (Australia) |
| C | 5 | Alanna Smith | 20 – 10 September 1996 | 1.93 m (6 ft 4 in) | Stanford Cardinal | (United States) |
| PG | 6 | Lauren Mansfield | 27 – 18 December 1989 | 1.70 m (5 ft 7 in) | Canberra Capitals | (Australia) |
| SG | 7 | Madeleine Garrick | 25 – 1 April 1992 | 1.79 m (5 ft 10 in) | Melbourne Boomers | (Australia) |
| SF | 8 | Stephanie Blicavs | 26 – 26 July 1990 | 1.79 m (5 ft 10 in) | Dandenong Rangers | (Australia) |
| PF | 9 | Kelsey Griffin | 30 – 2 July 1987 | 1.88 m (6 ft 2 in) | Bendigo Spirit | (Australia) |
| SG | 10 | Katie-Rae Ebzery | 27 – 8 January 1990 | 1.79 m (5 ft 10 in) | Sydney Uni Flames | (Australia) |
| F/C | 11 | Laura Hodges | 33 – 13 December 1983 | 1.90 m (6 ft 3 in) | Adelaide Lightning | (Australia) |
| G/F | 12 | Belinda Snell | 36 – 10 January 1981 | 1.81 m (5 ft 11 in) | Sydney Uni Flames | (Australia) |
| SF | 13 | Alice Kunek | 26 – 6 January 1991 | 1.87 m (6 ft 2 in) | Perth Lynx | (Australia) |
| C | 14 | Marianna Tolo | 28 – 2 July 1989 | 1.96 m (6 ft 5 in) | Bellona AGÜ | (Turkey) |
| PF | 15 | Sara Blicavs | 24 – 15 February 1993 | 1.89 m (6 ft 2 in) | Dandenong Rangers | (Australia) |

Head coach

- (Australia) Cheryl Chambers

Assistant coach(es)

- (Australia) Paul Goriss
- (Germany) Olaf Lange

Legend

- Club – describes last
  club before the tournament
- Age – describes age
  on 23 July 2017

==== Japan ====
Japan women's national basketball team roster
Players
Coaches

| Pos. | No. | Name | Age – Date of birth | Height | Club | Ctr. |
|---|---|---|---|---|---|---|
| SF | 0 | Moeko Nagaoka | 23 – 29 December 1993 | 1.82 m (6 ft 0 in) | Toyota Antelopes | (Japan) |
| PG | 1 | Manami Fujioka | 23 – 1 February 1994 | 1.70 m (5 ft 7 in) | JX Eneos Sunflowers | (Japan) |
| C | 6 | Yuka Osaki | 27 – 3 April 1990 | 1.85 m (6 ft 1 in) | JX Eneos Sunflowers | (Japan) |
| SG | 7 | Saki Mizushima | 26 – 24 April 1991 | 1.72 m (5 ft 8 in) | Toyota Antelopes | (Japan) |
| PF | 8 | Maki Takada | 27 – 23 August 1989 | 1.83 m (6 ft 0 in) | Denso Iris | (Japan) |
| PG | 12 | Asami Yoshida | 29 – 9 October 1987 | 1.65 m (5 ft 5 in) | JX Eneos Sunflowers | (Japan) |
| PG | 13 | Rui Machida | 24 – 8 March 1993 | 1.62 m (5 ft 4 in) | Fujitsu Red Wave | (Japan) |
| SG | 20 | Kaede Kondo | 25 – 6 October 1991 | 1.73 m (5 ft 8 in) | Toyota Antelopes | (Japan) |
| PF | 22 | Miyuki Kawamura | 22 – 27 October 1994 | 1.85 m (6 ft 1 in) | Chanson V-Magic | (Japan) |
| SF | 30 | Evelyn Mawuli | 22 – 2 June 1995 | 1.80 m (5 ft 11 in) | Toyota Antelopes | (Japan) |
| SF | 39 | Sakura Akaho | 21 – 30 April 1996 | 1.84 m (6 ft 0 in) | Denso Iris | (Japan) |
| SF | 52 | Yuki Miyazawa | 24 – 2 June 1993 | 1.82 m (6 ft 0 in) | JX Eneos Sunflowers | (Japan) |

Head coach

- (United States) Tom Hovasse

Assistant coach(es)

- (Japan) Toru Onzuka

Legend

- Club – describes last
  club before the tournament
- Age – describes age
  on 23 July 2017

==== Philippines ====
Philippines women's national basketball team roster
Players
Coaches

| Pos. | No. | Name | Age – Date of birth | Height | Club | Ctr. |
|---|---|---|---|---|---|---|
| F | 3 | Afril Bernardino | 21 – 3 April 1996 | 1.72 m (5 ft 8 in) | National University | (Philippines) |
| G | 6 | France Mae Cabinbin | 25 – 6 December 1991 | 1.52 m (5 ft 0 in) | Lyceum University | (Philippines) |
| F | 8 | Camille Sambile | 25 – 24 April 1992 | 1.80 m (5 ft 11 in) | Far Eastern University | (Philippines) |
| F | 9 | Allana Lim | 28 – 12 September 1988 | 1.75 m (5 ft 9 in) | Far Eastern University | (Philippines) |
| C | 10 | Jack Danielle Animam | 18 – 27 November 1998 | 1.90 m (6 ft 3 in) | National University | (Philippines) |
| F | 12 | Cindy Resultay | 26 – 31 December 1990 | 1.75 m (5 ft 9 in) | Air Force | (Philippines) |
| C | 14 | Analyn Almazan | 28 – 7 October 1988 | 1.80 m (5 ft 11 in) | Adamson University | (Philippines) |
| G | 15 | Raiza Rose Dy | 26 – 21 November 1990 | 1.67 m (5 ft 6 in) | Far Eastern University | (Philippines) |
| C | 17 | Clare Castro | 20 – 13 January 1997 | 1.93 m (6 ft 4 in) | Far Eastern University | (Philippines) |
| G | 18 | Marizze Andrea Tongco | 21 – 18 October 1995 | 1.52 m (5 ft 0 in) | National University | (Philippines) |
| G | 22 | Janine Pontejos | 24 – 29 October 1992 | 1.65 m (5 ft 5 in) | University of the East | (Philippines) |
| F | 28 | Gemma Miranda | 22 – 28 February 1995 | 1.73 m (5 ft 8 in) | National University | (Philippines) |

Head coach

- (Philippines) Patrick Aquino

Assistant coach(es)

- (Philippines) Julie Amos

Legend

- Club – describes last
  club before the tournament
- Age – describes age
  on 23 July 2017

==== South Korea ====
South Korea women's national basketball team roster
Players
Coaches

| Pos. | No. | Name | Age – Date of birth | Height | Club | Ctr. |
|---|---|---|---|---|---|---|
| G | 1 | Park Hana | 26 – 14 September 1990 | 1.76 m (5 ft 9 in) | Asan Woori Bank Wibee | (South Korea) |
| F | 3 | Kang Lee-seul | 23 – 5 April 1994 | 1.80 m (5 ft 11 in) | Bucheon KEB Hana Bank | (South Korea) |
| G | 4 | Sim Sung-young | 24 – 14 October 1992 | 1.65 m (5 ft 5 in) | Cheongju KB Stars | (South Korea) |
| G | 5 | Park Hye-jin | 27 – 22 July 1990 | 1.78 m (5 ft 10 in) | Asan Woori Bank Wibee | (South Korea) |
| C | 6 | Kim So-dam | 24 – 4 January 1993 | 1.85 m (6 ft 1 in) | Guri KDB Life Winnus | (South Korea) |
| F | 7 | Kang Ajeong | 27 – 25 July 1989 | 1.80 m (5 ft 11 in) | Cheongju KB Stars | (South Korea) |
| G | 8 | Kim Han-byul | 30 – 21 November 1986 | 1.78 m (5 ft 10 in) | Yongin Samsung Blueminx | (South Korea) |
| C | 9 | Kwak Joo-yeong | 32 – 21 August 1984 | 1.85 m (6 ft 1 in) | Incheon Shinhan Bank S-Birds | (South Korea) |
| C | 10 | Bae Hye-yoon | 28 – 10 June 1989 | 1.83 m (6 ft 0 in) | Yongin Samsung Blueminx | (South Korea) |
| G | 11 | Lim Yung-hui | 37 – 29 May 1980 | 1.78 m (5 ft 10 in) | Asan Woori Bank Wibee | (South Korea) |
| F | 13 | Kim Dan-bi | 27 – 27 February 1990 | 1.80 m (5 ft 11 in) | Incheon Shinhan Bank S-Birds | (South Korea) |
| C | 19 | Park Ji-su | 18 – 6 December 1998 | 1.95 m (6 ft 5 in) | Cheongju KB Stars | (South Korea) |

Head coach

- (South Korea) Seo Dong-chul

Assistant coach(es)

- (South Korea) Chun Joo-weon

Legend

- Club – describes last
  club before the tournament
- Age – describes age
  on 23 July 2017

== Division B ==
=== Group A ===
==== India ====
India women's national basketball team roster
Players
Coaches

| Pos. | No. | Name | Age – Date of birth | Height | Club | Ctr. |
|---|---|---|---|---|---|---|
| F | 4 | Anjana Prasannan Geetha | 22 – 9 November 1994 | 1.77 m (5 ft 10 in) | Kerala | (India) |
| PG | 5 | Barkha Sonkar | 20 – 24 December 1996 | 1.58 m (5 ft 2 in) | Hillsborough Hawks | (United States) |
| F | 6 | Raspreet Sidhu | 28 – 18 July 1989 | 1.70 m (5 ft 7 in) | Delhi | (India) |
| G | 7 | Anitha Paul Durai | 32 – 22 June 1985 | 1.69 m (5 ft 7 in) | Railways | (India) |
| F | 10 | Navaneetha Pattemane Udayakumar | 22 – 28 July 1994 | 1.78 m (5 ft 10 in) | Railways | (India) |
| PG | 11 | Kavita Akula | 21 – 10 January 1996 | 1.60 m (5 ft 3 in) | Grand Canyon Antelopes | (United States) |
| C | 12 | Rajapriyadharshini Rajaganapathi | 23 – 3 January 1994 | 1.89 m (6 ft 2 in) | Railways | (India) |
| F | 13 | Jeena Palanilkumkalayil Skaria | 23 – 9 January 1994 | 1.79 m (5 ft 10 in) | Kerala | (India) |
| F | 14 | Shireen Vijay Limaye | 22 – 13 February 1995 | 1.79 m (5 ft 10 in) | Pune | (India) |
| C | 15 | Poonam Chaturvedi | 22 – 1 July 1995 | 2.11 m (6 ft 11 in) |
| F | 17 | Grima Merlin Varghese | 22 – 29 March 1995 | 1.74 m (5 ft 9 in) | Kerala | (India) |
| C | 21 | Anmolpreet Kaur | 17 – 24 November 1999 | 1.85 m (6 ft 1 in) | Tokyo Gakuen | (Japan) |

Head coach

- (Serbia) Zoran Višić

Assistant coach(es)

- (India) Shiba Maggon

Legend

- Club – describes last
  club before the tournament
- Age – describes age
  on 23 July 2017

==== Sri Lanka ====
Sri Lanka women's national basketball team roster
Players
Coaches

| Pos. | No. | Name | Age – Date of birth | Height | Club | Ctr. |
|---|---|---|---|---|---|---|
| PG | 4 | Premila Beruwalage | 36 – 22 March 1981 | 1.61 m (5 ft 3 in) |
| PF | 6 | Josephine Niroshini Paiva | 27 – 26 November 1989 | 1.80 m (5 ft 11 in) |
| F | 7 | Anjalee Ekanayake | 28 – 14 February 1989 | 1.64 m (5 ft 5 in) |
| PG | 8 | Imesha Thathsarani Dapana Durage | 21 – 17 March 1996 | 1.72 m (5 ft 8 in) |
| C | 9 | Sanduni Bollegala Arachchilage | 33 – 4 December 1983 | 1.73 m (5 ft 8 in) |
| F | 10 | Jayani Nugi Ransari Thewahettige | 24 – 14 April 1993 | 1.64 m (5 ft 5 in) |
| PG | 11 | Sulochana Sewwandi Iddamalgoda | 28 – 22 March 1989 | 1.52 m (5 ft 0 in) |
| F | 12 | Benika Don Thalagala | 29 – 7 August 1987 | 1.74 m (5 ft 9 in) |
| PG | 13 | Jayaliya Thewahettige | 34 – 1 February 1983 | 1.61 m (5 ft 3 in) |
| C | 14 | Kumarine Silva | 36 – 15 May 1981 | 1.78 m (5 ft 10 in) |
| PF | 15 | Thusyanthini Jeevathasan Karthigesu | 25 – 8 January 1992 | 1.75 m (5 ft 9 in) |
| C | 19 | Erandi Gallage | 31 – 14 May 1986 | 1.73 m (5 ft 8 in) |

Head coach

- (Sri Lanka) Tuan Murad Amath

Assistant coach(es)

- (Sri Lanka) Susil Shantha Udukumburage

Legend

- Club – describes last
  club before the tournament
- Age – describes age
  on 23 July 2017

==== Uzbekistan ====
Uzbekistan women's national basketball team roster
Players
Coaches

| Pos. | No. | Name | Age – Date of birth | Height | Club | Ctr. |
|---|---|---|---|---|---|---|
| G | 4 | Yuliya Kashuba | 29 – 2 December 1987 | 1.70 m (5 ft 7 in) |
| G | 5 | Anastasiya Sevastyanova | 30 – 19 February 1987 | 1.68 m (5 ft 6 in) |
| F | 6 | Gulnaz Nauruzbaeva | 27 – 9 November 1989 | 1.74 m (5 ft 9 in) |
| F | 7 | Elena Khusnitdinova | 32 – 3 May 1985 | 1.77 m (5 ft 10 in) |
| G | 8 | Tatyana Komarova | 20 – 27 December 1996 | 1.67 m (5 ft 6 in) |
| F | 9 | Khristina Avdeeva | 26 – 9 December 1990 | 1.75 m (5 ft 9 in) |
| G | 10 | Natalya Koneva | 28 – 2 June 1989 | 1.72 m (5 ft 8 in) |
| F | 11 | Elvira Salavatova | 17 – 17 September 1999 | 1.83 m (6 ft 0 in) |
| F | 12 | Irina Averyanova | 33 – 14 March 1984 | 1.88 m (6 ft 2 in) |
| C | 13 | Dlyara Asanova | 20 – 19 October 1996 | 1.91 m (6 ft 3 in) |
| F | 14 | Katerina Ejova | 17 – 17 October 1999 | 1.78 m (5 ft 10 in) |
| C | 15 | Aliya Samatova | 23 – 10 May 1994 | 1.94 m (6 ft 4 in) |

Head coach

- (Uzbekistan) Stepan Lebedev

Assistant coach(es)

- (Uzbekistan) Jakhongir Khodjaev

Legend

- Club – describes last
  club before the tournament
- Age – describes age
  on 23 July 2017

=== Group B ===
==== Fiji ====
Fiji women's national basketball team roster
Players
Coaches

| Pos. | No. | Name | Age – Date of birth | Height | Club | Ctr. |
|---|---|---|---|---|---|---|
| SG | 4 | Talica Vula Sauta | 27 – 23 December 1989 | 1.58 m (5 ft 2 in) |
| SG | 5 | Seini Macrae Dobui | 34 – 8 July 1983 | 1.58 m (5 ft 2 in) |
| PG | 6 | Tiyana Anne Kainamoli | 19 – 27 June 1998 | 1.59 m (5 ft 3 in) |
| SG | 7 | Kelera Koyamainavure | 21 – 22 June 1996 | 1.76 m (5 ft 9 in) |
| PF | 8 | Amalaini Raluvenitoga | 25 – 13 October 1991 | 1.80 m (5 ft 11 in) |
| SG | 9 | Mereleni Dreke Tora | 34 – 9 May 1983 | 1.79 m (5 ft 10 in) |
| C | 10 | Disiola Kaseva Boseiwaqa | 22 – 9 March 1995 | 1.87 m (6 ft 2 in) |
| SG | 11 | Bitila Sigani Tawake | 18 – 2 April 1999 | 1.57 m (5 ft 2 in) |
| SF | 12 | Dale Wise | 36 – 4 July 1981 | 1.83 m (6 ft 0 in) |
| G | 13 | Valerie Nainima | 31 – 29 June 1986 | 1.65 m (5 ft 5 in) |
| C | 14 | Leba Korovou | 21 – 8 November 1995 | 1.87 m (6 ft 2 in) |
| F | 15 | Letava Whippy | 26 – 24 March 1991 | 1.80 m (5 ft 11 in) |

Head coach

- (Fiji) Laisiasa Puamau

Legend

- Club – describes last
  club before the tournament
- Age – describes age
  on 23 July 2017

==== Kazakhstan ====
Kazakhstan women's national basketball team roster
Players
Coaches

| Pos. | No. | Name | Age – Date of birth | Height | Club | Ctr. |
|---|---|---|---|---|---|---|
| PG | 2 | Elmira Abikeyeva | 20 – 11 April 1997 | 1.68 m (5 ft 6 in) | Iritish Pavladar | (Kazakhstan) |
| PF | 3 | Zalina Kurazova | 32 – 28 January 1985 | 1.84 m (6 ft 0 in) | Astana Tigers | (Kazakhstan) |
| PG | 4 | Aigerim Aldanysheva | 23 – 30 November 1993 | 1.65 m (5 ft 5 in) | Okzhetpes Kokshetau | (Kazakhstan) |
| SG | 6 | Alexandra Kovalevskaya | 20 – 8 April 1997 | 1.72 m (5 ft 8 in) | Astana Tigers | (Kazakhstan) |
| SG | 7 | Tamara Yagodkina | 27 – 10 January 1990 | 1.70 m (5 ft 7 in) | Astana Tigers | (Kazakhstan) |
| SG | 8 | Mariya Astapenko | 28 – 28 May 1989 | 1.77 m (5 ft 10 in) | Astana Tigers | (Kazakhstan) |
| SG | 10 | Olga Kolesnikova | 25 – 2 February 1992 | 1.70 m (5 ft 7 in) | Okzhetpes Kokshetau | (Kazakhstan) |
| SF | 11 | Oxana Ivanova | 27 – 19 April 1990 | 1.86 m (6 ft 1 in) | Astana Tigers | (Kazakhstan) |
| SF | 12 | Anastassiya Begun | 21 – 22 December 1995 | 1.81 m (5 ft 11 in) | Astana Tigers | (Kazakhstan) |
| C | 13 | Anna Vinokurova | 24 – 18 December 1992 | 1.90 m (6 ft 3 in) | Astana Tigers | (Kazakhstan) |
| SF | 14 | Oxana Ossipenko | 32 – 4 January 1985 | 1.86 m (6 ft 1 in) | Astana Tigers | (Kazakhstan) |
| C | 15 | Nadezha Kondrakova | 28 – 8 April 1989 | 1.92 m (6 ft 4 in) | Astana Tigers | (Kazakhstan) |

Head coach

- (Kazakhstan) Evgeniy Ovsyannikov

Legend

- Club – describes last
  club before the tournament
- Age – describes age
  on 23 July 2017

==== Lebanon ====
Lebanon roster for the 2017 FIBA Women's Asia Cup.

Lebanon women's national basketball team roster
Players
Coaches

| Pos. | No. | Name | Age – Date of birth | Height | Club | Ctr. |
|---|---|---|---|---|---|---|
| PG | 3 | Farah El Harake | 27 – 10 July 1990 | 1.68 m (5 ft 6 in) | Homenetmen Antelias | (Lebanon) |
| G | 5 | Lama Moukaddem | 26 – 5 December 1990 | 1.74 m (5 ft 9 in) | Sporting Al Riyadi Beirut | (Lebanon) |
| PF | 6 | Chirine El Charif | 32 – 6 October 1984 | 1.80 m (5 ft 11 in) | Sporting Al Riyadi Beirut | (Lebanon) |
| PF | 8 | Narine Gyokchian | 24 – 22 July 1993 | 1.87 m (6 ft 2 in) |
| G | 9 | Layla Fares | 28 – 12 March 1989 | 1.75 m (5 ft 9 in) | Homenetmen Antelias | (Lebanon) |
| G | 11 | Rebecca Akl | 24 – 18 October 1992 | 1.70 m (5 ft 7 in) | Homenetmen Antelias | (Lebanon) |
| G | 12 | Karen Chammas | 24 – 29 June 1993 | 1.69 m (5 ft 7 in) | Antranik SC | (Lebanon) |
| G | 13 | Miramar Mokdad | 29 – 24 December 1987 | 1.69 m (5 ft 7 in) |
| PF | 21 | Nancy Maalouf | 28 – 19 November 1988 | 1.74 m (5 ft 9 in) | Antranik SC | (Lebanon) |
| G | 23 | Nour Schoucair | 31 – 10 December 1985 | 1.69 m (5 ft 7 in) | Antranik SC | (Lebanon) |
| G | 33 | Aida Bakhos | 31 – 21 March 1986 | 1.77 m (5 ft 10 in) | Homenetmen Antelias | (Lebanon) |

Head coach

- (Lebanon) Tigran Gyokchyan

Assistant coach(es)

- (Lebanon) Marwan Diab
- (Lebanon) Nelly Nassar

Legend

- Club – describes last
  club before the tournament
- Age – describes age
  on 23 July 2017

==== Singapore ====
Singapore women's national basketball team roster
Players
Coaches

| Pos. | No. | Name | Age – Date of birth | Height | Club | Ctr. |
|---|---|---|---|---|---|---|
| G | 1 | Jacqueline Jia Jia Chu | 26 – 8 February 1991 | 1.63 m (5 ft 4 in) | Adroit | (Singapore) |
| C | 5 | Siew Ting Pauline Ang | 23 – 6 January 1994 | 1.78 m (5 ft 10 in) | Qian Xi | (Singapore) |
| G | 6 | Jia Min Lim | 25 – 8 August 1991 | 1.65 m (5 ft 5 in) | Qian Xi | (Singapore) |
| G | 7 | Kai Ting Shermaine Lee | 23 – 27 April 1994 | 1.62 m (5 ft 4 in) | Hillcrest Grays | (Singapore) |
| F | 8 | Jayne Sarah En Min Tan | 27 – 28 August 1989 | 1.70 m (5 ft 7 in) | Qian Xi | (Singapore) |
| G | 9 | Zhi Yan Amanda Lim | 21 – 27 June 1996 | 1.64 m (5 ft 5 in) | Siglap | (Singapore) |
| G | 11 | Wei Bin Koh | 31 – 12 January 1986 | 1.65 m (5 ft 5 in) | Qian Xi | (Singapore) |
| G | 12 | Choy Ting Tang | 24 – 18 July 1993 | 1.73 m (5 ft 8 in) | Qian Xi | (Singapore) |
| F | 15 | Cheryl Poon | 29 – 20 August 1987 | 1.62 m (5 ft 4 in) | Hillcrest Grays | (Singapore) |
| C | 19 | Rui Jia Alanna Lim | 22 – 10 November 1994 | 1.72 m (5 ft 8 in) | Qian Xi | (Singapore) |
| F | 21 | Yukie Yoshida | 27 – 4 June 1990 | 1.75 m (5 ft 9 in) | Hillcrest Grays | (Singapore) |
| G | 22 | Ariel Xiang Ying Loiter | 15 – 19 March 2002 | 1.65 m (5 ft 5 in) |

Head coach

- (United States) Kirk Murad

Assistant coach(es)

- (Singapore) Ho Yoke Mei

Legend

- Club – describes last
  club before the tournament
- Age – describes age
  on 23 July 2017
