= 2017 FIBA Women's Asia Cup =

Qualifying tournament for FIBA Asia and FIBA Oceania

27th Asian Women's Basketball Championship

Tournament details
- Host country: India
- Dates: 23–29 July
- Teams: 16 (from 46 federations)
- Venue: 1 (in 1 host city)

Final positions
- Champions: Japan (4th title)

Tournament statistics
- MVP: (Australia) Kelsey Griffin
- Top scorer: (North Korea) Ro (20.2)
- Top rebounds: (New Zealand) Purcell (10.0)
- Top assists: (Japan) Fujioka (9.2)
- PPG (Team): China (92.0)
- RPG (Team): China (47.0)
- APG (Team): China (29.8)

Official website
- 2017 FIBA Women's Asia Cup

The 2017 FIBA Women's Asia Cup was the qualifying tournament for FIBA Asia and FIBA Oceania at the 2018 FIBA Women's Basketball World Cup in Spain. The tournament was held from 23 to 29 July in Bangalore, India. Before this edition, the tournament was known as the FIBA Asia Championship for Women, and only involved FIBA Asia members. FIBA Oceania teams Australia and New Zealand, as well as Fiji (at Division B) competed in the tournament for the first time.

Japan won their fourth title after defeating Australia 74–73 in the final, while China captured the bronze medal by defeating South Korea 75–51. These four countries qualified for 2018 FIBA Women's Basketball World Cup.

== Venue ==
Bangalore	2017 FIBA Women's Asia Cup is located in India
Sree Kanteerava Indoor Stadium	2017 FIBA Women's Asia Cup is located in India
Capacity: 4,000	2017 FIBA Women's Asia Cup is located in India

== Qualifiers ==
For Division A:

- Semifinalists at the 2015 FIBA Asia Women's Championship:
  - Japan
  - China
  - South Korea
  - Chinese Taipei
- Qualifying round winners at the 2015 FIBA Asia Women's Championship:
  - Philippines
  - North Korea
- Teams from FIBA Oceania:
  - Australia
  - New Zealand

For Division B:

- The host nation, being relegated to Division B at the previous championship:
  - India
- Early registrants for the Division B slots from FIBA Asia:
  - Kazakhstan
  - Sri Lanka
  - Lebanon
  - Uzbekistan
  - Singapore
- Finalists of the Women's Basketball Final at the 2015 Pacific Games:
  - Fiji
  - American Samoa (withdrew) (Note: American Samoa originally qualified for 2017 FIBA Asia Women's Cup and was drawn into Group A of Division B but withdrew in July 2017 prior to the tournament citing the failure to secure funding from the American Samoa National Olympic Committee and their government.)

== Competition format ==
The tournament composed of two divisions, Division A and Division B.

For each division, during the Group Phase, eight participating teams were divided into two groups (A and B) of four teams each. Each team played all the other teams in its own group (a total of three games for each team), and all four teams in each group advanced to their division's Quarter-finals. A total of twelve games were played in the Group Phase.

During the Final Phase, Quarter-finals games were decided on the ranking of the participating teams in the Group Phase:

- Game 13: 1st A v 4th B
- Game 14: 2nd B v 3rd B
- Game 15: 3rd A v 2nd B
- Game 16: 4th A v 1st B

For Division A, the four winners advanced to the Semi-finals and to the 2018 FIBA Women's Basketball World Cup.

Meanwhile, the four losing quarterfinalists went on to play 5th-8th Classification Games wherein the two winners advanced to play 5-6 Classification Game, while the two losers played 7-8 Classification Game

During the Semi-finals, the four teams played as follows:

- Game 21: Winner of Game 13 v Winner of Game 14
- Game 22: Winner of Game 15 v Winner of Game 16

In determining the Champions and the Third Place winner, the four teams played as follows:

- Game 23: Loser of Game 21 v Loser of Game 22
- Game 24: Winner of Game 21 v Winner of Game 22

== Divisions ==
Division A included teams that won in the 2015 qualifying round and the semifinalists of the previous championship. FIBA Oceania teams Australia and New Zealand competed in the tournament for the first time and were placed in the same division.

Division B included the host team, previous championship Level II participants Kazakhstan and Sri Lanka. Returning participants that were absent two years ago were Lebanon, Uzbekistan and Singapore. Completing the eight-team Division B were FIBA Oceania representatives Fiji and American Samoa, which qualified by playing at the Women's Basketball Final at the 2015 Pacific Games.

Included were the FIBA World Rankings prior to the draw.

Division A	Division B
Australia (4); China (10); Japan (13); South Korea (15); Chinese Taipei (34); New Zealand (38); Philippines (49); North Korea (64)	India (40); Kazakhstan (43); Lebanon (54); Uzbekistan (54); Sri Lanka (56); Singapore (67); Fiji (77); American Samoa* (77)

* Withdrew.

== Draw ==
The official draw ceremony was held on 17 May 2017 in Krishna Hall, Bengaluru.

== Division A ==
All times are local (UTC+05:30)

=== Preliminary round ===
==== Group A ====
Pos	Team	Pld	W	L	PF	PA	PD	Pts
1	China	3	3	0	289	164	+125	6
2	New Zealand	3	2	1	178	180	−2	5
3	Chinese Taipei	3	1	2	193	237	−44	4
4	North Korea	3	0	3	179	258	−79	3

Source: FIBA
Rules for classification: 1) Points; 2) Head-to-head results; 3) Points difference; 4) Points scored.

23 July 2017
15:30

Boxscore

Chinese Taipei	77–76	North Korea
Scoring by quarter: 20–28, 20–16, 20–16, 17–16
Pts: Bao 17; Rebs: Bao 10; Asts: Huang P. 4		Pts: Ro 26; Rebs: Kim R. 6 Asts: Jang 5

Kanteerava Indoor Stadium, Bangalore
Referees: Christopher Reid (AUS), Nicolas Fernandes (TAH), Gayan Kahingala (SRI)

23 July 2017
17:45

Boxscore

New Zealand	48–77	China
Scoring by quarter: 10–17, 14–22, 16–21, 8–17
Pts: Harmon 14; Rebs: Purcell 6 Asts: Paalvast 3		Pts: Li M. 15; Rebs: Li Y. 11; Asts: four players 3

Kanteerava Indoor Stadium, Bangalore
Referees: Rajnarayan Patro (IND), Lee Kyoung-hwan (KOR), Kihamu Matsumoto (JPN)

24 July 2017
11:00

Boxscore

North Korea	50–71	New Zealand
Scoring by quarter: 11–17, 14–15, 13–16, 12–23
Pts: Pak H. 20; Rebs: Jang, Ro 7 Asts: Jang 4		Pts: Harmon 23; Rebs: Harmon 13; Asts: Paalvast 5

Kanteerava Indoor Stadium, Bangalore
Referees: Glenn Cornelio (PHI), Imran Baig (IND), Lim Sok Hoon (MAS)

24 July 2017
17:45

Boxscore

China	102–63	Chinese Taipei
Scoring by quarter: 28–8, 30–17, 21–22, 23–16
Pts: Huang S. 25; Rebs: four players 4 Asts: Li M. 7		Pts: Huang P. 13; Rebs: Bao, Lin Y. 4 Asts: three players 2

Kanteerava Indoor Stadium, Bangalore
Referees: Snehal Bendke (IND), James Boyer (AUS), Nicolas Fernandes (TAH)

25 July 2017
11:00

Boxscore

New Zealand	59–53	Chinese Taipei
Scoring by quarter: 7–21, 17–14, 10–3, 25–15
Pts: Purcell 22; Rebs: Harmon 15; Asts: Purcell, Taylor 4		Pts: Bao 12; Rebs: Bao 6 Asts: Huang F. 6

Kanteerava Indoor Stadium, Bangalore
Referees: Rabah Noujaim (LBN), Imran Ali Baig (IND), Joenard Garcia (PHI)

25 July 2017
17:45

Boxscore

North Korea	53–110	China
Scoring by quarter: 7–23, 20–30, 11–28, 15–29
Pts: Ro 20; Rebs: Ro 5 Asts: Ro 4		Pts: Li Y. 33; Rebs: Li Y. 11; Asts: Li M. 8

Kanteerava Indoor Stadium, Bangalore
Referees: Dallas Pickering (NZL), Lim Sok Hoon (MAS), Kihamu Matsumoto (JPN)

==== Group B ====
Pos	Team	Pld	W	L	PF	PA	PD	Pts
1	Australia	3	3	0	268	193	+75	6
2	Japan	3	2	1	250	194	+56	5
3	South Korea	3	1	2	201	211	−10	4
4	Philippines	3	0	3	183	304	−121	3

Source: FIBA
Rules for classification: 1) Points; 2) Head-to-head results; 3) Points difference; 4) Points scored.

23 July 2017
11:00

Boxscore

South Korea	54–78	Australia
Scoring by quarter: 15–13, 3–20, 18–24, 18–21
Pts: Sim 11; Rebs: Park Ji-s. 8 Asts: five players 1		Pts: Griffin 15; Rebs: Smith, Snell 7 Asts: Mansfield 5

Kanteerava Indoor Stadium, Bangalore
Referees: Rabah Noujaim (LBN), Snehal Bendke (IND), Preeda Muongmee (THA)

23 July 2017
13:15

Boxscore

Philippines	55–106	Japan
Scoring by quarter: 11–25, 20–31, 8–31, 16–19
Pts: Miranda 17; Rebs: Animam 9 Asts: Cabinbin 3		Pts: Mawuli 21; Rebs: Akaho, Fujioka 10; Asts: Fujioka 10

Kanteerava Indoor Stadium, Bangalore
Referees: Yevgeniy Mikheyev (KAZ), Imran Baig (IND), Lim Sok Hoon (MAS)

24 July 2017
13:15

Boxscore

Australia	107–65	Philippines
Scoring by quarter: 38–14, 30–9, 21–23, 18–19
Pts: St. Blicavs 18; Rebs: Sa. Blicavs 8 Asts: Sa. Blicavs 6		Pts: Pontejos 18; Rebs: Cabinbin 4 Asts: Cabinbin 5

Kanteerava Indoor Stadium, Bangalore
Referees: Rajnarayan Patro (IND), Gayan Kahingala (SRI), Tien Hsiao-lun (TPE)

24 July 2017
15:30

Boxscore

Japan	70–56	South Korea
Scoring by quarter: 12–14, 26–7, 16–13, 16–22
Pts: Nagaoka 13; Rebs: Mamiya, Miyazawa 5 Asts: Yoshida 8		Pts: Lim 12; Rebs: Kim D. 7 Asts: Kim D. 5

Kanteerava Indoor Stadium, Bangalore
Referees: Rabah Noujaim (LBN), Yevgeniy Mikheyev (KAZ), Preeda Muongmee (THA)

25 July 2017
13:15

Boxscore

Japan	74–83	Australia
Scoring by quarter: 15–14, 15–20, 20–25, 24–24
Pts: Fujioka 18; Rebs: Takada 6 Asts: Fujioka 10		Pts: Tolo 17; Rebs: Griffin 9 Asts: Mansfield 7

Kanteerava Indoor Stadium, Bangalore
Referees: Yevgeniy Mikheyev (KAZ), Nicolas Fernandes (TAH), Preeda Muongmee (THA)

25 July 2017
15:30

Boxscore

South Korea	91–63	Philippines
Scoring by quarter: 19–19, 25–15, 26–13, 21–16
Pts: Kim D. 19; Rebs: Kim D., Lim 10; Asts: Park H.N. 7		Pts: Lim 14; Rebs: Lim 6 Asts: Sambile 4

Kanteerava Indoor Stadium, Bangalore
Referees: Yu Jung (TPE), Matthew Bathurst (NZL), Snehal Bendke (IND)

=== Knockout round ===
==== Bracket ====
Quarterfinals
27 July
China	117
Philippines	43
27 July
Japan	73
Chinese Taipei	57
27 July
New Zealand	49
South Korea	64
27 July
Australia	81
North Korea	48

Semifinals
28 July
China	71
Japan	74
28 July
South Korea	64
Australia	81

Final
29 July
Japan	74
Australia	73
Third place
29 July
China	75
South Korea	51

5th place bracket

5–8th place semifinals
28 July
Philippines	53
Chinese Taipei	87
28 July
New Zealand	82
North Korea	61

Fifth place
29 July
Chinese Taipei	65
New Zealand	45
Seventh place
29 July
Philippines	78
North Korea	63

==== Quarterfinals ====
27 July 2017
11:00

Boxscore

New Zealand	49–64	South Korea
Scoring by quarter: 14–8, 6–26, 18–11, 11–19
Pts: Harmon 13; Rebs: Harmon 10; Asts: four players 2		Pts: Park Ji-s. 19; Rebs: Park Ji-s. 11; Asts: Kim D. 5

Kanteerava Indoor Stadium, Bangalore
Referees: Yevgeniy Mikheyev (KAZ), Snehal Bendke (IND), Preeda Muongmee (THA)

27 July 2017
13:15

Boxscore

Australia	81–48	North Korea
Scoring by quarter: 28–12, 21–11, 11–12, 21–13
Pts: Smith 20; Rebs: Smith 9 Asts: three players 4		Pts: Ro 22; Rebs: Kim R., Ro 5 Asts: Kim R. 4

Kanteerava Indoor Stadium, Bangalore
Referees: Lim Sok Hoon (MAS), Imran Baig (IND), Gayan Kahingala (SRI)

27 July 2017
15:30

Boxscore

China	117–43	Philippines
Scoring by quarter: 33–13, 28–2, 25–16, 31–12
Pts: Li Y. 17; Rebs: Li Y. 12; Asts: Shao, Zhao 7		Pts: Bernardino 11; Rebs: Animam 6 Asts: five players 1

Kanteerava Indoor Stadium, Bangalore
Referees: Rajnarayan Patro (IND), Christopher Reid (AUS), Tien Hsiao-lun (TPE)

27 July 2017
17:45

Boxscore

Japan	73–57	Chinese Taipei
Scoring by quarter: 13–15, 20–15, 19–15, 21–12
Pts: Nagaoka 28; Rebs: Takada 9 Asts: Yoshida 8		Pts: Huang P. 17; Rebs: Bao 16; Asts: Huang F. 5

Kanteerava Indoor Stadium, Bangalore
Referees: Rabah Noujaim (LIB), James Boyer (AUS), Glenn Cornelio (PHI)

==== 5–8th place semifinals ====
28 July 2017
11:00

Boxscore

New Zealand	82–61	North Korea
Scoring by quarter: 31–8, 18–17, 22–16, 22–20
Pts: Harmon 15; Rebs: Purcell 14; Asts: Cocks, Taylor 5		Pts: Ri 19; Rebs: Ro 7 Asts: Ro 5

Kanteerava Indoor Stadium, Bangalore
Referees: Rajnarayan Patro (IND), Joenard Garcia (PHI), Gayan Kahingala (SRI)

28 July 2017
13:15

Boxscore

Philippines	53–87	Chinese Taipei
Scoring by quarter: 17–25, 8–13, 17–21, 11–28
Pts: Cabinbin 14; Rebs: Almazan 6 Asts: Cabinbin 7		Pts: Bao 16; Rebs: Bao 11; Asts: Lin Y. 6

Kanteerava Indoor Stadium, Bangalore
Referees: Dallas Pickering (NZL), Imran Baig (IND), Christopher Reid (AUS)

==== Semifinals ====
28 July 2017
15:30

Boxscore

South Korea	64–81	Australia
Scoring by quarter: 17–22, 13–23, 11–16, 23–20
Pts: Kang L., Sim 14; Rebs: three players 5 Asts: Sim 5		Pts: Griffin 16; Rebs: Griffin 9 Asts: Ebzery 5

Kanteerava Indoor Stadium, Bangalore
Referees: Glenn Cornelio (PHI), Lim Sok Hoon (MAS), Preeda Muongmee (THA)

28 July 2017
17:45

Boxscore

China	71–74	Japan
Scoring by quarter: 15–18, 17–14, 23–22, 16–20
Pts: Shao 16; Rebs: Huang 7 Asts: Shen 6		Pts: Fujioka 19; Rebs: Fujioka, Osaki 8 Asts: Fujioka 14

Kanteerava Indoor Stadium, Bangalore
Referees: Rabah Noujaim (LBN), Yevgeniy Mikheyev (KAZ), Preeda Muongmee (THA)

==== Seventh place game ====
29 July 2017
11:00

Boxscore

North Korea	63–78	Philippines
Scoring by quarter: 13–18, 10–29, 16–17, 24–14
Pts: Kim M. 20; Rebs: Ro 9 Asts: Ro 5		Pts: Lim 16; Rebs: Resultay 10; Asts: Cabinbin 8

Kanteerava Indoor Stadium, Bangalore
Referees: Dallas Pickering (NZL), Gayan Kahingala (SRI), Christopher Reid (AUS)

==== Fifth place game ====
29 July 2017
13:15

Boxscore

New Zealand	45–65	Chinese Taipei
Scoring by quarter: 4–20, 15–13, 13–15, 13–17
Pts: Cocks 10; Rebs: Purcell 10; Asts: Harmon 4		Pts: Bao, Huang P. 10; Rebs: Cheng 9 Asts: Chen, Wu 4

Kanteerava Indoor Stadium, Bangalore
Referees: Preeda Muongmee (THA), Imran Baig (IND), Glenn Cornelio (PHI)

==== Third place game ====
29 July 2017
15:30

Boxscore

South Korea	51–75	China
Scoring by quarter: 19–20, 15–21, 11–17, 6–17
Pts: Park Ji-s. 14; Rebs: Park Ji-s. 11; Asts: Sim 6		Pts: Huang, Li Y. 16; Rebs: Li Y. 11; Asts: Li M. 7

Kanteerava Indoor Stadium, Bangalore
Referees: Lim Sok Hoon (MAS), James Boyer (AUS), Nicolas Fernandes (TAH)

==== Final ====
29 July 2017
20:00

Boxscore

Australia	73–74	Japan
Scoring by quarter: 17–17, 22–16, 14–26, 20–15
Pts: Griffin 30; Rebs: Griffin 15; Asts: Ebzery 6		Pts: Mizushima 26; Rebs: Takada 8 Asts: Machida 9

Kanteerava Indoor Stadium, Bangalore
Referees: Rabah Noujaim (LBN), Snehal Bendke (IND), Yevgeniy Mikheyev (KAZ)

== Division B ==
All times are local (UTC+05:30)

=== Preliminary round ===
==== Group A ====
American Samoa withdrew from competition.

Pos	Team	Pld	W	L	PF	PA	PD	Pts
1	India	2	2	0	180	118	+62	4
2	Uzbekistan	2	1	1	154	131	+23	3
3	Sri Lanka	2	0	2	81	166	−85	2

Source: FIBA
Rules for classification: 1) Points; 2) Head-to-head results; 3) Points difference; 4) Points scored.

23 July 2017
20:00

Boxscore

Uzbekistan	76–92	India
Scoring by quarter: 9–19, 21–24, 23–26, 23–23
Pts: Salavatova 15; Rebs: Averyanova, Koneva 8 Asts: Kashuba 8		Pts: Paul 28; Rebs: Limaye 10; Asts: Akula, Paul 5

Kanteerava Indoor Stadium, Bangalore
Referees: Dallas Pickering (NZL), James Boyer (AUS), Yu Jung (TPE)

24 July 2017
20:00

Boxscore

Sri Lanka	39–78	Uzbekistan
Scoring by quarter: 10–26, 10–27, 12–13, 7–12
Pts: Dapana 14; Rebs: Silva 9 Asts: Beruwalaga 3		Pts: Koneva 19; Rebs: Asanova 12; Asts: Kashuba 8

Kanteerava Indoor Stadium, Bangalore
Referees: Kim Bo-hui (KOR), Matthew Bathurst (NZL), Lee Kyoung-hwan (KOR)

25 July 2017
20:00

Boxscore

Sri Lanka	42–88	India
Scoring by quarter: 10–23, 3–17, 13–19, 16–29
Pts: Dapana 9 Rebs: Silva 8 Asts: Silva 3		Pts: Varghese 19; Rebs: Limaye 10; Asts: Sonkar 6

Kanteerava Indoor Stadium, Bangalore
Referees: Kim Bo-hui (KOR), Yasuhisa Masubuchi (JPN), Tien Hsiao-Lun (TPE)

==== Group B ====
Pos	Team	Pld	W	L	PF	PA	PD	Pts
1	Kazakhstan	3	3	0	206	154	+52	6
2	Lebanon	3	2	1	218	174	+44	5
3	Singapore	3	1	2	219	185	+34	4
4	Fiji	3	0	3	134	264	−130	3

Source: FIBA
Rules for classification: 1) Points; 2) Head-to-head results; 3) Points difference; 4) Points scored.

23 July 2017
15:00

Boxscore

Fiji	38–103	Singapore
Scoring by quarter: 9–35, 12–25, 9–18, 8–25
Pts: Tawake 8 Rebs: Kainamoli 10; Asts: four players 1		Pts: Tan 21; Rebs: three players 6 Asts: Koh 6

Koramangala Indoor Stadium, Bangalore

23 July 2017
18:00

Boxscore

Kazakhstan	62–54	Lebanon
Scoring by quarter: 15–13, 14–11, 21–13, 12–17
Pts: Yagodkina 22; Rebs: Kondrakova 18; Asts: three players 3		Pts: Akl 18; Rebs: Bakhos 6 Asts: Akl 3

Koramangala Indoor Stadium, Bangalore
Referees: Kim Bo-hui (KOR), Matthew Bathurst (NZL), Glenn Cornelio (PHI)

24 July 2017
15:00

Boxscore

Lebanon	90–48	Fiji
Scoring by quarter: 28–11, 17–14, 34–16, 11–7
Pts: Schoucair 21; Rebs: Mokdad 10; Asts: Mokdad 7		Pts: Koyamainavure 13; Rebs: Kainamoli, Koyamainavure 7 Asts: Koyamainavure 4

Koramangala Indoor Stadium, Bangalore
Referees: Yu Jung (TPE), Kim Ok-sim (PRK), Kihamu Matsumoto (JPN)

24 July 2017
18:00

Boxscore

Singapore	52–73	Kazakhstan
Scoring by quarter: 6–9, 18–21, 10–23, 18–20
Pts: Poon 15; Rebs: Lim R. 12; Asts: Tan 2		Pts: Yagodkina 16; Rebs: Kondrakova 12; Asts: Kolesnikova 5

Koramangala Indoor Stadium, Bangalore
Referees: Yasuhisa Masubuchi (JPN), Dallas Pickering (NZL), Christopher Reid (AUS)

25 July 2017
15:00

Boxscore

Kazakhstan	71–48	Fiji
Scoring by quarter: 19–9, 14–7, 16–12, 22–20
Pts: Ossipenko 21; Rebs: Kondrakova 12; Asts: Kolesnikova 5		Pts: Koyamainavure 28; Rebs: four players 5 Asts: Kainamoli 4

Koramangala Indoor Stadium, Bangalore
Referees: Peng Ling (CHN), Gayan Kahingala (SRI), Wang Zebo (CHN)

25 July 2017
18:00

Boxscore

Lebanon	74–64	Singapore
Scoring by quarter: 18–16, 16–15, 21–11, 19–22
Pts: Maalouf 16; Rebs: El Charif 9 Asts: Akl 5		Pts: Poon 20; Rebs: Lim R., Tan 7 Asts: Lim R. 5

Koramangala Indoor Stadium, Bangalore
Referees: Glenn Cornelio (PHI), James Boyer (AUS), Lee Kyoung-hwan (KOR)

=== Knockout round ===
==== Bracket ====
Quarterfinals
27 July
India	93
Fiji	51
27 July
Lebanon	86
Sri Lanka	37
27 July
Uzbekistan	84
Singapore	79

Semifinals
28 July
India	79
Lebanon	69
28 July
Uzbekistan	51
Kazakhstan	77

Final
29 July
India	75
Kazakhstan	73
Third place
29 July
Lebanon	59
Uzbekistan	55

5th place bracket

5–7th place semifinals
28 July
Fiji	65
Sri Lanka	64

Fifth place
29 July
Fiji	65
Singapore	80

==== Quarterfinals ====
27 July 2017
15:00

Boxscore

Uzbekistan	84–79	Singapore
Scoring by quarter: 18–22, 14–15, 33–16, 19–26
Pts: Koneva 26; Rebs: Khusnitdinova 11; Asts: Koneva 7		Pts: Lim M. 18; Rebs: Lim R. 7 Asts: Poon 6

Koramangala Indoor Stadium, Bangalore
Referees: Yu Jung (TPE), Nicolas Fernandes (TAH), Lee Kyoung-hwan (KOR)

27 July 2017
18:00

Boxscore

Lebanon	86–37	Sri Lanka
Scoring by quarter: 25–11, 22–9, 29–10, 10–7
Pts: Moukaddem 16; Rebs: Gyokchian 12; Asts: Moukaddem 6		Pts: Silva 17; Rebs: three players 6 Asts: Durage 3

Koramangala Indoor Stadium, Bangalore
Referees: Dallas Pickering (NZL), Kim Bo-hui (KOR), Kim Ok-sim (PRK)

27 July 2017
20:00

Boxscore

India	93–51	Fiji
Scoring by quarter: 19–11, 23–12, 25–16, 26–12
Pts: Paul 19; Rebs: Rajaganapathi 10; Asts: Sonkar 7		Pts: Koyamainavure 24; Rebs: Koyamainavure 11; Asts: Dobui 5

Kanteerava Indoor Stadium, Bangalore
Referees: Peng Ling (CHN), Joenard Garcia (PHI), Kihamu Matsumoto (JPN)

==== 5–8th place semifinal ====
28 July 2017
15:00

Boxscore

Sri Lanka	64–65	Fiji
Scoring by quarter: 13–16, 15–8, 19–23, 17–18
Pts: Durage, Iddamalgoda 10; Rebs: Gallage, Silva 12; Asts: five players 2		Pts: Koyamainavure 22; Rebs: Tawake 13; Asts: Dobui, Koyamainavure 5

Koramangala Indoor Stadium, Bangalore
Referees: Kim Bo-hui (KOR), Matthew Bathurst (NZL), Wang Zebo (CHN)

==== Semifinals ====
28 July 2017
18:00

Boxscore

Uzbekistan	51–77	Kazakhstan
Scoring by quarter: 13–17, 9–23, 20–15, 9–22
Pts: Sevastyanova 19; Rebs: Averyanova 15; Asts: Sevastyanova 3		Pts: Kurazova 24; Rebs: Kurazova 8 Asts: Yagodkina 6

Koramangala Indoor Stadium, Bangalore
Referees: Yu Jung (TPE), Lee Kyoung-hwan (KOR), Yasuhisa Masubuchi (JPN)

28 July 2017
20:00

Boxscore

Lebanon	69–79	India
Scoring by quarter: 20–16, 18–17, 20–23, 11–23
Pts: Akl 20; Rebs: El Charif 14; Asts: Fares 5		Pts: Palanilkumkalayil 20; Rebs: Palanilkumkalayil 7 Asts: Palanilkumkalayil 6

Koramangala Indoor Stadium, Bangalore
Referees: Kihamu Matsumoto (JPN), James Boyer (AUS), Nicolas Fernandes (TAH)

==== Fifth place game ====
29 July 2017
12:00

Boxscore

Fiji	65–80	Singapore
Scoring by quarter: 7–24, 17–20, 16–16, 25–20
Pts: Koyamainavure 31; Rebs: Koyamainavure 11; Asts: Kainamoli 5		Pts: Lim Z. 26; Rebs: Tan 7 Asts: Chu 5

Kanteerava Indoor Stadium, Bangalore
Referees: Rajnarayan Patro (IND), Matthew Bathurst (NZL), Wang Zebo (CHN)

==== Third place game ====
29 July 2017
15:30

Boxscore

Uzbekistan	55–59	Lebanon
Scoring by quarter: 13–8, 11–17, 17–16, 14–18
Pts: Khusnitdinova 22; Rebs: Averyanova 12; Asts: Sevastyanova 4		Pts: Akl 20; Rebs: El Charif 6 Asts: Akl 5

Kanteerava Indoor Stadium, Bangalore
Referees: Kim Bo-hui (KOR), Joenard Garcia (PHI), Kihamu Matsumoto (JPN)

==== Final ====
29 July 2017
17:45

Boxscore

Kazakhstan	73–75	India
Scoring by quarter: 19–16, 20–15, 19–19, 15–25
Pts: Kondrakova 30; Rebs: Kondrakova 18; Asts: Yagodkina 6		Pts: Palanilkumkalayil 20; Rebs: Limaye 10; Asts: Limaye 6

Kanteerava Indoor Stadium, Bangalore
Referees: Peng Ling (CHN), Lee Kyoung-hwan (KOR), Yu Jung (TPE)

== Final standings ==
=== Division A ===
Qualified for 2018 FIBA Women's Basketball World Cup
Relegated to Division B of the 2019 FIBA Asia Women's Cup

Rank	Team	Record
1st place, gold medalist(s)	Japan	5–1
2nd place, silver medalist(s)	Australia	5–1
3rd place, bronze medalist(s)	China	5–1
4	South Korea	2–4
5	Chinese Taipei	3–3
6	New Zealand	3–3
7	Philippines	1–5
8	North Korea	0–6

=== Division B ===
Promoted to Division A of the 2019 FIBA Asia Women's Cup

Rank	Team	Record
1	India	5–0
2	Kazakhstan	4–1
3	Lebanon	4–2
4	Uzbekistan	2–3
5	Singapore	2–3
6	Fiji	1–5
7	Sri Lanka	0–3

== Statistics and awards ==
=== Statistical leaders ===
Points

Name	PPG
(North Korea) Ro Suk-yong	20.2
(China) Li Yueru	17.2
(Australia) Kelsey Griffin	15.8
(New Zealand) Jillian Harmon	14.0
(Japan) Moeko Nagaoka	13.7

Rebounds

Name	RPG
(New Zealand) Kalani Purcell	10.0
(New Zealand) Jillian Harmon	9.3
(China) Li Yueru	9.3
(Chinese Taipei) Joy Burke	8.7
(Australia) Kelsey Griffin	8.2
(South Korea) Park Ji-su	8.2

Assists

Name	APG
(Japan) Manami Fujioka	8.2
(Japan) Asami Yoshida	6.0
(Japan) Rui Machida	5.2
(China) Li Meng	5.0
(Philippines) France Cabinbin	4.5

Blocks

Name	BPG
(South Korea) Park Ji-su	2.2
(North Korea) Ro Suk-yong	1.5
(Australia) Marianna Tolo	1.4
(China) Huang Hongpin	1.2
(Chinese Taipei) Joy Burke	1.2

Steals

Name	SPG
(Chinese Taipei) Huang Ping-jen	2.8
(Japan) Asami Yoshida	2.3
(China) Shao Ting	1.8
(China) Lu Wen	1.8
(Philippines) Afril Bernardino	1.8
(North Korea) Ro Suk-yong	1.8

=== Awards ===
Most Valuable Player

- (Australia) Kelsey Griffin

All-Tournament Team

- (Japan) Manami Fujioka
- (South Korea) Lim Yung-hui
- (Japan) Moeko Nagaoka
- (Australia) Kelsey Griffin
- (China) Li Yueru
