= 2014 FIBA Asia Under-18 Championship for Women =

22nd FIBA Under-18 Women's Asian Basketball Championship
- Official logo of the 2014 FIBA Asia Under-18 Championship for Women

Tournament details
- Host country: Jordan
- City: Amman
- Dates: 10–17 October
- Teams: 12 (from 1 confederation)
- Venue: 1 (in 1 host city)

Final positions
- Champions: China (14th title)
- Runners-up: Japan
- Third place: South Korea

Tournament statistics
- Top scorer: (Kyrgyzstan) Kolesnichenko (22.0)
- Top rebounds: (South Korea) Park J.S. (15.7)
- Top assists: (India) Sonkar (4.8)
- PPG (Team): China (85.3)
- RPG (Team): Jordan (53.0)
- APG (Team): China (13.9); Japan

Official website
- 2014 FIBA Asia U-18 Championship for Women

The 2014 FIBA Asia Under-18 Championship for Women was the qualifying tournament for FIBA Asia at the 2015 FIBA Under-19 World Championship for Women. The tournament was held in Amman, Jordan from 10 to 17 October 2014.

China defeated Japan in the finals, 60-53 to notch their fourteenth title, while Korea edged Chinese Taipei in the battle for Third Place, 57-54. China, Japan and Korea will represent FIBA Asia at the 2015 FIBA Under-19 World Championship for Women which will be held in Russia.

The championship was divided into two levels: Level I and Level II. The two lowest finishers of Level I met the top two finishers of Level II to determine which teams qualified for the top Level of the 2016 Championships. The losers were relegated to Level II.

== Qualification ==
Rank	Team	Note
1st place, gold medalist(s)	China	Retained in Level I
2nd place, silver medalist(s)	Japan	Retained in Level I
3rd place, bronze medalist(s)	South Korea	Retained in Level I
4	Chinese Taipei	Retained in Level I
5	Thailand	Retained in Level I
6	Malaysia	Relegated to Level II
7	India	Promoted to Level I
8	Hong Kong	Retained in Level II
9	Kazakhstan	
10	Singapore	
11	Sri Lanka	

== Participating teams ==
Level I	Level II
China; Japan; South Korea; Chinese Taipei; Thailand; India	Hong Kong; Jordan; Kazakhstan; Kyrgyzstan; Malaysia; Sri Lanka

== Matches ==
=== Level I ===
Advances to the semifinals
Advances to the qualifying round

Team	Pld	W	L	PF	PA	PD	Pts
China	5	5	0	457	255	+202	10
Japan	5	4	1	402	284	+118	9
South Korea	5	3	2	350	334	+16	8
Chinese Taipei	5	2	3	369	341	+28	7
Thailand	5	1	4	230	422	−192	6
India	5	0	5	328	500	−172	5

10 October 2014
13:00

Boxscore

India	72–124	China
Scoring by quarter: 7–34, 19–30, 22–25, 24–35
Pts: Menon 25; Rebs: Sonkar, Menon 3 Asts: 5 players 1		Pts: Dilana 19; Rebs: Xing J.B. 13; Asts: Zhu M.Q. 4

Prince Hamza Stadium, Amman
Referees: Antoine El Khoury (LIB), Prasad Mapa Mudiyanselage (SRI), Asef Sheha (JOR)

10 October 2014
15:00

Boxscore

Thailand	39–97	Japan
Scoring by quarter: 7–25, 10–20, 15–27, 7–25
Pts: Bunsinprom, Siriphunthanun 6 Rebs: Phosut 5 Asts: Bunsinprom, Thuamon, Phongkwan 1		Pts: H. Akaho 13; Rebs: S. Akaho 11; Asts: Takada 9

Prince Hamza Stadium, Amman
Referees: Ahmed Ali Yaseen Al-Suwaili (IRQ), Alexandr Rulyov (KAZ), Mohammad Fawzi Taha (JOR)

10 October 2014
19:00

Boxscore

South Korea	72–63	Chinese Taipei
Scoring by quarter: 19–18, 25–16, 18–12, 10–17
Pts: Park J.S. 20; Rebs: Park J.S. 17; Asts: Kim H.A., An H.J. 3		Pts: Jhang Y.J. 19; Rebs: Jhang Y.J. 9 Asts: Liu H.J., Li C.C., Chu Y.C. 2

Prince Hamza Stadium, Amman
Referees: Ahmed Ali Yaseen Al-Suwaili (IRQ), Hamlet Arakelyan (KAZ), Ng Pei Yin (MAS)

11 October 2014
13:00

Boxscore

China	91–26	Thailand
Scoring by quarter: 18–9, 25–10, 25–4, 23–3
Pts: Zhang T.T. 20; Rebs: Huang S.J., Zhu M.Q., Liu S.A. 6 Asts: Xing J.B. 5		Pts: Siriphunthanun 8 Rebs: Phosut, Phongkwan 4 Asts: Rungrueang, Phosut 2

Prince Hamza Stadium, Amman
Referees: Hamlet Arakelyan (KAZ), Prasad Mapa Mudiyanselage (SRI), Asef Sheha (JOR)

11 October 2014
15:00

Boxscore

Chinese Taipei	111–70	India
Scoring by quarter: 34–15, 31–23, 32–15, 14–17
Pts: Li C.C. 25; Rebs: Jhang Y.J. 15; Asts: Liu H.J. 11		Pts: Kochuparambu 20; Rebs: Sonkar, Kochuparambu 5 Asts: Sonkar 6

Prince Hamza Stadium, Amman
Referees: Ahmed Ali Yaseen Al-Suwaili (IRQ), Mohammad Fawzi Taha (JOR), Alexandr Rulyov (KAZ)

11 October 2014
19:00

Boxscore

Japan	60–57	South Korea
Scoring by quarter: 22–24, 8–13, 21–4, 9–16
Pts: S. Akaho 17; Rebs: Takada 7 Asts: Takada, Kato 4		Pts: Kim H.A. 15; Rebs: Park J.S. 22; Asts: An H.J. 4

Prince Hamza Stadium, Amman
Referees: Ahmed Ali Yaseen Al-Suwaili (IRQ), Ng Pei Yin (MAS), Mohammad Fawzi Taha (JOR)

12 October 2014
13:00

Boxscore

Chinese Taipei	47–76	China
Scoring by quarter: 13–17, 12–16, 11–22, 11–21
Pts: Liu H.J. 11; Rebs: Liu H.J., Jhang Y.J. 5 Asts: Liu H.J. 3		Pts: Huang S.J. 29; Rebs: Huang S.J. 12; Asts: Zhang M.M. 4

Prince Hamza Stadium, Amman
Referees: Ahmed Ali Yaseen Al-Suwaili (IRQ), Hamlet Arakelyan (KAZ), Ng Pei Yin (MAS)

12 October 2014
15:00

Boxscore

South Korea	85–48	Thailand
Scoring by quarter: 19–17, 18–14, 23–7, 25–10
Pts: Kim H.J. 17; Rebs: Kim Y.H. 17; Asts: An H.J. 4		Pts: Preecha 7 Rebs: Preecha 8 Asts: Supyen, Totong 1

Prince Hamza Stadium, Amman
Referees: Asef Sheha (JOR), Alexandr Rulyov (KAZ), Prasad Mapa Mudiyanselage (SRI)

12 October 2014
19:00

Boxscore

India	47–107	Japan
Scoring by quarter: 19–18, 25–16, 18–12, 10–17
Pts: Kochuparambu 12; Rebs: Venkataraman 7 Asts: Sonkar 4		Pts: Tanaka 25; Rebs: Umezawa 14; Asts: Umezawa 4

Prince Hamza Stadium, Amman
Referees: Ng Pei Yin (MAS), Wissam Zein (SYR), Mohammad Fawzi Taha (JOR)

13 October 2014
13:00

Boxscore

Japan	74–61	Chinese Taipei
Scoring by quarter: 21–20, 17–14, 9–19, 27–8
Pts: S. Akaho 16; Rebs: S. Akaho 12; Asts: Takada 4		Pts: Lo 18; Rebs: Yu Y.W. 6 Asts: Liu H.J. 3

Prince Hamza Stadium, Amman
Referees: Mohammad Fawzi Taha (JOR), Hamlet Arakelyan (KAZ), Prasad Mapa Mudiyanselage (SRI)

13 October 2014
15:00

Boxscore

China	86–46	South Korea
Scoring by quarter: 18–14, 19–14, 31–5, 18–13
Pts: Huang S.J. 20; Rebs: Huang S.J. 10; Asts: Zhang M.M. 4		Pts: Park J.S. 10; Rebs: Park J.S. 9 Asts: 4 players 1

Prince Hamza Stadium, Amman
Referees: Ahmed Ali Yaseen Al-Suwaili (IRQ), Ng Pei Yin (MAS), Ahmad Suleiman Alyousef (JOR)

13 October 2014
19:00

Boxscore

Thailand	68–62	India
Scoring by quarter: 15–16, 16–17, 21–14, 16–15
Pts: Thuamon 20; Rebs: Siriphunthanun 12; Asts: Thuamon 7		Pts: Kochuparambu 17; Rebs: Venkataraman 12; Asts: Sonkar 5

Prince Hamza Stadium, Amman
Referees: Ahmed Ali Yaseen Al-Suwaili (IRQ), Ng Pei Yin (MAS), Mohammad Fawzi Taha (JOR)

14 October 2014
13:00

Boxscore

Chinese Taipei	87–49	Thailand
Scoring by quarter: 21–4, 18–14, 24–15, 24–16
Pts: Li C.C. 18; Rebs: Jhang Y.J. 9 Asts: Liu H.J. 5		Pts: Phosut 12; Rebs: Bunsinprom, Preecha 5 Asts: Thuamon 4

Prince Hamza Stadium, Amman
Referees: Wissam Zein (SYR), Taha Mohammed Nasser Al-Hashedi (YEM), Ng Pei Yin (MAS)

14 October 2014
15:00

Boxscore

India	77–90	South Korea
Scoring by quarter: 26–29, 14–23, 10–17, 27–21
Pts: Kochuparambu 25; Rebs: Pingle 13; Asts: Sonkar 6		Pts: Park J.S. 16; Rebs: Park J.S. 18; Asts: An H.J. 9

Prince Hamza Stadium, Amman
Referees: Alexandr Rulyov (KAZ), Mohammad Fawzi Taha (JOR), Anan Daraghma (PLE)

14 October 2014
19:00

Boxscore

Japan	64–80	China
Scoring by quarter: 14–24, 15–21, 19–12, 16–23
Pts: Takada 18; Rebs: H. Akaho 6 Asts: Takada 3		Pts: Huang S.J. 26; Rebs: Huang S.J. 11; Asts: Zhang M.M. 5

Prince Hamza Stadium, Amman
Referees: Hamlet Arakelyan (KAZ), Asef S.M. Sheha (JOR), Prasad Mapa Mudiyanselage (SRI)

=== Level II ===
Advances to the qualifying round

Team	Pld	W	L	PF	PA	PD	Pts
Malaysia	5	5	0	370	227	+143	10
Hong Kong	5	4	1	306	275	+31	9
Sri Lanka	5	3	2	277	229	+48	8
Kazakhstan	5	2	3	319	292	+27	7
Jordan	5	1	4	222	309	–87	6
Kyrgyzstan	5	0	5	231	393	–162	5

10 October 2014
9:00

Boxscore

Kyrgyzstan	34–95	Malaysia
Scoring by quarter: 5–31, 12–17, 6–21, 11–26
Pts: Kolesnichenko 10; Rebs: Kudaibergenova 10; Asts: Abdilashim 1		Pts: Hiew K.L. 19; Rebs: Chin 8 Asts: Wong S.Q., Teo C.Y. 4

Prince Hamza Stadium, Amman
Referees: Taha Mohammed Nasser Al-Hashedi (YEM), Lee Kyoung-Hwan (KOR), Anan Daraghma (PLE)

10 October 2014
11:00

Boxscore

Kazakhstan	61–70	Sri Lanka
Scoring by quarter: 19–14, 11–25, 13–12, 18–19
Pts: Imambayeva 18; Rebs: Olenberg, Kovalevskaya 7 Asts: Abikeyeva 3		Pts: Samarasinghe 22; Rebs: Samarasinghe 8 Asts: Dapana 3

Prince Hamza Stadium, Amman
Referees: Peter Sonthosh Divaker (IND), Tsung Hsiu-hui (TPE), Wissam Zein (SYR)

10 October 2014
17:00

Boxscore

Jordan	49–55	Hong Kong
Scoring by quarter: 11–12, 9–13, 11–16, 18–14
Pts: Al Hinn 13; Rebs: Al Hinn 17; Asts: Hammad 2		Pts: Cheung W.S., Yam H.Y. 14; Rebs: Yam H.Y. 9 Asts: Cheung W.S. 5

Prince Hamza Stadium, Amman
Referees: Antoine El Khoury (LIB), Preeda Muongmee (THA), Kato Takaki (JPN)

11 October 2014
9:00

Boxscore

Sri Lanka	70–44	Kyrgyzstan
Scoring by quarter: 20–16, 16–5, 19–11, 15–12
Pts: Samarasinghe 23; Rebs: Fernando 8 Asts: Siriwardana, Ravindran 1		Pts: Kolesnichenko 23; Rebs: Kolesnichenko 17; Asts: 4 players 1

Prince Hamza Stadium, Amman
Referees: Kato Takaki (JPN), Peter Sonthosh Divaker (IND), Preeda Muongmee (THA)

11 October 2014
11:00

Boxscore

Hong Kong	78–63 (OT)	Kazakhstan
Scoring by quarter: 19–19, 13–11, 21–18, 10–15, Overtime: 15–0
Pts: Cheung W.S. 21; Rebs: Fong T.Y. 20; Asts: Seung H.Y. 4		Pts: Arzamastseva 19; Rebs: 5 players 8 Asts: Imambayeva, Abikeyeva 2

Prince Hamza Stadium, Amman
Referees: Wissam Zein (SYR), Anan Daraghma (PLE), Taha Mohammed Nasser Al-Hashedi (YEM)

11 October 2014
17:00

Boxscore

Malaysia	89–42	Jordan
Scoring by quarter: 21–10, 19–14, 15–9, 34–9
Pts: Wong R.L. 22; Rebs: E. Lim 10; Asts: Tan H.Y., Chia M.Y., Lee P.L. 4		Pts: Hammad 7 Rebs: Al Hinn, Khuzouz 7 Asts: Sirriyeh, Khuzouz 1

Prince Hamza Stadium, Amman
Referees: Antoine El Khoury (LIB), Lee Kyoung-Hwan (KOR), Tsung Hsiu-hui (TPE)

12 October 2014
9:00

Boxscore

Sri Lanka	50–58	Malaysia
Scoring by quarter: 11–14, 12–12, 13–17, 14–15
Pts: Dapana 15; Rebs: Fernando 11; Asts: Dapana, Ravindran 3		Pts: Hiew K.L. 13; Rebs: Hiew K.L. 16; Asts: Lee P.L. 2

Prince Hamza Stadium, Amman
Referees: Antoine El Khoury (LIB), Tsung Hsiu-hui (TPE), Preeda Muongmee (THA)

12 October 2014
11:00

Boxscore

Kyrgyzstan	66–85	Hong Kong
Scoring by quarter: 1–27, 12–19, 25–24, 28–15
Pts: Kolesnichenko 34; Rebs: Kolesnichenko 18; Asts: Zhusupkazieva, Abdilashim, Nekrasova 1		Pts: Ko T.C. 20; Rebs: Fong T.Y. 12; Asts: Chan T.K. 4

Prince Hamza Stadium, Amman
Referees: Lee Kyoung-Hwan (KOR), Anan Daraghma (PLE), Taha Mohammed Nasser Al-Hashedi (YEM)

12 October 2014
17:00

Boxscore

Kazakhstan	59–45	Jordan
Scoring by quarter: 14–20, 17–6, 20–9, 8–10
Pts: Bagmet 11; Rebs: Abikeyeva 9 Asts: Kovalevskaya 5		Pts: Hammad 13; Rebs: Quran, Khuzouz 8 Asts: Hammad 1

Prince Hamza Stadium, Amman
Referees: Ahmed Ali Yaseen Al-Suwaili (IRQ), Kato Takaki (JPN), Peter Sonthosh Divaker(IND)

13 October 2014
9:00

Boxscore

Malaysia	64–55	Kazakhstan
Scoring by quarter: 11–13, 15–20, 23–5, 15–17
Pts: Tai C.Q. 22; Rebs: Tai C.Q. 7 Asts: Teo C.Y. 3		Pts: Bagmet 11; Rebs: Bagmet 8 Asts: Bagmet 2

Prince Hamza Stadium, Amman
Referees: Tsung Hsiu-hui (TPE), Peter Sonthosh Divaker (IND), Khaldoun Mohammad Al-Desit (JOR)

13 October 2014
11:00

Boxscore

Hong Kong	42–33	Sri Lanka
Scoring by quarter: 17–1, 6–15, 13–8, 6–9
Pts: Lui S.Y. 17; Rebs: Fong T.Y. 17; Asts: Cheung W.S. 3		Pts: Samarasinghe 10; Rebs: Samarasinghe, Fernando 17; Asts: Fernando 2

Prince Hamza Stadium, Amman
Referees: Kato Takaki (JPN), Preeda Muongmee (THA), Lee Kyoung-Hwan (KOR)

13 October 2014
17:00

Boxscore

Jordan	62–52	Kyrgyzstan
Scoring by quarter: 15–11, 17–10, 17–13, 13–18
Pts: Abu Jbara 14; Rebs: Sabbagh 10; Asts: Hammad 3		Pts: Kolesnichenko 25; Rebs: Bakhtybekova 15; Asts: Zhusupkazieva 3

Prince Hamza Stadium, Amman
Referees: Antoine El Khoury (LIB), Taha Mohammed Nasser Al-Hashedi (YEM), Anan Daraghma (PLE)

14 October 2014
9:00

Boxscore

Hong Kong	46–64	Malaysia
Scoring by quarter: 7–12, 14–16, 11–20, 14–16
Pts: Lui S.Y. 14; Rebs: Chen 8 Asts: Cheung W.N. 2		Pts: Tai C.Q. 28; Rebs: Hiew K.L. 9 Asts: Teo C.Y. 3

Prince Hamza Stadium, Amman
Referees: Ahmed Ali Yaseen Al-Suwaili (IRQ), Kato Takaki (JPN), Ahmad Suleiman Alyousef (JOR)

14 October 2014
11:00

Boxscore

Kyrgyzstan	35–81	Kazakhstan
Scoring by quarter: 7–19, 11–14, 14–28, 3–20
Pts: Kolesnichenko 18; Rebs: Kolesnichenko 20; Asts: Kasymova, Abdilashim, Nekrasova 1		Pts: Arzamastseva 12; Rebs: Kovalevskaya 13; Asts: Bagmet 8

Prince Hamza Stadium, Amman
Referees: Preeda Muongmee (THA), Antoine El Khoury (LIB), Khaldoun Mohammad Al-Desit (JOR)

14 October 2014
17:00

Boxscore

Sri Lanka	54–24	Jordan
Scoring by quarter: 6–3, 18–4, 12–8, 18–9
Pts: Dapana 20; Rebs: Fernando 13; Asts: Dapana, De Silva 2		Pts: Hammad 8 Rebs: Quran 12; Asts: Sama'an, Quran, Sabbagh 1

Prince Hamza Stadium, Amman
Referees: Tsung Hsiu-hui (TPE), Lee Kyoung-Hwan (KOR), Peter Sonthosh Divaker (IND)

== Qualifying round ==
Winners are promoted to Level I of the 2016 FIBA Asia Under-18 Championship for Women.

16 October 2014
13:00

Boxscore

Thailand	73–41	Hong Kong
Scoring by quarter: 21–11, 23–8, 14–6, 15–16
Pts: Rungrueang, Bunsinprom 11; Rebs: Bunsinprom, Thuamon, Prajuapsook 9 Asts: Thuamon, Prajuapsook 3		Pts: Fong T.Y. 10; Rebs: Chen 5 Asts: 4 players 1

Prince Hamza Stadium, Amman
Referees: Hamlet Arakelyan (KAZ), Lee Kyoung-Hwan (KOR), Taha Mohammed Nasser Al-Hashedi (YEM)

16 October 2014
15:00

Boxscore

India	81–76	Malaysia
Scoring by quarter: 25–15, 16–11, 23–29, 17–21
Pts: Kochuparambu 29; Rebs: Pingle 9 Asts: Sonkar 8		Pts: Tai C.Q. 25; Rebs: Hiew K.L. 16; Asts: Tai C.Q. 5

Prince Hamza Stadium, Amman
Referees: Kato Takaki (JPN), Anan Daraghma (PLE), Tsung Hsiu-hui (TPE)

== Final round ==
Top three teams qualify to the 2015 FIBA Under-19 World Championship for Women.

Semifinals
16 October 2014
China	80
Chinese Taipei	52
16 October 2014
Japan	83
South Korea	50

Final
17 October 2014
China	60
Japan	53
3rd place
17 October 2014
Chinese Taipei	54
South Korea	57

=== Semifinals ===
16 October 2014
17:00

Boxscore

China	80–52	Chinese Taipei
Scoring by quarter: 17–14, 18–16, 23–17, 22–5
Pts: Huang S.J. 23; Rebs: Zhu M.Q. 9 Asts: Sun L.R. 4		Pts: Lo 15; Rebs: Liu H.J., Hu W.T., Jhang Y.J. 3 Asts: Huang J.C. 4

Prince Hamza Stadium, Amman
Referees: Antoine El Khoury (LIB), Alexandr Rulyov (KAZ), Preeda Muongmee (THA)

16 October 2014
19:00

Boxscore

Japan	83–50	South Korea
Scoring by quarter: 29–11, 18–15, 17–15, 19–9
Pts: Sogabe 17; Rebs: S. Akaho 11; Asts: Takada 6		Pts: Park J.S. 19; Rebs: Park J.S. 7 Asts: An H.J. 3

Prince Hamza Stadium, Amman
Referees: Ahmed Ali Yaseen Al-Suwaili (IRQ), Mohammad Fawzi Taha (JOR), Ng Pei Yin (MAS)

=== 3rd place ===
17 October 2014
14:00

Boxscore

Chinese Taipei	54–57	South Korea
Scoring by quarter: 16–13, 13–17, 16–16, 9–11
Pts: Yu Y.W. 20; Rebs: Jhang Y.J. 17; Asts: Liu H.J. 3		Pts: Park J.S. 20; Rebs: Park J.S. 21; Asts: Kim H.A, Park J.S. 3

Prince Hamza Stadium, Amman
Referees: Antoine El Khoury (LIB), Taha Mohammed Nasser Al-Hashedi (YEM), Alexandr Rulyov (KAZ)

=== Final ===
17 October 2014
16:00

Boxscore

China	60–53	Japan
Scoring by quarter: 22–15, 17–7, 11–19, 10–12
Pts: Zhang T.T., Liu S.A. 14; Rebs: Huang S.J. 10; Asts: Zhang M.M., Wang H.M. 3		Pts: Sogabe, H. Akaho 13; Rebs: H. Akaho 10; Asts: Takada 4

Prince Hamza Stadium, Amman
Referees: Ahmed Ali Yaseen Al-Suwaili (IRQ), Mohammad Fawzi Taha (JOR), Hamlet Arakelyan (KAZ)

== Final standing ==
Qualified for the 2015 FIBA Under-19 World Championship for Women

Rank	Team	Record
1st place, gold medalist(s)	China	7–0
2nd place, silver medalist(s)	Japan	5–2
3rd place, bronze medalist(s)	South Korea	4–3
4	Chinese Taipei	2–5
5	Thailand	2–4
6	India	1–5
7	Malaysia	5–1
8	Hong Kong	4–2
9	Sri Lanka	3–2
10	Kazakhstan	2–3
11	Jordan	1–4
12	Kyrgyzstan	0–5

== Awards ==
2014 Asian Under-18 champions

China
Fourteenth title
