= Consignment store =

Consignment store may mean:

- Consignment store (East Asia) - collection of stalls rented by individual merchants
- Consignment store in North America, where people sell their used goods and receive money for it when a shopper at the consignment store buys the used merchandise; use of the term consignment typically implies an arrangement in which the seller is not the actual owner of the goods, and that the seller and owner will split the profits of sales
