= Ever Bilena =

Philippine cosmetics company

- Type: Private
- Industry: Cosmetics
- Founded: 1983; 43 years ago
- Founder: Dioceldo Sy
- Headquarters: Caloocan, Metro Manila, Philippines
- Key people: Dioceldo Sy (CEO)
- Products: Beauty products
- Number of employees: 1,800 (2020)
- Website: everbilena.com.ph

Ever Bilena, Inc. (EB) is a Philippine cosmetics company based in Caloocan, Metro Manila, Philippines.

== History ==
Ever Bilena started out as a local wholesaler of Taiwan-made nail polish in the Philippines in 1983. The business initial team had only five people and started with a ₱150,000 capital. The cosmetics company, was established by businessman Dioceldo Sy who previously worked for his grandfather's company which sold pomade. Sy later ventured on a business of his own after his grandfather's business folded.

Its early years, coincided with an economic and political crisis which occurred during the last years of President Ferdinand Marcos' administration. It failed to get its nail polish product approved for department store consignment due to unproven reputation of the brand at the time and distributed its products to vendors in Divisoria, Hortaleza, and other smaller retailers.

Ever Bilena experienced growth, posting an expansion of the business by 200 percent in 1985. Its products were eventually made available in major department stores in the Philippines, and Ever Bilena expanded operations in other parts of the country including Visayas and Mindanao.

The company had its own manufacturing plant which was closed in 2004. The following year it released its first product for the body care segment and skin care line.

In mid-2007, Ever Bilena began getting involved in direct selling, at the time, Avon Philippines and Fullerlife Direct Selling (now known as Tupperware Brands Philippines) were among the major players in the direct selling cosmetics industry. In early 2008, it established direct selling operations in Hong Kong, Macau, and Singapore.

== Sponsorships ==
In 2026, Ever Bilena became the official color cosmetics sponsor of Miss Universe Philippines 2026, its first partnership with that specific pageant organization. Ever Bilena is the official sponsor of the Binibining Pilipinas, Miss Philippines Earth, and Miss Earth pageants. It is also the owner of a team in the Philippine Basketball Association, which currently plays as the Blackwater Bossing. It acquired the PBA franchise in 2014.
