= Dioceldo Sy =

Filipino businessman, sportsman and basketball team owner

- Born: Dioceldo S. Sy; March 6, 1958 (age 68); Manila, Philippines
- Education: Philippine School of Business Administration
- Occupations: President and CEO of Ever Bilena Cosmetics, Inc.
- Years active: 1983–present
- Board member of: Ever Bilena Cosmetics, Inc.
- Spouse: Divina Sy (died 2024)
- Partner: Christine Codrington
- Children: 4
- Website: http://www.everbilena.com.ph

Dioceldo S. Sy (born March 6, 1958) is a Filipino businessman, sportsman, and team owner of Blackwater Elite in the Philippine Basketball Association. He is the sole proprietor of Ever Bilena Cosmetics, Inc. which he established in 1983.

== Early life ==
Sy started out as a messenger and clerk for his grandfather's pomade business. Through his grandfather, who was a Chinese immigrant, he learned about trading and dealing with people.

He studied, and at the same time played basketball, at UNO High School during his secondary years and at PSBA for his college education. After two years in college, he dropped out to work full-time for his grandfather. However, when his grandfather's business went bankrupt in 1980, he found himself in the streets and with no job. During this time, he became a freelance trader, buying and selling anything.

In 1983, with his savings from buying and selling, he put up his own cosmetic company, which is now known as Ever Bilena. From a single-line company selling nail polish, Ever Bilena has grown into a major player in the cosmetics industry with over 1,000 products in the market. He has branched out into commercial ventures in food, health drinks, fragrances, soap and detergents.

== Sports and charity work ==
As a sportsman and team owner, he bankrolled several basketball teams that bear the brands of his products, such as Blu Detergent and Shark Energy Drink in the PBL, Ever Bilena Gandang Pinay in the WPBL and Blackwater Sports in the PBA D-League. These teams brought home several championships through the years.

He is former PBL chairman, and has been financing the stints of the Philippine women’s basketball team in several international tournaments and has been known to support charitable causes. He donated a P1.8 Million payloader to the Tacloban city government in the wake of the Yolanda tragedy. He gave Asi Taulava his first break in Philippine basketball by signing him to play for Blu Detergent in the PBL in 1997 and was once close to managing Manny Pacquiao before he became a world champion. He is chairman of the Philippine Secondary School Basketball Championship (PSSBC).
