= Uzbekistan women's national basketball team =

Uzbekistan
- FIBA ranking: 92 ▼3 (14 September 2026)
- Joined FIBA: 1992
- FIBA zone: FIBA Asia
- Coach: Stepan Lebedev

Olympic Games
- Appearances: None

World Cup
- Appearances: None

Asia Cup
- Appearances: 5
- Medals: None
Home	Away

The Uzbekistan women's national basketball team is the women's national basketball team of Uzbekistan. It is administered by the Uzbekistan Basketball Federation.

== Current roster ==
Roster for the 2017 FIBA Women's Asia Cup.

Uzbekistan women's national basketball team roster
Players
Coaches

Pos.	No.	Name	Age – Date of birth	Height	Club	Ctr.
G	4	Yuliya Kashuba	29 – 2 December 1987	1.70 m (5 ft 7 in)
G	5	Anastasiya Sevastyanova	30 – 19 February 1987	1.68 m (5 ft 6 in)
F	6	Gulnaz Nauruzbaeva	27 – 9 November 1989	1.74 m (5 ft 9 in)
F	7	Elena Khusnitdinova	32 – 3 May 1985	1.77 m (5 ft 10 in)
G	8	Tatyana Komarova	20 – 27 December 1996	1.67 m (5 ft 6 in)
F	9	Khristina Avdeeva	26 – 9 December 1990	1.75 m (5 ft 9 in)
G	10	Natalya Koneva	28 – 2 June 1989	1.72 m (5 ft 8 in)
F	11	Elvira Salavatova	17 – 17 September 1999	1.83 m (6 ft 0 in)
F	12	Irina Averyanova	33 – 14 March 1984	1.88 m (6 ft 2 in)
C	13	Dlyara Asanova	20 – 19 October 1996	1.91 m (6 ft 3 in)
F	14	Katerina Ejova	17 – 17 October 1999	1.78 m (5 ft 10 in)
C	15	Aliya Samatova	23 – 10 May 1994	1.94 m (6 ft 4 in)

Head coach

- (Uzbekistan) Stepan Lebedev

Assistant coach(es)

- (Uzbekistan) Jakhongir Khodjaev

Legend

- Club – describes last
  club before the tournament
- Age – describes age
  on 23 July 2017

== Records ==
#	Year	M	MW	ML	PF	PA	PD
1	2009 FIBA Asia Under-16 Championship for Women	DNE					
2	2011 FIBA Asia Under-16 Championship for Women	5	1	4	253	345	-92
3	2013 FIBA Asia Under-16 Championship for Women	DNE					
4	2015 FIBA Asia Under-16 Championship for Women	5	0	5	206	375	-169
5	2017 FIBA Under-16 Women's Asian Championship	DNE					
6	2022 FIBA Under-16 Women's Asian Championship	DNE					
7	2023 FIBA Under-16 Women's Asian Championship	DNE					
Total	2/7	10	1	9	459	720	-261

== See also ==
- Uzbekistan women's national under-19 basketball team
- Uzbekistan women's national under-17 basketball team
- Uzbekistan women's national 3x3 team
