= Kyrgyzstan women's national under-18 basketball team =

Kyrgyzstan national youth basketball team

Kyrgyzstan
- FIBA zone: FIBA Asia
- National federation: Kyrgyz Basketball Federation

U19 World Cup
- Appearances: None

U18 Asia Cup
- Appearances: 2
- Medals: None

U18 Asia Cup Division B
- Appearances: 1
- Medals: None

The Kyrgyzstan women's national under-18 basketball team is a national basketball team of Kyrgyzstan, administered by the Kyrgyz Basketball Federation. It represents the country in international under-18 women's basketball competitions.

== FIBA Under-18 Women's Asia Cup participations ==
Year	Division A	Division B
1996	7th	
1998	Withdrew	
2014	12th	
2024		7th

== See also ==
- Kyrgyzstan men's national basketball team
