= Clare Bodensteiner =

New Zealand basketball player

Clare Bodensteiner (born 31 October 1984 in Christchurch) is a New Zealand female basketball player. She played college basketball at Stanford University, and was also a member of the New Zealand women's national basketball team, known as the Tall Ferns, at the 2008 Summer Olympics in Beijing, China.

Bodensteiner graduated from Stanford University, where she played college basketball for the Stanford Cardinal. She also received an undergraduate degree in psychology, and a Master of Science degree major in education. She also tried out for the New Zealand national team in 2008, until she was officially elected to play for the Olympics, along with former Stanford teammate Jillian Harmon, shortly after weeks of training.

Bodensteiner is currently resided in Seattle, Washington with her family of 6, including her dog.
