= Joy Burke =

Taiwanese-American basketball player

Joy Burke 包喜樂
Personal information
- Born: November 7, 1990 (age 36) Chiayi, Taiwan
- Listed height: 6 ft 5 in (1.96 m)
- Listed weight: 176 lb (80 kg)

Career information
- High school: Marcos de Niza High School
- College: Arizona State (2009–2014)
- Playing career: 2014–present
- Position: Center

Career history
- 2014–2015: (Denmark) Hørsholm 79ers
- 2015–2016: (Australia) Bendigo Spirit
- 2016–2019: (Australia) Ballarat Rush

Career highlights
- Dameligaen Champion (2015)
Medals
Representing Chinese Taipei
Basketball

Joy Marie Burke (born November 7, 1990), also known by her Taiwanese name Pao Hsi-lo (Chinese: 包喜樂), is a Taiwanese-American collegiate and professional basketball player. Burke played college basketball for the Arizona State University. Following graduation she has played professionally overseas for the Hørsholm 79ers, Bendigo Spirit, and in 2015 she made her national team debut as a member of the Chinese Taipei women's national basketball team.

== Early life ==
Joy was born in 1990 in Chiayi, Taiwan, the daughter of Steve Burke and Ming-Hui Burke. She is the oldest of two children. Her father Steve Burke is White American, and travelled to Taiwan to preach as a Christian priest, and her mother Ming-Hui Burke is from Kaohsiung in southern Taiwan.

Growing up Burke has lived in Kenting in Pingtung County and Kaohsiung. She is fluent in both Mandarin and English. Her younger brother Timothy James (TJ) Burke was born in Kaohsiung, Taiwan in March 1993. Burke was featured in a shampoo advert when she was four years old.

Burke attended Morrison Academy, a private conservative Christian school, in Taichung until she was twelve. Burke was a little shy as one of the tallest in her class. In the summers, Burke and TJ, would receive workbooks to study instead of playing with other children. Burke thrived and did not need help from her parents with her homework. Burke emigrated with her family to live in the United States when she was twelve.

== High school ==
Burke attended Marcos de Niza High School in Tempe, Arizona and played basketball on the Arizona Elite Girls Basketball Club. According to Burke she never was never interested in basketball growing up, and had never touched a basketball. She was originally hoping to pursue ballet. On Burke's first day of high school she was asked by the school coach to consider taking up basketball, and she gradually felt interested, and practiced. Burke enjoyed an outstanding career in high school and is ranked among the top post players in the country, and was one of the top 100 basketball recruits in the nation. She was named to the All-City Basketball Team in 2007, 2008, and 2009. She holds the school's single-game record for most free throws with 17, and scored 51 of her team's 68 points in a Nike Tournament of Champions to secure her team the victory. She captained her team in two seasons.

Burke subsequently earned numerous awards during her high school career, including being named the Pima Region Player of the Year and Defensive Player of the Year. She received the Kori Jacobson Excellence Award given to the top female athlete of the year in the Tempe Union High School District, based upon athletics, scholarship, and community service, and recipient of a Tempe All-City Banquet. She is a McDonald's All-American nominee and was also named to the Arizona Republic's All-Arizona Team, earning all-city accolades three times.

As a junior, she averaged 19.5 points, 13.3 rebounds, 5.3 blocks, 3.3 steals and 1.3 assists per game. This increased when she became a senior and she averaged 23.3 points, 17.8 rebounds, 7.5 blocks and 3.9 steals per game, and connected on 63 percent of her field goal attempts. At the end of her junior year Burke was offered full-ride basketball scholarships from over 40 Division One universities.

Burke also lettered in volleyball. In addition to her achievements on the court, Burke has been the recipient of numerous awards and accolades off court, including being named the Tempe Top Teen, English Student of the Year, Homecoming Queen, and earning Scholar-Athlete honors four times, and was a member of the National Honor Society. Burke ranked 17th in a class of 463 seniors and carried a 4.0 grade point average. She was also served as a translator for students who spoke Chinese. Joy also attended Gethsemane Lutheran Church in Tempe AZ, where her father was the music director.

== College career ==
After graduating from Marcos de Niza High School in 2009, Burke attended Arizona State University from 2009–2014. She had taken the opportunity of a basketball scholarship for a college education and cited the chance to live in different countries as a reason. She majored in marketing, and graduated from UA with a bachelor's and master's degrees in marketing in just five years in 2014. Burke's major in business marketing was more of an accident than a choice. When she first applied to ASU, she clicked a drop-down menu for majors and hastily chose Business Marketing. She said she didn’t think know she could scroll down for 'undecided'.

Burke was in ASU's Barrett Honors College. In the same period, she played for the Arizona State Sun Devils women's basketball in NCAA Division I.

=== Arizona State statistics ===
Legend
GP	Games played	GS	Games started	MPG	Minutes per game
FG%	Field goal percentage	3P%	3-point field goal percentage	FT%	Free throw percentage
RPG	Rebounds per game	APG	Assists per game	SPG	Steals per game
BPG	Blocks per game	PPG	Points per game	**Bold**	Career high

Year	Team	GP	Points	FG%	3P%	FT%	RPG	APG	SPG	BPG	PPG
2009-10	Arizona State	24	48	48.7%	0.0%	40.0%	1.7	0.1	0.0	0.3	2.0
2010-11	Arizona State	32	44	42.9%	0.0%	**63.6%**	1.9	0.1	0.2	0.1	1.6
2011-12	Arizona State	**33**	12	40.0%	na	50.0%	1.9	-	-	**1.0**	1.5
2012-13	Arizona State	31	221	41.7%	26.7%	59.7%	**6.1**	**0.6**	**0.5**	1.0	7.1
2013-14	Arizona State	**33**	**240**	**51.4%**	50.0%	57.3%	4.8	0.4	0.2	0.5	**7.3**
Career		123	277	46.1%	24.2%	55.9%	2.4	0.2	0.2	0.4	2.3

== Career ==
Europe

After graduating from college in 2014, Burke headed to Denmark and signed with the Hørsholm 79ers in the Dameligaen. She had a successful season, playing in 26 games, and averaging 14 points and 11.2 rebounds, and ranked third in the league in rebounds per game. Burke was instrumental to Hørsholm securing their first league championship title in five years when she almost single-handedly lead the team to victory.

Australia

Burke signed with the Bendigo Spirit in Australia for the 2015–16 WNBL season. After inconsistent showings, Burke has not been re-signed for the following season. However, Burke remained in Australia to participate in the SEABL playing for the Ballarat Rush.

Burke had an outstanding first season in the SEABL averaging a double-double with 15.1 points and 12.4 rebounds per game. She was ranked third in the league for total rebounds with 272 and second in blocks with 39. Burke received SEABL Team of the Week honours on five occasions, and was named the player of the week after she scored 34 points and had 18 rebounds in a single game. Burke achieved 13 double-doubles with 11 coming from the final 13 games of the seasons. In 2016 she was crowned the Ballarat Rush Robyn Maher MVP.

In her third season with the SEABL Burke averaged a further double, double with 14.1 points and 11.65 rebounds per game in 2018. She was the league's leading rebounder with a total of 233 rebounds. Burke had played in the previous SEABL seasons under her English name and on her American passport, but the SEABL introduced a new bylaw for the inclusion on Asian born athletes to be classified as unrestricted players. Despite being born in Taiwan and having played with the Chinese Taipei National Team, she was required to complete all necessary visa applications using her Taiwanese passport.

Career data

Legend
GP	Games played	GS	Games started	MPG	Minutes per game
FG%	Field goal percentage	3P%	3-point field goal percentage	FT%	Free throw percentage
RPG	Rebounds per game	APG	Assists per game	SPG	Steals per game
BPG	Blocks per game	PPG	Points per game	**Bold**	Career high

Season(s)	League	Team	GP	MPG	FG%	3P%	FT%	RPG	APG	SPG	BPG	PPG
2014–15	(Denmark) Danish Women's Basketball League	Hørsholm 79ers	26	31:15	58.3%	0%	63.4%	11.2	1.0	.6	.1	14.0
2015–16	(Australia) Women's National Basketball League	Bendigo Spirit	24	11:35	38.1%	0%	56.7%	2.7	.2	.1	.4	2.7
2016–17	(Australia) South East Australian Basketball League	Ballarat Rush	22		50.2%	0%	**64.9%**	**12.4**	1.5			**15.1**
2017–18	(Australia) South East Australian Basketball League	Ballarat Rush	16		**50.3%**	20%	62.7%	11.8	**1.8**			14.1
2018–19	(Australia) South East Australian Basketball League	Ballarat Rush	20		50.0%	**40.7%**	60.6%	11.7	.9			14.1

== National team ==
Burke made her national team debut, as a member of the 2015 Chinese Taipei National Team that participated in the 37th William Jones Cup. Standing 1.96m tall, Burke is the tallest player in the team's history. She would go on to represent at the 2015 FIBA Asia Women's Championship, and was pivotal in securing Chinese Taipei two crucial game victories which enabled the team a finishing place in the competition's top four finalists.

Burke participated in the Team Americas versus Team World match at the Aurora Games on August 22, 2019, in Albany, New York. Selected to play on Team World, she was one of the highly regarded players to feature in the basketball segment of the inaugural all-women sports and entertainment festival, a matchup of the best female basketball players in the world. Burke lead Team World to an 85-77 victory over Team Americas. Other than during a 10-point run, which turned a 7-0 deficit into a 10-7 lead, Team Americas was playing from behind the entire game.

William Jones Cup

Year	Tournament	National Team	GP	MPG	FG%	3P%	FT%	RPG	APG	SPG	BPG	PPG
2015	2015 William Jones Cup	Chinese Taipei A (Blue)	3	25:46	48.0%	0%	62.5%	8.7	.3	.3	2.0	9.7
2018	2018 William Jones Cup	Chinese Taipei A (Blue)	3	22:18	30.0%	0%	50.0%	5.0	2.0	1.7	.3	4.3

FIBA Women's Asia Cup

Tournament	National Team	GP	MPG	FG%	3P%	FT%	RPG	APG	SPG	BPG	PPG
2015 FIBA Asia Women's Championship	Chinese Taipei	7	19.6	61.4%	0%	57.1%	6.3	.3	.6	.7	8.3
2017 FIBA Women's Asia Cup	Chinese Taipei	6	20.8	50.9%	60.0%	52.9%	8.7	.7	1.0	1.2	11.3

== Personal life ==
Burke devotes significant time to charities and community events and is an active supporter of Nonprofit organizations.

Her younger brother TJ Burke TJ Burke played college basketball at UC Riverside, and he cites as his biggest athletics influence.
