= Consignment store (East Asia) =

Consignment store (Chinese: 格仔鋪) is a transformation of flea market, which sets up many transparent boxes in a small shop for people to rent and sell their products. The renters can also treat the boxes as showrooms and display their products or artworks there. This kind of shop was originated in Japan and the concept spread in Hong Kong, Taiwan and Macau between 2000 and 2005. However, the business environment of consignment shop had deteriorated since 2010.

Consignment store in Hong Kong

== History ==
Consignment stores were founded in Tokyo's Akihabara shopping district and Hirai Toshio originated the idea. At that time, second-hand toys and antique toys were mainly sold. The store was popular among young men and white-collar workers in Japan when this concept had just started, and it had aroused the mass media's attention for reporting. Since the consignment stores became really popular in Japan, the idea developed in Taiwan, Hong Kong and Macau. In 2001, the first consignment store in Taipei was established in Ximending (Chinese:西門町). The first consignment store in Hong Kong was set up in 2000 in Central, however, since this selling concept was not well known and accepted by citizens at that time thus the store was closed after a short period of time. The concept became popular in Hong Kong in around 2005. Consignment stores started appearing in Mongkok gradually, and almost 100 stores were opened within one year. In 2007, this concept was spread to different cities in mainland China, such as Guangzhou and Shenzhen.

== Location ==
Consignment store in Sha Tin, Hong Kong

Most of the consignment stores are located in shopping malls in crowded districts. For example, some are located in Lucky Plaza (Sha Tin) and Sino Centre (Mong Kok). These places are selected because of the low rent rate and the high popularity among young generation. Together with convenient transportation, it is beneficial for both shoppers and renters to sell and buy the products.

== Features ==
Consignment stores mostly contain over 100 boxes (with an approximate volume of 35x35x35cm). The transparent plastic depots are leased to potential renters to sell their products and post promotional leaflets for advertising. Products are appealing to customers on the grounds of low price. The diversification of products helps enlarge the targets of potential customers. In some boxes, samples of products would be sold. At the stage when the development of online shops was not thriving, those samples played an important role in having supplementary effects, which are being promotion of the online shop or the extra stocks sold in a concrete shop with small quantities.

Rents are adjusted according to boxes' positions with the range of about $200–$500 per month. The more significant the place, the more expensive the rent is. Commonly, the boxes placed in the middle of the column would be the most expensive, for example, the third and fourth ones at a column of six.

Consignment shops provide different services that appear to be attractive to potential renters. Flexibility of renting contracts is a crucial element. Contracts can be as short as three-month or even monthly contracts can be set. They allows people, who first start the business, to adapt to the market's needs and can quit more easily if they fail to make profits. Moreover, some shops offer a comprehensive online system for renters to check the quantity of products sold and profits daily. The convenience helps pave the way for distant monitoring of the sales of their boxes.

== Advantages ==
From the perspective of the owners of consignment stores, they have no worries about purchasing what type of products as the renters would consign different kinds of goods to the stores.

Regarding the renters, the idea of consignment stores is helpful for young people who want to establish their business yet do not have adequate resources to set up their own stores. They can gain experience in running business and understand more about customers' priority on consumption when consigning their goods. Also, renting the boxes in consignment stores can reduce the operating costs, for instance the renters do not need to pay for electricity or other sundry expenses.

Consignment stores are usually centralized in the same floor or area in shopping malls so that customers can compare the products easily in the diversified world of boxes. Also, customers can purchase different types of products in one store so that they can shop more conveniently.

== Disadvantages ==
Though consignment store is famous for its great varieties of products, products' qualities are always questioned. The common problem with cosmetic products would be the authorization. Some are found to be pirated. Even more, some models are found to be never circulated in the market by the brand. Not only do these products jeopardize users' health, but they could also induce violation of intellectual property right. Both shop owners and corresponding renters may be prosecuted. Moreover, a news reported that one store sold unregistered medicine, which misled the customers unethically. Meanwhile, there is no warranty given. Customers have to bear the responsibilities of quality check.

Renters also have to bear the risk of low sales rate. Though some shops provide advertisements, for instance, a shop in Sino Centre uses LCD to showcase products sold in the shop, it is not a common practice as the cost of promotion would add burden to the operating cost. What's more, no promotion would be provided by the shopkeepers as some would have less efforts and passion in selling others' products.

== Importance ==
Fashionable sign

As the quantity of goods purchased could be in small amount, renters could always import the newest goods from other countries, especially from Japan. Also, It is important to sell the most trendy goods in order to suit the taste of the younger generations, who are the greatest part of customers. This makes consignment stores become the first-handed informative centre of fashion.

Encouragement to DIY products

The appearance of consignment stores could greatly encourage the production of DIY goods. For example, people who love making accessories could step out and sell their products. This is welcomed by some, as this platform provides them flexibility to showcase their interest and efforts without affecting their career, and profits might be foreseeable.

For other independent designers, consignment stores are helpful. Before producing their products in great amount, they could first sell some sample products in the boxes for testing the market's response as consultation.

Transformation of customers' role

Consignment stores offer spaces for people who are interested in selling their products yet do not have adequate operating tactics. The easiness motivates more participation from consumers. Slowly, people transform from consumers to prosumers. Not only do they consume goods, but they can also sell their products by using this platform with low cost.

== The decline of consignment stores ==
The decline of consignment stores started from 2010. There are various reasons causing the recession.

The competition between consignment stores is intense. With the popularity among young generation, the number of consignment stores suddenly increased within a year. More stores provide no space for price war and low price goods are no longer a trick for specific shop. The products consigned are similar in different shops and reduce the frequency of customers visiting different stores. This reduce the competitiveness of individual renters as well as the consignment stores.

With inflation, the rent of the stores increases rapidly. This leads to the increase of rent of boxes consequently. There was an example about consignment stores in Sha Tin which increased fifty percent of rent within two years. Yet, there was no significant increase in sales of the stores to alleviate the burden of rent. Renting the boxes is not beneficial to people who want to establish their business with limited resources.

The rapid growth of online shops is one of the main reasons contributing to the decline of consignment stores. The operating cost of online shops is low without the need to rent a place and advertisements can easily be conducted on forums and social platforms.

== See also ==
- Cube shops in Hong Kong
