= Natalya Koneva =

Uzbekistani basketball player (born 1989)

Personal information
- Born: June 2, 1989 (age 37)
- Listed height: 172 cm (5 ft 8 in)
- Position: Forward
- Number: 10
Medals
Representing Uzbekistan
Women's 3x3 basketball
Asian Indoor and Martial Arts Games
Silver medal – second place	Ashgabat 2017	team

Natalya Koneva (born 2 June 1989) is an Uzbekistani female basketball player. She plays as a forward for the Uzbekistan team. She represented Uzbekistan at the 2017 FIBA Women's Asia Cup and was also the part of the Uzbekistani 3x3 basketball team which claimed a silver medal at the 2017 Asian Indoor and Martial Arts Games held in Turkmenistan.
