= Manami Fujioka =

Japanese basketball player

Manami Fujioka 藤岡 麻菜美
No. 1 – JX-Eneos Sunflowers
- Position: Point guard
- League: JBL

Personal information
- Born: 1 February 1994 (age 32) Chiba, Japan
- Listed height: 5 ft 7 in (1.70 m)
- Listed weight: 132 lb (60 kg)

Career information
- High school: Chiba Eiwa (Yachiyo, Chiba)
- College: Tsukuba (2012–2016)
- WNBA draft: 2016: undrafted
- Playing career: 2016–present

Career history
- 2016–present: JX-Eneos Sunflowers
Medals
Women's basketball
Representing Japan
FIBA Asia Under-16 Championship for Women
Silver medal – second place	2009 Pune	Japan U17
Silver medal – second place	2012 China	U18 Team
FIBA Asia Cup
Gold medal – first place	2017 India

Manami Fujioka (藤岡 麻菜美 born 1 February 1994) is a Japanese professional basketball player.

== Career ==
=== WJBL ===
Fujioka began her professional career with the Kashiwa-based JX–ENEOS Sunflowers, for the 2016–17 season.

== National team ==
=== Youth Level ===
Fujioka made her international debut at the 2009 FIBA Asia Under-16 Championship in India where Japan took home the silver medal. She was then named to the team for the 2010 FIBA Under-17 World Championship in France, where Japan finished the tournament in fifth place. In 2012, Fujioka took part in the 2012 FIBA Asia Under-18 Championship, where Japan again placed second and qualified for the World Championship the following year. At the 2013 FIBA Under-19 World Championship in Lithuania, Japan placed eighth.

=== Senior Level ===
Fujioka made her debut with the senior national team, at the 2017 FIBA Women's Asia Cup in Bangalore, India.
