= Saki Mizushima =

Japanese basketball player

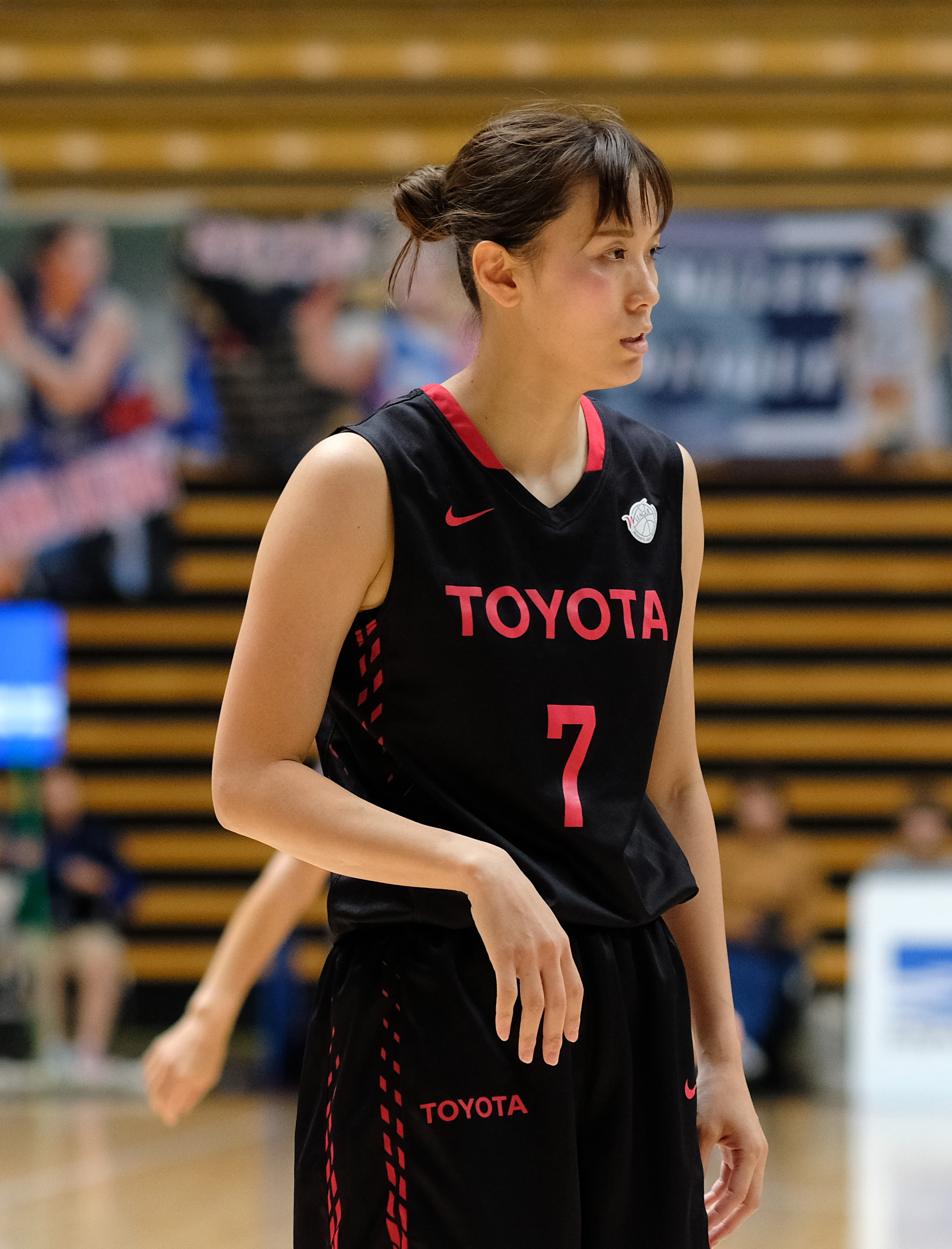

Personal information
- Born: 24 April 1991 (age 35) Tochigi, Japan
- Listed height: 5 ft 7 in (1.70 m)
- Listed weight: 130 lb (59 kg)

Career information
- WNBA draft: 2013: undrafted
- Position: Shooting guard
- Number: 7

Saki Mizushima (水島 沙紀, Mizushima Saki; born 24 April 1991) is a Japanese basketball player for Toyota Antelopes and the Japanese national team.

She participated at the 2017 FIBA Women's Asia Cup.
