= Cube shops in Hong Kong =

Cube shop (Chinese: 格仔舖) is a special kind of shop that contain a lot of boxes. The whole shop is decorated by many transparent plastic cupboards which are divided into five to six cubic boxes with around 35x35x35cm each. Individuals can consign their second-hand or designed products for sale by renting a cube at a low cost.

== Origin ==
The concept of cube shop came from Japan in 2000, which was consigned for the sale of second-hand toys. This new concept of boutique was soon spread to Taiwan in 2001. In 2006, the mode of cube shop spread to Hong Kong and mainly located in the second-level of shopping centres in Mongkok and Causeway Bay. Products including toys, ornaments and cosmetics can be found, providing sales opportunities to cockroach capitalists and individuals.

Currently, cube shops can be found in many shopping malls in Hong Kong, selling fashionable and trendy goods which attract mainly teenagers to buy. Thus, there are other elements find in cube shops in Hong Kong including the consignation of clothes and even services.

== Operation mode ==
The storekeepers generally rent a shop in a shopping centre (e.g. Causeway Place in Causeway Bay) and design the shop with cubic cupboards. They usually display their items for sale in the cubes or rent the cubes to the tenants. Tenants could rent their desired cubes and sell their items (whatever that could be accommodated in the cubes). The rents for each cube ranges from as little as HKD100 TO HKD3,000 per month, depending on the size and position of the cubes. For example, if the cube is bigger and is located at the eye-level of the glass window, it has the most expensive rent as it is the most eye-catching.

Apart from renting the cubes, some store owners also collect commissions from the cubes, the commission ranges from 10-40% of the total income of the cubes. Since there are so many cubes and it is impossible for every tenant to look after the cubes all the time, the storekeepers usually record down the products and transactions for both helping the tenants to manage their business and collecting commissions.

The items in the cubes are usually small items of cheap costs. Since the cubes are not big, small items are good for accommodation and more styles of the products could be displayed. Some store owners would reserve some cubes for selling their own products, and renting most of the cubes to tenants. It can be seen that renting the cubes to tenants is more popular to the store owners as the income from renting is more steady and profitable.

== Potential risks ==
=== Grid owner ===
As the shopkeeper has the ultimate power to open or close the shop, the renters of the grids may not be able to get back their goods or money of rent from the shopkeeper. There are news about shopkeeper suddenly closed the shop and the grid owners had paid for six months rent and could not get back the money.

=== Purchaser ===
One of the main concerns is that the goods the cube shops sell may be a fake of a brand and there is quality concern. One example is color contact lenses sold in cube shops were tested and found that pigment was painted on the lenses only instead of paint under a cover. This would cause hygienic problem and were not regulated under medical equipment.
