= Women's Philippine Basketball League =

- Sport: Basketball
- Founded: 1998
- Folded: 2008
- No. of teams: 12
- Country: Philippines
- Last champion: Ever Bilena
- Most titles: Ever Bilena (3 titles)
- Website: www.pbl.org.ph/wpbl.php

The Women's Philippine Basketball League was a semi-professional women's basketball league in the Philippines.

It was originally formed in 1998 as the women's counterpart to the Philippine Basketball League. The league went on hiatus from 2000 until it was revived in 2008. The league was revived by Mikee Romero.

However, the league quickly folded after that season.

The league, at least for the 2008 season, was sanctioned by the Samahang Basketbol ng Pilipinas, the country's national basketball federation.

Ever Bilena team of Dioceldo Sy dominated the league, winning all three seasons.

== Teams ==
- Bacchus Energy Drink- St. Scholastica's College
- Ever Bilena- University of Santo Tomas
- Mail and More- Chiang Kai Shek College
- Muscle Tape- Lyceum of the Philippines University Lady Pirates
- Nutri-C- Ateneo de Manila University
- Oracare- De La Salle-College of Saint Benilde
- Oracle Residences- Far Eastern University
- Smart Buddy- University of the Philippines
- Sunkist- De La Salle University
- Discovery Suites- RP Women's Seniors Team
- Xtreme Magic Sing- RP Women's Youth Team

== Champions ==
Season	Champion	Format	Series	Runner-Up
1998	Ever Bilena			Chowking
1999	Ever Bilena			
2008	Ever Bilena Gandang Pinay	2-of-3	2–0	Smart Buddy-University of the Philippines
