= Aida Bakhos =

Lebanese basketball player

ِAida Bakhos
Personal information
- Born: 21 March 1986 (age 40) Beirut
- Listed height: 5.8 ft 0 in (1.77 m)

Career information
- High school: Midland Lee (2005)
- College: Lamar University (2008)
- Drafted by: Al-Reyadhi Club, B. Loewen
- Position: Forward

Career history
- 2017–2018: Al Riyadi club
- 2018–2019: SG Bergische Löwen club] (Germany)

Aida Bakhos (born 21 March 1986) is a Lebanese basketball forward player. She joined the Lebanon women's national basketball team in 2017, and played for the Homenetmen Antelias club in Beirut. She attended Lamar University until 2008.

== Career ==
Bakhos participated in club competitions in the 2017–18 season with Al Riyadi club and in the 2018–19 season with SG Bergische Löwen club in Germany.

With the national team, she participated in the 11, 17, and 21 seasons. At the division B of the 2017 FIBA Women's Asia Cup Bakhos represented Lebanon and her stats in 6 games at that event were: 6.7ppg, 4.7rpg, 1.3apg, FGP: 29.3%, 3PT: 25.0%, FT: 65.0%. Lebanon finished 2nd in that tournament.

== Achievements ==
Aida received the Eurobasket.com Mediterranean Cup All-Defensive Team award in 2018. Bakhos has won over 10 League and Cup championships over her career (Lebanese Cup 4x, Lebanese League Champions 4x, WABA Cup Winner, Mediterranean Cup Winner).
