= Sakura Akaho =

Japanese basketball player

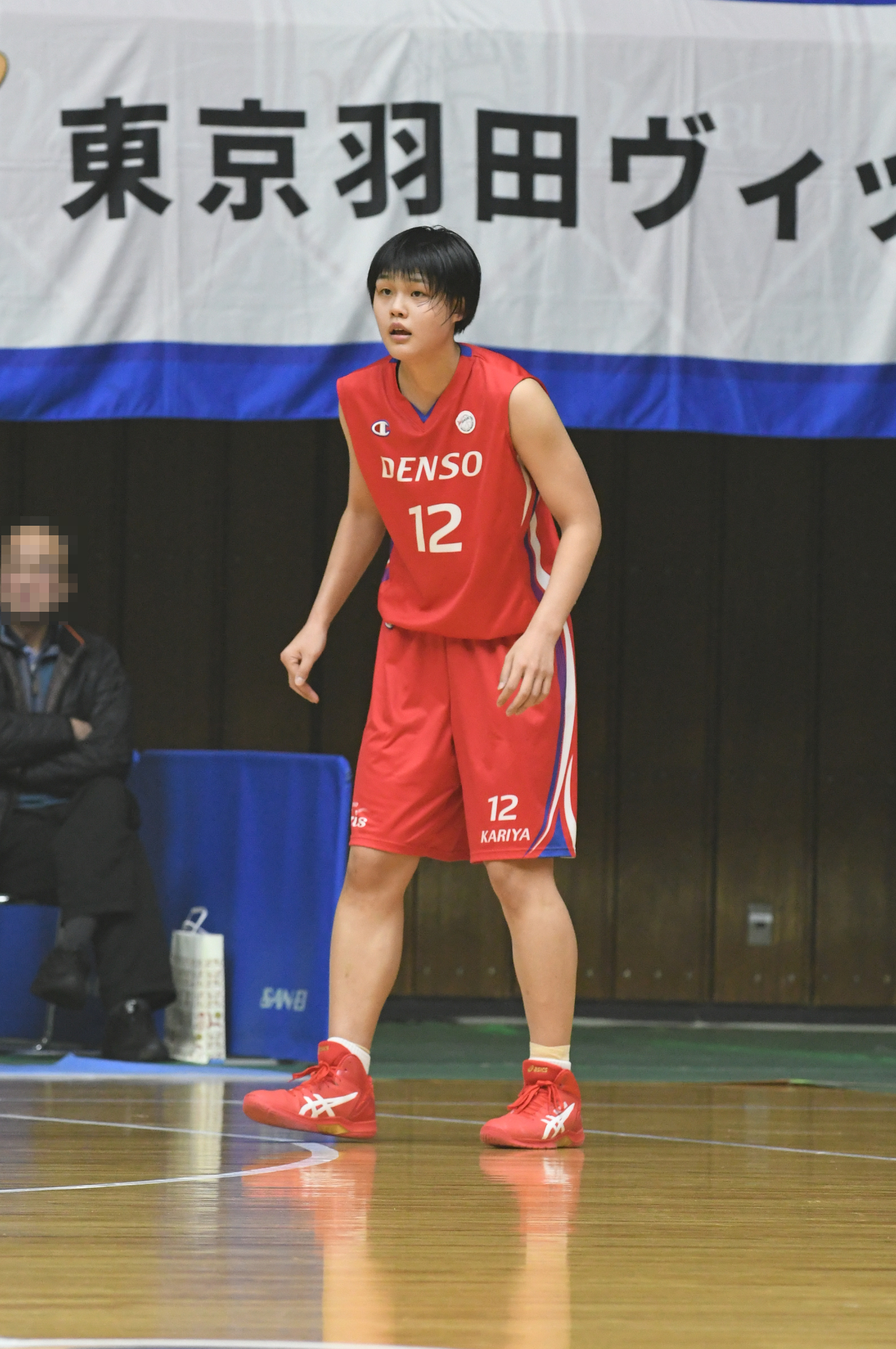

No. 39 – Denso Iris
- Position: Small forward
- League: JBL

Personal information
- Born: April 30, 1996 (age 30) Nanao, Ishikawa, Japan
- Listed height: 5 ft 11 in (1.80 m)
Medals
Women's basketball
Representing Japan
FIBA Asia U16 Championship
Gold medal – first place	2011 Jinan	Japan U17
FIBA Asia Under-18 Championship for Women
Silver medal – second place	2014 Amman	Japan U19
FIBA Asia Cup
Gold medal – first place	2017 India

Sakura Akaho (赤穂 さくら, Akaho Sakura; born April 30, 1996) is a Japanese basketball player for Denso Iris and the Japanese national team.

She participated at the 2017 FIBA Women's Asia Cup.
