= Sim Sung-young =

South Korean basketball player

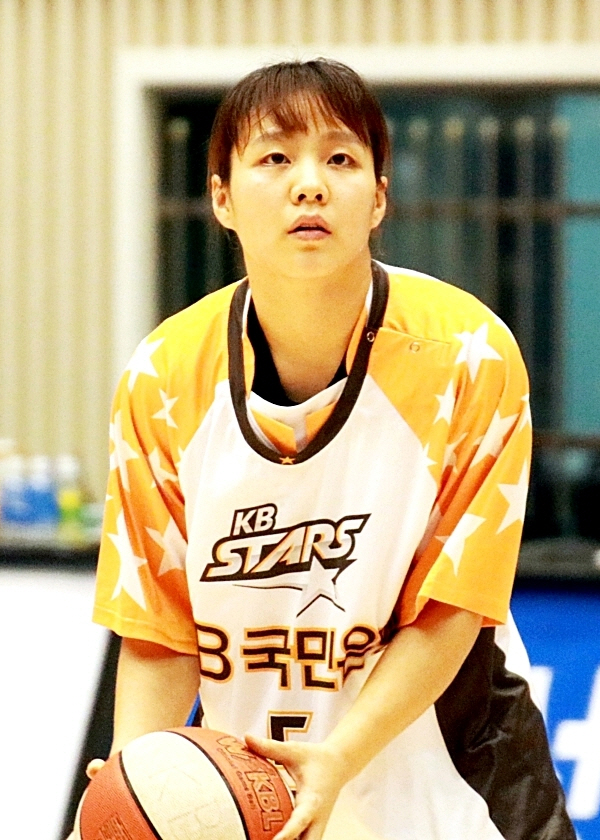

No. 5 – Cheongju KB Stars
- Position: Guard
- League: WKBL

Personal information
- Born: 14 October 1992 (age 34) Gwangju, South Korea
- Listed height: 5 ft 5 in (1.65 m)

Career information
- WNBA draft: 2014: undrafted

Sim Sung-young (born 14 October 1992) is a South Korean basketball player for Cheongju KB Stars and the South Korean national team.

She participated at the 2018 FIBA Women's Basketball World Cup.
