= Moeko Nagaoka =

Japanese basketball player

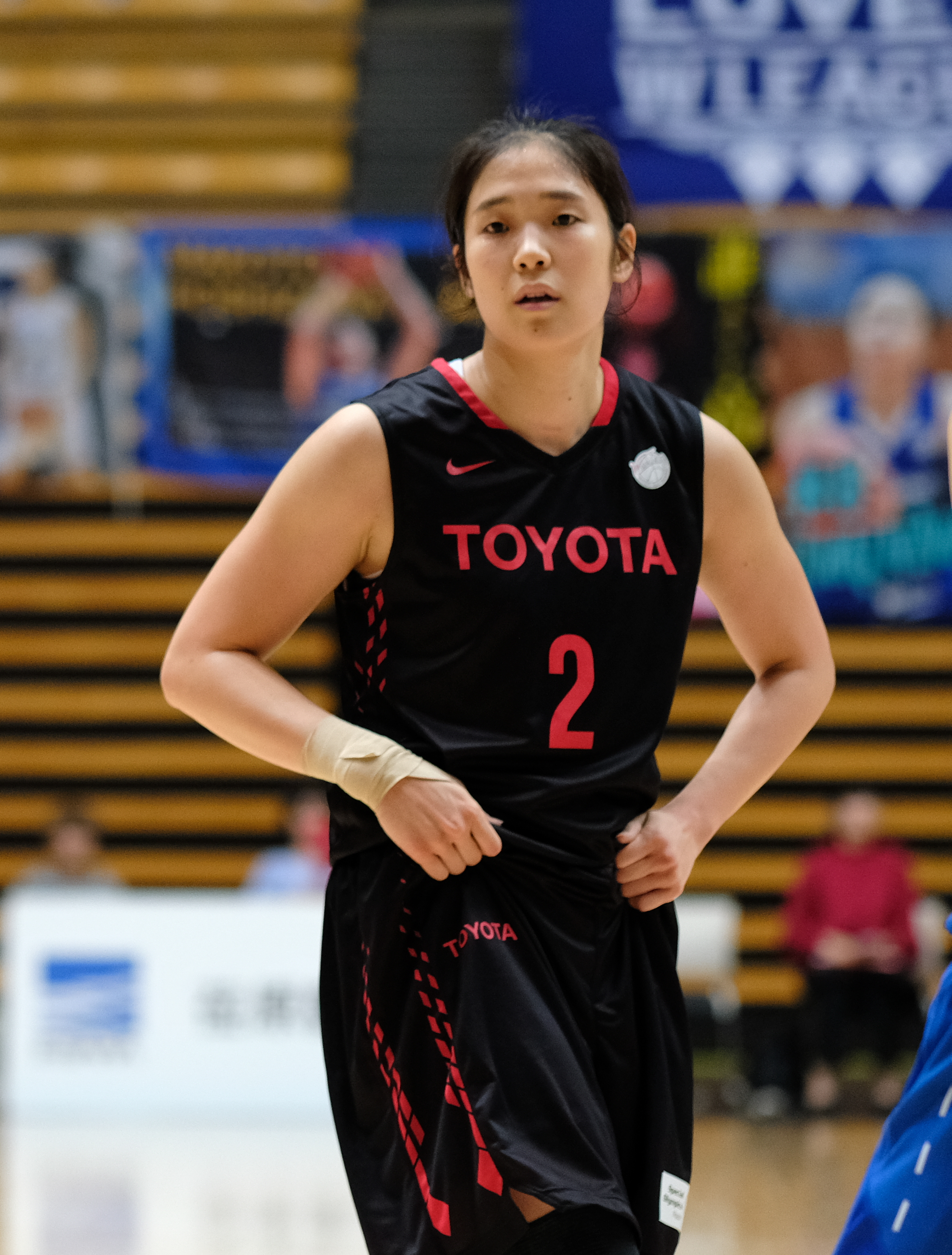
- Nagaoka in 2019

No. 2 – Toyota Antelopes
- Position: Small forward
- League: JBL

Personal information
- Born: 29 December 1993 (age 32) Urakawa, Hokkaido, Japan
- Listed height: 6 ft 0 in (1.83 m)
- Listed weight: 165 lb (75 kg)

Career information
- WNBA draft: 2015: undrafted
Medals
Women's basketball
Representing Japan
Olympic Games
Silver medal – second place	2020 Tokyo	Team
FIBA Asia Under-16 Championship for Women
Silver medal – second place	2009 Pune	Japan U17
FIBA 3x3 Under-18 World Cup
Bronze medal – third place	2011 Rimini	Japan 3x3 U18
FIBA Asia Cup
Gold medal – first place	2017 India
Gold medal – first place	2019 India

Moeko Nagaoka (長岡 萌映子, Nagaoka Moeko; born 29 December 1993) is a Japanese basketball player. She represented Japan in the basketball competition at the 2016 Summer Olympics, and at the 2020 Summer Olympics, winning a silver medal.

== Career ==
She competed at the 2020 FIBA Women's Asian Cup, 2018 FIBA Women's World Cup, and 2017 FIBA Women's Asian Cup.
