= Jillian Harmon =

American-New Zealand basketball player

No. 33 – Famila Basket Schio
- Position: Forward
- League: Serie A1

Personal information
- Born: 3 March 1987 (age 39) New York City, New York
- Listed height: 6 ft 1 in (1.85 m)

Career information
- High school: Lakeridge (Lake Oswego, Oregon)
- College: Stanford (2005–2009)
- WNBA draft: 2009: undrafted
- Playing career: 2009–present

Career history
- 2009–2012: Pool Comense
- 2012–2014: Lavezzini Parma
- 2014–2015: Townsville Fire
- 2015: Oceana Gold Rush
- 2015–2017: Le Mura Lucca
- 2017–2018: Dike Basket Napoli
- 2018–2019: Virtus Eirene Ragusa
- 2019–present: Famila Basket Schio

Career highlights
- WNBL Champion (2015); Serie A1 Champion (2017); First-team All Pac-10 (2009); Pac-10 All-Defensive Team (2009); All-Pac-10 Freshman Team (2006)

Jillian Harmon (born 3 March 1987) is an American-New Zealand professional basketball player.

== Career ==
=== College ===
After four years of high school basketball for Lakeridge High School in Lake Oswego, Oregon, Harmon then played college basketball for the Stanford Cardinal in Stanford, California, participating in NCAA Division I. During her time at Stanford, Harmon reached the Final Four twice.

=== Stanford statistics ===
Legend
GP	Games played	GS	Games started	MPG	Minutes per game
FG%	Field goal percentage	3P%	3-point field goal percentage	FT%	Free throw percentage
RPG	Rebounds per game	APG	Assists per game	SPG	Steals per game
BPG	Blocks per game	PPG	Points per game	**Bold**	Career high

Year	Team	GP	Points	FG%	3P%	FT%	RPG	APG	SPG	BPG	PPG
2005–06	Stanford	34	290	**49.0%**	20.0%	60.2%	**5.5**	2.1	1.4	**0.6**	8.5
2006–07	Stanford	34	262	42.1%	24.0%	60.0%	4.9	2.4	1.0	0.3	7.7
2007–08	Stanford	32	199	47.0%	0.0%	58.4%	4.8	1.6	0.9	0.3	6.2
2008–09	Stanford	**36**	**345**	47.7%	**32.7%**	**67.2%**	4.5	**2.7**	**1.4**	0.5	**9.6**
Career		136	1096	46.4%	25.6%	61.3%	4.9	2.2	1.2	0.4	8.1

=== Europe ===
After her college career, Harmon first signed with Pool Comense for the 2009–10 season of Italy's Serie A1. In 2012, Harmon would make the move to Lavezzini Parma. After a season abroad in Australia and New Zealand, Harmon returned to Italy after signing with Le Mura Lucca. In 2017, Harmon won her first championship with Lucca.

=== Australia ===
Harmon was signed for the 2014–15 WNBL season with the Townsville Fire. Playing alongside the likes of Suzy Batkovic, Micaela Cocks and Cayla George, Harmon helped lead the Fire to their first WNBL championship.

== National team ==
In 2008, Harmon tried out for the New Zealand national team after learning she was eligible because her mother was born in New Zealand. Harmon and former Stanford teammate Clare Bodensteiner were both named to the team shortly before the Olympics. Harmon made her international debut for the Tall Ferns at the 2008 Olympics.

In 2011, Harmon took home the silver medal at the 2011 FIBA Oceania Championship. After taking home the silver, Harmon and the Tall Ferns would then go on to participate in the Olympic Qualifying Tournament in Turkey. After losses to Argentina and the Czech Republic, they failed to qualify.

In 2016, Harmon would once again join the Tall Ferns and compete in the Olympic Qualifying Tournament, with this edition in France. However, they failed to qualify again.
