= Barkha Sonkar =

Indian Women's Basketball player

Personal information
- Nickname: BK
- Nationality: Indian
- Citizenship: India
- Born: 24 December 1996 (age 29) Varanasi, Uttar Pradesh, India
- Education: IMG Academy; Hillsborough Community College, Lindsey Wilson College, Husson University
- Years active: 2016 - present
- Employer: India
- Height: 165 cm (5 ft 5 in)
- Weight: 61 kg (134 lb)

Sport
- Country: India
- Sport: Basketball
- Position: 1
- Club: Hillsborough Hawks
- Team: India
Medal record
Women's basketball
Representing India
South Asian Games
Gold medal – first place	2019 Kathmandu	Team

Barkha Sonkar (24 December 1996) is an Indian women's basketball player. She is a member of India women's national basketball team and represented India in "2017 FIBA Women's Asia Cup Division B"

== Early life and education ==
She was selected for the IMG Reliance scholarship programmes in the US for schooling and training. Studied high school at IMG Academy Bradenton, Florida, and graduated from IMG Academy in 2016, after that went to Hillsborough Community College, played for hawks (National Collegiate Athletic Association) for 2 years.

Currently playing for Lindsey Wilson College, Kentucky

== Championship ==
During the 2017 FIBA Asia Cup held at Sree Kanteerava Stadium, Bengaluru, Barkha played well and India defeated Kazakhstan by 75-73. Barkha has been top 3rd player in the match.
