= Huang Sijing =

Chinese basketball player (born 1996)

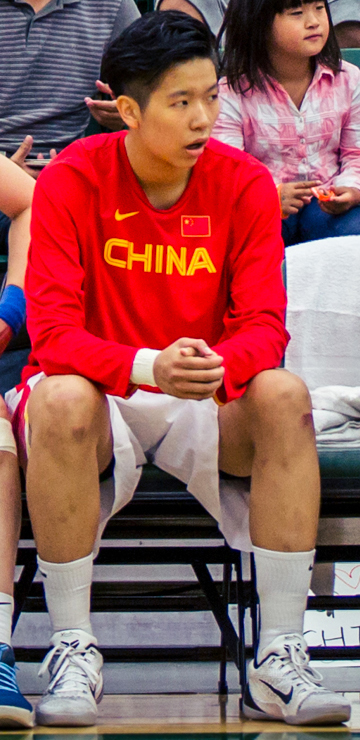
- Huang Sijing in 2016

No. 11 – Guangdong Vermilion Birds
- Position: Power forward
- League: WCBA

Personal information
- Born: 8 January 1996 (age 30) Meizhou, Guangdong, China
- Listed height: 192 cm (6 ft 4 in)
- Listed weight: 80 kg (176 lb)

Career information
- WNBA draft: 2018: undrafted
- Playing career: 2013–present
- Coaching career: 2023–present

Career history

Playing
- 2013–2020: Guangdong Dolphins
- 2020–2023: Inner Mongolia Rural Credit Union
- 2023–present: Guangdong Vermilion Birds

Coaching
- 2023–2024: Guangdong Vermilion Birds (assistant)
- 2024–present: Guangdong Vermilion Birds
Medals
Women's basketball
Representing China
World Cup
Silver medal – second place	2022 Australia
FIBA Asia Cup
Silver medal – second place	2015 Wuhan
Silver medal – second place	2021 Jordan
Bronze medal – third place	2017 Bangalore
Bronze medal – third place	2025 China
Asian Games
Gold medal – first place	2022 Hangzhou	Team
Gold medal – first place	2018 Jakarta	Team

Huang Sijing (simplified Chinese: 黄思静; traditional Chinese: 黃思靜; pinyin: Huáng Sījìng; born 8 January 1996) is a professional Chinese basketball player and coach. She plays for, and coaches, the Guangdong Vermilion Birds team in the WCBA.

In 2013, Huang Sijing began competing in the WCBA (Women's Chinese Basketball Association) league and won a total of 3 WCBA championships during her career.

In 2015, at the age of 19, Sijing was first selected for the Chinese national women's basketball team. She represented the national team in various competitions, including 2 Olympic Games (2016 Rio and 2020 Tokyo), 2 World Cups (2018 and 2022), 2 Asian Cups (2017 and 2021),

== Early life ==
Sijing was born in Meixian District, located in Meizhou City, Guangdong Province on January 8, 1996. Then, she lived with her parents in Dongguan.

In 2006, Huang Sijing entered Guangdong Provincial Sports School and began playing basketball.

In 2010, Huang Sijing joined the Guangdong Provincial Youth Basketball Team.

== Playing career ==
=== Guangdong ===
In 2013, Huang Sijing joined the Guangdong Women's Basketball Team and began competing in the WCBA (Women's Chinese Basketball Association) league.

During the 2013–14 season, Huang Sijing represented the Guangdong Women's Basketball Team in 20 regular-season games, averaging 8.0 minutes per game. She scored an average of 3.9 points, grabbed 1.5 rebounds, and dished out 0.6 assists per game during the regular season. Additionally, she played in 1 postseason game, where she scored 12 points, secured 7 rebounds, and provided 1 assist.

During the 2014–15 season, Huang Sijing represented the Guangdong Women's Basketball Team in 28 regular-season games, averaging 27.1 minutes per game. She averaged 11.1 points, 5.2 rebounds, and 2.0 assists per game during the regular season. In the postseason, she played in 2 games, averaging 24.1 minutes per game, and recorded averages of 13.0 points, 7.0 rebounds, and 2.0 assists. Huang Sijing's impressive performance during that season earned her the Best Newcomer award and the Block category Second Prize.

During the 2015–16 season, Huang Sijing represented the Guangdong Women's Basketball Team in 29 regular-season games, averaging 30.6 minutes per game. She averaged 16.1 points, 7.5 rebounds, and 2.3 assists per game during the regular season. In the postseason, she played in 5 games, averaging 25.2 minutes per game and recording averages of 19.2 points, 6.6 rebounds, and 1.8 assists.

During the 2016–17 season, Huang Sijing represented the Guangdong Women's Basketball Team in 33 regular-season games, averaging 29.6 minutes per game. She averaged 15.6 points, 7.4 rebounds, and 2.1 assists per game during the regular season. In the postseason, she played in 3 games, averaging 30.9 minutes per game and recording averages of 18.7 points, 6.0 rebounds, and 0.7 assists.

During the 2017–18 season, Huang Sijing represented the Guangdong Women's Basketball Team in 3 regular-season games, averaging 12.6 minutes per game. She averaged 5.3 points, 3.3 rebounds, and 1.0 assist per game during the regular season. In the postseason, she played in 7 games, averaging 28.5 minutes per game and recording averages of 15.9 points, 6.0 rebounds, and 1.9 assists.

During the 2018–19 season, Huang Sijing represented the Guangdong Women's Basketball Team in 32 regular-season games, averaging 24.9 minutes per game. She averaged 10.6 points, 7.2 rebounds, and 3.5 assists per game during the regular season. In the postseason, she played in 9 games, averaging 30.7 minutes per game and recording averages of 14.0 points, 7.1 rebounds, and 2.9 assists.

During the 2019–20 season, Huang Sijing represented the Guangdong Women's Basketball Team in 18 regular-season games, averaging 21.0 minutes per game. She averaged 12.0 points, 7.3 rebounds, and 3.5 assists per game during the regular season.

She led the Guangdong Vermilion Birds to a championship in the 2024-2025 season.

=== Inner Mongolia ===
During the 2020–21 season, Huang Sijing represented the Inner Mongolia Women's Basketball Team in 16 regular-season games, averaging 17.2 minutes per game. She averaged 7.6 points, 5.0 rebounds, and 2.3 assists per game during the regular season. In the postseason, she played in 4 games, averaging 29.7 minutes per game and recording averages of 17.0 points, 8.0 rebounds, and 4.3 assists.

During the 2021–22 season, Huang Sijing represented the Inner Mongolia Women's Basketball Team in 16 regular-season games, averaging 15.8 minutes per game. She averaged 10.6 points, 5.3 rebounds, and 2.9 assists per game during the regular season. In the postseason, she played in 4 games, averaging 18.8 minutes per game and recording averages of 11.5 points, 8.5 rebounds, and 4.0 assists.

During the 2022–23 season, Huang Sijing represented the Inner Mongolia Women's Basketball Team in 10 regular-season games, averaging 17 minutes per game. She averaged 10.6 points, 5.2 rebounds, and 3.6 assists per game during the regular season. In the postseason, she played in 7 games, averaging 28.4 minutes per game and recording averages of 17 points, 9.9 rebounds, and 3.0 assists.

=== National team ===
On April 24, 2015, Huang Sijing was first selected to represent the Chinese national women's basketball team. Sijing helped the Chinese women's basketball team win all three games in Four Nations Women's Basketball Tournament that year.

Sijing and the Chinese women's national basketball team competed in the Rio Olympics in 2016. In the end, they did not make it to the top 8.

On July 30, in the 2017 Women's Basketball Asia Cup third-place playoff, Huang Sijing scored 16 points, grabbed 6 rebounds, dished out 5 assists, and made 4 steals, helping the Chinese team defeat the South Korean women's basketball team with a score of 75–51 and won the third-place.

On September 1, in the women's basketball final of the 2018 Jakarta Palembang, Huang Sijing helped the Chinese team secure the championship by defeating the unified North and South Korean team with a score of 71–65.

On October 1, in the 2022 Women's Basketball World Cup final, Sijing represented the Chinese team. In the end, China lost to the United States with a score of 61–83, and secured the World Cup runner-up.

== Coaching career ==
Huang Sijing became the head coach of the Guangdong Vermilion Birds during the 2024-25 season, winning the WCBA championship as both player and coach.
