= 2020 FIBA Women's Olympic Qualifying Tournaments squads =

This article displays the squads of the teams that competed in 2020 FIBA Women's Olympic Qualifying Tournaments. Each team consists of 12 players.

== Ostend ==
=== Belgium ===
Belgium women's national basketball team – 2020 Olympic Qualifying Tournament roster
Players
Coaches

Pos.	No.	Name	Age – Date of birth	Height	Club	Ctr.
SG	5	Kim Mestdagh	29 – 12 March 1990	1.79 m (5 ft 10 in)	Flammes Carolo	(France)
SF	6	Antonia Delaere	25 – 1 August 1994	1.80 m (5 ft 11 in)	Nantes Rezé	(France)
G	9	Marjorie Carpréaux	32 – 17 September 1987	1.61 m (5 ft 3 in)	Mechelen	(Belgium)
SF	10	Laure Resimont	22 – 29 January 1998	1.85 m (6 ft 1 in)	Tarbes Gespe Bigorre	(France)
PF	11	Emma Meesseman	26 – 13 May 1993	1.92 m (6 ft 4 in)	UMMC Ekaterinburg	(Russia)
C	12	Ann Wauters	39 – 12 October 1980	1.95 m (6 ft 5 in)	Kayseri Basketbol	(Turkey)
C	13	Kyara Linskens	23 – 13 November 1996	1.93 m (6 ft 4 in)	BC Enisey	(Russia)
F	22	Hanne Mestdagh	26 – 19 April 1993	1.78 m (5 ft 10 in)	Namur-Capitale	(Belgium)
F	32	Heleen Nauwelaers	23 – 14 March 1996	1.80 m (5 ft 11 in)	CB Bembibre	(Spain)
PF	34	Billie Massey	19 – 21 March 2000	1.88 m (6 ft 2 in)	Basket Hema SKW	(Belgium)
PF	42	Jana Raman	28 – 15 February 1991	1.87 m (6 ft 2 in)	Valencia Basket	(Spain)
PG	55	Julie Allemand	23 – 7 July 1996	1.68 m (5 ft 6 in)	Lyon ASVEL	(France)

Head coach

- (Belgium) Philip Mestdagh

Assistant coach(es)

- (Belgium) Sven Van Camp
- (Belgium) Pierre Cornia

Legend

- Club – describes last
  club before the tournament
- Age – describes age
  on 6 February 2020

Source
fiba.com

=== Canada ===
Canada women's national basketball team – 2020 Olympic Qualifying Tournament roster
Players
Coaches

Pos.	No.	Name	Age – Date of birth	Height	Club	Ctr.
G	4	Sami Hill	25 – 22 November 1994	1.78 m (5 ft 10 in)	XCYDE Angels Nördlingen	(Germany)
G	5	Kia Nurse	23 – 22 February 1996	1.82 m (6 ft 0 in)	New York Liberty	(United States)
G	6	Bridget Carleton	22 – 22 May 1997	1.85 m (6 ft 1 in)	Minnesota Lynx	(United States)
F	7	Nayo Raincock-Ekunwe	27 – 15 September 1992	1.88 m (6 ft 2 in)	New York Liberty	(United States)
G	8	Kim Gaucher	35 – 7 May 1984	1.86 m (6 ft 1 in)	USO Mondeville	(France)
F	9	Miranda Ayim	31 – 6 May 1988	1.91 m (6 ft 3 in)	Landes	(France)
G	10	Miah-Marie Langlois	28 – 21 September 1991	1.72 m (5 ft 8 in)	Dynamo Novosibirsk	(Russia)
C	11	Natalie Achonwa	27 – 21 November 1992	1.91 m (6 ft 3 in)	Indiana Fever	(United States)
G	12	Jamie Scott	25 – 9 August 1994	1.78 m (5 ft 10 in)	Dynamo Novosibirsk	(Russia)
C	14	Kayla Alexander	29 – 5 January 1991	1.93 m (6 ft 4 in)	Chicago Sky	(United States)
PG	21	Shaina Pellington	20 – 1 June 1999	1.70 m (5 ft 7 in)	Arizona Wildcats	(United States)
F	23	Laeticia Amihere	18 – 10 July 2001	1.86 m (6 ft 1 in)	South Carolina Gamecocks	(United States)

Head coach

- (Canada) Lisa Thomaidis

Assistant coach(es)

- (Canada) Steve Baur
- (Canada) Carly Clarke

Legend

- Club – describes last
  club before the tournament
- Age – describes age
  on 6 February 2020

Source
fiba.com

=== Japan ===
Japan women's national basketball team – 2020 Olympic Qualifying Tournament roster roster
Players
Coaches

Pos.	No.	Name	Age – Date of birth	Height	Club	Ctr.
SF	0	Moeko Nagaoka	26 – 29 December 1993	1.82 m (6 ft 0 in)	Toyota Antelopes	(Japan)
C	6	Yuka Mamiya	29 – 3 April 1990	1.85 m (6 ft 1 in)	JX-Eneos Sunflowers	(Japan)
PF	8	Maki Takada	30 – 23 August 1989	1.83 m (6 ft 0 in)	Denso Iris	(Japan)
F/C	10	Ramu Tokashiki	28 – 11 June 1991	1.93 m (6 ft 4 in)	JX-Eneos Sunflowers	(Japan)
PG	12	Asami Yoshida	32 – 9 October 1987	1.65 m (5 ft 5 in)	JX-Eneos Sunflowers	(Japan)
PG	13	Rui Machida	26 – 8 March 1993	1.62 m (5 ft 4 in)	Fujitsu Red Wave	(Japan)
SG	14	Sanae Motokawa	27 – 2 April 1992	1.76 m (5 ft 9 in)	Chanson V-Magic	(Japan)
PG	15	Nako Motohashi	26 – 10 October 1993	1.65 m (5 ft 5 in)	Haneda Vickies	(Japan)
SG	27	Saki Hayashi	24 – 16 March 1995	1.73 m (5 ft 8 in)	JX-Eneos Sunflowers	(Japan)
SF	30	Evelyn Mawuli	24 – 2 June 1995	1.80 m (5 ft 11 in)	Toyota Antelopes	(Japan)
SF	81	Kiho Miyashita	21 – 6 October 1998	1.79 m (5 ft 10 in)	Aisin AW Wings	(Japan)
SG	88	Himawari Akaho	21 – 28 August 1998	1.85 m (6 ft 1 in)	Denso Iris	(Japan)

Head coach

- (United States) Tom Hovasse

Legend

- Club – describes last
  club before the tournament
- Age – describes age
  on 6 February 2020

Source
fiba.com

=== Sweden ===
Sweden women's national basketball team – 2020 Olympic Qualifying Tournament roster
Players
Coaches

Pos.	No.	Name	Age – Date of birth	Height	Club	Ctr.
PF	1	Farhiya Abdi	27 – 31 May 1992	1.88 m (6 ft 2 in)	Galatasaray	(Turkey)
PF	4	Nathalie Fontaine	26 – 3 October 1993	1.88 m (6 ft 2 in)	Tarbes Gespe Bigorre	(France)
F	5	Kalis Loyd	30 – 5 April 1989	1.84 m (6 ft 0 in)	Flammes Carolo	(France)
SG	6	Frida Eldebrink	32 – 4 January 1988	1.75 m (5 ft 9 in)	Botaş SK	(Turkey)
PG	7	Klara Lundquist	20 – 28 August 1999	1.73 m (5 ft 8 in)	Telge Basket	(Sweden)
F	8	Ellen Nyström	26 – 15 September 1993	1.85 m (6 ft 1 in)	IDK Gipuzkoa	(Spain)
G	9	Elin Eldebrink	32 – 4 January 1988	1.70 m (5 ft 7 in)	CB Avenida	(Spain)
PF	11	Regan Magarity	23 – 30 April 1996	1.90 m (6 ft 3 in)	Hatay BB	(Turkey)
G	13	Binta Drammeh	27 – 21 May 1992	1.81 m (5 ft 11 in)	Le Mura Lucca	(Italy)
C	14	Louice Halvarsson	31 – 15 January 1989	1.91 m (6 ft 3 in)	Tarbes Gespe Bigorre	(France)
PF	17	Amanda Zahui B.	26 – 8 September 1993	1.96 m (6 ft 5 in)	New York Liberty	(United States)
C	24	Paulina Hersler	25 – 16 May 1994	1.90 m (6 ft 3 in)	ŽKK Celje	(Slovenia)

Head coach

- (Italy) Marco Crespi

Assistant coaches

- (Sweden) Viktor Bengtsson
- (Sweden) Mats Levin

Legend

- Club – describes last
  club before the tournament
- Age – describes age
  on 6 February 2020

Source
fiba.com

== Bourges ==
=== Australia ===
Australia women's national basketball team – 2020 Olympic Qualifying Tournament roster
Players
Coaches

Pos.	No.	Name	Age – Date of birth	Height	Club
G	1	Lauren Nicholson	26 – 26 March 1993	1.82 m (6 ft 0 in)	Adelaide Lightning	(Australia)
G	5	Leilani Mitchell	34 – 15 June 1985	1.65 m (5 ft 5 in)	Phoenix Mercury	(United States)
G/F	6	Stephanie Talbot	25 – 15 June 1994	1.88 m (6 ft 2 in)	Minnesota Lynx	(United States)
C	8	Liz Cambage	28 – 18 August 1991	2.03 m (6 ft 8 in)	Las Vegas Aces	(United States)
G	9	Rebecca Allen	27 – 6 November 1992	1.86 m (6 ft 1 in)	New York Liberty	(United States)
G	10	Katie Ebzery	29 – 1 August 1990	1.78 m (5 ft 10 in)	Perth Lynx	(Australia)
F	11	Alanna Smith	23 – 10 September 1996	1.91 m (6 ft 3 in)	Phoenix Mercury	(United States)
PF	12	Sara Blicavs	26 – 15 February 1993	1.89 m (6 ft 2 in)	Southside Flyers	(Australia)
F	13	Ezi Magbegor	20 – 13 August 1999	1.93 m (6 ft 4 in)	Melbourne Boomers	(Australia)
C	14	Marianna Tolo	30 – 2 July 1989	1.96 m (6 ft 5 in)	Canberra Capitals	(Australia)
C	15	Cayla George	30 – 1 May 1989	1.94 m (6 ft 4 in)	Melbourne Boomers	(Australia)
G	23	Tessa Lavey	26 – 29 March 1993	1.72 m (5 ft 8 in)	Bendigo Spirit	(Australia)

Head coach

- (Australia) Sandy Brondello

Assistant coach(es)

- (Australia) Cheryl Chambers
- (Australia) Paul Goriss
- (Australia) Chris Lucas

Legend

- Club – describes last
  club before the tournament
- Age – describes age
  on 6 February 2020

Source
fiba.com

=== Brazil ===
Brazil women's national basketball team – 2020 Olympic Qualifying Tournament roster
Players
Coaches

Pos.	No.	Name	Age – Date of birth	Height	Club	Ctr.
G	2	Lays da Silva	21 – 11 September 1998	1.65 m (5 ft 5 in)	Campinas	(Brazil)
F	3	Isabela Ramona	26 – 23 January 1994	1.80 m (5 ft 11 in)	Sampaio Basquete	(Brazil)
F	5	Rapha Monteiro	25 – 28 January 1995	1.81 m (5 ft 11 in)	Sampaio Basquete	(Brazil)
SG	7	Patty Teixeira	29 – 28 September 1990	1.75 m (5 ft 9 in)	Campinas	(Brazil)
G	8	Tainá Paixão	28 – 29 November 1991	1.73 m (5 ft 8 in)	Sampaio Basquete	(Brazil)
F	10	Tatiane Pacheco	29 – 16 October 1990	1.81 m (5 ft 11 in)	Sampaio Basquete	(Brazil)
F	12	Damiris Dantas	27 – 17 November 1992	1.93 m (6 ft 4 in)	Minnesota Lynx	(United States)
C	14	Érika de Souza	37 – 9 March 1982	1.96 m (6 ft 5 in)	IDK Gipuzkoa	(Spain)
C	16	M. Carolina Oliveira	25 – 7 November 1994	1.90 m (6 ft 3 in)	Pró Esporte Sorocaba	(Brazil)
PG	18	Débora Costa	28 – 12 August 1991	1.65 m (5 ft 5 in)	Sesi Araraquara	(Brazil)
PG	23	Alana Gonçalo	25 – 23 September 1994	1.66 m (5 ft 5 in)	Ituano FC	(Brazil)
PF	97	Mari Dias	22 – 12 October 1997	1.86 m (6 ft 1 in)	Ituano FC	(Brazil)

Head coach

- (Brazil) José Neto

Assistant coach(es)

- (Brazil) João Camargo
- (Brazil) Virgil Lopez

Legend

- Club – describes last
  club before the tournament
- Age – describes age
  on 6 February 2020

Source
fiba.com

=== France ===
France women's national basketball team – 2020 Olympic Qualifying Tournament roster
Players
Coaches

Pos.	No.	Name	Age – Date of birth	Height	Club	Ctr.
PG	0	Olivia Époupa	25 – 30 April 1994	1.64 m (5 ft 5 in)	Canberra Capitals	(Australia)
PG	4	Marine Fauthoux	19 – 23 January 2001	1.76 m (5 ft 9 in)	Tarbes GB	(France)
PF	5	Endéné Miyem	31 – 15 May 1988	1.88 m (6 ft 2 in)	Flammes Carolo	(France)
PF	6	Alexia Chartereau	21 – 5 September 1998	1.90 m (6 ft 3 in)	Bourges	(France)
C	7	Sandrine Gruda	32 – 25 June 1987	1.93 m (6 ft 4 in)	PF Schio	(Italy)
C	8	Héléna Ciak	30 – 15 December 1989	1.97 m (6 ft 6 in)	Lyon ASVEL	(France)
SG	10	Sarah Michel	31 – 10 January 1989	1.80 m (5 ft 11 in)	Bourges	(France)
SF	11	Valériane Vukosavljević	25 – 29 April 1994	1.84 m (6 ft 0 in)	USK Praha	(Czech Republic)
C	12	Iliana Rupert	18 – 12 July 2001	1.94 m (6 ft 4 in)	Bourges	(France)
SG	14	Bria Hartley	27 – 30 September 1992	1.76 m (5 ft 9 in)	New York Liberty	(United States)
SG	17	Marine Johannès	25 – 21 January 1995	1.77 m (5 ft 10 in)	New York Liberty	(United States)
SF	93	Diandra Tchatchouang	28 – 14 June 1991	1.89 m (6 ft 2 in)	BLMA	(France)

Head coach

- (France) Valérie Garnier

Assistant coach(es)

- (France) Grégory Halin
- (France) Olivier Lafargue

Legend

- Club – describes last
  club before the tournament
- Age – describes age
  on 6 February 2020

Source
fiba.com

=== Puerto Rico ===
Puerto Rico women's national basketball team – 2020 Olympic Qualifying Tournament roster
Players
Coaches

Pos.	No.	Name	Age – Date of birth	Height	Club	Ctr.
PG	0	Jennifer O'Neill	29 – April 19, 1990	5 ft 5 in (1.65 m)	Artego Bydgoszcz	(Poland)
F	2	Tayra Meléndez	26 – October 29, 1993	5 ft 7 in (1.7 m)	ŽKK Šibenik	(Croatia)
PG	5	Pamela Rosado	33 – April 30, 1986	5 ft 5 in (1.65 m)	Atenienses de Manati	(Puerto Rico)
SG	9	Ali Gibson	26 – March 27, 1993	6 ft 3 in (1.91 m)	Gigantes de Carolina	(Puerto Rico)
PF	10	Paola Crespo	23 – June 13, 1996	6 ft 1 in (1.85 m)	Cafetaleras de Yauco	(Puerto Rico)
PF	11	Sofía Roma	23 – November 21, 1996	6 ft 2 in (1.88 m)	Duke Blue Devils	(United States)
G	12	Dayshalee Salamán	29 – August 17, 1990	5 ft 5 in (1.65 m)	IK Eos	(Sweden)
G	20	Deanna Kuzmanic	23 – September 11, 1996	5 ft 9 in (1.75 m)	Canterbury Wildcats	(New Zealand)
G	22	Daneishka Canales	22 – June 12, 1997	5 ft 11 in (1.8 m)	Gigantes de Carolina	(Puerto Rico)
PF	23	Yolanda Jones	35 – June 3, 1984	5 ft 9 in (1.75 m)	Gigantes de Carolina	(Puerto Rico)
SG	24	Jazmon Gwathmey	27 – January 24, 1993	6 ft 2 in (1.88 m)	San Martino di Lupari	(Italy)
PF	25	Isalys Quiñones	22 – October 23, 1997	6 ft 3 in (1.91 m)	Dartmouth Big Green	(United States)

Head coach

- (Puerto Rico) Jerry Batista

Legend

- (C) Team captain
- Club – describes last
  club before the tournament
- Age – describes age
  on 6 February 2020

Source
fiba.com

== Belgrade – Group A ==
=== Mozambique ===
Mozambique women's national basketball team – 2020 Olympic Qualifying Tournament roster
Players
Coaches

Pos.	No.	Name	Age – Date of birth	Height	Club	Ctr.
PG	5	Delma Zita	21 – 27 March 1998	1.72 m (5 ft 8 in)	Clube Ferroviário	(Mozambique)
F	6	Ingvild Mucauro	27 – 12 September 1992	1.74 m (5 ft 9 in)	Clube Ferroviário	(Mozambique)
SG	7	Anabela Cossa	33 – 7 April 1986	1.72 m (5 ft 8 in)	Clube Ferroviário	(Mozambique)
C	11	Leia Dongue	28 – 24 May 1991	1.88 m (6 ft 2 in)	Uni Girona CB	(Spain)
F	12	Eleuteria Lhavanguane	22 – 12 November 1997	1.80 m (5 ft 11 in)	Clube Ferroviário	(Mozambique)
F	13	Elizabeth Pereira	28 – 8 November 1991	1.70 m (5 ft 7 in)	CD Costa do Sol	(Mozambique)
PF	14	Odélia Mafanela	30 – 14 April 1989	1.81 m (5 ft 11 in)	Clube Ferroviário	(Mozambique)
C	15	Deolinda Gimo	32 – 15 August 1987	1.90 m (6 ft 3 in)	Clube Ferroviário	(Mozambique)
C	16	Tamara Seda	25 – 18 June 1994	1.92 m (6 ft 4 in)	Araski AES	(Spain)
C	18	Nilza Chiziane	27 – 27 February 1992	1.88 m (6 ft 2 in)	Carnide Clube	(Portugal)
	20	Dulce Luis Mabjaia	31 – 5 November 1988	1.65 m (5 ft 5 in)	Clube Ferroviário	(Mozambique)
PG	22	Ornélia Mutombene	29 – 24 October 1990	1.68 m (5 ft 6 in)	Clube Ferroviário	(Mozambique)

Head coach

- (Mozambique) Leonel Manhique

Assistant coach(es)

- (Mozambique) Deolinda Ngulela

Legend

- Club – describes last
  club before the tournament
- Age – describes age
  on 6 February 2020

Source
fiba.com

=== Nigeria ===
Nigeria women's national basketball team – 2020 Olympic Qualifying Tournament roster
Players
Coaches

Pos.	No.	Name	Age – Date of birth	Height	Club	Ctr.
G	4	Elizabeth Balogun	19 – 9 September 2000	1.85 m (6 ft 1 in)	Louisville Cardinals	(United States)
G	7	Sarah Ogoke	29 – 25 June 1990	1.75 m (5 ft 9 in)	Clube Ferroviário	(Mozambique)
F	9	Aisha Mohammed	34 – 21 October 1985	1.93 m (6 ft 4 in)	CD Zamarat	(Spain)
G	10	Promise Amukamara	26 – 22 June 1993	1.70 m (5 ft 7 in)	Charnay	(France)
F	11	Adaora Elonu	29 – 28 April 1990	1.83 m (6 ft 0 in)	Uni Girona CB	(Spain)
C	12	Elo Edeferioka	26 – 10 April 1993	1.90 m (6 ft 3 in)	CB Vigo	(Spain)
C	13	Evelyn Akhator	25 – 3 February 1995	1.80 m (5 ft 11 in)	Flammes Carolo	(France)
F	21	Atonye Nyingifa	29 – 8 December 1990	1.83 m (6 ft 0 in)	Porta XI Ensino	(Spain)
G	23	Ezinne Kalu	27 – 26 June 1992	1.73 m (5 ft 8 in)	Landerneau Bretagne	(France)
F	24	Sarah Imovbioh	27 – 24 May 1992	1.88 m (6 ft 2 in)	Namur-Capitale	(Belgium)
C	25	Victoria Macaulay	29 – 7 August 1990	1.93 m (6 ft 4 in)	Galatasaray	(Turkey)
SF	52	Ify Ibekwe	30 – 5 October 1989	1.88 m (6 ft 2 in)	Ragusa	(Italy)

Head coach

- (United States) Otis Hughley Jr.

Assistant coach(es)

- (Nigeria) Peter Ahmedu
- (Nigeria) Shola Ogunade Shomala

Legend

- Club – describes last
  club before the tournament
- Age – describes age
  on 6 February 2020

Source
fiba.com

=== Serbia ===
Serbia women's national basketball team – 2020 Olympic Qualifying Tournament roster
Players
Coaches

Pos.	No.	Name	Age – Date of birth	Height	Club	Ctr.
PG	3	Maja Miljković	31 – 11 April 1988	1.75 m (5 ft 9 in)	CSM Satu Mare	(Romania)
SF	5	Sonja Vasić	30 – 18 February 1989	1.89 m (6 ft 2 in)	Uni Girona CB	(Spain)
SG	6	Saša Čađo	30 – 13 July 1989	1.78 m (5 ft 10 in)	İzmit Belediyespor	(Turkey)
SG	8	Nevena Jovanović	29 – 30 June 1990	1.79 m (5 ft 10 in)	Ślęza Wrocław	(Poland)
PF	9	Jelena Brooks	30 – 28 April 1989	1.90 m (6 ft 3 in)	Uniqa Sopron	(Hungary)
G	10	Dajana Butulija	33 – 23 February 1986	1.75 m (5 ft 9 in)	Lublin	(Poland)
PF	11	Aleksandra Crvendakić	23 – 17 March 1996	1.87 m (6 ft 2 in)	Uniqa Sopron	(Hungary)
C	13	Nikolina Milić	25 – 12 April 1994	1.89 m (6 ft 2 in)	Gernika	(Spain)
C	14	Dragana Stanković	25 – 18 January 1995	1.95 m (6 ft 5 in)	Galatasaray	(Turkey)
SG	23	Ana Dabović	30 – 18 August 1989	1.83 m (6 ft 0 in)	Bourges	(France)
PF	24	Maja Škorić	30 – 11 October 1989	1.84 m (6 ft 0 in)	DVTK Miskolc	(Hungary)
C	33	Tina Jovanović	29 – 12 January 1991	1.90 m (6 ft 3 in)	Uniqa Sopron	(Hungary)

Head coach

- (Serbia) Marina Maljković

Assistant coach(es)

- (Serbia) Miloš Pađen
- (Serbia) Vladimir Vuksanović

Legend

- Club – describes last
  club before the tournament
- Age – describes age
  on 6 February 2020

Source
fiba.com

=== United States ===
United States women's national basketball team – 2020 Olympic Qualifying Tournament roster
Players
Coaches

Pos.	No.	Name	Age – Date of birth	Height	Club	Ctr.
G	4	Jewell Loyd	26 – 5 October 1993	1.78 m (5 ft 10 in)	Seattle Storm	(United States)
G	6	Sue Bird	39 – 16 October 1980	1.75 m (5 ft 9 in)	Seattle Storm	(United States)
F	9	A'ja Wilson	23 – 8 August 1996	1.96 m (6 ft 5 in)	Las Vegas Aces	(United States)
F/C	10	Breanna Stewart	25 – 27 August 1994	1.93 m (6 ft 4 in)	Seattle Storm	(United States)
C	13	Sylvia Fowles	34 – 6 October 1985	1.98 m (6 ft 6 in)	Minnesota Lynx	(United States)
C	15	Brittney Griner	29 – 18 October 1990	2.06 m (6 ft 9 in)	Phoenix Mercury	(United States)
F	16	Nneka Ogwumike	29 – 2 July 1990	1.88 m (6 ft 2 in)	Los Angeles Sparks	(United States)
G	17	Skylar Diggins-Smith	29 – 2 August 1990	1.75 m (5 ft 9 in)	Dallas Wings	(United States)
G	18	Chelsea Gray	27 – 8 October 1992	1.80 m (5 ft 11 in)	Los Angeles Sparks	(United States)
G/F	33	Katie Lou Samuelson	22 – 13 June 1997	1.91 m (6 ft 3 in)	Chicago Sky	(United States)
G	42	Tiffany Mitchell	25 – 23 September 1994	1.75 m (5 ft 9 in)	Indiana Fever	(United States)
G	52	Ariel Atkins	23 – 30 July 1996	1.55 m (5 ft 1 in)	Washington Mystics	(United States)

Head coach

- (United States) Dawn Staley

Assistant coach(es)

- (United States) Dan Hughes

Legend

- Club – describes last
  club before the tournament
- Age – describes age
  on 6 February 2020

== Belgrade – Group B ==
=== China ===
China women's national basketball team – 2020 Olympic Qualifying Tournament roster
Players
Coaches

Pos.	No.	Name	Age – Date of birth	Height	Club	Ctr.
G	3	Yang Liwei	25 – 2 January 1995	1.76 m (5 ft 9 in)	Guangdong Vermilion Birds	(China)
G	4	Li Yuan	19 – 29 May 2000	1.70 m (5 ft 7 in)	Shandong Six Stars	(China)
G	5	Wang Siyu	24 – 16 October 1995	1.80 m (5 ft 11 in)	Xinjiang Magic Deer	(China)
G	6	Wu Tongtong	25 – 27 June 1994	1.76 m (5 ft 9 in)	Shanxi Flame	(China)
SG	7	Shao Ting	30 – 10 December 1989	1.84 m (6 ft 0 in)	Beijing Great Wall	(China)
SG	9	Li Meng	25 – 2 January 1995	1.83 m (6 ft 0 in)	Beijing Great Wall	(China)
PF	11	Huang Sijing	23 – 1 August 1996	1.90 m (6 ft 3 in)	Guangdong Vermilion Birds	(China)
PF	12	Gao Song	27 – 16 April 1992	1.90 m (6 ft 3 in)	Beijing Great Wall	(China)
C	13	Sun Mengran	27 – 16 July 1992	1.97 m (6 ft 6 in)	Bayi Kylin	(China)
C	14	Li Yueru	20 – 28 March 1999	2.01 m (6 ft 7 in)	Guangdong Vermilion Birds	(China)
C	15	Han Xu	20 – 31 October 1999	2.06 m (6 ft 9 in)	New York Liberty	(United States)
F	17	Zhang Ru	20 – 2 September 1999	1.85 m (6 ft 1 in)	Henan Phoenix	(China)

Head coach

- (China) Xu Limin

Assistant coach(es)

- (China) Jia Nan
- (China) Zheng Wei

Legend

- Club – describes last
  club before the tournament
- Age – describes age
  on 6 February 2020

Source
fiba.com

=== Great Britain ===
Great Britain women's national basketball team – 2020 Olympic Qualifying Tournament roster
Players
Coaches

Pos.	No.	Name	Age – Date of birth	Height	Club	Ctr.
F	1	Chantel Charles	25 – 27 February 1994	1.78 m (5 ft 10 in)	Clarinos San Cristobal	(Spain)
G	3	Nicolette Fong Lyew Quee	27 – 14 April 1992	1.65 m (5 ft 5 in)	Durham Palatinates	(United Kingdom)
G	4	Georgia Jones	29 – 3 April 1990	1.72 m (5 ft 8 in)	Manchester Mystics	(United Kingdom)
F	5	Cheridene Green	24 – 19 September 1995	1.90 m (6 ft 3 in)	Gorzów Wielkopolski	(Poland)
G	7	Rachael Vanderwal	36 – 27 June 1983	1.76 m (5 ft 9 in)	Gernika KESB	(Spain)
SF	8	Chantelle Handy	32 – 16 June 1987	1.88 m (6 ft 2 in)	BC Castors Braine	(Belgium)
C	9	Hannah Shaw	29 – 22 September 1990	1.92 m (6 ft 4 in)	Sarcedo	(Italy)
SG	13	Johannah Leedham	32 – 5 December 1987	1.76 m (5 ft 9 in)	OGM Ormanspor	(Turkey)
C	14	Temi Fagbenle	27 – 8 September 1992	1.93 m (6 ft 4 in)	Minnesota Lynx	(United States)
F	15	Janice Monakana	24 – 6 August 1995	1.82 m (6 ft 0 in)	Sevenoaks Suns	(United Kingdom)
C	31	Kristine Anigwe	22 – 31 March 1997	1.93 m (6 ft 4 in)	Dallas Wings	(United States)
SG	44	Karlie Samuelson	24 – 10 May 1995	1.83 m (6 ft 0 in)	Dallas Wings	(United States)

Head coach

- (Spain) José Buceta

Assistant coaches

- (United Kingdom) Vanessa Ellis
- (Spain) Susana García

Legend

- Club – describes last
  club before the tournament
- Age – describes age
  on 6 February 2020

Source
fiba.com

=== South Korea ===
South Korea women's national basketball team – 2020 Olympic Qualifying Tournament roster
Players
Coaches

Pos.	No.	Name	Age – Date of birth	Height	Club	Ctr.
F	1	Go Ah-ra	31 – 23 September 1988	1.78 m (5 ft 10 in)	KEB HANAbank	(South Korea)
G	3	Kang Lee-seul	25 – 5 April 1994	1.80 m (5 ft 11 in)	KEB HANAbank	(South Korea)
G	5	Park Hye-jin	29 – 22 July 1990	1.78 m (5 ft 10 in)	Woori Bank Wibee	(South Korea)
F	7	Kang A-jeong	30 – 25 July 1989	1.80 m (5 ft 11 in)	KB Stars	(South Korea)
F	8	Kim Min-jeong	25 – 3 May 1994	1.82 m (6 ft 0 in)	KB Stars	(South Korea)
F	9	Sim Sung-young	27 – 14 October 1992	1.65 m (5 ft 5 in)	KB Stars	(South Korea)
F	10	Kim Dan-bi	29 – 27 February 1990	1.80 m (5 ft 11 in)	Shinhan Bank S-Birds	(South Korea)
C	11	Bae Hye-yoon	30 – 10 June 1989	1.82 m (6 ft 0 in)	Shinhan Bank S-Birds	(South Korea)
F	13	Kim Jung-eun	32 – 7 September 1987	1.80 m (5 ft 11 in)	Woori Bank Wibee	(South Korea)
C	19	Park Ji-su	21 – 6 December 1998	1.98 m (6 ft 6 in)	KB Stars	(South Korea)
F	22	Ku Seul	25 – 8 March 1994	1.83 m (6 ft 0 in)	BNK Sum	(South Korea)
F	35	Kim Han-byul	33 – 21 November 1986	1.78 m (5 ft 10 in)	Samsung Blueminx	(South Korea)

Head coach

- (South Korea) Lee Moon-kyu

Assistant coach(es)

- (South Korea) Ha Sook-rye

Legend

- Club – describes last
  club before the tournament
- Age – describes age
  on 6 February 2020

=== Spain ===
Spain women's national basketball team – 2020 Olympic Qualifying Tournament roster
Players
Coaches
}

Pos.	No.	Name	Age – Date of birth	Height	Club
PF	4	Laura Nicholls	30 – 26 February 1989	1.90 m (6 ft 3 in)	Fenerbahçe	(Turkey)
PG	5	Cristina Ouviña	29 – 18 September 1990	1.73 m (5 ft 8 in)	Tango Bourges Basket	(France)
G	6	Sílvia Domínguez	33 – 31 January 1987	1.65 m (5 ft 5 in)	Perfumerías Avenida	(Spain)
PG	7	Alba Torrens	30 – 30 August 1989	1.91 m (6 ft 3 in)	UMMC Ekaterinburg	(Russia)
PG	9	Laia Palau	40 – 10 September 1979	1.78 m (5 ft 10 in)	Uni Girona CB	(Spain)
PG	10	Marta Xargay	29 – 20 December 1990	1.80 m (5 ft 11 in)	Dynamo Kursk	(Russia)
SG	11	Leonor Rodríguez	28 – 21 October 1991	1.80 m (5 ft 11 in)	Çukurova Basketbol	(Turkey)
PF	13	Tamara Abalde	30 – 9 February 1989	1.92 m (6 ft 4 in)	Valencia Basket	(Spain)
SG	18	Queralt Casas	27 – 18 November 1992	1.80 m (5 ft 11 in)	Sopron Basket	(Hungary)
SF	22	María Conde	23 – 14 January 1997	1.86 m (6 ft 1 in)	CCC Polkowice	(Poland)
C	23	Nogaye Lo	23 – 23 August 1996	1.92 m (6 ft 4 in)	CD Zamarat	(Spain)
C	24	Laura Gil	27 – 24 April 1992	1.90 m (6 ft 3 in)	Perfumerías Avenida	(Spain)

Head coach

- (Spain) Lucas Mondelo

Assistant coach(es)

- (Spain) Isaac Fernández
- (Spain) Madelen Urieta

Legend

- Club – describes last played
  club before the tournament
- Age – describes age
  on 6 February 2020
