= 2015 FIBA Asia Women's Championship =

Asian women's basketball tournament

2015 FIBA Women's Asia Cup
26th Asian Women's Basketball Championship

Tournament details
- Host country: China
- Dates: 29 August–5 September
- Teams: 12 (from 45 federations)
- Venue: 1 (in 1 host city)

Final positions
- Champions: Japan (3rd title)

Tournament statistics
- MVP: (Japan) Ramu Tokashiki
- Top scorer: (North Korea) Pak (19.2)
- Top rebounds: (North Korea) Ro (11.5)
- Top assists: (Japan) Yoshida (5.1)
- PPG (Team): Japan (78.9)
- RPG (Team): Kazakhstan (58.4)
- APG (Team): South Korea (17.3)

Official website
- 2015 FIBA Asia Women's Championship

The 2015 FIBA Asia Women's Championship was the qualifying tournament for FIBA Asia at the women's basketball tournament at the 2016 Summer Olympics in Rio de Janeiro, Brazil. The tournament was held in Wuhan, China.

The championship was divided into two levels: Level I and Level II. The two lowest finishers of Level I met the top two finishers of Level II to determine which teams qualified for the top Level of the 2017 Championship. The losers were relegated to Level II.

== Qualifying ==
- Semifinalists of the 2013 FIBA Asia Championship for Women:
  - Japan
  - South Korea
  - China
  - Chinese Taipei
- Qualifying round winners at the 2013 FIBA Asia Championship for Women:
  - India
  - Thailand
- Levels:
  - Level I include teams that won in the 2013 qualifying round and the semifinalists of the 2013 championship.
  - Level II are the other teams. Teams that lost in the 2013 qualifying round and the teams that registered first for the championship are in this level.
  - Host nation's level is dependent on their performance in 2013.

== Draw ==
Included are the FIBA World Rankings prior to the draw.

Level I	Level II
China (8); South Korea (12); Japan (15); Chinese Taipei (35); India (39); Thailand (42)	Malaysia (40); Kazakhstan (49); Sri Lanka (54); Hong Kong (58); Philippines (58); North Korea (NR)

== Preliminary round ==
All times are local (UTC+08:00)

=== Level I ===
Pos	Team	Pld	W	L	PF	PA	PD	Pts	Qualification
1	Japan	5	5	0	402	227	+175	10	Advance to final round
2	China	5	4	1	421	250	+171	9	Advance to final round
3	South Korea	5	3	2	405	276	+129	8	Advance to final round
4	Chinese Taipei	5	2	3	369	315	+54	7	Advance to final round
5	Thailand	5	1	4	225	481	−256	6	Qualification to qualifying round
6	India	5	0	5	238	511	−273	5	Qualification to qualifying round

First match(es) will be played: 29 August 2015. Source: FIBA
Rules for classification: (1) Tournament points, (2) Head-to-head tournament points, (3) Head-to-head goal average, (4) Overall goal average, (5) Drawing of lots

29 August
15:00

Report

Chinese Taipei	92–61	India
Scoring by quarter: 22–11, 15–14, 29–18, 26–18
Pts: Wei Y.C. 20; Rebs: Lin C.W. 5 Asts: Lin C.W. 5		Pts: Subhashmon 17; Rebs: Limaye 7 Asts: Radhakrishnan 3

Wuhan Sports Center Gymnasium, Wuhan
Referees: Harja Jaladri (INA), Editha Botecario (PHI), Lim Sok Hoon (MAS)

29 August
17:30

Report

South Korea	53–59	Japan
Scoring by quarter: 13-13, 17-18, 15-15, 8-13
Pts: Yang J.H., Kim J.E. 15; Rebs: Yang J.H. 10; Asts: Lee K.E. 4		Pts: Tokashiki, Motokawa 12; Rebs: Mamiya 10; Asts: Yoshida 6

Wuhan Sports Center Gymnasium, Wuhan
Referees: Snehal Bendke (IND), Alexey Stepanenko (KAZ), Yuen Chun Yip (HKG)

29 August
19:30

Report

Thailand	34–113	China
Scoring by quarter: 9–28, 6–27, 14–23, 5–35
Pts: Maihom 14; Rebs: Maihom 6 Asts: Saechua 2		Pts: Song 16; Rebs: Sun M.R. 10; Asts: Yang L.W. 5

Wuhan Sports Center Gymnasium, Wuhan
Referees: Harja Jaladri (INA), Alexandr Rulyov (KAZ), Reynaldo Yante (PHI)

30 August
15:00

Report

Chinese Taipei	113–42	Thailand
Scoring by quarter: 23–10, 32–8, 32–8, 26–16
Pts: Wei Y.C. 21; Rebs: Bao H.L. 10; Asts: Peng S.C., Wu Y.C. 4		Pts: Maihom 13; Rebs: Saechua 8 Asts: Saechua 4

Wuhan Sports Center Gymnasium, Wuhan
Referees: Alexandr Rulyov (KAZ), Snehal Bendke (IND), Editha Botecario (PHI)

30 August
17:30

Report

Japan	131–31	India
Scoring by quarter: 32–9, 31–12, 25–6, 43–4
Pts: Shinozaki 25; Rebs: O 11; Asts: Machida 16		Pts: Mahesha 6 Rebs: Radhakrishnan 6 Asts: Geetha, Radhakrishnan 2

Wuhan Sports Center Gymnasium, Wuhan
Referees: Yuen Chun Yip (HKG), Kim Ok Sim (PRK), Lim Sok Hoon (MAS)

30 August
19:30

Report

South Korea	58–74	China
Scoring by quarter: 18–15, 11–12, 15–23, 14–24
Pts: Lee K.E., Bae H.Y. 10; Rebs: Bae H.Y. 8 Asts: Park H.J. 4		Pts: Shao 17; Rebs: Sun M.R. 7 Asts: Shao, Sun M.R. 4

Wuhan Sports Center Gymnasium, Wuhan
Referees: Harja Jaladri (INA), Alexey Stepanenko (KAZ), Reynaldo Yante (PHI)

31 August
15:00

Report

Thailand	41–97	South Korea
Scoring by quarter: 9–23, 8–22, 11–25, 13–27
Pts: Buapa 9 Rebs: Phetsaenkha, Kruatiwa 5 Asts: Saechua 3		Pts: Kang A.J. 30; Rebs: Park J.S. 13; Asts: Kim G.H. 9

Wuhan Sports Center Gymnasium, Wuhan
Referees: Yuen Chun Yip (HKG), Alexandr Rulyov (KAZ), Reynaldo Yante (PHI)

31 August
17:30

Report

Chinese Taipei	44–60	Japan
Scoring by quarter: 15–8, 8–25, 15–9, 6–18
Pts: Peng S.C. 10; Rebs: Bao H.L. 8 Asts: Chang H.K. 5		Pts: Yamamoto 14; Rebs: Mamiya 15; Asts: Yamamoto 3

Wuhan Sports Center Gymnasium, Wuhan
Referees: Harja Jaladri (INA), Snehal Bendke (IND), Alexey Stepanenko (KAZ)

31 August
19:30

Report

China	102–39	India
Scoring by quarter: 29–4, 18–11, 35–20, 20–4
Pts: Gao 18; Rebs: Gao 12; Asts: Yang L.W. 8		Pts: Subhashmon, Skaria 10; Rebs: Skaria 7 Asts: Radhakrishnan, Skaria, Mahesha 1

Wuhan Sports Center Gymnasium, Wuhan
Referees: Lim Sok Hoon (MAS), Editha Botecario (PHI), Kim Ok Sim (PRK)

1 September
15:00

Report

India	63–65	Thailand
Scoring by quarter: 14–21, 17–14, 17–13, 15–17
Pts: Skaria 21; Rebs: Radhakrishnan 12; Asts: 4 players 1		Pts: Kruatiwa 21; Rebs: Maihom 10; Asts: Buapa 4

Wuhan Sports Center Gymnasium, Wuhan
Referees: Yuen Chun Yip (HKG), Editha Botecario (PHI), Kim Ok Sim (PRK)

1 September
17:30

Report

South Korea	76–58	Chinese Taipei
Scoring by quarter: 24–8, 8–12, 26–13, 18–25
Pts: Park H.J. 17; Rebs: Yang J.H. 9 Asts: Lee K.E. 6		Pts: Lin Y.T., Wu Y.C. 14; Rebs: Lin C.W. 6 Asts: Lin Y.T. 2

Wuhan Sports Center Gymnasium, Wuhan
Referees: Snehal Bendke (IND), Lim Sok Hoon (MAS), Alexey Stepanenko (KAZ)

1 September
19:30

Report

Japan	57–56	China
Scoring by quarter: 18–13, 19–18, 8–12, 12–13
Pts: Tokashiki 19; Rebs: Yoshida 10; Asts: Yoshida 7		Pts: Shao 15; Rebs: Sun M.R. 10; Asts: Chen X.J. 3

Wuhan Sports Center Gymnasium, Wuhan
Referees: Harja Jaladri (INA), Alexandr Rulyov (KAZ), Reynaldo Yante (PHI)

2 September
15:00

Report

India	44–121	South Korea
Scoring by quarter: 13–38, 7–29, 12–25, 12–29
Pts: Skaria 15; Rebs: Skaria 9 Asts: Geetha, Mahesha, Rajaganapathi 2		Pts: Kim D.B. 20; Rebs: Yang J.H. 6 Asts: Lee K.E., Kim G.H. 6

Wuhan Sports Center Gymnasium, Wuhan
Referees: Lim Sok Hoon (MAS), Editha Botecario (PHI), Harja Jaladri (INA)

2 September
17:30

Report

Thailand	43–95	Japan
Scoring by quarter: 6–26, 13–24, 18–18, 6–27
Pts: Maihom 15; Rebs: Sorot, Buapa, Saengsawang 6 Asts: Saengsawang 1		Pts: Motokawa 16; Rebs: O 13; Asts: Kurihara, Machida 5

Wuhan Sports Center Gymnasium, Wuhan
Attendance: .
Referees: Alexey Stepanenko (KAZ), Kim Ok Sim (PRK), Yuen Chun Yip (HKG)

2 September
19:30

Report

China	76–62	Chinese Taipei
Scoring by quarter: 18–18, 26–18, 16–16, 16–10
Pts: Chen X.J. 17; Rebs: Shao 9 Asts: Shao 4		Pts: Chang C.F. 13; Rebs: Lin C.W. 7 Asts: Chang H.K. 4

Wuhan Sports Center Gymnasium, Wuhan
Referees: Reynaldo Yante (PHI), Snehal Bendke (IND), Alexandr Rulyov (KAZ)

=== Level II ===
Pos	Team	Pld	W	L	PF	PA	PD	Pts	Qualification
1	Philippines	5	4	1	352	318	+34	9	Qualification to qualifying round
2	North Korea	5	4	1	300	203	+97	9	Qualification to qualifying round
3	Kazakhstan	5	3	2	378	311	+67	8	Eliminated
4	Malaysia	5	3	2	316	314	+2	8	Eliminated
5	Hong Kong	5	1	4	243	304	−61	6	Eliminated
6	Sri Lanka	5	0	5	215	354	−139	5	Eliminated

First match(es) will be played: 29 August 2015. Source: FIBA
Rules for classification: (1) Tournament points, (2) Head-to-head tournament points, (3) Head-to-head goal average, (4) Overall goal average, (5) Drawing of lots

29 August
9:00

Report

Hong Kong	48–99	Kazakhstan
Scoring by quarter: 13–30, 12–19, 11–22, 13–28
Pts: Lam P.Y. 11; Rebs: Wong T.C., So C.Y., Cheng W.S. 5 Asts: Lam P.Y. 2		Pts: Abdreupova, Vinokurova 18; Rebs: Vinokurova 17; Asts: Karnova, Yagodkina, Kurazova 3

Wuhan Sports Center Gymnasium, Wuhan
Referees: Rajnarayan Patro (IND), Kim Cheong-Soo (KOR), Tsung Hsiu-Hui (TPE)

29 August
11:00

Report

Philippines	64–71	Malaysia
Scoring by quarter: 11–14, 14–17, 21–24, 18–16
Pts: Lim 17; Rebs: Lim 8 Asts: 4 players 2		Pts: Ting 17; Rebs: Pang H.P., Wong M.C. 7 Asts: Pang H.P., Saw W.Y. 5

Wuhan Sports Center Gymnasium, Wuhan
Referees: Peng Ling (CHN), Kumiko Kumagai (JPN), Lee Seung-Mu (KOR)

29 August
13:00

Report

Sri Lanka	35–82	North Korea
Scoring by quarter: 8–25, 14–20, 9–16, 4–21
Pts: Ekanayake 14; Rebs: Ekanayake 9 Asts: Wanniachchige, Don Thalagala 1		Pts: Pak H.J. 19; Rebs: Jang M.G. 13; Asts: Kim H. 6

Wuhan Sports Center Gymnasium, Wuhan
Referees: Watcharin Padungratchadakit (THA), Shoko Suguro (JPN), Wang Zebo (CHN)

30 August
9:00

Report

Hong Kong	72–52	Sri Lanka
Scoring by quarter: 17–17, 21–18, 26–5, 8–12
Pts: Lam P.Y., Tong H.L. 21; Rebs: Chan H.Y. 11; Asts: Tong H.L. 4		Pts: Ekanayake 15; Rebs: Gunawijeya 19; Asts: Beruwalage 3

Wuhan Sports Center Gymnasium, Wuhan
Referees: Watcharin Padungratchadakit (THA), Kim Cheong-Soo (KOR), Kumiko Kumagai (JPN)

30 August
11:00

Report

Malaysia	65–73	Kazakhstan
Scoring by quarter: 20–14, 11–18, 7–18, 27–23
Pts: Pang H.P. 16; Rebs: Saw W.Y. 9 Asts: Saw W.Y., Choo S.P. 4		Pts: Ossipenko 21; Rebs: Ossipenko 10; Asts: Abdreupova 3

Wuhan Sports Center Gymnasium, Wuhan
Referees: Shoko Suguro (JPN), Rajnarayan Patro (IND), Zuo Kun (CHN)

30 August
13:00

Report

Philippines	68–67	North Korea
Scoring by quarter: 7–16, 23–19, 14–17, 24–15
Pts: Resultay, Lim 14; Rebs: Bernardino 9 Asts: Dy 3		Pts: Ro S.Y. 21; Rebs: Ro S.Y. 11; Asts: Jang M.G. 4

Wuhan Sports Center Gymnasium, Wuhan
Referees: Lee Seung-Mu (KOR), Shi Jing (CHN), Tsung Hsiu-Hui (TPE)

31 August
9:00

Report

Sri Lanka	45–65	Philippines
Scoring by quarter: 14–14, 6–22, 9–10, 16–19
Pts: Silva 10; Rebs: Gunawijeya 11; Asts: Beruwalage 4		Pts: Gupilan 15; Rebs: Bernardino 10; Asts: Tongco, Miranda 2

Wuhan Sports Center Gymnasium, Wuhan
Referees: Shoko Suguro (JPN), Kim Cheong-Soo (KOR), Wang Zebo (CHN)

31 August
11:00

Report

Hong Kong	61–78	Malaysia
Scoring by quarter: 14–12, 11–29, 17–14, 19–23
Pts: Cheuk 21; Rebs: Cheuk 11; Asts: Cheuk 4		Pts: Yap F.Y. 24; Rebs: Low 9 Asts: Pang H.P. 5

Wuhan Sports Center Gymnasium, Wuhan
Referees: Lee Seung-Mu (KOR), Rajnarayan Patro (IND), Tsung Hsiu-Hui (TPE)

31 August
13:00

Report

North Korea	68–55	Kazakhstan
Scoring by quarter: 25–13, 15–11, 13–11, 15–20
Pts: Ro S.Y. 23; Rebs: Ro S.Y. 13; Asts: Jang M.G., Kim H. 5		Pts: Kondrakova 16; Rebs: Kondrakova 9 Asts: Dots, Yagodkina 3

Wuhan Sports Center Gymnasium, Wuhan
Referees: Peng Ling (CHN), Kumiko Kumagai (JPN), Watcharin Padungratchadakit (THA)

1 September
9:00

Report

Kazakhstan	78–50	Sri Lanka
Scoring by quarter: 21–9, 18–22, 22–11, 17–8
Pts: Yagodkina, Kurazova 13; Rebs: Vinokurova 9 Asts: Karnova, Yagodkina, Kondrakova 3		Pts: Ekanayake 17; Rebs: Silva 11; Asts: Beruwalage 3

Wuhan Sports Center Gymnasium, Wuhan
Referees: Zuo Kun (CHN), Kumiko Kumagai (JPN), Lee Seung-Mu (KOR)

1 September
11:00

Report

Philippines	75–62	Hong Kong
Scoring by quarter: 16–15, 26–13, 21–17, 12–17
Pts: Lim 20; Rebs: Sambile 10; Asts: Lim 4		Pts: Cheuk 17; Rebs: Chu H.Y. 7 Asts: Lam P.Y. 3

Wuhan Sports Center Gymnasium, Wuhan
Referees: Kim Cheong-Soo (KOR), Shoko Suguro (JPN), Tsung Hsiu-Hui (TPE)

1 September
13:00

Report

Malaysia	45–83	North Korea
Scoring by quarter: 12–23, 9–20, 11–19, 13–21
Pts: Ting 12; Rebs: Saw W.Y. 5 Asts: Saw W.Y. 3		Pts: Pak H.J. 29; Rebs: Ro S.Y. 11; Asts: Jang M.G., Kim H., Ro S.Y. 3

Wuhan Sports Center Gymnasium, Wuhan
Referees: Watcharin Padungratchadakit (THA), Rajnarayan Patro (IND), Shi Jing (CHN)

2 September
9:00

Report

Kazakhstan	73–80 (OT)	Philippines
Scoring by quarter: 23–20, 9–13, 23–16, 8–14, Overtime: 10–17
Pts: Yagodkina, Ossipenko 19; Rebs: Yagodkina 11; Asts: Karnova 5		Pts: Arayi 28; Rebs: Bernardino 14; Asts: Bernardino 5

Wuhan Sports Center Gymnasium, Wuhan
Referees: Lee Seungmu (KOR), Tsung Hsiu-Hui (TPE), Wang Zebo (CHN)

2 September
11:00

Report

Sri Lanka	33–57	Malaysia
Scoring by quarter: 5–18, 7–11, 12–12, 9–16
Pts: Juwan Pedige 12; Rebs: Silva 11; Asts: Ekanayake 3		Pts: Chong Y.Y. 8 Rebs: Ng S.Y. 11; Asts: Chong Y.Y. 3

Wuhan Sports Center Gymnasium, Wuhan
Referees: Peng Ling (CHN), Kim Cheong-Soo (KOR), Kumiko Kumagai (JPN)

2 September
13:00

Report

North Korea	66–43	Hong Kong
Scoring by quarter: 16–14, 20–6, 13–6, 17–17
Pts: Ro S.Y. 20; Rebs: Ro S.Y. 13; Asts: Jang M.G., Kim H. 4		Pts: Cheuk 27; Rebs: Chan H.Y. 7 Asts: Chan H.Y. 2

Wuhan Sports Center Gymnasium, Wuhan
Referees: Watcharin Padungratchadakit (THA), Rajnarayan Patro (IND), Shoko Suguro (JPN)

== Qualifying round ==
Winners are promoted to Division A of the 2017 FIBA Asia Women's Cup.

4 September
13:00

Report

Thailand	50–66	North Korea
Scoring by quarter: 14–14, 10–15, 11–17, 15–20
Pts: Kruatiwa 16; Rebs: Kaichaiyapoom 12; Asts: 7 players 1		Pts: Pak H.J. 21; Rebs: Ro S.Y. 16; Asts: Kim P.C. 6

Wuhan Sports Center Gymnasium, Wuhan
Referees: Shoko Suguro (JPN), Wang Zebo (CHN), Yuen Chun Yip (HKG)

4 September
15:00

Report

India	76–82	Philippines
Scoring by quarter: 22–16, 15–23, 16–26, 23–17
Pts: Skaria 28; Rebs: Radhakrishnan 8 Asts: Paul Durai 3		Pts: Bernardino 32; Rebs: Lim 9 Asts: Bernardino 5

Wuhan Sports Center Gymnasium, Wuhan
Referees: Peng Ling (CHN), Kumiko Kumagai (JPN), Lee Seung-Mu (KOR)

== Final round ==
Champions qualify to the 2016 Summer Olympics; runner-up and third place qualify to the 2016 World Qualifying Tournament.

Semifinals
4 September
Japan	65
Chinese Taipei	58
4 September
China	60
South Korea	45

Final
5 September
Japan	85
China	50
Third place
5 September
Chinese Taipei	45
South Korea	52

=== Semifinals ===
4 September
17:30

Report

Japan	65–58	Chinese Taipei
Scoring by quarter: 23–11, 11–22, 9–13, 22–12
Pts: Tokashiki, Motokawa 15; Rebs: Motokawa 9 Asts: Yoshida 9		Pts: Bao H.L. 18; Rebs: Bao H.L. 9 Asts: Chang H.K. 4

Wuhan Sports Center Gymnasium, Wuhan
Referees: Harja Jaladri (INA), Lim Sok Hoon (MAS), Reynaldo Yante (PHI)

4 September
19:30

Report

China	60–45	South Korea
Scoring by quarter: 19–6, 12–10, 16–6, 13–23
Pts: Huang H.P. 10; Rebs: Zhang, Song, Huang H.P. 8 Asts: five players 2		Pts: Yang J.H. 12; Rebs: Kim D.B. 6 Asts: Yang J.H. 3

Wuhan Sports Center Gymnasium, Wuhan
Referees: Snehal Bendke (IND), Alexandr Rulyov (KAZ), Alexey Stepanenko (KAZ)

=== Third place game ===
5 September
17:30

Report

Chinese Taipei	45–52	South Korea
Scoring by quarter: 6–13, 15–14, 15–19, 9–6
Pts: Huang P.J. 11; Rebs: Bao H.L. 10; Asts: Chang H.K.		Pts: Kim D.B. 15; Rebs: Lee K.E. 10; Asts: Yang J.H. 3

Wuhan Sports Center Gymnasium, Wuhan
Referees: Shoko Suguro (JPN), Harja Jaladri (INA), Alexandr Rulyov (KAZ)

=== Final ===
5 September
19:30

Report

Japan	85–50	China
Scoring by quarter: 23–11, 21–11, 24–12, 17–16
Pts: Motokawa 24; Rebs: Mamiya, Tokashiki 7 Asts: Yoshida 7		Pts: four players 7 Rebs: Sun M.R. 8 Asts: Huang H.P. 3

Wuhan Sports Center Gymnasium, Wuhan
Referees: Snehal Bendke (IND), Lim Sok Hoon (MAS), Alexey Stepanenko (KAZ)

== Final standing ==
	Qualified for Basketball at the 2016 Summer Olympics – Women's tournament
	Qualified for the 2016 FIBA World Olympic Qualifying Tournament for Women
*	Qualified for Division A of the 2017 FIBA Asia Women's Cup

Rank	Team	Record
1st place, gold medalist(s)	Japan*	7–0
2nd place, silver medalist(s)	China*	5–2
3rd place, bronze medalist(s)	South Korea*	4–3
4	Chinese Taipei*	2–5
5	Thailand	1–5
6	India	0–6
7	Philippines*	5–1
8	North Korea*	5–1
9	Kazakhstan	3–2
10	Malaysia	3–2
11	Hong Kong	1–4
12	Sri Lanka	0–5

== All-2015 FIBA Asia Women's Team ==
PG – (Japan) Asami Yoshida
SG – (China) Shao Ting
SF – (South Korea) Kim Dan-bi
PF – (Japan) Ramu Tokashiki (Tournament MVP)
C – (China) Sun Mengran
