= 2013 FIBA Asia Championship for Women =

2013 FIBA Women's Asia Cup
25th Asian Women's Basketball Championship
- Official logo of the 2013 FIBA Asia Championship for Women

Tournament details
- Host country: Thailand
- Dates: October 27 – November 3
- Teams: 12 (from 44 federations)
- Venue: 1 (in 1 host city)

Final positions
- Champions: Japan (2nd title)

Tournament statistics
- MVP: (Japan) Ramu Tokashiki
- Top scorer: (Japan) Tokashiki (17.1)
- Top rebounds: (Uzbekistan) Komarova (9.4)
- Top assists: (South Korea) Lee S.A. (5.0)
- PPG (Team): China (76.7)
- RPG (Team): Uzbekistan (33.0)
- APG (Team): Japan (16.1)

Official website
- 2013 FIBA Asia Championship for Women

The 2013 FIBA Asia Championship for Women was the qualifying tournament for FIBA Asia at the 2014 FIBA World Championship for Women in Turkey. The tournament was held in Bangkok, Thailand from October 27 to November 3.

The championship was divided into two levels: Level I and Level II. The two lowest finishers of Level I met the top two finishers of Level II to determine which teams qualify for the top Level of the 2015 Championship. The losers were relegated to Level II.

Japan defeated South Korea 65–43 in the final to capture their second title.

== Participating teams ==
According to FIBA Asia Rules, the number of participating teams in the FIBA Asia Championship for Women was set at twelve. In order to balance the level of competitions, the Championship shall be played in two levels: Level I and Level II. The number of the teams in Level I is set at six. The six teams of Level I are set with reference to the 2011 FIBA Asia Championship for Women. The six teams of Level II are set with reference to the first six teams registered with respect to the deadlines.

Level I	Level II
China; South Korea; Japan; Chinese Taipei; India; Kazakhstan	Malaysia; Indonesia; Uzbekistan; Thailand; Philippines; Hong Kong

- Lebanon were supposed to compete but were disallowed due to the suspension of their federation. Kazakhstan, the team that they beat in the 2011 qualifying round, were promoted to Level I from Level II to replace the Lebanese's vacated place. Kazakhstan's place in Level II was taken over by the Philippines, the first team on the waiting list.
- North Korea were supposed to compete but withdrew; they were replaced by Hong Kong, the second team on the waiting list.

== Squads ==
Each team has twelve players on its roster. FIBA permits one naturalised player for each team.

== Preliminary round ==
Advances to the semifinals
Advances to the qualifying round

=== Level I ===
Team	Pld	W	L	PF	PA	PD	Pts	Tie
Japan	5	5	0	384	282	+102	10	
China	5	3	2	410	295	+115	8	1–1; 1.15
South Korea	5	3	2	402	329	+73	8	1–1; 0.98
Chinese Taipei	5	3	2	355	326	+29	8	1–1; 0.88
India	5	1	4	260	434	−174	6	
Kazakhstan	5	0	5	296	441	−145	5	

27 October 2013
14:00

Boxscore

Kazakhstan	59–94	Japan
Scoring by quarter: 16–20, 15–38, 11–16, 17–20
Pts: Demidenko 20; Rebs: Vinokurova 3 Asts: Protsenko 2		Pts: Tokashiki 15; Rebs: Mamiya 6 Asts: Yoshida 5

Bangkok Youth Centre, Bangkok
Referees: Cheung Kwok Shun Andy (HKG), Ricor Buaron (PHI), Lim Sok Hoon (MAS)

27 October 2013
16:00

Boxscore

Chinese Taipei	85–57	India
Scoring by quarter: 27–10, 24–20, 17–10, 17–17
Pts: Wu Y-t. 18; Rebs: Cheng H-y. 5 Asts: Huang F-s. 6		Pts: Pauldurai 22; Rebs: Jose 5 Asts: Pauldurai 3

Bangkok Youth Centre, Bangkok
Referees: Wong Hwee Liak (SIN), Watcharin Padungratchadakit (THA), Yuen Chun Yip (HKG)

27 October 2013
20:00

Boxscore

South Korea	72–70	China
Scoring by quarter: 17–14, 17–15, 21–20, 17–21
Pts: Kim J-E. 19; Rebs: Shin J-J. 9 Asts: Shin J-J. 4		Pts: Lu 24; Rebs: Gao, Lu 4 Asts: Huang 2

Bangkok Youth Centre, Bangkok
Referees: Ferdinand Pascual (PHI), Harja Jaladri (INA), Thongchai Thaweewutsophon (THA)

28 October 2013
14:00

Boxscore

India	62–109	South Korea
Scoring by quarter: 16–29, 9–29, 20–21, 17–30
Pts: Jose 17; Rebs: Jose 8 Asts: Pauldurai 3		Pts: Park J-E. 26; Rebs: Lee S-A. 7 Asts: Lee S-A. 10

Bangkok Youth Centre, Bangkok
Referees: Ricor Buaron (PHI), Yuen Chun Yip (HKG), Preeda Moungmee (THA)

28 October 2013
16:00

Boxscore

Kazakhstan	62–103	China
Scoring by quarter: 9–27, 18–28, 14–27, 21–21
Pts: Alishauskaite 18; Rebs: Sedova, Vinokurova 4 Asts: six players 1		Pts: Cheng, Gao 16; Rebs: Sun 5 Asts: Zhao 8

Bangkok Youth Centre, Bangkok
Referees: Wong Hwee Liak (SIN), Ferdinand Pascual (PHI), Watcharin Padungratchadakit (THA)

28 October 2013
20:00

Boxscore

Japan	69–57	Chinese Taipei
Scoring by quarter: 22–13, 20–11, 16–13, 11–20
Pts: Miyamoto 20; Rebs: Tokashiki 8 Asts: Yoshida 8		Pts: Lin C-w. 14; Rebs: Tsai P-c. 5 Asts: Cheng H-y., Tsai P-c. 3

Bangkok Youth Centre, Bangkok
Referees: Ferdinand Pascual (PHI), Lim Sok Hoon (MAS), Yuen Chun Yip (HKG)

29 October 2013
14:00

Boxscore

China	97–36	India
Scoring by quarter: 27–8, 19–11, 25–7, 26–10
Pts: Ji 16; Rebs: Chen, Gao 7 Asts: Chen 4		Pts: Jose 11; Rebs: Palanilkumkalayil Skaria 4 Asts: Jose, Sidhu 4

Bangkok Youth Centre, Bangkok
Referees: Lim Sok Hoon (MAS), Harja Jaladri (INA), Watcharin Padungratchadakit (THA)

29 October 2013
16:00

Boxscore

Chinese Taipei	87–57	Kazakhstan
Scoring by quarter: 15–14, 24–12, 18–16, 30–15
Pts: Huang P-j. 37; Rebs: three players 4 Asts: Cheng H-y. 5		Pts: Vinokurova 14; Rebs: Baidussenova, Vinokurova 10; Asts: Alishauskaite 3

Bangkok Youth Centre, Bangkok
Referees: Yuen Chun Yip (HKG), Ricor Buaron (PHI), Thongchai Thaweewutsophon (THA)

29 October 2013
20:00

Boxscore

South Korea	71–78 (OT)	Japan
Scoring by quarter: 20–24, 14–10, 13–15, 22–20, Overtime: 2–9
Pts: Beon Y-H. 17; Rebs: Lee M-S. 4 Asts: Lee M-S. 5		Pts: Tokashiki 27; Rebs: Tokashiki 10; Asts: Oga 6

Bangkok Youth Centre, Bangkok
Referees: Ferdinand Pascual (PHI), Preeda Moungmee (THA), Cheung Kwok Shun Andy (HKG)

30 October 2013
14:00

Boxscore

Kazakhstan	56–92	South Korea
Scoring by quarter: 10–22, 19–21, 1–25, 26–24
Pts: three players 10; Rebs: Baidussenova 6 Asts: Alishauskaite 3		Pts: Park H-J. 34; Rebs: Kang Y-S. 7 Asts: Kwak J-Y., Lee M-S. 5

Bangkok Youth Centre, Bangkok
Referees: Watcharin Padungratchadakit (THA), Wong Hwee Liak (SIN), Ricor Buaron (PHI)

30 October 2013
16:00

Boxscore

Japan	81–40	India
Scoring by quarter: 24–8, 19–10, 22–10, 16–12
Pts: O 14; Rebs: O 14; Asts: Kudeken 6		Pts: Jose 14; Rebs: Jose 7 Asts: Radhakrishnan 3

Bangkok Youth Centre, Bangkok
Referees: Lim Sok Hoon (MAS), Cheung Kwok Shun Andy (HKG), Thongchai Thaweewutsophon (THA)

30 October 2013
20:00

Boxscore

Chinese Taipei	63–85	China
Scoring by quarter: 19–17, 7–27, 10–20, 27–21
Pts: Wu Y-t. 14; Rebs: Lin C-w. 8 Asts: Chen Y-f. 2		Pts: Chen, Gao 17; Rebs: Gao 11; Asts: Qiu 3

Bangkok Youth Centre, Bangkok
Referees: Harja Jaladri (INA), Ferdinand Pascual (PHI), Preeda Moungmee (THA)

31 October 2013
14:00

Boxscore

India	65–62 (OT)	Kazakhstan
Scoring by quarter: 16–14, 19–10, 10–21, 10–10, Overtime: 10–7
Pts: Pauldurai 18; Rebs: Nixon 7 Asts: Limaye 4		Pts: Ivanova 16; Rebs: Ivanova 11; Asts: Alishauskaite 2

Bangkok Youth Centre, Bangkok
Referees: Yoko Tomita (JPN), Yuen Chun Yip (HKG), Preeda Moungmee (THA)

31 October 2013
16:00

Boxscore

China	55–62	Japan
Scoring by quarter: 9–12, 9–13, 20–25, 17–12
Pts: Chen 16; Rebs: Gao 7 Asts: Sun 3		Pts: Tokashiki 20; Rebs: Tokashiki 12; Asts: Yoshida 4

Bangkok Youth Centre, Bangkok
Referees: Harja Jaladri (INA), Ricor Buaron (PHI), Watcharin Padungratchadakit (THA)

31 October 2013
20:00

Boxscore

South Korea	58–63	Chinese Taipei
Scoring by quarter: 14–19, 19–17, 9–7, 16–20
Pts: Beon Y-H. 23; Rebs: Lee M-S., Yang J-H. 6 Asts: Lee M-S. 3		Pts: Chen Y-c. 16; Rebs: Tsai P-c., Huang P-j. 4 Asts: Huang P-j. 4

Bangkok Youth Centre, Bangkok
Referees: Thongchai Thaweewutsophon (THA), Lim Sok Hoon (MAS), Arsen Andryushkin (KAZ)

=== Level II ===
Team	Pld	W	L	PF	PA	PD	Pts	Tie
Thailand	5	4	1	324	282	+42	9	1–0
Malaysia	5	4	1	313	204	+109	9	0–1
Indonesia	5	3	2	320	295	+25	8	1–0
Philippines	5	3	2	324	291	+33	8	0–1
Uzbekistan	5	1	4	267	318	−51	6	
Hong Kong	5	0	5	261	379	−118	5	

27 October 2013
10:00

Boxscore

Philippines	87–57	Hong Kong
Scoring by quarter: 23–19, 28–14, 18–14, 18–10
Pts: Almazan 22; Rebs: Almazan 7 Asts: Grajales 6		Pts: Chu H., Law L. 11; Rebs: Lo H. 4 Asts: Lo H. 4

Bangkok Youth Centre, Bangkok
Referees: Arsen Andryushkin (KAZ), Tsung Hsiu-Hui (TPE), Ceciline Vincent (IND)

27 October 2013
12:00

Boxscore

Indonesia	49–61	Malaysia
Scoring by quarter: 11–16, 12–10, 17–16, 9–19
Pts: Ayuningrum 18; Rebs: Ayuningrum 6 Asts: Ayuningrum, Christaline 3		Pts: Pang H. 13; Rebs: Yap C. 7 Asts: Saw W., Yong S. 3

Bangkok Youth Centre, Bangkok
Referees: Yoko Tomita (JPN), Hwang In-Tae (KOR), Song Xiaojing (CHN)

27 October 2013
18:00

Boxscore

Thailand	60–41	Uzbekistan
Scoring by quarter: 21–8, 15–11, 14–11, 10–11
Pts: Banmoo 12; Rebs: Mathuros 6 Asts: Saechua, Mathuros 2		Pts: Koneva 9 Rebs: Komarova 6 Asts: Zakharova 2

Bangkok Youth Centre, Bangkok
Referees: Peng Ling (CHN), Snehal Bendke (IND), Kim Bo-Hui (KOR)

28 October 2013
10:00

Boxscore

Hong Kong	45–79	Indonesia
Scoring by quarter: 8–19, 16–18, 10–21, 11–21
Pts: Yap Y. 11; Rebs: Lu H. 8 Asts: Lam P. 4		Pts: Ibo 14; Rebs: Ramadhani 8 Asts: four players 3

Bangkok Youth Centre, Bangkok
Referees: Hwang In-Tae (KOR), Tsung Hsiu-Hui (TPE), Snehal Bendke (IND)

28 October 2013
12:00

Boxscore

Uzbekistan	55–62	Philippines
Scoring by quarter: 12–23, 14–14, 17–6, 13–19
Pts: Koneva 14; Rebs: Komarova 11; Asts: Khusnitdinova, Sevastyanova 6		Pts: Grajales 13; Rebs: Tioseco, Almazan 4 Asts: Grajales 3

Bangkok Youth Centre, Bangkok
Referees: Song Xiaojing (CHN), Kim Bo-Hui (KOR), Arsen Andryushkin (KAZ)

28 October 2013
18:00

Boxscore

Thailand	60–56	Malaysia
Scoring by quarter: 11–11, 14–15, 24–16, 11–14
Pts: Yothanan 16; Rebs: Mathuros 8 Asts: Jantakan 4		Pts: Pang H. 12; Rebs: Lee S. 5 Asts: Pang H. 7

Bangkok Youth Centre, Bangkok
Referees: Yevgeniy Mikheyev (KAZ), Peng Ling (CHN), Yoko Tomita (JPN)

29 October 2013
10:00

Boxscore

Malaysia	73–38	Hong Kong
Scoring by quarter: 19–11, 21–9, 8–11, 25–7
Pts: Yap F 21; Rebs: three players 4 Asts: Kew S., Yong S. 4		Pts: Lam P. 12; Rebs: Chu H. 14; Asts: Lo H. 3

Bangkok Youth Centre, Bangkok
Referees: Arsen Andryushkin (KAZ), Kim Bo-Hui (KOR), Ceciline Vincent (IND)

29 October 2013
12:00

Boxscore

Indonesia	71–60	Uzbekistan
Scoring by quarter: 24–10, 19–11, 20–18, 8–21
Pts: Ayuningrum 18; Rebs: Ibo 8 Asts: Ayuningrum 5		Pts: Komarova 15; Rebs: Komarova 5 Asts: Kashuba 5

Bangkok Youth Centre, Bangkok
Referees: Tsung Hsiu-hui (TPE), Yoko Tomita (JPN), Peng Ling (CHN)

29 October 2013
18:00

Boxscore

Philippines	65–59	Thailand
Scoring by quarter: 17–11, 17–13, 16–9, 15–26
Pts: Almazan 17; Rebs: Almazan 7 Asts: Jacob 3		Pts: Yothanan 13; Rebs: Banmoo 3 Asts: Chirdpedcharat 6

Bangkok Youth Centre, Bangkok
Referees: Snehal Bendke (IND), Hwang In-Tae (KOR), Yevgeniy Mikheyev (KAZ)

30 October 2013
10:00

Boxscore

Uzbekistan	70–62	Hong Kong
Scoring by quarter: 13–14, 14–13, 26–17, 17–18
Pts: Komarova 20; Rebs: Kirienko, Komarova 11; Asts: Khusnitdinova 7		Pts: Cheuk 16; Rebs: Lo H. 8 Asts: Lo H. 5

Bangkok Youth Centre, Bangkok
Referees: Snehal Bendke (IND), Tsung Hsiu-hui (TPE), Yoko Tomita (JPN)

30 October 2013
12:00

Boxscore

Philippines	56–60	Malaysia
Scoring by quarter: 17–11, 14–19, 5–17, 20–13
Pts: Jacob 17; Rebs: Almazan 5 Asts: Arayi, Grajales 4		Pts: Goh 17; Rebs: Hee S. 4 Asts: Pang H. 3

Bangkok Youth Centre, Bangkok
Referees: Peng Ling (CHN), Yevgeniy Mikheyev (KAZ), Kim Bo-Hui (KOR)

30 October 2013
18:00

Boxscore

Thailand	75–61	Indonesia
Scoring by quarter: 13–18, 19–9, 19–17, 24–17
Pts: Banmoo 15; Rebs: Yothanan 6 Asts: Yothanan, Banmoo 3		Pts: Christaline 18; Rebs: Ibo 7 Asts: Ayuningrum 6

Bangkok Youth Centre, Bangkok
Referees: Ceciline Vincent (IND), Arsen Andryushkin (KAZ), Song Xiaojing (CHN)

31 October 2013
10:00

Boxscore

Malaysia	63–41	Uzbekistan
Scoring by quarter: 21–17, 11–8, 16–7, 15–7
Pts: Goh 10; Rebs: Yap F 6 Asts: Saw W. 6		Pts: Komarova 16; Rebs: Komarova 14; Asts: Koneva 3

Bangkok Youth Centre, Bangkok
Referees: Kim Bo-Hui (KOR), Wong Hwee Liak (SIN), Song Xiaojing (CHN)

31 October 2013
12:00

Boxscore

Indonesia	60–54	Philippines
Scoring by quarter: 21–15, 20–18, 10–8, 9–13
Pts: Anggraeni 15; Rebs: Ibo 8 Asts: Ibo 3		Pts: Grajales 12; Rebs: Jacob 8 Asts: three players 2

Bangkok Youth Centre, Bangkok
Referees: Yevgeniy Mikheyev (KAZ), Cheung Kwok Shun Andy (HKG), Ceciline Vincent (IND)

31 October 2013
18:00

Boxscore

Hong Kong	59–70	Thailand
Scoring by quarter: 6–16, 20–17, 18–19, 15–18
Pts: Cheuk, Wong 14; Rebs: Chu 15; Asts: Lo 3		Pts: Maihom 20; Rebs: Janthabut 6 Asts: three players 3

Bangkok Youth Centre, Bangkok
Referees: Snehal Bendke (IND), Hwang In-Tae (KOR), Tsung Hsiu-hui (TPE)

== Qualifying round ==
Winners are promoted to Level I of the 2015 FIBA Asia Championship for Women.

2 November 2013
14:00

Boxscore

India	74–59	Malaysia
Scoring by quarter: 22–12, 18–16, 14–17, 20–14
Pts: Palanilkumkalayil Skaria 24; Rebs: Jose 13; Asts: Pauldurai 9		Pts: three players 10; Rebs: Yong S. 4 Asts: Yong S., Kew S. 2

Bangkok Youth Centre, Bangkok
Referees: Peng Ling (CHN), Kim Bo-Hui (KOR), Yuen Chun Yip (HKG)

2 November 2013
16:00

Boxscore

Kazakhstan	53–67	Thailand
Scoring by quarter: 13–21, 12–8, 9–16, 19–22
Pts: Alishauskaite 10; Rebs: Baidussenova 10; Asts: Alishauskaite 4		Pts: Yothanan 13; Rebs: four players 4 Asts: Yothanan 5

Bangkok Youth Centre, Bangkok
Referees: Yoko Tomita (JPN), Tsung Hsiu-Hui (TPE), Lim Sok Hoon (MAS)

== Final round ==
Top three teams qualify to the 2014 FIBA World Championship for Women.

Semifinals
2 November
Japan	74
Chinese Taipei	56
2 November
China	66
South Korea	71

Final
3 November
Japan	65
South Korea	43
Third place
3 November
Chinese Taipei	53
China	61

=== Semifinals ===
2 November 2013
18:00

Boxscore

China	66–71	South Korea
Scoring by quarter: 22–18, 14–16, 16–12, 14–25
Pts: Chen 23; Rebs: Gao 8 Asts: Lu 3		Pts: Beon Y-H. 22; Rebs: Kang Y-S. 4 Asts: Beon Y-H. 6

Bangkok Youth Centre, Bangkok
Referees: Snehal Bendke (IND), Yevgeniy Mikheyev (KAZ), Harja Jaladri (INA)

2 November 2013
20:00

Boxscore

Japan	74–56	Chinese Taipei
Scoring by quarter: 24–10, 16–12, 12–10, 22–24
Pts: Tokashiki 17; Rebs: Tokashiki 8 Asts: Oga 5		Pts: Tsai P-c. 19; Rebs: Tsai P-c. 7 Asts: Tsai P-c. 3

Bangkok Youth Centre, Bangkok
Referees: Arsen Andryushkin (KAZ), Ferdinand Pascual (PHI), Ceciline Vincent (IND)

=== Third place game ===
3 November 2013
16:00

Boxscore

China	61–53	Chinese Taipei
Scoring by quarter: 11–11, 19–15, 16–15, 15–12
Pts: Gao 22; Rebs: Lu, Gao 6 Asts: Lu 3		Pts: Huang P-j. 14; Rebs: Huang P-j. 7 Asts: Chen Y-f. 4

Bangkok Youth Centre, Bangkok
Referees: Kim Bo-Hui (KOR), Harja Jaladri (INA), Yevgeniy Mikheyev (KAZ)

=== Final ===
3 November 2013
18:00

Boxscore

South Korea	43–65	Japan
Scoring by quarter: 11–19, 5–18, 18–11, 9–17
Pts: Beon Y-H. 12; Rebs: Sin J-J. 6 Asts: Kim D-B., Park H-J. 2		Pts: Tokashiki 20; Rebs: Tokashiki 18; Asts: Yoshida 6

Bangkok Youth Centre, Bangkok
Referees: Snehal Bendke (IND), Lim Sok Hoon (MAS), Ferdinand Pascual (PHI)

== Final standing ==
Qualified for the 2014 FIBA World Championship for Women

Rank	Team	Record
1st place, gold medalist(s)	Japan	7–0
2nd place, silver medalist(s)	South Korea	4–3
3rd place, bronze medalist(s)	China	4–3
4	Chinese Taipei	3–4
5	India	2–4
6	Kazakhstan	0–6
7	Thailand	5–1
8	Malaysia	4–2
9	Indonesia	3–2
10	Philippines	3–2
11	Uzbekistan	1–4
12	Hong Kong	0–5

== Awards ==
2013 Asian champions

Japan
Second title

- Most Valuable Player: (Japan) Ramu Tokashiki

All-Star Team:

- PG – (Japan) Asami Yoshida
- SG – (South Korea) Beon Yeon-Ha
- SF – (China) Lu Wen
- PF – (Japan) Yuka Mamiya
- C – (Japan) Ramu Tokashiki
