= Eneos Sunflowers =

Eneos Sunflowers ENEOSサンフラワーズ
- League: Women's Japan Basketball League
- Founded: 1969
- History: Kyodo Oil Sunflowers; Nikkokyoseki Sunflowers; Japan Energy Sunflowers; Japan Energy Jomo Sunflowers; Jomo Sunflowers; JX Sunflowers; JX-Eneos Sunflowers; Eneos Sunflowers
- Arena: Kashiwa Central Gymnasium
- Location: Kashiwa, Chiba
- Head coach: Tim Lewis (basketball)
- Ownership: JXTG Holdings
- Championships: 22
- Website: www.eneos.jp/sunflowers/
Uniform	Uniform	Third

The Eneos Sunflowers (ENEOSサンフラワーズ, ENEOS Sanfurawāzu) are a Japanese professional basketball team based in Kashiwa, Chiba. The Sunflowers compete in the "Premier" first division of the Women's Japan Basketball League (WJBL).

== Notable players ==
- Clarissa Davis
- Manami Fujioka
- Mikiko Hagiwara
- Saki Hayashi
- Hiromi Kawabata
- Noriko Koiso
- Mari Konno
- Kaori Kusuda
- Yuka Mamiya
- Katrina McClain Johnson
- Yuki Miyazawa
- Yuko Oga
- Taeko Oyama
- Masami Tachikawa
- Ramu Tokashiki
- Ryoko Yano
- Asami Yoshida (basketball)

== Head coaches ==
- Kazuo Nakamura (basketball)
- Tomohide Utsumi
- Kiyomi Sato
- Tom Hovasse
- Eiki Umezaki

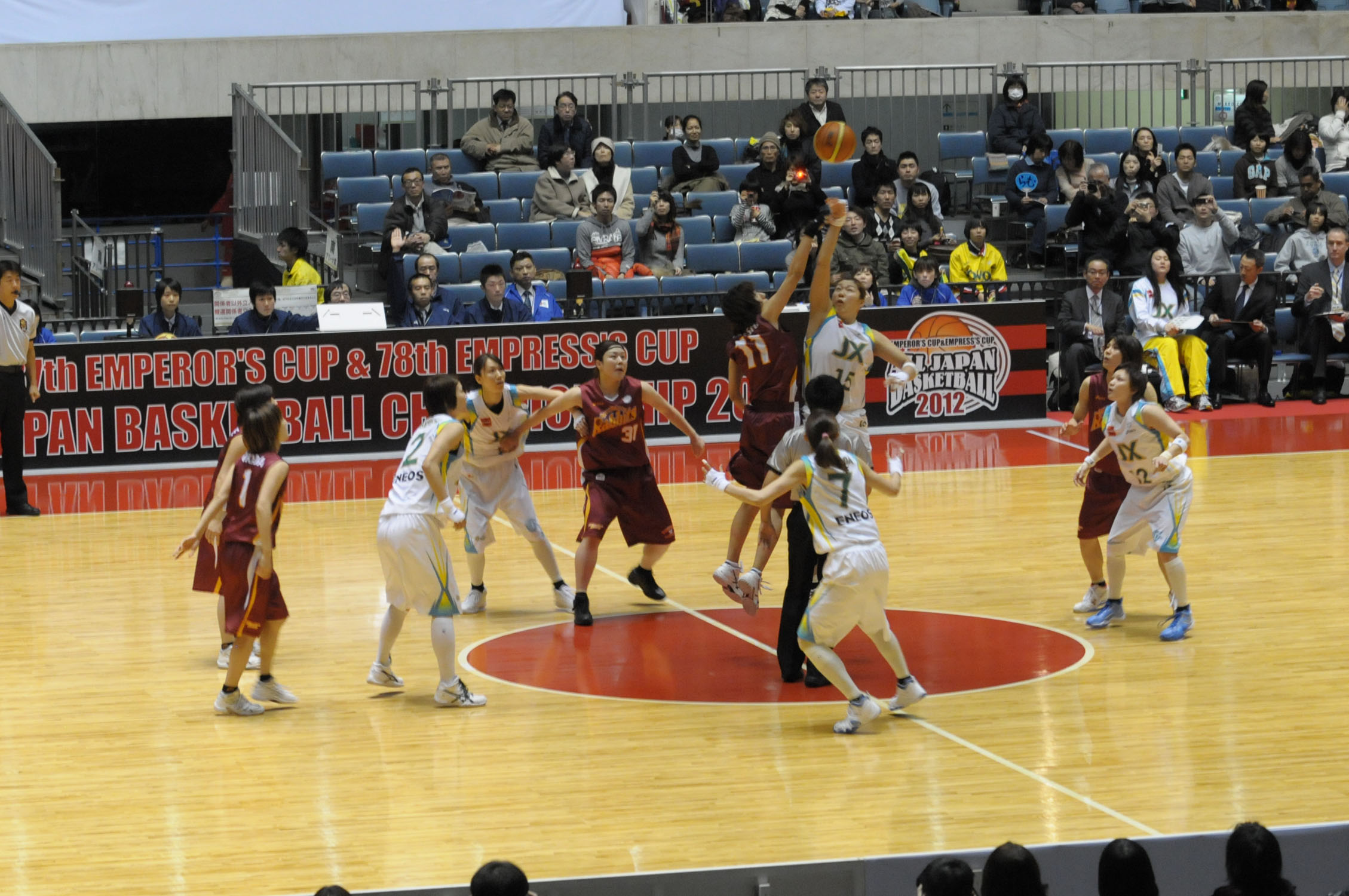
Sunflowers
