= Asami Yoshida (basketball) =

Japanese basketball player

Asami Yoshida 吉田 亜沙美
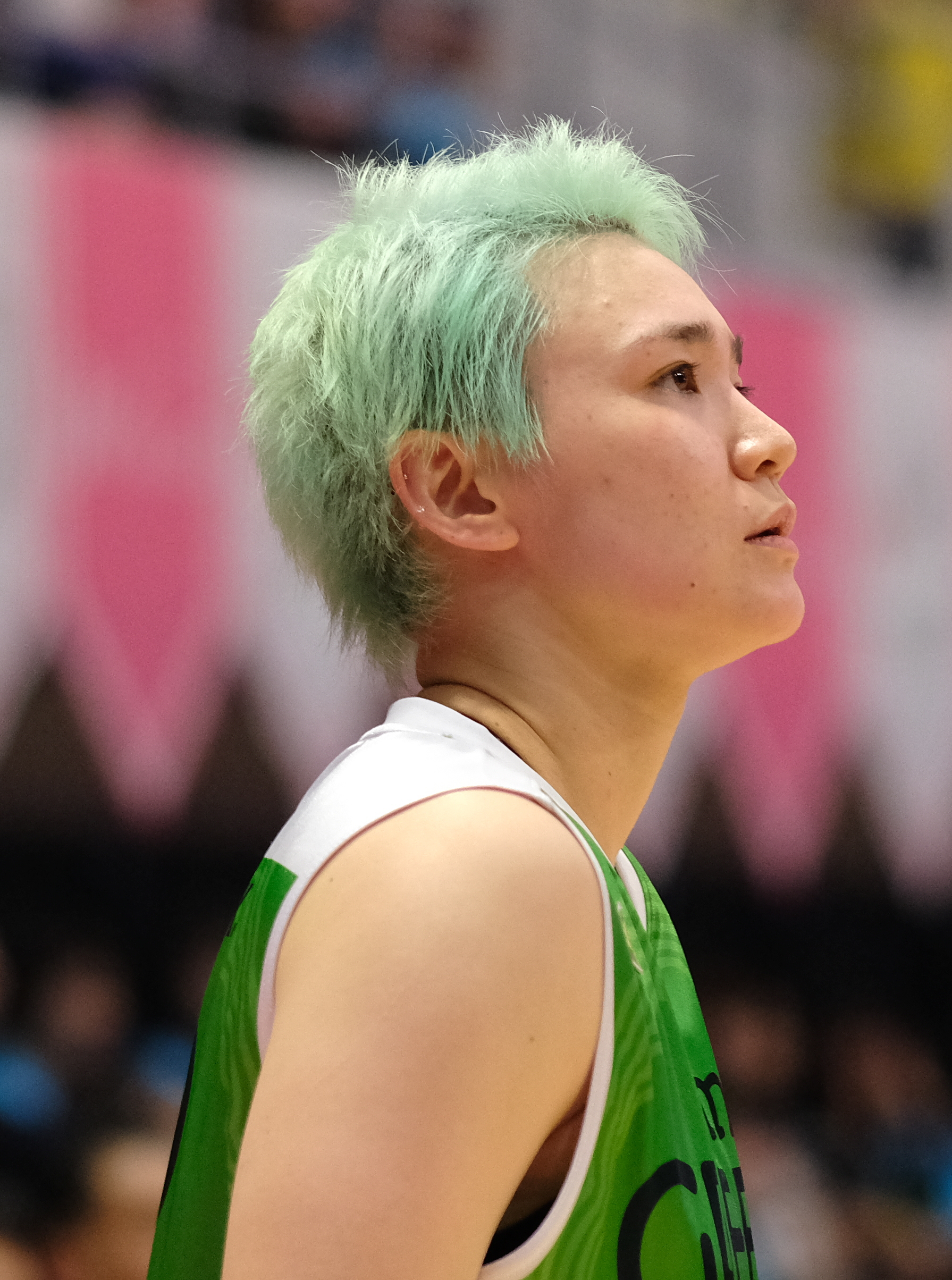

No. 12 – JX-Eneos Sunflowers
- Position: Guard
- League: JBL

Personal information
- Born: October 9, 1987 (age 39) Tokyo, Japan
- Listed height: 5 ft 5 in (1.65 m)

Career information
- Playing career: 2006–present

Career history
- 2006–present: JX-Eneos Sunflowers

Career highlights
- 2× FIBA Asia All-Tournament Team (2013, 2015); 9× WJBL champion (2007, 2009–2016); 2× WJBL Playoff Most Valuable Player (2009, 2012); 4× WJBL Best 5 (2012, 2013, 2014, 2016); WJBL Most Valuable Player (2012); 2010 FIBA World Championship for Women Assist Leader; WJBL Rookie of the Year (2007)
Medals
Women's basketball
Representing Japan
Asian Games
Bronze medal – third place	2006 Doha	Team
Bronze medal – third place	2010 Guangzhou	Team
FIBA Asia Cup
Gold medal – first place	2013 Thailand
Gold medal – first place	2015 China
Gold medal – first place	2017 India
Bronze medal – third place	2007 South Korea
Bronze medal – third place	2009 India
Bronze medal – third place	2011 Japan

Asami Yoshida (吉田 亜沙美 born October 9, 1987) is a Japanese professional basketball player for the JX-Eneos Sunflowers of the Women's Japan Basketball League (WJBL).

== Career ==
=== WJBL ===
Yoshida has played for the JX-Eneos Sunflowers, a team based in Kashiwa, since their 2006–07 season where she made her professional debut. In her opening season, she led the Sunflowers to a championship as well as taking home Rookie of the Year. She has enjoyed much success in this league and has led the Sunflowers to another eight championship titles. She has won the league Most Valuable Player award on two occasions, as well as being named to the Best 5, four times.

=== National team ===
Yoshida has been a consistent member of the Japanese national team since 2007. Since then, the Japanese team has medalled at each FIBA Asia Championship. She was named to the FIBA Asia All-Tournament Team in 2013 and 2015, also winning the Championship on both occasions. She made her Olympic debut at the 2016 Summer Olympics in Rio de Janeiro, Brazil.
