= Ramu Tokashiki =

Japanese basketball player (born 1991)

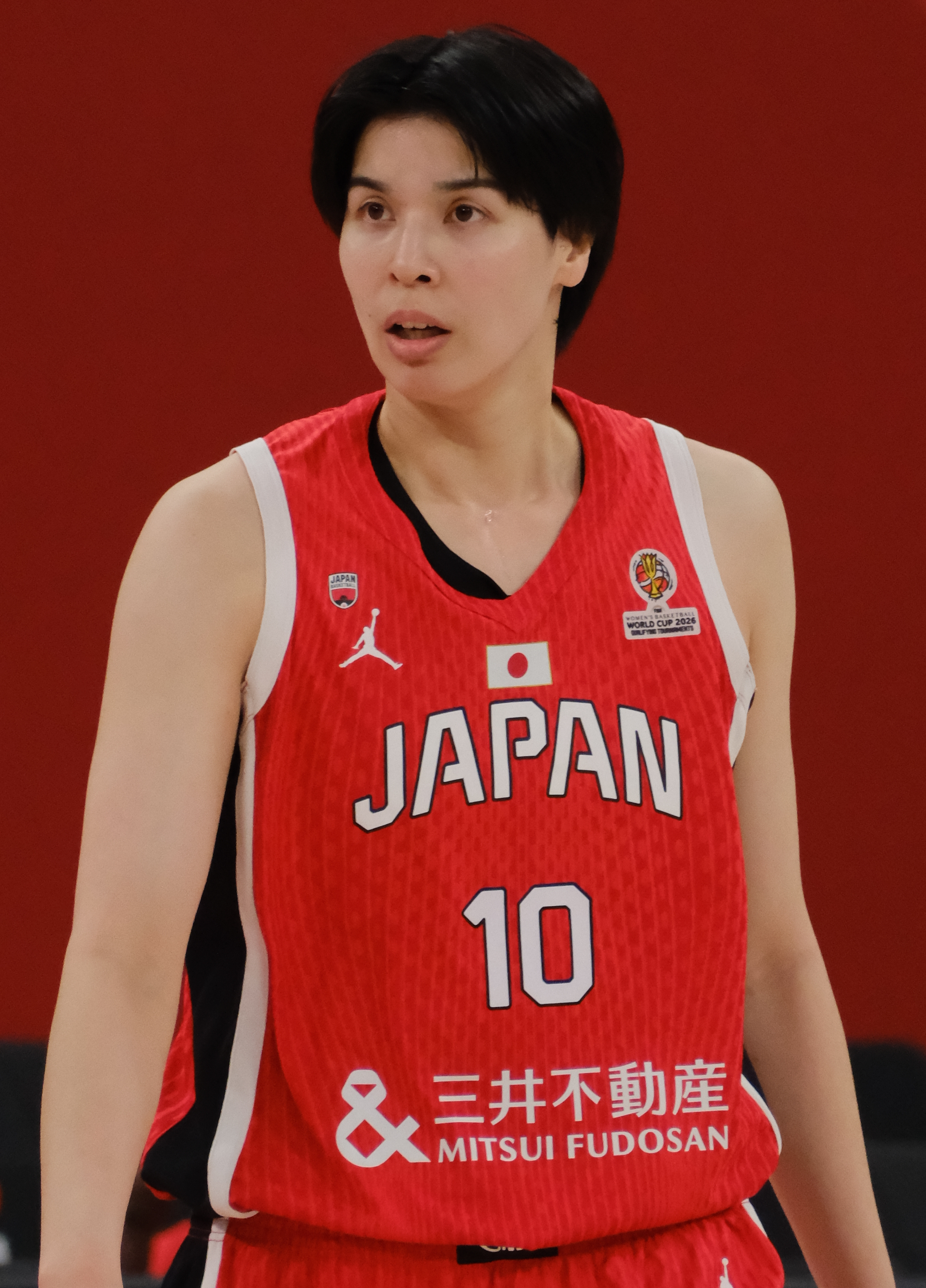
- Tokashiki in 2026

No. 10 – JX-Eneos Sunflowers
- Position: Power forward
- League: WJBL

Personal information
- Born: June 11, 1991 (age 35) Kita-ku, Tokyo, Japan
- Listed height: 6 ft 4 in (1.93 m)
- Listed weight: 176 lb (80 kg)

Career information
- Playing career: 2010–present

Career history
- 2010–present: JX-Eneos Sunflowers
- 2015–2017: Seattle Storm

Career highlights
- WNBA All-Rookie Team (2015); 2× FIBA Asia Championship MVP (2013, 2015); 5× WJBL champion (2011–2015); 2× WJBL MVP (2011, 2015); 2× WJBL Playoff MVP (2014, 2015); 4× WJBL Best 5 (2011, 2013–2015); WJBL Rookie of the Year (2011)
- Stats at Basketball Reference
Medals
Women's basketball
Representing Japan
Asia Cup
Gold medal – first place	2013 Bangkok
Gold medal – first place	2015 Wuhan
Gold medal – first place	2019 Bangalore
Silver medal – second place	2025 China
Bronze medal – third place	2011 Omura
FIBA Asia Under-18 Championship for Women
Gold medal – first place	2008 Medan	Japan U18
East Asian Games
Silver medal – second place	2013 Tianjin

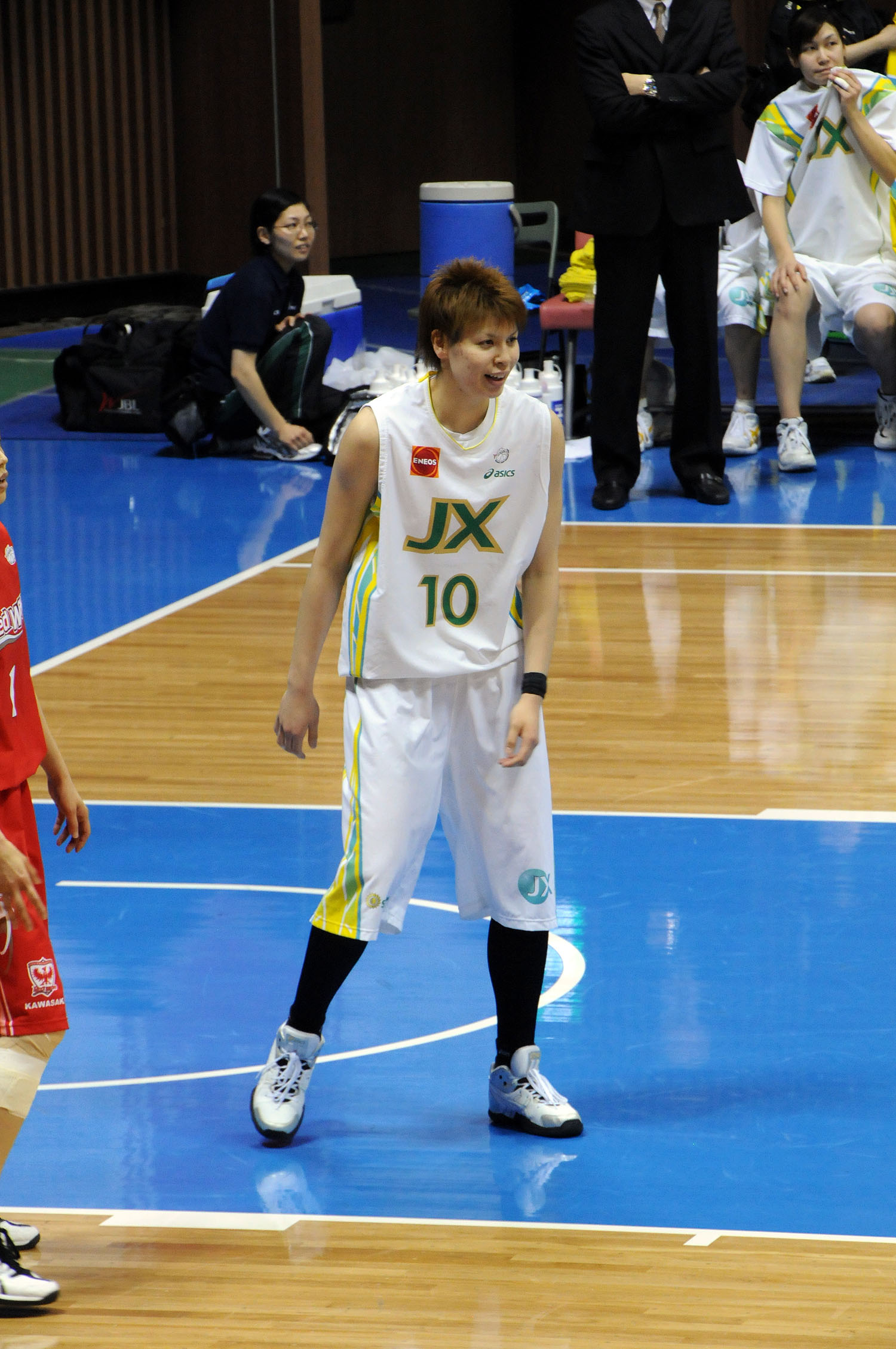

Ramu Tokashiki (渡嘉敷来夢, Tokashiki Ramu; born June 11, 1991) is a Japanese professional basketball player for the JX-Eneos Sunflowers of the Women's Japan Basketball League (WJBL).

== Professional career ==
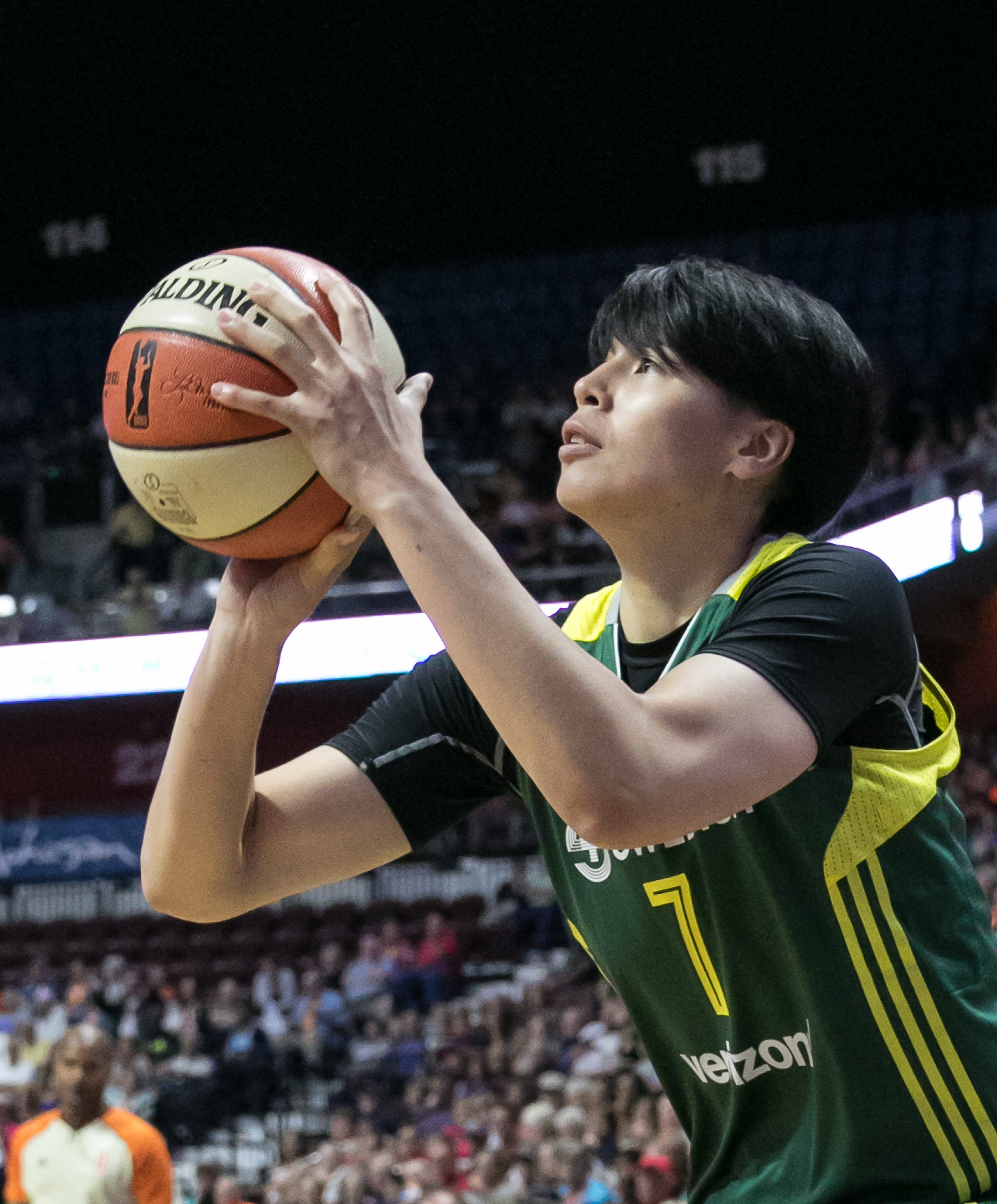
Ramu Tokashiki playing for the Seattle Storm in 2017

=== WJBL ===
Tokashiki has played for the JX-Eneos Sunflowers, a team based in Kashiwa, since their 2010–11 season where she made her professional debut. In her opening season she led the Sunflowers to a championship as well as taking home Rookie of the Year, a place on the Best 5 team and the MVP award. She has enjoyed much success in this league and has led the Sunflowers to a championship each year since her debut.

=== WNBA ===
Tokashiki was signed by the Seattle Storm for the 2015 WNBA season. In her first year with the Storm, she made the WNBA All-Rookie Team. Tokashiki signed a multiyear deal with the Storm in 2016. She played with the Storm during the 2016 and 2017 seasons, but missed the 2018 season to focus on preparing for the 2018 FIBA Women's World Cup with the Japanese national team. Tokashiki has not played in the league since the 2017 season.

== International career ==
Tokashiki was chosen as the national athlete for in 2011, and in that year she participated in the 2011 FIBA Asia Championship for Women. She got FIBA Asia Championship MVP in 2013 and 2015, also winning the Championship on both occasions. She made her Olympic debut at the 2016 Summer Olympics in Rio de Janeiro, Brazil.

== Career statistics ==
Legend
GP	Games played	GS	Games started	MPG	Minutes per game	RPG	Rebounds per game
APG	Assists per game	SPG	Steals per game	BPG	Blocks per game	PPG	Points per game
TO	Turnovers per game	FG%	Field-goal percentage	3P%	3-point field-goal percentage	FT%	Free-throw percentage
**Bold**	Career best	°	League leader

=== WNBA ===
==== Regular season ====
WNBA regular season statistics
Year	Team	GP	GS	MPG	FG%	3P%	FT%	RPG	APG	SPG	BPG	TO	PPG
2015	Seattle	30	**16**	**20.6**	.415	.000	**.862**	**3.3**	**0.8**	0.2	**0.9**	0.9	**8.2**
2016	Seattle	31	1	13.0	**.472**	.000	.818	2.5	0.3	**0.5**	0.1	**0.8**	5.3
2017	Seattle	**33**	1	12.5	.442	.000	.815	1.6	0.6	0.3	0.3	**0.8**	3.2
**Career**	3 years, 1 team	94	18	15.2	.437	.000	.836	2.4	0.6	0.3	0.4	0.8	5.5

==== Playoffs ====
WNBA playoff statistics
Year	Team	GP	GS	MPG	FG%	3P%	FT%	RPG	APG	SPG	BPG	TO	PPG
2016	Seattle	1	0	**20.0**	**.167**	.000	**.750**	**4.0**	**1.0**	0.0	0.0	**0.0**	**5.0**
2017	Seattle	1	0	7.0	—	—	—	0.0	0.0	0.0	0.0	**0.0**	0.0
**Career**	2 years, 1 team	2	0	13.5	.167	.000	.750	2.0	0.5	0.0	0.0	0.0	2.5
