= Wu I-ding =

Taiwanese politician

Wu I-ding MLY
- 吳怡玎
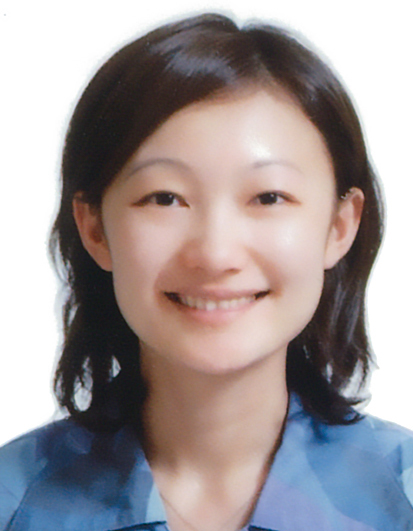

Member of the Legislative Yuan
- In office 1 February 2020 – 31 January 2024
- Constituency: Republic of China

Personal details
- Born: 13 November 1979 (age 46) Kaohsiung, Taiwan
- Party: Kuomintang
- Education: National Taiwan University (BA); University of Southampton (MSc); Imperial College London (PhD)

Wu I-ding (Chinese: 吳怡玎; born 13 November 1979) is a Taiwanese statistician and politician. She was a member of the Legislative Yuan from 2020 to 2024.

== Early life and education ==
Wu was born on 13 November 1979, and raised in Kaohsiung. She graduated from National Taiwan University with a bachelor's degree in business administration in 2001. She then completed graduate studies in England, earning a Master of Science (M.Sc.) in operations research and finance with distinction from the University of Southampton in 2003 and her Ph.D. in statistics from Imperial College London in 2008. Her doctoral dissertation was titled, "The non-ignorable missing-data problem in consumer banking".

== Political career ==
Wu was placed on the Kuomintang party list in the 2020 legislative elections as a representative of the youth vote. Ranked ninth on the list, she was elected to the Legislative Yuan.

She questioned the extension of tenure granted to the Transitional Justice Commission in April 2020.

In March 2020, Wu was elected to the Kuomintang Central Standing Committee.
