= Sanae Motokawa =

Japanese basketball player

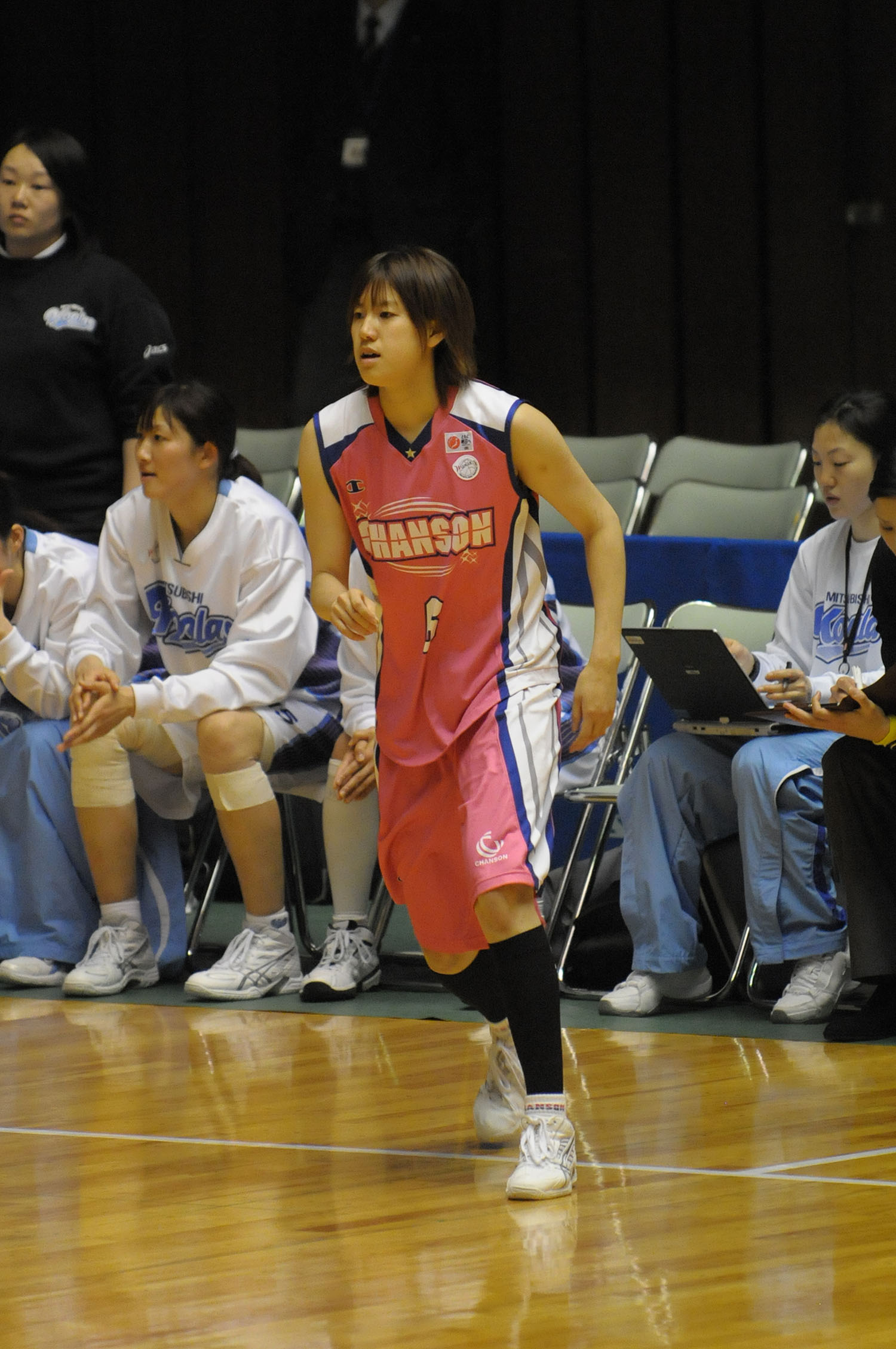

Chanson V-Magic
- Position: Forward
- League: JBL

Personal information
- Born: April 2, 1992 (age 34)
- Listed height: 5 ft 9 in (1.75 m)
Medals
Women's basketball
Representing Japan
FIBA Asia Cup
Gold medal – first place	2015 Wuhan	Japan
Gold medal – first place	2019 India
Asian Games
Bronze medal – third place	2014 Incheon	Team

Sanae Motokawa (本川紗奈生, Motokawa Sanae, born April 2, 1992) is a Japanese basketball player. She represented Japan in the women's tournament at the 2016 Summer Olympics.
