= Asako O =

Japanese basketball player

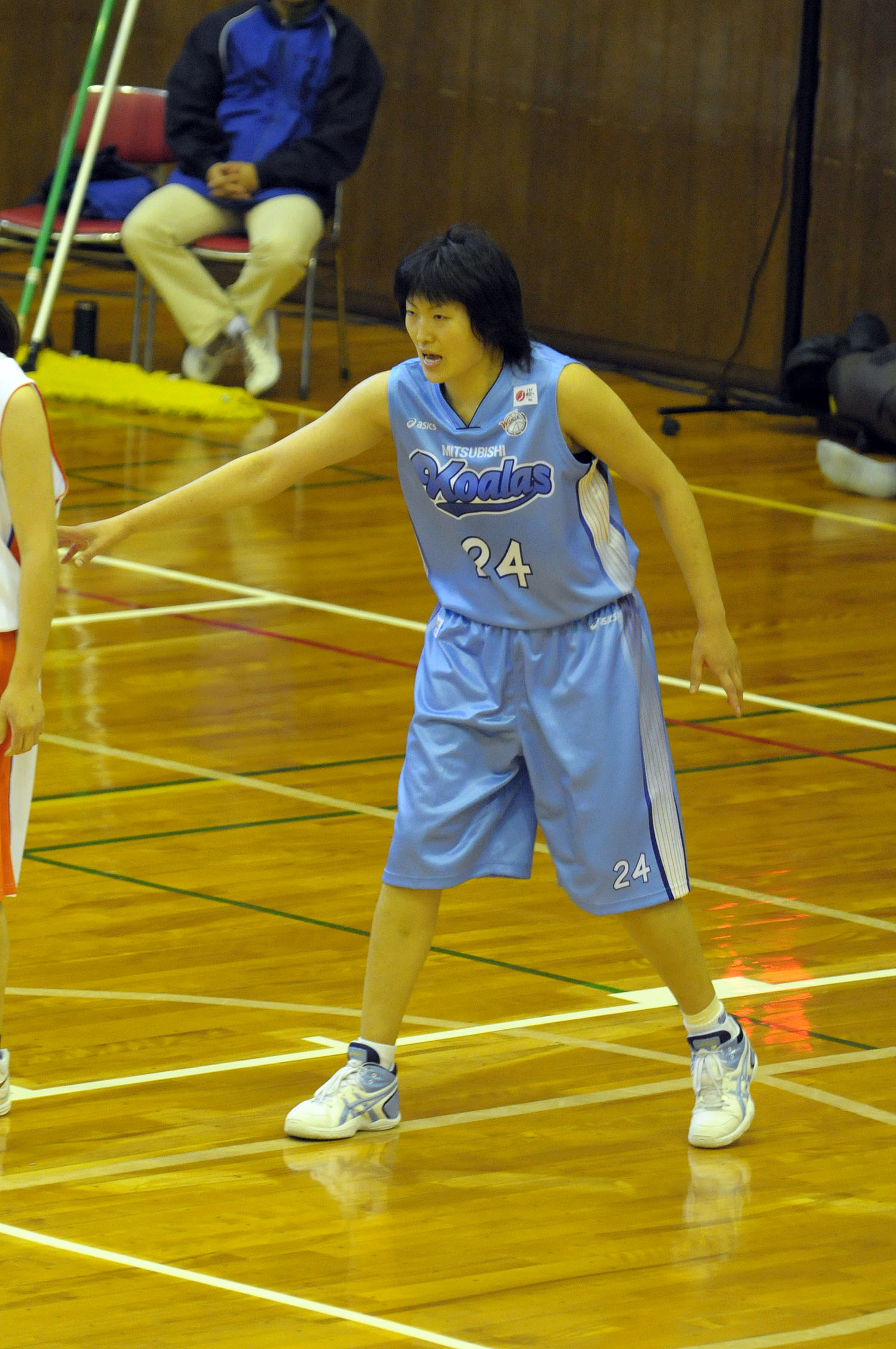

Personal information
- Born: December 16, 1987 (age 38) Tianjin, China
- Listed height: 6 ft 2 in (1.88 m)
- Position: Center
Medals
Women's basketball
Representing Japan
FIBA Asia Cup
Gold medal – first place	2013 Bangkok	Japan
Gold medal – first place	2015 Wuhan	Japan

Asako O (王 新朝喜, Ō Asako; born December 16, 1987), born Wang Cenjing (Chinese: 王岑静; pinyin: Wáng Cénjìng), is a Chinese-born Japanese basketball player. She became a naturalized Japanese citizen in 2013 and represented Japan in the basketball competition at the 2016 Summer Olympics.
