= Gao Song (basketball) =

Chinese basketball player

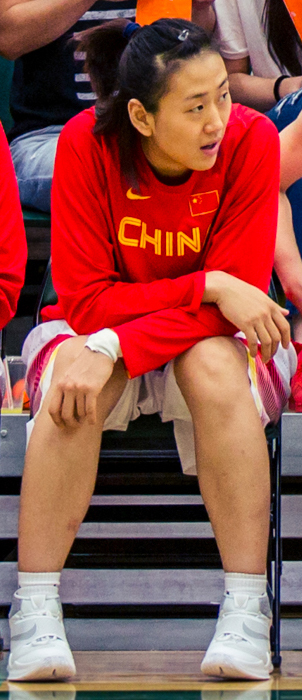
- Gao Song in 2016

No. 12 – Sichuan Yuanda
- Position: Power forward
- League: WCBA

Personal information
- Born: April 16, 1992 (age 34) Daqing, Heilongjiang, China
- Listed height: 6 ft 3 in (1.91 m)

Career information
- Playing career: 2007–present

Career history
- 2007–2013: Heilongjiang Dragons
- 2013–2015: Zhejiang Chouzhou Bank
- 2015: Guangdong Dolphins
- 2015–2020: Beijing Shougang
- 2020–present: Sichuan Yuanda

Gao Song (Chinese: 高颂; pinyin: Gāo Sòng; born April 16, 1992) is a basketball player for China women's national basketball team. She was part of the squad for the 2012 and 2016 Summer Olympics. She was part of the Chinese team that won the 2011 FIBA Asian Women's Championship, as well as competing in 2 more Asian Women's Championships.

She was part of the Sichuan Yuanda Meile team that won the FIBA WBL Asia title in 2024.
