= Park Hye-jin (basketball) =

South Korean basketball player

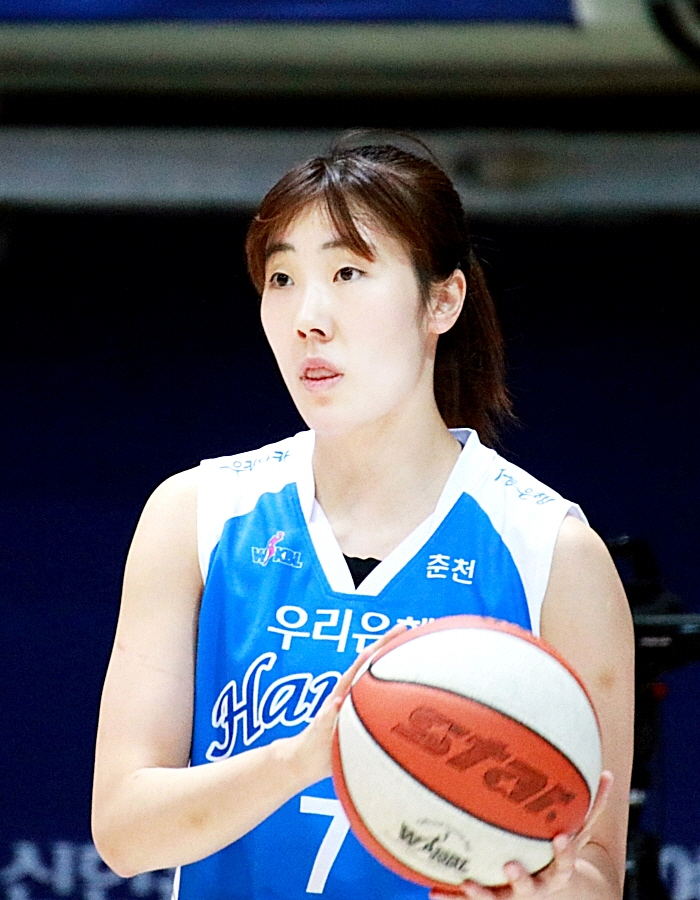

No. 7 – Asan Woori Bank Wibee
- Position: Guard
- League: WKBL

Personal information
- Born: 22 July 1990 (age 36) Busan, South Korea
- Listed height: 5 ft 10 in (1.78 m)
- Listed weight: 143 lb (65 kg)

Career information
- WNBA draft: 2012: undrafted
Medals
Women's basketball
Representing Korea
Asian Games
Silver medal – second place	2018 Jakarta	Team

Park Hye-jin (born 22 July 1990) is a South Korean basketball player for Asan Woori Bank Wibee and the South Korean national team.

She participated at the 2018 FIBA Women's Basketball World Cup.
