= Yuka Mamiya =

Japanese basketball player

Yuka Osaki
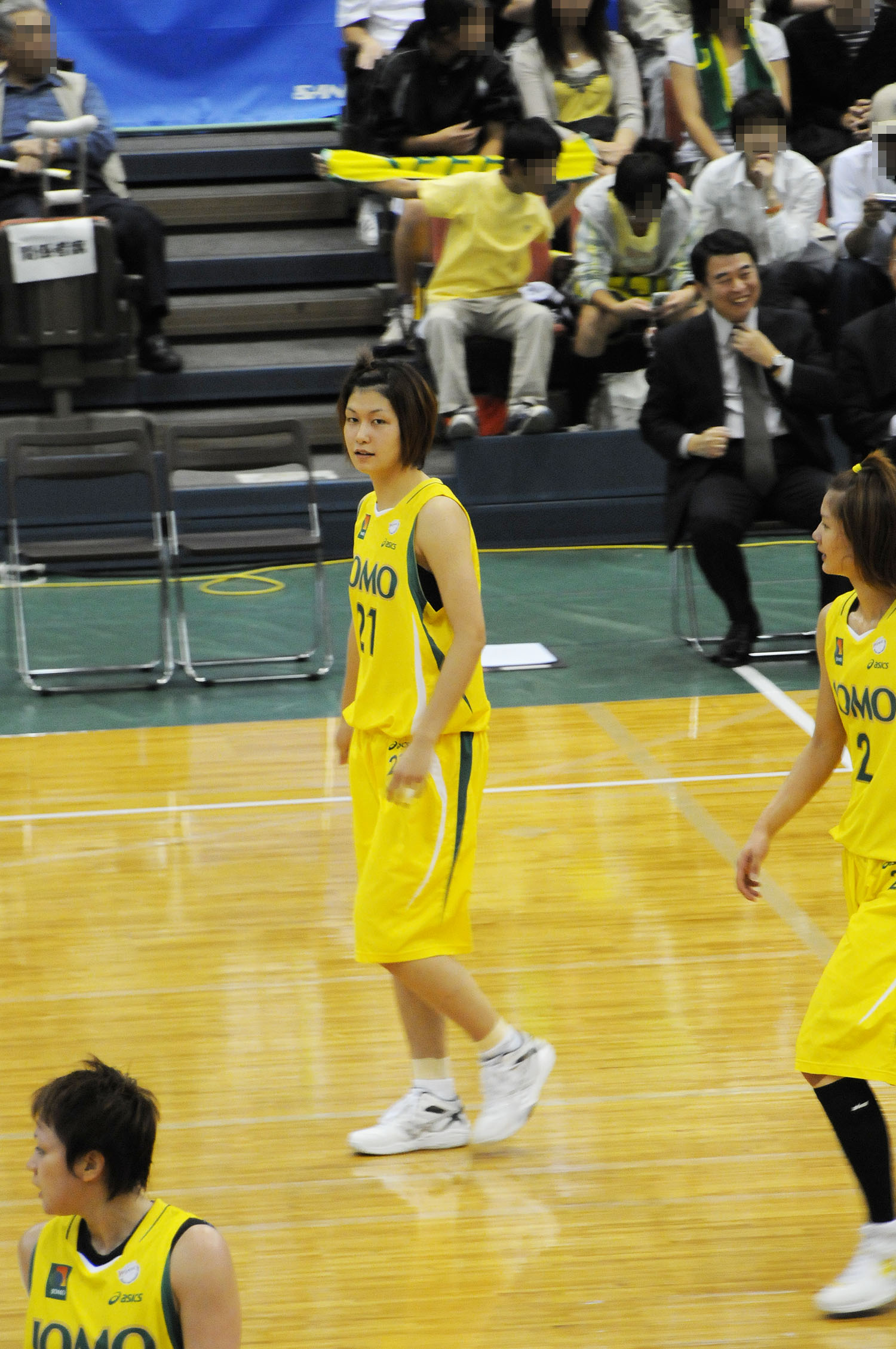
- Yuka Mamiya playing for JOMO Sunflowers in 2009

JX-Eneos Sunflowers
- Position: Small forward
- League: JBL

Personal information
- Born: April 3, 1990 (age 36)
- Listed height: 6 ft 1 in (1.85 m)
Medals
Women's basketball
Representing Japan
FIBA Asia Cup
Gold medal – first place	2015 Wuhan	Japan
Gold medal – first place	2017 India
Asian Games
Bronze medal – third place	2010 Guangzhou	Team

Yuka Osaki (大崎 佑圭, Osaki Yuka; born April 3, 1990), née Yuka Mamiya (間宮 佑圭, Mamiya Yuka), is a Japanese basketball player. She represented Japan in the basketball competition at the 2016 Summer Olympics.
