= 2025 FIBA Women's Asia Cup =

Tournament details
- Host country: China
- City: Shenzhen
- Dates: 13–20 July
- Teams: 16 (from 1 confederation)
- Venues: 2

Final positions
- Champions: Australia (1st title)
- Runners-up: Japan
- Third place: China
- Fourth place: South Korea

Tournament statistics
- Games played: 20
- Attendance: 43,349 (2,167 per game)
- MVP: (Australia) Alexandra Fowler
- Top scorer: (Lebanon) Rebecca Akl (16.5 ppg)

Official website
- 2025 FIBA Women's Asia Cup Division A 2025 FIBA Women's Asia Cup Division B

The 2025 FIBA Women's Asia Cup was the 31st edition of the tournament, held from 13 to 20 July 2025 in Shenzhen, China.

The winner qualified for the 2026 FIBA Women's Basketball World Cup and the top six teams (including the winner) will qualify for one of the qualifying tournaments for the 2026 World Cup.

Hosts China were the defending champions, but failed to defend their title after losing in the semifinals to Japan.

Australia won their first title with a final win over Japan. As the winner, Australia qualified for the 2026 FIBA Women's Basketball World Cup, while Japan, China, South Korea, New Zealand and Philippines qualified for the qualifying tournaments for the said World Cup.

== Venues ==
All Division A games were held at Shenzhen Arena. All Division B games were held at a secondary arena nearby.

2025 FIBA Women's Asia Cup venues
Shenzhen	2025 FIBA Women's Asia Cup is located in China
Shenzhen Arena	2025 FIBA Women's Asia Cup is located in China
Capacity: 16,000	2025 FIBA Women's Asia Cup is located in China
Shenzhen Sports Center Gymnasium	2025 FIBA Women's Asia Cup is located in China
Capacity: 2,400	2025 FIBA Women's Asia Cup is located in China

== Format ==
There were two divisions, with identical tournament formats. Division A determined the champion.

The eight teams were split into two groups of four teams. The first-placed team qualified to the semifinals while the second-and third-placed teams played in a playoff round. The second-placed teams faced off against the third-placed teams. A knockout-system was after the preliminary round with the losing teams playing in a classification game.

In Division A, the fourth-placed teams played in a relegation playoff to determine which team participated in Division A on the next tournament; the loser was relegated to Division B. In Division B, the winner of the final was promoted to Division A.

== Qualified teams ==
Map of qualified teams for the 2025 FIBA Women's Asia Cup

Alongside hosts China, every other team who finished in the top seven of the 2023 edition retained their place in Division A. Joining them were the winners of the Division B, Indonesia, who took part in Division A for the first time since divisions were created. For the first time since 1984, Chinese Taipei was not playing at an Asia Cup after being relegated to Division B. For the first time ever, Lebanon participated in Division A consecutively.

Division A
Qualification	Host	Dates	Vacancies	Qualified
Host	(China) Shenzhen	4 March 2024	1	China
Positions 2–7 at 2023 FIBA Asia Cup	(Australia) Sydney	26 June – 2 July 2023	6	Japan; Australia; New Zealand; South Korea; Philippines; Lebanon
Winner of Division B	(Thailand) Bangkok	13–19 August 2023	1	Indonesia

Division B
Qualification	Host	Dates	Vacancies	Qualified
SABA Qualifiers	(India) New Delhi	23–26 February 2025	1	India
CABA Qualifiers	(Kazakhstan) Turkistan	28–30 March 2025	1	Kazakhstan
EABA Qualifiers	(Mongolia) Ulaanbaatar	11–13 April 2025	1	Chinese Taipei
WABA Qualifiers	(Jordan) Amman	15–17 April 2025	1	Iran
Oceania representatives	—N/a	23 April 2025	2	Cook Islands; Tahiti
Wild Card	—N/a	23 April 2025	2	Mongolia; Thailand

=== Summary of qualified teams ===
Team	Qualification method	Appearance(s)				Previous best performance (Note: Bold text indicates they hosted that edition.)	WR (Note: World ranking at start of tournament.)
Team	Qualification method	Total (Note: In Division A. Results in Division B are excluded.)	First	Last	Streak	Previous best performance	WR
China	First in 2023 and hosts	25th	1976	2023	25	Champions (Twelve times) (Note: China have won in 1976, 1986, 1990, 1992, 1994, 1995, 2001, 2004, 2005, 2009, 2011 and 2023.)	4
Japan	Second in 2023	29th	1965	2023	26	Champions (1970, 2013, 2015, 2017, 2019, 2021)	10
Australia	Third in 2023	5th	2017	2023	5	Runners-up (2017)	2
New Zealand	Fourth in 2023	5th	2017	2023	5	Fourth place (2023)	26
South Korea	Fifth in 2023	31st	1965	2023	31	Champions (Twelve times) (Note: South Korea have won in 1965, 1968, 1974, 1978, 1980, 1982, 1984, 1988, 1997, 1999 and 2007.)	14
Philippines	Sixth in 2023	11th	1965	2023	5	Fourth place (1965, 1984)	39
Lebanon	Seventh in 2023	3rd	2011	2023	2	Fifth place (2011)	49
Indonesia	Winner of Division B	13th	1970	1986	1	Fourth place (1972)	52

== Squads ==
Each nation had to submit a list of 12 players.

== Division A ==
=== Preliminary round ===
All times are local (UTC+8).

==== Group A ====
Pos	Team	Pld	W	L	PF	PA	PD	Pts	Qualification
1	China (H)	3	3	0	286	179	+107	6	Semifinals
2	South Korea	3	2	1	242	229	+13	5	Playoffs
3	New Zealand	3	1	2	202	208	−6	4	Playoffs
4	Indonesia	3	0	3	166	280	−114	3	Seventh place game

Source: FIBA
Rules for classification: 1) Points; 2) Head-to-head results; 3) Points difference; 4) Points scored.
(H) Hosts

13 July 2025
19:30

Boxscore

China	110–59	Indonesia
Scoring by quarter: 28–8, 21–12, 37–19, 24–20
Pts: three players 13; Rebs: Luo 6 Asts: three players 4		Pts: Pierre-Louis 16; Rebs: Pierre-Louis 6 Asts: Retong 5

Shenzhen Arena, Shenzhen
Attendance: 5,000
Referees: Scott Beker (AUS), Jennifer Ammoury (LBN), Chan Owe Shiong (MAS)

14 July 2025
13:30

Boxscore

New Zealand	74–76	South Korea
Scoring by quarter: 19–24, 19–22, 15–18, 23–14
Pts: Shearer 22; Rebs: Tamilo 8 Asts: Hokianga 5		Pts: Choi 23; Rebs: Park Ji-h. 7 Asts: Heo 7

Shenzhen Arena, Shenzhen
Attendance: 260
Referees: Yana Nikogossyan (KAZ), Issam Al-Siyabi (OMA), Taha Al-Hashedi (YEM)

15 July 2025
13:30

Boxscore

Indonesia	45–75	New Zealand
Scoring by quarter: 14–21, 12–17, 9–20, 10–17
Pts: Pierre-Louis 11; Rebs: Kusuma 7 Asts: Retong 4		Pts: McGoldrick 18; Rebs: Pizzey 13; Asts: Dale 4

Shenzhen Arena, Shenzhen
Attendance: 260
Referees: Taha Al-Hashedi (YEM), Samaneh Deghani (IRI), Rakesh Ramalingaiah (IND)

15 July 2025
19:30

Boxscore

South Korea	69–91	China
Scoring by quarter: 13–16, 16–20, 20–30, 20–25
Pts: Choi 16; Rebs: Choi 7 Asts: An 6		Pts: Han, Zhang Z. 18; Rebs: Han 12; Asts: Wang, Yang L. 8

Shenzhen Arena, Shenzhen
Attendance: 8,500
Referees: Issam Al-Siyabi (OMA), Preeda Muongmee (THA), Leong Chuen Wing (SGP)

16 July 2025
16:30

Boxscore

South Korea	95–62	Indonesia
Scoring by quarter: 25–22, 23–12, 24–14, 23–14
Pts: Park Ji-h. 18; Rebs: Lee H. 8 Asts: Heo, Park Ji-h. 7		Pts: Pierre-Louis 16; Rebs: Pierre-Louis 7 Asts: three players 3

Shenzhen Arena, Shenzhen
Attendance: 210
Referees: Taha Al-Hashedi (YEM), Bandar Al-Suwaidi (QAT), Rakesh Ramalingaiah (IND)

16 July 2025
19:30

Boxscore

China	85–51	New Zealand
Scoring by quarter: 25–10, 17–13, 24–15, 19–13
Pts: Yang S., Zhang Z. 12; Rebs: Huang 6 Asts: Wang 7		Pts: Whittaker 10; Rebs: Tofaeono 10; Asts: Dalton 4

Shenzhen Arena, Shenzhen
Attendance: 5,000
Referees: Yana Nikogossyan (KAZ), Preeda Muongmee (THA), Chan Owe Shiong (MAS)

==== Group B ====
Pos	Team	Pld	W	L	PF	PA	PD	Pts	Qualification
1	Australia	3	3	0	307	140	+167	6	Semifinals
2	Japan	3	2	1	224	229	−5	5	Playoffs
3	Philippines	3	1	2	194	270	−76	4	Playoffs
4	Lebanon	3	0	3	172	258	−86	3	Seventh place game

Source: FIBA
Rules for classification: 1) Points; 2) Head-to-head results; 3) Points difference; 4) Points scored.

13 July 2025
13:30

Boxscore

Japan	72–68	Lebanon
Scoring by quarter: 16–26, 28–15, 12–9, 16–18
Pts: Yabu 19; Rebs: Mawuli, Takada 6 Asts: Mawuli 4		Pts: Akl 27; Rebs: Archer 12; Asts: Mansour 5

Shenzhen Arena, Shenzhen
Attendance: 1,568
Referees: Yana Nikogossyan (KAZ), Preeda Muongmee (THA), Taha Al-Hashedi (YEM)

13 July 2025
16:30

Boxscore

Australia	115–39	Philippines
Scoring by quarter: 31–14, 22–11, 34–12, 28–2
Pts: Sowah 19; Rebs: Bibby, George 10; Asts: Ellis, Reid 9		Pts: De Jesus 9 Rebs: Animam 5 Asts: Panganiban, Castillo 2

Shenzhen Arena, Shenzhen
Attendance: 1,876
Referees: Issam Al-Siyabi (OMA), Kim Bo-hui (KOR), Yuen Chun Yip (HKG)

14 July 2025
16:30

Boxscore

Lebanon	34–113	Australia
Scoring by quarter: 6–21, 11–28, 11–34, 6–30
Pts: Labban 11; Rebs: Naassan 7 Asts: Naassan, Raffoul 2		Pts: Bourne 15; Rebs: Bibby 12; Asts: Reid, Woods 7

Shenzhen Arena, Shenzhen
Attendance: 450
Referees: Yuen Chun Yip (HKG), Bandar Al-Suwaidi (QAT), Rakesh Ramalingaiah (IND)

14 July 2025
19:30

Boxscore

Philippines	82–85	Japan
Scoring by quarter: 20–31, 21–26, 16–20, 25–8
Pts: Animam 24; Rebs: Animam 14; Asts: De Jesus 6		Pts: Takada 20; Rebs: Miyazawa 8 Asts: Tanaka 7

Shenzhen Arena, Shenzhen
Attendance: 380
Referees: Preeda Muongmee (THA), Leong Chuen Wing (SGP), Chan Owe Shiong (MAS)

15 July 2025
16:30

Boxscore

Japan	67–79	Australia
Scoring by quarter: 22–26, 29–16, 8–17, 8–20
Pts: Mawuli 19; Rebs: Konno, Takada 6 Asts: Tanaka 5		Pts: Reid 15; Rebs: Aokuso 8 Asts: Reid 9

Shenzhen Arena, Shenzhen
Attendance: 850
Referees: Yuen Chun Yip (HKG), Yana Nikogossyan (KAZ), Bandar Al-Suwaidi (QAT)

16 July 2025
13:30

Boxscore

Philippines	73–70	Lebanon
Scoring by quarter: 29–12, 12–25, 14–20, 18–13
Pts: Panganiban 15; Rebs: Animam 16; Asts: Animam 5		Pts: Archer 23; Rebs: Archer 10; Asts: Akl 4

Shenzhen Arena, Shenzhen
Attendance: 220
Referees: Yuen Chun Yip (HKG), Issam Al-Siyabi (OMA), Leong Chuen Wing (SGP)

=== Knockout round ===
==== Bracket ====
Qualification to semifinals
18 July
Japan	77
New Zealand	62
18 July
South Korea	104
Philippines	71

Semifinals
19 July
China	81
Japan	90
19 July
Australia	86
South Korea	73
Fifth place
19 July
Philippines	71
New Zealand	78

Final
20 July
Japan	79
Australia	88
Third place
20 July
China	101
South Korea	66

==== Qualification to semifinals ====
18 July 2025
16:30

Boxscore

Japan	77–62	New Zealand
Scoring by quarter: 19–17, 20–24, 22–8, 16–13
Pts: Tanaka 17; Rebs: Miyazawa 10; Asts: Kawai 5		Pts: McGoldrick 28; Rebs: McGoldrick 12; Asts: three players 3

Shenzhen Arena, Shenzhen
Attendance: 350
Referees: Issam Al-Siyabi (OMA), Yuen Chun Yip (HKG), Jennifer Ammoury (LBN)

18 July 2025
19:30

Boxscore

South Korea	104–71	Philippines
Scoring by quarter: 30–16, 29–16, 19–17, 26–22
Pts: Lee H. 24; Rebs: Park Ji-h. 9 Asts: Heo 8		Pts: Panganiban 19; Rebs: Animam 7 Asts: three players 3

Shenzhen Arena, Shenzhen
Attendance: 480
Referees: Preeda Muongmee (THA), Taha Al-Hashedi (YEM), Chan Owe Shiong (MAS)

==== Semifinals ====
19 July 2025
16:30

Boxscore

Australia	86–73	South Korea
Scoring by quarter: 22–13, 20–25, 22–16, 22–19
Pts: George 20; Rebs: George 13; Asts: Reid 8		Pts: Heo 20; Rebs: three players 5 Asts: Shin 7

Shenzhen Arena, Shenzhen
Attendance: 1,900
Referees: Issam Al-Siyabi (OMA), Jennifer Ammoury (LBN), Bandar Al-Suwaidi (QAT)

19 July 2025
19:30

Boxscore

China	81–90	Japan
Scoring by quarter: 27–27, 24–22, 14–24, 16–17
Pts: Yang S. 19; Rebs: Zhang Z. 9 Asts: Yang L. 9		Pts: Tanaka 27; Rebs: Miyazawa 9 Asts: Miyazawa, Tanaka 5

Shenzhen Arena, Shenzhen
Attendance: 8,000
Referees: Preeda Muongmee (THA), Yana Nikogossyan (KAZ), Taha Al-Hashedi (YEM)

==== Seventh place game ====
The winner stayed in Division A, while the loser was relegated to Division B.

18 July 2025
13:30

Boxscore

Indonesia	57–67	Lebanon
Scoring by quarter: 12–18, 10–13, 16–23, 19–13
Pts: Pierre-Louis 16; Rebs: Pierre-Louis 11; Asts: Retong 8		Pts: Akl 26; Rebs: Archer 12; Asts: Akl 5

Shenzhen Arena, Shenzhen
Attendance: 125
Referees: Scott Beker (AUS), Yana Nikogossyan (KAZ), Jiang Wen'an (CHN)

==== Fifth place game ====
19 July 2025
13:30

Boxscore

Philippines	71–78	New Zealand
Scoring by quarter: 13–19, 25–23, 18–11, 15–25
Pts: De Jesus 16; Rebs: Animam 8 Asts: Animam, De Jesus 4		Pts: McGoldrick 17; Rebs: Pizzey, Tamilo 10; Asts: Dalton, Shearer 4

Shenzhen Arena, Shenzhen
Attendance: 220
Referees: Yu Yijing (CHN), Leong Chuen Wing (SGP), Rakesh Ramalingaiah (IND)

==== Third place game ====
20 July 2025
16:30

Boxscore

South Korea	66–101	China
Scoring by quarter: 14–31, 15–27, 19–26, 18–17
Pts: Park Ji-s. 14; Rebs: Park Ji-h. 8 Asts: An 8		Pts: Wang 19; Rebs: Wang, Zhang Z. 7 Asts: Wang 7

Shenzhen Arena, Shenzhen
Attendance: 4,200
Referees: Scott Beker (AUS), Ami Takano (JPN), Leong Chuen Wing (SGP)

==== Final ====
20 July 2025
19:30

Boxscore

Australia	88–79	Japan
Scoring by quarter: 29–20, 25–23, 13–16, 21–20
Pts: Fowler 15; Rebs: Aokuso 8 Asts: George 5		Pts: Tanaka 21; Rebs: Miyazawa 9 Asts: Tanaka 9

Shenzhen Arena, Shenzhen
Attendance: 3,500
Referees: Yana Nikogossyan (KAZ), Glenn Cornelio (PHI), Issam Al-Siyabi (OMA)

=== Statistics and awards ===
==== Statistical leaders ====
===== Players =====
Points

Name	PPG
(Lebanon) Rebecca Akl	16.5
(China) Zhang Ziyu	15.6
(New Zealand) Esra McGoldrick	15.0
(Japan) Kokoro Tanaka	14.8
(Indonesia) Kim Pierre-Louis	14.8
(China) Han Xu	14.8

Rebounds

Name	RPG
(Philippines) Jack Animam	10.0
(Lebanon) Jillian Archer	9.0
(Australia) Cayla George	8.4
(New Zealand) Rebecca Pizzey	7.6
(Japan) Yuki Miyazawa	7.3

Assists

Name	APG
(Australia) Stephanie Reid	7.4
(South Korea) Heo Ye-eun	6.3
(China) Yang Liwei	5.6
(Japan) Kokoro Tanaka	5.5
(South Korea) An He-ji	5.3

Blocks

Name	BPG
(Philippines) Quinn Dela Rosa	2.0
(New Zealand) Esra McGoldrick	1.6
(China) Han Xu	1.4
(Philippines) Jack Animam	1.2
(South Korea) Park Ji-su	1.0

Steals

Name	SPG
(Philippines) Jack Animam	2.6
(South Korea) Park Ji-hyun	2.2
(China) Luo Xinyu	2.0
(Indonesia) Agustin Retong
(Philippines) Sumayah Sugapong	1.6
(Philippines) Quinn Dela Rosa	1.6
(New Zealand) McKenna Dale	1.6

Efficiency

Name	EFFPG
(Australia) Alexandra Fowler	20.0
(China) Han Xu	18.8
(South Korea) Park Ji-hyun	17.2
(Japan) Yuki Miyazawa	17.0
(Australia) Stephanie Reid	16.4
(China) Zhang Ziyu	16.4

===== Teams =====
Points

Team	PPG
Australia	96.2
China	93.6
South Korea	80.8
Japan	78.3
New Zealand	68.4

Rebounds

Team	RPG
New Zealand	50.0
Australia	49.0
China	44.4
Lebanon	43.3
Japan	35.7

Assists

Team	APG
China	30.0
Australia	28.4
South Korea	27.5
New Zealand	20.0
Japan	19.7

Blocks

Team	BPG
New Zealand	5.4
Philippines	3.8
China	3.2
Japan	3.0
South Korea	1.8
Australia	1.8

Steals

Team	SPG
Australia	2.0
Philippines	1.9
China	1.7
South Korea	1.5
New Zealand	1.5
Indonesia	1.5

Efficiency

Team	EFFPG
Australia	131.4
China	122.2
South Korea	93.2
Japan	85.5
New Zealand	79.0

=== Awards ===
The awards were announced on 20 July 2025.

All-Tournament Team
Guards	Forward	Center
(Australia) Stephanie Reid (South Korea) Park Ji-hyun (Japan) Kokoro Tanaka	(Australia) Alexandra Fowler	(China) Han Xu
MVP: (Australia) Alexandra Fowler

== Division B ==
=== Preliminary round ===
All times are local (UTC+8)

==== Group A ====
Pos	Team	Pld	W	L	PF	PA	PD	Pts	Qualification
1	Chinese Taipei	3	3	0	296	124	+172	6	Semifinals
2	India	3	2	1	202	206	−4	5	Playoffs
3	Kazakhstan	3	1	2	184	225	−41	4	Playoffs
4	Tahiti	3	0	3	142	269	−127	3	Seventh place game

Source: FIBA
Rules for classification: 1) Points; 2) Head-to-head results; 3) Points difference; 4) Points scored.

13 July 2025
13:30

Boxscore

Chinese Taipei	122–38	Tahiti
Scoring by quarter: 29–14, 34–5, 34–11, 25–8
Pts: Huang L. 18; Rebs: Liao 10; Asts: Peng S. 10		Pts: Beherec 10; Rebs: Beherec 8 Asts: five players 2

Shenzhen Sports Center Gymnasium, Shenzhen
Attendance: 250
Referees: Glenn Cornelio (PHI), Madison Crowley-Long (AUS), Budi Marfan (INA)

13 July 2025
16:30

Boxscore

Kazakhstan	68–85	India
Scoring by quarter: 20–14, 13–25, 14–30, 21–16
Pts: Koroleva, Alishauskaite 16; Rebs: Yakovleva 8 Asts: Alishauskaite, Bagmet 4		Pts: Senthil 23; Rebs: Ramesh 11; Asts: Thirunavukkarasu 8

Shenzhen Sports Center Gymnasium, Shenzhen
Attendance: 75
Referees: Hu Jing (CHN), Ami Takano (JPN), Samaneh Deghani (IRI)

14 July 2025
16:30

Boxscore

India	39–83	Chinese Taipei
Scoring by quarter: 10–19, 9–20, 10–18, 10–26
Pts: Kaur 8 Rebs: Senthil 9 Asts: three players 2		Pts: Lin Y. 13; Rebs: three players 6 Asts: Peng H. 5

Shenzhen Sports Center Gymnasium, Shenzhen
Attendance: 200
Referees: Jennifer Ammoury (LBN), Madison Crowley-Long (AUS), Chitchanok Srisawat (THA)

14 July 2025
19:30

Boxscore

Tahiti	49–69	Kazakhstan
Scoring by quarter: 10–12, 7–24, 18–17, 14–16
Pts: Tavanae, Oestreicher 12; Rebs: Beherec 14; Asts: Bayle 3		Pts: Alishauskaite 16; Rebs: Kudryavtseva 7 Asts: Bagmet 4

Shenzhen Sports Center Gymnasium, Shenzhen
Attendance: 100
Referees: Jang Jae-won (KOR), Lau Suk Yee (HKG), Fang Wenxuan (CHN)

15 July 2025
19:30

Boxscore

Chinese Taipei	91–47	Kazakhstan
Scoring by quarter: 22–17, 22–12, 27–8, 20–10
Pts: Han 16; Rebs: Huang H. 10; Asts: three players 4		Pts: Yakovleva 12; Rebs: Yakovleva 6 Asts: Aleshkova 5

Shenzhen Sports Center Gymnasium, Shenzhen
Attendance: 400
Referees: Sasha Nicholson (NZL), Jennifer Ammoury (LBN), Chitchanok Srisawat (THA)

16 July 2025
13:30

Boxscore

India	78–55	Tahiti
Scoring by quarter: 25–13, 21–12, 15–15, 17–15
Pts: Rani 15; Rebs: Senthil 7 Asts: Krishnamurthi 6		Pts: Beherec 15; Rebs: Beherec 10; Asts: Tavanae 5

Shenzhen Sports Center Gymnasium, Shenzhen
Attendance: 50
Referees: Ami Takano (JPN), Madison Crowley-Long (AUS), Fang Wenxuan (CHN)

==== Group B ====
Pos	Team	Pld	W	L	PF	PA	PD	Pts	Qualification
1	Iran	3	3	0	251	149	+102	6	Semifinals
2	Mongolia	3	2	1	218	218	0	5	Playoffs
3	Thailand	3	1	2	217	216	+1	4	Playoffs
4	Cook Islands	3	0	3	142	245	−103	3	Seventh place game

Source: FIBA
Rules for classification: 1) Points; 2) Head-to-head results; 3) Points difference; 4) Points scored.

13 July 2025
19:30

Boxscore

Iran	82–32	Cook Islands
Scoring by quarter: 24–11, 24–6, 9–5, 25–10
Pts: Barahman 20; Rebs: Rasoulipour 8 Asts: Barahman 11		Pts: Sadler 13; Rebs: Sadler 10; Asts: Sadler 2

Shenzhen Sports Center Gymnasium, Shenzhen
Attendance: 100
Referees: Yu Yijing (CHN), Sasha Nicholson (NZL), Huang Yun-hsuan (TPE)

14 July 2025
13:30

Boxscore

Thailand	74–81	Mongolia
Scoring by quarter: 21–17, 21–22, 19–18, 13–24
Pts: Udomsuk 21; Rebs: Thuamon 9 Asts: Bunsiprom 6		Pts: Nandinkhusel 19; Rebs: Onolbaatar 10; Asts: Nandinkhusel 7

Shenzhen Sports Center Gymnasium, Shenzhen
Attendance: 150
Referees: Matthew Ryan Bathurst (NZL), Ami Takano (JPN), Budi Marfan (INA)

15 July 2025
13:30

Boxscore

Mongolia	55–89	Iran
Scoring by quarter: 10–29, 24–16, 10–21, 11–23
Pts: Baattar 14; Rebs: Baatar 11; Asts: Bat-Erdene 5		Pts: Abedi 19; Rebs: Abedi 9 Asts: Khodamoradi 5

Shenzhen Sports Center Gymnasium, Shenzhen
Attendance: 100
Referees: Scott Beker (AUS), Kim Bo-hui (KOR), Matthew Ryan Bathurst (NZL)

15 July 2025
16:30

Boxscore

Cook Islands	55–81	Thailand
Scoring by quarter: 20–22, 11–12, 14–26, 10–21
Pts: Sadler 18; Rebs: Sadler 14; Asts: Tuaiti 4		Pts: Udomsuk 20; Rebs: Kunchuan 6 Asts: Kunchuan 4

Shenzhen Sports Center Gymnasium, Shenzhen
Attendance: 50
Referees: Hu Jing (CHN), Yu Yijing (CHN), Lau Suk Yee (HKG)

16 July 2025
16:30

Boxscore

Iran	80–62	Thailand
Scoring by quarter: 18–16, 27–17, 13–19, 22–10
Pts: Rasoulipour 20; Rebs: Abedi 16; Asts: Rasoulipour 5		Pts: Udomsuk 18; Rebs: Kunchuan 7 Asts: Kunchuan 4

Shenzhen Sports Center Gymnasium, Shenzhen
Referees: Kim Bo-hui (KOR), Jiang Wen'an (CHN), Glenn Cornelio (PHI)

16 July 2025
19:30

Boxscore

Mongolia	82–55	Cook Islands
Scoring by quarter: 30–6, 15–21, 20–19, 17–9
Pts: Bat-Erdene 25; Rebs: Bat-Erdene 10; Asts: Nandinkhusel 6		Pts: Pepe 22; Rebs: Sadler 12; Asts: Kiriau 5

Shenzhen Sports Center Gymnasium, Shenzhen
Attendance: 50
Referees: Hu Jing (CHN), Budi Marfan (INA), Huang Yun-hsuan (TPE)

=== Knockout round ===
==== Bracket ====
Qualification to semifinals
18 July
Mongolia	78
Kazakhstan	70
18 July
India	76
Thailand	93

Semifinals
19 July
Chinese Taipei	92
Mongolia	82
19 July
Iran	78
Thailand	52
Fifth place
19 July
Kazakhstan	77
India	103

Final
20 July
Chinese Taipei	74
Iran	55
Third place
20 July
Mongolia	73
Thailand	78

==== Qualification to semifinals ====
18 July 2025
13:30

Boxscore

India	76–93	Thailand
Scoring by quarter: 18–20, 15–19, 18–29, 25–25
Pts: Senthil 23; Rebs: Senthil 7 Asts: Rani 8		Pts: Udomsuk 25; Rebs: Kunchuan 5 Asts: Kunchuan 5

Shenzhen Sports Center Gymnasium, Shenzhen
Attendance: 100
Referees: Yu Yijing (CHN), Sasha Nicholson (NZL), Ami Takano (JPN)

18 July 2025
16:30

Boxscore

Mongolia	78–70	Kazakhstan
Scoring by quarter: 33–17, 17–18, 16–11, 12–24
Pts: Nandinkhusel 19; Rebs: Onolbaatar 10; Asts: Nandinkhusel 7		Pts: Alishauskaite 21; Rebs: Yakovleva 6 Asts: Bagmet 5

Shenzhen Sports Center Gymnasium, Shenzhen
Attendance: 50
Referees: Glenn Cornelio (PHI), Kim Bo-hui (KOR), Matthew Ryan Bathurst (NZL)

==== Semifinals ====
19 July 2025
13:30

Boxscore

Iran	78–52	Thailand
Scoring by quarter: 18–7, 24–14, 18–13, 18–18
Pts: Barahman 20; Rebs: Abedi, Shojaeikohnehshahri 8 Asts: Rasoulipour 8		Pts: Udomsuk 24; Rebs: Kunchuan 7 Asts: Summat 4

Shenzhen Sports Center Gymnasium, Shenzhen
Attendance: 200
Referees: Scott Beker (AUS), Ami Takano (JPN), Budi Marfan (INA)

19 July 2025
16:30

Boxscore

Chinese Taipei	92–82	Mongolia
Scoring by quarter: 25–23, 28–14, 18–20, 20–25
Pts: Han 21; Rebs: Lin W. 10; Asts: four players 4		Pts: Onolbaatar 24; Rebs: Bat-Erdene 11; Asts: Bat-Erdene, Baatar 5

Shenzhen Sports Center Gymnasium, Shenzhen
Referees: Glenn Cornelio (PHI), Kim Bo-hui (KOR), Matthew Ryan Bathurst (NZL)

==== Seventh place game ====
18 July 2025
19:30

Boxscore

Tahiti	50–78	Cook Islands
Scoring by quarter: 11–18, 11–14, 15–22, 13–24
Pts: Bayle 11; Rebs: Beherec 13; Asts: Bayle 4		Pts: Sadler 28; Rebs: Kiriau 11; Asts: Sadler 8

Shenzhen Sports Center Gymnasium, Shenzhen
Attendance: 50
Referees: Samaneh Dehghani (IRI), Budi Marfan (INA), Lau Suk Yee (HKG)

==== Fifth place game ====
19 July 2025
19:30

Boxscore

India	103–77	Kazakhstan
Scoring by quarter: 26–22, 32–12, 21–26, 24–17

Shenzhen Sports Center Gymnasium, Shenzhen
Referees: Hu Jing (CHN), Huang Yun-hsuan (TPE), Fang Wenxuan (CHN)

==== Third place game ====
20 July 2025
13:30

Boxscore

Mongolia	73–78	Thailand
Scoring by quarter: 14−24, 21−21, 16−21, 22−12
Pts: Khulan 18; Rebs: Khulan 9 Asts: Tsatsral 7		Pts: Udomsuk 23; Rebs: Kunchuan 14; Asts: Summat 10

Shenzhen Sports Center Gymnasium, Shenzhen
Referees: Samaneh Dehghani (IRI), Taha Al-Hashedi (YEM), Madison Crowley-Long (AUS)

==== Final ====
The winner was promoted to Division A, while the loser remained in Division B.

20 July 2025
16:30

Boxscore

Chinese Taipei	74–55	Iran
Scoring by quarter: 17–18, 23–13, 23–12, 11–12
Pts: Chen W. 18; Rebs: Lin W. 8 Asts: Peng S. 5		Pts: Abedi 23; Rebs: Abedi 15; Asts: Rasoulipour 5

Shenzhen Sports Center Gymnasium, Shenzhen
Referees: Preeda Muongmee (THA), Chan Owe Shiong (MAS), Sasha Nicholson (NZL)

== Final standings ==
=== Division A ===
Qualified for the 2026 FIBA Women's Basketball World Cup
Qualified for the 2026 FIBA Women's Basketball World Cup Qualifying Tournaments
Relegated to Division B of the 2027 FIBA Women's Asia Cup

Rank	Team	Record
1st place, gold medalist(s)	Australia	5–0
2nd place, silver medalist(s)	Japan	4–2
3rd place, bronze medalist(s)	China	4–1
4	South Korea	3–3
5	New Zealand	2–3
6	Philippines	1–4
7	Lebanon	1–3
8	Indonesia	0–4

=== Division B ===
Promoted to Division A of the 2027 FIBA Women's Asia Cup

Rank	Team	Record
1st place, gold medalist(s)	Chinese Taipei	5–0
2nd place, silver medalist(s)	Iran	4–1
3rd place, bronze medalist(s)	Thailand	3–3
4	Mongolia	3–3
5	India	3–2
6	Kazakhstan	1–4
7	Cook Islands	1–3
8	Tahiti	0–4

== See also ==
- 2025 FIBA Asia Cup
