= Basketball at the 2022 Asian Games – Women's tournament =

Women at the 2022 Asian Games
- Venues: Hangzhou Olympic Expo Center Gymnasium; Shaoxing Olympic Center Gymnasium
- Dates: 27 September – 5 October 2023
- Competitors: 144 from 12 nations

Medalists
gold medal	China
silver medal	Japan
bronze medal	South Korea

The women's 5-on-5 basketball tournament at the 2022 Asian Games was held in Hangzhou and Shaoxing, Zhejiang, China from 27 September to 5 October 2023.

== Squads ==
China	Chinese Taipei	Hong Kong	India
Li Yuan; Wang Siyu; Yang Shuyu; Yang Liwei; Jin Weina; Li Meng; Zhang Ru; Huang Sijing; Pan Zhenqi; Luo Xinyu; Li Yueru; Han Xu	Pan Tzu-yin; Lo Pin; Chen Yen-yu; Chen Wei-an; Cheng I-hsiu; Lin Yu-ting; Cho Ching; Huang Ling-chuan; Hsu Yu-lien; Lin Tieh; Liu Hsi-yeh; Peng Hsiao-tong	Lui Shuk Yi; Ko Tsz Ching; Lau Sheung Hok; Yam Hui Yin; Tong Hiu Lui; Chan Tsz Ki; Chan Wai Ping; Chan Yan Man; Wong Po Sze; Li Tsz Kwan; Tsui Wing Yu; Wong Ka Man	Pushpa Senthil Kumar; Anmolpreet Kaur; Sreekala Rani; Manmeet Kaur; Shireen Limaye; Poonam Chaturvedi; Sahana Shivamogga Mohan; Bhandavya Mahesh; Madhu Kumari; Kavitha Jose; Sruthy Rathinavel; Sanjana Ramesh
Indonesia	Japan	Kazakhstan	Mongolia
Lea Elvensia Kahol; Dyah Lestari; Agustin Gradita; Dewa Ayu Made Sriartha; Priscilla Annabel Karen; Faizzatus Shoimah; Yuni Anggraeni; Jesslyn Angelique; Nathania Orville; Henny Sutjiono; Kim Pierre-Louis; Clarita Antonio	Mai Kawai; Maki Takada; Minami Yabu; Azusa Asahina; Nako Motohashi; Saki Hayashi; Aika Hirashita; Saori Miyazaki; Anri Hoshi; Nanako Todo; Himawari Akaho; Monica Okoye	Liya Umerova; Rufina Gavrilyuk; Oxana Bagmet; Tamara Kuzmina; Mariya Astapenko; Anastassiya Alishauskaite; Oxana Nurbayeva; Anna Bezgodova; Nadezhda Yakovleva; Yekaterina Gammer; Daria Koroleva; Annastassiya Ilyassova	Mönkhsaikhany Tserenlkham; Battogtokhyn Önörzayaa; Muratyn Bulbul; Bayarmaagiin Tsatsral; Batkhuyagiin Tsaschimeg; Onolbaataryn Khulan; Baataryn Bolor-Erdene; Undarmaagiin Sodtsetseg; Battsoojiin Bolor-Erdene; Tüvshinjargalyn Ülemj; Amaraagiin Sarantuyaa; Oyuntsetsegiin Zultsetseg
North Korea	Philippines	South Korea	Thailand
Pak Yu-jong; Kim Hye-yon; Kim So-yon; Ri Un-jong; Kang Hyang-mi; An Hyon-ju; Hong Ryon-a; Kim Ryu-jong; Ro Suk-yong; An Hyon-gyong; Ko Un-gyong; Pak Jin-a	Khate Castillo; Afril Bernardino; Camille Nolasco; Chack Cabinbin; Janine Pontejos; Louna Ozar; Jack Animam; Stefanie Berberabe; Monique del Carmen; Katrina Guytingco; Marizze Tongco; Mikka Cacho	Shin Ji-hyun; Kang Lee-seul; An He-ji; Lee So-hee; Park Ji-su; Lee Kyung-eun; Kang Yoo-lim; Park Ji-hyun; Lee Hae-ran; Kim Dan-bi; Yang In-young; Jin An	Amphawa Thuamon; Pimchosita Supyen; Thunchanok Lumdabpang; Sasiporn Wongtapha; Rattiyakorn Udomsuk; Wanatsanan Saisamarn; Lalia Tate; Jirawan Rungrueang; Warinthon Summat; Laksamee Hewchaiyaphum; Kanokwan Prajuapsook; Chosita Sakaret

== Results ==
All times are China Standard Time (UTC+08:00)

=== Preliminary round ===
==== Group A ====
Pos	Team	Pld	W	L	PF	PA	PD	Pts	Qualification
1	China	3	3	0	313	151	+162	6	Quarterfinals
2	India	3	2	1	187	219	−32	5	Quarterfinals
3	Indonesia	3	1	2	167	231	−64	4	Quarterfinals
4	Mongolia	3	0	3	172	238	−66	3	

Source: OCA

27 September
20:00

Report

China	101–46	Mongolia
Scoring by quarter: 30–15, 30–11, 21–14, 20–6
Pts: Li Yue. 18; Rebs: Li Yue. 11; Asts: Wang 9		Pts: Khulan 16; Rebs: Bulbul 7 Asts: Önörzayaa 3

Olympic Expo Center Gymnasium, Hangzhou
Referees: Preeda Muongmee (THA), Issam Al-Siyabi (OMA), Cheon Kam-jae (KOR)

27 September
20:00

Report

India	66–46	Indonesia
Scoring by quarter: 18–14, 11–11, 9–11, 28–10
Pts: Kumar 18; Rebs: Rathinavel 14; Asts: Limaye, Ramesh 4		Pts: Pierre-Louis 15; Rebs: Pierre-Louis 12; Asts: Gradita 7

Olympic Center Gymnasium, Shaoxing
Referees: Wissam Zein (SYR), Huang Yun-hsuan (TPE), Mohamed Al-Salam (BRN)

29 September
20:00

Report

Indonesia	52–101	China
Scoring by quarter: 6–18, 12–22, 16–31, 18–30
Pts: Pierre-Louis 22; Rebs: Pierre-Louis 9 Asts: Gradita 3		Pts: Li Yue. 22; Rebs: Huang 11; Asts: Li Yua. 8

Olympic Expo Center Gymnasium, Hangzhou
Referees: Preeda Muongmee (THA), Bandar Al-Suwaidi (QAT), Totie Celeste (PHI)

29 September
20:00

Report

Mongolia	62–68	India
Scoring by quarter: 16–19, 15–20, 13–16, 18–13
Pts: Bulbul 21; Rebs: Bolor-Erdene 12; Asts: Önörzayaa 9		Pts: Kumar 30; Rebs: Kumar 12; Asts: Limaye 7

Olympic Center Gymnasium, Shaoxing
Referees: Wissam Zein (SYR), Kim Bo-hui (KOR), Taha Al-Hashedi (YEM)

1 October
20:00

Report

China	111–53	India
Scoring by quarter: 38–7, 20–19, 32–13, 21–14
Pts: Li Yue. 25; Rebs: Li Yue. 10; Asts: Wang 8		Pts: Kumar, Ramesh 14; Rebs: Kumar 11; Asts: Limaye 3

Olympic Expo Center Gymnasium, Hangzhou
Referees: Kim Bo-hui (KOR), Bandar Al-Suwaidi (QAT), Tee Yong Sern (MAS)

1 October
20:00

Report

Indonesia	69–64	Mongolia
Scoring by quarter: 15–19, 15–16, 15–13, 24–16
Pts: Pierre-Louis 44; Rebs: Pierre-Louis 14; Asts: Gradita, Orville 5		Pts: Khulan 22; Rebs: Tsatsral, Bolor-Erdene 8 Asts: Tsatsral 5

Olympic Center Gymnasium, Shaoxing
Referees: Alexey Stepanenko (KAZ), Issam Al-Siyabi (OMA), Anan Daraghma (PLE)

==== Group B ====
Pos	Team	Pld	W	L	PF	PA	PD	Pts	Qualification
1	Japan	3	3	0	306	135	+171	6	Quarterfinals
2	Philippines	3	2	1	241	218	+23	5	Quarterfinals
3	Hong Kong	3	1	2	179	273	−94	4	
4	Kazakhstan	3	0	3	145	245	−100	3	

Source: OCA

27 September
17:30

Report

Japan	118–46	Hong Kong
Scoring by quarter: 32–12, 39–16, 29–8, 18–10
Pts: Takada 22; Rebs: Takada 12; Asts: Miyazaki 8		Pts: Li 20; Rebs: Chan Y. 7 Asts: Chan Y. 3

Olympic Expo Center Gymnasium, Hangzhou
Referees: Kim Bo-hui (KOR), Bandar Al-Suwaidi (QAT), Tee Yong Sern (MAS)

27 September
17:30

Report

Philippines	83–59	Kazakhstan
Scoring by quarter: 17–17, 23–9, 20–15, 23–18
Pts: Pontejos 21; Rebs: Animam 14; Asts: Berberabe 6		Pts: Kuzmina, Bezgodova 12; Rebs: Bezgodova 10; Asts: Bagmet 4

Olympic Center Gymnasium, Shaoxing
Referees: Harja Jaladri (INA), Hu Jing (CHN), Haryanto Sutaryo (INA)

29 September
13:30

Report

Kazakhstan	30–92	Japan
Scoring by quarter: 12–25, 9–26, 3–25, 6–16
Pts: Koroleva 7 Rebs: Bezgodova 11; Asts: Kuzmina 3		Pts: Hirashita 19; Rebs: Asahina 6 Asts: Miyazaki 8

Olympic Expo Center Gymnasium, Hangzhou
Referees: Hu Jing (CHN), Ahmad Al-Yousef (JOR), Yu Yijing (CHN)

29 September
13:30

Report

Hong Kong	63–99	Philippines
Scoring by quarter: 20–19, 14–23, 12–23, 17–34
Pts: Tong 15; Rebs: Tong 6 Asts: Tsui 5		Pts: Pontejos 23; Rebs: Animam 22; Asts: Bernardino, Berberabe 6

Olympic Center Gymnasium, Shaoxing
Referees: Issam Al-Siyabi (OMA), Cheon Kam-jae (KOR), Mohammad Rajabi (IRI)

1 October
17:30

Report

Japan	96–59	Philippines
Scoring by quarter: 35–14, 15–12, 16–13, 30–20
Pts: Hirashita 26; Rebs: Akaho 9 Asts: Miyazaki 8		Pts: Pontejos 13; Rebs: Animam 7 Asts: Cabinbin 4

Olympic Expo Center Gymnasium, Hangzhou
Referees: Harja Jaladri (INA), Wissam Zein (SYR), Ahmed Al-Khamees (KSA)

1 October
17:30

Report

Kazakhstan	56–70	Hong Kong
Scoring by quarter: 22–9, 10–25, 14–13, 10–23
Pts: Alishauskaite 15; Rebs: Bezgodova 25; Asts: Kuzmina 3		Pts: Li 18; Rebs: Tsu 8 Asts: Li 4

Olympic Center Gymnasium, Shaoxing
Referees: Preeda Muongmee (THA), Haryanto Sutaryo (INA), Cheon Kam-jae (KOR)

==== Group C ====
Pos	Team	Pld	W	L	PF	PA	PD	Pts	Qualification
1	South Korea	3	3	0	258	177	+81	6	Quarterfinals
2	North Korea	3	2	1	258	207	+51	5	Quarterfinals
3	Chinese Taipei	3	1	2	194	232	−38	4	Quarterfinals
4	Thailand	3	0	3	159	253	−94	3	

Source: OCA

27 September
13:30

Report

South Korea	90–56	Thailand
Scoring by quarter: 25–7, 22–11, 31–15, 12–23
Pts: Kang L. 18; Rebs: Kang L. 8 Asts: Park J.H. 9		Pts: Thuamon 16; Rebs: Thuamon 7 Asts: Rungrueang 6

Olympic Expo Center Gymnasium, Hangzhou
Referees: Alexey Stepanenko (KAZ), Ahmed Al-Khamees (KSA), Totie Celeste (PHI)

27 September
13:30

Report

Chinese Taipei	77–91	North Korea
Scoring by quarter: 17–14, 16–22, 25–33, 19–22
Pts: Lo, Chen W. 12; Rebs: Chen W. 8 Asts: Cheng 6		Pts: Pak J. 51; Rebs: Pak J. 14; Asts: Ro 11

Olympic Center Gymnasium, Shaoxing
Referees: Yana Nikogossyan (KAZ), Ahmad Al-Yousef (JOR), Anan Daraghma (PLE)

29 September
17:30

Report

North Korea	62–81	South Korea
Scoring by quarter: 13–11, 12–22, 17–29, 20–19
Pts: Pak J. 29; Rebs: Pak J. 17; Asts: Ro 9		Pts: Park J.S. 18; Rebs: Park J.S. 13; Asts: Kim 7

Olympic Expo Center Gymnasium, Hangzhou
Referees: Paul Skayem (LBN), Alexey Stepanenko (KAZ), Tee Yong Sern (MAS)

29 September
17:30

Report

Thailand	54–58	Chinese Taipei
Scoring by quarter: 16–19, 16–13, 11–6, 11–20
Pts: Udomsuk 14; Rebs: Lumdabpang 20; Asts: Lumdabpang, Wongtapha, Udomsuk 4		Pts: Lo 11; Rebs: Lin T. 8 Asts: Lin Y. 6

Olympic Center Gymnasium, Shaoxing
Referees: Harja Jaladri (INA), Yana Nikogossyan (KAZ), Anan Daraghma (PLE)

1 October
13:30

Report

South Korea	87–59	Chinese Taipei
Scoring by quarter: 21–18, 24–19, 18–11, 24–11
Pts: Kim 18; Rebs: Park J.H. 11; Asts: An 9		Pts: Lin Y. 16; Rebs: Lin T. 9 Asts: Cheng 5

Olympic Expo Center Gymnasium, Hangzhou
Referees: Yana Nikogossyan (KAZ), Mohamed Al-Salam (BRN), Ahmad Al-Yousef (JOR)

1 October
13:30

Report

North Korea	105–49	Thailand
Scoring by quarter: 27–16, 26–14, 29–10, 23–9
Pts: Pak J. 36; Rebs: Pak J. 14; Asts: Kang 13		Pts: Udomsuk 15; Rebs: Lumdabpang 6 Asts: Thuamon 3

Olympic Center Gymnasium, Shaoxing
Referees: Taha Al-Hashedi (YEM), Mohammad Rajabi (IRI), Totie Celeste (PHI)

==== Summary ====
Pos	Team	Pld	W	L	GF	GA	GD	Pts	Qualification
1	Japan	3	3	0	306	135	+171	6	Quarterfinals
2	China	3	3	0	313	151	+162	6	Quarterfinals
3	South Korea	3	3	0	258	177	+81	6	Quarterfinals
4	North Korea	3	2	1	258	207	+51	5	Quarterfinals
5	Philippines	3	2	1	241	218	+23	5	Quarterfinals
6	India	3	2	1	187	219	−32	5	Quarterfinals
7	Chinese Taipei	3	1	2	194	232	−38	4	Quarterfinals
8	Indonesia	3	1	2	167	231	−64	4	Quarterfinals
9	Hong Kong	3	1	2	179	273	−94	4	
10	Mongolia	3	0	3	172	238	−66	3	
11	Thailand	3	0	3	159	253	−94	3	
12	Kazakhstan	3	0	3	145	245	−100	3	

Source: OCA

=== Knockout round ===
Quarterfinals
2 October
India	57
North Korea	96
2 October
China	104
Chinese Taipei	60
2 October
Indonesia	47
Japan	89
2 October
South Korea	93
Philippines	71

Semifinals
3 October
North Korea	44
China	100
3 October
Japan	81
South Korea	58

Gold medal game
5 October
China	74
Japan	72
Bronze medal game
5 October
North Korea	63
South Korea	93

==== Quarterfinals ====
2 October
16:00

Report

China	104–60	Chinese Taipei
Scoring by quarter: 22–24, 25–7, 31–17, 26–12
Pts: Li Yue. 29; Rebs: Li Yue. 12; Asts: Li Yua. 7		Pts: Huang 13; Rebs: Cheng 6 Asts: Lin Y. 3

Olympic Expo Center Gymnasium, Hangzhou
Referees: Preeda Muongmee (THA), Kim Bo-hui (KOR), Anan Daraghma (PLE)

2 October
16:00

Report

India	57–96	North Korea
Scoring by quarter: 20–26, 6–26, 17–22, 14–22
Pts: Rani 16; Rebs: Kumar 6 Asts: Kumar, A. Kaur, Rani 2		Pts: Hong, Pak J. 29; Rebs: Pak J. 10; Asts: Ro 13

Olympic Center Gymnasium, Shaoxing
Referees: Yu Yijing (CHN), Yana Nikogossyan (KAZ), Song Houlu (CHN)

2 October
20:00

Report

South Korea	93–71	Philippines
Scoring by quarter: 23–13, 23–19, 24–23, 23–16
Pts: Kang L., Park J.S. 15; Rebs: Park J.H., Jin 8 Asts: Lee K. 7		Pts: Castillo 18; Rebs: Animam 14; Asts: Bernardino 5

Olympic Center Gymnasium, Shaoxing
Referees: Mohamed Al-Salam (BRN), Li Chengxin (CHN), Fang Wenxuan (CHN)

2 October
20:00

Report

Indonesia	47–89	Japan
Scoring by quarter: 15–25, 12–20, 9–22, 11–22
Pts: Pierre-Louis 17; Rebs: Pierre-Louis 11; Asts: Sriartha 4		Pts: Kawai 15; Rebs: Asahina 9 Asts: Kawai 5

Olympic Expo Center Gymnasium, Hangzhou
Referees: Issam Al-Siyabi (OMA), Tee Yong Sern (MAS), Ahmed Al-Khamees (KSA)

==== Semifinals ====
3 October
16:00

Report

North Korea	44–100	China
Scoring by quarter: 6–22, 21–26, 11–29, 6–23
Pts: Hong 14; Rebs: Ro 8 Asts: Ro 5		Pts: Li Yue. 25; Rebs: Li Yue. 15; Asts: Li Yua. 8

Olympic Expo Center Gymnasium, Hangzhou
Referees: Yana Nikogossyan (KAZ), Bandar Al-Suwaidi (QAT), Tee Yong Sern (MAS)

3 October
20:00

Report

Japan	81–58	South Korea
Scoring by quarter: 20–15, 20–18, 16–11, 25–14
Pts: Takada 15; Rebs: Akaho 11; Asts: Miyazaki 7		Pts: Park J.S. 18; Rebs: Park J.S. 9 Asts: An 6

Olympic Expo Center Gymnasium, Hangzhou
Referees: Preeda Muongmee (THA), Anan Daraghma (PLE), Haryanto Sutaryo (INA)

==== Bronze medal game ====
5 October
16:00

Report

North Korea	63–93	South Korea
Scoring by quarter: 21–15, 12–25, 11–21, 19–32
Pts: Pak J. 27; Rebs: Pak J. 9 Asts: Kang, Ro 5		Pts: Park J.S. 25; Rebs: Park J.S. 10; Asts: An, Park J.S. 7

Olympic Expo Center Gymnasium, Hangzhou
Referees: Yuen Chun Yip (HKG), Hu Jing (CHN), Ahmed Al-Khamees (KSA)

==== Gold medal game ====
5 October
20:00

Report

China	74–72	Japan
Scoring by quarter: 26–16, 19–24, 12–11, 17–21
Pts: Li M. 17; Rebs: Huang, Li Yue. 9 Asts: Huang 5		Pts: Hayashi 17; Rebs: Takada, Akaho 8 Asts: Kawai 8

Olympic Expo Center Gymnasium, Hangzhou
Referees: Wissam Zein (SYR), Yana Nikogossyan (KAZ), Preeda Muongmee (THA)

== Final standing ==
Rank	Team	Pld	W	L
1st place, gold medalist(s)	China	6	6	0
2nd place, silver medalist(s)	Japan	6	5	1
3rd place, bronze medalist(s)	South Korea	6	5	1
4	North Korea	6	3	3
5	Philippines	4	2	2
6	India	4	2	2
7	Chinese Taipei	4	1	3
8	Indonesia	4	1	3
9	Hong Kong	3	1	2
10	Mongolia	3	0	3
11	Thailand	3	0	3
12	Kazakhstan	3	0	3
