= 2018 FIBA Under-18 Women's Asian Championship squads =

This article shows the rosters of all participating teams at the 2018 FIBA Under-18 Women's Asian Championship in Bangalore, India.

== Division A ==
=== Australia ===
Australia women's national under-19 basketball team roster
Players
Coaches

Pos.	No.	Name	Age – Date of birth	Height	Club	Ctr.
G	4	Jazmin Shelley	18 – 13 May 2000	1.75 m (5 ft 9 in)	Melbourne Boomers	(Australia)
SF	5	Emma Clarke	18 – 18 March 2000	1.86 m (6 ft 1 in)		(Australia)
F	6	Juliva Motuga	18 – 6 April 2000	1.85 m (6 ft 1 in)		(Australia)
G	7	Isabel Palmer	18 – 6 April 2000	1.78 m (5 ft 10 in)		(Australia)
G	8	Lily Scanlon	17 – 21 February 2001	1.75 m (5 ft 9 in)		(Australia)
F	9	Nnenna Emma-Nnopu	17 – 8 May 2001	1.82 m (6 ft 0 in)		(Australia)
SG	10	Miela Goodchild	18 – 6 April 2000	1.79 m (5 ft 10 in)	Duke University	(Australia)
F	11	Samantha Simons	18 – 31 January 2000	1.85 m (6 ft 1 in)	Saint Mary's College of California	(Australia)
F	12	Ashlee Hannan	17 – 21 March 2001	1.92 m (6 ft 4 in)		(Australia)
G	13	Kobe Hawea	18 – 18 February 2000	1.79 m (5 ft 10 in)		(Australia)
C	15	Isobel Anstey	17 – 27 July 2001	1.91 m (6 ft 3 in)	Melbourne Boomers	(Australia)

Head coach

- (Australia) Deanne Butler

Assistant coach(es)

- (Australia) David Herbert
- (Canada) Claudia Brassard-Riebesehl

Legend

- Club – describes current
  club as of tournament
- Age – describes age
  on 28 October 2018

=== China ===
China women's national under-19 basketball team roster
Players
Coaches

Pos.	No.	Name	Age – Date of birth	Height	Club	Ctr.
G	4	Ming Zheng	17 – 6 April 2001	1.70 m (5 ft 7 in)	Beijing ShouGang Basketball Club	(China)
G	5	Yuan Li	18 – 29 May 2000	1.70 m (5 ft 7 in)	Shandong Women's Team	(China)
G	6	Zhuoya Fang	18 – 26 October 2000	1.66 m (5 ft 5 in)	Sichuan Sports Bureau	(China)
G	7	Bingzhen Li	18 – 12 August 2000	1.72 m (5 ft 8 in)	Jiangsu Sports Bureau	(China)
G	8	Dandan Zhu	18 – 19 March 2000	1.79 m (5 ft 10 in)	Zhejiang College of Sports	(China)
F	9	Shuyu Yang	16 – 6 March 2002	1.80 m (5 ft 11 in)	Guangdong Sports Bureau	(China)
PF	10	Ziting Tang	18 – 14 June 2000	1.90 m (6 ft 3 in)	Beijing Normal University	(China)
C	11	Mingling Chen	18 – 25 July 2000	1.92 m (6 ft 4 in)	Guangdong Sports Bureau	(China)
F	12	Yuyan Li	17 – 6 March 2001	1.85 m (6 ft 1 in)	Chongqing Sports Bureau	(China)
F	14	Kun Huang	16 – 17 May 2002	1.83 m (6 ft 0 in)	Jiangsu Sports Bureau	(China)
C	15	Yutong Liu	17 – 5 February 2001	1.95 m (6 ft 5 in)	Beijing Normal University	(China)
PF	16	Jiajin Yu	18 – 11 July 2000	1.88 m (6 ft 2 in)	Zhejiang College of Sports	(China)

Head coach

- (China) Cong Xuedi

Legend

- Club – describes current
  club as of tournament
- Age – describes age
  on 28 October 2018

=== Chinese Taipei ===
Chinese Taipei women's national under-19 basketball team roster
Players
Coaches

Pos.	No.	Name	Age – Date of birth	Height	Club	Ctr.
C	0	Yu-chieh Chen	16 – 15 June 2002	1.80 m (5 ft 11 in)		(Chinese Taipei)
G	4	Yi Hua Li	16 – 1 February 2002	1.63 m (5 ft 4 in)		(Chinese Taipei)
F	5	Yu Ting Chen	17 – 24 November 2000	1.67 m (5 ft 6 in)		(Chinese Taipei)
PG	6	Pei Yi Lo	18 – 1 March 2000	1.63 m (5 ft 4 in)		(Chinese Taipei)
SG	8	Hsuan Chia Hung	18 – 20 September 2000	1.69 m (5 ft 7 in)		(Chinese Taipei)
C	9	Chih Ying Chen	16 – 30 July 2002	1.73 m (5 ft 8 in)		(Chinese Taipei)
PF	11	Chin-wan Hsieh	17 – 30 August 2001	1.78 m (5 ft 10 in)		(Chinese Taipei)
C	12	Ya-tong Chen	18 – 31 August 2000	1.79 m (5 ft 10 in)		(Chinese Taipei)
SF	13	Chia-jung Lin	17 – 4 January 2001	1.70 m (5 ft 7 in)		(Chinese Taipei)
PF	14	Hui-tzu Cheng	17 – 5 October 2001	1.74 m (5 ft 9 in)		(Chinese Taipei)
PF	17	Wei-ju Wu	17 – 1 November 2000	1.73 m (5 ft 8 in)		(Chinese Taipei)
G	18	Shih Han Hsu	18 – 15 July 2000	1.64 m (5 ft 5 in)		(Chinese Taipei)

Head coach

- (Chinese Taipei) Li Lu-Chen

Legend

- Club – describes current
  club as of tournament
- Age – describes age
  on 28 October 2018

=== Indonesia ===
Indonesia women's national under-19 basketball team roster
Players
Coaches

Pos.	No.	Name	Age – Date of birth	Height	Club	Ctr.
PF	1	Jasmine Isabelle	17 – 16 March 2001	1.70 m (5 ft 7 in)		(Indonesia)
PG	2	Nia Titin Sulistyarini	18 – 2 May 2000	1.60 m (5 ft 3 in)		(Indonesia)
G	7	Leonita Angela Suwanto	18 – 15 October 2000	1.68 m (5 ft 6 in)		(Indonesia)
SG	9	Audy Natazia Christy Thoe	17 – 6 December 2000	1.68 m (5 ft 6 in)		(Indonesia)
SG	10	Nikita Ferliana	18 – 25 July 2000	1.68 m (5 ft 6 in)		(Indonesia)
SF	11	Faizzatus Shoimah	17 – 13 December 2000	1.75 m (5 ft 9 in)		(Indonesia)
PG	12	Adelaide Callista Wongsohardjo	17 – 12 October 2001	1.73 m (5 ft 8 in)		(Indonesia)
SF	14	Mario Leony Alvaretta	18 – 19 February 2000	1.74 m (5 ft 9 in)		(Indonesia)
C	16	Husna Aulia Latifah	18 – 5 January 2000	1.83 m (6 ft 0 in)		(Indonesia)
G	17	Tricia Mary Aoijs	17 – 26 March 2001	1.70 m (5 ft 7 in)		(Indonesia)
C	18	Jesslyn Angelique Aritonang	16 – 18 July 2002	1.70 m (5 ft 7 in)		(Indonesia)
SF	24	Sabrina Ayu Sandewang	17 – 6 May 2001	1.64 m (5 ft 5 in)		(Indonesia)

Head coach

- (Indonesia) Arif Gunarto

Assistant coach(es)

- (Indonesia) Oey Andre Yuwadi
- (Indonesia) Wiwit Agus Cahyono

Legend

- Club – describes current
  club as of tournament
- Age – describes age
  on 28 October 2018

=== Japan ===
Japan women's national under-19 basketball team roster
Players
Coaches

Pos.	No.	Name	Age – Date of birth	Height	Club	Ctr.
PG	4	Yuzuka Ishihara	18 – 2 January 2000	1.62 m (5 ft 4 in)		(Japan)
C	5	Shori Yamashita	18 – 17 February 2000	1.85 m (6 ft 1 in)		(Japan)
PF	6	Layla Takehara	18 – 12 March 2000	1.85 m (6 ft 1 in)		(Japan)
SF	7	Ririka Okuyama	18 – 6 April 2000	1.78 m (5 ft 10 in)		(Japan)
PG	8	Miyabi Sakamoto	18 – 8 April 2000	1.69 m (5 ft 7 in)		(Japan)
SG	9	Norika Konno	18 – 1 May 2000	1.77 m (5 ft 10 in)		(Japan)
SG	10	Hikari Komura	18 – 20 July 2000	1.78 m (5 ft 10 in)		(Japan)
SG	11	Chinatsu Umeki	18 – 12 August 2000	1.66 m (5 ft 5 in)		(Japan)
SG	12	Aoi Ishimaki	18 – 17 September 2000	1.65 m (5 ft 5 in)		(Japan)
SF	13	Nanako Todo	17 – 29 November 2000	1.75 m (5 ft 9 in)		(Japan)
C	14	Maya McArthur	17 – 29 January 2001	1.81 m (5 ft 11 in)		(Japan)
PG	15	Saki Ikeda	17 – 18 March 2001	1.58 m (5 ft 2 in)		(Japan)

Head coach

- (Japan) Mikiko Hagiwara

Assistant coach(es)

- (Japan) Yutaka Ono

Legend

- Club – describes current
  club as of tournament
- Age – describes age
  on 28 October 2018

=== Malaysia ===
Malaysia women's national under-19 basketball team roster
Players
Coaches

Pos.	No.	Name	Age – Date of birth	Height	Club	Ctr.
F	6	Lai Toong Tan	16 – 6 February 2002	1.67 m (5 ft 6 in)		(Malaysia)
SG	7	Sin Lu Yong	18 – 24 June 2000	1.67 m (5 ft 6 in)		(Malaysia)
C	8	Jia Wei Hin	18 – 12 May 2000	1.72 m (5 ft 8 in)		(Malaysia)
SG	9	Sin Jie Tan	16 – 9 May 2002	1.68 m (5 ft 6 in)		(Malaysia)
F	11	Zi Wong	16 – 8 July 2002	1.55 m (5 ft 1 in)		(Malaysia)
SG	13	Weng Yen Chan	17 – 5 December 2000	1.56 m (5 ft 1 in)		(Malaysia)
F	17	Su Xin Tang	16 – 17 July 2002	1.68 m (5 ft 6 in)		(Malaysia)
G	18	Zi Wei Wong	17 – 25 July 2001	1.60 m (5 ft 3 in)		(Malaysia)
G	21	Li Xuan Lee	15 – 2 November 2002	1.55 m (5 ft 1 in)		(Malaysia)
C	22	Juraimi Nur Adila Shahira	16 – 22 May 2002	1.75 m (5 ft 9 in)		(Malaysia)
F	77	Khang Yuin Christine Goh	15 – 5 April 2003	1.64 m (5 ft 5 in)		(Malaysia)
G	88	Shi Yu Lim	16 – 27 March 2002	1.60 m (5 ft 3 in)		(Malaysia)

Head coach

- (Malaysia) Choo Seck Yun

Assistant coach(es)

- (Malaysia) Yoong Sze Yuin

Legend

- Club – describes current
  club as of tournament
- Age – describes age
  on 28 October 2018

=== New Zealand ===
New Zealand women's national under-19 basketball team roster
Players
Coaches

Pos.	No.	Name	Age – Date of birth	Height	Club	Ctr.
SG	2	Olivia O'Neill	18 – 10 September 2000	1.76 m (5 ft 9 in)		(New Zealand)
SG	4	Grace Hunter	18 – 4 July 2000	1.75 m (5 ft 9 in)		(New Zealand)
PG	5	Sofia Kennedy	18 – 4 July 2000	1.74 m (5 ft 9 in)		(New Zealand)
SF	6	Koha Lewis	17 – 18 August 2001	1.80 m (5 ft 11 in)		(New Zealand)
PG	11	Tessa Talo	17 – 1 April 2001	1.70 m (5 ft 7 in)		(New Zealand)
SF	12	Emilia Shearer	16 – 22 January 2002	1.78 m (5 ft 10 in)		(New Zealand)
PF	13	Rochelle Fourie	16 – 19 July 2002	1.88 m (6 ft 2 in)		(New Zealand)
SF	22	Ella Bradley	17 – 18 August 2001	1.80 m (5 ft 11 in)		(New Zealand)
SG	24	Leah Mafua	18 – 22 August 2000	1.78 m (5 ft 10 in)		(New Zealand)
G	26	Tayla Dalton	17 – 1 October 2001	1.74 m (5 ft 9 in)		(New Zealand)
PG	33	Charlisse Leger-Walker	17 – 15 September 2001	1.75 m (5 ft 9 in)		(New Zealand)
PF	45	Charlotte Whittaker	18 – 12 August 2000	1.90 m (6 ft 3 in)		(New Zealand)

Head coach

- (New Zealand) Jody Cameron

Assistant coach(es)

- (New Zealand) Leanne Walker
- (New Zealand) Timothy Dennis

Legend

- Club – describes current
  club as of tournament
- Age – describes age
  on 28 October 2018

=== South Korea ===
South Korea women's national under-19 basketball team roster
Players
Coaches

Pos.	No.	Name	Age – Date of birth	Height	Club	Ctr.
	1	Lee-Seul Shin	18 – 30 September 2000			(South Korea)
G	3	Ye-Rim Jung	17 – 20 March 2001			(South Korea)
G	5	In-Ah Park	18 – 16 May 2000	1.68 m (5 ft 6 in)		(South Korea)
G	6	So-Hee Lee	18 – 7 August 2000	1.68 m (5 ft 6 in)		(South Korea)
F	7	Ji-Hyun Park	18 – 7 April 2000	1.80 m (5 ft 11 in)		(South Korea)
F	8	Seo-I Eom	17 – 5 March 2001			(South Korea)
F	9	Na-yeon Ko	17 – 13 August 2001			(South Korea)
	10	Ga-Hee Sun	18 – 7 October 2000			(South Korea)
C	12	Hae-Ran Lee	15 – 29 May 2003			(South Korea)
	13	Ji-Seon Choe	18 – 18 July 2000			(South Korea)
	15	Soo-Jung Lee	16 – 10 November 2001			(South Korea)

Head coach

- (South Korea) Park Soo-Ho

Assistant coach(es)

- (South Korea) Bang Ji-yun
- (South Korea) Lee Sanghoon

Legend

- Club – describes current
  club as of tournament
- Age – describes age
  on 28 October 2018

== Division B ==
=== Guam ===
Guam women's national under-19 basketball team roster
Players
Coaches

Pos.	No.	Name	Age – Date of birth	Height	Club	Ctr.
SF	1	Maria Tatiano	14 – 7 May 2004	1.70 m (5 ft 7 in)		(Guam)
SG	2	Annika Almario	14 – 19 July 2004	1.63 m (5 ft 4 in)		(Guam)
SF	3	Oriana Sevilla	14 – 13 April 2004	1.60 m (5 ft 3 in)		(Guam)
PG	7	Bila Aguon	17 – 3 August 2001	1.50 m (4 ft 11 in)		(Guam)
C	10	Mia San Nicolas	17 – 25 March 2001	1.83 m (6 ft 0 in)		(Guam)
PF	13	Meaghan Cruz	18 – 4 October 2000	1.78 m (5 ft 10 in)		(Guam)
SG	14	Elysia Perez	18 – 24 August 2000	1.65 m (5 ft 5 in)		(Guam)
PG	55	Alana Salas	16 – 18 October 2002	1.57 m (5 ft 2 in)		(Guam)

Head coach

- (Guam) Jimmy Yi

Legend

- Club – describes current
  club as of tournament
- Age – describes age
  on 28 October 2018

=== Hong Kong ===
Hong Kong women's national under-19 basketball team roster
Players
Coaches

Pos.	No.	Name	Age – Date of birth	Height	Club	Ctr.
C	4	Tan Fung TF Ma	18 – 19 October 2000	1.88 m (6 ft 2 in)		(Hong Kong)
F	5	Wai Lok Lam	17 – 5 December 2000	1.70 m (5 ft 7 in)		(Hong Kong)
G	7	Ching Lam	16 – 22 April 2002	1.66 m (5 ft 5 in)		(Hong Kong)
SF	8	Pui Ying Ho	16 – 28 April 2002	1.73 m (5 ft 8 in)		(Hong Kong)
SF	9	Wing Yan Chan	17 – 28 February 2001	1.71 m (5 ft 7 in)		(Hong Kong)
G	12	Sin Wa Pearl Yu	18 – 4 June 2000	1.67 m (5 ft 6 in)		(Hong Kong)
PF	13	Man Nga Shek	18 – 9 September 2000	1.76 m (5 ft 9 in)		(Hong Kong)
PF	14	Sin Ting Lue	16 – 20 September 2002	1.74 m (5 ft 9 in)		(Hong Kong)
G	15	Ying Nok Gabriella Chan	17 – 14 May 2001	1.66 m (5 ft 5 in)		(Hong Kong)
SF	16	Wing Nga Poon	17 – 8 January 2001	1.73 m (5 ft 8 in)		(Hong Kong)
C	20	Xing Wei	18 – 3 March 2000	1.78 m (5 ft 10 in)		(Hong Kong)
SG	39	Nga Man So	18 – 9 March 2000	1.70 m (5 ft 7 in)		(Hong Kong)

Head coach

- (Hong Kong) Koon Kin Ho

Assistant coach(es)

- (Hong Kong) Wong Tsz Ching

Legend

- Club – describes current
  club as of tournament
- Age – describes age
  on 28 October 2018

=== India ===
India women's national under-19 basketball team roster
Players
Coaches

Pos.	No.	Name	Age – Date of birth	Height	Club	Ctr.
	4	Arya Achuta Sreeramaneni	17 – 7 September 2001			(India)
	5	Sakshi Sharma	18 – 10 January 2000			(India)
	6	Dharshini Thirunavukkarasu	18 – 27 March 2000			(India)
	7	Harshitha Bopaiah	18 – 31 July 2000			(India)
C	8	Pushpa Senthil Kumar	17 – 18 September 2001			(India)
PF	9	Srishti Suren	18 – 30 April 2000	1.80 m (5 ft 11 in)		(India)
F	10	Ishwarya Janardhanan	18 – 15 January 2000	1.70 m (5 ft 7 in)		(India)
PF	11	Sreekala Rani	17 – 19 January 2001			(India)
PG	12	Gulabsha Ali	18 – 16 February 2000	1.65 m (5 ft 5 in)		(India)
C	13	Ann Mary Zacariah	14 – 5 November 2003			(India)
	14	Anumaria Chenganamattathil	17 – 15 May 2001			(India)
C	15	Sushantika Chakravortty	18 – 24 August 2000	1.80 m (5 ft 11 in)		(India)

Head coach

- (Serbia) Zoran Višić

Assistant coach(es)

- (India) Thankachan Mulackal Chacko
- (India) Priyanka Bhandari

Legend

- Club – describes current
  club as of tournament
- Age – describes age
  on 28 October 2018

=== Iran ===
Iran women's national under-19 basketball team roster
Players
Coaches

Pos.	No.	Name	Age – Date of birth	Height	Club	Ctr.
SF	4	Fatemeh Aghazadegan Ghazvini	17 – 21 February 2001	1.70 m (5 ft 7 in)		(Iran)
SG	5	Roxana Karimi	15 – 26 November 2002	1.68 m (5 ft 6 in)		(Iran)
SF	6	Hojabralsadati Ghazal	18 – 2 April 2000	1.76 m (5 ft 9 in)		(Iran)
PF	7	Taranom Shahin Zadeh	17 – 28 June 2001	1.68 m (5 ft 6 in)		(Iran)
PG	8	Puonik Hamparsomi Arakilians	17 – 1 February 2001	1.65 m (5 ft 5 in)		(Iran)
PF	9	Zeinab Ghaffari	17 – 8 April 2001	1.79 m (5 ft 10 in)		(Iran)
SF	10	Negin Rasoulipour Khameneh	18 – 6 January 2000	1.76 m (5 ft 9 in)		(Iran)
PF	11	Faezeh Izadi	17 – 19 February 2001	1.72 m (5 ft 8 in)		(Iran)
PG	12	Sahar Goodarzi	16 – 5 March 2002	1.64 m (5 ft 5 in)		(Iran)
C	13	Asal Nastarantehrani	15 – 20 November 2002	1.84 m (6 ft 0 in)		(Iran)
C	14	Aida Golmohammadi	17 – 4 May 2001	1.96 m (6 ft 5 in)		(Iran)
PF	15	Ghazal Maleki	17 – 31 January 2001	1.79 m (5 ft 10 in)		(Iran)

Head coach

- (Iran) Afsaneh Hassan Nayebi

Assistant coach(es)

- (Iran) Shahrzad Rastkarmossaiebe
- (Iran) Neda Askarnia

Legend

- Club – describes current
  club as of tournament
- Age – describes age
  on 28 October 2018

=== Kazakhstan ===
Kazakhstan women's national under-19 basketball team roster
Players
Coaches

Pos.	No.	Name	Age – Date of birth	Height	Club	Ctr.
SG	1	Xeniya Abdurashitova	17 – 18 January 2001	1.68 m (5 ft 6 in)		(Kazakhstan)
SG	2	Alexandra Saitova	18 – 5 January 2000	1.68 m (5 ft 6 in)		(Kazakhstan)
SF	4	Arailym Serikova	17 – 3 March 2001	1.78 m (5 ft 10 in)		(Kazakhstan)
PG	5	Olga Ignatiadi	16 – 23 October 2002	1.60 m (5 ft 3 in)		(Kazakhstan)
PF	11	Yrysty Kassymova	18 – 22 January 2000	1.72 m (5 ft 8 in)		(Kazakhstan)
PF	15	Diana Bushmeleva	17 – 26 August 2001	1.80 m (5 ft 11 in)		(Kazakhstan)
PG	16	Alexandra Komarova	17 – 28 August 2001	1.70 m (5 ft 7 in)		(Kazakhstan)
PG	17	Inna Kulikova	18 – 16 September 2000	1.69 m (5 ft 7 in)		(Kazakhstan)
C	32	Maria Zaitseva	18 – 18 September 2000	1.90 m (6 ft 3 in)		(Kazakhstan)
C	77	Yuliya Marchenko	17 – 14 April 2001	1.85 m (6 ft 1 in)		(Kazakhstan)
SF	88	Valeriya Motovilova	18 – 25 September 2000	1.83 m (6 ft 0 in)		(Kazakhstan)

Head coach

- (Kazakhstan) Alexandr Gussev

Assistant coach(es)

- (Kazakhstan) Irina Bondarenko

Legend

- Club – describes current
  club as of tournament
- Age – describes age
  on 28 October 2018

=== Samoa ===
Samoa women's national under-19 basketball team roster
Players
Coaches

Pos.	No.	Name	Age – Date of birth	Height	Club	Ctr.
F	3	Cherish Manumaleuga	17 – 24 December 2000	1.73 m (5 ft 8 in)		(Samoa)
G	6	Tasiaelasilelagi Stowers	16 – 15 September 2002	1.65 m (5 ft 5 in)		(Samoa)
C	7	Harmony Harder	17 – 22 December 2000	1.90 m (6 ft 3 in)		(Samoa)
G	8	Motu Manumaleuga	16 – 29 April 2002	1.70 m (5 ft 7 in)		(Samoa)
G	10	Kalista Niu	16 – 6 August 2002	1.73 m (5 ft 8 in)		(Samoa)
SF	11	Jana Taufua	16 – 11 January 2002	1.73 m (5 ft 8 in)		(Samoa)
F	14	Talita Taufua	18 – 15 July 2000	1.75 m (5 ft 9 in)		(Samoa)
PF	16	D'Zaiah Siu	15 – 16 November 2002	1.70 m (5 ft 7 in)		(Samoa)
G	28	Sydney Misa	15 – 28 January 2003	1.63 m (5 ft 4 in)		(Samoa)

Head coach

- (Samoa) June Tahata

Assistant coach(es)

- (Samoa) Sonny Au

Legend

- Club – describes current
  club as of tournament
- Age – describes age
  on 28 October 2018

=== Singapore ===
Singapore women's national under-19 basketball team roster
Players
Coaches

Pos.	No.	Name	Age – Date of birth	Height	Club	Ctr.
F	4	Nur Afina Mohamed Israq	15 – 23 May 2003	1.63 m (5 ft 4 in)		(Singapore)
F	5	Amanda Jia Qi Tang	18 – 25 October 2000	1.60 m (5 ft 3 in)		(Singapore)
C	6	Esther Akinfiresoye Damilola Lim	16 – 15 June 2002	1.71 m (5 ft 7 in)		(Singapore)
F	7	Carissa Hui Ern Chan	17 – 22 December 2000	1.70 m (5 ft 7 in)		(Singapore)
G	8	Briana Bao Yu Lee	18 – 3 March 2000	1.70 m (5 ft 7 in)		(Singapore)
F	9	Jia Hui Alicia Quek	18 – 20 January 2000	1.63 m (5 ft 4 in)		(Singapore)
G	10	Shuting Valentia Wong	18 – 18 May 2000	1.65 m (5 ft 5 in)		(Singapore)
C	11	Jia Jing Crystal Yeow	18 – 9 April 2000	1.68 m (5 ft 6 in)		(Singapore)
C	12	Kang Yi Tan	16 – 29 October 2001	1.77 m (5 ft 10 in)		(Singapore)
C	13	Mabel Wen Anton	17 – 29 August 2001	1.78 m (5 ft 10 in)		(Singapore)
F	14	Xingyue Han	17 – 13 December 2000	1.80 m (5 ft 11 in)		(Singapore)
G	15	Tori Chua	15 – 20 May 2003	1.60 m (5 ft 3 in)		(Singapore)

Head coach

- (Singapore) Chiew Poh Leng

Assistant coach(es)

- (Singapore) Lim Bee Lian

Legend

- Club – describes current
  club as of tournament
- Age – describes age
  on 28 October 2018

=== Syria ===
Syria women's national under-19 basketball team roster
Players
Coaches

Pos.	No.	Name	Age – Date of birth	Height	Club	Ctr.
	2	Stefany Atrash	17 – 10 May 2001			(Syria)
	4	Dalaa Hammoud	15 – 29 January 2003			(Syria)
	5	Rawaa Alhaj Ali	18 – 10 January 2000			(Syria)
	6	Yana Afif	14 – 1 January 2004			(Syria)
	7	Noura Bshara	18 – 1 January 2000			(Syria)
	8	Jessica Dmian	18 – 17 June 2000			(Syria)
	9	Nelly Naya Tarzi	18 – 20 June 2000			(Syria)
	11	Julnar Mubarak	15 – 1 January 2003			(Syria)
	13	Seedra Allaw	17 – 13 January 2001			(Syria)
	15	Yara Suliman	17 – 27 February 2001			(Syria)
C	88	Anna Aghananian Aslanian	17 – 8 January 2001	1.88 m (6 ft 2 in)		(Syria)
	99	Sham Otabachi	17 – 27 June 2001			(Syria)

Head coach

- (Syria) Abdullah Kammouneh

Assistant coach(es)

- (Syria) Carla Maghamez
- (Syria) Alizabit Simoun

Legend

- Club – describes current
  club as of tournament
- Age – describes age
  on 28 October 2018
