= India women's national basketball team =

Women's national basketball team representing India

India
- FIBA ranking: 62 ▼2 (18 March 2026)
- Joined FIBA: 1936
- FIBA zone: FIBA Asia
- National federation: Basketball Federation of India
- Coach: (United States) Sarah Gayler
- Nickname: Indian Cagers

Olympic Games
- Appearances: None

World Cup
- Appearances: None

Asia Cup
- Appearances: 21
- Medals: None

Asian Games
- Appearances: 5
- Medals: None

South Asian Championship
- Appearances: 1
- Medals: (2025)
Home	Away
Medal record
Event	1st	2nd	3rd
SABA Championship	1	0	0
Lusofonia Games	0	0	1
South Asian Games	1	0	0
Total	2	0	1
Lusofonia Games
Bronze medal – third place	2014 Goa	
South Asian Games
Gold medal – first place	2019 Kathmandu	
SABA Championship
Gold medal – first place	2025 New Delhi	

The India women's national basketball team represents India in international women's basketball. It is governed by the Basketball Federation of India. At the 2017 FIBA Women's Asia Cup, India was promoted to Division A after beating Kazakhstan 75–73 in the Final.

== Performance record ==
=== Asia Cup ===
Year	Rank	Played	Won	Lost	PF	PA	PD
(Malaysia) 1970	10th	9	0	9	402	906	−504
(Hong Kong) 1980	7th	5	2	3	323	360	−37
(Japan) 1982	9th	4	0	4	191	306	−115
(China) 1984	7th	6	2	4	376	458	−82
(Malaysia) 1986	7th	6	2	4	391	483	−92
(Hong Kong) 1988	8th	8	1	7	444	736	−292
(Singapore) 1990	7th	5	4	1	262	296	−34
(South Korea) 1992	6th	6	1	5	299	603	−304
(Thailand) 1997	9th	4	3	1	293	216	77
(Thailand) 2001	8th	5	3	2	452	388	64
(Japan) 2004	7th	3	2	1	236	217	19
(China) 2005	10th	5	3	2	383	315	68
(South Korea) 2007	7th	6	6	0	568	342	226
(India) 2009	6th	6	1	5	371	553	–182
(Japan) 2011	6th	6	1	5	307	461	–154
(Thailand) 2013	5th	6	2	4	334	493	–159
(China) 2015	6th	6	0	6	314	593	–279
(India) 2017	9th	5	5	0	427	311	116
(India) 2019	8th	4	0	4	225	379	–154
(Jordan) 2021	8th	4	0	4	234	426	–192
(China) 2025	13th	5	3	2	381	376	5
Total	21/31	114	41	73	7,213	9,218	-2,005

=== Asian Games ===
Year	Rank	Played	Won	Lost	PF	PA	PD
(India) 1982	5th	4	0	4	203	449	-246
(China) 2010	7th	3	0	3	137	267	-130
(South Korea) 2014	6th	3	1	2	152	188	-36
(Indonesia) 2018	9th	4	0	4	242	336	-94
(China) 2022	6th	4	2	2	244	315	-71
Total	5/13	18	3	15	978	1,555	-577

=== Commonwealth Games ===
Year	Host	Rank	Played	Won	Lost	PF	PA	PD
2006	Melbourne, Australia	6th	5	2	3	285	379	–94
2018	Gold Coast, Australia	8th	3	0	3	184	241	–57
Total		2/2	8	2	6	469	620	-151

=== South Asian Championship ===
Year	Host	Rank	Played	Won	Lost	PF	PA	PD
2016	Kathmandu, Nepal	Did not participate						
2022	Malé, Maldives	Did not participate						
2025	New Delhi, India	1st	2	2	2	226	57	169

=== South Asian Games ===
Year	Host	Rank	Played	Won	Lost	PF	PA	PD
2019	Kathmandu, Nepal	1st	4	4	0	553	156	397
2027	Lahore, Pakistan	TBD						

=== Lusofonia Games ===
Year	Host	Rank	Played	Won	Lost	PF	PA	PD
2014	Goa, India	3rd	3	1	2	214	203	11

=== William Jones Cup ===
Year	Rank	Played	Won	Lost	PF	PA	PD
(Taiwan) 2011	4th	4	1	3	235	325	-90
(Taiwan) 2017	6th	5	0	5	245	416	-171
(Taiwan) 2018	6th	5	0	5	232	509	-277
Total	3/41	14	1	13	712	1250	-538

== Results and fixtures ==
Win Loss Fixture

=== 2025 ===
23 February 2025 SABA Championship	India	113–32	Nepal	New Delhi
16:00	Scoring by quarter: 23–6, 19–4, 36–9, 35–13
		Report		Arena: KD Jadhav Indoor Stadium

25 February 2025 SABA Championship	India	113–25	Maldives	New Delhi
16:00	Scoring by quarter: 26–8, 30–5, 24–7, 33–5
		Report		Arena: KD Jadhav Indoor Stadium

26 February 2025 SABA Championship	India	107–32	Maldives	New Delhi
19:00	Scoring by quarter: 19–10, 30–7, 27–5, 31–10
		Report		Arena: KD Jadhav Indoor Stadium

13 July 2025 FIBA Asia Cup Div B	Kazakhstan	68–85	India	Shenzhen
14:00	Scoring by quarter: 20–14, 13–25, 14–30, 21–16
		Boxscore		Arena: Shenzhen Bay Sports Center

14 July 2025 FIBA Asia Cup Div B	India	39–83	Chinese Taipei	Shenzhen
14:00	Scoring by quarter: 10–19, 9–20, 10–18, 10–26
		Boxscore		Arena: Shenzhen Bay Sports Center

16 July 2025 FIBA Asia Cup Div B	India	78–55	Tahiti	Shenzhen
11:00	Scoring by quarter: 25–14, 21–12, 15–15, 17–15
		Boxscore		Arena: Shenzhen Bay Sports Center

18 July 2025 FIBA Asia Cup Div B	India	76–93	Thailand	Shenzhen
11:00	Scoring by quarter: 18–20, 15–19, 18–29, 25–25
		Boxscore		Arena: Shenzhen Bay Sports Center

19 July 2025 FIBA Asia Cup Div B	India	103–77	Kazakhstan	Shenzhen
13:30	Scoring by quarter: 26–22, 32–12, 21–26, 24–17
		Boxscore		Arena: Shenzhen Bay Sports Center

== Team ==
=== 2025 roster ===
Roster for the 2025 FIBA Women's Asia Cup Div B.

India women's national basketball team roster
Players
Coaches

Pos.	No.	Name	Age – Date of birth	Height	Club	Ctr.
PG	1	Siya Deodhar	22 – 28 April 2003	1.66 m (5 ft 5 in)	Maharashtra	(India)
PF	3	Sreekala Rani (C)	24 – 19 January 2001	1.75 m (5 ft 9 in)	Kerala	(India)
PG	6	Sathya Krishnamurthi	21 – 25 May 2004	1.70 m (5 ft 7 in)	Railways	(India)
SG	7	Priyanka Prabhakara	26 – 3 October 1998	1.77 m (5 ft 10 in)	Karnataka	(India)
PG	9	Dharshini Thirunavukkarasu	25 – 27 March 2000	1.69 m (5 ft 7 in)	Railways	(India)
SF	10	Susan Florentina	26 – 18 February 1999	1.81 m (5 ft 11 in)	Kerala	(India)
C	11	Aneesha Cleetus	25 – 11 October 1999	1.82 m (6 ft 0 in)	Kerala	(India)
C	13	Anmolpreet Kaur	25 – 24 November 1999	1.85 m (6 ft 1 in)	Yamanashi Queenbees	(Japan)
C	14	Sanjana Ramesh	24 – 12 April 2001	1.79 m (5 ft 10 in)	Karnataka	(India)
C	18	Pushpa Senthil Kumar	23 – 18 September 2001	1.77 m (5 ft 10 in)	Indian Railways	(India)
C	24	Krithika Sureshbabu	22 – 12 November 2002	1.80 m (5 ft 11 in)	Tamil Nadu	(India)
C	27	Sruthy Rathinavel	23 – 27 October 2001	1.81 m (5 ft 11 in)	Tamil Nadu	(India)

Head coach

- (India) Baskar Sappaniambalam

Assistant coach(es)

- (India) Manisha Dange

Legend

- (C) Team captain
- Club – describes last
  club before the tournament
- Age – describes age
  on 13 July 2025

=== Past rosters ===
2025 SABA Women's Championship

2025 SABA Women's Championship

India women's national basketball team roster
Players
Coaches

Pos.	No.	Name	Age – Date of birth	Height	Club	Ctr.
SG	3	Sreekala Rani (C)	24 – 19 January 2001	1.75 m (5 ft 9 in)	Kerala	(India)
PG	6	Sathya Krishnamurthi	20 – 25 May 2004	1.70 m (5 ft 7 in)	Railways	(India)
PG	9	Dharshini Thirunavukkarasu	24 – 27 March 2000	1.69 m (5 ft 7 in)	Railways	(India)
SF	10	Susan Florentina	26 – 18 February 1999	1.81 m (5 ft 11 in)	Kerala	(India)
C	11	Aneesha Cleetus	25 – 11 October 1999	1.82 m (6 ft 0 in)	Kerala	(India)
C	12	Manmeet Kaur	19 – 11 November 2005	1.81 m (5 ft 11 in)	Punjab	(India)
SF	14	Sanjana Ramesh	23 – 12 April 2001	1.79 m (5 ft 10 in)	Karnataka	(India)
PF	15	Harshitha Bopaiah	24 – 31 July 2000	1.77 m (5 ft 10 in)	Railways	(India)
C	24	Krithika Sureshbabu	22 – 12 November 2002	1.80 m (5 ft 11 in)	Tamil Nadu	(India)
C	27	Sruthy Rathinavel	23 – 27 October 2001	1.81 m (5 ft 11 in)	Tamil Nadu	(India)
SG	45	Harima Sundhari	19 – 25 October 2005	1.77 m (5 ft 10 in)	Tamil Nadu	(India)
SG	77	Divyani Gangwal	24 – 2 June 2000	1.70 m (5 ft 7 in)	Madhya Pradesh	(India)

Head coach

- (India) Baskar Sappaniambalam

Assistant coach(es)

- (India) Manisha Dange
- (India) Rohit Kumar

Legend

- (C) Team captain
- Club – describes last
  club before the tournament
- Age – describes age
  on 23 February 2025

2022 Asian Games

2022 Asian Games

India women's national basketball team roster
Players
Coaches

Pos.	No.	Name	Age – Date of birth	Height	Club	Ctr.
C	8	Pushpa Senthil Kumar	22 – 18 September 2001	1.77 m (5 ft 10 in)	Indian Railways	(India)
C	9	Anmolpreet Kaur	23 – 24 November 1999	1.85 m (6 ft 1 in)	Yamanashi Queenbees	(Japan)
F	11	Sreekala Rani	22 – 19 January 2001	1.72 m (5 ft 8 in)	Kerala	(India)
F	12	Manmeet Kaur	17 – 11 November 2005	1.85 m (6 ft 1 in)	Punjab	(India)
C	14	Shireen Limaye (C)	28 – 13 February 1995	1.87 m (6 ft 2 in)	Indian Railways	(India)
C	15	Poonam Chaturvedi	28 – 1 July 1995	2.04 m (6 ft 8 in)	Indian Railways	(India)
G	16	Sahana Shivamogga Mohan	21 – 17 August 2002	1.75 m (5 ft 9 in)	Karnataka	(India)
F	18	Bhandavya Mahesha	25 – 18 April 1998	1.63 m (5 ft 4 in)	Karnataka	(India)
G	19	Madhu Kumari	28 – 9 July 1995	1.65 m (5 ft 5 in)	Indian Railways	(India)
G	20	Kavitha Jose	27 – 10 January 1996	1.65 m (5 ft 5 in)	Kerala SEB	(India)
F	21	Sruthy Rathinavel	21 – 27 October 2001	1.80 m (5 ft 11 in)	Tamil Nadu	(India)
F	24	Sanjana Ramesh	22 – 12 April 2001	1.83 m (6 ft 0 in)	Northern Arizona Lumberjacks	(United States)

Head coach

- (India) Baskar Sappaniambalam

Assistant coach(es)

- (India) Meenalatha Mohan

Legend

- (C) Team captain
- Club – describes last
  club before the tournament
- Age – describes age
  on 27 September 2023

2021 FIBA Women's Asia Cup

2021 FIBA Women's Asia Cup

Roster for the 2021 FIBA Women's Asia Cup.

India women's national basketball team roster
Players
Coaches

Pos.	No.	Name	Age – Date of birth	Height	Club	Ctr.
SG	4	Vaishnavi Yadav	19 – 10 October 2001	1.72 m (5 ft 8 in)	Uttar Pradesh	(India)
SG	5	Shruthi Arvind	25 – 21 February 1996	1.71 m (5 ft 7 in)	Railways	(India)
C	6	Stephy Nixon	29 – 6 June 1992	1.85 m (6 ft 1 in)	KSEB	(India)
PF	8	Sathiya Senthil	24 – 12 June 1997	1.80 m (5 ft 11 in)	Railways	(India)
PF	10	Navaneetha Pattemane	27 – 28 July 1994	1.78 m (5 ft 10 in)	Railways	(India)
SF	11	Sreekala Rani	20 – 19 January 2001	1.75 m (5 ft 9 in)	Kerala	(India)
C	13	Anumaria Chenganamattathil	20 – 15 May 2001	1.82 m (6 ft 0 in)	Kerala	(India)
F	14	Shireen Limaye	26 – 13 February 1995	1.78 m (5 ft 10 in)	Railways	(India)
SF	16	Sahana Shivamogga	19 – 17 August 2002	1.75 m (5 ft 9 in)	Karnataka	(India)
SG	18	Pushpa Senthil	20 – 18 September 2001	1.78 m (5 ft 10 in)	Railways	(India)
PG	19	Madhu Kamari	26 – 9 July 1995	1.64 m (5 ft 5 in)	Railways	(India)
PG	25	Nishanthi Masilamani	21 – 14 October 1999	1.69 m (5 ft 7 in)	Railways	(India)

Head coach

- (Serbia) Zoran Višić

Assistant coach(es)

- (India) Meenalatha Mohan
- (India) Hiranya Murthy

Legend

- Club – describes last
  club before the tournament
- Age – describes age
  on 27 September 2021

2011 FIBA Asia Championship for Women

2011 FIBA Asia Championship for Women

Jersey number	Position	Name	Year of birth	Height (cm)	State
4	FORWARD	Akanksha Singh	1982	168	Delhi
5	CENTER	Kiranjit Kaur	1988	182	Punjab
6	CENTER	Geethu Anna Jose	1985	185	Railways
7	GUARD	Anitha Pauldurai	1985	170	Railways
8	GUARD	Pushpa	1989	173	Railways
9	GUARD	Sonika olhyan	1989	168	Delhi
10	FORWARD	Kritika Laxman	1990	175	Karnataka
11	FORWARD	Smriti	1991	175	Railways
12	FORWARD	Shireen Limaye	1996	175	Maharashtra
13	FORWARD	Raspreet Sidhu	1989	168	Delhi
14	GUARD	Prashanti Singh	1984	173	Delhi
15	FORWARD	Kokila	1990	168	Tamil Nadu

Coaching Staff

- (India) Pete Guadet – Head Coach women team 2011
- Abdul Hamid Khan – Asstt. Coach
- Trainer – Zack

2009 FIBA Asia Championship for Women

2009 FIBA Asia Championship for Women

Jersey number	Position	Name	Year of birth	Height (cm)	State
4	FORWARD	Akanksha Singh	1989	174	Delhi
5	CENTER	Kiranjit Kaur	1988	182	Punjab
6	CENTER	Geethu Anna Jose	1985	185	Railways
7	GUARD	Varun Bahl	1985	170	Slums
8	GUARD	Pratima Singh	1990	173	Delhi
9	GUARD	Sonika olhyan	1989	168	Delhi
10	FORWARD	Kritika Laxman	1990	175	Karnataka
11	GUARD	Anju Lakra	1983	164	Railways
12	GUARD	Harjeet Kaur	1986	186	Delhi
13	FORWARD	Raspreet Sidhu	1989	168	Delhi
14	GUARD	Prashanti Singh	1984	173	Delhi
15	FORWARD	Shiba Maggon	1976	173	Delhi

Coaching Staff

- (India) Jay Prakash Singh – Head Coach women team 2009

2007 FIBA Asia Championship for Women

2007 FIBA Asia Championship for Women

The following is the Indian women squad that participated in the 2007 FIBA Asia Championship for Women in Korea.

Jersey number	Position	Name	Year of birth	Height (cm)	State
4	FORWARD	Divya Singh	1982	174	Delhi
5	CENTER	Kiranjit Kaur	1988	182	Punjab
6	CENTER	Geethu Anna Jose	1985	185	Railways
7	GUARD	Anitha Pauldurai	1985	170	Railways
8	GUARD	Manisha Kaprekar	1979	170	Railways
9	GUARD	Akanksha Singh	1989	168	Delhi
10	FORWARD	Rashmi Channegowda	1986	176	Maharashtra
11	GUARD	Anju Lakra	1983	164	Railways
12	GUARD	Bharti Netam	1986	165	Chhattisgarh
13	FORWARD	Raspreet Sidhu	1989	168	Delhi
14	GUARD	Prashanti Singh	1984	173	Delhi
15	FORWARD	Seema Singh	1983	176	Railways

Coaching staff

- (India) Sat Prakash Yadav – Head Coach women team
- (India) Dimal C Mathew – Asst Coach

== Former players ==
- Geethu Anna Jose
- Prashanti Singh
- Akanksha Singh
- Shireen Limaye
- Manisha Dange
- Anitha Pauldurai

== See also ==
- India men's national basketball team
- India women's national under-19 basketball team
- India women's national under-17 basketball team
- India women's national 3x3 team
