= Susan Florentina =

Indian basketball player (born 1999)

Susan Florentina Saji (born 18 February 1999) is an Indian basketball player from Kerala. She plays for the India women's national basketball team as a power forward. She plays for Kerala and Kerala State Electricity Board team in the domestic tournaments.

== Early life and education ==
Florentina is from Idukki but is a resident of Thiruvananthapuram, Kerala. She is the daughter of late Saji TV and Elizabeth John. She did her graduation at Alphonsa College in Pala, Kottayam. Her height caught the attention of her teacher Smithesh Johnson, who suggested her parents to send her for playing basketball. She learnt her basics under her first coach Biju D Theman and started enjoying the game. Later, she worked hard at college under coach Martin Mathew and was selected for the Kerala State Electricity Board team. She currently trains under coach Aju Jacob.

== Career ==
Florentina is selected for the Indian team in the 3rd South Asian Basketball Association Women's Championship 2025 qualifiers at New Delhi from 23 to 26 February 2025. The Indian team played Maldives and Nepal for a berth in the FIBA women's Asia Cup. She made her senior India debut in the first match, where India defeated Nepal 113–32, on 23 February 2025 at Delhi. And she also played the second match and the final, against Maldives.

Earlier in 2025, she was part of the Kerala team which bagged the silver medal at the National Games 2025. She was also part of the Kerala team that won a silver medal in the 74th Senior National Basketball Championship at Bhavnagar, Gujarat in January 2025. In the final against Railways, she scored 17 points and Sreekala garnered 18, but they lost the title 86–53. In the semifinal against Delhi, Florentina ably assisted her captain Sreekala (25 points), by scoring 12 points, 16 rebounds and five blocks.

In January 2025, she was part of the Kerala team that won the 4th 3x3 Senior National Basketball Championship 2024 for Women. Earlier in September 2024, she played for KSEB which finished runners up in the 5th Kerala Senior State 3x3 Basketball Championship.
