= Basketball at the 2022 Asian Games =

- Venue: Deqing Geographic Information Park; Hangzhou Olympic Expo Center Gymnasium; Zijingang Campus Gymnasium; Shaoxing Olympic Center Gymnasium
- Dates: 25 September – 6 October 2023
- Nations: 27

Basketball at the 2022 Asian Games was held in Hangzhou, China from 25 September to 6 October 2023. There were two contested events: 5x5 and 3x3 basketball.

== Schedule ==
P	Preliminary round	R	Round of 16	¼	Quarterfinals	½	Semifinals	F	Finals

Event↓/Date →	25th Mon	26th Tue	27th Wed	28th Thu	29th Fri	30th Sat		1st Sun		2nd Mon	3rd Tue	4th Wed	5th Thu	6th Fri
Basketball
Men		P		P		P				R	¼	½		F
Women			P		P			P		¼	½		F	
3x3 basketball
Men	P	P	P	P	P	R	¼	½	F					
Women	P		P		P	R	¼	½	F					

== Medalists ==
=== Basketball ===
Event	Gold	Silver	Bronze
Men	Philippines; Chris Newsome; Kevin Alas; Scottie Thompson; Arvin Tolentino; Chris Ross; Marcio Lassiter; June Mar Fajardo; CJ Perez; Calvin Oftana; Japeth Aguilar; Justin Brownlee; Ange Kouame	Jordan; Fadi Qarmash; Freddy Ibrahim; Ashraf Al-Hendi; Ahmad Al-Hamarsheh; Sami Bzai; Ahmad Hammouri; Mohammad Hussein; Hashem Abbas; Malek Kanaan; Rondae Hollis-Jefferson; John Bohannon; Ahmad Al-Dwairi	China; Hu Mingxuan; Zhao Jiwei; Cheng Shuaipeng; Zhao Rui; Fu Hao; Yu Jiahao; Du Runwang; Cui Yongxi; Hu Jinqiu; Zhu Junlong; Wang Zhelin; Zhang Zhenlin
Women	China; Li Yuan; Wang Siyu; Yang Shuyu; Yang Liwei; Jin Weina; Li Meng; Zhang Ru; Huang Sijing; Pan Zhenqi; Luo Xinyu; Li Yueru; Han Xu	Japan; Mai Kawai; Maki Takada; Minami Yabu; Azusa Asahina; Nako Motohashi; Saki Hayashi; Aika Hirashita; Saori Miyazaki; Anri Hoshi; Nanako Todo; Himawari Akaho; Monica Okoye	South Korea; Shin Ji-hyun; Kang Lee-seul; An He-ji; Lee So-hee; Park Ji-su; Lee Kyung-eun; Kang Yoo-lim; Park Ji-hyun; Lee Hae-ran; Kim Dan-bi; Yang In-young; Jin An

=== 3x3 basketball ===
Event	Gold	Silver	Bronze
Men	Chinese Taipei; Yu Xiang-ping; Chiang Chun; Wang Jhe-yu; Lin Sin-kuan	Qatar; Hamad Yassin Mousa; Omar Mohamed Saad; Mohammed Abbasher; Ahmad Saeid Mohamad	Mongolia; Lkhagvaagiin Avirmed; Batzorigiin Sükhbat; Myagmarsürengiin Ölzii-Orshikh; Tsermaagiin Batzayaa
Women	China; Wang Jiahui; Chen Mingling; Wan Jiyuan; Wang Xinyu	Mongolia; Bat-Erdeniin Ariuntsetseg; Tsendjavyn Bolortsetseg; Ölziibatyn Indra; Erdenebayangiin Narangoo	Japan; Nanami Seki; Momoka Hanashima; Karin Imori; Mayu Kubota

== Medal table ==
Rank	Nation	Gold	Silver	Bronze	Total
1	China (CHN)	2	0	1	3
2	Chinese Taipei (TPE)	1	0	0	1
2	Philippines (PHI)	1	0	0	1
4	Japan (JPN)	0	1	1	2
4	Mongolia (MGL)	0	1	1	2
6	Jordan (JOR)	0	1	0	1
6	Qatar (QAT)	0	1	0	1
8	South Korea (KOR)	0	0	1	1
Totals (8 entries)		4	4	4	12

== Draw ==
Qualification was to be held for both men's and women's tournament but was scrapped by June 2023. 23 men's teams and 16 women's teams had registered to take part in the Games but the organizers decided to pick the best 16 men's teams and 12 women's teams directly from the FIBA World Ranking.

=== Men ===
The teams were distributed in four groups using the serpentine system, according to the February 2023 FIBA Men's World Ranking.

Group A

- Iran (22)
- Kazakhstan (65)
- Saudi Arabia (68)
- United Arab Emirates (106)

Group B

- China (27)
- ~~Lebanon (43)~~*
- Chinese Taipei (69)
- Mongolia (104)

Group C

- Jordan (33)
- Philippines (40)
- Bahrain (84)
- Thailand (94)

Group D

- Japan (36)
- South Korea (38)
- Indonesia (85)
- Qatar (89)

* On 16 September 2023, it was announced that Hong Kong (World rank 112) would replace Lebanon which withdrew their team from the Asian Games due to injuries.

=== Women ===
The teams were distributed in three groups using the serpentine system, according to the February 2023 FIBA Women's World Ranking.

Group A

- China (2)
- India (57)
- Indonesia (63)
- Mongolia (—)

Group B

- Japan (9)
- Philippines (42)
- Kazakhstan (64)
- Hong Kong (103)

Group C

- South Korea (12)
- Chinese Taipei (33)
- North Korea (86)
- Thailand (101)

== Final standing ==
=== Basketball ===
==== Men ====
Rank	Team	Pld	W	L
1st place, gold medalist(s)	Philippines	7	6	1
2nd place, silver medalist(s)	Jordan	6	5	1
3rd place, bronze medalist(s)	China	6	5	1
4	Chinese Taipei	7	4	3
5	Iran	6	5	1
6	Saudi Arabia	7	4	3
7	South Korea	7	4	3
8	Japan	6	3	3
9	Qatar	4	1	3
10	Bahrain	4	1	3
11	Kazakhstan	4	1	3
12	Hong Kong	4	1	3
13	United Arab Emirates	3	0	3
14	Mongolia	3	0	3
15	Indonesia	3	0	3
16	Thailand	3	0	3

==== Women ====
Rank	Team	Pld	W	L
1st place, gold medalist(s)	China	6	6	0
2nd place, silver medalist(s)	Japan	6	5	1
3rd place, bronze medalist(s)	South Korea	6	5	1
4	North Korea	6	3	3
5	Philippines	4	2	2
6	India	4	2	2
7	Chinese Taipei	4	1	3
8	Indonesia	4	1	3
9	Hong Kong	3	1	2
10	Mongolia	3	0	3
11	Thailand	3	0	3
12	Kazakhstan	3	0	3

=== 3x3 basketball ===
==== Men ====
Rank	Team	Pld	W	L
1st place, gold medalist(s)	Chinese Taipei	8	7	1
2nd place, silver medalist(s)	Qatar	7	6	1
3rd place, bronze medalist(s)	Mongolia	7	5	2
4	South Korea	7	4	3
5	China	4	3	1
6	Japan	6	4	2
7	Iran	6	4	2
8	Philippines	6	4	2
9	Kazakhstan	5	3	2
10	India	4	2	2
11	Thailand	5	2	3
12	Macau	4	1	3
13	Hong Kong	4	1	3
14	Turkmenistan	4	1	3
15	Cambodia	4	1	3
16	Malaysia	3	0	3
17	Kyrgyzstan	4	0	4
18	Jordan	4	0	4
19	Maldives	4	0	4

==== Women ====
Rank	Team	Pld	W	L
1st place, gold medalist(s)	China	5	5	0
2nd place, silver medalist(s)	Mongolia	6	5	1
3rd place, bronze medalist(s)	Japan	7	5	2
4	Chinese Taipei	6	4	2
5	South Korea	4	3	1
6	Thailand	5	2	3
7	Kazakhstan	5	2	3
8	India	4	1	3
9	Jordan	4	2	2
10	Malaysia	4	2	2
11	Uzbekistan	3	1	2
12	Hong Kong	4	1	3
13	Maldives	3	0	3
14	Nepal	3	0	3
—	Philippines	3	0	3
