= Harima Sundhari =

Indian basketball player (born 2005)

Harima Sundhari Munishkannan (born 25 October 2005) is an Indian basketball player from Tamil Nadu. She plays for the India women's national basketball team as a shooting guard. She plays for Tamil Nadu in the domestic tournaments.

== Early life and career ==
Sundhari is from Tamil Nadu.

In February 2025, she is selected for the Indian team to play the 3rd South Asian Basketball Association Women's Championship 2025 qualifiers at New Delhi from 23 to 26 February 2025. The Indian team played Maldives and Nepal and won both the matches for a berth in the FIBA women's Asia Cup. She played both the matches, and the final against Maldives, at Delhi.

In January 2025, she played the 74th Senior National Basketball Championship for Tamil Nadu team which won bronze medal at Bhavnagar. She scored 22 points against Delhi. In February 2025, she played for the Tamil Nadu team that won the National Games beating Kerala in the final. Earlier in 2022, she played the FIBA Under-18 Women's Asian Championship 2022 Division A and the FIBA Under 16 Women's Asian Championship 2021 Division A.
