= Aneesha Cleetus =

Indian basketball player (born 1999)

Aneesha Cleetus (born 11 October 1999) is an Indian basketball player from Kerala. She plays for the India women's national basketball team as a center. She plays for Kerala and Kerala State Electricity Board teams in the domestic tournaments.

== Early life and career ==
Cleetus is from Kottayam, Kerala. In 2019, she made her senior India debut in FIBA Women's Olympic Pre-Qualifying Asian tournament.

In February 2025, she was part of the Indian team for the 3rd South Asian Basketball Association Women's Championship qualifiers at New Delhi. The Indian team played Maldives and Nepal for a berth in the FIBA women's Asia Cup and she played both the matches, and the final against Maldives, at Delhi.

She was part of the Kerala team which bagged the silver medal at the National Games 2025. She also played the 74th Senior National Basketball Championship as part of the silver winning Kerala women team. She is also part of the 3x3 games and is ranked 21 in India. She was selected to play the 7th FIBA 3x3 Asia Cup in March 2024 at Singapore.
