= Divyani Gangwal =

Indian basketball player (born 2000)

Divyani Gangwal (born 2 June 2000) is an Indian basketball player from Madhya Pradesh. She plays for the India women's national basketball team as a shooting guard. She played for Madhya Pradesh in the domestic tournaments and from 2023, she is representing Chhattisgarh state.

== Early life ==
Gangwal is from Neemuch, Malwa region, Madhya Pradesh.

== International career ==
In February 2025, she is selected for the Indian team to play the 3rd South Asian Basketball Association Women's Championship 2025 qualifiers at New Delhi from 23 to 26 February 2025. The Indian team played Maldives and Nepal for a berth in the FIBA women's Asia Cup. She made her senior India debut on 23 February 2025 in the match against Nepal at Delhi. Later, she played both the other matches, including the final against Maldives, at Delhi.

== Domestic career ==
Gangwal started as a junior player and took part in the School Games Federation of India Nationals at Kolhapur, Maharashtra in 2012, Gotan, Rajasthan in 2013, and Visakhapatnam, Andhra Pradesh in 2014. In 2013, she was also part of the Madhya Pradesh team that won the bronze medal in the Sub Junior Nationals at Patna, Bihar. She progressed to Youth Nationals, which she played at Bhavnagar, Gujarat in 2015. She was part of the team that won gold medal twice in the KV Nationals in 2016 and 2017. She played her maiden Senior National Basketball Championship at Ludhiana in 2019 where she got a bronze medal. In 2025, she played the Senior National Basketball Championship for Chhattisgarh.

In 2013, she was selected for the sub junior India National camp at Gandhinagar and Youth India Camp at Noida, U.P. in 2016 ahead of FIBA Asian basketball Championship in Indonesia. She was also in the Indian Schools Basketball camp in 2017 and played the schools league.
