= Krithika Sureshbabu =

Indian basketball player (born 2002)

Krithika Sureshbabu (born 12 November 2002) is an Indian basketball player from Tamil Nadu. She plays for the India women's national basketball team as a center. She plays for Tamil Nadu in the domestic tournaments.

== Early life and career ==
Krithika is from Chennai, Tamil Nadu.

In February 2025, she is selected for the Indian team to play the 3rd South Asian Basketball Association Women's Championship 2025 qualifiers at New Delhi from 23 to 26 February 2025. The Indian team played Maldives and Nepal and won both the matches for a berth in the FIBA women's Asia Cup. She made her senior India debut in the first match against Nepal which India won 113–32 at Delhi. She also played the next two matches, against Maldives, including the final.

In January 2025, she played for Tamil Nadu in the 4th 3x3 Senior National Basketball Championship. She also represented Tamil Nadu state that came third in the 74th Senior National Basketball Championship at Bhavnagar, Gujarat, in January 2025.
