= Harshitha Bopaiah =

Indian basketball player (born 2000)

Kelettira Harshitha Bojamma Bopaiah (born 31 July 2000) is an Indian basketball player from Karnataka. She plays for the India women's national basketball team as a power forward. She plays for Railways in the domestic tournaments and for Karnataka in the National Games.

== Early life and education ==
Bopaiah is from Napoklu, Kodagu, Karnataka. She was born to Mandepanda Mala Bopaiah and Dore Bopaiah, who was a state hockey player. She studied at Sri Rama Trust English Medium School, Napoklu before doing her BCom at ShaShib college, Bengaluru. She is currently studying at Reva University and plays for their team in college events. As a school student, she first took to athletics and did well in high jump and long jump events. But on the suggestion of her athletics coach K. Satyanarayana, she shifted to basketball. In 2013, at the Mysuru Department of Youth Empowerment and Sports run hostel selection trials for admission, she was selected for both athletics and basketball. But she opted for the latter, and in 2014 started playing for Karnataka in the Nationals.

== Career ==
In February 2025, she is selected for the Indian team to play the 3rd South Asian Basketball Association Women's Championship 2025 qualifiers at New Delhi from 23 to 26 February 2025. The Indian team played Maldives and Nepal and won both the matches for a berth in the FIBA women's Asia Cup. She played both the matches, and the final against Maldives, at Delhi.

Earlier in 2017, Bopaiah was selected for the Indian team to play the ISF World School Games at Croatia and later for the National team for the FIBA 3x3 Under 18 Asia Cup in Malaysia. In October 2018, she also played the FIBA Under 18 Women's Asian Championship at Sri Kanteerava Stadium, Bengaluru, where India clinched a place for Division A.
