= Sruthy Rathinavel =

Indian basketball player (born 2001)

Sruthy Rathinavel (born 27 October 2001) is an Indian basketball player from Tamil Nadu. She plays for the India women's national basketball team as a center. She plays for Tamil Nadu in the domestic tournaments.

== Early life and education ==
Sruthy is from Tamil Nadu. She is studying MA at MOP Vaishnav college. She is doing her post graduation in public policy. She did her Class 10 at Madurai Yadava College when her coach Sampath noticed and introduced her to basketball. She shifted to Lady Sivaswamy Ayyar Girls’ Higher Secondary School, Mylapore, to improve her basketball. She lost her mother in her seventh class when she was 12 years and her father, a hockey player, died in 2019. She has a brother, Venkat.

== Career ==
Sruthy was selected for the Indian team to play the 3rd South Asian Basketball Association Women's Championship 2025 qualifiers at New Delhi from 23 to 26 February 2025. The Indian team played Maldives and Nepal for a berth in the FIBA women's Asia Cup. She played both the matches, and the final against Maldives at Delhi.

She also represented India at the 2022 Asian Games but as a junior player did not get enough minutes on the court.
