= Meenalatha Mohan =

Indian basketball player and coach

Meenalatha Mohan (born 23 March 1978) is a former Indian basketball player and coach from Tamil Nadu. She played for the India women's national basketball team and the Indian Railways teams in the domestic tournaments. She also coached the Indian women's 5x5 team for the Asian Games 2022 at Hangzhou.

== Early life ==
Mohan is born in Chengalpattu, Tamil Nadu. She did her schooling at St. Mary's School, Chengalpattu and learnt her basics at the Premium Basketball Club.

== Career ==
Mohan started as a club player and played for her school in Chengalpattu, a rural town in Tamil Nadu. At 18 years, she joined Southern Railways, a premier basketball team, in 1996 and represented India in the Asian Basketball Championships for women in 1997.

In 1994, she played a key role in Tamil Nadu winning their first Junior National title and she was also part of her state team that won the Junior Nationals for a second time in 1996. After joining the Southern Railways, she was selected for the Indian Railways team which she represented for many years. She won the Senior National Basketball Championship for women six times as part of the Indian Railways team. One of her early National titles came on 1 January 2000, where Indian Railways won their 11th National title at the National Basketball Championship in New Delhi. She represented India at the 2001 Asian Championship for Women.

=== Coaching career ===
In 2021, Mohan's first assignment as an assistant coach with the Indian team was for the FIBA Women's Asia Cup 2021 in Amman, Jordan, where Indian women finished 8th under chief coach Serbian Zoran Višić.
