= Siya Deodhar =

Indian basketball player

Personal information
- Nationality: Indian
- Born: 28 April 2003 (age 23) Dharampeth, Nagpur, Maharashtra, India
- Occupation: Basketball player
- Years active: 2018–present

Sport
- Sport: Basketball, 3x3 basketball
- Position: Point guard
- Team: India women's national basketball team, Maharashtra (domestic)

Siya Deodhar (28 April 2003) is an Indian basketball player from Maharashtra. She plays for the India women's national basketball team as a point guard. She plays for Maharashtra team in the domestic tournaments. She also plays 3x3 basketball.

== Early life ==
Deodhar is from Dharampeth, Nagpur, Maharashtra, India. She is born to Shreesh and Swati. She learnt her basics at Shivaji Nagar Gymkhana under coaches Shatrughna Gokhale and Vinay Chikate, both Chhatrapati awardees.

== Career ==
Deodhar was selected to play for the Indian senior 3x3 basketball team at the 19th Asian Games 2023 held at Hangzhou, China, along with Anu Maria Shaju, Yashneet Kaur and Vaishnavi Yadav.

In August 2020, she was selected for high school basketball programme in Kansas. She got a scholarship to study and play in the US and was signed up by Life Prep Academy in Wichita, Kansas, along with Ann Mary Zachariah of Kerala. She became the fourth female player to play high school basketball in the United States after Asmat Kaur Taunque, Harsimran Kaur and Zachariah.

She also took part in the NBA Academy India women's camps in May 2018, January and October 2019.

In July 2025, she was selected to represent the Senior India women's team in the FIBA Asia Cup basketball Division B tournament to be held in Shenzhen, China, from July 13 to 20.

== Awards ==
She got the BWB All Star in the 2018 BWB Asia 2018 Women and 2019 BWB Asia 2019 Women.
