= Manisha Dange =

Indian basketball player and coach (born 1979)

Manisha Kaprekar Dange (born 8 December 1979) is a former Indian basketball player and coach from Maharashtra. She played for the India women's national basketball team and the Central Railway and Indian Railways teams in the domestic tournaments as a shooting guard.

== Early life ==
Dange is from Thane, Mumbai. She is the daughter of Shubhangi Kaprekar (mother) and Shridhar Kaprekar. She married Satyajit Dange. She started playing at a very young age at a local club AVS Agradneya Vyayamshala under coach Milind Apte. She was one of the first players to join Central Railways in sports quota from her club in 2001.

== Playing career ==
She started with the Maharashtra state team and played for them till 1999 and later joined the Central Railways, for whom she played for many years. She played the FIBA Asia Championship for women in South Korea in 2007 and 2013. In 2007, she also played in an invitational tournament in Malaysia. She made a comeback in 2013, after a 7–year hiatus, and won gold in the inaugural FIBA Asia 3×3 Basketball Championship at Doha.

== Coaching career ==
Currently, she is the assistant coach to the Senior India team, which played the 3rd South Asian Basketball Association Women's Championship 2025 at Delhi against Nepal and Maldives in February 2025 from Femme Times Media and most-desirable Sportsperson of the Year 2023 award from Diva Planet Magazine.

== Records ==
She holds the record for the longest basketball shot in the individual female category. It is recorded by both the Indian Book of Records and the Limca Book of Records 2023. The single–handed long basketball shot, from a distance of 23 meters, was achieved on 1 October 2021 at Thane, Mumbai.
