= Kokoro Tanaka =

Japanese basketball player

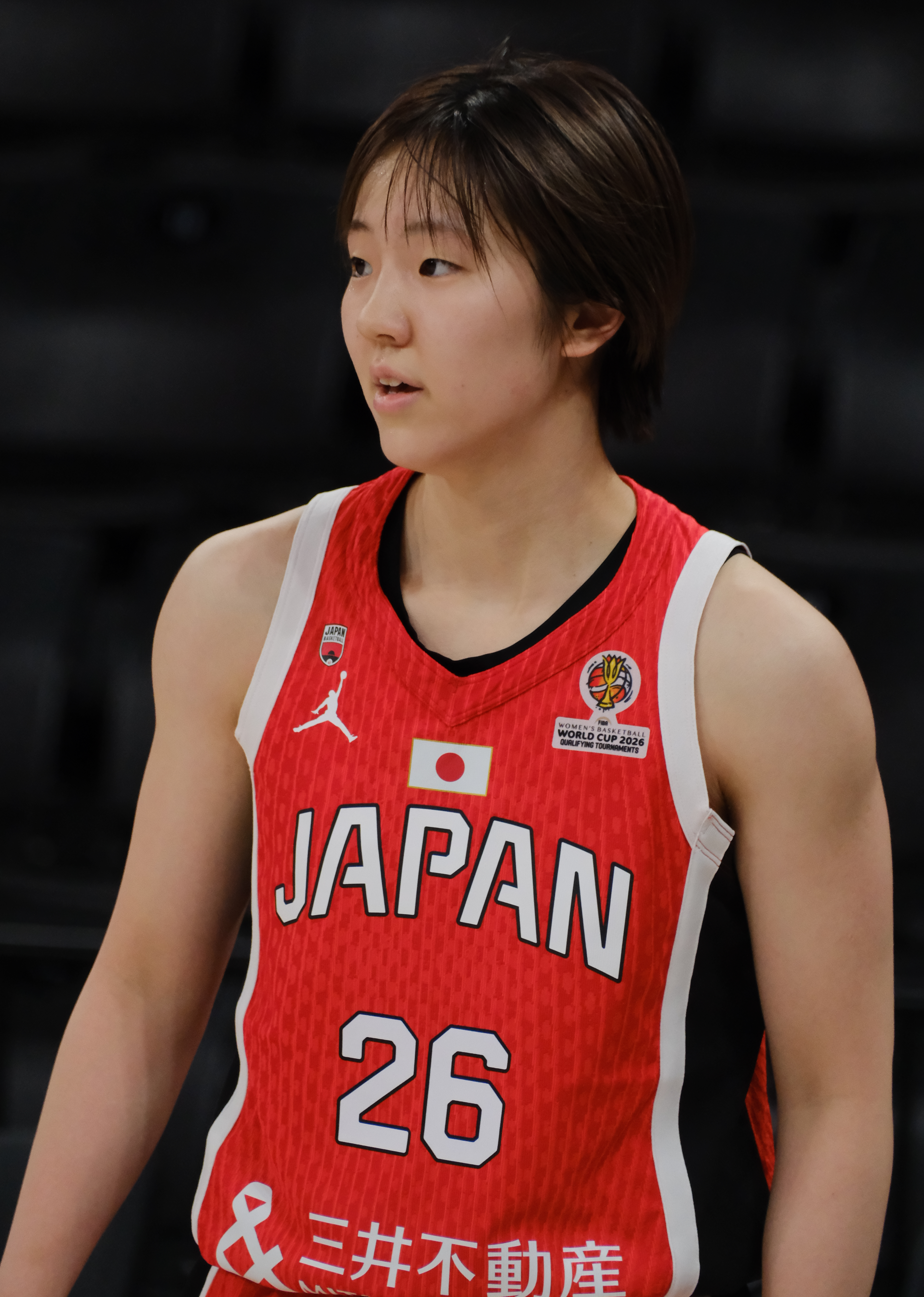

No. 26 – Eneos Sunflowers
- Position: Shooting guard
- League: Women's Japan Basketball League

Personal information
- Born: 10 January 2006 (age 20) Osaka Prefecture, Japan
- Listed height: 5 ft 8 in (1.73 m)

Career information
- WNBA draft: 2026: 3rd round, 38th overall pick
- Drafted by: Golden State Valkyries
- Playing career: 2024–present

Career history
- 2024–present: Eneos Sunflowers
- Stats at Basketball Reference

Kokoro Tanaka (田中 こころ, Tanaka Kokoro) (born 10 January 2006) is a Japanese professional basketball player for the Eneos Sunflowers of the Women's Japan Basketball League. She was drafted 38th overall by the Golden State Valkyries in the 2026 WNBA draft.

== Playing career ==
Tanaka joined the Eneos Sunflowers of the Women's Japan Basketball League in 2024, and recorded 11 points, 2 assists, and 2 steals at the opening game.

She averaged 5.7 points, 2.0 rebounds, and 2.5 assists per game during the 2025–26 W League season.

On 14 April 2026, Tanaka was selected 38th overall by the Golden State Valkyries in the 2026 WNBA draft. Golden State Valkyries announced that she would not join the team in order to focus on the World Cup and W League.

== National team career ==
Tanaka was selected for the Japanese national team for the first time in 2025. She helped the team win silver at the 2025 FIBA Women's Asia Cup and selected as one of the All-Star Five, where she averaged 14.8 points, 2.5 rebounds, 5.5 assists, and 1.2 steals per game.
