= Anmolpreet Kaur =

Indian basketball player

Anmolpreet Kaur Pannu (24 November 1999) is an Indian basketball player from Punjab. She plays for the India women's national basketball team as a guard. She plays for Punjab team in the domestic tournaments. She also plays 3x3 basketball.

== Early life and education ==
Kaur is from Rountan village, Shahpur Nakodar, Jalandhar, India. But during childhood she was a resident of Phillaur, Punjab, where her father, Parminder Singh, used to work as an assistant sub-inspector. She joined the Ludhiana Basketball Academy after finishing her Class 10 and used to travel regularly to Ludhiana, as her mother Jasvir Kaur was very protective. She did her schooling at Saint Joseph Convent School in her home town but moved to a hostel in Ludhiana and joined Malwa Khalsa Senior Secondary Girls School to hone her basketball. She trained under coach Teja Singh Dhaliwal at the Ludhiana Academy.

== Career ==
At 14, Kaur's first big tournament was the 2015 Youth Nationals where she represented Punjab. In March 2016, she became the first girl from India to be selected for a three year scholarship programme to train at the basketball academy, Tou Gakuen High School, Tokyo, and to play high school basketball in Japan.

In July 2017, she made her debut for the senior India team, representing the country in the FIBA Women’s Asia Cup in 2017 Division B, which India won at Bengaluru. She also played for India again in the 2019 FIBA Women's Asia Cup Division A.

In August 2018, she was selected for the Indian team to take part in the Asian Games, Jakarta, Indonesia.

In December 2022, she joined the Yamanashi Queenbees, one of the teams in Japan’s premier professional basketball league, the WJBL.
