= Sakshi Sharma =

Indian kabaddi player

Sakshi Sharma (born 2004) is an Indian kabaddi player from Himachal Pradesh. She plays for the Indian women's national kabaddi team and for Himachal Pradesh in the domestic tournaments. She is a defender.

== Early life and education ==
Sharma is from Maharal village, Sirmaur district, but resides at Hamirpur, Himachal Pradesh. Her father Pradeep Sharma is a lineman in the Himachal Pradesh Electricity Department. She did her master's in English at Chandigarh University.

== Career ==
In 2015, Sharma joined the Himachal Pradesh Sports Hostel. In 2024, she was part of the gold winning Chandigarh University in the 4th Khelo India University Games. Earlier, she represented Himachal University in the first Khelo India University Games at Odisha and won a gold. She also won a silver medal in the third edition at Uttar Pradesh also for Himachal University. In March 2023, she captained the Himachal Pradesh state team at the 69th Women's Senior National Kabaddi Championship held at Haryana.

She was a part of the Indian women's national kabaddi team that won gold in the Women's Kabaddi World Cup 2025 held in Bangladesh in November 2025.
