= Sanjana Ramesh =

Indian basketball player (born 2001)

Karnataka
- Position: Small forward
- League: INBC

Personal information
- Born: April 12, 2001 (age 25) Chennai, Tamil Nadu, India
- Listed height: 5 ft 10 in (1.78 m)

Career information
- Playing career: 2017–present

Career history
- 2017–: Karnataka
- 2019–2023: Northern Arizona Lumberjacks
Medals
Representing India
SABA Championship
Gold medal – first place	2025 New Delhi	Team

Sanjana Ramesh (born 12 April 2001) is an Indian basketball player from Bengaluru. She plays for the India national basketball team and the Karnataka in the Indian National Championships. She also represented Northern Arizona Lumberjacks of the Big Sky Conference. She was part of the Indian women's team in the 2022 Asian Games at Hangzhou, China.

== Early life ==
Sanjana was born in Chennai and grew up in Bangalore, Karnataka. She attended Delhi Public School (South), Bengaluru. Sanjana started playing basketball because her school did not have a football team. She wanted to prove as a sportswoman to her brother, a footballer, and ended up taking basketball as a career.

== College career ==
In November 2018, Sanjana signed to play college basketball at Northern Arizona University, becoming the second Indian female basketball player to earn an NCAA Division I scholarship after Kavita Akula, who enrolled at Grand Canyon University in 2017. In 2020, Sanjana received the Golden Eagle Scholar-Athlete Award recipient.

== National team career ==
Sanjana captained the India women's national under-16 basketball team at the 2017 FIBA U16 Women's Asian Championship. She helped India win Division B and the country earned a spot in Division A. At the development camp of Basketball Without Borders Asia, Sanjana was awarded the Most Valuable Player that helped her get the US college scholarship.

She was selected to play in the Indian team in the 3rd South Asian Basketball Association Women's Championship 2025 qualifiers at New Delhi from 23 to 26 February 2025. The Indian team played Maldives and Nepal for a berth in the FIBA women's Asia Cup. In the first match, India beat Nepal 113–32 on 23 February 2025. She played both the matches.

In July 2025, she was part of the Indian team at the FIBA Women's Asia Cup 2025 Division B at Shenzhen, China. In the first match on 13 July 2025, India beat Kazakhstan 85–68 in the Group A opener.
