= Sahana Shivamogga Mohan =

Indian basketball player

Personal information
- Born: August 17, 2002 (age 24)
- Listed height: 175 cm (5 ft 9 in)
- Position: Point guard

Sahana Shivamogga Mohan (born 17 August 2002) is an Indian basketball player who plays point guard.

In 2021, she joined the Indian National Senior Team and played in the FIBA Women's Asia Cup Division A. She also played for India on the women's 5x5 basketball team at the 2022 Asian Games in Hangzhou, China.

She hails from Karnataka.
