= Sathya Krishnamurthi =

Indian basketball player (born 2004)

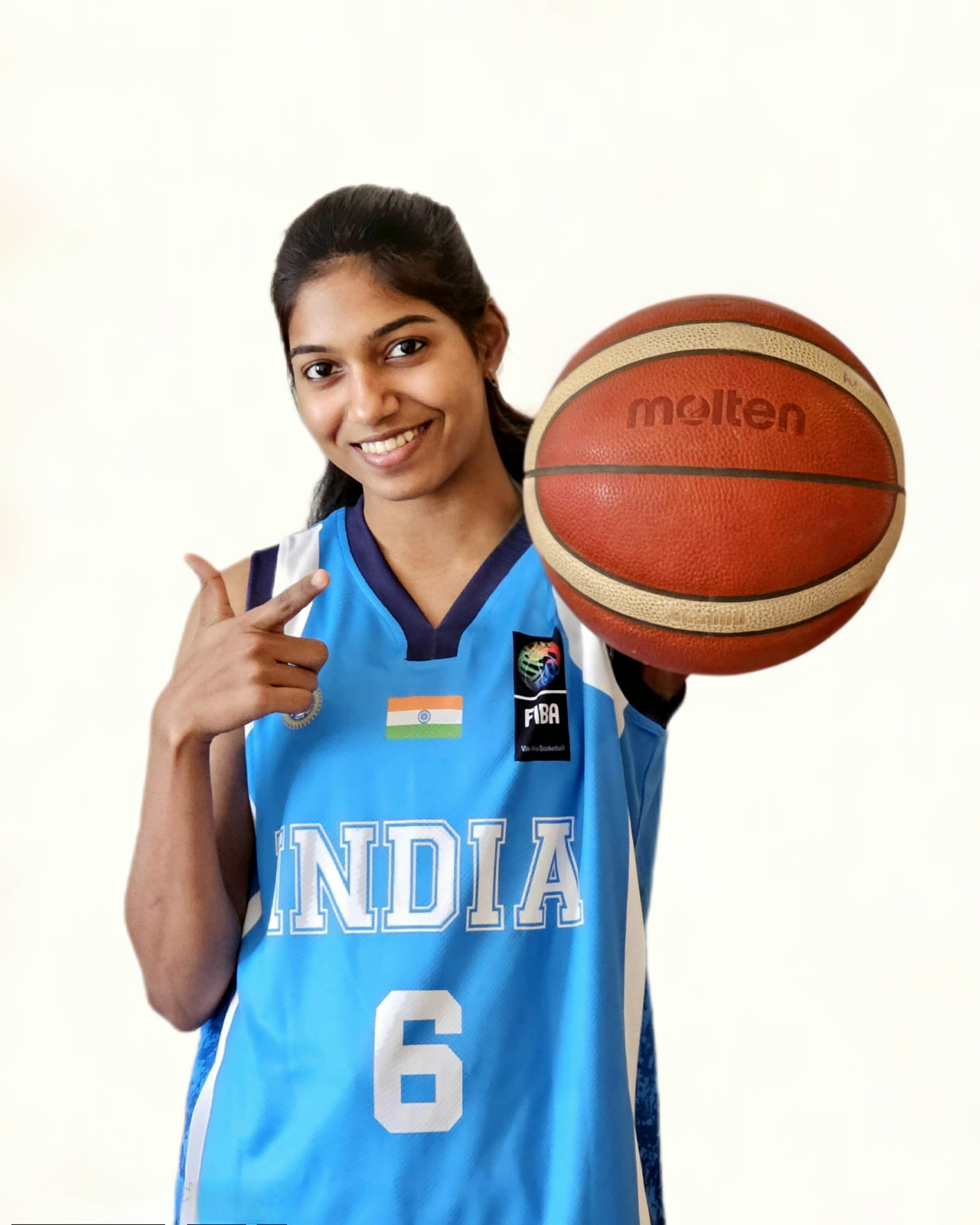
Sathya Krishnamurthi

Sathya Krishnamurthi (born 25 May 2004) is an Indian basketball player from Tamil Nadu. She plays for the India women's national basketball team as a guard. She plays for Indian Railways team in the domestic tournaments and for Tamil Nadu in National Games.

== Early life and career ==
Sathya is from Coimbatore, Tamil Nadu. She did her graduation at MOP Vaishnav college, Chennai.

She was selected to play for the Indian team in the 3rd South Asian Basketball Association Women's Championship 2025 qualifiers at New Delhi from 23 to 26 February 2025. The Indian team played Maldives and Nepal for a berth in the FIBA women's Asia Cup. In the first match, India beat Nepal 113–32 on 23 February 2025 and on 25 February 2025, defeated Maldives 113–25. She played both the matches.

She made her international debut in the 2022 FIBA U18 Women's Asian Championship 2022 Division A. She played for Tamil Nadu which won the National Games at Dehradun on 2 February 2025. She top scored with 17 points in the final match against Kerala. She was also part of the Railways team that won the 74th Senior National Basketball Championship at Bhavnagar in January 2025.
