= Pan Zhenqi =

Chinese basketball player (born 1995)

No. 7 – Beijing Great Wall
- Position: Forward
- League: WCBA

Personal information
- Born: 5 July 1995 (age 31)
- Listed height: 1.90 m (6 ft 3 in)

Career information
- Playing career: 2013–present

Career history
- 2013–2020: Bayi Kylin
- 2021–2025: Inner Mongolia Rural Credit Union
- 2025–present: Beijing Great Wall
Medals
Women's basketball
Representing China
World Cup
Silver medal – second place	2022 Australia
Asia Cup
Gold medal – first place	2023 Australia
Silver medal – second place	2021 Jordan
Bronze medal – third place	2025 China
Asian Games
Gold medal – first place	2022 Hangzhou	Team

Pan Zhenqi (Chinese: 潘臻琦; pinyin: Pān Zhēnqí; born 5 July 1995) is a Chinese basketball player for the Beijing Great Wall of the Women's Chinese Basketball Association. She is part of the Chinese team in the women's tournament at the 2020 Summer Olympics.

Having developed most of her career at Bayi, Zhenqi currently plays for Inner Mongolia team in the WCBA, winning the WCBA championship in 2022.

She was part of the gold winning team at the Military World Games 2019, defeating Brazil in the finals by 93-65. She was also included in the silver winning 2022 FIBA Women's World Cup Chinese squad, being defeated by the USA team in the finals by 61-83.
