= Yamanashi Queenbees =

Basketball team based in Kai, Yamanashi, Japan

Yamanashi Queenbees 山梨クィーンビーズ
- League: Women's Japan Basketball League
- Founded: 1968
- History: Hitachi Kofu; Kofu Queenbees; Yamanashi Queenbees
- Arena: Shikishima Gymnasium
- Location: Kai, Yamanashi
- Main sponsor: Nihon Koku Gakuen
- Website: www.yamanashi-queenbees.com
Home	Away

The Yamanashi Queenbees (Japanese: 山梨クィーンビーズ; formerly the Kofu Queenbees, 甲府クィーンビーズ) are a professional basketball team based in Kai, Yamanashi, playing in the Women's Japan Basketball League. From 2024 season they are playing in the lower “W-League Future", after the women's league is split into two divisions.

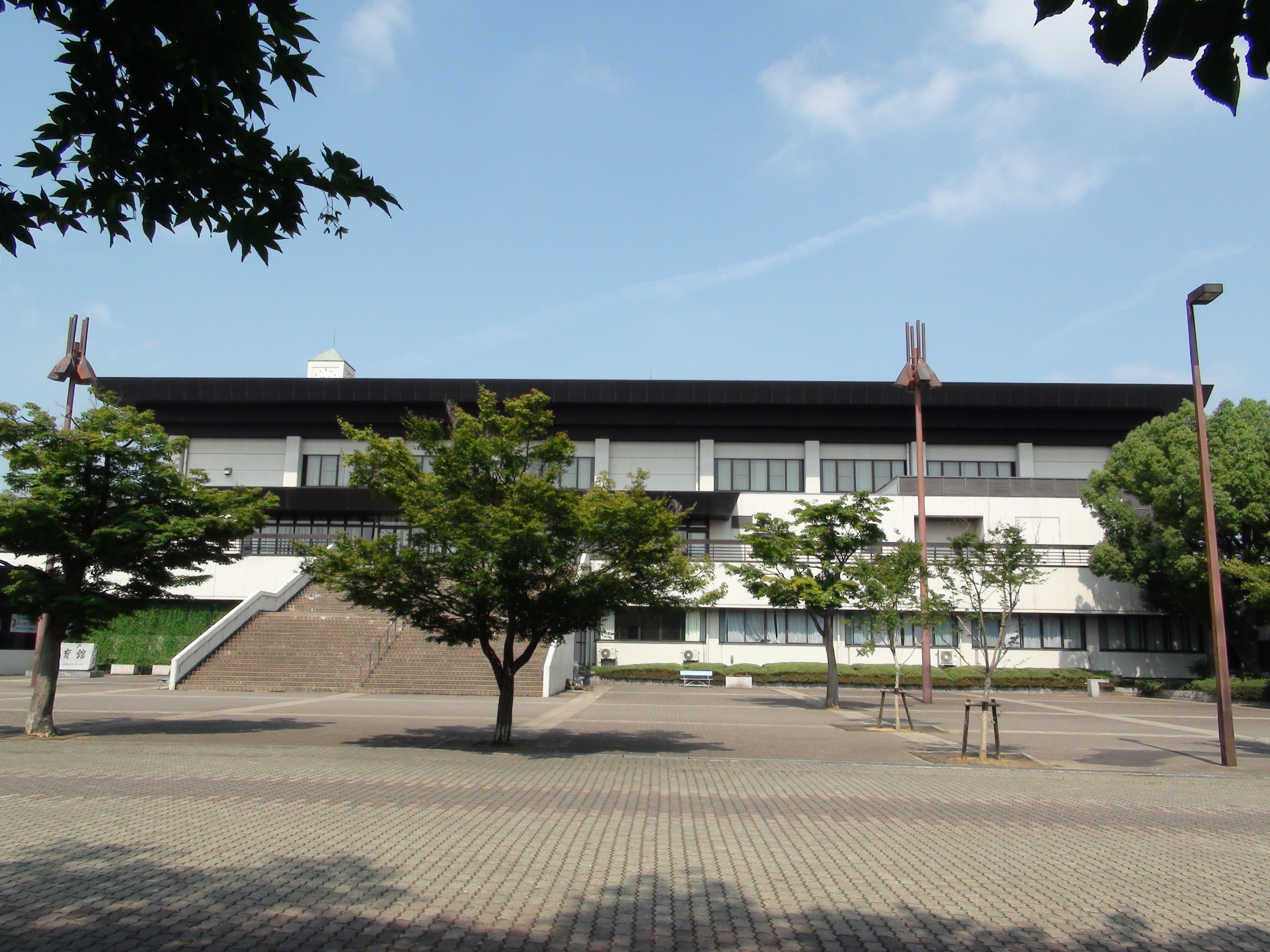
Kose Gymnasium

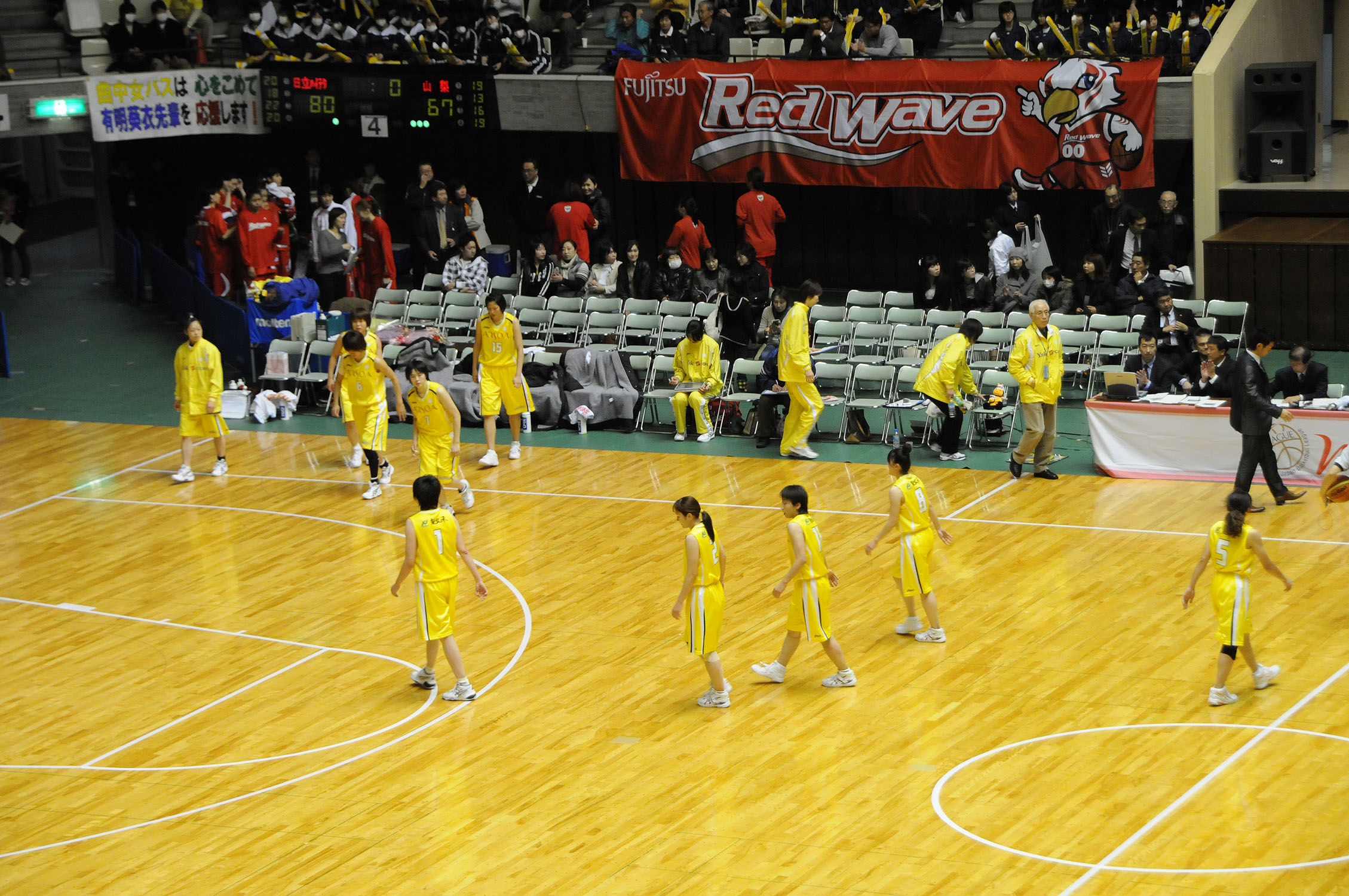

== Notable players ==
- Monami Nakajima

== Venues ==
- Kofu General Civic Center
- Fuji Hokuroku Park
