= Dharshini Thirunavukkarasu =

Indian basketball player (born 2000)

Dharshini Thirunavukkarasu (born 27 March 2000) is an Indian basketball player from Tamil Nadu. She plays for the India women's national basketball team as a guard. She plays for Indian Railways team in the domestic tournaments and for Tamil Nadu in the National Games.

== Early life and education ==
Dharshini is from Tamil Nadu. She did her graduation in commerce at Hindustan Institute of Technology and Science, Chennai.

== Career ==
She is selected in the Indian team as vice captain for the 3rd South Asian Basketball Association Women's Championship 2025 qualifiers at New Delhi from 23 to 26 February 2025. The Indian team played Maldives and Nepal for a berth in the FIBA women's Asia Cup. In the first match, India beat Nepal 113–32 on 23 February 2025. She played both the matches.

In January 2025, she played the 74th Senior National Basketball Championship at Bhavnagar, where she bagged the Most Valuable Player award. In February 2025, she captained the Tamil Nadu team that won the National Games beating Kerala in the final. She also represented India in the 2018 FIBA Under-18 Women's Asian Championship Division B.
