= Yang Shuyu =

Chinese basketball player

Melbourne Tigers
- Position: Guard
- League: NBL1 South

Personal information
- Born: 6 March 2002 (age 24) Kunming, Yunnan, China
- Listed height: 1.83 m (6 ft 0 in)
- Listed weight: 67 kg (148 lb)

Career information
- Playing career: 2018–present

Career history
- 2018–2022: Guangdong Vermilion Birds
- 2022–2023: Inner Mongolia Nongxin
- 2023–2026: Guangdong Vermilion Birds
- 2026–present: Melbourne Tigers

Career highlights
- 2× WCBA champion (2019, 2025)

Yang Shuyu (Chinese: 杨舒予; pinyin: Yáng Shūyǔ; born 6 March 2002) is a Chinese basketball player for the Melbourne Tigers of the NBL1 South. She has played in the Women's Chinese Basketball Association (WCBA) since 2018.

Yang competed in the 2020 Summer Olympics in 3x3 basketball, winning a bronze medal. With China at the 2023 FIBA Women's Asia Cup, she won a gold medal.

== Early life ==
Yang Shuyu was born on 6 March 2002 in Kunming, Yunnan, China.

In 2014, Yang became a national second-level athlete. In 2016, she became a national first-level athlete.

In 2019, Yang was admitted to Beijing Sport University.

== Career ==
=== Guangdong (2018–2022) ===
Yang debuted for the Guangdong Vermilion Birds of the Women's Chinese Basketball Association (WCBA) in the 2018–19 season. She helped Guangdong win the 2018–19 WCBA championship. In 10 regular-season games, she averaged 4.2 points and 1.6 assists in 11.5 minutes per game.

In the 2019–20 season, Yang represented Guangdong in 12 regular-season games, averaging 6.1 points, 2.1 rebounds, and 2.3 assists in 13.9 minutes per game.

In the 2020–21 season, Yang represented Guangdong in 16 regular-season games, averaging 11.1 points, 3.9 rebounds, and 1.6 assists in 23.6 minutes per game. She also played in one playoff game, recording 8 points, 8 rebounds, and 2 assists.

In the 2021–22 season, Yang represented Guangdong in 17 regular-season games, averaging 15.6 points, 5.1 rebounds, and 3.1 assists in 29.6 minutes per game. She also played in 1 playoff game, recording 7 points, 6 rebounds, and 4 assists.

=== Inner Mongolia (2022–2023) ===
For the 2022–23 WCBA season, Yang played for Inner Mongolia Nongxin. She helped Inner Mongolia finish the season as runners-up.

=== Return to Guangdong (2023–2026) ===
Yang returned to Guangdong Vermilion Birds for the 2023–24 season. She continued with Guangdong in 2024–25 and 2025–26.

=== Melbourne Tigers (2026–present) ===
On 7 April 2026, Yang signed with the Melbourne Tigers of the NBL1 South in Australia for the 2026 NBL1 season.

=== National team ===
Yang qualified to participate at the 2020 Summer Olympics in 3x3 basketball, with the team winning a bronze medal. From then on, her attractiveness and boyishness went viral among mainly Chinese internet users, and also became the focus of attention of Chinese Internet communities, which was reported by local news outlets.

On 2 July 2023, in the final of the 2023 FIBA Women's Asia Cup, Yang helped China defeat Japan 73–71 to win the gold medal.

== Personal life ==
She is the sister of the basketball player Yang Liwei.

In 2023, she was selected as Prada Brand Ambassador.
