= Sreekala Rani =

Indian basketball player (born 2001)

Sreekala Rani (born 19 January 2001) is an Indian basketball player from Kerala. She plays for the India women's national basketball team as a forward. She plays for Kerala state team in the domestic tournaments and is registered with the Kerala State Electricity Board. Earlier, she was with Railways team.

== Early life and career ==
Rani is from Thiruvananthapuram, Kerala.

She is selected to captain the Indian team in the 3rd South Asian Basketball Association Women's Championship 2025 qualifiers at New Delhi from 23 to 26 February 2025. The Indian team played Maldives and Nepal for a berth in the FIBA women's Asia Cup. In the first match, India beat Nepal 113–32 on 23 February 2025. She played both the matches, and the final against Maldives on 26 February 2025.

With 16 points, 5 rebounds and six assists, Rani played a crucial role in Kerala bagging a silver medal at the National Games 2025. Earlier, she represented India in the 2022 Asian Games and the 2021 FIBA Women's Asia Cup. She also played the 74th Senior National Basketball Championship at Bhavnagar, where she was awarded a cash prize for best three-pointer shooter. She represented India in the 2018 FIBA Under-18 Women's Asian Championship Division B and in the 2017 FIBA Under-16 Women's Asian Championship Division B.
