= Pushpa Senthil Kumar =

Indian basketball player

Personal information
- Born: September 18, 2001 (age 24)
- Listed height: 178 cm (5 ft 10 in)

Pushpa Senthil Kumar (born 18 September 2001) is an Indian basketball player from Tamil Nadu. She plays as a centre point.

== Early life ==
Pushpa hails from Nagapattinam, Tamil Nadu, India. She is employed with Indian Railways and plays for Railways in the domestic tournaments.

== Career ==
Pushpa was a member of the National Team Youth in 2017, where she played in the FIBA Under-16 Women's Asian Championship. In 2018, she was team captain, and FIBA Basketball included her tenth on their "Top 12 players to watch at #FIBAU18Asia in Bengaluru" list.

In 2021, Senthilkumar was a member of the National Team Senior and played in the FIBA Women's Asia Cup. She was named in the Indian women's team for 2022 Asian Games at Hangzhou, China. In 2023, she played in the FIBA Asia 3x3 women's events in March and July.

In 2018, she was selected as the lone girl from India to take part in the fourth annual Basketball Without Borders camp in Los Angeles organised by NBA.
