= 2025 SABA Women's Championship =

2025 SABA Championship for Women
3rd South Asian Women's Basketball Championship

Tournament details
- Host country: India
- Dates: 23 – 26 February
- Teams: 3 (from 1 confederation)
- Venue: 1 (in 1 host city)

Final positions
- Champions: India (1st title)

The 2025 SABA Women's Championship was the 3rd edition of SABA Women's Championship. The tournament was held from 23 February to 26 February in New Delhi, India. Three teams will participate in the tournament for SABA subzone, one of FIBA Asia's subzone. Bangladesh, Bhutan and Sri Lanka are not participating in the four-day competition.

== Standings ==
Pos	Team	Pld	W	L	PF	PA	PD	Pts	Final Result
1	India (H)	2	2	0	226	57	+169	4	Gold medal
2	Maldives	2	1	1	78	159	−81	3	Silver medal
3	Nepal	2	0	2	78	166	−88	2	Bronze medal

Rules for classification: (1) Tournament points, (2) Head-to-head tournament points, (3) Head-to-head goal average, (4) Overall goal average, (5) Drawing of lots
(H) Hosts

== Group stage ==
All times are in India Standard Time (UTC+05:30)

23 February
18:00

Report

India	113–32	Nepal
Scoring by quarter: 23–6, 19–4, 36–9, 35–13

KD Jadhav Indoor Stadium, New Delhi
Attendance: 100

24 February
18:00

Report

Maldives	53–46	Nepal
Scoring by quarter: 9–4, 17–11, 8–17, 19–14

KD Jadhav Indoor Stadium, New Delhi
Attendance: 100

25 February
18:00

Report

India	113–25	Maldives
Scoring by quarter: 26–8, 30–5, 24–7, 33–5

KD Jadhav Indoor Stadium, New Delhi
Attendance: 100

== Final ==
26 February
19:00

Report

India	107–32	Maldives
Scoring by quarter: 19–10, 30–7, 27–5, 31–10

KD Jadhav Indoor Stadium, New Delhi
Attendance: 250

== Final standings ==
Rank	Team
Gold medal	India
Silver medal	Maldives
Bronze medal	Nepal

== Awards ==
2025 SABA Women's champions

India
First title
