= 2027 FIBA Women's Asia Cup =

Tournament details
- Host country: Philippines
- City: Cebu City
- Dates: 11–18 July
- Teams: 8 (from 1 confederation)
- Venue: 1

Official website
- 2027 FIBA Women's Asia Cup Division A

The 2027 FIBA Women's Asia Cup will be the 32nd edition of the tournament, set to be held in Cebu City, Philippines from 11 to 18 July 2027. It will be the Philippines' first hosting of the tournament.

Australia are the defending champions.

== Format ==
The eight teams will be split into two groups of four teams. The first-placed teams from each group qualify automatically to the semifinals with the second-and third-placed teams playing a playoff round to determine the other semifinal slots. The second-placed teams face off against the third-placed teams from the other group. A knockout-system will be used after the preliminary round with the losing teams playing in a classification game.

== Venues ==
On 8 July 2026, the SM Seaside Cebu Arena was confirmed as the tournament's main venue.

Cebu City	2027 FIBA Women's Asia Cup (Philippines)
SM Seaside Cebu Arena	2027 FIBA Women's Asia Cup (Philippines)
Capacity: 16,000	2027 FIBA Women's Asia Cup (Philippines)

== Qualified teams ==
Teams who finished in the top seven of the 2025 edition retained their place in Division A. This include the hosts Philippines, which finished in sixth place. Joining them are the winners of the Division B, Chinese Taipei, who secured an immediate promotion back to Division A.

Qualification	Host	Dates	Vacancies	Qualified
Host nation	(Lebanon) Beirut	4 July 2025	1	Philippines
Top seven in 2025	(China) Shenzhen	13–20 July 2025	6	Australia; China; Japan; Lebanon; New Zealand; South Korea
Winner of Division B	(China) Shenzhen	13–20 July 2025	1	Chinese Taipei

=== Summary of qualified teams ===
Team	Qualification method	Appearance(s)				Previous best performance (Note: Bold text indicates they hosted that edition.)	WR (Note: World ranking at start of tournament.)
Team	Qualification method	Total (Note: In Division A. Results in Division B are excluded.)	First	Last	Streak	Previous best performance	WR
Australia	First in 2025	6th	2017	2025	6	Champions (2025)	TBD
Japan	Second in 2025	31st	1965	2025	27	Champions (1970, 2013, 2015, 2017, 2019, 2021)	TBD
China	Third in 2025	26th	1976	2025	26	Champions (Twelve times) (Note: China have won in 1976, 1986, 1990, 1992, 1994, 1995, 2001, 2004, 2005, 2009, 2011 and 2023.)	TBD
South Korea	Fourth in 2025	32nd	1965	2025	32	Champions (Twelve times) (Note: South Korea have won in 1965, 1968, 1974, 1978, 1980, 1982, 1984, 1988, 1997, 1999 and 2007.)	TBD
New Zealand	Fifth in 2025	6th	2017	2025	6	Fourth place (2023)	TBD
Philippines	Sixth in 2025	12th	1965	2025	6	Fourth place (1965, 1984)	TBD
Lebanon	Seventh in 2025	4th	2011	2025	3	Fifth place (2011)	TBD
Chinese Taipei	Winner of Division B	26th	1965	2023	1	Runners-up (1972)	TBD

== Squads ==
Each nation has to submit a list of 12 players.

== Preliminary round ==
All times are local (UTC+8).

=== Group A ===
Pos	Team	Pld	W	L	PF	PA	PD	Pts	Qualification
1	Australia	0	0	0	0	0	0	0	Semifinals
2	South Korea	0	0	0	0	0	0	0	Playoffs
3	New Zealand	0	0	0	0	0	0	0	Playoffs
4	Chinese Taipei	0	0	0	0	0	0	0	Seventh place game

First match(es) will be played: 11 July 2027. Source: FIBA
Rules for classification: 1) Points; 2) Head-to-head results; 3) Points difference; 4) Points scored.

11 July 2027

Boxscore

Australia	vs.	Chinese Taipei

SM Seaside Cebu Arena, Cebu City

11 July 2027

Boxscore

South Korea	vs.	New Zealand

SM Seaside Cebu Arena, Cebu City

12 July 2027

Boxscore

New Zealand	vs.	Australia

SM Seaside Cebu Arena, Cebu City

12 July 2027

Boxscore

Chinese Taipei	vs.	South Korea

SM Seaside Cebu Arena, Cebu City

13 July 2027

Boxscore

Australia	vs.	South Korea

SM Seaside Cebu Arena, Cebu City

14 July 2027

Boxscore

New Zealand	vs.	Chinese Taipei

SM Seaside Cebu Arena, Cebu City

=== Group B ===
Pos	Team	Pld	W	L	PF	PA	PD	Pts	Qualification
1	Japan	0	0	0	0	0	0	0	Semifinals
2	China	0	0	0	0	0	0	0	Playoffs
3	Philippines (H)	0	0	0	0	0	0	0	Playoffs
4	Lebanon	0	0	0	0	0	0	0	Seventh place game

First match(es) will be played: 11 July 2027. Source: FIBA
Rules for classification: 1) Points; 2) Head-to-head results; 3) Points difference; 4) Points scored.
(H) Hosts

11 July 2027

Boxscore

China	vs.	Philippines

SM Seaside Cebu Arena, Cebu City

12 July 2027

Boxscore

Japan	vs.	Lebanon

SM Seaside Cebu Arena, Cebu City

13 July 2027

Boxscore

Philippines	vs.	Japan

SM Seaside Cebu Arena, Cebu City

13 July 2027

Boxscore

Lebanon	vs.	China

SM Seaside Cebu Arena, Cebu City

14 July 2027

Boxscore

Japan	vs.	China

SM Seaside Cebu Arena, Cebu City

14 July 2027

Boxscore

Philippines	vs.	Lebanon

SM Seaside Cebu Arena, Cebu City

== Knockout round ==
=== Bracket ===
Qualification to semifinals
16 July
B2
A3
16 July
A2
B3

Semi-finals
17 July
A1
17 July
B1

Final
18 July
Third place
18 July

=== Qualification to semifinals ===
16 July 2027

A2	vs.	B3

SM Seaside Cebu Arena, Cebu City

16 July 2027

B2	vs.	A3

SM Seaside Cebu Arena, Cebu City

=== Semifinals ===
17 July 2027

A1	vs.	WQ2

SM Seaside Cebu Arena, Cebu City

17 July 2027

B1	vs.	WQ1

SM Seaside Cebu Arena, Cebu City

=== Seventh place game ===
16 July 2027

A4	vs.	B4

SM Seaside Cebu Arena, Cebu City

=== Fifth place game ===
17 July 2027

LQ1	vs.	LQ2

SM Seaside Cebu Arena, Cebu City

=== Third place game ===
18 July 2027

LSF1	vs.	LSF2

SM Seaside Cebu Arena, Cebu City

=== Final ===
18 July 2027

WSF1	vs.	WSF2

SM Seaside Cebu Arena, Cebu City

== Final standings ==
Rank	Team	Record
1st place, gold medalist(s)		
2nd place, silver medalist(s)		
3rd place, bronze medalist(s)		
4		
5		
6		
7		
8		
