= Basketball at the 2000 Summer Olympics – Women's qualification =

The women's qualification for the 2000 Olympic women's basketball tournament occurred from 1998 to 2000; all five FIBA (International Basketball Federation) zones sent in teams.

The first qualifying tournament was the 1998 FIBA World Championship for Women in which the champion was guaranteed of a place in the Olympics. Throughout the next two years, several regional tournaments served as qualification for the zonal tournaments, which doubles as intercontinental championships, to determine which teams were to participate in the 2000 Sydney Summer Olympics.

== Qualification ==
=== Outright qualification ===
Twelve teams took part in the Olympics, with each NOC sending in one team. The host nation (Australia) qualified automatically as hosts.

There are a total of 5 zonal tournaments (doubling as intercontinental championships) that determined the qualifying teams, with a total of 7 teams qualifying outright. Each zone was allocated with the following qualifying berths:

- FIBA Africa: 1 team (champion)
- FIBA Americas: 3 teams (champion, runner-up and third place)
- FIBA Asia: 1 team (champion)
- FIBA Europe: 4 teams (Top four places)
- FIBA Oceania: 1 team (runner-up)

Furthermore, United States qualified automatically by winning at the 1998 FIBA World Championship for Women.

== Summary ==
Qualified for the Olympics outright
Qualified automatically

These are the final standings of the different Olympic qualifying tournaments. The venues are as follows:

- 1998 FIBA World Championship for Women: Berlin (Germany)
- 1997 FIBA Africa Championship for Women: Nairobi (Kenya)
- 1999 FIBA Americas Championship for Women: Havana (Cuba)
- FIBA Asia Championship for Women 1999: Shizuoka (Japan)
- EuroBasket Women 1999: Warsaw (Poland)
- 1997 FIBA Oceania Championship for Women: Auckland (New Zealand)

Rank	World	Africa	Americas	Asia	Europe	Oceania	Host
1st	United States	Senegal	Cuba	South Korea	Poland	Australia	Australia
2nd	Russia	DR Congo	Brazil	Japan	France	New Zealand	
3rd	Australia	Nigeria	Canada	Chinese Taipei	Russia	bgcolor=gray	
4th	Brazil	Kenya	Mexico	China	Slovakia	bgcolor=gray	
5th	Spain	Angola	Argentina	Thailand	Czech Republic		
6th	Lithuania	Mali	Dominican Republic	North Korea	Lithuania		
7th	Cuba	Cameroon	Puerto Rico	Malaysia	Yugoslavia		
8th	Slovakia	Tanzania	Venezuela	Hong Kong	Croatia		
9th	Japan	Uganda		Sri Lanka	Latvia		
10th	Hungary				Bosnia and Herzegovina		
11th	Germany				Italy		
12th	China				Germany		
13th	South Korea						
14th	Senegal						
15th	Argentina						
16th	DR Congo						

== Qualified teams ==
- Senegal
- Australia
- Canada
- South Korea
- France
- Poland
- Slovakia
- New Zealand
- Russia
- Cuba
- United States
- Brazil
