= Basketball at the 1990 Asian Games – Women's tournament =

Women at the 1990 Asian Games
- Venue: Capital Indoor Stadium
- Date: 23 September – 6 October 1990
- Nations: 6

Medalists
gold medal	South Korea
silver medal	China
bronze medal	Chinese Taipei

The 1990 Women's Asian Games Basketball Tournament was held in China from September 23, 1990 to October 6, 1990.

== Results ==
=== Preliminary round ===
Pos	Team	Pld	W	L	PF	PA	PD	Pts	Qualification
1	China	5	5	0	478	273	+205	10	Gold medal game
2	South Korea	5	4	1	431	317	+114	9	Gold medal game
3	Chinese Taipei	5	3	2	413	424	−11	8	Bronze medal game
4	Japan	5	2	3	423	463	−40	7	Bronze medal game
5	North Korea	5	1	4	392	368	+24	6	
6	Thailand	5	0	5	254	546	−292	5	

Source: Results

23 September

Japan	114–115 (OT)	Chinese Taipei

Capital Indoor Stadium, Beijing

23 September

South Korea	126–47	Thailand

Capital Indoor Stadium, Beijing

24 September

China	115–21	Thailand

Capital Indoor Stadium, Beijing

24 September

South Korea	70–67	North Korea

Capital Indoor Stadium, Beijing

28 September

South Korea	97–72	Japan

Capital Indoor Stadium, Beijing

28 September

Thailand	59–103	North Korea

Capital Indoor Stadium, Beijing

28 September

China	98–58	Chinese Taipei

Capital Indoor Stadium, Beijing

29 September

Thailand	65–96	Japan

Capital Indoor Stadium, Beijing

29 September

China	82–72	North Korea

Capital Indoor Stadium, Beijing

30 September

Chinese Taipei	56–78	South Korea

Capital Indoor Stadium, Beijing

30 September

Japan	79–78	North Korea

Capital Indoor Stadium, Beijing

3 October

China	108–62	Japan

Capital Indoor Stadium, Beijing

3 October

Chinese Taipei	106–62	Thailand

Capital Indoor Stadium, Beijing

4 October

North Korea	72–78	Chinese Taipei

Capital Indoor Stadium, Beijing

4 October

China	75–60	South Korea

Capital Indoor Stadium, Beijing

=== Final round ===
==== Bronze medal game ====
6 October

Chinese Taipei	90–71	Japan

Capital Indoor Stadium, Beijing

==== Gold medal game ====
6 October

China	70–77	South Korea

Capital Indoor Stadium, Beijing

== Final standing ==
Rank	Team	Pld	W	L
1st place, gold medalist(s)	South Korea	6	5	1
2nd place, silver medalist(s)	China	6	5	1
3rd place, bronze medalist(s)	Chinese Taipei	6	4	2
4	Japan	6	2	4
5	North Korea	5	1	4
6	Thailand	5	0	5
