= Basketball at the 1998 Asian Games – Women's tournament =

Women at the 1998 Asian Games
- Venue: Thammasat Gymnasium 1 Suphan Buri Provincial Gymnasium
- Date: 8–18 December 1998
- Nations: 7

Medalists
gold medal	Japan
silver medal	China
bronze medal	South Korea

The 1998 women's Asian Games basketball tournament was held in Thailand from 8 to 18 December 1998.

== Results ==
=== Preliminary round ===
==== Group E ====
Pos	Team	Pld	W	L	PF	PA	PD	Pts	Qualification
1	South Korea	3	3	0	235	151	+84	6	Semifinals
2	Chinese Taipei	3	2	1	211	206	+5	5	Semifinals
3	Kazakhstan	3	1	2	204	216	−12	4	5th place game
4	Thailand	3	0	3	179	256	−77	3	

Source: Results

8 December

Chinese Taipei	79–74	Kazakhstan

9 December

Kazakhstan	79–67	Thailand

10 December

South Korea	71–49	Chinese Taipei

12 December

South Korea	70–51	Kazakhstan

12 December

Chinese Taipei	83–61	Thailand

13 December

Thailand	51–94	South Korea

==== Group F ====
Pos	Team	Pld	W	L	PF	PA	PD	Pts	Qualification
1	Japan	2	2	0	204	118	+86	4	Semifinals
2	China	2	1	1	193	125	+68	3	Semifinals
3	Philippines	2	0	2	81	235	−154	2	5th place game

Source: Results

9 December

China	116–40	Philippines

12 December

Philippines	41–119	Japan

13 December

Japan	85–77	China

=== 5th place game ===
15 December

Kazakhstan	78–40	Philippines

=== Final round ===
Semifinals
16 December
South Korea	73
China	80
16 December
Chinese Taipei	76
Japan	95

Gold medal game
18 December
China	69
Japan	93
Bronze medal game
18 December
South Korea	92
Chinese Taipei	76

==== Semifinals ====
16 December

China	80–73	South Korea

Thammasat Gymnasium 1, Bangkok

16 December

Chinese Taipei	76–95	Japan

Thammasat Gymnasium 1, Bangkok

==== Bronze medal game ====
18 December

South Korea	92–76	Chinese Taipei

Thammasat Gymnasium 1, Bangkok

==== Gold medal game ====
18 December

China	69–93	Japan
Scoring by half: 36–40, 33–53

Thammasat Gymnasium 1, Bangkok

== Final standing ==
Rank	Team	Pld	W	L
1st place, gold medalist(s)	Japan	4	4	0
2nd place, silver medalist(s)	China	4	2	2
3rd place, bronze medalist(s)	South Korea	5	4	1
4	Chinese Taipei	5	2	3
5	Kazakhstan	4	2	2
6	Philippines	3	0	3
7	Thailand	3	0	3
