= Basketball at the 1994 Asian Games – Women's tournament =

Women at the 1994 Asian Games
- Date: 3–13 October 1994
- Nations: 6

Medalists
gold medal	South Korea
silver medal	Japan
bronze medal	China

The 1994 Women's Asian Games Basketball Tournament was held in Hiroshima from 3 to 13 October 1994.

== Results ==
All times are Japan Standard Time (UTC+09:00)

=== Preliminary round ===
Pos	Team	Pld	W	L	PF	PA	PD	Pts	Qualification
1	South Korea	5	4	1	516	389	+127	9 (Note: Tied on head-to-head wins (1). Head-to-head game points average: KOR 1.166, JPN 0.971, CHN 0.886.)	Gold medal game
2	Japan	5	4	1	520	383	+137	9	Gold medal game
3	China	5	4	1	429	374	+55	9	Bronze medal game
4	Chinese Taipei	5	2	3	377	424	−47	7	Bronze medal game
5	Kazakhstan	5	1	4	392	470	−78	6	
6	Thailand	5	0	5	272	466	−194	5	

Source: Results
Notes:

3 October
14:00

Kazakhstan	76–50	Thailand

Hiroshima

3 October
16:00

Chinese Taipei	83–110	Japan
Scoring by half: 41–67, 42–43

Hiroshima

4 October
16:00

South Korea	122–90	Kazakhstan

Hiroshima

4 October
18:00

Thailand	59–73	Chinese Taipei

Hiroshima

5 October
16:00

Japan	82–91	China
Scoring by half: 31–48, 51–43

Hiroshima

5 October
18:00

South Korea	101–83	Chinese Taipei
Scoring by half: 53–48, 48–35

Hiroshima

6 October
18:00

Thailand	49–83	China

Hiroshima

7 October
15:00

Kazakhstan	74–120	Japan
Scoring by half: 39–54, 35–66

Hiroshima

7 October
18:00

China	73–103	South Korea

Hiroshima

8 October
14:00

Kazakhstan	71–79	Chinese Taipei

Hiroshima

8 October
16:00

South Korea	110–59	Thailand

Hiroshima

9 October
14:00

Japan	84–80	South Korea
Scoring by half: 47–42, 37–38

Hiroshima

9 October
14:00

Chinese Taipei	59–83	China
Scoring by half: 34–50, 25–33

Hiroshima

10 October
14:00

China	99–81	Kazakhstan
Scoring by half: 48–35, 51–46

Hiroshima

10 October
14:00

Thailand	55–124	Japan
Scoring by half: 26–63, 29–61

Hiroshima

=== Final round ===
==== Bronze medal game ====
12 October
18:00

China	83–31	Chinese Taipei
Scoring by half: 46–12, 37–19

Hiroshima

==== Gold medal game ====
13 October
18:00

South Korea	77–76	Japan
Scoring by half: 37–44, 40–32

Hiroshima

== Final standing ==
Rank	Team	Pld	W	L
1st place, gold medalist(s)	South Korea	6	5	1
2nd place, silver medalist(s)	Japan	6	4	2
3rd place, bronze medalist(s)	China	6	5	1
4	Chinese Taipei	6	2	4
5	Kazakhstan	5	1	4
6	Thailand	5	0	5
