= 2005 FIBA Asia Championship for Women =

2005 FIBA Women's Asia Cup
21st Asian Women's Basketball Championship

Tournament details
- Host country: China
- Dates: June 19–26
- Teams: 13 (from 44 federations)
- Venue: 1 (in 1 host city)

Final positions
- Champions: China (9th title)

The 2005 FIBA Asia Championship for Women is the qualifying tournament for 2006 FIBA World Championship for Women. The tournament was held on Qinhuangdao, China from June 19 to June 26. The championship is divided into two levels: Level I and Level II. The winner of the second division progresses to the first division at the next edition.

== Preliminary round ==
=== Level I ===
Team	Pld	W	L	PF	PA	PD	Pts
South Korea	4	4	0	355	230	+125	8
China	4	3	1	370	262	+108	7
Chinese Taipei	4	2	2	356	312	+44	6
Japan	4	1	3	307	369	−62	5
Thailand	4	0	4	205	420	−215	4

June 19
19:30

China	102–96 (OT)	Chinese Taipei
Scoring by quarter: 27–31, 18–23, 29–18, 16–18, Overtime: 12–6

Olympic Sports Center, Qinhuangdao

June 19
21:30

Japan	62–108	South Korea
Scoring by quarter: 18–20, 11–20, 15–30, 18–38

Olympic Sports Center, Qinhuangdao

June 20
19:30

China	107–65	Japan
Scoring by quarter: 33–12, 19–20, 28–19, 27–14

Olympic Sports Center, Qinhuangdao

June 20
21:30

South Korea	101–45	Thailand
Scoring by quarter: 23–8, 19–19, 31–12, 28–6

Olympic Sports Center, Qinhuangdao

June 21
19:30

Thailand	38–105	China
Scoring by quarter: 8–23, 16–21, 6–23, 8–38

Olympic Sports Center, Qinhuangdao

June 21
21:30

Japan	73–86	Chinese Taipei
Scoring by quarter: 16–26, 16–13, 21–24, 20–23

Olympic Sports Center, Qinhuangdao

June 22
19:30

China	56–63	South Korea
Scoring by quarter: 11–17, 13–12, 15–15, 17–19

Olympic Sports Center, Qinhuangdao

June 22
21:30

Chinese Taipei	107–54	Thailand
Scoring by quarter: 25–13, 34–7, 25–22, 23–12

Olympic Sports Center, Qinhuangdao

June 23
19:30

Thailand	68–107	Japan
Scoring by quarter: 25–23, 12–27, 18–29, 13–28

Olympic Sports Center, Qinhuangdao

June 23
21:30

Chinese Taipei	67–83	South Korea
Scoring by quarter: 6–24, 18–21, 19–22, 24–16

Olympic Sports Center, Qinhuangdao

=== Level II – Group A ===
Team	Pld	W	L	PF	PA	PD	Pts
Malaysia	3	3	0	199	152	+47	6
Hong Kong	3	2	1	166	164	+2	5
Singapore	3	1	2	174	174	0	4
Sri Lanka	3	0	3	168	217	−49	3

June 19
14:00

Singapore	81–66	Sri Lanka
Scoring by quarter: 23–25, 19–12, 21–13, 18–16

Olympic Sports Center, Qinhuangdao

June 20
14:00

Malaysia	77–44	Hong Kong
Scoring by quarter: 18–16, 21–12, 18–7, 20–9

Olympic Sports Center, Qinhuangdao

June 21
16:00

Singapore	41–55	Hong Kong
Scoring by quarter: 9–15, 9–11, 12–13, 11–16

Olympic Sports Center, Qinhuangdao

June 22
14:00

Hong Kong	67–46	Sri Lanka
Scoring by quarter: 22–9, 16–9, 15–16, 14–12

Olympic Sports Center, Qinhuangdao

June 22
16:00

Malaysia	53–52	Singapore
Scoring by quarter: 4–9, 16–13, 15–18, 18–12

Olympic Sports Center, Qinhuangdao

June 23
12:00

Sri Lanka	56–69	Malaysia
Scoring by quarter: 10–18, 6–16, 12–21, 28–14

Olympic Sports Center, Qinhuangdao

=== Level II – Group B ===
Team	Pld	W	L	PF	PA	PD	Pts
North Korea	3	3	0	249	205	+44	6
Kazakhstan	3	2	1	209	176	+33	5
India	3	1	2	219	209	+10	4
Philippines	3	0	3	154	241	−87	3

June 19
16:00

India	80–86	North Korea
Scoring by quarter: 26–11, 10–21, 27–28, 17–26

Olympic Sports Center, Qinhuangdao

June 20
16:00

Philippines	42–73	Kazakhstan
Scoring by quarter: 8–12, 5–17, 13–21, 16–23

Olympic Sports Center, Qinhuangdao

June 21
14:00

Kazakhstan	72–57	India
Scoring by quarter: 17–12, 13–16, 25–15, 17–14

Olympic Sports Center, Qinhuangdao

June 22
12:00

North Korea	86–61	Philippines
Scoring by quarter: 20–9, 23–22, 22–18, 21–12

Olympic Sports Center, Qinhuangdao

June 23
14:00

Philippines	51–82	India
Scoring by quarter: 10–21, 15–18, 11–24, 15–19

Olympic Sports Center, Qinhuangdao

June 23
16:00

Kazakhstan	64–77	North Korea
Scoring by quarter: 14–23, 17–13, 16–24, 17–17

Olympic Sports Center, Qinhuangdao

== Classification 10th–13th ==
Semifinals
June 25
Sri Lanka	50
India	82
June 25
Singapore	41
Philippines	83

10th place
June 26
India	82
Philippines	56
12th place
June 26
Sri Lanka	0
Singapore	20

=== Semifinals ===
June 25
8:30

Sri Lanka	50–82	India
Scoring by quarter: 17–24, 8–20, 18–18, 7–20

Olympic Sports Center, Qinhuangdao

June 25
10:30

Singapore	41–83	Philippines
Scoring by quarter: 6–16, 15–22, 9–22, 11–23

Olympic Sports Center, Qinhuangdao

=== 12th place ===
June 26
8:30

Sri Lanka	0–20	Singapore
Walkover

Olympic Sports Center, Qinhuangdao

=== 10th place ===
June 26
10:30

India	82–56	Philippines
Scoring by quarter: 24–10, 19–16, 13–19, 26–11

Olympic Sports Center, Qinhuangdao

== Classification 6th–9th ==
Semifinals
June 25
Hong Kong	42
North Korea	90
June 25
Malaysia	64
Kazakhstan	67

6th place
June 26
North Korea	84
Kazakhstan	79
8th place
June 26
Hong Kong	65
Malaysia	86

=== Semifinals ===
June 25
14:00

Hong Kong	42–90	North Korea
Scoring by quarter: 6–26, 9–23, 12–24, 15–17

Olympic Sports Center, Qinhuangdao

June 25
16:00

Malaysia	64–67	Kazakhstan
Scoring by quarter: 22–15, 0–21, 12–20, 30–11

Olympic Sports Center, Qinhuangdao

=== 8th place ===
June 26
13:00

Hong Kong	65–86	Malaysia
Scoring by quarter: 14–22, 17–20, 12–28, 22–16

Olympic Sports Center, Qinhuangdao

=== 6th place ===
June 26
15:00

North Korea	84–79	Kazakhstan
Scoring by quarter: 25–16, 24–13, 18–33, 17–17

Olympic Sports Center, Qinhuangdao

== Final round ==
Semifinals
June 25
South Korea	84
Japan	64
June 25
China	86
Chinese Taipei	57

Final
June 26
South Korea	67
China	73
3rd place
June 26
Japan	62
Chinese Taipei	73

=== Semifinals ===
June 25
19:30

China	86–57	Chinese Taipei
Scoring by quarter: 26–13, 20–13, 21–16, 19–15

Olympic Sports Center, Qinhuangdao

June 25
21:30

South Korea	84–64	Japan
Scoring by quarter: 19–17, 26–17, 19–15, 20–15

Olympic Sports Center, Qinhuangdao

=== 3rd place ===
June 26
17:30

Japan	62–73	Chinese Taipei
Scoring by quarter: 14–18, 16–18, 17–16, 15–21

Olympic Sports Center, Qinhuangdao

=== Final ===
June 26
19:30

South Korea	67–73	China
Scoring by quarter: 21–19, 10–13, 23–22, 13–19

Olympic Sports Center, Qinhuangdao

== Final standing ==
Qualified for the 2006 FIBA World Championship for Women

Rank	Team	Record
1st place, gold medalist(s)	China	5–1
2nd place, silver medalist(s)	South Korea	5–1
3rd place, bronze medalist(s)	Chinese Taipei	3–3
4	Japan	1–5
5	Thailand	0–4
6	North Korea	5–0
7	Kazakhstan	3–2
8	Malaysia	4–1
9	Hong Kong	2–3
10	India	3–2
11	Philippines	1–4
12	Singapore	2–3
13	Sri Lanka	0–5

== Awards ==
2005 Asian champions

China
Ninth title
