= Basketball at the 1986 Asian Games – Women's tournament =

Women at the 1986 Asian Games
- Venue: Jamsil Gymnasium
- Date: 23 September – 2 October 1986
- Nations: 4

Medalists
gold medal	China
silver medal	South Korea
bronze medal	Japan

The 1986 Women's Asian Games Basketball Tournament was held in Seoul, South Korea from September 23, 1986 to October 2, 1986.

== Results ==
Pos	Team	Pld	W	L	PF	PA	PD	Pts
1	China	3	3	0	273	170	+103	6
2	South Korea	3	2	1	256	171	+85	5
3	Japan	3	1	2	223	207	+16	4
4	Malaysia	3	0	3	112	316	−204	3

Source: Results

23 September

China	107–38	Malaysia

Jamsil Gymnasium, Seoul

26 September

South Korea	76–62	Japan

Jamsil Gymnasium, Seoul

30 September

China	88–68	Japan

Jamsil Gymnasium, Seoul

30 September

South Korea	116–31	Malaysia

Jamsil Gymnasium, Seoul

1 October

Japan	93–43	Malaysia

Jamsil Gymnasium, Seoul

2 October

China	78–64	South Korea

Jamsil Gymnasium, Seoul

== Final standing ==
Rank	Team	Pld	W	L
1st place, gold medalist(s)	China	3	3	0
2nd place, silver medalist(s)	South Korea	3	2	1
3rd place, bronze medalist(s)	Japan	3	1	2
4	Malaysia	3	0	3
