= Thailand women's national basketball team =

Thailand
- FIBA ranking: 63 ▼2 (14 September 2026)
- Joined FIBA: 1953
- FIBA zone: FIBA Asia
- National federation: BSAT (Thailand)

Asia Cup
- Appearances: 17
- Medals: Bronze: 1972

Asian Games
- Appearances: 8
- Medals: 0

The Thailand women's national basketball team represents Thailand in international women's basketball.

In August 2017, the team won the silver medal after losing to Malaysia 60-65 in the 2017 SEA Games women's basketball match at the MABA Stadium in Kuala Lumpur.

== Competitions ==
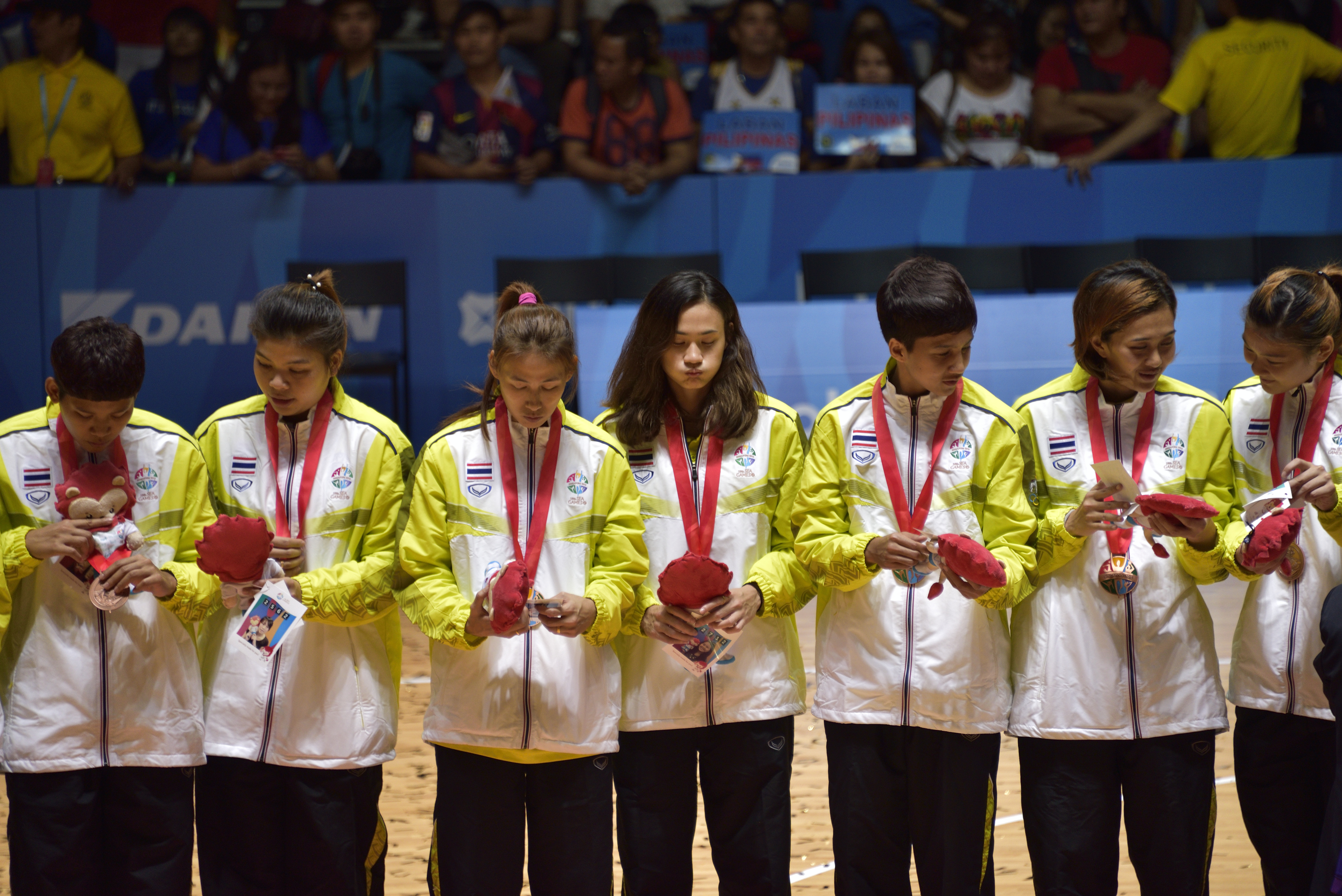
Bronze medalists at the 2015 Southeast Asian Games

=== FIBA Women's Basketball World Cup ===
Yet to qualify

=== FIBA Women's Asia Cup ===
Asian Cup Record
Year	Division A				Division B			
Year	Position	Pld	W	L	Position	Pld	W	L
(South Korea) 1965	did not qualify				No Division B / Level II			
(Taiwan) 1968	4th place	7	4	3	No Division B / Level II			
(Malaysia) 1970	6th place	9	4	5	No Division B / Level II			
(Taiwan) 1972	3rd place	6	3	3	No Division B / Level II			
(South Korea) 1974	did not qualify				No Division B / Level II			
(Hong Kong) 1976	did not qualify				No Division B / Level II			
(Malaysia) 1978	did not qualify				No Division B / Level II			
(Hong Kong) 1980	5th place	6	2	4	No Division B / Level II			
(Japan) 1982	did not qualify				No Division B / Level II			
(China) 1984	did not qualify				No Division B / Level II			
(Malaysia) 1986	5th place	7	3	4	No Division B / Level II			
(Hong Kong) 1988	7th place	8	2	6	No Division B / Level II			
(Singapore) 1990	did not qualify				did not qualify			
(South Korea) 1992	did not qualify				No Division B / Level II			
(Japan) 1994	8th place	Level II			3rd place	5	2	3
(Japan) 1995	7th place	Level II			1st place	5	5	0
(Thailand) 1997	5th place	5	1	4	Level I			
(Japan) 1999	5th place	4	0	4	Level I			
(Thailand) 2001	5th place	4	0	4	Level I			
(Japan) 2004	5th place	4	0	4	Level I			
(China) 2005	5th place	4	0	4	Level I			
(South Korea) 2007	5th place	6	2	4	Level I			
(India) 2009	5th place	6	1	5	Level I			
(Japan) 2011	suspended							
(Thailand) 2013	7th place	Level II			1st place	6	5	1
(China) 2015	5th place	6	1	5	Level I			
(India) 2017	did not qualify							
(India) 2019	did not qualify							
(Jordan) 2021	did not qualify							
(Australia) 2023	11th place	Level II			3rd place	6	4	2
(China) 2025	11th place	Level II			3rd place	6	3	3
Total		82	23	59		28	19	9

=== SEABA Championship for Women ===
Southeast Asian Championship Record
Year	Position	Pld	W	L
(Thailand) 1995	1st place			
(Thailand) 1997	1st place			
(Malaysia) 1999	2nd place			
(Thailand) 2002	1st place			
(Singapore) 2004	2nd place			
(Thailand) 2007	1st place	6	5	1
(Philippines) 2010	2nd place	5	3	2
(Indonesia) 2014	did not participate			
(Malaysia) 2016	5th place	6	2	4
Total	4 gold, 3 silver	10–7 (incomplete)		

=== Olympic Games ===
Yet to qualify

=== Asian Games ===
Asian Games Record
Year	Position	Pld	W	L
(Iran) 1974	did not qualify			
(Thailand) 1978	4th place	4	1	3
(India) 1982	did not qualify			
(South Korea) 1986	did not qualify			
(China) 1990	6th place	5	0	5
(Japan) 1994	6th place	5	0	5
(Thailand) 1998	7th place	3	0	3
(South Korea) 2002	did not qualify			
(Qatar) 2006	5th place	3	1	2
(China) 2010	7th place	3	1	2
(South Korea) 2014	6th place	5	0	5
(Indonesia) 2018	6th place	7	3	4
(China) 2022	11th place	3	0	3
(Japan) 2026	To be determined			
Total		38	6	32

=== Southeast Asian Games ===
Southeast Asian Games Record
Year	Position	Pld	W	L
(Malaysia) 1977	2nd place	4	2	1
(Indonesia) 1979	2nd place	-	-	-
(Philippines) 1981	3rd place	5	3	2
(Singapore) 1983	4th place	4	1	3
(Thailand) 1985	4th	-	-	-
(Indonesia) 1987	2nd place	-	-	-
(Malaysia) 1989	1st place	4	4	0
(Philippines) 1991	1st place	6	6	0
(Singapore) 1993	2nd place	-	-	-
(Thailand) 1995	1st place	6	6	0
(Indonesia) 1997	2nd place	5	3	2
(Brunei) 1999	Not Held			
(Malaysia) 2001	2nd place	4	3	1
(Vietnam) 2003	4th place	5	3	2
(Philippines) 2005	Not Held			
(Thailand) 2007	2nd place	3	2	1
(Laos) 2009	Not held			
(Indonesia) 2011	1st place	4	3	1
(Myanmar) 2013	1st place	4	4	0
(Singapore) 2015	3rd place	5	3	2
(Malaysia) 2017	2nd place	6	4	2
(Philippines) 2019	2nd place	3	2	1
(Vietnam) 2021	4th place	5	2	3
(Cambodia) 2023	5th place	6	2	4
(Thailand) 2025	2nd place	4	3	1
Total	5 gold, 10 silver, 2 bronze	51–21 (incomplete)		

=== Other Tournaments ===
Other Tournaments
Year	Position	Pld	W	L
(Taiwan) 2016 William Jones Cup	6th place	5	0	5
(Taiwan) 2026 William Jones Cup	6th place	3	0	3

=== Champions Cup ===
Year	Position	Pld	W	L
(Thailand) 2025 Bangkok	5th	3	1	2
(Thailand) 2026 Bangkok	7th	3	0	3
Total	2/2	6	1	5

== Roster ==
At the 2019 SEA Games:

Thailand National Basketball Team roster
Players
Coaches

Pos.	No.	Name	Age – Date of birth	Height	Club	Ctr.
G	3	Tiffany Bias	27 – 2 May 1992	1.72 m (5 ft 8 in)	New York Liberty	(United States)
C	6	Penphan Yothanan	36 – 29 December 1982	1.70 m (5 ft 7 in)	Chulalongkorn University	(Thailand)
G	7	Pimchosita Supyen	22 – 4 July 1997	1.63 m (5 ft 4 in)	Shoot It Dragon	(Thailand)
F	8	Supavadee Kunchuan	27 – 4 December 1992	1.78 m (5 ft 10 in)	Shoot It Dragon	(Thailand)
G	9	Suree Phromrat	28 – 17 July 1991	1.58 m (5 ft 2 in)	Chulalongkorn University	(Thailand)
G/F	11	Wantanee Sangmanee	26 – 11 September 1993	1.76 m (5 ft 9 in)	Sripatum University	(Thailand)
F	13	Atchara Kaichaiyapoom	27 – 11 February 1992	1.78 m (5 ft 10 in)	Bangkok Bank	(Thailand)
F	28	Supira Klunbut	25 – 8 July 1994	1.77 m (5 ft 10 in)	Shoot It Dragon	(Thailand)
F/C	29	Rattiyakorn Udomsuk	20 – 20 June 1999	1.74 m (5 ft 9 in)	Dhurakij Pundit University	(Thailand)
C	38	Kloyjai Phetsaenkha	24 – 27 March 1995	1.80 m (5 ft 11 in)	Dhurakij Pundit University	(Thailand)
G	86	Nutchavarin Buapa	26 – 5 January 1993	1.69 m (5 ft 7 in)	Chulalongkorn University	(Thailand)
F	91	Thidaporn Maihom	26 – 9 April 1993	1.70 m (5 ft 7 in)

Head coach

- (Thailand) Apaipong Netsiriswan

Assistant coach(es)

- (Thailand) Kanchana Prasanchaimontree
- (Thailand) Narumol Montee

Legend

- (C) Team captain
- Club field describes current pro club
- Age – describes age
  on 10 December 2019

== 3x3 team ==
At the 2021 FIBA 3x3 Women's Olympic Qualifying Tournament in Austria, Thailand replaced Turkmenistan into the main draw. They entered with some experience on the big stage having competed in the Women's Series two years ago and winning silver at the South East Asian Games 2019. They also reached the quarters of the Asia Cup 2019.

== See also ==
- Thailand men's national basketball team
- Thailand women's national under-19 basketball team
- Thailand women's national under-17 basketball team
