= 1999 ABC Championship for Women =

1999 FIBA Women's Asia Cup
18th Asian Women's Basketball Championship

Tournament details
- Host country: Japan
- Dates: May 2–9
- Teams: 9 (from 44 federations)
- Venue: 1 (in 1 host city)

Final positions
- Champions: South Korea (11th title)

The 1999 Asian Basketball Confederation Championship for Women, was the 18th regional championship held by Asian Basketball Confederation. The competition was hosted by Shizuoka, Japan and took place between May 2 to May 9, 1999. The championship is divided into two levels: Level I and Level II. The last finisher of Level I is relegated to Level II and the top finisher of Level II qualify for Level I 2001's championship.

== Participating teams ==
| Level I | Level II |
|---|---|
| South Korea; Japan; China; Chinese Taipei; Thailand; ~~Kazakhstan~~ * | Malaysia; Hong Kong; North Korea; Sri Lanka; ~~Uzbekistan~~ * |

* Withdrew

== Preliminary round ==
=== Level I ===
| Team | Pld | W | L | PF | PA | PD | Pts | Tiebreaker |
|---|---|---|---|---|---|---|---|---|
| Japan | 4 | 3 | 1 | 327 | 240 | +87 | 7 | 1–1 / 1.069 |
| South Korea | 4 | 3 | 1 | 311 | 249 | +62 | 7 | 1–1 / 1.027 |
| China | 4 | 3 | 1 | 290 | 249 | +41 | 7 | 1–1 / 0.907 |
| Chinese Taipei | 4 | 1 | 3 | 284 | 249 | +35 | 5 | |
| Thailand | 4 | 0 | 4 | 165 | 390 | −225 | 4 | |

May 2
13:40

| Japan | 68–63 | Chinese Taipei |
Scoring by half: 30–41, 38–22

Kusanagi Sports Park Stadium, Shizuoka

May 2
17:20

| China | 90–42 | Thailand |
Scoring by half: 36–20, 54–22

Kusanagi Sports Park Stadium, Shizuoka

May 3
13:40

| Thailand | 39–92 | South Korea |
Scoring by half: 17–37, 22–55

Kusanagi Sports Park Stadium, Shizuoka

May 3
15:30

| Chinese Taipei | 57–64 | China |
Scoring by half: 30–34, 27–30

Kusanagi Sports Park Stadium, Shizuoka

May 4
15:30

| South Korea | 66–61 | Chinese Taipei |
Scoring by half: 33–33, 33–28

Kusanagi Sports Park Stadium, Shizuoka

May 4
17:20

| Japan | 69–72 | China |
Scoring by half: 28–38, 41–34

Kusanagi Sports Park Stadium, Shizuoka

May 5
13:40

| China | 64–81 | South Korea |
Scoring by half: 27–44, 37–37

Kusanagi Sports Park Stadium, Shizuoka

May 5
15:30

| Thailand | 33–105 | Japan |
Scoring by half: 16–46, 17–49

Kusanagi Sports Park Stadium, Shizuoka

May 6
15:30

| Japan | 85–72 | South Korea |
Scoring by half: 41–42, 44–30

Kusanagi Sports Park Stadium, Shizuoka

May 6
17:20

| Chinese Taipei | 103–51 | Thailand |
Scoring by half: 50–16, 53–35

Kusanagi Sports Park Stadium, Shizuoka

=== Level II ===
| Team | Pld | W | L | PF | PA | PD | Pts |
|---|---|---|---|---|---|---|---|
| North Korea | 3 | 3 | 0 | 302 | 142 | +160 | 6 |
| Malaysia | 3 | 2 | 1 | 219 | 178 | +41 | 5 |
| Hong Kong | 3 | 1 | 2 | 175 | 201 | −26 | 4 |
| Sri Lanka | 3 | 0 | 3 | 95 | 270 | −175 | 3 |

May 2
10:00

| Hong Kong | 40–100 | North Korea |
Scoring by half: 23–45, 17–55

Kusanagi Sports Park Stadium, Shizuoka

May 4
11:50

| Malaysia | 71–91 | North Korea |
Scoring by half: 34–41, 37–50

Kusanagi Sports Park Stadium, Shizuoka

May 5
17:20

| Hong Kong | 76–36 | Sri Lanka |
Scoring by half: 38–14, 38–22

Kusanagi Sports Park Stadium, Shizuoka

May 6
13:40

| Hong Kong | 59–65 | Malaysia |
Scoring by half: 38–38, 21–27

Kusanagi Sports Park Stadium, Shizuoka

May 8
9:20

| Sri Lanka | 31–111 | North Korea |
Scoring by half: 17–71, 14–40

Kusanagi Sports Park Stadium, Shizuoka

May 9
9:00

| Sri Lanka | 28–83 | Malaysia |
Scoring by half: 19–42, 9–41

Kusanagi Sports Park Stadium, Shizuoka

== Final round ==
Semifinals
May 8
Japan | 83
Chinese Taipei | 74
May 8
South Korea | 70
China | 69

Final
May 9
Japan | 65
South Korea | 68
3rd place
May 9
Chinese Taipei | 68
China | 57

=== Semifinals ===
May 8
13:30

| Japan | 83–74 | Chinese Taipei |
Scoring by half: 43–41, 40–33

Kusanagi Sports Park Stadium, Shizuoka

May 8
15:20

| South Korea | 70–69 | China |
Scoring by half: 34–42, 36–27

Kusanagi Sports Park Stadium, Shizuoka

=== 3rd place ===
May 9
10:50

| Chinese Taipei | 68–57 | China |
Scoring by half: 38–26, 30–31

Kusanagi Sports Park Stadium, Shizuoka

=== Final ===
May 9
13:00

| Japan | 65–68 | South Korea |
Scoring by half: 30–37, 35–31

Kusanagi Sports Park Stadium, Shizuoka

== Final standing ==
| Qualified for the 2000 Summer Olympics |

| Rank | Team | Record |
|---|---|---|
| 1st place, gold medalist(s) | South Korea | 5–1 |
| 2nd place, silver medalist(s) | Japan | 4–2 |
| 3rd place, bronze medalist(s) | Chinese Taipei | 2–4 |
| 4 | China | 3–3 |
| 5 | Thailand | 0–4 |
| 6 | North Korea | 3–0 |
| 7 | Malaysia | 2–1 |
| 8 | Hong Kong | 1–2 |
| 9 | Sri Lanka | 0–3 |

== Awards ==
1999 Asian champions

South Korea
Eleventh title
