= 1995 ABC Championship for Women =

1995 FIBA Women's Asia Cup
16th Asian Women's Basketball Championship

Tournament details
- Host country: Japan
- Dates: July 23–30
- Teams: 12 (from 44 federations)
- Venue: 1 (in 1 host city)

Final positions
- Champions: China (6th title)

The 1995 Asian Basketball Confederation Championship for Women, was the 16th regional championship held by Asian Basketball Confederation. The competition was hosted by Shizuoka, Japan and took place between July 23 to July 30, 1995. The championship is divided into two levels: Level I and Level II. The last finisher of Level I is relegated to Level II and the top finisher of Level II qualify for Level I 1997's championship.

== Preliminary round ==
=== Level I ===
Team	Pld	W	L	PF	PA	PD	Pts	Tiebreaker
China	5	4	1	525	314	+211	9	1–1 / 1.034
South Korea	5	4	1	494	353	+141	9	1–1 / 1.006
Japan	5	4	1	474	313	+161	9	1–1 / 0.962
Chinese Taipei	5	2	3	439	405	+34	7	
Kyrgyzstan	5	1	4	296	533	−237	6	
Kazakhstan	5	0	5	262	572	−310	5	

July 23

Japan	98–75	Chinese Taipei
Scoring by half: 45–36, 53–39

Shizuoka

July 23

China	156–42	Kazakhstan
Scoring by half: 89–13, 67–29

Shizuoka

July 23

South Korea	122–63	Kyrgyzstan
Scoring by half: 63–35, 59–28

Shizuoka

July 24

Chinese Taipei	109–64	Kyrgyzstan
Scoring by half: 57–22, 52–42

Shizuoka

July 24

Kazakhstan	39–107	Japan
Scoring by half: 17–55, 22–52

Shizuoka

July 24

China	73–78	South Korea
Scoring by half: 47–42, 26–36

Shizuoka

July 25

Kyrgyzstan	76–68	Kazakhstan
Scoring by half: 46–35, 30–33

Shizuoka

July 25

South Korea	87–79	Chinese Taipei
Scoring by half: 50–49, 37–30

Shizuoka

July 25

Japan	70–80	China
Scoring by half: 42–41, 28–39

Shizuoka

July 27

China	117–52	Kyrgyzstan
Scoring by half: 62–18, 55–34

Shizuoka

July 27

South Korea	78–82	Japan
Scoring by half: 43–33, 35–49

Shizuoka

July 27

Chinese Taipei	104–57	Kazakhstan
Scoring by half: 53–30, 51–27

Shizuoka

July 28

Kazakhstan	56–129	South Korea
Scoring by half: 23–57, 33–72

Shizuoka

July 28

Japan	117–41	Kyrgyzstan
Scoring by half: 68–18, 49–23

Shizuoka

July 28

China	99–72	Chinese Taipei
Scoring by half: 57–35, 42–37

Shizuoka

=== Level II ===
Team	Pld	W	L	PF	PA	PD	Pts	Tiebreaker
Thailand	5	5	0	356	215	+141	10	
Hong Kong	5	3	2	296	296	0	8	1–1 / 1.106
Philippines	5	3	2	346	308	+38	8	1–1 / 1.051
Malaysia	5	3	2	293	289	+4	8	1–1 / 0.857
Jordan	5	1	4	224	352	−128	6	
Indonesia	5	0	5	244	299	−55	5	

July 23

Thailand	69–47	Malaysia
Scoring by half: 32–23, 37–24

Shizuoka

July 23

Indonesia	54–61	Hong Kong
Scoring by half: 29–19, 25–42

Shizuoka

July 23

Jordan	41–79	Philippines
Scoring by half: 17–36, 24–43

Shizuoka

Hong Kong	64–73	Philippines
Scoring by half: 28–45, 36–28

Shizuoka

Thailand	63–26	Indonesia
Scoring by half: 34–14, 29–12

Shizuoka

Malaysia	82–38	Jordan
Scoring by half: 43–15, 39–23

Shizuoka

Indonesia	49–50	Malaysia
Scoring by half: 27–29, 22–21

Shizuoka

Jordan	45–65	Hong Kong
Scoring by half: 16–38, 29–27

Shizuoka

Philippines	55–69	Thailand
Scoring by half: 18–32, 37–37

Shizuoka

Malaysia	40–61	Hong Kong
Scoring by half: 19–30, 21–31

Shizuoka

Thailand	71–42	Jordan
Scoring by half: 38–18, 33–24

Shizuoka

Philippines	67–60	Indonesia
Scoring by half: 35–34, 32–26

Shizuoka

Jordan	58–55	Indonesia
Scoring by half: 20–28, 38–27

Shizuoka

Malaysia	74–72	Philippines
Scoring by half: 36–34, 38–38

Shizuoka

Hong Kong	45–84	Thailand
Scoring by half: 22–43, 23–41

Shizuoka

== Final round ==
=== 3rd place ===
July 30

Japan	68–65	Chinese Taipei
Scoring by half: 38–41, 30–24

Shizuoka

=== Final ===
July 30

China	94–69	South Korea
Scoring by half: 46–31, 48–38

Shizuoka

== Final standing ==
Qualified for the 1996 Summer Olympics

Rank	Team	Record
1st place, gold medalist(s)	China	5–1
2nd place, silver medalist(s)	South Korea	4–2
3rd place, bronze medalist(s)	Japan	5–1
4	Chinese Taipei	2–4
5	Kyrgyzstan	1–4
6	Kazakhstan	0–5
7	Thailand	5–0
8	Hong Kong	3–2
9	Philippines	3–2
10	Malaysia	3–2
11	Jordan	1–4
12	Indonesia	0–5

== Awards ==
1995 Asian champions

China
Sixth title
