= Sri Lanka women's national basketball team =

Sri Lanka
- FIBA ranking: 115 ▲1 (18 March 2026)
- Joined FIBA: 1959
- FIBA zone: FIBA Asia
- National federation: Sri Lanka Basketball Federation (SLBF)
- Coach: Tuan Amath

Olympic Games
- Appearances: None

World Cup
- Appearances: None

Asia Cup
- Appearances: 15
- Medals: None
Home	Away

The Sri Lankan women's national basketball team is the basketball team representing Sri Lanka in international competitions.

It is administered by the Sri Lanka Basketball Federation (SLBF).

== Current roster ==
Roster for the 2017 FIBA Women's Asia Cup.

Sri Lanka women's national basketball team roster
Players
Coaches

Pos.	No.	Name	Age – Date of birth	Height	Club	Ctr.
PG	4	Premila Beruwalage	36 – 22 March 1981	1.61 m (5 ft 3 in)
PF	6	Josephine Niroshini Paiva	27 – 26 November 1989	1.80 m (5 ft 11 in)
F	7	Anjalee Ekanayake	28 – 14 February 1989	1.64 m (5 ft 5 in)
PG	8	Imesha Thathsarani Dapana Durage	21 – 17 March 1996	1.72 m (5 ft 8 in)
C	9	Sanduni Bollegala Arachchilage	33 – 4 December 1983	1.73 m (5 ft 8 in)
F	10	Jayani Nugi Ransari Thewahettige	24 – 14 April 1993	1.64 m (5 ft 5 in)
PG	11	Sulochana Sewwandi Iddamalgoda	28 – 22 March 1989	1.52 m (5 ft 0 in)
F	12	Benika Don Thalagala	29 – 7 August 1987	1.74 m (5 ft 9 in)
PG	13	Jayaliya Thewahettige	34 – 1 February 1983	1.61 m (5 ft 3 in)
C	14	Kumarine Silva	36 – 15 May 1981	1.78 m (5 ft 10 in)
PF	15	Thusyanthini Jeevathasan Karthigesu	25 – 8 January 1992	1.75 m (5 ft 9 in)
C	19	Erandi Gallage	31 – 14 May 1986	1.73 m (5 ft 8 in)

Head coach

- (Sri Lanka) Tuan Murad Amath

Assistant coach(es)

- (Sri Lanka) Susil Shantha Udukumburage

Legend

- Club – describes last
  club before the tournament
- Age – describes age
  on 23 July 2017

== Tournament record ==
=== Asia Cup ===
- 1978: 9th
- 1980: 10th
- 1984: 10th
- 1990: 10th
- 1992: 7th
- 1997: 12th
- 1999: 9th
- 2001: 11th
- 2005: 13th
- 2007: 12th
- 2009: 12th
- 2011: 12th
- 2015: 12th
- 2017: 15th
- 2023: 16th

=== SABA Championship ===
- 2016: (gold)
- 2022: (gold)

=== South Asian Games ===
- 2019: 5th

== See also ==
- Sri Lanka women's national under-19 basketball team
- Sri Lanka women's national under-17 basketball team
- Sri Lanka women's national 3x3 team
