= 1990 ABC Championship for Women =

1990 FIBA Women's Asia Cup
13th Asian Women's Basketball Championship

Tournament details
- Host country: Singapore
- Dates: March 12–17
- Teams: 11 (from all Asian federations)
- Venue: 1 (in 1 host city)

Final positions
- Champions: China (3rd title)

The 1990 Asian Basketball Confederation Championship for Women were held in Singapore. The championship is divided into two levels: Level I and Level II.

== Level I ==
Team	Pld	W	L	PF	PA	PD	Pts
China	4	4	0	399	230	+169	8
South Korea	4	3	1	370	233	+137	7
Japan	4	2	2	321	316	+5	6
Chinese Taipei	4	1	3	322	317	+5	5
Malaysia	4	0	4	158	474	−316	4

March 12
20:00

China	115–31	Malaysia

Indoor Stadium, Singapore

March 12
21:30

Japan	63–89	South Korea

Indoor Stadium, Singapore

March 13
19:30

Malaysia	41–105	Japan
Scoring by half: 23–58, 18–47

Indoor Stadium, Singapore

March 13
21:00

South Korea	83–54	Chinese Taipei
Scoring by half: 58–23, 25–31

Indoor Stadium, Singapore

March 14
19:30

Chinese Taipei	132–48	Malaysia

Indoor Stadium, Singapore

March 14
21:00

Japan	69–104	China

Indoor Stadium, Singapore

March 16
19:30

Malaysia	38–122	South Korea

Indoor Stadium, Singapore

March 16
21:00

China	102–54	Chinese Taipei

Indoor Stadium, Singapore

March 17
19:30

Chinese Taipei	82–84	Japan

Indoor Stadium, Singapore

March 17
21:00

South Korea	76–78	China
Scoring by half: 39–47, 37–31

Indoor Stadium, Singapore

== Level II ==
Team	Pld	W	L	PF	PA	PD	Pts
North Korea	5	5	0	590	183	+407	10
India	5	4	1	262	296	−34	9
Hong Kong	5	3	2	276	323	−47	8
Indonesia	5	2	3	281	318	−37	7
Sri Lanka	5	1	4	206	331	−125	6
Singapore	5	0	5	231	395	−164	5

March 12
13:30

Sri Lanka	47–46	Singapore

Indoor Stadium, Singapore

March 12
15:00

Indonesia	55–56	Hong Kong

Indoor Stadium, Singapore

March 12
16:30

North Korea	119–47	India

Indoor Stadium, Singapore

March 13
13:30

Hong Kong	65–41	Sri Lanka
Scoring by half: 29–15, 36–26

Indoor Stadium, Singapore

March 13
15:00

Singapore	30–135	North Korea
Scoring by half: 10–76, 20–59

Indoor Stadium, Singapore

March 13
16:30

India	44–41	Indonesia
Scoring by half: 29–20, 15–21

Indoor Stadium, Singapore

March 14
13:30

North Korea	112–33	Hong Kong

Indoor Stadium, Singapore

March 14
15:00

Sri Lanka	56–58	Indonesia

Indoor Stadium, Singapore

March 14
16:30

Singapore	47–64	India
Scoring by half: 22–33, 25–31

Indoor Stadium, Singapore

March 16
13:30

Hong Kong	49–51	India

Indoor Stadium, Singapore

March 16
15:00

North Korea	106–22	Sri Lanka

Indoor Stadium, Singapore

March 16
16:30

Indonesia	76–44	Singapore

Indoor Stadium, Singapore

March 17
13:30

India	56–40	Sri Lanka

Indoor Stadium, Singapore

March 17
15:00

Indonesia	51–118	North Korea

Indoor Stadium, Singapore

March 17
16:30

Hong Kong	73–64	Singapore

Indoor Stadium, Singapore

== Final standing ==
Qualified for the 1990 FIBA World Championship for Women

Rank	Team	Record
1st place, gold medalist(s)	China	4–0
2nd place, silver medalist(s)	South Korea	3–1
3rd place, bronze medalist(s)	Japan	2–2
4	Chinese Taipei	1–3
5	Malaysia	0–4
6	North Korea	5–0
7	India	4–1
8	Hong Kong	3–2
9	Indonesia	2–3
10	Sri Lanka	1–4
11	Singapore	0–5

== Awards ==
1990 Asian champions

China
Third title
