= 1980 ABC Championship for Women =

1980 FIBA Women's Asia Cup
8th Asian Women's Basketball Championship

Tournament details
- Host country: Hong Kong
- Dates: September 13–21
- Teams: 10 (from all Asian federations)
- Venue: 1 (in 1 host city)

Final positions
- Champions: South Korea (6th title)

The 1980 Asian Basketball Confederation Championship for Women was held in Hong Kong. It was the eighth women's ABC championship. The winner was South Korea, claiming their sixth title out of eight.

== Preliminary round ==
=== Group A ===
Team	Pld	W	L	PF	PA	PD	Pts
South Korea	2	2	0	269	68	+201	4
Malaysia	2	1	1	130	165	−35	3
Indonesia	2	0	2	90	256	−166	2

September 13

South Korea	160–34	Indonesia
Scoring by half: 86–14, 74–20

Queen Elizabeth Stadium, Hong Kong

September 14

Malaysia	34–109	South Korea
Scoring by half: 14–55, 20–54

Queen Elizabeth Stadium, Hong Kong

September 15

Indonesia	56–96	Malaysia
Scoring by half: 24–52, 32–44

Queen Elizabeth Stadium, Hong Kong

=== Group B ===
Team	Pld	W	L	PF	PA	PD	Pts
China	3	3	0	408	130	+278	6
Hong Kong	3	2	1	236	230	+6	5
India	3	1	2	189	247	−58	4
Sri Lanka	3	0	3	113	339	−226	3

September 13

China	136–54	Hong Kong
Scoring by half: 62–20, 74–34

Queen Elizabeth Stadium, Hong Kong

September 13

Sri Lanka	41–91	India
Scoring by half: 21–43, 20–48

Queen Elizabeth Stadium, Hong Kong

September 14

India	46–125	China
Scoring by half: 21–60, 25–65

Queen Elizabeth Stadium, Hong Kong

September 14

Hong Kong	101–42	Sri Lanka
Scoring by half: 50–24, 51–18

Queen Elizabeth Stadium, Hong Kong

September 15

Hong Kong	81–52	India
Scoring by half: 39–24, 42–28

Queen Elizabeth Stadium, Hong Kong

September 15

China	147–30	Sri Lanka
Scoring by half: 72–24, 75–6

Queen Elizabeth Stadium, Hong Kong

=== Group C ===
Team	Pld	W	L	PF	PA	PD	Pts
Japan	2	2	0	197	78	+119	4
Thailand	2	1	1	125	160	−35	3
Singapore	2	0	2	101	185	−84	2

September 13

Japan	97–40	Thailand
Scoring by half: 55–16, 42–24

Queen Elizabeth Stadium, Hong Kong

September 14

Thailand	85–63	Singapore
Scoring by half: 45–24, 40–39

Queen Elizabeth Stadium, Hong Kong

September 15

Singapore	38–100	Japan
Scoring by half: 26–48, 12–52

Queen Elizabeth Stadium, Hong Kong

== Final round ==
- The results and the points of the matches between the same teams that were already played during the preliminary round shall be taken into account for the final round.

=== Classification 7th–10th ===
Team	Pld	W	L	PF	PA	PD	Pts	Tiebreaker
India	3	2	1	225	154	+71	5	1–1 / 1.186
Singapore	3	2	1	221	167	+54	5	1–1 / 1.032
Indonesia	3	2	1	219	188	+31	5	1–1 / 0.825
Sri Lanka	3	0	3	127	283	−156	3	

September 17

Indonesia	101–45	Sri Lanka
Scoring by half: 51–29, 50–16

Queen Elizabeth Stadium, Hong Kong

September 18

Sri Lanka	41–91	Singapore
Scoring by half: 27–41, 14–50

Queen Elizabeth Stadium, Hong Kong

September 18

India	78–48	Indonesia
Scoring by half: 39–19, 39–29

Queen Elizabeth Stadium, Hong Kong

September 19

Singapore	65–56	India
Scoring by half: 37–30, 28–26

Queen Elizabeth Stadium, Hong Kong

September 21

Indonesia	70–65 (OT)	Singapore
Scoring by half: 33–35, 26–24 Overtime: 11–6

Queen Elizabeth Stadium, Hong Kong

=== Championship ===
Team	Pld	W	L	PF	PA	PD	Pts
South Korea	5	5	0	616	257	+359	10
China	5	4	1	563	290	+273	9
Japan	5	3	2	393	352	+41	8
Malaysia	5	2	3	292	443	−151	7
Thailand	5	1	4	256	586	−330	6
Hong Kong	5	0	5	291	483	−192	5

September 17

Hong Kong	56–61	Malaysia
Scoring by half: 30–26, 26–35

Queen Elizabeth Stadium, Hong Kong

September 17

China	145–32	Thailand
Scoring by half: 67–14, 78–18

Queen Elizabeth Stadium, Hong Kong

September 17

South Korea	109–54	Japan
Scoring by half: 54–18, 55–36

Queen Elizabeth Stadium, Hong Kong

September 18

Malaysia	38–123	China
Scoring by half: 16–73, 22–50

Queen Elizabeth Stadium, Hong Kong

September 18

Thailand	50–167	South Korea
Scoring by half: 32–76, 18–91

Queen Elizabeth Stadium, Hong Kong

September 18

Japan	79–55	Hong Kong
Scoring by half: 35–25, 44–30

Queen Elizabeth Stadium, Hong Kong

September 19

Thailand	57–102	Malaysia
Scoring by half: 31–37, 26–65

Queen Elizabeth Stadium, Hong Kong

September 19

South Korea	130–51	Hong Kong
Scoring by half: 61–24, 69–27

Queen Elizabeth Stadium, Hong Kong

September 19

China	91–65	Japan
Scoring by half: 46–34, 45–31

Queen Elizabeth Stadium, Hong Kong

September 21

Hong Kong	75–77	Thailand
Scoring by half: 40–46, 35–31

Queen Elizabeth Stadium, Hong Kong

September 21

Japan	98–57	Malaysia
Scoring by half: 49–30, 49–27

Queen Elizabeth Stadium, Hong Kong

September 21

South Korea	101–68	China
Scoring by half: 51–34, 50–34

Queen Elizabeth Stadium, Hong Kong

== Final standing ==
Rank	Team	Record
1st place, gold medalist(s)	South Korea	6–0
2nd place, silver medalist(s)	China	6–1
3rd place, bronze medalist(s)	Japan	4–2
4	Malaysia	3–3
5	Thailand	2–4
6	Hong Kong	2–5
7	India	2–3
8	Singapore	2–3
9	Indonesia	2–3
10	Sri Lanka	0–5

== Awards ==
1980 Asian champions

South Korea
Sixth title
