= FIBA Women's Asia Cup =

Basketball tournament for women's national teams from Asia and Oceania

- Most recent season or competition: 2025 FIBA Women's Asia Cup
- Formerly: FIBA Asia Championship for Women; ABC Championship for Women
- Sport: Basketball
- Founded: 1965; 61 years ago
- First season: 1965
- No. of teams: 16
- Country: FIBA Asia member nations; FIBA Oceania member nations
- Continent: Asia-Pacific
- Most recent champion: Australia (1st title)
- Most titles: China; South Korea (12 titles)
- Qualification: FIBA Women's Basketball World Cup
- Related competitions: FIBA Asia Cup
- Website: www.fiba.basketball/history

The FIBA Women's Asia Cup is an international basketball tournament which takes place every two years for women's national teams from FIBA Asia, and since 2017 also including FIBA Oceania. It was known as the ABC Championship for Women until 2001, and the FIBA Asia Championship for Women until 2015. The winner of this tournament qualifies automatically for the FIBA Women's Basketball World Cup, while the next best five teams advance to the World Cup Qualifying Tournaments.

== Summary ==
#	Year	Hosts	Final			Third-place game			Teams
#	Year	Hosts	Champions	Score	Runners-up	Third place	Score	Fourth place	Teams
1	1965; Details	(South Korea); Seoul	South Korea	No playoffs	Japan	Republic of China	No playoffs	Philippines	5
2	1968; Details	(Taiwan); Taipei	South Korea	No playoffs	Japan	Republic of China	No playoffs	Thailand	8
3	1970; Details	(Malaysia); Kuala Lumpur	Japan	No playoffs	South Korea	Republic of China	No playoffs	Malaysia	10
4	1972; Details	(Taiwan); Taipei	South Korea	66–51	Republic of China	Thailand	70–54	Indonesia	5
5	1974; Details	(South Korea); Seoul	South Korea	No playoffs	Japan	Republic of China	No playoffs	Iran	7
6	1976; Details	Hong Kong	China	No playoffs	South Korea	Japan	No playoffs	Malaysia	7
7	1978; Details	(Malaysia); Kuala Lumpur	South Korea	No playoffs	China	Japan	No playoffs	Malaysia	9
8	1980; Details	Hong Kong	South Korea	No playoffs	China	Japan	No playoffs	Malaysia	10
9	1982; Details	(Japan); Tokyo	South Korea	No playoffs	China	Japan	No playoffs	Macau	9
10	1984; Details	(China); Shanghai	South Korea	62–61	China	Japan	81–53	Philippines	10
11	1986; Details	(Malaysia); Kuala Lumpur	China	No playoffs	South Korea	Chinese Taipei	No playoffs	Japan	10
12	1988; Details	Hong Kong	South Korea	No playoffs	China	Chinese Taipei	No playoffs	Japan	9
13	1990; Details	Singapore	China	No playoffs	South Korea	Japan	No playoffs	Chinese Taipei	11
14	1992; Details	(South Korea); Seoul	China	89–76	South Korea	Japan	79–75	Chinese Taipei	7
15	1994; Details	(Japan); Sendai	China	74–66	South Korea	Japan	92–67	Chinese Taipei	11
16	1995; Details	(Japan); Shizuoka	China	94–69	South Korea	Japan	68–65	Chinese Taipei	12
17	1997; Details	(Thailand); Bangkok	South Korea	74–61	Japan	China	101–63	Chinese Taipei	14
18	1999; Details	(Japan); Shizuoka	South Korea	68–65	Japan	Chinese Taipei	68–57	China	9
19	2001; Details	(Thailand); Bangkok	China	105–76	Japan	South Korea	78–63	Chinese Taipei	13
20	2004; Details	(Japan); Sendai	China	92–80	Japan	South Korea	88–59	Chinese Taipei	9
21	2005; Details	(China); Qinhuangdao	China	73–67	South Korea	Chinese Taipei	73–62	Japan	13
22	2007; Details	(South Korea); Incheon	South Korea	79–73	China	Japan	73–70	Chinese Taipei	12
23	2009; Details	(India); Chennai	China	91–71	South Korea	Japan	72–57	Chinese Taipei	12
24	2011; Details	(Japan); Omura	China	65–62	South Korea	Japan	83–56	Chinese Taipei	12
25	2013; Details	(Thailand); Bangkok	Japan	65–43	South Korea	China	61–53	Chinese Taipei	12
26	2015; Details	(China); Wuhan	Japan	85–50	China	South Korea	52–45	Chinese Taipei	12
27	2017; Details	(India); Bangalore	Japan	74–73	Australia	China	75–51	South Korea	15
28	2019; Details	(India); Bangalore	Japan	71–68	China	Australia	98–62	South Korea	8
29	2021; Details	(Jordan); Amman	Japan	78–73	China	Australia	88–58	South Korea	14
30	2023; Details	(Australia); Sydney	China	73–71	Japan	Australia	81–59	New Zealand	16
31	2025; Details	(China); Shenzhen	Australia	88–79	Japan	China	101–66	South Korea	16
32	2027; Details	(Philippines); Cebu City							16

== Medal table ==
As of 2025 tournament

Rank	Nation	Gold	Silver	Bronze	Total
1	South Korea	12	11	3	26
2	China	12	9	4	25
3	Japan	6	9	12	27
4	Australia	1	1	3	5
5	Chinese Taipei	0	1	8	9
6	Thailand	0	0	1	1
Totals (6 entries)		31	31	31	93

== Tournament awards ==
Most recent award winners (2025)

Year	Winner
2025	(Australia) Alexandra Fowler

Year	Player	Position	Team
2025	Stephanie Reid	Guard	Australia
2025	Park Ji-hyun	Guard	South Korea
2025	Kokoro Tanaka	Guard	Japan
2025	Alexandra Fowler	Forward	Australia
2025	Han Xu	Center	China

== Participating nations ==
Country	(South Korea) 1965	(Taiwan) 1968	(Malaysia) 1970	(Taiwan) 1972	(South Korea) 1974	(Hong Kong) 1976	(Malaysia) 1978	(Hong Kong) 1980	(Japan) 1982	(China) 1984	(Malaysia) 1986	(Hong Kong) 1988	(Singapore) 1990	(South Korea) 1992	(Japan) 1994	(Japan) 1995	(Thailand) 1997	(Japan) 1999	(Thailand) 2001	(Japan) 2004
Cambodia					6th															
China						1st	2nd	2nd	2nd	2nd	1st	2nd	1st	1st	1st	1st	3rd	4th	1st	1st
Chinese Taipei	3rd	3rd	3rd	2nd	3rd						3rd	3rd	4th	4th	4th	4th	4th	3rd	4th	4th
Hong Kong		7th	8th	5th	5th	7th	5th	6th	7th	9th		6th	8th	5th	5th	8th	10th	8th	10th	9th
India			10th					7th	9th	7th	7th	8th	7th	6th			9th		8th	7th
Indonesia			5th	4th			7th	9th			10th		9th		11th	12th	11th			
Iran					4th															
Japan	2nd	2nd	1st		2nd	3rd	3rd	3rd	3rd	3rd	4th	4th	3rd	3rd	3rd	3rd	2nd	2nd	2nd	2nd
Jordan																11th				
Kazakhstan															6th	6th	7th		6th	
Kyrgyzstan															7th	5th	6th			
Lebanon																			13th	
Macau									4th	8th							14th		12th	
Malaysia	5th	5th	4th			4th	4th	4th	6th	5th	6th	5th	5th		9th	10th	8th	7th	9th	6th
North Korea													6th					6th		
Philippines	4th	6th				6th	8th		8th	4th					10th	9th				8th
Singapore		8th	7th			5th	6th	8th	5th	6th	8th	9th	11th				13th			
South Korea	1st	1st	2nd	1st	1st	2nd	1st	1st	1st	1st	2nd	1st	2nd	2nd	2nd	2nd	1st	1st	3rd	3rd
Sri Lanka							9th	10th		10th			10th	7th			12th	9th	11th	
Syria											9th									
Thailand		4th	6th	3rd				5th			5th	7th			8th	7th	5th	5th	5th	5th
Uzbekistan																			7th	
Vietnam			9th		7th															
Teams	5	8	10	5	7	7	9	10	9	10	10	9	11	7	11	12	14	9	13	9

Country	(China) 2005	(South Korea) 2007	(India) 2009	(Japan) 2011	(Thailand) 2013	(China) 2015	(India) 2017	(India) 2019	(Jordan) 2021	(Australia) 2023	(China) 2025	(Philippines) 2027	Years
Australia							2nd	3rd	3rd	3rd	1st	Q	6
Cambodia													1
China	1st	2nd	1st	1st	3rd	2nd	3rd	2nd	2nd	1st	3rd	Q	27
Chinese Taipei	3rd	4th	4th	4th	4th	4th	5th	6th	6th	8th	9th	Q	27
Cook Islands											15th		1
Fiji							14th						1
Hong Kong	9th	8th			12th	11th							22
India	10th	7th	6th	6th	5th	6th	9th	8th	8th		13th		21
Indonesia				9th	9th				11th	9th	8th		13
Iran									14th	10th	10th		4
Japan	4th	3rd	3rd	3rd	1st	1st	1st	1st	1st	2nd	2nd	Q	31
Jordan									10th	12th			3
Kazakhstan	7th		9th	8th	6th	9th	10th		12th	14th	14th		13
Kyrgyzstan													3
Lebanon			8th	5th			11th		9th	7th	7th	Q	7
Macau													4
Malaysia	8th	6th	7th	7th	8th	10th				13th			24
Mongolia										15th	12th		2
New Zealand							6th	5th	5th	4th	5th	Q	6
North Korea	6th					8th	8th						5
Philippines	11th		10th		10th	7th	7th	7th	7th	6th	6th	Q	19
Singapore	12th	11th		11th			13th						15
South Korea	2nd	1st	2nd	2nd	2nd	3rd	4th	4th	4th	5th	4th	Q	32
Sri Lanka	13th	12th	12th	12th		12th	15th			16th			15
Syria									13th				2
Tahiti											16th		1
Thailand	5th	5th	5th		7th	5th				11th	11th		19
Uzbekistan		9th	11th	10th	11th		12th						6
Vietnam		10th											3
Teams	13	12	12	12	12	12	15	8	14	16	16	16	—

== Debut of teams ==
A total of 29 national teams have appeared in at least one FIBA Women's Asia Cup in the history of the tournament through the 2025 competition. Countries competing in their first Asia Cup are listed below by year.

Year	Debutants	Number
1965	Chinese Taipei, Japan, Malaysia, Philippines, South Korea	5
1968	Hong Kong, Singapore, Thailand	8
1970	India, Indonesia, Vietnam	11
1972	None	11
1974	Cambodia, Iran	13
1976	China	14
1978	Sri Lanka	15
1980	None	15
1982	Macau	16
1984	None	16
1986	Syria	17
1988	None	17
1990	North Korea	18
1992	None	18
1994	Kazakhstan, Kyrgyzstan	20
1995	Jordan	21
1997	None	21
1999	None	21
2001	Lebanon, Uzbekistan	23
2004	None	23
2005	None	23
2007	None	23
2009	None	23
2011	None	23
2013	None	23
2015	None	23
2017	Australia, Fiji, New Zealand	26
2019	None	26
2021	None	26
2023	Mongolia	27
2025	Cook Islands, Tahiti	29
2027	TBD	29
Total		29

== General statistics ==
All-time records, as of the 2023 FIBA Women's Asia Cup (Division A). Results of the teams participating in Division B of the tournament are also included.

Team	Played	Won	Lost	Percentage
Australia	24	17	7	70.8%
Cambodia	4	1	3	25%
China	159	133	26	83.6%
Chinese Taipei	158	67	91	42.4%
Fiji	6	1	5	16.7%
Hong Kong	119	38	81	31.9%
India	109	38	71	34.9%
Indonesia	68	24	44	35.3%
Iran	10	2	8	20%
Japan	187	134	53	71.7%
Jordan	9	4	5	44.4%
Kazakhstan	56	32	24	57.1%
Kyrgyzstan	15	5	10	33.3%
Lebanon	30	17	13	56.7%
Macau	20	5	15	25%
Malaysia	135	65	70	48.1%
Mongolia	4	1	3	25%
New Zealand	22	10	12	45.5%
North Korea	25	18	7	72%
Philippines	94	34	60	36.2%
Singapore	91	23	68	25.3%
South Korea	196	157	39	80.1%
Sri Lanka	70	3	67	4.3%
Syria	10	4	6	40%
Thailand	98	35	63	35.7%
Uzbekistan	30	12	18	40%
Vietnam	19	3	16	15.8%

== See also ==
- Basketball at the Asian Games
- FIBA Asia Cup, its men's counterpart
- FIBA Asia Under-20 Championship for Women
- FIBA Under-18 Women's Asia Cup
- FIBA Under-16 Women's Asia Cup
