= 1978 ABC Championship for Women =

1978 FIBA Women's Asia Cup
7th Asian Women's Basketball Championship

Tournament details
- Host country: Malaysia
- Dates: July 25 – August 5
- Teams: 9 (from all Asian federations)
- Venue: 1 (in 1 host city)

Final positions
- Champions: South Korea (5th title)

The 1978 Asian Basketball Confederation Championship for Women were held in Kuala Lumpur, Malaysia.

== Results ==
Team	Pld	W	L	PF	PA	PD	Pts	Tiebreaker
South Korea	8	8	0	711	247	+464	16	
China	8	7	1	913	407	+506	15	
Japan	8	6	2	727	323	+404	14	
Malaysia	8	5	3	542	524	+18	13	
Hong Kong	8	3	5	384	651	−267	11	1–0
Singapore	8	3	5	393	604	−211	11	0–1
Indonesia	8	2	6	324	641	−317	10	
Philippines	8	2	6	325	535	−210	8	1–0
Sri Lanka	8	0	8	364	751	−387	8	0–1

July 25

Malaysia	94–43	Sri Lanka
Scoring by half: 60–16, 34–27

Stadium Negara, Kuala Lumpur

July 25

China	122–55	Singapore
Scoring by half: 64–25, 58–30

Stadium Negara, Kuala Lumpur

July 26

South Korea	105–25	Hong Kong
Scoring by half: 47–10, 58–15

Stadium Negara, Kuala Lumpur

July 26

Indonesia	26–127	Japan
Scoring by half: 16–62, 10–65

Stadium Negara, Kuala Lumpur

July 26

Singapore	37–58	Malaysia
Scoring by half: 19–29, 18–29

Stadium Negara, Kuala Lumpur

July 27

Sri Lanka	52–127	China
Scoring by half: 16–67, 36–60

Stadium Negara, Kuala Lumpur

July 27

Indonesia	23–109	South Korea
Scoring by half: 12–56, 11–53

Stadium Negara, Kuala Lumpur

July 27

Japan	125–40	Hong Kong
Scoring by half: 61–19, 64–21

Stadium Negara, Kuala Lumpur

July 28
14:00

Singapore	30–86	Japan
Scoring by half: 14–45, 16–41

Stadium Negara, Kuala Lumpur

July 28
15:30

Hong Kong	84–54	Sri Lanka
Scoring by half: 32–24, 52–30

Stadium Negara, Kuala Lumpur

July 28
19:30

China	114–56	Malaysia
Scoring by half: 52–26, 62–30

Stadium Negara, Kuala Lumpur

July 28
21:00

South Korea	2–0	Philippines
Walkover

Stadium Negara, Kuala Lumpur

July 29

Hong Kong	53–51	Singapore
Scoring by half: 22–30, 31–21

Stadium Negara, Kuala Lumpur

July 29

Philippines	0–2	Indonesia
Walkover

Stadium Negara, Kuala Lumpur

July 30

South Korea	142–32	Singapore
Scoring by half: 70–10, 72–22

Stadium Negara, Kuala Lumpur

July 30

Sri Lanka	37–93	Japan
Scoring by half: 20–50, 17–43

Stadium Negara, Kuala Lumpur

July 30

Malaysia	101–54	Philippines
Scoring by half: 51–21, 50–33

Stadium Negara, Kuala Lumpur

July 30

China	137–60	Indonesia
Scoring by half: 77–32, 60–28

Stadium Negara, Kuala Lumpur

August 1

Malaysia	92–45	Indonesia
Scoring by half: 39–20, 53–25

Stadium Negara, Kuala Lumpur

August 1

Philippines	60–62	Singapore
Scoring by half: 28–31, 32–31

Stadium Negara, Kuala Lumpur

August 1

Hong Kong	24–141	China
Scoring by half: 12–70, 12–71

Stadium Negara, Kuala Lumpur

August 1

Japan	50–64	South Korea
Scoring by half: 26–36, 24–28

Stadium Negara, Kuala Lumpur

August 2

Singapore	71–36	Sri Lanka
Scoring by half: 39–19, 32–17

Stadium Negara, Kuala Lumpur

August 2

China	139–56	Philippines
Scoring by half: 74–18, 65–38

Stadium Negara, Kuala Lumpur

August 2

Indonesia	47–57	Hong Kong
Scoring by half: 24–26, 23–31

Stadium Negara, Kuala Lumpur

August 2

South Korea	93–39	Malaysia
Scoring by half: 46–18, 47–21

Stadium Negara, Kuala Lumpur

August 3

Sri Lanka	17–133	South Korea
Scoring by half: 13–63, 4–70

Stadium Negara, Kuala Lumpur

August 3

Malaysia	76–51	Hong Kong
Scoring by half: 39–26, 37–25

Stadium Negara, Kuala Lumpur

August 3

Philippines	28–118	Japan
Scoring by half: 11–67, 17–51

Stadium Negara, Kuala Lumpur

August 4

Philippines	75–61	Sri Lanka
Scoring by half: 45–35, 30–26

Stadium Negara, Kuala Lumpur

August 4

Indonesia	47–55	Singapore
Scoring by half: 30–32, 17–23

Stadium Negara, Kuala Lumpur

August 4

Japan	41–72	China
Scoring by half: 21–33, 20–39

Stadium Negara, Kuala Lumpur

August 5

Hong Kong	50–52	Philippines
Scoring by half: 23–25, 27–27

Stadium Negara, Kuala Lumpur

August 5

Sri Lanka	64–74	Indonesia
Scoring by half: 27–40, 37–34

Stadium Negara, Kuala Lumpur

August 5

Malaysia	26–87	Japan
Scoring by half: 16–45, 10–42

Stadium Negara, Kuala Lumpur

August 5

China	61–63	South Korea
Scoring by half: 23–28, 38–35

Stadium Negara, Kuala Lumpur

== Final standing ==
Qualified for the 1979 FIBA World Championship for Women as hosts and Asian Champions.
Qualified for the 1979 FIBA World Championship for Women

Rank	Team	Record
1st place, gold medalist(s)	South Korea	8–0
2nd place, silver medalist(s)	China	7–1
3rd place, bronze medalist(s)	Japan	6–2
4	Malaysia	5–3
5	Hong Kong	3–5
6	Singapore	3–5
7	Indonesia	2–6
8	Philippines	2–6
9	Sri Lanka	0–8

== Awards ==
1978 Asian champions

South Korea
Fifth title
