= 1992 ABC Championship for Women =

1992 FIBA Women's Asia Cup
14th Asian Women's Basketball Championship

Tournament details
- Host country: South Korea
- Dates: March 21–30
- Teams: 7 (from all Asian federations)
- Venue: 1 (in 1 host city)

Final positions
- Champions: China (4th title)

The 1992 Asian Basketball Confederation Championship for Women were held in Seoul, South Korea.

== Preliminary round ==
Team	Pld	W	L	PF	PA	PD	Pts
China	6	6	0	590	303	+287	12
South Korea	6	5	1	614	324	+290	11
Japan	6	4	2	611	369	+242	10
Chinese Taipei	6	3	3	465	383	+82	9
Hong Kong	6	2	4	308	533	−225	8
India	6	1	5	299	603	−304	7
Sri Lanka	6	0	6	213	585	−372	6

March 21

South Korea	83–63	Chinese Taipei
Scoring by half: 48–39, 35–24

Seoul

March 21

Sri Lanka	33–113	China
Scoring by half: 14–58, 19–55

Seoul

March 21

Japan	121–36	Hong Kong
Scoring by half: 70–20, 51–16

Seoul

March 22

Hong Kong	82–38	Sri Lanka
Scoring by half: 47–23, 35–15

Seoul

March 22

India	41–127	South Korea
Scoring by half: 10–49, 31–78

Seoul

March 22

China	83–80	Japan
Scoring by half: 53–49, 30–31

Seoul

March 24

South Korea	110–27	Sri Lanka
Scoring by half: 50–8, 60–19

Seoul

March 24

Chinese Taipei	50–79	China
Scoring by half: 27–43, 23–36

Seoul

March 24

India	58–71	Hong Kong
Scoring by half: 29–39, 29–32

Seoul

March 25

Hong Kong	41–88	Chinese Taipei
Scoring by half: 24–42, 17–46

Seoul

March 25

Japan	70–92	South Korea
Scoring by half: 33–46, 37–46

Seoul

March 25

China	130–26	India
Scoring by half: 68–14, 62–12

Seoul

March 26

India	48–116	Japan
Scoring by half: 23–60, 25–56

Seoul

March 26

South Korea	124–42	Hong Kong
Scoring by half: 54–19, 70–23

Seoul

March 26

Chinese Taipei	80–30	Sri Lanka
Scoring by half: 40–15, 40–15

Seoul

March 28

China	81–78	South Korea
Scoring by half: 33–36, 48–42

Seoul

March 28

Japan	104–83	Chinese Taipei
Scoring by half: 55–42, 49–41

Seoul

March 28

Sri Lanka	58–80	India
Scoring by half: 25–36, 33–44

Seoul

March 29

Sri Lanka	27–120	Japan
Scoring by half: 10–70, 17–50

Seoul

March 29

India	46–101	Chinese Taipei
Scoring by half: 22–56, 24–45

Seoul

March 29

Hong Kong	36–104	China
Scoring by half: 6–49, 30–55

Seoul

== Final round ==
=== 3rd place ===
March 30

Chinese Taipei	75–79	Japan
Scoring by half: 46–45, 29–34

Seoul

=== Final ===
March 30

South Korea	76–89	China
Scoring by half: 38–40, 38–49

Seoul

== Final standing ==
Qualified for the Olympic Qualifying Tournament

Rank	Team	Record
1st place, gold medalist(s)	China	7–0
2nd place, silver medalist(s)	South Korea	5–2
3rd place, bronze medalist(s)	Japan	5–2
4	Chinese Taipei	3–4
5	Hong Kong	2–4
6	India	1–5
7	Sri Lanka	0–6

== Awards ==
1992 Asian champions

China
Fourth title
