= North Korea women's national basketball team =

Women's national basketball team representing North Korea

North Korea
- FIBA ranking: NR (18 March 2026)
- Joined FIBA: 1947
- FIBA zone: FIBA Asia
- National federation: Amateur Basketball Association of DPR of Korea
- Coach: Kim Chol-sun

Olympic Games
- Appearances: None

World Cup
- Appearances: None

Asia Cup
- Appearances: 5
- Medals: None
Home	Away

The North Korea women's national basketball team (recognized as Korea DPR by FIBA) is the nationally controlled basketball team representing North Korea at international basketball competitions for women. It is administered by the Amateur Basketball Association of DPR of Korea.

== Asian championship ==
North Korea played in five Asian championships, most recently participating at the 2017 FIBA Asia Women's Cup.

== Current squad ==
Roster for the 2017 FIBA Women's Asia Cup.

North Korea women's national basketball team roster
Players
Coaches

Pos.	No.	Name	Age – Date of birth	Height	Club	Ctr.
G	3	Jang Mi-gyong	24 – 4 November 1992	1.67 m (5 ft 6 in)
G	5	Kim Hye-yon	19 – 16 February 1998	1.72 m (5 ft 8 in)
G	6	Kim Un-jong	23 – 12 October 1993	1.64 m (5 ft 5 in)
G	8	Kim Hyang-ok	28 – 20 January 1989	1.68 m (5 ft 6 in)
F	9	Kim Mi-hyang	25 – 13 February 1992	1.75 m (5 ft 9 in)
F	10	Ri Jong-ok	25 – 16 March 1992	1.74 m (5 ft 9 in)
F	11	Pak Hyang-jong	24 – 12 December 1992	1.75 m (5 ft 9 in)
C	12	Ro Suk-yong	24 – 28 January 1993	1.81 m (5 ft 11 in)
F	14	Ko Un-gyong	19 – 14 April 1998	1.80 m (5 ft 11 in)
F	15	Kong Su-yon	17 – 14 March 2000	1.80 m (5 ft 11 in)
G	16	Kim Ryu-jong	20 – 2 June 1997	1.77 m (5 ft 10 in)
C	17	Pak Jin-a	14 – 5 May 2003	2.00 m (6 ft 7 in)

Head coach

- (North Korea) Kim Chol-sun

Assistant coach(es)

- (North Korea) Choe Song-hak

Legend

- Club – describes last
  club before the tournament
- Age – describes age
  on 23 July 2017

== Tournament records ==
=== Asian Games ===
Year	Rank	Pld	W	L
(Iran) 1974	4th place	4	1	3
(Thailand) 1978	Did not enter			
(India) 1982	4th place	4	0	4
(South Korea) 1986	Did not enter			
(China) 1990	5th place	5	1	4
(Japan) 1994– (Indonesia) 2018	Did not enter			
(China) 2022	4th place	6	3	3
Total		19	5	14

== See also ==
- North Korea women's national under-19 basketball team
