= Chinese Taipei women's national basketball team =

Chinese Taipei (Taiwan)
- FIBA ranking: 39 (14 September 2026)
- Joined FIBA: 1981
- FIBA zone: FIBA Asia
- National federation: CTBA
- Coach: Kenzo Maeda

World Cup
- Appearances: 4

Asia Cup
- Appearances: 25
- Medals: 1972; 1965, 1968, 1970, 1974, 1986, 1988, 1999, 2005
Home	Away

The Chinese Taipei women's national basketball team is a national women's basketball team of Taiwan. In sports, Taiwan uses the name "Chinese Taipei" due to political relations with People's Republic of China.

== Tournaments record ==
=== Asia Cup record ===
- 1965 – 3rd place
- 1968 – 3rd place
- 1970 – 3rd place
- 1972 – 2nd place
- 1974 – 3rd place
- 1986 – 3rd place
- 1988 – 3rd place
- 1990 – 4th place
- 1992 – 4th place
- 1994 – 4th place
- 1995 – 4th place
- 1997 – 4th place
- 1999 – 3rd place
- 2001 – 4th place
- 2004 – 4th place
- 2005 – 3rd place
- 2007 – 4th place
- 2009 – 4th place
- 2011 – 4th place
- 2013 – 4th place
- 2015 – 4th place
- 2017 – 5th place
- 2019 – 6th place
- 2021 – 6th place
- 2023 – 8th place
- 2025 – 1st place in Division B
- 2027 – Qualified

=== Asian Games record ===
- (Japan) 1994 – 4th place
- (Thailand) 1998 – 4th place
- (South Korea) 2002 – 3rd place
- (Qatar) 2006 – 2nd place
- (China) 2010 – 4th place
- (South Korea) 2014 – 4th place
- (Indonesia) 2018 – 4th place
- (China) 2022 – 7th place
- (Japan) 2026 – 4th place

== Current roster ==
Roster for the 2023 FIBA Women's Asia Cup.

Chinese Taipei women's national basketball team roster
Players
Coaches

Pos.	No.	Name	Age – Date of birth	Height	Club	Ctr.
G	1	Liu Hsin-yu	24 – 23 November 1998	1.80 m (5 ft 11 in)	Cathay Life	(Taiwan)
PG	2	Pan Tzu-yin	30 – 23 July 1992	1.69 m (5 ft 7 in)
F	4	Chen Yen-yu	28 – 7 October 1994	1.69 m (5 ft 7 in)
C	5	Chen Meng-sin	23 – 7 October 1999	1.64 m (5 ft 5 in)
G	6	Chen Wei-an	27 – 1 November 1995	1.76 m (5 ft 9 in)	Cathay Life	(Taiwan)
C	7	Wu Yu-hsuan	25 – 9 October 1997	1.83 m (6 ft 0 in)
F	10	Han Ya-en	28 – 1 January 1995	1.80 m (5 ft 11 in)	Cathay Life	(Taiwan)
C	11	Cheng I-hsiu	30 – 24 June 1993	1.78 m (5 ft 10 in)	Cathay Life	(Taiwan)
G	12	Lin Yu-ting	29 – 25 January 1994	1.78 m (5 ft 10 in)	Cathay Life	(Taiwan)
F	17	Huang Ling-chuan	28 – 6 December 1994	1.80 m (5 ft 11 in)	Cathay Life	(Taiwan)
SG	24	Liu Hsi-yeh (C)	31 – 10 October 1991	1.75 m (5 ft 9 in)
G	31	Chang Chi-fang	30 – 16 January 1993	1.73 m (5 ft 8 in)

Head coach

- (Taiwan) Cheng Hui-yun

Assistant coach(es)

- (Taiwan) Lin Chi-wen

Legend

- (C) Team captain
- Club – describes last
  club before the tournament
- Age – describes age
  on 26 June 2023

== See also ==
- Chinese Taipei men's national basketball team
- Chinese Taipei women's national under-19 basketball team
- Chinese Taipei women's national under-17 basketball team
- Chinese Taipei women's national 3x3 team
