= FIBA Women's World Ranking =

FIBA's rankings of national women's basketball teams

Top 20 Rankings as of 14 September 2026
Rank	Change	Team	Points
1	Steady	United States	1076.1
2	Steady	France	936.4
3	▲1	Spain	885.1
4	▲1	Germany	782.3
5	▼2	Australia	723.7
6	▼1	Belgium	714.2
8	▼3	China	711.7
8	Steady	Nigeria	585.2
9	▲1	Japan	572.9
10	▼1	Brazil	566.6
11	▼4	Canada	565.7
12	▲1	Puerto Rico	543.5
13	▲1	Italy	480.4
14	▲1	South Korea	475.1
15	▼3	Serbia	471.7
16	▲3	Hungary	418.8
17	▼1	Turkey	398.8
18	▼1	Czech Republic	397.3
19	▼1	Mali	368.9
20	Steady	Colombia	318.6
*Change from 1 April 2026
Complete rankings at FIBA.com

The FIBA Women's World Ranking is the FIBA's rankings of national women's basketball teams. FIBA ranks women's national teams in both senior and junior competitions.

The current ranking system, introduced in 2026, compares teams based on the total rating points they earn in all games. Each game, both teams are awarded rating points based on the region and competition stage of the game, with additional multipliers applied to the winning team's points earned based on the strength of opponent, site of game and margin of victory.

== History ==
In its ranking system for women's national teams before 2019, FIBA used a competition-based system which awarded teams points based on the final standings of FIBA final tournaments (FIBA Women's World Cup, Olympic games and the four continental tournaments), with different tournaments weighted differently. The points were used to determine the rankings, and took into account all tournaments played within the last two Olympic cycles (eight years).

From 2019-2026, FIBA which used a game-based system which compared teams based on the weighted average rating points they earn in games over the last eight years. Teams earned a certain amount of rating points for each game based on the margin of victory/defeat, site of game and strength of opponent. Each game's rating points were then weighted by factors including the time of game, competition/region, competition stage and round reached.

== Calculation ==
In 2026, FIBA updated their Women's World Ranking system. Teams earn rating points after each game based on the region and competition stage of the game, with additional multipliers applied to the winning team's points. Results in friendly matches are not included.

=== Points for losing team ===
The rating points awarded to the losing team, $G$, is calculated as follows:

$$G = B \cdot R \cdot S$$

Where:

- B – Base Factor (10)
- R – Region Factor
- S – Competition Stage Factor

Base Factor

To ensure a team's rating points are on a comparable scale to the previous FIBA Women's World Ranking system, a Base Factor B is set to 10.

Region Factor

A region factor R is calculated as:

$$R = R_\text{1} \cdot R_\text{2}$$

Where:

- R_{1} is a Region Strength Factor calculated taking into account historical results of matches between teams of different regions, with the factor recalculated and updated at least every four years. For 2026, when the ranking system was established, the values are:
  - 1 – Competitions involving teams from multiple regions, such as the FIBA Women's Basketball World Cup and Olympic games
  - 1 – FIBA Europe
  - 0.93 – FIBA Americas
  - 0.90 – FIBA Asia and FIBA Oceania
  - 0.74 – FIBA Africa
- R_{2} is a Region Structure Factor, used to adjust for differences in the number of games played in each region's continental championship. R_{2} is calculated by dividing the greatest number of rating points that a team could earn, per the method above, without the region factor for any continental championship (140 for the FIBA Women's AmeriCup) by the respective points a team could earn for their respective continental championship (FIBA Women's AmeriCup: 140; Eurobasket Women: 130; AfroBasket Women: 120; FIBA Women's Asia Cup: 105), producing the following values:
  - 1.333 – FIBA Women's Asia Cup
  - 1.167 – AfroBasket Women
  - 1.077 – Eurobasket Women
  - 1.0 – FIBA Women's AmeriCup
  - 1.0 – All games outside of continental championships (final tournament)

Competition Stage factor

To reward progress in competitions, a Competition Stage Factor S is applied based on the round of competition a game is played:

Competition stage		Continental championship	Olympics	FIBA Women's Basketball World Cup
Pre-qualifiers		0.25	0.350	0.5
Qualifiers		0.50	0.800	1.0
Final tournament	Group stage	1.00	1.750	2.0
Final tournament	Classification (9th-16th)	0.10	0.175	0.2
Final tournament	Play-off for quarter-final	0.10	0.175	0.2
Final tournament	Quarter-final	2.50	4.375	5.0
Final tournament	Classification (5th-8th)	2.00	3.500	4.0
Final tournament	Play-off for semi-final	0.10	0.175	0.2
Final tournament	Semi-final	3.50	6.125	7.0
Final tournament	3rd place game	3.00	5.250	6.0
Final tournament	Final	4.00	7.000	8.0

=== Points for winning team ===
The rating points awarded to the winning team, $G_{w}$, is calculated as follows:

$$G_{w} = G \cdot W \cdot O \cdot A \cdot M$$

Where:

- G – Rating points awarded to the losing team for the match (see above)
- W – Winning Factor
- O – Opponent Rating Factor
- A – Away Game Factor
- M – Margin of Victory Factor

Winning Factor

To ensure the winning team receives more rating points than the losing team, a Winning Factor W is applied as follows:

- 1.40 – Games in competitions that only use a round-robin format (such as qualifying tournaments for the Olympics and World Cup)
- 1.25 – All other games

Opponent Rating Factor

To recognize wins against more difficult teams, an Opponent Rating Factor O is calculated as follows:

$$O = 1 + 0.0001 \cdot T_{L}$$

where $T_{L}$ represents the pre-game total rating points of the opposing team

Away Game Factor

On average, it is more difficult to win away from home. An Away Game Factor A is awarded based on the site of the game as follows:

- 1.1 – The winning team played away from home
- 1 – The winning team played at home, or the game was at a neutral venue

Margin of Victory Factor

A Margin of Victory Factor M is awarded as follows:

- 1.05 – Win by 15 or more points
- 1 – Win by less than 15 points

== Cycles and updates ==
The rankings are updated and published twice a year, once in March and once after the respective major FIBA tournament (FIBA Women's Basketball World Cup, Olympics or continental championships).

Additionally, each team's total rating points are discounted by 25% annually to ensure the total rating points do not grow indefinitely. With each team having their total points reduced by the same factor, the order of teams in the ranking remains the same.

== FIBA Girl's World Ranking ==
In addition to the senior world ranking, FIBA also produces a FIBA Girl's World Ranking, which is a combined ranking for women's youth teams based on results in under-16 to under-19 age group competitions.
