= FIBA Women's Basketball World Cup =

International women's basketball tournament

- Current season, competition or edition: 2026 FIBA Women's Basketball World Cup
- Sport: Basketball
- Founded: 1953; 73 years ago
- First season: 1953
- No. of teams: 16
- Countries: FIBA members
- Continent: FIBA (International)
- Most recent champions: United States (12th title)
- Most titles: United States (12 titles)
- Website: www.fiba.basketball/history

The FIBA Women's Basketball World Cup, also known as the Basketball World Cup for Women or simply the FIBA Women's World Cup, is an international basketball tournament for women's national teams held quadrennially. It was created by the International Basketball Federation (FIBA). Its inaugural game was in 1953 in Chile, three years after the first men's World Championship. For most of its early history, it was not held in the same year as the men's championship, and was not granted a consistent quadrennial cycle until 1967. After the 1983 event, FIBA changed the scheduling so that the women's tournament would be held in even-numbered non-Olympic years, a change that had come to the men's tournament in 1970.

Formerly known as the FIBA World Championship for Women, the name changed shortly after its 2014 edition. From 1986 through 2014, the tournament was held in the same year as the men's FIBA Basketball World Cup, though in different countries. After the 2014 editions of both championships, the men's event was rescheduled on a new four-year cycle (the latest in 2019) to avoid conflict with the men's FIFA World Cup, but the Women's World Cup remains on the same four-year cycle, with editions held in the same years as the men's FIFA World Cup and the finals tournament played a few months after it. The 2022 FIBA Women's Basketball World Cup was held in Sydney, Australia. The 2026 FIBA Women's Basketball World Cup was held in Berlin, Germany.

== History ==
Only four nations have won titles in the history of the Women's World Cup. The first tournament was held in 1953 in Chile, with the participation of ten national teams. Despite losing to Brazil in the final round, the United States won the inaugural title. The next tournament which was held in 1957 in Brazil, marked the beginning of the long-time rivalry between the US team and Soviet team, who debuted at the World Championship. The first official match between these teams was played on the last day of the tournament, it was also the decisive match of the championship. Soviet players led after the first half (27–24), but in the second half the Americans managed to achieve victory (51–48) and won their second World title.

The third World Championship was held in 1959 in Moscow, Soviet Union. Due to international political tensions, caused by the Cold War, the United States and its allies didn't participate at this tournament with the exception of South Korea. Thus, seven of the eight countries that played in the tournament were Eastern Bloc countries. In the absence of the US team, the Soviet team won their maiden World title while Bulgaria took silver medals and Czechoslovakia finished third. But at the next World Championship, which was held in 1964 in Peru, all these Eastern European teams also occupied whole podium – the Soviet Union won their second title in a row, Czechoslovakia won silver medals, Bulgaria took bronze while United States finished only at fourth place. This tournament marked the beginning of the era of dominance of the Soviet Union in world women's basketball, which lasted for next two decades. Under leadership of head coach Lidiya Alekseyeva, Soviet team won three next World Championships held in 1967 (Czechoslovakia), 1971 (Brazil) and 1975 (Colombia). The vast majority of medals at these tournaments were won by Eastern European and East Asian teams while United States even failed to qualify into final round. In general, from 1959 to 1975 Soviet team won record five titles in a row by winning all their 40 matches with margin of 10 points and more. Therefore, it was not surprising when the Soviet Union won the inaugural women's Olympic tournament which was held in 1976 in Montreal, Canada (by winning all five matches). Despite losing to Japan and the Soviet Union, the United States managed to finish second and capture silver medals while Bulgaria took Olympic bronze.

Unfortunately, the next world women's basketball major tournaments were clouded by a series of political boycotts caused by the Cold War. Firstly, the Soviet Union and four other Eastern Bloc countries withdrew from next World Championships which was held in 1979 in South Korea. In spite of losing to the hosts (82–94), United States won all other matches and captured a gold medal thanks to a better head-to-head point difference among the Top 3 teams. It was the third World title for the US team and the first since 1957. The next year the United States boycotted 1980 Olympic tournament which was held in Moscow, Soviet Union. In their absence, Soviet team captured their second Olympic title by winning all 6 matches while the Bulgaria and the Yugoslavia took silver and bronze medals respectively. Therefore, the next World Championship which was held in 1983 in Brazil became the first international major competition for seven years with participation of all the world's top teams. The Soviet Union captured their sixth World title by winning all 10 of their matches, but this victory was the most difficult one. In the final group round, the Soviet team won the match against United States with a margin of only one point (85–84) after losing 40–49 at the end of first half. Later in the final match between these two teams the Soviets lost the first half with a score of 37–40, but also managed to achieve victory with a margin of only two points (84–82). Both of those matches had provided other teams with the knowledge that the Soviet Union wasn't as overwhelming a force as it was years prior. The China won their first World Championship medal after their victory over South Korea in a bronze medal match (71–63). Next year the Soviet Union and Hungary boycotted 1984 Olympic tournament which was held in Los Angeles, United States thus allowing the hosts to win their maiden Olympic title. South Korea and China took silver and bronze Olympic medals respectively.

Fortunately, all the world's top teams were able to partake in the next World Championship, which was held in 1986 in the Soviet Union. One month before start of tournament, United States won the basketball tournament at the 1986 Goodwill Games in Moscow by beating the Soviet Union with great margin of 23 points (83–60). Both reigning Olympic Champions (United States) and World Champions (Soviet Union) won all their group and semifinal matches, and then met in the final match in Moscow. In this final, US team once again proved their superiority by winning with a margin of 20 points (108–88) thus ending the remarkable winning streak of the Soviet team at the World Championships which lasted 56 consecutive matches. This victory became the turning point which marked beginning of the era of dominance of the United States in world women's basketball. At the 1988 Summer Olympics in Seoul, South Korea, the US team defended their Olympic title by beating the Yugoslavia in the final match (77–70) while the Soviet team failed to reach the final and unexpectedly finished only in third place for the first time in their history. At the next World Championship which was held in 1990 in Malaysia, the Soviet Union lost in the second group round to Czechoslovakia (79–82) and Yugoslavia (63–64) and finished only at fifth place. It was the first and only time the Soviet women's team had failed to reach the podium at the international level competition. Like two years prior, the United States and Yugoslavia once more met in the final match, and US team achieved victory again (88–78) by winning their sixth World title. Two years later, the United States went to 1992 Summer Olympics in Barcelona, Spain in the status of favorites to win - especially after the Yugoslavian team was banned from competition due to United Nations sanctions. However, the former Soviet players who competed for the Unified Team, as a result of Soviet Union's dissolution in December 1991, managed to achieve surprising success after a shocking victory over United States in the semifinals (79–73) and managed a victory over the China in the final match (76–66). The US team finished in third place. This was the last victory of Soviet-born players at the World level competitions, and the Unified Team ceased to exist after that.

The 12th World Championship was held in Australia in 1994, after the dissolution of Soviet Union, SFR Yugoslavia and Czechoslovakia. Slovakia became only newly formed national team who managed to qualify to this World Championship. In such situation, United States aimed to return at first position. However, they surprisingly lost semifinal match to Brazil (107–110) and once again finished only at the third place. In the final match, Brazil beat China (96–87) thus breaking US-Soviet duopoly on World Championship which lasted for 41 years. Two years later United States took revenge at the home 1996 Olympic tournament at Atlanta by beating Brazil in the final match with margin of 24 points (111–87). This victory marked beginning of US dominance at the Olympic Games – from 1996 to 2021, they won seven Olympic titles in a row with remarkable winning streak of 55 consecutive matches at Olympic tournaments.

The 13th World Championship took place in 1998 in Germany. Russian team participated at this tournament for first time after dissolution of Soviet Union. In the second group round, they lost to United States with great margin of 36 points (60–96) but then managed to reach final where met with US team again. In the final match, United States faced with much stronger resistance – Russia led with margin of 9 points after first half (28–37), but in the second half US team managed to reach advantage and achieved final victory (71–65). Australia won World Championship bronze medals for first time in their history. The similar story took place at the next World Championship which took place in 2002 in China – United States defeated Russian team at the preliminary round with margin of 34 points (89–55) but later they faced with stronger resistance from Russian side in the final. Despite this, US team won final match with margin of 5 points (79–74) and captured seventh World title while Australia took bronze medals for second time in a row. At the next 2006 World Championship in Brazil, Russian team lost to United States at the preliminary round (80–90) and then lost two more matches at the group stage. But after group stage, Russia achieved remarkable victory by beating US team in semifinals (75–68). It was only first defeat of United States for 12 years at the either Olympic Games or World Championships (and the last till nowadays). They finished only at third place after beating hosts in a bronze medal match (99–59). After this success, Russia was unable to show the same resistance to Australian team who won final match with margin of 17 points (91–74). Therefore, Australia became only fourth national team to win either Olympic or World title in the history of women's basketball.

The next World Championship took place in 2010 in the Czech Republic. Many people waited for another match between United States and Russia in playoffs. Both teams won all their group matches but then Russia suffered shocking defeat to Belarus in the quarterfinals (53–70). The defending champions, Australia also surprisingly lost quarterfinal match to hosts - Czech team (68–79). In the semifinals, Czech Republic beat Belarus in overtime (81–77) and reach final match for the first time after dissolution of Czechoslovakia. However, in the final match United States looked stronger and managed to return World title after victory with margin of 20 points (89–69). Spain won World Championship medals for first time in their history after beating Belarus in a bronze medal match (77–68). The next three edition were held without participation of Russian team who failed to qualify to 2014 and 2018 tournaments and was banned from participation in the 2022 World Cup due to the invasion of Ukraine. In 2014 US team repeated their success by beating Spain in the final match (77–64). The home team, Turkey managed to reach semifinals for first time in history but failed to win medals after losing to Australia in a bronze medal match (44–74). At the next 2018 World Cup in Spain, United States captured gold again after victory over Australia in a final match (73–56). The home team, Spain reached podium for third time in a row after victory over Belgium in a bronze medal match (67–60). The number of participants of the 2022 World Cup was reduced from 16 to 12 teams. United States won gold medals for fourth time in a row by beating China in a final match (83–61). Therefore, US team won eight of last ten World tournaments, captured their 11th World title and extended own winning streak at these competitions to 30 consecutive matches. The home team, Australia defeated Canada in a bronze medal match (95–65) and thus reached podium for third time in a row.

For the 2026 edition of the tournament in Germany, 16 teams participated.

== Total times teams hosted by confederation ==
Confederations and years italicized and in bold have an upcoming competition.

Confederation	Total	(Hosts) Years
FIBA Africa	0	
FIBA Americas	7	(Chile) 1953, (Brazil) 1957, (Peru) 1964, (Brazil) 1971, (Colombia) 1975, (Brazil) 1983, (Brazil) 2006
FIBA Asia	5	(South Korea) 1979, (Malaysia) 1990, (Australia) 1994, (China) 2002, (Australia) 2022, (Japan) **2030**
**FIBA Europe**	8	(Soviet Union) 1959, (Czechoslovakia) 1967, (Soviet Union) 1986, (Germany) 1998, (Czech Republic) 2010, (Turkey) 2014, (Spain) 2018, (Germany) 2026

== Results ==
=== Summaries ===
Edition	Year	Hosts	Final			Third place game			Number of teams
Edition	Year	Hosts	Champion	Score	Runner-up	Third place	Score	Fourth place	Number of teams
1	1953; Details	Chile	**United States**	49–36	Chile	France	49–37	Brazil	10 (squads)
2	1957; Details	Brazil	**United States**	51–48	Soviet Union	Czechoslovakia	83–70	Brazil	12 (squads)
3	1959; Details	Soviet Union	**Soviet Union**	51–38	Bulgaria	Czechoslovakia	79–43	Yugoslavia	8 (squads)
4	1964; Details	Peru	**Soviet Union**	70–35	Czechoslovakia	Bulgaria	46–42	United States	13 (squads)
5	1967; Details	Czechoslovakia	**Soviet Union**	83–50	South Korea	Czechoslovakia	60–54	East Germany	11 (squads)
6	1971; Details	Brazil	**Soviet Union**	88–69	Czechoslovakia	Brazil	70–63	South Korea	13 (squads)
7	1975; Details	Colombia	**Soviet Union**	106–75	Japan	Czechoslovakia	55–45	Italy	13 (squads)
8	1979; Details	South Korea	**United States**	94–82	South Korea	Canada	66–57	Australia	12 (squads)
9	1983; Details	Brazil	**Soviet Union**	84–82	United States	China	71–63	South Korea	14 (squads)
10	1986; Details	Soviet Union	**United States**	108–88	Soviet Union	Canada	64–59	Czechoslovakia	12 (squads)
11	1990; Details	Malaysia	**United States**	88–78	Yugoslavia	Cuba	83–61	Czechoslovakia	16 (squads)
12	1994; Details	Australia	**Brazil**	96–87	China	United States	100–95	Australia	16 (squads)
13	1998; Details	Germany	**United States**	71–65	Russia	Australia	72–67	Brazil	16 (squads)
14	2002; Details	China	**United States**	79–74	Russia	Australia	91–63	South Korea	16 (squads)
15	2006; Details	Brazil	**Australia**	91–74	Russia	United States	99–59	Brazil	16 (squads)
16	2010; Details	Czech Republic	**United States**	89–69	Czech Republic	Spain	77–68	Belarus	16 (squads)
17	2014; Details	Turkey	**United States**	77–64	Spain	Australia	74–44	Turkey	16 (squads)
18	2018; Details	Spain	**United States**	73–56	Australia	Spain	67–60	Belgium	16 (squads)
19	2022; Details	Australia	**United States**	83–61	China	Australia	95–65	Canada	12 (squads)
20	2026; Details	Germany	**United States**	97–79	France	Spain	81–58	Germany	16
21	2030; Details	Japan	Future event TBA, Tokyo			Future event TBA, Tokyo			16

Note: From 1953 through 1979 the medalists were decided in a league format instead of in a knockout tournament; results of the final round matches are shown.

=== Medal table ===
Italics indicates nations that no longer exist.
Rank	Nation	Gold	Silver	Bronze	Total
1	United States	12	1	2	15
2	Soviet Union	6	2	0	8
3	Australia	1	1	4	6
4	Brazil	1	0	1	2
5	Russia	0	3	0	3
6	Czechoslovakia	0	2	4	6
7	China	0	2	1	3
8	South Korea	0	2	0	2
9	Spain	0	1	3	4
10	Bulgaria	0	1	1	2
10	France	0	1	1	2
12	Chile	0	1	0	1
12	Czech Republic	0	1	0	1
12	Japan	0	1	0	1
12	Yugoslavia	0	1	0	1
16	Canada	0	0	2	2
17	Cuba	0	0	1	1
Totals (17 entries)		**20**	**20**	**20**	**60**

=== Participating nations ===
Team	(Chile) 1953	(Brazil) 1957	(Soviet Union) 1959	(Peru) 1964	(Czechoslovakia) 1967	(Brazil) 1971	(Colombia) 1975	(South Korea) 1979	(Brazil) 1983	(Soviet Union) 1986	(Malaysia) 1990	(Australia) 1994	(Germany) 1998	(China) 2002	(Brazil) 2006	(Czech Republic) 2010	(Turkey) 2014	(Spain) 2018	(Australia) 2022	(Germany) 2026	(Japan) 2030	Total
Angola	–	–	–	–	–	–	–	–	–	–	–	–	–	–	–	–	16th	–	–	–		1
Argentina	6th	9th	–	13th	–	11th	–	–	–	–	–	–	15th	10th	9th	14th	–	15th	–	–		9
Australia	–	10th	–	–	10th	9th	10th	4th	11th	9th	6th	4th	3rd	3rd	1st	5th	3rd	2nd	3rd	6th		17
Belarus	–	–	–	–	–	–	–	–	–	–	–	–	–	–	–	4th	10th	–	–	–		2
Belgium	–	–	–	–	–	–	–	–	–	–	–	–	–	–	–	–	–	4th	5th	5th		3
Bolivia	–	–	–	–	–	–	–	10th	–	–	–	–	–	–	–	–	–	–	–	–		1
Bosnia and Herzegovina	–	–	–	–	–	–	–	–	–	–	–	–	–	–	–	–	–	–	12th	–		1
Brazil	4th	4th	–	5th	8th	3rd	12th	9th	5th	11th	10th	1st	4th	7th	4th	9th	11th	–	–	–		16
Bulgaria	–	–	2nd	3rd	7th	–	–	WD	6th	7th	8th	–	–	–	–	–	–	–	–	–		6
Canada	–	–	–	–	–	10th	11th	3rd	9th	3rd	7th	7th	–	–	10th	12th	5th	7th	4th	–		12
Chile	2nd	7th	–	11th	–	–	–	–	–	–	–	–	–	–	–	–	–	–	–	–		3
China	–	–	–	–	–	–	–	WD	3rd	5th	9th	2nd	12th	6th	12th	13th	6th	6th	2nd	7th		12
Chinese Taipei	–	–	–	–	–	–	–	–	–	12th	–	14th	–	14th	14th	–	–	–	–	–		4
Colombia	–	–	–	–	–	–	7th	–	–	–	–	–	–	–	–	–	–	–	–	–		1
DR Congo	–	–	–	–	–	–	–	–	14th	–	15th	–	16th	–	–	–	–	–	–	–		3
Cuba	10th	12th	–	–	–	7th	–	–	10th	6th	3rd	6th	7th	9th	11th	–	12th	–	–	–		9
Czech Republic	–	–	–	–	–	–	–	–	–	–	–	–	–	–	7th	2nd	9th	–	–	15th		4
Czechoslovakia †	–	3rd	3rd	2nd	3rd	2nd	3rd	WD	–	4th	4th	–	–	–	–	–	–	–	–	–	–	8
East Germany †	–	–	–	–	4th	–	–	–	–	–	–	–	–	–	–	–	–	–	–	–	–	1
Ecuador	–	–	–	–	–	12th	–	–	–	–	–	–	–	–	–	–	–	–	–	–		1
France	3rd	–	–	10th	–	6th	–	7th	–	–	–	9th	–	8th	5th	6th	7th	5th	7th	2nd		12
Germany	–	–	–	–	–	–	–	–	–	–	–	–	11th	–	–	–	–	–	–	4th		2
Greece	–	–	–	–	–	–	–	–	–	–	–	–	–	–	–	11th	–	11th	–	–		2
Hungary	–	5th	7th	–	–	–	9th	–	–	8th	–	–	10th	–	–	–	–	–	–	8th		6
Italy	–	–	–	–	9th	–	4th	5th	–	–	13th	11th	–	–	–	–	–	–	–	9th		6
Japan	–	–	–	9th	5th	5th	2nd	6th	12th	–	12th	12th	9th	13th	–	10th	14th	9th	9th	12th	Q	16
Kenya	–	–	–	–	–	–	–	–	–	–	–	16th	–	–	–	–	–	–	–	–		1
Latvia	–	–	–	–	–	–	–	–	–	–	–	–	–	–	–	–	–	13th	–	–		1
Lithuania	–	–	–	–	–	–	–	–	–	–	–	–	6th	11th	6th	–	–	–	–	–		3
Madagascar	–	–	–	–	–	13th	–	–	–	–	–	–	–	–	–	–	–	–	–	–		1
Malaysia	–	–	–	–	–	–	–	11th	–	–	16th	–	–	–	–	–	–	–	–	–		2
Mali	–	–	–	–	–	–	–	–	–	–	–	–	–	–	–	15th	–	–	11th	13th		3
Mexico	8th	8th	–	–	–	–	6th	WD	–	–	–	–	–	–	–	–	–	–	–	–		3
Mozambique	–	–	–	–	–	–	–	–	–	–	–	–	–	–	–	–	15th	–	–	–		1
Netherlands	–	–	–	–	–	–	–	8th	–	–	–	–	–	–	–	–	–	–	–	–		1
New Zealand	–	–	–	–	–	–	–	–	–	–	–	15th	–	–	–	–	–	–	–	–		1
Nigeria	–	–	–	–	–	–	–	–	–	–	–	–	–	–	16th	–	–	8th	WD	16th		3
Paraguay	5th	6th	–	12th	–	–	–	–	–	–	–	–	–	–	–	–	–	–	–	–		3
Peru	7th	11th	–	7th	–	–	–	–	13th	–	–	–	–	–	–	–	–	–	–	–		4
Poland	–	–	5th	–	–	–	–	–	7th	–	–	13th	–	–	–	–	–	–	–	–		3
Puerto Rico	–	–	–	–	–	–	–	–	–	–	–	–	–	–	–	–	–	16th	8th	11th		3
Romania	–	–	6th	–	–	–	–	–	–	–	–	–	–	–	–	–	–	–	–	–		1
Russia	–	–	–	–	–	–	–	–	–	–	–	–	2nd	2nd	2nd	7th	–	–	DQ	DQ		4
Senegal	–	–	–	–	–	–	13th	12th	WD	–	14th	WD	14th	15th	15th	16th	–	12th	–	–		8
Serbia	–	–	–	–	–	–	–	–	–	–	–	–	–	–	–	–	8th	–	6th	–		2
Slovakia	–	–	–	–	–	–	–	–	–	–	–	5th	8th	–	–	–	–	–	–	–		2
South Korea	–	–	8th	8th	2nd	4th	5th	2nd	4th	10th	11th	10th	13th	4th	13th	8th	13th	14th	10th	10th		18
Soviet Union †	–	2nd	1st	1st	1st	1st	1st	WD	1st	2nd	5th	–	–	–	–	–	–	–	–	–	–	9
Spain	–	–	–	–	–	–	–	–	–	–	–	8th	5th	5th	8th	3rd	2nd	3rd	–	3rd		8
Switzerland	9th	–	–	–	–	–	–	–	–	–	–	–	–	–	–	–	–	–	–	–		1
Tunisia	–	–	–	–	–	–	–	–	–	–	–	–	–	16th	–	–	–	–	–	–		1
Turkey	–	–	–	–	–	–	–	–	–	–	–	–	–	–	–	–	4th	10th	–	14th		3
United States	1st	1st	–	4th	11th	8th	8th	1st	2nd	1st	1st	3rd	1st	1st	3rd	1st	1st	1st	1st	1st		19
Yugoslavia †	–	–	4th	6th	6th	–	–	WD	8th	–	2nd	–	–	12th	–	–	–	–	–	–	–	6
Total	10	12	8	13	11	13	13	12	14	12	16	16	16	16	16	16	16	16	12	16	16	

== Most successful players ==
Boldface denotes active basketball players and highest medal count among all players (including these who not included in these tables) per type.

=== Multiple gold medalists ===
Rank	Player	Country	From	To	Gold	Silver	Bronze	Total
1	Sue Bird	United States	2002	2018	**4**	–	1	**5**
2	**Breanna Stewart**	United States	2014	2026	**4**	–	–	4
3	Raisa Mikhaylova (Kuznetsova)	Soviet Union	1957	1967	3	1	–	4
3	Nina Poznanskaya	Soviet Union	1957	1967	3	1	–	4
5	Diana Taurasi	United States	2006	2018	3	–	1	4
6	Tina Charles	United States	2010	2018	3	–	–	3
6	Uļjana (Iulijaka) Semjonova	Soviet Union	1971	1983	3	–	–	3
6	Skaidrīte Smildziņa	Soviet Union	1959	1967	3	–	–	3
9	Jennifer Azzi	United States	1990	1998	2	–	1	3
9	Tamika Catchings	United States	2002	2010	2	–	1	3
9	Teresa Edwards	United States	1986	1994	2	–	1	3
9	Lisa Leslie	United States	1994	2002	2	–	1	3
9	Katrina McClain	United States	1986	1994	2	–	1	3
9	DeLisha Milton-Jones	United States	1998	2006	2	–	1	3
9	Katie Smith	United States	1998	2006	2	–	1	3
9	Dawn Staley	United States	1994	2002	2	–	1	3

=== Multiple medalists ===
The table shows players who have won at least 4 medals in total at the World Cups.

Rank	Player	Country	From	To	Gold	Silver	Bronze	Total
1	Sue Bird	United States	2002	2018	**4**	–	1	**5**
2	**Breanna Stewart**	United States	2014	2026	**4**	–	–	4
3	Raisa Mikhaylova (Kuznetsova)	Soviet Union	1957	1967	3	1	–	4
3	Nina Poznanskaya	Soviet Union	1957	1967	3	1	–	4
5	Diana Taurasi	United States	2006	2018	3	–	1	4
6	Lauren Jackson	Australia	1998	2022	1	–	**3**	4
7	Milena Jindrová	Czechoslovakia	1964	1975	–	**2**	2	4
8	**Alba Torrens**	Spain	2010	2026	–	1	**3**	4

== See also ==
- FIBA Basketball World Cup (formerly FIBA World Championship)
