= Hong Kong women's national basketball team =

Hong Kong
- FIBA ranking: 107 ▼2 (14 September 2026)
- Joined FIBA: 1957
- FIBA zone: FIBA Asia
- National federation: Basketball Association of Hong Kong, China (BAHKC)
- Coach: Kin-Ho Koon

Asia Cup
- Appearances: 22
- Medals: None

Asian Games
- Appearances: 4
- Medals: None
Home	Away

First international
- Formosa 76–49 Hong Kong (Taipei, Republic of China; 22 July 1968)

Biggest win
- Hong Kong 104–28 Nepal (Hwaseong, South Korea; 26 September 2014)

Biggest defeat
- South Korea 165–47 Hong Kong (Sendai, Japan; 25 April 1994)

The Hong Kong women's national basketball team (Chinese: 香港女子籃球隊; recognised as Hong Kong, China by FIBA) represents Hong Kong in international women's basketball, and is controlled by the Basketball Association of Hong Kong, China (BAHKC).

== Competitive record ==
=== Asian Games ===
- 2014: 9th place
- 2018: 10th place
- 2022: 9th place
- 2026: 10th place

== See also ==
- Hong Kong women's national under-18 basketball team
- Hong Kong women's national under-16 basketball team
- Hong Kong women's national 3x3 team
