= Japan women's national basketball team =

Women's national basketball team representing Japan

Japan
- FIBA ranking: 9 ▲1 (14 September 2026)
- FIBA zone: FIBA Asia
- National federation: JBA
- Coach: Corey Gaines
- Nickname: アカツキジャパン (Akatsuki Japan)

Olympic Games
- Appearances: 6
- Medals: (silver) Silver: (2020)

World Cup
- Appearances: 15
- Medals: (silver) Silver: (1975)

Asia Cup
- Appearances: 30
- Medals: (gold) Gold: (1970, 2013, 2015, 2017, 2019, 2021); (silver) Silver: (1965, 1968, 1974, 1997, 1999, 2001, 2004, 2023, 2025); (bronze) Bronze: (1976, 1978, 1980, 1982, 1984, 1990, 1992, 1994, 1995, 2007, 2009, 2011)
Home	Away

The Japan women's national basketball team, also known as Akatsuki Japan (Japanese: アカツキジャパン), is the national team representing Japan in international basketball competitions. It is administered by the Japan Basketball Association.

At the 2020 Summer Olympics, Japan won the silver medal, the nation's first Olympic basketball medal (for men or women) and became the first Asian team to reach the podium in women's basketball since China in 1992. The Japanese, which were coached by Tom Hovasse, excelled in an 87–71 win over France in the semi-finals before coming short 75–90 against the United States. Japan's Rui Machida set an Olympic record with 18 assists against France.

== Competitive record ==
=== Olympic Games ===
- 1976 – 5th place
- 1996 – 7th place
- 2004 – 10th place
- 2016 – 8th place
- 2020 – 2nd place
- 2024 – 12th place

=== FIBA World Cup ===
- 1964 – 9th place
- 1967 – 5th place
- 1971 – 5th place
- 1975 – 2nd place
- 1979 – 6th place
- 2010 – 10th place
- 2014 – 14th place
- 2018 – 9th place
- 2022 – 9th place
- 2026 – 12th place
- 2030 – Qualified as hosts

=== FIBA Women's Asia Cup ===
- Gold: (1970, 2013, 2015, 2017, 2019, 2021)
- Silver: (1965, 1968, 1974, 1997, 1999, 2001, 2004, 2023, 2025)
- Bronze: (1976, 1978, 1980, 1982, 1984, 1990, 1992, 1994, 1995, 2007, 2009, 2011)

=== Asian Games ===
- Gold: (1974, 1998)
- Silver: (1994, 2022, 2026)
- Bronze: (1978, 1982, 1986, 2006, 2010, 2014, 2018)

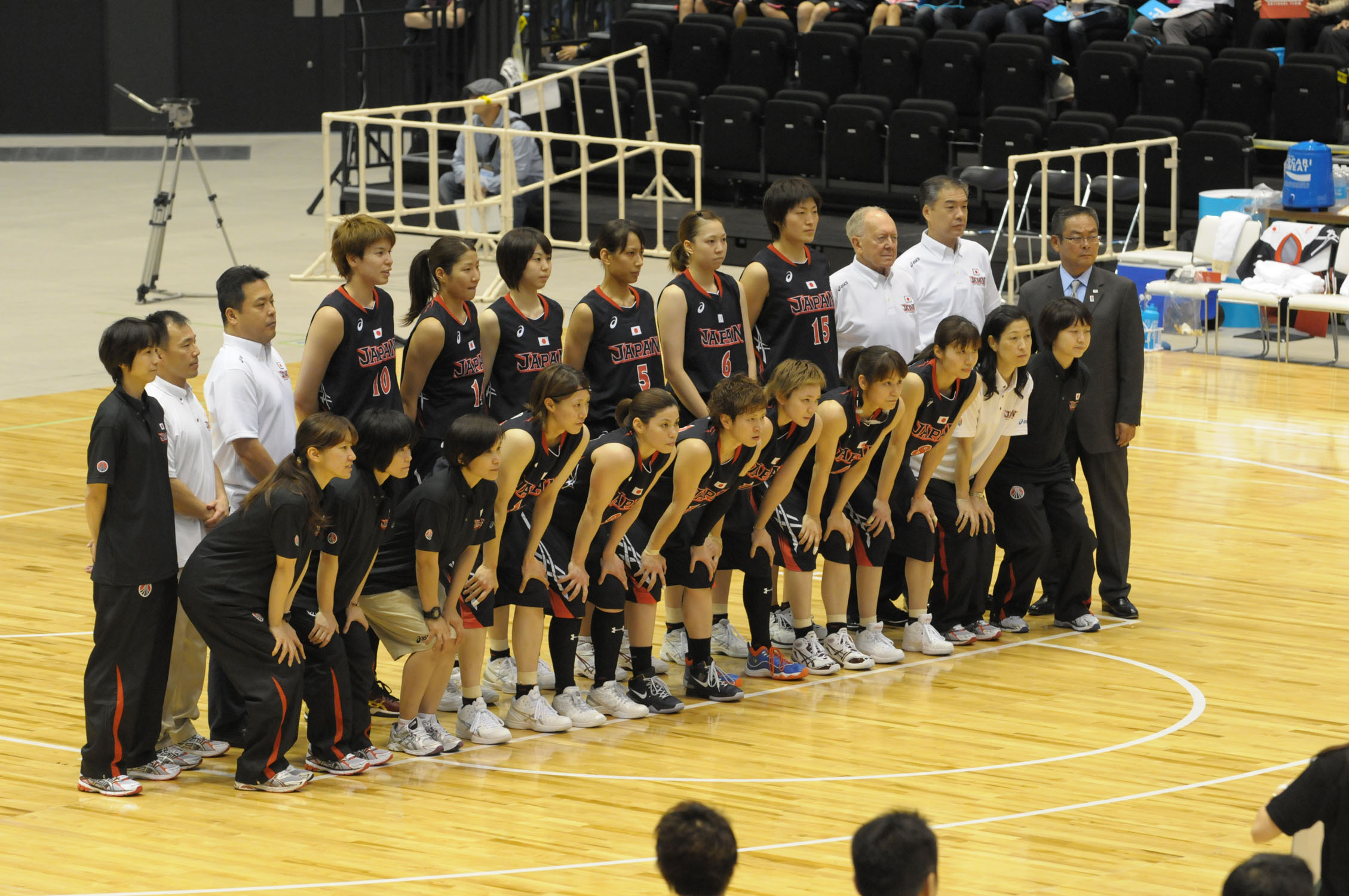
The women's national basketball team of Japan in 2013

== Team ==
=== Current roster ===
Roster for the 2026 FIBA Women's Basketball World Cup.

Japan women's national basketball team roster
Players
Coaches

Pos.	No.	Name	Age – Date of birth	Height	Club	Ctr.
SG	2	Norika Konno	26 – 1 May 2000	1.79 m (5 ft 10 in)	Eneos Sunflowers	(Japan)
PF	3	Stephanie Mawuli	27 – 25 November 1998	1.82 m (6 ft 0 in)	CB Avenida	(Spain)
SF	6	Otoha Goto	19 – 13 February 2007	1.78 m (5 ft 10 in)	Tokyo Healthcare University	(Japan)
C	8	Maki Takada	37 – 23 August 1989	1.85 m (6 ft 1 in)	Denso Iris	(Japan)
C	10	Ramu Tokashiki	35 – 11 June 1991	1.93 m (6 ft 4 in)	Toyota Antelopes	(Japan)
PG	13	Rui Machida	33 – 8 March 1993	1.62 m (5 ft 4 in)	Fujitsu Red Wave	(Japan)
C	14	Azusa Asahina	22 – 20 October 2003	1.85 m (6 ft 1 in)	Toyota Boshoku Sunshine Rabbits	(Japan)
PG	23	Mai Yamamoto	26 – 23 October 1999	1.63 m (5 ft 4 in)	Las Vegas Aces	(United States)
PG	26	Kokoro Tanaka	20 – 10 January 2006	1.73 m (5 ft 8 in)	Eneos Sunflowers	(Japan)
SG	27	Saki Hayashi	31 – 16 March 1995	1.73 m (5 ft 8 in)	Fujitsu Red Wave	(Japan)
PF	52	Yuki Miyazawa (C)	33 – 2 June 1993	1.83 m (6 ft 0 in)	Fujitsu Red Wave	(Japan)
SG	75	Nanako Todo	25 – 29 November 2000	1.75 m (5 ft 9 in)	Toyota Boshoku Sunshine Rabbits	(Japan)

Head coach

- (United States) Corey Gaines

Assistant coach(es)

- (Japan) Tomoki Miyata

Legend

- (C) Team captain
- Club – describes last
  club before the tournament
- Age – describes age
  on 4 September 2026

=== Coaches ===
- Masayuki Katsura
- Masatoshi Ozaki
- Masami Komori
- Zhang Tixin
- Kazuo Nakamura
- Takeshi Ishikawa
- Hideo Enomoto
- Fumikazu Nakagawa
- Norihiko Kitahara
- Tomohide Utsumi
- Junichi Ara
- Tom Hovasse
- Toru Onzuka
- Corey Gaines

== See also ==
- Japan women's national under-19 basketball team
- Japan women's national under-17 basketball team
- Japan women's national 3x3 team
