= South Korea women's national basketball team =

Women's national basketball team representing South Korea

South Korea
- FIBA ranking: 14 ▲1 (14 September 2026)
- Joined FIBA: 1955
- FIBA zone: FIBA Asia
- National federation: KBA
- Coach: Park Soo-ho

Olympic Games
- Appearances: 7
- Medals: (silver) Silver: (1984)

World Cup
- Appearances: 18
- Medals: (silver) Silver: (1967, 1979)

Asia Cup
- Appearances: 31
- Medals: (gold) Gold: (1965, 1968, 1972, 1974, 1978, 1980, 1982, 1984, 1988, 1997, 1999, 2007); (silver) Silver: (1970, 1976, 1986, 1990, 1992, 1994, 1995, 2005, 2009, 2011; (bronze) Bronze: (2001, 2004, 2015)

Asian Games
- Appearances: 11
- Medals: (gold) Gold: (1978, 1990, 1994, 2014); (silver) Silver: (1974, 1982, 1986, 2002, 2010); (bronze) Bronze: (1998)
Home	Away

The South Korea women's national basketball team (Korean: 대한민국 여자농구 국가대표팀; recognized as Korea by FIBA) represents South Korea in international women's basketball competitions. They are administered by the Korea Basketball Association.

== History ==
Team South Korea’s greatest success was at the 1984 Los Angeles Summer Games, when they took silver.

They finished fourth at the 2000 Summer Olympics and eighth at the 2008 Beijing Games.

In February 2020, South Korea qualified for the 2020 Summer Olympics through beating Great Britain during the FIBA Qualifying Tournament in Belgrade, Serbia. It is South Korea's first appearance at the tournament since 2008 Olympics in Beijing.

South Korea will play in group A alongside world No. 3 Spain, No. 4 Canada and No. 8 Serbia. The Koreans will look for at least one win in group A as the top two countries of each group advance to the quarterfinals.

== Competitive record ==
=== Olympic Games ===
Summer Olympics
Year	Position	Pld	W	L
(Canada) 1976	did not qualify			
(Soviet Union) 1980	did not qualify			
(United States) 1984	Runners-up	6	4	2
(South Korea) 1988	7th Place	5	2	3
(Spain) 1992	did not qualify			
(United States) 1996	12th Place	7	3	4
(Australia) 2000	Fourth Place	8	4	4
(Greece) 2004	12th Place	6	0	6
(China) 2008	8th Place	6	2	4
(United Kingdom) 2012	did not qualify			
(Brazil) 2016	did not qualify			
(Japan) 2020	10th Place	3	0	3
(France) 2024	did not qualify			
(United States) 2028	to be determined			
Total	7/14	41	15	26

=== FIBA World Cup ===
FIBA Women's World Cup
Year	Position	Pld	W	L
(Chile) 1953	Did not enter			
(Brazil) 1957	Did not enter			
(Soviet Union) 1959	8th Place	7	0	7
(Peru) 1964	8th Place	8	6	2
(Czechoslovakia) 1967	Runners-up	6	5	1
(Brazil) 1971	Fourth Place	9	6	3
(Colombia) 1975	5th Place	8	4	4
(South Korea) 1979	Runners-up	8	7	1
(Brazil) 1983	Fourth Place	10	5	5
(Soviet Union) 1986	10th Place	7	2	5
(Malaysia) 1990	11th Place	8	5	3
(Australia) 1994	10th Place	8	4	4
(Germany) 1998	13th Place	5	2	3
(China) 2002	Fourth Place	9	4	5
(Brazil) 2006	13th Place	5	2	3
(Czech Republic) 2010	8th Place	9	3	6
(Turkey) 2014	13th Place	3	0	3
(Spain) 2018	14th Place	3	0	3
(Australia) 2022	10th Place	5	1	4
(Germany) 2026	10th place	4	1	3
(Japan) 2030	To be determined			
Total	18/21	122	57	65

=== Asian Games ===
Asian Games
Year	Position	Pld	W	L
(Iran) 1974	Runners-up	4	3	1
(Thailand) 1978	Champions	4	4	0
(India) 1982	Runners-up	4	3	1
(South Korea) 1986	Runners-up	3	2	1
(China) 1990	Champions	6	5	1
(Japan) 1994	Champions	6	5	1
(Thailand) 1998	Third Place	5	4	1
(South Korea) 2002	Runners-up	7	5	2
(Qatar) 2006	Fourth Place	4	1	3
(China) 2010	Runners-up	5	3	2
(South Korea) 2014	Champions	3	3	0
(Indonesia) 2018	Entered as Korea			
(China) 2022	Third Place	6	5	1
(Japan) 2026	To be determined			
Total	12/12	49	36	14

=== FIBA Women's Asia Cup ===
FIBA Women's Asia Cup
Year	Position	Pld	W	L
(South Korea) 1965	Champions	8	8	0
(Taiwan) 1968	Champions	7	7	0
(Malaysia) 1970	Runners-up	9	8	1
(Taiwan) 1972	Champions	6	6	0
(South Korea) 1974	Champions	6	6	0
(Hong Kong) 1976	Runners-up	6	5	1
(Malaysia) 1978	Champions	8	8	0
(Hong Kong) 1980	Champions	6	6	0
(Japan) 1982	Champions	6	6	0
(China) 1984	Champions	8	7	1
(Malaysia) 1986	Runners-up	7	6	1
(Hong Kong) 1988	Champions	8	8	0
(Singapore) 1990	Runners-up	4	3	1
(South Korea) 1992	Runners-up	7	5	2
(Japan) 1994	Runners-up	5	3	2
(Japan) 1995	Runners-up	6	4	2
(Thailand) 1997	Champions	7	7	0
(Japan) 1999	Champions	6	5	1
(Thailand) 2001	Third Place	6	3	3
(Japan) 2004	Third Place	6	5	1
(China) 2005	Runners-up	6	5	1
(South Korea) 2007	Champions	7	7	0
(India) 2009	Runners-up	7	5	2
(Japan) 2011	Runners-up	7	6	1
(Thailand) 2013	Runners-up	7	4	3
(China) 2015	Third Place	7	4	3
(India) 2017	Fourth Place	6	2	4
(India) 2019	Fourth Place	6	3	3
(Jordan) 2021	Fourth Place	6	3	3
(Australia) 2023	Fifth Place	5	2	3
(China) 2025	Fourth Place	6	3	3
(Philippines) 2027	Qualified			
Total	32/32	202	160	42

== Current roster ==
Roster for the 2026 FIBA Women's Basketball World Cup.

South Korea women's national basketball team roster
Players
Coaches

Pos.	No.	Name	Age – Date of birth	Height	Club	Ctr.
F	1	Park Ji-hyun	26 – 7 April 2000	1.85 m (6 ft 1 in)	Los Angeles Sparks	(United States)
G	2	Heo Ye-eun	25 – 24 July 2001	1.67 m (5 ft 6 in)	Cheongju KB Stars	(South Korea)
F	3	Kang Lee-seul (C)	32 – 5 April 1994	1.80 m (5 ft 11 in)	Asan Woori Bank Woori Won	(South Korea)
PG	5	An He-ji	29 – 12 February 1997	1.64 m (5 ft 5 in)	Busan BNK Sum	(South Korea)
PF	6	Choi I-saem	32 – 17 August 1994	1.83 m (6 ft 0 in)	Busan BNK Sum	(South Korea)
F	8	Jeong Hyun	20 – 13 August 2006	1.80 m (5 ft 11 in)	Bucheon Hana Bank	(South Korea)
G	9	Lee So-hee	26 – 7 August 2000	1.71 m (5 ft 7 in)	Busan BNK Sum	(South Korea)
F	10	Kang Yoo-lim	29 – 23 March 1997	1.75 m (5 ft 9 in)	Samsung Life Blueminx	(South Korea)
G	11	Park So-hee	23 – 15 May 2003	1.78 m (5 ft 10 in)	Bucheon Hana Bank	(South Korea)
F	12	Lee Hae-ran	23 – 29 May 2003	1.82 m (6 ft 0 in)	Samsung Life Blueminx	(South Korea)
PF	39	Hong Yu-sun	21 – 23 February 2005	1.79 m (5 ft 10 in)	Incheon Shinhan	(South Korea)
C	77	Jin An	30 – 23 March 1996	1.82 m (6 ft 0 in)	Bucheon Hana Bank	(South Korea)

Head coach

- (South Korea) Park Soo-ho

Assistant coach(es)

- (South Korea) Yang Ji-hee

Legend

- (C) Team captain
- Club – describes last
  club before the tournament
- Age – describes age
  on 4 September 2026

== See also ==
- South Korea women's national under-19 basketball team
- South Korea women's national under-17 basketball team
- South Korea women's national 3x3 team
