= China women's national basketball team =

Women's national basketball team representing China

China
- FIBA ranking: 4 (18 March 2026)
- Joined FIBA: 1974
- FIBA zone: FIBA Asia
- National federation: CBA
- Coach: Gong Luming

Olympic Games
- Appearances: 10
- Medals: (silver) Silver: (1992); (bronze) Bronze (1984)

World Cup
- Appearances: 12
- Medals: (silver) Silver: (1994, 2022); (bronze) Bronze: (1983)

Asia Cup
- Appearances: 26
- Medals: (gold) Gold: (1976, 1986, 1990, 1992, 1994, 1995, 2001, 2004, 2005, 2009, 2011, 2023); (silver) Silver: (1978, 1980, 1982, 1984, 1988, 2007, 2015, 2019, 2021); (bronze) Bronze: (1997, 2013, 2017, 2025)
Home	Away

The China women's national basketball team represents the People's Republic of China in international women's basketball tournaments. The national team is governed by the Chinese Basketball Association (CBA).

== History ==
Basketball was first introduced in China by YMCA missionaries by the second half of the 1890s, remaining popular in urban areas during the Republican period. With the creation of the People's Republic of China, the sport retained its popularity, being introduced in PE in schools.

The first color movie in China about sports was Xie Jin's Woman Basketball Player No. 5, from 1957. By the 1970s, basketball was, alongside volleyball, one of the most popular women's sport in the country.

China stayed out of international competitions since 1958, when the International Olympic Committee chose Taiwan as the representative of the country.

After the People's Republic of China became the representative of China in international competitions, the basketball team won several accolades, including several golds in the Asian Games and the Asia Cup, a third place in the 1984 Summer Olympics, and a third place in the 1983 Women's World Cup.

For the first time since 1994, China got a medal in the 2022 Women's World Cup after being defeated by Team USA in the finals.

== Tournament record ==
=== Olympic Games ===
- 1984 – 3rd place
- 1988 – 6th place
- 1992 – 2nd place
- 1996 – 9th place
- 2004 – 9th place
- 2008 – 4th place
- 2012 – 6th place
- 2016 – 10th place
- 2020 – 5th place
- 2024 – 9th place

=== World Cup ===
- 1983 – 3rd place
- 1986 – 5th place
- 1990 – 9th place
- 1994 – 2nd place
- 1998 – 12th place
- 2002 – 6th place
- 2006 – 12th place
- 2010 – 13th place
- 2014 – 6th place
- 2018 – 6th place
- 2022 – 2nd place
- 2026 – 7th place

=== Women's Asia Cup ===
- Gold: 1976, 1986, 1990, 1992, 1994, 1995, 2001, 2004, 2005, 2009, 2011, 2023
- Silver: 1978, 1980, 1982, 1984, 1988, 1990, 2007, 2015, 2019, 2021
- Bronze: 1997, 2013, 2017, 2025

=== Asian Games ===
- Gold; 1982, 1986, 2002, 2006, 2010, 2018, 2022
- Silver; 1978, 1990, 1998, 2014
- Bronze; 1974, 1994

== Current roster ==
Roster for the 2026 FIBA Women's Basketball World Cup.

China women's national basketball team roster
Players
Coaches

Pos.	No.	Name	Age – Date of birth	Height	Club	Ctr.
G	1	Zhang Manman	29 – 8 January 1997	1.70 m (5 ft 7 in)	Jiangsu Phoenix	(China)
G	4	Li Yuan	26 – 29 May 2000	1.70 m (5 ft 7 in)	Inner Mongolia Nongxin	(China)
G	5	Wang Siyu	30 – 16 October 1995	1.80 m (5 ft 11 in)	Sichuan Yuanda Meile	(China)
G	6	Yang Shuyu	24 – 6 March 2002	1.83 m (6 ft 0 in)	Melbourne Tigers	(Australia)
PF	9	Tang Ziting	26 – 14 June 2000	1.90 m (6 ft 3 in)	Sichuan Yuanda Meile	(China)
F	11	Luo Xinyu	24 – 22 November 2001	1.88 m (6 ft 2 in)	Jiangsu Phoenix	(China)
SG	12	Chen Yujie (C)	26 – 23 June 2000	1.78 m (5 ft 10 in)	Sichuan Yuanda Meile	(China)
C	15	Han Xu	26 – 31 October 1999	2.11 m (6 ft 11 in)	New York Liberty	(United States)
C	18	Chen Mingling	26 – 25 July 2000	1.92 m (6 ft 4 in)	Guangdong Vermilion Birds	(China)
C	19	Zhang Ziyu	19 – 2 May 2007	2.23 m (7 ft 4 in)	Shandong Six Stars	(China)
SG	20	Sun Yu	22 – 11 February 2004	1.83 m (6 ft 0 in)	Jiangsu Phoenix	(China)
F	31	Jia Saiqi	27 – 30 December 1998	1.85 m (6 ft 1 in)	Sichuan Yuanda Meile	(China)

Head coach

- (China) Gong Luming

Assistant coach(es)

- (France) Pierre Vincent
- (China) Wang Ling
- (China) Thang Yong

Legend

- (C) Team captain
- Club – describes last
  club before the tournament
- Age – describes age
  on 4 September 2026

== See also ==
- China national basketball team
- China women's national under-19 basketball team
- China women's national under-17 basketball team
