= Arab Basketball Confederation =

International sports governing body

- Founded: 1956
- Affiliation: FIBA
- Regional affiliation: FIBA Africa; FIBA Asia
- Headquarters: Cairo, Egypt

Official website
- arab.basketball

The Arab Basketball Confederation (Arabic: الاتحاد العربي لكرة السلة) or simply ABC is a basketball association for countries in the Arab world. It organises the Arab Basketball Championship for national teams in the men and women categories, as well as club championships.

== History ==
It was founded in 1956 with nine founding members: Lebanon, Tunisia, Syria, Jordan, Iraq, Tunisia, Libya, Sudan, Algeria and Egypt. The first president was Azer Ishak from Egypt and the headquarters were agreed to be Beirut in Lebanon. In 1975, the first Arab Basketball Championship for national teams was organised in Baghdad.

== Presidents ==
Period	Name
1965–1974	(Egypt) Azer Ishak
1974–1977	Tony Khory
1977–1991	(Iraq) Akram Nagy
1991–2002	(Egypt) Mohamed Hassanein Omran
2003–2015	Telal Ben Badr Seaod
2015–present	(United Arab Emirates) Ismail Elkarakawy

== Member associations ==
All Arab Basketball Confederation (ABC) members are drawn from Arab countries across Africa and Asia.

Country	Continental Confederation	Regional Sub‑confederation	Year
United Arab Emirates	FIBA Asia	West Asia	1974
Jordan	FIBA Asia	West Asia	1974
Bahrain	FIBA Asia	West Asia	1976
Djibouti	FIBA Africa	CECAFA	1998
Saudi Arabia	FIBA Asia	West Asia	1974
Sudan	FIBA Africa	CECAFA	1978
Syria	FIBA Asia	West Asia	1974
Somalia	FIBA Africa	CECAFA	1974
Iraq	FIBA Asia	West Asia	1974
Oman	FIBA Asia	West Asia	1978
Palestine	FIBA Asia	West Asia	1974
Qatar	FIBA Asia	West Asia	1976
Kuwait	FIBA Asia	West Asia	1976
Lebanon	FIBA Asia	West Asia	1978
Libya	FIBA Africa	UNAF	1974
Egypt	FIBA Africa	UNAF	1974
Yemen	FIBA Asia	West Asia	1978
Algeria	FIBA Africa	UNAF	1974
Tunisia	FIBA Africa	UNAF	1976
Morocco	FIBA Africa	UNAF	1976
Mauritania	FIBA Africa	UNAF	1989
Comoros	FIBA Africa	COSAFA	2003

== Competitions ==
Men's senior

- Arab Basketball Championship
- Arab 3x3 Basketball Championship
- Basketball at the Arab Games
- 3x3 basketball at the Arab Games

Men's youth

- Arab U18 Basketball Championship
- Arab U18 3x3 Basketball Championship

Women's senior and youth

- Arab Women's Basketball Championship
- Arab Women's U18 Basketball Championship
- Arab Women's 3x3 Basketball Championship
- Arab Women's U18 3x3 Basketball Championship
- Basketball at the Arab Games Women's
- 3x3 basketball at the Arab Games Women's

Clubs

- Arab Club Basketball Championship
- Arab Women's Club Basketball Championship

=== Current title holders ===
Competition	Edition	Champions	Title	Runners-up	Next edition	Dates
National teams (Men)
Arab Basketball Championship	2025	Algeria	2nd	Tunisia	TBD	TBD
Arab 3x3 Basketball Championship	2024	Egypt	1st	Jordan	TBD	TBD
Basketball at the Arab Games	2023	Lebanon	2nd	Qatar	TBD	TBD
3x3 basketball at the Arab Games	2023	Saudi Arabia	1st	United Arab Emirates	TBD	TBD
Arab U18 Basketball Championship	2025	Bahrain	1st	Algeria	TBD	TBD
Arab U18 3x3 Basketball Championship	2025	Qatar	1st	Kuwait	TBD	TBD
National teams (Women)
Arab Women's Basketball Championship	2025	Egypt	6th	Tunisia	TBD	TBD
Arab Women's 3x3 Basketball Championship	2024	Jordan	1st	Egypt	TBD	TBD
Basketball at the Arab Games Women's	2023	Morocco	2nd	Algeria	TBD	TBD
3x3 basketball at the Arab Games Women's	2023	Egypt	1st	Tunisia	TBD	TBD
Arab Women's U18 Basketball Championship	2024	Lebanon	3rd	Jordan	TBD	TBD
Arab Women's U18 3x3 Basketball Championship	2025	Qatar	1st	Kuwait	TBD	TBD
Club teams (Men)
Arab Club Basketball Championship	2025	Lebanon Sagesse	3rd	Kuwait Al-Kuwait SC	TBD	TBD
Club teams (Women)
Arab Women's Club Basketball Championship	2025	Jordan Shabab Al-Fuheis	1st	Algeria GS Kocidar	TBD	TBD

== FIBA World Rankings ==
=== Men's national teams ===
Rankings are calculated by FIBA.

ABC	FIBA	Country	Points	+/−	Confederation
1	28	Lebanon	404.9	▲ +2	FIBA Asia
2	38	Jordan	337.0	0	FIBA Asia
3	44	Egypt	296.8	▼ −2	FIBA Africa
4	49	Tunisia	278.2	▲ +1	FIBA Africa
5	63	Saudi Arabia	198.5	▲ +1	FIBA Asia
6	72	Syria	152.9	▲ +2	FIBA Asia
7	73	Bahrain	151.3	▼ −3	FIBA Asia
8	78	Qatar	134.4	▲ +5	FIBA Asia
9	85	Iraq	122.3	▲ +4	FIBA Asia
10	91	Libya	112.5	▲ +5	FIBA Africa
11	98	Palestine	90.9	0	FIBA Asia
12	105	United Arab Emirates	83.4	▼ −1	FIBA Asia
13	109	Kuwait	74.4	0	FIBA Asia
14	116	Morocco	72.1	0	FIBA Africa
15	121	Algeria	69.5	0	FIBA Africa
16	135	Somalia	55.8	0	FIBA Africa
17	146	Oman	43.1	0	FIBA Asia
18	160	Comoros	–	–	FIBA Africa

Last updated 6 January 2026

=== Women's national teams ===
Rankings are calculated by FIBA.

ABC	FIBA	Country	Points	+/−	Confederation
1	66	Morocco	1399.536	▼2	FIBA Africa
2	44	Egypt	152.3	0	FIBA Africa
3	38	Lebanon	187.6	▲1	FIBA Asia
4	49	Tunisia	141.2	0	FIBA Africa
5	72	Jordan	118.7	▲2	FIBA Asia

Last updated 6 January 2026

== International competitions participation ==
Legend

- — FIBA Asia teams
- — FIBA Africa teams
- 1st — Champions
- 2nd — Runners-up
- 3rd — Third place
- 4th — Fourth place
- SF – Semi-final (no third place match)
- QF — Quarterfinals
- R2 — Round 2
- R1 — Round 1
- Q — Qualified for upcoming tournament
- •• — Qualified but withdrew
- • — Did not qualify
- × — Did not enter / Withdrew / Banned / Entry not accepted by FIBA
- — Hosts
- — Not affiliated to FIBA

=== FIBA Basketball World Cup ===
Team	1950 (Argentina)	1954 (Brazil)	1959 (Chile)	1963 (Brazil)	1967 (Uruguay)	1970 (Socialist Federal Republic of Yugoslavia)	1974 (Puerto Rico)	1978 (Philippines)	1982 (Colombia)	1986 (Spain)	1990 (Argentina)	1994 (Canada)	1998 (Greece)	2002 (United States)	2006 (Japan)	2010 (Turkey)	2014 (Spain)	2019 (China)	2023 (Philippines) (Japan) (Indonesia)	2027 (Qatar)	Total
Algeria	Part of France													R1; 15th	•	•	•	×	×		1
Egypt; United Arab Republic 1959, 1970	R2; 5th		R1; 11th			R1; 13th					R1; 16th	R1; 14th		•	×	•	R1; 24th	•	R1; 20th		7
Jordan														•	•	R1; 23rd	•	R1; 28th	R1; 32nd		3
Lebanon														R1; 16th	R1; 17th	R1; 20th	•	•	R1; 23rd		4
Qatar														•	R1; 21st	•	•	•	×	Q	2
Tunisia														•	•	R1; 24th	•	R1; 20th	•		2
Total	1	0	1	0	0	1	0	0	0	0	1	1	0	2	2	3	1	2	3	TBD	

Notes:

- Teams that failed to qualify to the semifinal round at the 1986 championship were ranked tied for 13th.
- In 2006, when the tournament expanded to 24 teams (four preliminary round groups of six teams each), teams that finished 5th in their preliminary round groups were ranked tied for 17th, while teams that finished 6th in their preliminary round groups were ranked tied for 21st. Teams eliminated in round of 16 were ranked tied for 9th.

=== Olympic Basketball Tournament ===
Nation	1936 (Nazi Germany)	1948 (United Kingdom)	1952 (Finland)	1956 (Australia)	1960 (Italy)	1964 (Japan)	1968 (Mexico)	1972 (West Germany)	1976 (Canada)	1980 (Soviet Union)	1984 (United States)	1988 (South Korea)	1992 (Spain)	1996 (United States)	2000 (Australia)	2004 (Greece)	2008 (China)	2012 (United Kingdom)	2016 (Brazil)	2020 (Japan)	2024 (France)	Appearances
Egypt	15th	19th	9th					16th	12th		12th	12th										7
Iraq		22nd																				1
Morocco	^{A}						16th															1
Tunisia																		11th				1
Nations	1	2	1	0	0	0	1	1	1	0	1	1	0	0	0	0	0	1	0	0	0	

==== Notes ====
^{^A} The NOC was not member of the IOC.

-

=== Participating teams ===
Nation	(Greece) 2012	(Russia) 2014	(China) 2016	(France) 2017	(Philippines) 2018	(Netherlands) 2019	(Belgium) 2022	(Austria) 2023	(Mongolia) 2025	(Poland) 2026	(Singapore) 2027	Total
Egypt	14th	–	16th	18th	–	–	18th	–	–			4
Jordan	–	–	–	–	19th	–	–	–	–			1
Lebanon	21st	–	–	–	–	–	–	–				1
Qatar	–	1st	5th	6th	–	12th	–	–	–			4
Tunisia	–	11th	–	–	–	–	–	–	–			1
Total	2	2	2	2	1	1	1	0	0	TBD	TBD	

== Comprehensive team results ==
Team	(Chile) 1953	(Brazil) 1957	(Soviet Union) 1959	(Peru) 1964	(Czechoslovakia) 1967	(Brazil) 1971	(Colombia) 1975	(South Korea) 1979	(Brazil) 1983	(Soviet Union) 1986	(Malaysia) 1990	(Australia) 1994	(Germany) 1998	(China) 2002	(Brazil) 2006	(Czech Republic) 2010	(Turkey) 2014	(Spain) 2018	(Australia) 2022	(Germany) 2026	Total
Tunisia	–	–	–	–	–	–	–	–	–	–	–	–	–	16th	–	–	–	–	–	–	1
Total	0	0	0	0	0	0	0	0	0	0	0	0	0	1	0	0	0	0	0	TBD	

=== Participating teams ===
Nation	(Greece) 2012	(Russia) 2014	(China) 2016	(France) 2017	(Philippines) 2018	(Netherlands) 2019	(Belgium) 2022	(Austria) 2023	(Mongolia) 2025	(Poland) 2026	(Singapore) 2027	Total
Bahrain	–	–	–	19th	–	–	–	–	–			1
Egypt	–	–	–	–	–	–	16th	13th	–			2
Jordan	22nd	–	–	–	–	–	–	–	–			1
Syria	–	21st	–	–	–	–	–	–	–			1
Tunisia	–	18th	–	–	–	–	–	–	–			1
Total	1	2	0	1	0	0	1	1	0	TBD	TBD	
