= Basketball at the Arab Games =

Sports event

- Current season, competition or edition: Basketball at the 2023 Arab Games
- Sport: Basketball
- Founded: 1953
- No. of teams: 12
- Country: ABC Members
- Continent: ABC (Arab world)

Basketball has been an Arab Games event since the first edition in 1953 in Alexandria, Egypt.

== Men's tournaments ==
Year	Host	Final			Third-place game		
Year	Host	Champion	Score	Second Place	Third Place	Score	Fourth Place
1953; Details	(Egypt); Alexandria	Egypt	61 – 41	Syria	Jordan	44 – 23	Palestine
1957; Details	(Lebanon); Beirut	Lebanon	n / a	Syria	Tunisia	n / a	Morocco
1961; Details	(Morocco); Casablanca	UA Republic	n / a	Lebanon	Morocco	n / a	Libya
1965; Details	(United Arab Republic); Cairo	UA Republic	n / a	Sudan	Syria	n / a	Iraq
1976; Details	(Syria); Damascus		n / a			n / a	
1985; Details	(Morocco); Rabat	Jordan	n / a	Iraq	Tunisia	n / a	Syria
1992; Details	(Syria); Damascus	Syria	n / a	Jordan	Tunisia	n / a	Egypt
1997; Details	(Lebanon); Beirut	Saudi Arabia	n / a	Syria	United Arab Emirates	n / a	Lebanon
1999; Details	(Jordan); Amman	Egypt	97 – 68	Jordan	Qatar	n / a	Syria
2004; Details	(Algeria); Algiers	Egypt	n / a	Algeria	Libya	n / a	Qatar
2007; Details	(Egypt); Cairo	Egypt	76 – 73	Jordan	Qatar	91 – 70	Iraq
2011; Details	(Qatar); Doha	Qatar	78 – 70	Jordan	Egypt	88 – 71	Tunisia

=== Medal summary ===
Rank	Nation	Gold	Silver	Bronze	Total
1	Egypt	6	0	1	7
2	Jordan	1	4	1	6
3	Syria	1	3	1	5
4	Lebanon	1	1	0	2
5	Qatar	1	0	2	3
6	Saudi Arabia	1	0	0	1
7	Algeria	0	1	0	1
7	Iraq	0	1	0	1
7	Sudan	0	1	0	1
10	Tunisia	0	0	3	3
11	Libya	0	0	1	1
11	Morocco	0	0	1	1
11	United Arab Emirates	0	0	1	1
Totals (13 entries)		11	11	11	33

== Women's tournaments ==
Year	Host	Final			Third-place game		
Year	Host	Champion	Score	Second Place	Third Place	Score	Fourth Place
1985; Details	(Morocco); Rabat	Algeria	n/a	Morocco	Syria	n/a	
1992; Details	(Syria); Damascus	Egypt	n/a	Tunisia	Syria	n/a	
1997; Details	(Lebanon); Beirut	Egypt	n/a	Tunisia	Lebanon	n/a	
1999; Details	(Jordan); Amman	Tunisia	74 – 71	Egypt	Jordan	n/a	Syria
2004; Details	(Algeria); Algiers	Lebanon	n/a	Tunisia	Algeria	n/a	
2007; Details	(Egypt); Cairo	Not held					
2011; Details	(Qatar); Doha	Lebanon	n/a	Egypt	Jordan	n/a	Somalia

=== Medal summary ===
Rank	Nation	Gold	Silver	Bronze	Total
1	Egypt	2	2	0	4
2	Lebanon	2	0	1	3
3	Tunisia	1	3	0	4
4	Algeria	1	0	1	2
5	Morocco	0	1	0	1
6	Jordan	0	0	2	2
6	Syria	0	0	2	2
Totals (7 entries)		6	6	6	18

== 3x3 basketball at the Arab Games ==
=== 3x3 Men's tournaments ===
Year	Host	Final			Third-place game		
Year	Host	Champion	Score	Second Place	Third Place	Score	Fourth Place
2023; Details	Algeria (5 cities)^{a}	Algeria	19–18	Tunisia	Qatar	21–11	Palestine

^a Arab Games helds in 5 cities (Algiers, Oran, Constantine, Annaba and Tipaza). 3x3 basketball tournament helds in Algiers.

3x3 Men's Medal summary

Rank	Nation	Gold	Silver	Bronze	Total
1	Algeria	1	0	0	1
2	Tunisia	0	1	0	1
3	Qatar	0	0	1	1
Totals (3 entries)		1	1	1	3

=== 3x3 Women's tournaments ===
Year	Host	Final			Third-place game		
Year	Host	Champion	Score	Second Place	Third Place	Score	Fourth Place
2023; Details	Algeria (5 cities)^{a}	Tunisia	16–13	Algeria	Jordan	21–4	Saudi Arabia

^a Arab Games helds in 5 cities (Algiers, Oran, Constantine, Annaba and Tipaza). 3x3 basketball tournament helds in Algiers.

3x3 Women's Medal summary

Rank	Nation	Gold	Silver	Bronze	Total
1	Tunisia	1	0	0	1
2	Algeria	0	1	0	1
3	Jordan	0	0	1	1
Totals (3 entries)		1	1	1	3

== See also ==
- Arab Basketball Championship
- Arab Women's Basketball Championship
