= 2010 FIBA Asia Under-18 Championship qualification =

The 2010 FIBA Asia Under-18 Championship qualification was held in late 2009 and early 2010 with the Gulf region, West Asia, Southeast Asia, East Asia and Middle Asia (Central Asia and South Asia) each conducting tournaments.

== Qualification format ==
The following are eligible to participate:

- The organizing country.
- The champion team from the previous FIBA Asia Under-18 Championship.
- The four best-placed teams from the previous FIBA Asia Under-18 Championship will qualify the same number of teams from their respective sub-zones.
- The two best teams from the sub-zones.

== 2008 FIBA Asia Under-18 Championship ==
Rank	Team	Note
Gold medal	Iran	Direct Qualifier
Silver medal	Kazakhstan	Middle Asia (+1)
Bronze medal	Syria	West Asia (+1)
4	Japan	East Asia (+1)
5	China	East Asia (+2)
6	South Korea	
7	Philippines	
8	Lebanon	
9	Chinese Taipei	
10	Jordan	
11	Saudi Arabia	
12	Hong Kong	
13	India	
14	United Arab Emirates	
15	Malaysia	

== Qualified teams ==
East Asia (2+2)	Gulf (2)	Middle Asia (2+1)	Southeast Asia (2)	West Asia (2+2+1)
China	Saudi Arabia	Kazakhstan	Philippines	Yemen
Chinese Taipei	Qatar	India	Malaysia	Iran
Japan		Sri Lanka		Lebanon
South Korea				Iraq
				Syria

== East Asia ==
All the others withdrew, so China,Chinese Taipei,Japan,South Korea qualified automatically.

== Gulf ==
The Gulf U-17 Basketball Championship is the qualifying tournament for the 2010 FIBA Asia Under-18 Championship. it also serves as a regional championship. The two best teams qualifies for 2010 FIBA Asia Under-18 Championship.

=== Preliminary round ===
Team	Pld	W	L	PF	PA	PD	Pts
Bahrain	6	6	0	437	296	+141	12
Kuwait	6	4	2	360	319	+41	10
Saudi Arabia	6	2	4	365	384	-19	8
Qatar	6	0	6	276	439	-163	6

August 14
14:00

Bahrain	89–52	Qatar
Scoring by quarter: 27-11, 25-17, 26-9, 11–15

August 14
16:00

Saudi Arabia	54–64	Kuwait
Scoring by quarter: 10-9, 16-11, 20-14, 8–30

August 15
14:00

Bahrain	62–45	Kuwait
Scoring by quarter: 31-10, 9-13, 11-12, 11–10

August 15
16:00

Qatar	50–62	Saudi Arabia
Scoring by quarter: 13-15, 8-17, 7-13, 22–17

August 16
14:00

Bahrain	88–72	Saudi Arabia
Scoring by quarter: 31-8, 6-25, 30-16, 21–23

August 16
16:00

Kuwait	76–42	Qatar
Scoring by quarter: 18-11, 20-9, 17-8, 21–14

August 17
14:00

Qatar	24–71	Bahrain
Scoring by quarter: 5-14, 7-13, 10-28, 2–16

August 17
16:00

Kuwait	56–52	Saudi Arabia
Scoring by quarter: 15-5, 8-14, 21-16, 12–17

August 18
14:00

Kuwait	49–62	Bahrain
Scoring by quarter: 22-8, 9-23, 8-10, 10-21

August 18
16:00

Saudi Arabia	56–52	Qatar

August 19
14:00

Saudi Arabia	54–65	Bahrain
Scoring by quarter: 20-19, 3-14, 17-7, 14-25

August 19
16:00

Qatar	47–70	Kuwait
Scoring by quarter: 12-12, 14-17, 10-13, 36-28

== Middle Asia – SAARC ==
The 2010 Middle Asia – SAARC qualifying tournament was held from August 12 to 14, 2010 in Bangalore, India. The two best teams qualifies for 2010 FIBA Asia Under-18 Championship.

=== Preliminary round ===
Team	Pld	W	L	PF	PA	PD	Pts
India	3	3	0	255	138	+117	6
Sri Lanka	3	2	1	191	189	+2	5
Bangladesh	3	1	2	157	204	-47	4
Nepal	3	0	3	137	209	-72	3

August 12
16:00

India	80–50	Nepal

Sri Kanteerava Stadium, Bangalore

August 12
17:30

Sri Lanka	80–51	Bangladesh

Sri Kanteerava Stadium, Bangalore

August 13
16:00

Sri Lanka	67–54	Nepal

Sri Kanteerava Stadium, Bangalore

August 13
17:30

India	91–44	Bangladesh

Sri Kanteerava Stadium, Bangalore

August 14
16:00

Bangladesh	62–33	Nepal

Sri Kanteerava Stadium, Bangalore

August 14
17:30

India	84–44	Sri Lanka

Sri Kanteerava Stadium, Bangalore

== Middle Asia – Stans ==
All the others withdrew, so Kazakhstan qualified automatically.

== Southeast Asia ==
The 2010 SEABA Under-18 Championship is the qualifying tournament for the 2010 FIBA Asia Under-18 Championship; it also serves as a regional championship involving Southeast Asian basketball teams. It was held on June 5 to June 9, 2010, at Yangon, Myanmar. The top two finishers qualifies to the 2010 FIBA Asia Under-18 Championship.

=== Preliminary round ===
Team	Pld	W	L	PF	PA	PD	Pts
Philippines	5	5	0	475	206	+269	10
Malaysia	5	3	2	392	305	+87	8
Singapore	5	3	2	292	278	+14	8
Thailand	5	3	2	281	280	+1	8
Myanmar	5	1	4	270	414	−144	6
Laos	5	0	5	220	447	−227	5

July 5
10:00

Myanmar	70–62	Laos

Thuwunna Stadium, Yangon

July 5
12:00

Malaysia	39–47	Philippines

Thuwunna Stadium, Yangon

July 5
14:00

Thailand	39–47	Singapore

Thuwunna Stadium, Yangon

July 6
9:00

Philippines	108–39	Myanmar

Thuwunna Stadium, Yangon

July 6
11:00

Singapore	51–60	Malaysia

Thuwunna Stadium, Yangon

July 6
13:00

Laos	44–71	Thailand

Thuwunna Stadium, Yangon

July 7
9:00

Singapore	40–78	Philippines

Thuwunna Stadium, Yangon

July 7
11:00

Myanmar	52–58	Thailand

Thuwunna Stadium, Yangon

July 7
13:00

Malaysia	97–53	Laos

Thuwunna Stadium, Yangon

July 8
9:00

Myanmar	70–78	Singapore

Thuwunna Stadium, Yangon

July 8
11:00

Thailand	75–68	Malaysia

Thuwunna Stadium, Yangon

July 8
9:00

Philippines	133–30	Laos

Thuwunna Stadium, Yangon

July 9
9:00

Singapore	76–31	Laos
Scoring by quarter: 26-12, 20-0, 10-8, 20–11

Thuwunna Stadium, Yangon

July 9
11:00

Malaysia	108–39	Myanmar
Scoring by quarter: 38-7, 27-3, 21-14, 22–15

Thuwunna Stadium, Yangon

July 9
13:00

Philippines	69–38	Thailand

Thuwunna Stadium, Yangon

== West Asia ==
The 2010 WABA Under-18 Championship is the qualifying tournament for the 2010 FIBA Asia Under-18 Championship. It also serves as a regional championship involving West Asian basketball teams. the four best teams excluding Yemen qualifies for 2010 FIBA Asia Under-18 Championship. The tournament was held from April 19 to April 24, 2010, in Beirut, Lebanon.

=== Preliminary round ===
Team	Pld	W	L	Pts
Lebanon	5	5	0	10
Iran	5	4	1	9
Iraq	5	2	3	7
Syria	5	2	3	7
Jordan	5	1	4	6
Yemen	5	1	4	6

April 19
16:00

Iraq	80–77	Syria

April 19
18:00

Lebanon	66–64	Yemen

April 19
20:00

Iran	69–47	Jordan

April 20
16:00

Yemen	Win–Lost	Iraq

April 20
18:00

Lebanon	71–68	Iran

April 20
20:00

Syria	Win–Lost	Jordan

April 21
16:00

Jordan	64–62	Yemen

April 21
18:00

Lebanon	65–57	Iraq

April 21
20:00

Iran	78–67	Syria

April 22
16:00

Yemen	71–75	Syria

April 22
18:00

Lebanon	77–71	Jordan

April 22
20:00

Iran	Win–Lost	Iraq

April 23
16:00

Jordan	Win–Lost	Iraq

April 23
18:00

Lebanon	87–74	Syria

April 23
20:00

Iran	Win–Lost	Yemen
