= Arab Women's U18 3x3 Basketball Championship =

Regional U18 women's 3×3 basketball tournament for Arab national teams

Arab Women's U18 3×3 Basketball Championship
- Sport: 3×3 Basketball
- Founded: 2024
- Most recent season: Qatar (2025)
- Organising body: Arab Basketball Confederation
- No. of teams: 6–8
- Country: ABC members
- Continent: ABC (Arab world)
- Most titles: Jordan & Qatar (1 each)
- 2025 Arab Women's U18 3×3 Basketball Championship

The Arab Women's U18 3×3 Basketball Championship (Arabic: البطولة العربية لكرة السلة 3×3 تحت 18 سنة للسيدات) is a regional youth 3×3 tournament contested by under‑18 women's national teams of the Arab Basketball Confederation.

== History ==
- The first edition was held in Muscat, Oman (2-5 March 2024), with Egypt winning the inaugural title, defeating Iraq in the final.
- The second edition was held in Muscat, Oman (November 25–26, 2025). Qatar won gold, defeating Kuwait in the final. Oman took bronze.

== Editions ==
Edition	Year	Host	Champion	Runner-up	Third place	Fourth place
1	2024	Muscat, Oman	Egypt	Iraq	Kuwait	-
2	2025	Muscat, Oman	Qatar	Kuwait	Oman	–

== Titles by team ==
Team	Titles	Runners-up	Third place	Fourth place
Jordan	1	–	–	–
Qatar	1	–	–	–
Egypt	–	1	–	–
Kuwait	–	1	–	–
Morocco	–	–	1	–
Algeria	–	–	–	1
Oman	–	–	1	–

== All-time medal table ==
Arab Women's U18 3×3 Basketball Championship (2024–present)
Rank	Nation	Gold	Silver	Bronze	Total
1	Jordan (JOR)	1	0	0	1
1	Qatar (QAT)	1	0	0	1
3	Egypt (EGY)	0	1	0	1
3	Kuwait (KUW)	0	1	0	1
5	Morocco (MAR)	0	0	1	1
5	Oman (OMA)	0	0	1	1
Totals (6 entries)		2	2	2	6
