= 2025 Arab Women's Basketball Championship =

البطولة العربية لكرة السلة للسيدات 2025

Tournament details
- Host country: Egypt
- City: Cairo
- Dates: 1–8 July
- Teams: 4 (from 1 confederation)
- Venue: 1 (in 1 host city)

Final positions
- Champions: Egypt (6th title)
- Runners-up: Tunisia
- Third place: Jordan
- Fourth place: Algeria

Tournament statistics
- Games played: 5

2025 Arab Women's Basketball Championship was the 15th edition of the Arab Women's Basketball Championship, a women's basketball regional championship of the Arab world. The tournament was hosted by Egypt from 1 to 8 July at Hall 3 of the Cairo International Stadium.

== Host selection ==
The Arab Basketball Confederation selected Egypt to host the 15th edition of the Arab Women's Basketball Championship, continuing its tradition of organizing the event in Cairo following successful editions in 2017 and 2023.

== Participating teams ==
- Egypt – Egypt
- Tunisia – Tunisia
- Jordan – Jordan
- Algeria – Algeria

== squads ==
The Egyptian national team was led by Spanish head coach Julián Martínez.

== Match Plan ==
https://www.facebook.com/photo/?fbid=1075803521355806&set=a.508618438074320

== Preliminary round ==
1 July 2025

ABC

Jordan	78–67	Tunisia

Cairo Stadium, Cairo

2 July 2025

ScoreGates abc

Egypt	89–54	Algeria

Cairo Stadium, Cairo

3 July 2025

ABC

Tunisia	78–67	Algeria

Cairo

3 July 2025

ABC

Egypt	92–71	Jordan

Cairo

5 July 2025

Jordan	72–71	Algeria

Cairo

5 July 2025

ABC

Egypt	80–55	Tunisia

Cairo

== Knockout stage ==
6 July 2025

CAB

Egypt	77–58	Algeria

Cairo

6 July 2025

CAB

Tunisia	79–76	Jordan

Cairo

8 July 2025

CAB

Jordan	71–67	Algeria

Cairo

8 July 2025

TAP CAB

Egypt	92–74	Tunisia

Cairo Stadium, Cairo

== Final standings ==
Rank	Team	Record
1st place, gold medalist(s)	Egypt	5–0
2nd place, silver medalist(s)	Tunisia	2–3
3rd place, bronze medalist(s)	Jordan	3–2
4	Algeria	0–5

== See also ==
2025 Arab Basketball Championship
