= Arab Women's U18 Basketball Championship =

Regional U18 women's basketball tournament for Arab national teams

- Sport: Basketball
- Founded: 2024
- Most recent season: Egypt (2025)
- Organising body: Arab Basketball Confederation
- No. of teams: 4 (2024), 3 (2025)
- Country: ABC members
- Continent: ABC (Arab world)
- Most titles: Lebanon & Egypt (1 title each)
- 2025 Arab Women's U18 Basketball Championship

The Arab Women's U18 Basketball Championship (Arabic: البطولة العربية لكرة السلة تحت 18 سنة للسيدات) is a regional youth tournament contested by under‑18 women's national teams of the Arab Basketball Confederation. It was first held in 2024 in Cairo, Egypt, with Lebanon winning the inaugural title. The second edition was held in August 2025, also in Cairo, with Egypt crowned champions.

== History ==
The championship was created to mirror the men's U18 competition and provide a platform for Arab women's youth basketball.

- The first edition in 2024 featured Lebanon, Jordan, Egypt, and Tunisia. Lebanon won the gold medal, defeating Jordan in the final. Egypt finished third, while Tunisia placed fourth.
- The second edition in 2025 featured Egypt, Tunisia, and Algeria. Egypt won the title, defeating Tunisia in the final. Algeria finished third.

== Editions ==
Edition	Year	Host	Champion	Runner-up	Third place	Fourth place
1	2024	Cairo, Egypt	Lebanon	Jordan	Egypt	Tunisia
2	2025	Cairo, Egypt	Egypt	Tunisia	Algeria	–
3	2026	Sfax, Tunisia	Tunisia	Morocco	–	–

== Titles by team ==
Team	Titles	Runners-up	Third place	Fourth place
Lebanon	1	–	–	–
Egypt	1	1	1	–
Tunisia	–	1	1	1
Jordan	–	1	–	–
Algeria	–	–	1	–

== All-time medal table ==
Arab Women's U18 Basketball Championship (2024–present)
Rank	Nation	Gold	Silver	Bronze	Total
1	Egypt (EGY)	1	0	1	2
2	Lebanon (LBN)	1	0	0	1
3	Jordan (JOR)	0	1	0	1
3	Tunisia (TUN)	0	1	0	1
5	Algeria (ALG)	0	0	1	1
Totals (5 entries)		2	2	2	6

== See also ==
- Arab U18 Basketball Championship (men)
- Arab Women's Basketball Championship
