= Arab Women's Basketball Championship =

Regional basketball tournament

- Current season, competition or edition: 2025 Arab Women's Basketball Championship
- Sport: Basketball
- Founded: 1983
- No. of teams: 10
- Country: ABC Members
- Continent: ABC (Arab world)
- Most recent champion: Egypt (6th title)
- Most titles: Egypt (6 titles)

The Arab Women's Basketball Championship (Arabic: البطولة العربية لكرة السلة للسيدات) or simply AWBC is a regional basketball tournament which takes place every two years between women's national teams of the members of the Arab Basketball Confederation, representing the Arab world. The first edition was held in 1983 in Jordan.

== Statistics ==
=== Winners ===
Year	Host	Final			Third-place game		
Year	Host	Champion	Score	Second Place	Third Place	Score	Fourth Place
1983; Details	Jordan	Iraq	–	Somalia	Lebanon	–	Jordan
1986	Egypt	Not held (because the legal number was not complete)			Not held (because the legal number was not complete)		
1987; Details	Egypt	Algeria	–	Egypt	Palestine		
1989; Details	Syria	Tunisia	–	Syria	Egypt	–	Algeria
1992; Details	Syria	Egypt	–	Tunisia	Syria	–	Lebanon
1994; Details	Egypt	Egypt	–	Tunisia	Algeria	–	Syria
1997; Details	Lebanon	Egypt	–	Tunisia	Lebanon	–	Jordan
1999; Details	Jordan	Tunisia	–	Egypt	Syria	–	Jordan
2000; Details	Algeria	Algeria	–	Lebanon	Egypt	–	Morocco
2003; Details	Jordan	Lebanon	–	Tunisia	Egypt	–	Syria
2011; Details	Qatar	Lebanon	–	Egypt	Jordan	–	Somalia
2017; Details	Egypt	Egypt	–	Tunisia	Jordan	–	Iraq
2023; Details	Egypt	Egypt	96–75	Morocco	Algeria	74–37	Kuwait
2025; Details	Egypt	Egypt	92–74	Tunisia	Jordan	71–67	Algeria

=== Titles by team ===
Team	Titles	Runners-up	Third-place	Fourth-place
Egypt	6 (1992, 1994*, 1997, 2017*, 2023*, 2025*)	3 (1987*, 1999, 2011)	3 (1989, 2000, 2003)	–
Tunisia	2 (1989, 1999)	6 (1992, 1994, 1997, 2003, 2017, 2025)	–	–
Lebanon	2 (2003, 2011)	1 (2000)	2 (1983, 1997*)	1 (1992)
Algeria	2 (1987, 2000*)	–	2 (1994, 2023)	2 (1989, 2025)
Iraq	1 (1983*)	–	–	1 (2017)
Syria	–	1 (1989*)	2 (1992*, 1999)	2 (1994, 2003)
Somalia	–	1 (1983)	–	1 (2011)
Morocco	–	1 (2023)	–	1 (2000)
Jordan	–	–	3 (2011, 2017, 2025)	3 (1983*, 1997, 1999*)
Palestine	–	–	1 (1987)	–
Kuwait	–	–	–	1 (2023)

* hosts.

== See also ==
- Arab Women's U18 Basketball Championship
