= Mamlouk =

Mamlouk is a surname. Notable people with the surname include:

- Ali Mamlouk (born 1946), Syrian intelligence officer and special security and military advisor
- Jehan Mamlouk (born 1993), Syrian basketball player
