= Jehan Mamlouk =

Syrian basketball player

Jehan Mamlouk جيهان مملوك
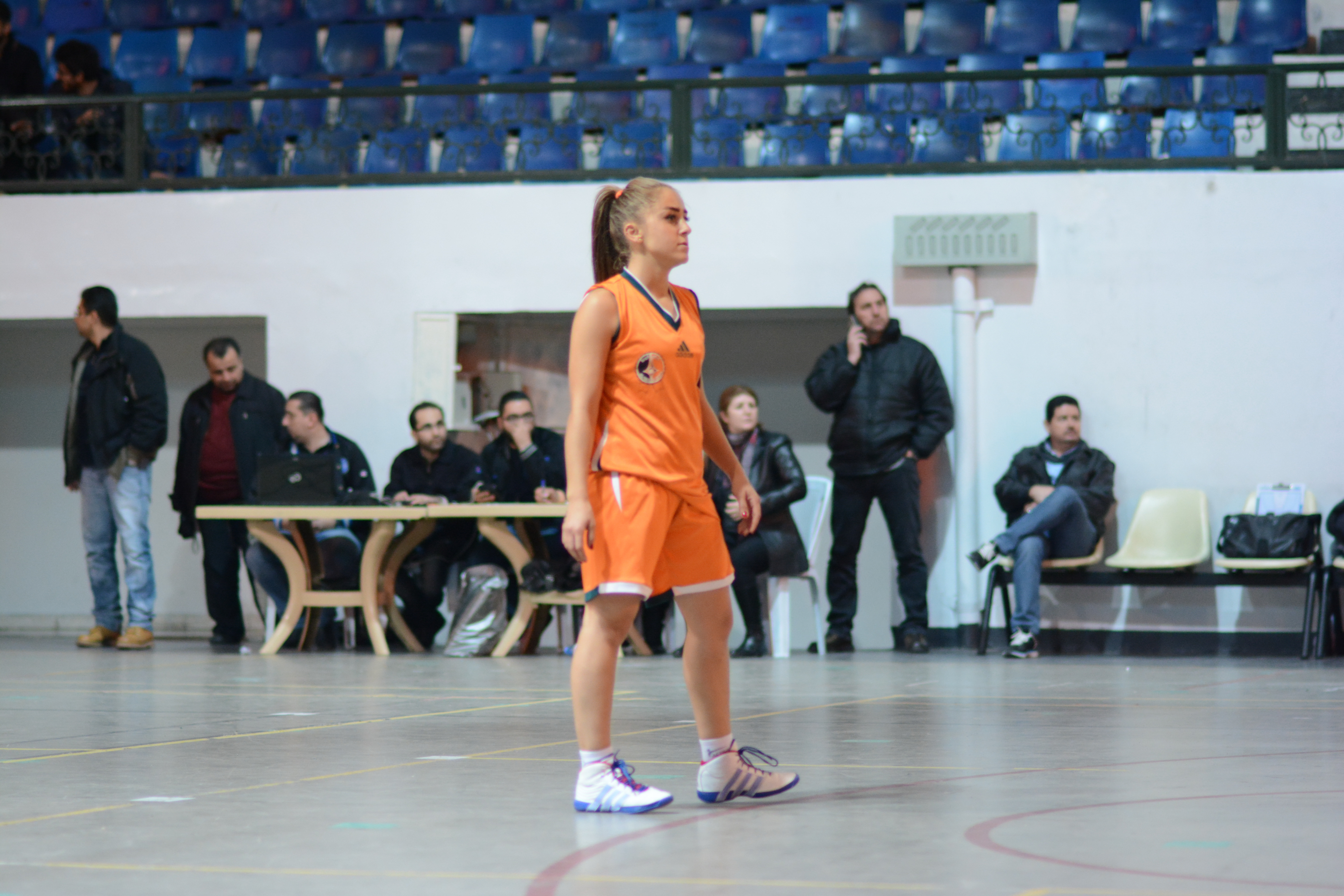
- Mamlouk in 2014

No. 6 – Tishreen SC
- Position: Point guard
- League: SWBL

Personal information
- Born: 10 January 1993 (age 33) Damascus, Syria
- Listed height: 1.62 m (5 ft 4 in)
- Listed weight: 68 kg (150 lb)

Career information
- WNBA draft: 2013: undrafted
- Playing career: 2005–present

Career history
- 2005–2007: Al-Thawra
- 2008–2021: Al-Wahda SC
- 2021–present: Tishreen SC

Career highlights
- 8x Syrian Women Basketball League champion (2010–2017) with Al-Wahda SC; 7x Syrian Basketball Cup champion (2010– 2016) with Al-Wahda SC

Jehan Mamlouk (born 10 January 1993) is a Syrian basketball player who plays in Tishreen SC since 2021 and in the Syria women's national basketball team. She studied at the Syrian Private University.

== Professional career ==
=== Al-Thawra (2005–2007) ===
Her sports career began with Al-Thawra in the year 2005.

=== Al-Wahda (2010–2021) ===
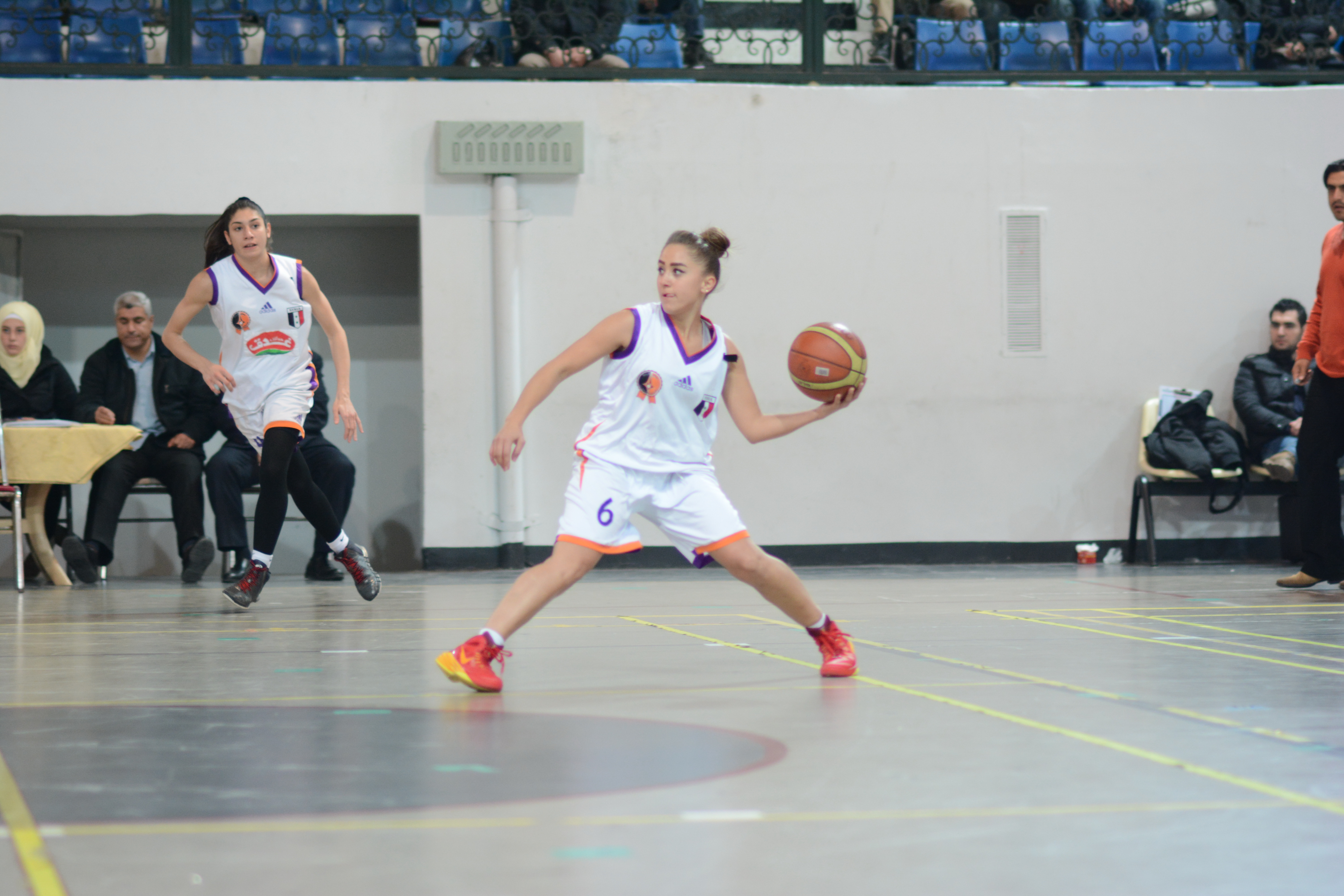
Jehan Mamlouk in 2014

In 2010, she participated in FIBA Asia Under-18 Cup for Women held in Thailand. Just after the Asian U18 Cup she was injured by the cruciate ligament.

In the seasons 2011–2016, she won the champions double with Al-Wahda 6 times and defended the title in both competitions.

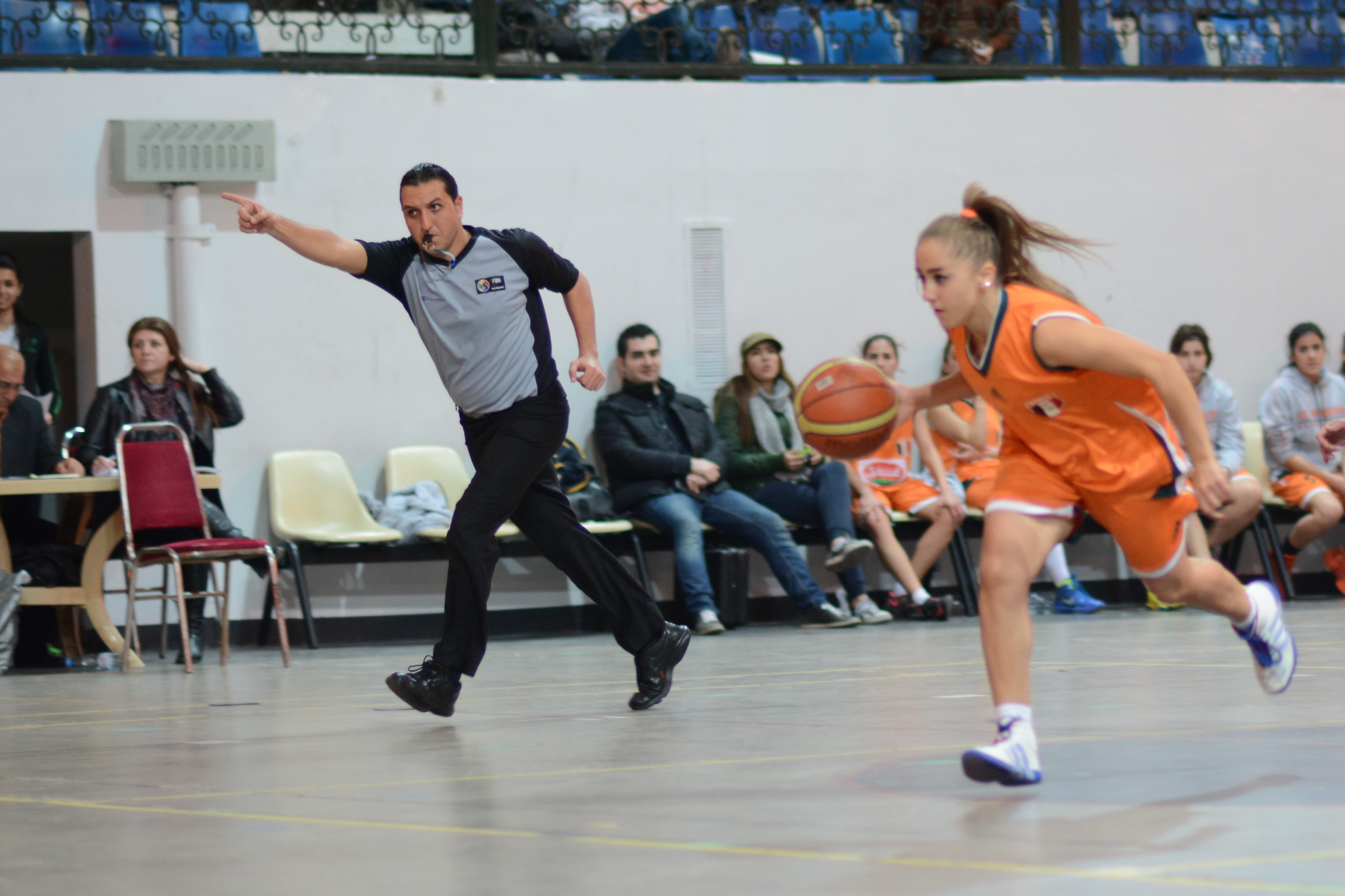
Jehan Mamlouk in the 2015 season

She achieved with Al Wahda Club the runner-up title in the West Asian Women's Basketball Championship for the 2015 season.

Her last big club success so far was born in the 2019 season, when she reached the SWBL final, in which her club was defeated by her parent team Thawra.

=== Tishreen SC (2021–present) ===
At the beginning of the 2022 season, she transferred to the Tishreen SC Latakia.

=== Syria women's national basketball team ===
Her biggest achievements in the national team are qualifying for the West Asian Championship finals and participating in the 2021 FIBA Women's Asia Cup Division B.

== Personal life ==
In 2017, she graduated from the Higher Institute of Dramatic Arts.
