= Kuwait women's national under-18 basketball team =

Women's basketball in Kuwait

Kuwait
- FIBA zone: FIBA Asia
- National federation: Kuwait Basketball Association

U19 World Cup
- Appearances: None

U18 Asia Cup
- Appearances: 1 (1977)
- Medals: None

The Kuwait women's national under-18 basketball team is a national basketball team of Kuwait, administered by the Kuwait Basketball Association. It represents the country in international under-18 women's basketball competitions.

== FIBA Under-18 Women's Asia Cup ==
In 1977, Kuwait hosted the Under-18 Asian Championship. The host team finished in 8th place. This was Kuwait's only participation in the FIBA Under-18 Women's Asia Cup to date.

== See also ==
- Kuwait women's national basketball team
- Kuwait men's national under-18 basketball team
