= 1996 ABC Under-18 Championship for Women =

1996 FIBA U18 Women's Asia Cup
13th FIBA Under-18 Women's Asian Basketball Championship

Tournament details
- Host country: Thailand
- Dates: April 21–28
- Teams: 12 (from 44 federations)
- Venue: 1 (in 1 host city)

Final positions
- Champions: China (6th title)

The ABC Under-18 Championship for Women 1996 is the 13th edition of the ABC's junior championship for basketball. The games were held at Bangkok, Thailand from April 21–28, 1996.

== Preliminary round ==
=== Group A ===
Team	Pld	W	L	PF	PA	PD	Pts
South Korea	5	5	0	592	215	+377	10
Chinese Taipei	5	4	1	507	213	+294	9
Thailand	5	3	2	398	274	+124	8
Jordan	5	2	3	186	454	−268	7
Sri Lanka	5	1	4	177	405	−228	6
Hong Kong	5	0	5	147	446	−299	5

Sri Lanka	17–97	Chinese Taipei
Scoring by half: 6–45, 11–52

Bangkok

Jordan	39–135	South Korea
Scoring by half: 22–71, 17–64

Bangkok

Thailand	93–23	Hong Kong
Scoring by half: 42–11, 51–12

Bangkok

South Korea	134–25	Sri Lanka
Scoring by half: 65–12, 69–13

Bangkok

Chinese Taipei	137–30	Hong Kong
Scoring by half: 79–18, 58–12

Bangkok

Thailand	92–21	Jordan
Scoring by half: 49–13, 43–8

Bangkok

Hong Kong	42–47	Jordan
Scoring by half: 22–24, 20–23

Bangkok

Sri Lanka	39–83	Thailand
Scoring by half: 20–42, 19–41

Bangkok

Chinese Taipei	67–80	South Korea
Scoring by half: 31–39, 36–41

Bangkok

Jordan	58–57	Sri Lanka
Scoring by half: 28–33, 30–24

Bangkok

South Korea	130–19	Hong Kong
Scoring by half: 71–12, 59–7

Bangkok

Thailand	65–78	Chinese Taipei
Scoring by half: 20–42, 45–36

Bangkok

Chinese Taipei	128–21	Jordan
Scoring by half: 63–8, 65–13

Bangkok

Hong Kong	33–39	Sri Lanka
Scoring by half: 16–15, 17–24

Bangkok

South Korea	113–65	Thailand
Scoring by half: 54–28, 59–37

Bangkok

=== Group B ===
Team	Pld	W	L	PF	PA	PD	Pts
Japan	5	5	0	501	208	+293	10
China	5	4	1	491	188	+303	9
India	5	3	2	290	314	−24	8
Kyrgyzstan	5	2	3	280	390	−110	7
Malaysia	5	1	4	239	354	−115	6
Philippines	5	0	5	189	536	−347	5

Japan	162–32	Philippines
Scoring by half: 85–16, 77–16

Bangkok

Malaysia	62–67	Kyrgyzstan
Scoring by half: 30–32, 32–35

Bangkok

China	84–31	India
Scoring by half: 44–16, 40–15

Bangkok

India	70–49	Malaysia
Scoring by half: 30–28, 40–21

Bangkok

Philippines	25–132	China
Scoring by half: 10–67, 15–65

Bangkok

Kyrgyzstan	33–102	Japan
Scoring by half: 18–57, 15–45

Bangkok

Philippines	41–68	India
Scoring by half: 18–37, 23–31

Bangkok

Malaysia	25–74	Japan
Scoring by half: 19–45, 6–29

Bangkok

China	99–33	Kyrgyzstan
Scoring by half: 50–16, 49–17

Bangkok

China	94–16	Malaysia
Scoring by half: 52–11, 42–5

Bangkok

Kyrgyzstan	87–42	Philippines
Scoring by half: 43–15, 44–27

Bangkok

Japan	80–36	India
Scoring by half: 47–24, 33–12

Bangkok

India	85–60	Kyrgyzstan
Scoring by half: 44–26, 41–34

Bangkok

Philippines	49–87	Malaysia
Scoring by half: 21–42, 28–45

Bangkok

Japan	83–82	China
Scoring by half: 30–42, 53–40

Bangkok

== Classification 5th–12th ==
=== 11th place ===
Hong Kong	52–58	Philippines
Scoring by half: 27–36, 25–22

Bangkok

=== 9th place ===
Sri Lanka	65–79	Malaysia
Scoring by half: 25–43, 40–36

Bangkok

=== 7th place ===
Jordan	38–71	Kyrgyzstan
Scoring by half: 20–42, 18–29

Bangkok

=== 5th place ===
Thailand	84–76	India
Scoring by half: 44–42, 40–34

Bangkok

== Final round ==
Semifinals
April 27
South Korea	62
China	73
April 27
Japan	76
Chinese Taipei	64

Final
April 28
China	66
Japan	63
3rd place
April 28
South Korea	77
Chinese Taipei	76

=== Semifinals ===
April 27

South Korea	62–73	China
Scoring by half: 36–43, 26–30

Bangkok

April 27

Japan	76–64	Chinese Taipei
Scoring by half: 52–39, 24–25

Bangkok

=== 3rd place ===
April 28

South Korea	77–76	Chinese Taipei
Scoring by half: 47–37, 30–39

Bangkok

=== Final ===
April 28

China	66–63	Japan
Scoring by half: 29–33, 37–30

Bangkok

== Final standing ==
Qualified for the 1997 FIBA Under-19 World Championship for Women

Rank	Team	Record
1st place, gold medalist(s)	China	6–1
2nd place, silver medalist(s)	Japan	6–1
3rd place, bronze medalist(s)	South Korea	6–1
4	Chinese Taipei	4–3
5	Thailand	4–2
6	India	3–3
7	Kyrgyzstan	3–3
8	Jordan	2–4
9	Malaysia	2–4
10	Sri Lanka	1–5
11	Philippines	1–5
12	Hong Kong	0–6

== Awards ==
1996 Asian Under-18 champions

China
Sixth title
