= 1986 ABC Championship for Women =

1986 FIBA Women's Asia Cup
11th Asian Women's Basketball Championship

Tournament details
- Host country: Malaysia
- Dates: June 1–8
- Teams: 10 (from all Asian federations)
- Venue: 1 (in 1 host city)

Final positions
- Champions: China (2nd title)

The 1986 Asian Basketball Confederation Championship for Women were held in Kuala Lumpur, Malaysia

== Preliminary round ==
=== Group A ===
Team	Pld	W	L	PF	PA	PD	Pts
South Korea	4	4	0	487	137	+350	8
Japan	4	3	1	379	169	+210	7
Malaysia	4	2	2	163	315	−152	6
Singapore	4	1	3	172	331	−159	5
Indonesia	4	0	4	162	411	−249	4

June 1
14:30

South Korea	125–26	Singapore
Scoring by half: 68–10, 57–16

Stadium Negara, Kuala Lumpur

June 1
19:30

Malaysia	65–60	Indonesia
Scoring by half: 40–27, 25–33

Stadium Negara, Kuala Lumpur

June 2
16:00

Indonesia	24–163	South Korea
Scoring by half: 18–82, 6–81

Stadium Negara, Kuala Lumpur

June 2
21:00

Japan	87–29	Malaysia
Scoring by half: 45–10, 42–19

Stadium Negara, Kuala Lumpur

June 3
19:30

South Korea	76–64	Japan
Scoring by half: 45–37, 31–27

Stadium Negara, Kuala Lumpur

June 3
21:30

Singapore	70–45	Indonesia
Scoring by half: 37–19, 33–26

Stadium Negara, Kuala Lumpur

June 4
14:30

Malaysia	46–45	Singapore
Scoring by half: 31–24, 15–21

Stadium Negara, Kuala Lumpur

June 4
16:00

Japan	113–33	Indonesia
Scoring by half: 50–18, 63–15

Stadium Negara, Kuala Lumpur

June 5
9:00

Singapore	31–115	Japan
Scoring by half: 9–64, 22–51

Stadium Negara, Kuala Lumpur

June 5
16:00

South Korea	123–23	Malaysia
Scoring by half: 66–7, 57–16

Stadium Negara, Kuala Lumpur

=== Group B ===
Team	Pld	W	L	PF	PA	PD	Pts
China	4	4	0	528	173	+355	8
Chinese Taipei	4	3	1	371	265	+106	7
Thailand	4	2	2	215	338	−123	6
Syria	4	1	3	169	367	−198	5
India	4	0	4	238	378	−140	4

June 1
16:00

India	59–61	Syria
Scoring by half: 32–28, 27–33

Stadium Negara, Kuala Lumpur

June 1
21:00

China	96–64	Chinese Taipei
Scoring by half: 55–37, 41–27

Stadium Negara, Kuala Lumpur

June 2
14:30

Thailand	36–143	China
Scoring by half: 16–60, 20–83

Stadium Negara, Kuala Lumpur

June 2
19:30

Chinese Taipei	109–70	India
Scoring by half: 54–36, 55–34

Stadium Negara, Kuala Lumpur

June 3
14:30

Syria	38–72	Thailand
Scoring by half: 16–38, 22–34

Stadium Negara, Kuala Lumpur

June 3
16:00

China	150–53	India
Scoring by half: 89–25, 61–28

Stadium Negara, Kuala Lumpur

June 4
19:30

India	56–58	Thailand
Scoring by half: 33–31, 23–27

Stadium Negara, Kuala Lumpur

June 4
21:30

Chinese Taipei	97–50	Syria
Scoring by half: 52–27, 45–23

Stadium Negara, Kuala Lumpur

June 5
10:30

Thailand	49–101	Chinese Taipei
Scoring by half: 27–55, 22–46

Stadium Negara, Kuala Lumpur

June 5
14:30

Syria	20–139	China
Scoring by half: 18–60, 2–79

Stadium Negara, Kuala Lumpur

== Final round ==
- The results and the points of the matches between the same teams that were already played during the preliminary round shall be taken into account for the final round.

=== Classification 7th–10th ===
Team	Pld	W	L	PF	PA	PD	Pts	Tiebreaker
India	3	2	1	212	166	+46	5	1–1 / 1.080
Singapore	3	2	1	187	154	+33	5	1–1 / 1.073
Syria	3	2	1	181	174	+7	5	1–1 / 0.863
Indonesia	3	0	3	148	234	−86	3	

June 6
13:30

Singapore	52–63	India
Scoring by half: 27–36, 25–27

Stadium Negara, Kuala Lumpur

June 6
15:00

Indonesia	50–74	Syria
Scoring by half: 26–54, 24–20

Stadium Negara, Kuala Lumpur

June 7
13:30

India	90–53	Indonesia
Scoring by half: 41–23, 49–30

Stadium Negara, Kuala Lumpur

June 7
15:00

Syria	46–65	Singapore
Scoring by half: 23–23, 23–42

Stadium Negara, Kuala Lumpur

=== Championship ===
Team	Pld	W	L	PF	PA	PD	Pts
China	5	5	0	538	256	+282	10
South Korea	5	4	1	450	287	+163	9
Chinese Taipei	5	3	2	402	321	+81	8
Japan	5	2	3	423	316	+107	7
Thailand	5	1	4	235	538	−303	6
Malaysia	5	0	5	155	485	−330	5

June 6
18:00

Japan	140–33	Thailand
Scoring by half: 72–20, 68–13

Stadium Negara, Kuala Lumpur

June 6
19:30

Malaysia	27–110	China
Scoring by half: 8–69, 19–49

Stadium Negara, Kuala Lumpur

June 6
21:00

South Korea	74–62	Chinese Taipei
Scoring by half: 35–30, 39–32

Stadium Negara, Kuala Lumpur

June 7
18:00

Chinese Taipei	104–34	Malaysia
Scoring by half: 55–24, 49–10

Stadium Negara, Kuala Lumpur

June 7
19:30

Thailand	56–112	South Korea
Scoring by half: 26–52, 30–60

Stadium Negara, Kuala Lumpur

June 7
21:00

China	107–64	Japan
Scoring by half: 65–29, 42–35

Stadium Negara, Kuala Lumpur

June 8
18:00

Malaysia	42–61	Thailand
Scoring by half: 21–35, 21–26

Stadium Negara, Kuala Lumpur

June 8
19:30

Japan	68–71	Chinese Taipei
Scoring by half: 28–38, 40–33

Stadium Negara, Kuala Lumpur

June 8
21:00

South Korea	65–82	China
Scoring by half: 39–47, 26–35

Stadium Negara, Kuala Lumpur

== Final standing ==
Qualified for the 1986 FIBA World Championship for Women

Rank	Team	Record
1st place, gold medalist(s)	China	7–0
2nd place, silver medalist(s)	South Korea	6–1
3rd place, bronze medalist(s)	Chinese Taipei	5–2
4	Japan	4–3
5	Thailand	3–4
6	Malaysia	2–5
7	India	2–4
8	Singapore	2–4
9	Syria	2–4
10	Indonesia	0–6

== Awards ==
1986 Asian champions

China
Second title
