= Syria women's national basketball team =

Syria's basketball team

Syria
- FIBA ranking: 84 (18 March 2026)
- Joined FIBA: 1948
- FIBA zone: FIBA Asia
- National federation: Syrian Basketball Federation
- Coach: Somar Khoury
- Nickname(s): Nosour Qasioun (Arabic: نسور قاسيون, lit. 'Qasioun Eagles')

Olympic Games
- Appearances: None

World Cup
- Appearances: None

Asia Cup
- Appearances: 2 (1986, 2021)
- Medals: None

Mediterranean Games
- Appearances: 1
- Medals: (bronze) Bronze: (1987)

Arab Women's Championship
- Appearances: 5
- Medals: (silver) Silver: (1989); (bronze) Bronze: (1992, 1999)
Home	Away

The Syria women's national basketball team is the nationally controlled basketball team representing Syria at world basketball competitions for women, administered by the Syrian Basketball Federation.

Syria made their debut in the Asian Championships in 1986, finishing in ninth place.

== Competition record ==
=== Summer Olympics ===
Summer Olympics
Year	Round	Position
From (Canada) 1976 To (France) 2024	–	Did not qualify
(United States) 2028	–	To be determined

=== World Championships ===
FIBA Women's World Cup
Year	Round	Position
From (Chile) 1953 To (Germany) 2026	–	Did not qualify
(Japan) 2030	–	To be determined

=== Asian championship ===
Asian Cup Record
Year	Division A				Division B			
Year	Position	Pld	W	L	Position	Pld	W	L
(South Korea) 1965	Did not participate				No Division B / Level II			
(Taiwan) 1968	Did not participate				No Division B / Level II			
(Malaysia) 1970	Did not participate				No Division B / Level II			
(Taiwan) 1972	Did not participate				No Division B / Level II			
(South Korea) 1974	Did not participate				No Division B / Level II			
(Hong Kong) 1976	Did not participate				No Division B / Level II			
(Malaysia) 1978	Did not participate				No Division B / Level II			
(Hong Kong) 1980	Did not participate				No Division B / Level II			
(Japan) 1982	Did not participate				No Division B / Level II			
(China) 1984	Did not participate				No Division B / Level II			
(Malaysia) 1986	9th	6	2	4	No Division B / Level II			
(Hong Kong) 1988	Did not participate				No Division B / Level II			
(Singapore) 1990	Did not participate				Did not qualify			
(South Korea) 1992	Did not participate				Did not qualify			
(Japan) 1994	Did not participate				Did not qualify			
(Japan) 1995	Did not participate				Did not qualify			
(Thailand) 1997	Did not participate				Did not qualify			
(Japan) 1999	Did not participate				Did not qualify			
(Thailand) 2001	Did not participate				Did not qualify			
(Japan) 2004	Did not participate				Did not qualify			
(China) 2005	Did not participate				Did not qualify			
(South Korea) 2007	Did not participate				Did not qualify			
(India) 2009	Did not participate				Did not qualify			
(Japan) 2011	Did not participate				Did not qualify			
(Thailand) 2013	Did not participate				Did not qualify			
(China) 2015	Did not participate				Did not qualify			
(India) 2017	Did not participate				Did not qualify			
(India) 2019	Did not participate				Did not qualify			
(Jordan) 2021	13th	Level II			5th	4	2	2
(Australia) 2023	Did not participate				Did not qualify			
(China) 2025	Did not participate				Did not qualify			
(Philippines) 2027	Did not participate				Did not qualify			
Total		6	2	4		4	2	2

=== West Asian Championship ===
Year	Position	Pld	W	L
(Jordan) 2019	Runners-up	4	2	2
Total		4	2	2

=== Asian Games ===
- yet to qualify

=== Mediterranean Games ===
Year	Position	Pld	W	L
(Syria) 1987	3rd place	–	–	–
(Greece) 1991	Did not participate			
(France) 1993	Did not participate			
(Italy) 1997	Did not participate			
(Tunisia) 2001	Did not participate			
(Spain) 2005	Did not participate			
(Italy) 2009	Did not participate			
(Turkey) 2013	Cancelled			
(Spain) 2018	Not part of the programme			
(Algeria) 2022	Not part of the programme			
Total		-	-	-

- Syria's team came third in 1987 Mediterranean Games which was hosted in Latakia, Syria.
- At the 2013 Mediterranean Games the women's basketball tournament was cancelled because too few teams applied for the competition which was mainly due to coinciding dates with EuroBasket 2013.

=== Arab Championship ===
Year	Position	Pld	W	L
(Jordan) 1983	Did not participate			
(Egypt) 1986	Not held (the number was not complete)			
(Egypt) 1987	Did not participate			
(Syria) 1989	2nd place	–	–	–
(Syria) 1992	3rd place	–	–	–
(Jordan) 1994	4th place	–	–	–
(Lebanon) 1997	Did not participate			
(Jordan) 1999	3rd place	–	–	–
(Algeria) 2000	Did not participate			
(Jordan) 2003	4th place	–	–	–
(Qatar) 2011	Withdrew			
(Egypt) 2017	Did not participate			
Total		-	-	-

=== Pan Arab Games ===
Year	Position	Pld	W	L
(Morocco) 1985	3rd place	–	–	–
(Syria) 1992	3rd place	–	–	–
(Lebanon) 1997	Did not participate			
(Jordan) 1999	4th place	–	–	–
(Algeria) 2004	Did not participate			
(Egypt) 2007	Not held women's tournament			
(Qatar) 2011	Withdrew			
Total		-	-	-

== Current squad ==
Current roster for the 2021 FIBA Women's Asia Cup Division B.

Syria women's national basketball team roster
Players
Coaches

Pos.	No.	Name	Age – Date of birth	Height	Club	Ctr.
G	1	Jehan Mamlouk	28 – 10 January 1993	1.60 m (5 ft 3 in)	Al Wahda	(Syria)
SG	3	Jessica Hakimeh	26 – 13 July 1995	1.67 m (5 ft 6 in)	Al-Thawra	(Syria)
SF	4	Alicia Magarian	30 – 22 March 1991	1.75 m (5 ft 9 in)	Al-Thawra	(Syria)
PG	5	Marya Daibess	31 – 5 August 1990	1.67 m (5 ft 6 in)	Al-Thawra	(Syria)
SG	6	Cedra Sulaiman	23 – 14 February 1998	1.72 m (5 ft 8 in)	Al-Thawra	(Syria)
PF	7	Noura Bshara	21 – 1 January 2000	1.79 m (5 ft 10 in)	Al Thawra	(Syria)
C	10	Johna Mbayed	25 – 19 March 1996	1.83 m (6 ft 0 in)	Jalaa SC	(Syria)
PF	12	Rasha Skran	34 – 20 May 1987	1.79 m (5 ft 10 in)	Al Wahda	(Syria)
C	15	Sana Chalabi	29 – 10 September 1992	1.83 m (6 ft 0 in)
G	22	Randi Keonsha Brown	25 – 13 May 1996	1.75 m (5 ft 9 in)	Giannina	(Greece)
SF	66	Minerva Ajjan	24 – 16 September 1997	1.70 m (5 ft 7 in)
PF	88	Anna Aghnanian Aslanian	20 – 8 January 2001	1.80 m (5 ft 11 in)	Les Foxes	(Armenia)

Head coach

- (Syria) Somar Khoury

Assistant coach(es)

- (Syria) Ayman Suleiman

Legend

- Club – describes last
  club before the tournament
- Age – describes age
  on 7 November 2021

== Notable players ==
- SWBL Multiple Champion
  - Jehan Mamlouk – 8 titles

== Kit ==
=== Sponsor ===
2021 – present: Cham Wings

== See also ==
- Syria women's national under-18 basketball team
- Syria women's national under-17 basketball team
- Syria women's national 3x3 team
