= Iraqi Basketball Association =

- Abbreviation: IBA
- Formation: 1948; 78 years ago
- Location: Baghdad, Iraq
- Affiliations: FIBA; FIBA Asia; Iraqi Olympic Committee
- Website: https://www.iraq.basketball/

The Iraqi Basketball Association (IBA) is the governing body of basketball in Iraq.

The association founded in 1948, represents basketball with public authorities as well as with national and international sports organizations and as such with Iraq in international competitions. It is affiliated with FIBA and FIBA Asia. The association also organizes the Iraq men's national basketball team and the Iraq women's national basketball team.

== Leagues ==
- Iraqi Professional Basketball League
