= Hu Xiaotao =

Chinese basketball player

Hu Xiaotao (simplified Chinese: 胡晓桃; traditional Chinese: 胡曉桃; pinyin: Hú Xiǎotáo; born June 30, 1981, in Jinzhou, Liaoning) is a female Chinese basketball player. She was part of the team that won the gold medal at the ABC Championship for Women 2001. She was also the MVP of the ABC Championship for Women 2001.
