= 2021 FIBA Women's Asia Cup =

29th edition of the FIBA Women's Asia Cup

29th Asian Women's Basketball Championship

Tournament details
- Host country: Jordan
- City: Amman
- Dates: 27 September – 3 October (Division A); 7–13 November (Division B)
- Teams: 14 (from 1 confederation)
- Venue: 1 (in 1 host city)

Final positions
- Champions: Japan (6th title)
- Runners-up: China
- Third place: Australia
- Fourth place: South Korea

Tournament statistics
- Games played: 20
- Attendance: 1,734 (87 per game)
- MVP: (Japan) Himawari Akaho
- Top scorer: (Australia) Sami Whitcomb (17.5 ppg)

Official website
- FIBA Women's Asia Cup 2021 - Division A FIBA Women's Asia Cup 2021 - Division B

The 2021 FIBA Women's Asia Cup Division A was the 29th edition of the tournament, held from 27 September to 3 October 2021 in Amman, Jordan. The tournament was originally set to be hosted by India. It served as the Asian and Oceanian qualification for the 2022 FIBA Women's Basketball World Cup in Australia, where the top four teams qualified for one of the qualifying tournaments.

Japan won their sixth title after beating China in the final. Australia captured the bronze medal by defeating South Korea.

The Division B tournament will be held also in the same venue from 7 to 13 November, with 6 teams participating, including the host country.

== Venue ==
Amman	2021 FIBA Women's Asia Cup is located in Jordan
Prince Hamza Stadium	2021 FIBA Women's Asia Cup is located in Jordan
Capacity: 7,500	2021 FIBA Women's Asia Cup is located in Jordan

== Qualified teams ==
The same eight teams from the last edition qualified for this years' tournament, listed by their final position. Since no Division B tournament was held in the 2019 edition, the last finishing team was not relegated to this edition's Division B tournament.

For Division A:

- Semifinalists at the 2019 FIBA Women's Asia Cup:
  - Japan
  - China
  - Australia
  - South Korea
- 5th-8th Placers of the 2019 FIBA Women's Asia Cup:
  - New Zealand
  - Chinese Taipei
  - Philippines
  - India

For Division B:

- The host nation
  - Jordan
- Early registrants for the Division B slots from FIBA Asia:
  - Indonesia
  - Iran
  - Lebanon
  - Kazakhstan
  - Syria

== Division A ==
=== Preliminary round ===
All times are local (UTC+03:00).

==== Group A ====
Pos	Team	Pld	W	L	PF	PA	PD	Pts	Qualification
1	Japan	3	3	0	265	158	+107	6	Semifinals
2	South Korea	3	2	1	254	205	+49	5	Playoffs
3	New Zealand	3	1	2	228	196	+32	4	Playoffs
4	India	3	0	3	164	352	−188	3	Seventh place game

Source: FIBA
Rules for classification: 1) Points; 2) Head-to-head results; 3) Points difference; 4) Points scored.

27 September 2021
10:00

Boxscore

Japan	136–46	India
Scoring by quarter: 41–14, 25–11, 38–14, 32–7
Pts: Miyashita 27; Rebs: Nagata 6 Asts: Miyazaki 12		Pts: P. Kumar 11; Rebs: P. Kumar 8 Asts: Limaye 4

Prince Hamza Hall, Amman
Attendance: 156
Referees: Glenn Cornelio (PHI), Anan Daraghma (PLE), Yu Yijing (CHN)

27 September 2021
13:00

Boxscore

South Korea	85–69	New Zealand
Scoring by quarter: 24–20, 22–18, 26–21, 13–10
Pts: Choi 29; Rebs: Park H. 11; Asts: Park H. 6		Pts: Davidson 21; Rebs: Davidson 11; Asts: Karaitiana, Paalvast 4

Prince Hamza Hall, Amman
Attendance: 135
Referees: Rabah Noujaim (LBN), Wissam Zein (SYR), Mohammad Fawzi Taha (JOR)

28 September 2021
10:00

Boxscore

New Zealand	50–62	Japan
Scoring by quarter: 20–13, 11–19, 11–15, 8–15
Pts: K. Leger-Walker 9 Rebs: Davidson 6 Asts: C. Leger-Walker 5		Pts: Mawuli 15; Rebs: Nakada 8 Asts: Miyazaki 7

Prince Hamza Hall, Amman
Attendance: 0
Referees: Ahmed Al-Shuwaili (IRQ), Mohammad Al-Amiri (KUW), Glenn Cornelio (PHI)

28 September 2021
13:00

Boxscore

India	69–107	South Korea
Scoring by quarter: 20–26, 15–25, 7–33, 27–23
Pts: Limaye 16; Rebs: Udayakumar 12; Asts: Masilamani 6		Pts: Kang 18; Rebs: Park J., Yang 6 Asts: An 14

Prince Hamza Hall, Amman
Attendance: 100
Referees: Mohammed Al-Tarawneh (JOR), Claude Abi Gebrayel (LBN), Tien Hsiao-Lun (TPE)

29 September 2021
10:00

Boxscore

Japan	67–62	South Korea
Scoring by quarter: 24–18, 13–18, 6–12, 24–14
Pts: Miyazaki, Akaho 18; Rebs: Miyazaki, Akaho 7 Asts: Miyazaki 9		Pts: Choi 16; Rebs: Kim D. 7 Asts: An 7

Prince Hamza Hall, Amman
Attendance: 0
Referees: Rabah Noujaim (LBN), Yu Yijing (CHN), Wissam Zein (SYR)

29 September 2021
13:00

Boxscore

New Zealand	109–49	India
Scoring by quarter: 28–14, 22–13, 23–7, 36–15
Pts: Davidson 18; Rebs: Davidson 11; Asts: Hippolite 7		Pts: Arvind 12; Rebs: S. Senthil, Pattemane 6 Asts: Limaye, Masilamani 3

Prince Hamza Hall, Amman
Attendance: 0
Referees: Glenn Cornelio (PHI), Tien Hsiao-Lun (TPE), Anan Daraghma (PLE)

==== Group B ====
Pos	Team	Pld	W	L	PF	PA	PD	Pts	Qualification
1	China	3	3	0	349	166	+183	6	Semifinals
2	Australia	3	2	1	260	203	+57	5	Playoffs
3	Chinese Taipei	3	1	2	208	252	−44	4	Playoffs
4	Philippines	3	0	3	160	356	−196	3	Seventh place game

Source: FIBA
Rules for classification: 1) Points; 2) Head-to-head results; 3) Points difference; 4) Points scored.

27 September 2021
16:00

Boxscore

China	143–52	Philippines
Scoring by quarter: 35–17, 34–12, 39–9, 35–14
Pts: Yang L. 21; Rebs: Wang 7 Asts: Wang, Zhang 7		Pts: Bernardino 17; Rebs: Bernardino 7 Asts: Bernardino 2

Prince Hamza Hall, Amman
Attendance: 0
Referees: Mohammad Al-Amiri (KUW), Claude Abi Gebrael (LBN), Yana Nikogossyan (KAZ)

27 September 2021
19:00

Boxscore

Australia	76–65	Chinese Taipei
Scoring by quarter: 19–16, 14–18, 20–11, 23–20
Pts: Garbin 15; Rebs: Sharp 10; Asts: Whitcomb 11		Pts: Lin Y. 12; Rebs: Lin T. 11; Asts: Lin Y. 7

Prince Hamza Hall, Amman
Attendance: 0
Referees: Ahmed Al-Shuwaili (IRQ), Kim Bo-hui (KOR), Daigo Urushima (JPN)

28 September 2021
16:00

Boxscore

Chinese Taipei	50–124	China
Scoring by quarter: 12–29, 10–30, 10–37, 18–28
Pts: Peng 15; Rebs: Cheng, Peng 3 Asts: Liu 3		Pts: Li Yue. 20; Rebs: Li Yue. 6 Asts: Li Yua. 8

Prince Hamza Hall, Amman
Attendance: 35
Referees: Rabah Noujaim (LBN), Saif Al-Dossari (QAT), Daigo Urushima (JPN)

28 September 2021
19:00

Boxscore

Philippines	56–120	Australia
Scoring by quarter: 20–32, 13–32, 13–27, 10–29
Pts: Pontejos 13; Rebs: Castro 6 Asts: Nabalan 3		Pts: Froling, Nicholson 21; Rebs: Froling 12; Asts: Whitcomb 7

Prince Hamza Hall, Amman
Attendance: 125
Referees: Wissam Zein (SYR), Mohammad Fawzi Taha (JOR), Rakesh Ramalingaiah (IND)

29 September 2021
16:00

Boxscore

China	82–64	Australia
Scoring by quarter: 25–19, 15–20, 18–10, 24–15
Pts: Han 16; Rebs: Han 11; Asts: Wang 5		Pts: Whitcomb 24; Rebs: Whitcomb 7 Asts: Whitcomb 5

Prince Hamza Hall, Amman
Attendance: 124
Referees: Ahmed Al-Shuwaili (IRQ), Yana Nikogossyan (KAZ), Saif Al-Dossari (QAT)

29 September 2021
19:00

Boxscore

Chinese Taipei	93–52	Philippines
Scoring by quarter: 26–15, 19–15, 31–11, 17–11
Pts: Lin W. 19; Rebs: Cheng 7 Asts: Lin H. 7		Pts: Bernardino 24; Rebs: Bernardino 14; Asts: Bernardino 3

Prince Hamza Hall, Amman
Attendance: 0
Referees: Mohammad Al-Amiri (KUW), Kim Bo-hui (KOR), Mohammad Fawzi Taha (JOR)

=== Knockout round ===
==== Bracket ====
Qualification to Semi-finals
30 September
Australia	72
New Zealand	61
30 September
South Korea	80
Chinese Taipei	74

Semi-finals
2 October
Japan	67
Australia	65
2 October
China	93
South Korea	69

Final
3 October
Japan	78
China	73
Third place
3 October
Australia	88
South Korea	58

==== Playoffs ====
30 September 2021
13:00

Boxscore

South Korea	80–74	Chinese Taipei
Scoring by quarter: 24–16, 21–20, 12–21, 23–17
Pts: Park H. 22; Rebs: Choi 8 Asts: Kim D. 5		Pts: Peng 18; Rebs: Cheng 7 Asts: Lin Y. 4

Prince Hamza Hall, Amman
Attendance: 168
Referees: Glenn Cornelio (PHI), Yana Nikogossyan (KAZ), Claude Abi Gebrayel (LBN)

30 September 2021
16:00

Boxscore

Australia	72–61	New Zealand
Scoring by quarter: 20–20, 20–14, 14–11, 18–16
Pts: Whitcomb 29; Rebs: Aokuso, Whitcomb 7 Asts: Whitcomb 6		Pts: C. Leger-Walker 17; Rebs: three players 5 Asts: K. Leger-Walker 6

Prince Hamza Hall, Amman
Attendance: 33
Referees: Rabah Noujaim (LBN), Mohammad Al-Amiri (KUW), Saif Al-Dossari (QAT)

==== Semifinals ====
As Australia, host of the 2022 FIBA Women's Basketball World Cup, made it to the semifinals, all four teams qualify to the 2022 FIBA Women's Basketball World Cup Qualifying Tournament.

2 October 2021
12:00

Boxscore

China	93–69	South Korea
Scoring by quarter: 23–9, 27–16, 22–18, 21–26
Pts: Li Yue. 20; Rebs: Li Yue. 12; Asts: Wang 8		Pts: Yang 12; Rebs: Park J. 5 Asts: Park J. 6

Prince Hamza Hall, Amman
Attendance: 100
Referees: Ahmed Al-Shuwaili (IRQ), Yana Nikogossyan (KAZ), Wissam Zein (SYR)

2 October 2021
15:00

Boxscore

Japan	67–65	Australia
Scoring by quarter: 20–12, 11–24, 22–19, 14–10
Pts: Hayashi 17; Rebs: Hayashi 7 Asts: Miyazaki 9		Pts: Whitcomb 16; Rebs: Scherf 15; Asts: Whitcomb 8

Prince Hamza Hall, Amman
Attendance: 123
Referees: Rabah Noujaim (LBN), Mohammad Fawzi Taha (JOR), Glenn Cornelio (PHI)

==== Seventh place game ====
This was also a relegation playoff, with the winner retaining Division A status, while the loser relegated to Division B.

30 September 2021
19:00

Boxscore

India	70–74	Philippines
Scoring by quarter: 19–13, 20–21, 13–21, 18–19
Pts: P. Senthil 15; Rebs: Limaye 13; Asts: Masilamani 7		Pts: Castillo, Pontejos 22; Rebs: Bernardino 11; Asts: Bernardino 7

Prince Hamza Hall, Amman
Attendance: 125
Referees: Ahmed Al-Shuwaili (IRQ), Daigo Urushima (JPN), Yu Yijing (CHN)

==== Fifth place game ====
2 October 2021
18:00

Boxscore

Chinese Taipei	59–74	New Zealand
Scoring by quarter: 16–16, 13–22, 15–18, 15–18
Pts: Chen 12; Rebs: Chen, Lin Y. 12; Asts: Lin Y., Han 4		Pts: Davidson 26; Rebs: Purcell 10; Asts: K. Leger-Walker 5

Prince Hamza Hall, Amman
Attendance: 34
Referees: Kim Bo-hui (KOR), Mohammed Al-Tarawneh (JOR), Rakesh Ramalingaiah (IND)

==== Third place game ====
3 October 2021
12:00

Boxscore

Australia	88–58	South Korea
Scoring by quarter: 24–22, 23–10, 19–12, 22–14
Pts: Whitcomb 15; Rebs: Whitcomb 9 Asts: Whitcomb 8		Pts: Park J. 17; Rebs: Park J. 6 Asts: Kim D., Park H. 4

Prince Hamza Hall, Amman
Attendance: 0
Referees: Saif Al-Dossari (QAT), Glenn Cornelio (PHI), Daigo Urushima (JPN)

==== Final ====
3 October 2021
15:00

Boxscore

Japan	78–73	China
Scoring by quarter: 19–21, 17–18, 16–18, 26–16
Pts: Miyazaki 26; Rebs: Akaho 8 Asts: Miyazaki 11		Pts: Huang 18; Rebs: Li Yue. 11; Asts: Yang 7

Prince Hamza Hall, Amman
Attendance: 476
Referees: Rabah Noujaim (LBN), Mohammad Al-Amiri (KUW), Yana Nikogossyan (KAZ)

== Division B ==
All times are local (UTC+02:00)

=== Preliminary round ===
==== Group A ====
Pos	Team	Pld	W	L	PF	PA	PD	Pts	Qualification
1	Lebanon	2	2	0	149	127	+22	4	Semifinals
2	Syria	2	1	1	141	154	−13	3	Playoffs
3	Iran	2	0	2	135	144	−9	2	Playoffs

Updated to match(es) played on 8 November 2021. Source: FIBA
Rules for classification: 1) Points; 2) Head-to-head results; 3) Points difference; 4) Points scored

7 November 2021
16:00

Boxscore

Lebanon	66–64	Iran
Scoring by quarter: 21–21, 16–19, 14–11, 15–13
Pts: Bakhos 17; Rebs: Denson, Mokdad 7 Asts: Akl 12		Pts: Vakili 16; Rebs: Eissaian 13; Asts: Abdolvand 7

Prince Hamza Hall, Amman
Referees: Mohammad Fawzi Taha (JOR), Yana Nikogossyan (KAZ), Rendra Lesmana (INA)

8 November 2021
16:00

Boxscore

Iran	71–78	Syria
Scoring by quarter: 13–22, 17–21, 15–25, 26–10
Pts: Shojaei 18; Rebs: Eissaian 12; Asts: Abdolvand, Rasoulipour 4		Pts: Brown 26; Rebs: Brown, Skran 7 Asts: Daibess 4

Prince Hamza Hall, Amman
Referees: Mohammad Fawzi Taha (JOR), Yana Nikogossyan (KAZ), Ibrahim Jerrar (JOR)

9 November 2021
16:00

Boxscore

Syria	63–83	Lebanon
Scoring by quarter: 17–21, 12–28, 15–17, 19–17
Pts: Brown 18; Rebs: Mbayed 7 Asts: three players 2		Pts: Akl 22; Rebs: Akl 13; Asts: Akl 5

Prince Hamza Hall, Amman
Referees: Mohammad Fawzi Taha (JOR), Yana Nikogossyan (KAZ), Rendra Lesmana (INA)

==== Group B ====
Pos	Team	Pld	W	L	PF	PA	PD	Pts	Qualification
1	Jordan (H)	2	2	0	148	115	+33	4	Semifinals
2	Indonesia	2	1	1	143	145	−2	3	Playoffs
3	Kazakhstan	2	0	2	120	151	−31	2	Playoffs

Updated to match(es) played on 8 November 2021. Source: FIBA
Rules for classification: 1) Points; 2) Head-to-head results; 3) Points difference; 4) Points scored
(H) Hosts

7 November 2021
19:00

Boxscore

Kazakhstan	69–79	Indonesia
Scoring by quarter: 14–24, 17–23, 18–17, 20–15
Pts: Kurazova 26; Rebs: Kurazova, Koroleva 8 Asts: Alishauskaite 5		Pts: Pierre-Louis 31; Rebs: Pierre-Louis 15; Asts: Retong 10

Prince Hamza Hall, Amman
Referees: Mohammad Alamiri (KUW), Alia Alyassin (SYR), Richard El Hajj (LIB)

8 November 2021
19:00

Boxscore

Indonesia	64–76	Jordan
Scoring by quarter: 27–23, 12–17, 13–16, 12–20
Pts: Dewi 17; Rebs: Pierre-Louis 9 Asts: Retong 7		Pts: Cloud, Al Hinn 19; Rebs: Cloud 7 Asts: Cloud 9

Prince Hamza Hall, Amman
Referees: Mohammad Alamiri (KUW), Richard El Hajj (LIB), Samaneh Dehghani (IRI)

9 November 2021
19:00

Boxscore

Jordan	72–51	Kazakhstan
Scoring by quarter: 27–14, 17–11, 20–12, 8–14
Pts: Abdo 15; Rebs: Cloud 6 Asts: Cloud 7		Pts: Koroleva 12; Rebs: Kurazova, Astapenko 4 Asts: Kurazova 4

Prince Hamza Hall, Amman
Referees: Mohammad Alamiri (KUW), Alia Alyassin (SYR), Richard El Hajj (LIB)

=== Knockout round ===
==== Bracket ====
Qualification to Semi-finals
10 November
Indonesia	76
Iran	68
10 November
Syria	69
Kazakhstan	87

Semi-finals
12 November
Lebanon	76
Indonesia	62
12 November
Jordan	61
Kazakhstan	56

Final
13 November
Lebanon	80
Jordan	40
Third place
13 November
Indonesia	79
Kazakhstan	55

==== Playoffs ====
10 November 2021
16:00

Boxscore

Syria	69–87	Kazakhstan
Scoring by quarter: 13–21, 19–22, 11–18, 26–26
Pts: Sulaiman 22; Rebs: Aghnanian Aslanian 6 Asts: 4 players 2		Pts: Yagodkina 30; Rebs: Kurazova 11; Asts: Yagodkina 7

Prince Hamza Hall, Amman
Referees: Richard El Hajj (LIB), Samaneh Dehghani (IRI), Rendra Lesmana (INA)

10 November 2021
19:00

Boxscore

Indonesia	76–68	Iran
Scoring by quarter: 10–12, 28–13, 20–29, 18–14
Pts: Pierre-Louis 19; Rebs: Pierre-Louis 11; Asts: Retong 7		Pts: Abdolvand 17; Rebs: Esmaeilzadeh 6 Asts: Abdolvand 7

Prince Hamza Hall, Amman
Referees: Mohammad Alamiri (KUW), Yana Nikogossyan (KAZ), Ibrahim Jerrar (JOR)

==== Fifth place game ====
12 November 2021
13:00

Boxscore

Syria	63–58	Iran
Scoring by quarter: 7–17, 16–13, 23–14, 17–14
Pts: Brown 20; Rebs: Brown 14; Asts: Sulaiman, Skran 4		Pts: Shojaei 16; Rebs: Vakili 9 Asts: Abdolvand 4

Prince Hamza Hall, Amman
Referees: Mohammad Alamiri (KUW), Ibrahim Jerrar (JOR), Rendra Lesmana (INA)

==== Semifinals ====
12 November 2021
16:00

Boxscore

Lebanon	76–62	Indonesia
Scoring by quarter: 16–18, 19–18, 18–12, 23–14
Pts: Akl 19; Rebs: Denson 7 Asts: Mokdad 4		Pts: Sophia 16; Rebs: Sophia 9 Asts: Retong 5

Prince Hamza Hall, Amman
Referees: Mohammad Fawzi Taha (JOR), Yana Nikogossyan (KAZ), Samaneh Dehghani (IRI)

12 November 2021
19:00

Boxscore

Jordan	61–56	Kazakhstan
Scoring by quarter: 20–14, 8–12, 18–15, 15–15
Pts: Cloud 25; Rebs: Al Hinn 11; Asts: Cloud 7		Pts: Yagodkina 19; Rebs: Yagodkina 10; Asts: Kurazova, 11

Prince Hamza Hall, Amman
Referees: Mohammad Alamiri (KUW), Alia Alyassin (SYR), Richard El Hajj (LIB)

==== Third place game ====
13 November 2021
16:00

Boxscore

Indonesia	79–55	Kazakhstan
Scoring by quarter: 20–10, 18–19, 25–16, 16–10
Pts: Pierre-Louis 23; Rebs: Pierre-Louis 10; Asts: Sophia 6		Pts: Tutkishova 11; Rebs: Tutkishova, Otegenova 8 Asts: Beschastnova 4

Prince Hamza Hall, Amman
Referees: Richard El Hajj (LIB), Mohammad Fawzi Taha (JOR), Ibrahim Jerrar (JOR)

==== Final ====
This is also a promotion playoff, with the loser retaining Division B status, while the winner promoted to Division A.

13 November 2021
19:00

Boxscore

Lebanon	80–40	Jordan
Scoring by quarter: 26–5, 14–14, 31–6, 9–15
Pts: Akl 22; Rebs: Bakhos 9 Asts: Akl 6		Pts: Haddad 25; Rebs: Fadda 12; Asts: Cloud 6

Prince Hamza Hall, Amman
Referees: Mohammad Alamiri (KUW), Yana Nikogossyan (KAZ), Samaneh Dehghani (IRI)

== Final standings ==
=== Division A ===
Qualified to the 2022 FIBA Women's Basketball World Cup Qualifying Tournament
Qualified to the 2022 FIBA Women's Basketball World Cup as the host nation
Relegated to Division B of the 2023 FIBA Women's Asia Cup

Rank	Team	Record
1st place, gold medalist(s)	Japan	5–0
2nd place, silver medalist(s)	China	4–1
3rd place, bronze medalist(s)	Australia	4–2
4	South Korea	3–3
5	New Zealand	2–3
6	Chinese Taipei	1–4
7	Philippines	1–3
8	India	0–4

=== Division B ===
Promoted to Division A of the 2023 FIBA Women's Asia Cup

Rank	Team	Record
1st place, gold medalist(s)	Lebanon	4–0
2nd place, silver medalist(s)	Jordan	3–1
3rd place, bronze medalist(s)	Indonesia	3–2
4	Kazakhstan	1–4
5	Syria	2–2
6	Iran	0–4

== Statistics and awards ==
=== Statistical leaders ===
==== Players ====
Points

Name	PPG
(Australia) Sami Whitcomb	17.5
(China) Li Yueru	15.6
(New Zealand) Penina Davidson	15.4
(Philippines) Afril Bernardino	14.5
(South Korea) Park Hye-jin	14.2

Rebounds

Name	RPG
(Philippines) Afril Bernardino	8.8
(New Zealand) Penina Davidson	8.0
(Australia) Lauren Scherf	7.7
(India) Pushpa Senthil	7.5
(China) Li Yueru	7.4

Assists

Name	APG
(Japan) Saori Miyazaki	9.6
(Australia) Sami Whitcomb	7.5
(South Korea) An He-ji	5.6
(China) Li Yuan	5.0
(China) Yang Liwei	4.8
(India) Nishanthi Masilamani	4.8

Blocks

Name	BPG
(Philippines) Afril Bernardino	1.8
(Australia) Lauren Scherf	1.7
(China) Li Yueru	1.4
(China) Huang Sijing	1.2
(Japan) Stephanie Mawuli	1.2
(South Korea) Jin An	1.2
(South Korea) Kim Dan-bi	1.2

Steals

Name	SPG
(Japan) Himawari Akaho	2.2
(Japan) Stephanie Mawuli	2.2
(Philippines) Afril Bernardino	2.0
(China) Huang Sijing	1.8
(New Zealand) Kalani Purcell	1.8

Efficiency

Name	EFFPG
(Australia) Sami Whitcomb	23.7
(China) Li Yueru	22.2
(China) Huang Sijing	22.0
(Philippines) Afril Bernardino	19.8
(Japan) Saori Miyazaki	19.2
(New Zealand) Penina Davidson	19.2

==== Teams ====
Points

Team	PPG
China	103.0
Japan	82.0
Australia	80.8
South Korea	76.8
New Zealand	72.6

Rebounds

Team	RPG
Australia	48.0
China	48.0
New Zealand	42.6
India	41.3
South Korea	36.2

Assists

Team	APG
China	35.2
South Korea	25.7
Japan	23.6
New Zealand	22.4
Australia	21.5

Blocks

Team	BPG
China	4.2
South Korea	4.2
Australia	3.7
New Zealand	3.0
Philippines	3.0

Steals

Team	SPG
Japan	11.8
China	8.8
Chinese Taipei	6.8
Australia	6.7
South Korea	6.0

Efficiency

Team	EFFPG
China	148.0
Japan	99.8
Australia	97.8
South Korea	91.0
New Zealand	88.4

=== Awards ===
The awards were announced on 3 October 2021.

All-Star team
Guards	Forwards	Center
(Australia) Sami Whitcomb (Japan) Saori Miyazaki	(China) Huang Sijing (Japan) Himawari Akaho	(China) Li Yueru
MVP: (Japan) Himawari Akaho

== See also ==
- 2021 FIBA Asia Cup
- 2022 FIBA Women's Basketball World Cup
