= Syrian Basketball Federation =

Governing body for basketball in Syria

- Abbreviation: SBF
- Formation: 1947; 79 years ago
- Location: Damascus, Syria
- President: Tarif Koutrach
- Secretary General: Danial Zou Al Kefel
- Affiliations: FIBA; FIBA Asia; WABA; Syrian Olympic Committee
- Website: http://www.syrbf.org

The Syrian Basketball Federation is the governing body of basketball in Syria. It organizes national professional championships men, women and youth, while it is also responsible for holding the cup of the country. It also coordinates the Syria men's national basketball team and the Syria women's national basketball team.

The federation founded in 1947, represents basketball with public authorities as well as with national and international sports organizations and as such with Syria in international competitions. It is affiliated with FIBA and FIBA Asia.

As of early December 2021, the president has been Taríf Koutrach.

== Leagues ==
- Syrian Basketball League
- Syrian Basketball Cup
- Syrian Basketball Super Cup
- Syrian Basketball Women League
- Syrian Basketball Women Cup

== National teams ==
- Men's (Senior, U-19, U-17)
- Women's (Senior, U-19, U-17)
