= Tunisia women's national basketball team =

Women's national basketball team representing Tunisia

Tunisia
- FIBA ranking: 102 (14 September 2026)
- Joined FIBA: 1956
- FIBA zone: FIBA Africa
- National federation: FTBB
- Coach: Ricardo González Dávila
- Nickname(s): نسور قرطاج (Eagles of Carthage)

World Cup
- Appearances: 1

AfroBasket
- Appearances: 12
- Medals: Silver (silver) (1974, 2000)

African Games
- Appearances: 2

Pan Arab Games
- Appearances: 4
- Medals: Gold (gold) (1999); Silver (silver) (1992, 1997, 2004)
Home	Away
Medal record
Event	1st	2nd	3rd
FIBA AfroBasket	0	2	0
Arab Championship	2	5	0
Pan Arab Games	1	3	0
Jeux de la Francophonie	0	0	2
Total	3	10	2

Tunisia women's national basketball team (Arabic: منتخب تونس لكرة السلة للسيدات), nicknamed Les Aigles de Carthage (The Eagles of Carthage or The Carthage Eagles), is the nationally controlled basketball team representing Tunisia at world basketball competitions for women. It is administered by the Tunisia Basketball Federation (FTBB). (Arabic: الجامعة التونسية لكرة السلة)

In 2007, they were the third highest ranked African team in the world after Senegal and Nigeria.

== Tournament record ==
=== Summer Olympics ===
Summer Olympics
Appearances : None
Year	Position	Tournament
From (Canada) 1976 To (Japan) 2020	–	Did not qualify

=== World Championship ===
FIBA World Championship
Appearances : 1
Year	Position	Tournament	Host
(China) 2002	16th	2002 FIBA World Championship	in 9 host cities

=== AfroBasket ===
Champions Runners-up Third place Fourth place

- Red border color indicates tournament was held on home soil.

AfroBasket Women
Appearances : 12
Year	Position	Tournament	Host
(Guinea) 1966	–	1966 FIBA Africa Championship	Conakry, Guinea
(Egypt) 1968	–	1968 FIBA Africa Championship	Cairo, United Arab Republic
(Togo) 1970	–	1970 FIBA Africa ChampionshipTogo	Lomé, Togo
(Tunisia) 1974	2nd place, silver medalist(s)	1974 FIBA Africa Championship	Tunis, Tunisia
(Senegal) 1977	5	1977 FIBA Africa Championship	Dakar, Senegal
(Somalia) 1979	–	1979 FIBA Africa Championship	Mogadishu, Somalia
(Senegal) 1981	6	1981 FIBA Africa Championship	Dakar, Senegal
(Angola) 1983	–	1983 FIBA Africa Championship	Luanda, Angola
(Senegal) 1984	–	1984 FIBA Africa Championship	Dakar, Senegal
(Mozambique) 1986	–	1986 FIBA Africa Championship	Maputo, Mozambique
(Tunisia) 1990	4	1990 FIBA Africa Championship	Tunis, Tunisia
(Senegal) 1993	–	1993 FIBA Africa Championship	Dakar, Senegal
(South Africa) 1994	–	1994 FIBA Africa Championship	Johannesburg, South Africa
(Kenya) 1997	–	1997 FIBA Africa Championship	Nairobi, Kenya
(Tunisia) 2000	2nd place, silver medalist(s)	2000 FIBA Africa Championship	Tunis, Tunisia
(Mozambique) 2003	6	2003 FIBA Africa Championship	Maputo, Mozambique
(Nigeria) 2005	–	2005 FIBA Africa Championship	Abuja, Nigeria
(Senegal) 2007	11	2007 FIBA Africa Championship	Dakar, Senegal
(Madagascar) 2009	10	2009 FIBA Africa Championship	Antananarivo, Madagascar
(Mali) 2011	10	2011 FIBA Africa Championship	Bamako, Mali
(Mozambique) 2013	–	2013 FIBA Africa Championship	Maputo, Mozambique
(Cameroon) 2015	–	2015 FIBA Africa Championship	Yaoundé, Cameroon
(Mali) 2017	11	2017 FIBA Africa Championship	Bamako, Mali
(Senegal) 2019	12	2019 FIBA Africa Championship	Dakar, Senegal
(Cameroon) 2021	11	2021 FIBA Africa Championship	Yaoundé, Cameroon

=== African Games ===
African Games
Appearances : 2
Year	Position	Tournament	Host
(Republic of the Congo) 1965	–	1965 African Games	Brazzaville, Congo
(Nigeria) 1973	–	1973 African Games	Lagos, Nigeria
(Algeria) 1978	–	1978 African Games	Algiers, Algeria
(Egypt) 1991	–	1991 African Games	Cairo, Egypt
(Zimbabwe) 1995	–	1995 African Games	Harare, Zimbabwe
(South Africa) 1999	4th	1999 African Games	Johannesburg, South Africa
(Nigeria) 2003	–	2003 African Games	Abuja, Nigeria
(Algeria) 2007	7th	2007 African Games	Algiers, Algeria
(Mozambique) 2011	–	2011 African Games	Maputo, Mozambique
(Republic of the Congo) 2015	–	2015 African Games	Brazzaville, Congo

=== Arab Championship ===
Arab Championship
Appearances : 7
Year	Position	Tournament	Host
(Syria) 1989	1st place, gold medalist(s)	1989 Arab Championship	Damascus, Syria
(Syria) 1992	2nd place, silver medalist(s)	1992 Arab Championship	Damascus, Syria
(Egypt) 1994	2nd place, silver medalist(s)	1994 Arab Championship	Cairo, Egypt
(Lebanon) 1997	2nd place, silver medalist(s)	1997 Arab Championship	Beyrouth, Lebanon
(Jordan) 1999	1st place, gold medalist(s)	1999 Arab Championship	Amman, Jordan
(Jordan) 2003	2nd place, silver medalist(s)	2003 Arab Championship	Amman, Jordan
(Egypt) 2017	2nd place, silver medalist(s)	2017 Arab Championship	Cairo, Egypt

=== Pan Arab Games ===
Pan Arab Games
Appearances : 4
Year	Position	Tournament	Host
(Morocco) 1985	–	1985 Pan Arab Games	Rabat, Morocco
(Syria) 1992	2nd place, silver medalist(s)	1992 Pan Arab Games	Damascus, Syria
(Lebanon) 1997	2nd place, silver medalist(s)	1997 Pan Arab Games	Beirut, Lebanon
(Jordan) 1999	1st place, gold medalist(s)	1999 Pan Arab Games	Amman, Jordan
(Algeria) 2004	2nd place, silver medalist(s)	2004 Pan Arab Games	Algiers, Algeria
(Egypt) 2007	Not held women's tournament	2007 Pan Arab Games	Cairo, Egypt
(Qatar) 2011	Did not compete	2011 Pan Arab Games	Doha, Qatar

=== Mediterranean Games ===
Mediterranean Games
Appearances : 1
Year	Position	Tournament	Host
(Tunisia) 2001	8	2001 Mediterranean Games	Tunis, Tunisia

=== Jeux de la Francophonie ===
Jeux de la Francophonie
Appearances :
Year	Position	Tournament	Host
(Niger) 2005	3rd place, bronze medalist(s)	Jeux de la Francophonie 2005	Niamey, Niger
(Lebanon) 2009	3rd place, bronze medalist(s)	Jeux de la Francophonie 2009	Beirut, Lebanon

== Current roster ==
Roster for the 2021 Women's Afrobasket.

Tunisia women's national basketball team roster
Players
Coaches

Pos.	No.	Name	Age – Date of birth	Height	Club	Ctr.
PF	00	Rabeb Rebai	25 – 19 April 1996	1.87 m (6 ft 2 in)	Espoir Cap Bon	(Tunisia)
SF	3	Nadia Hamzaoui	23 – 27 November 1997	1.83 m (6 ft 0 in)	Ezzahra Sports	(Tunisia)
C	4	Rabeb Abidi	20 – 10 August 2001	1.85 m (6 ft 1 in)	CS Sfaxien	(Tunisia)
SG	6	Marwa Shili	21 – 14 December 1999	1.75 m (5 ft 9 in)	Étoile du Sahel	(Tunisia)
PF	7	Houda Hamrouni	27 – 7 February 1994	1.86 m (6 ft 1 in)	Espoir Cap Bon	(Tunisia)
G	8	Maroua Baccar	27 – 12 June 1994	1.76 m (5 ft 9 in)	CS Sfaxien	(Tunisia)
PG	11	Wafa Loubiri	26 – 18 June 1995	1.68 m (5 ft 6 in)	Étoile du Sahel	(Tunisia)
PF	12	Nour Nasri	17 – 14 February 2004	1.84 m (6 ft 0 in)	Sportif de Bizerte	(Tunisia)
G	13	Meriem Hamrouni	32 – 15 July 1989	1.75 m (5 ft 9 in)	Ezzahra Sports	(Tunisia)
C	23	Rania Laouini	25 – 3 June 1996	1.85 m (6 ft 1 in)	Club Sportif	(Tunisia)
PF	32	Mariem Trabelsi	20 – 11 January 2001	1.80 m (5 ft 11 in)	CS Sfaxien	(Tunisia)
SG	93	Meriam Mallat	28 – 1 January 1993	1.78 m (5 ft 10 in)	Club Sportif	(Tunisia)

Head coach

- (Spain) Ricardo González Dávila

Assistant coach(es)

- (Tunisia) Atef Maoua

Legend

- Club – describes last
  club before the tournament
- Age – describes age
  on 18 September 2021

== See also ==
- Tunisia women's national under-20 basketball team
- Tunisia women's national under-19 basketball team
- Tunisia women's national under-17 basketball team
- Tunisia women's national 3x3 team
