= 2001 ABC Championship for Women =

2001 FIBA Women's Asia Cup
19th Asian Women's Basketball Championship
- Official logo of the ABC Championship for Women 2001

Tournament details
- Host country: Thailand
- Dates: October 4–11
- Teams: 13 (from 44 federations)
- Venue: 1 (in 1 host city)

Final positions
- Champions: China (7th title)

Tournament statistics
- MVP: (China) Hu Xiatao

The 2001 ABC Championship for Women is the qualifying tournament for 2002 FIBA World Championship for Women. The tournament was held on Bangkok, Thailand from October 4 to October 11. The championship is divided into two levels: Level I and Level II.

== Participating teams ==
Level I	Level II – Group A	Level II – Group B
South Korea; Japan; Chinese Taipei; China; Thailand	Malaysia; India; Lebanon; Macau	Hong Kong; Sri Lanka; Kazakhstan; Uzbekistan

== Preliminary round ==
=== Level I ===
Team	Pld	W	L	PF	PA	PD	Pts	Tiebreaker
China	4	4	0	428	280	+148	8	
South Korea	4	2	2	324	307	+17	6	1–1 / 1.021
Japan	4	2	2	323	299	+24	6	1–1 / 0.994
Chinese Taipei	4	2	2	323	327	−4	6	1–1 / 0.987
Thailand	4	0	4	257	442	−185	4	

October 4
11:45

South Korea	80–73	Japan
Scoring by quarter: 17–26, 24–14, 17–16, 22–17

Hua Mark Indoor Stadium, Bangkok

October 4
18:45

Thailand	69–107	Chinese Taipei
Scoring by quarter: 16–33, 21–31, 17–21, 15–22

Hua Mark Indoor Stadium, Bangkok

October 5
12:45

China	100–64	South Korea
Scoring by quarter: 23–12, 16–8, 31–21, 30–23

Hua Mark Indoor Stadium, Bangkok

October 5
16:45

Japan	83–77	Chinese Taipei
Scoring by quarter: 16–26, 19–20, 18–15, 30–16

Hua Mark Indoor Stadium, Bangkok

October 6
14:45

Chinese Taipei	67–107	China
Scoring by quarter: 18–30, 22–27, 9–27, 18–23

Hua Mark Indoor Stadium, Bangkok

October 6
16:45

Japan	97–47	Thailand
Scoring by quarter: 19–12, 27–8, 27–15, 24–12

Hua Mark Indoor Stadium, Bangkok

October 7
12:45

Thailand	62–112	South Korea
Scoring by quarter: 11–31, 15–22, 23–32, 13–27

Hua Mark Indoor Stadium, Bangkok

October 7
16:45

China	95–70	Japan
Scoring by quarter: 22–15, 24–20, 31–14, 18–21

Hua Mark Indoor Stadium, Bangkok

October 8
12:45

South Korea	68–72	Chinese Taipei
Scoring by quarter: 22–20, 18–14, 14–19, 14–19

Hua Mark Indoor Stadium, Bangkok

October 8
16:45

China	126–79	Thailand
Scoring by quarter: 38–12, 16–21, 33–16, 39–30

Hua Mark Indoor Stadium, Bangkok

=== Level II – Group A ===
Team	Pld	W	L	PF	PA	PD	Pts
Malaysia	3	3	0	225	151	+74	6
India	3	2	1	299	192	+107	5
Lebanon	3	1	2	248	187	+61	4
Macau	3	0	3	83	325	−242	3

October 4
13:45

Macau	25–94	Lebanon
Scoring by quarter: 11–23, 7–25, 5–25, 2–21

Hua Mark Indoor Stadium, Bangkok

October 5
18:45

Malaysia	68–63	India
Scoring by quarter: 12–19, 20–17, 14–13, 22–14

Hua Mark Indoor Stadium, Bangkok

October 6
18:45

Macau	25–89	Malaysia
Scoring by quarter: 9–14, 5–24, 6–21, 5–30

Hua Mark Indoor Stadium, Bangkok

October 7
18:45

India	94–91	Lebanon
Scoring by quarter: 23–22, 30–23, 19–26, 22–20

Hua Mark Indoor Stadium, Bangkok

October 8
18:45

Lebanon	63–68	Malaysia
Scoring by quarter: 22–23, 11–16, 17–17, 13–12

Hua Mark Indoor Stadium, Bangkok

October 9
11:00

India	142–33	Macau
Scoring by quarter: 36–7, 37–7, 26–9, 43–10

Hua Mark Indoor Stadium, Bangkok

=== Level II – Group B ===
Team	Pld	W	L	PF	PA	PD	Pts
Kazakhstan	3	3	0	332	115	+217	6
Uzbekistan	3	2	1	262	191	+71	5
Hong Kong	3	1	2	179	229	−50	4
Sri Lanka	3	0	3	114	352	−238	3

October 4
15:45

Hong Kong	48–87	Uzbekistan
Scoring by quarter: 12–25, 12–25, 19–13, 5–24

Hua Mark Indoor Stadium, Bangkok

October 5
14:45

Kazakhstan	141–20	Sri Lanka
Scoring by quarter: 36–6, 33–5, 36–4, 36–5

Hua Mark Indoor Stadium, Bangkok

October 6
12:45

Sri Lanka	46–98	Hong Kong
Scoring by quarter: 16–25, 8–23, 16–22, 6–28

Hua Mark Indoor Stadium, Bangkok

October 7
14:45

Uzbekistan	62–95	Kazakhstan
Scoring by quarter: 15–18, 18–29, 16–18, 13–30

Hua Mark Indoor Stadium, Bangkok

October 8
14:45

Kazakhstan	96–33	Hong Kong
Scoring by quarter: 24–12, 26–15, 24–3, 22–3

Hua Mark Indoor Stadium, Bangkok

October 9
9:00

Sri Lanka	48–113	Uzbekistan
Scoring by quarter: 13–31, 12–33, 11–27, 12–22

Hua Mark Indoor Stadium, Bangkok

== Classification 10th–13th ==
=== 12th place ===
October 10
10:45

Macau	72–91	Sri Lanka
Scoring by quarter: 20–20, 22–20, 15–26, 15–25

Hua Mark Indoor Stadium, Bangkok

=== 10th place ===
October 11
10:45

Lebanon	0–20	Hong Kong
Walkover

Hua Mark Indoor Stadium, Bangkok

- Lebanon was penalized to the last place.

== Classification 6th–9th ==
Semifinals
October 10
Malaysia	75
Uzbekistan	91
October 10
India	66
Kazakhstan	119

6th place
October 11
Uzbekistan	54
Kazakhstan	88
8th place
October 11
Malaysia	77
India	87

=== Semifinals ===
October 10
12:45

Malaysia	75–91	Uzbekistan
Scoring by quarter: 32–25, 14–27, 13–21, 16–18

Hua Mark Indoor Stadium, Bangkok

October 10
14:45

India	66–119	Kazakhstan
Scoring by quarter: 18–30, 17–30, 12–30, 19–29

Hua Mark Indoor Stadium, Bangkok

=== 8th place ===
October 11
12:45

Malaysia	77–87	India
Scoring by quarter: 20–27, 19–25, 14–18, 24–17

Hua Mark Indoor Stadium, Bangkok

=== 6th place ===
October 11
14:45

Uzbekistan	54–88	Kazakhstan
Scoring by quarter: 10–21, 18–27, 15–21, 11–19

Hua Mark Indoor Stadium, Bangkok

== Final round ==
Semifinals
October 10
China	94
Chinese Taipei	68
October 10
South Korea	76
Japan	93

Final
October 11
China	105
Japan	76
3rd place
October 11
Chinese Taipei	63
South Korea	78

=== Semifinals ===
October 10
16:45

China	94–68	Chinese Taipei
Scoring by quarter: 28–12, 18–24, 17–11, 31–21

Hua Mark Indoor Stadium, Bangkok

October 10
18:45

South Korea	76–93	Japan
Scoring by quarter: 17–21, 21–16, 12–23, 26–33

Hua Mark Indoor Stadium, Bangkok

=== 3rd place ===
October 11
16:45

Chinese Taipei	63–78	South Korea
Scoring by quarter: 18–26, 15–20, 15–13, 15–19

Hua Mark Indoor Stadium, Bangkok

=== Final ===
October 11
18:45

China	105–76	Japan
Scoring by quarter: 21–21, 33–15, 27–18, 24–22
Pts: Chen N. 50; Rebs: Chen N. 11; Asts: Hu X.T. 7		Pts: Nagata 20; Rebs: Nagata 5 Asts: Nagata 3

Hua Mark Indoor Stadium, Bangkok

== Final standing ==
Qualified for the 2002 FIBA World Championship for Women

Rank	Team	Record
1st place, gold medalist(s)	China	6–0
2nd place, silver medalist(s)	Japan	3–3
3rd place, bronze medalist(s)	South Korea	3–3
4	Chinese Taipei	2–4
5	Thailand	0–4
6	Kazakhstan	5–0
7	Uzbekistan	3–2
8	India	3–2
9	Malaysia	3–2
10	Hong Kong	2–2
11	Sri Lanka	1–3
12	Macau	0–4
13	Lebanon	1–3

== Awards ==
2001 Asian champions

China
Seventh title

- Most Valuable Player: (China) Hu Xiatao
- Best Playmaker: (South Korea) Kim Ji-Yoon
- Best Rebounder: (Chinese Taipei) Cheng Hui-yun
- Best 3-Pointer: (Japan) Akemi Okazato
- Best Coach: (China) Gong Luming
