= Kuwait Basketball Association =

- Abbreviation: KBA
- Formation: 1957; 69 years ago
- Location: Kuwait City, Kuwait
- Affiliations: FIBA; FIBA Asia; Kuwait Olympic Committee

The Kuwait Basketball Association (Arabic: الاتحاد الكويتي لكرة السلة) is the governing body of basketball in Kuwait.

The association founded in 1957 (joined FIBA in 1959), represents basketball with public authorities as well as with national and international sports organizations and as such with Kuwait in international competitions. It is affiliated with FIBA and FIBA Asia. The association also organizes the Kuwait national basketball team and the Kuwait women's national basketball team.

== Leagues ==
- Kuwait Basketball League
