= Al-Thawra SC (women's basketball) =

- Nickname: Arabic: الثورة (The Revolution)
- Leagues: Syrian Women Basketball League
- Founded: 1946
- History: Al-Thawra Damascus; 1946–present
- Arena: Al-Fayhaa Arena (capacity: 6000)
- Location: Damascus, Syria
- Team colors: Blue and White
- Head coach: Abdullah Kammouneh
- 2020–21 position: Syrian League, 1st of 10
- Championships: (3) Syrian Women Basketball League (4) Syrian Basketball Cup
- Website: Official page
Home	Away

Al-Thawra SC is a major Syrian professional women's basketball club and department of Al Thawra Sports Club based in Damascus, Syria.

== Honours ==
- Syrian Women Basketball League
  - Winners (3): 2019 - 2021 - 2022
- Syrian Basketball Cup
  - Winners (4): 2019 - 2020 - 2021 - 2022
- Arab Women's Club Basketball Championship
  - Runners-Up (1): 2021
  - Third place (1): 1990

== Current roster ==
Squad for the 2021–2022 Syrian Basketball League season:

Al-Thawra roster
Players
Coaches

Pos.	No.	Nat.	Name
G	1	(Syria)	Lamaa Mahmoud
F	4	(Syria)	Alicia Magarian
PG	5	(Syria)	Marya Daibess
SG	6	(Syria)	Cedra Sulaiman
F	7	(Syria)	Noura Bshara
SG	9	(Syria)	Jessica Hakimeh
C	11	(United States)	Chanita Jordan
C		(Tunisia)	Salma Mnasria

Head coach

(Syria) Abdullah Kammouneh

Legend

- (C) Team captain
- Injured

- Roster
Updated: 20 May 2022

Note: Flags indicate national team eligibility at FIBA-sanctioned events. Players may hold other non-FIBA nationalities not displayed.
