= Basketball at the 2007 Arab Games =

Basketball at the 2007 Pan Arab Games

The basketball competition at the 2007 Pan Arab Games was held in November. Egypt beat Jordan in the final to win the gold medal and Qatar won the third place play-off for the bronze.

== Competition ==
=== Group A ===
Team	Pld	W	L	PF	PA	Diff	Pts
Egypt	3	3	0	239	173	66	6
Iraq	3	2	1	226	254	-28	5
Kuwait	3	1	2	222	229	-7	4
United Arab Emirates	3	0	3	209	240	-31	3

- November 14, 2007

UAE 58-72 Kuwait
Egypt 84-42 Iraq

- November 16, 2007

Egypt 74-64 UAE
Kuwait 83-90 Iraq

- November 18, 2007

Egypt 81-67 Kuwait
UAE 87-94 Iraq

=== Group B ===
Team	Pld	W	L	PF	PA	Diff	Pts
Jordan	3	3	0	220	157	+63	6
Qatar	3	2	1	215	199	+16	5
Libya	3	1	2	180	225	-45	4
Saudi Arabia	3	0	3	172	206	-34	3

- November 15, 2007

Saudi Arabia 59-61 Libya
Jordan 71-53 Qatar

- November 17, 2007

Qatar 81-61 Libya
Jordan 64-46 Saudi Arabia

- November 19, 2007

Libya 58-85 Jordan
Qatar 81-67 Saudi Arabia

=== Knock-out stage ===
Semifinals

- November 20, 2007

Iraq 75-104 Jordan
Qatar 60-78 Egypt

The Final

- November 22, 2007

Jordan 73-76 Egypt

The 3rd/4th Place

- November 22, 2007

Iraq 70-91 Qatar
