= Basketball at the 2011 Arab Games =

Basketball at the 2011 Pan Arab Games
- Location: Doha, Qatar
- Dates: 7-22 December

Basketball at the 2011 Pan Arab Games took place in Doha, Qatar from December 7 to 22, 2011. In this tournament, 12 teams played in the men's competition, and 8 teams participated in the women's competition.

== Results ==
=== Men ===
==== First phase ====
===== Group A =====
Team	Pld	W	L	PF	PA	PD	Pts
Algeria	3	3	0	254	178	+76	6
Egypt	3	2	1	272	196	+76	5
Iraq	3	1	2	216	237	−21	4
Sudan	3	0	3	253	284	−131	3

December 10
11:00

Egypt	107–56	Sudan
Scoring by quarter: 34−19, 32−16, 17−8, 24−13

Al Gharafa Sports Club-Indoor Hall, Doha

December 10
13:15

Algeria	85–68	Iraq
Scoring by quarter: 24−17, 31−15, 12−15, 18−21

Al Gharafa Sports Club-Indoor Hall, Doha

December 11
15:30

Iraq	59–92	Egypt
Scoring by quarter: 13−27, 14−23, 16−18, 16−24

Al Gharafa Sports Club-Indoor Hall, Doha

December 11
17:45

Sudan	37–88	Algeria
Scoring by quarter: 2−21, 13−29, 12−17, 10−21

Al Gharafa Sports Club-Indoor Hall, Doha

December 14
15:30

Iraq	89–60	Sudan
Scoring by quarter: 15−19, 14−16, 32−6, 28−19

Al Gharafa Sports Club-Indoor Hall, Doha

December 14
17:45

Egypt	73–81	Algeria
Scoring by quarter: 18−13, 20−17, 17−24, 18−27

Al Gharafa Sports Club-Indoor Hall, Doha

===== Group B =====
Team	Pld	W	L	PF	PA	PD	Pts
Tunisia	3	3	0	222	195	+27	6
Jordan	3	2	1	243	217	+26	5
Lebanon	3	1	2	208	218	-10	4
Morocco	3	0	3	177	218	−41	3

December 10
15:30

Jordan	67–58	Morocco
Scoring by quarter: 12-8, 22-22, 17-18, 16-10

Al Gharafa Sports Club-Indoor Hall, Doha

December 10
17:45

Lebanon	73–79	Tunisia
Scoring by quarter: 22-23, 10-19, 11-11, 30-26

Al Gharafa Sports Club-Indoor Hall, Doha

December 12
17:45

Jordan	69–77	Tunisia
Scoring by quarter: 15-8, 22-20, 35-9, 23-14

Al Gharafa Sports Club-Indoor Hall, Doha

December 13
17:30

Morocco	66–87	Lebanon
Scoring by quarter: 15-25, 17-11, 15-22, 19-29

Al Gharafa Sports Club-Indoor Hall, Doha

December 15
17:30

Tunisia	64–53	Morocco
Scoring by quarter: 12−13, 8−12, 16−18, 28−10

Al Gharafa Sports Club-Indoor Hall, Doha

December 16
20:30

Jordan	83–72 (OT)	Lebanon
Scoring by quarter: 12-15, 6-18, 22-15, 23-15, Overtime: 20-9

Al Gharafa Sports Club-Indoor Hall, Doha

===== Group C =====
Team	Pld	W	L	PF	PA	PD	Pts
Qatar	3	3	0	227	181	+24	6
Kuwait	3	2	1	227	217	+10	5
Saudi Arabia	3	1	2	200	228	−6	4
Palestine	3	0	3	226	254	−20	3

December 7
17:30

Qatar	78–61	Palestine
Scoring by quarter: 26−8, 20−14, 18−18, 14−21

Al Gharafa Sports Club-Indoor Hall, Doha

December 8
17:30

Saudi Arabia	61–70	Kuwait
Scoring by quarter: 18−20, 15−10, 19−10, 18−21

Al Gharafa Sports Club-Indoor Hall, Doha

December 11
11:00

Qatar	70–63	Kuwait
Scoring by quarter: 25−19, 21−12, 13−14, 11−18

Al Gharafa Sports Club-Indoor Hall, Doha

December 11
13:15

Palestine	79–82	Saudi Arabia
Scoring by quarter: 18−15, 25−18, 16−21, 20−28

Al Gharafa Sports Club-Indoor Hall, Doha

December 14
11:00

Qatar	79–57	Saudi Arabia
Scoring by quarter: 20-15, 21-14, 23-8, 15-20

Al Gharafa Sports Club-Indoor Hall, Doha

December 14
13:15

Kuwait	94–86	Palestine
Scoring by quarter: 20-15, 23-22, 33-23, 18-26

Al Gharafa Sports Club-Indoor Hall, Doha

==== Second phase ====
===== Group D =====
Team	Pld	W	L	PF	PA	PD	Pts
Jordan	2	2	0	155	139	+16	4
Qatar	2	1	1	138	133	+5	3
Algeria	2	0	2	124	145	-21	2

December 17
15:30

Qatar	71–77	Jordan
Scoring by quarter: 16−15, 14−22, 25−14, 16−26

Al Gharafa Sports Club-Indoor Hall, Doha

December 18
17:45

Jordan	78–68	Algeria
Scoring by quarter: 13−10, 17−28, 22−14, 26−16

Al Gharafa Sports Club-Indoor Hall, Doha

December 20
13:15

Algeria	56–67	Qatar
Scoring by quarter: 8−17, 15−12, 17−15, 16−23

Al Gharafa Sports Club-Indoor Hall, Doha

===== Group E =====
Team	Pld	W	L	PF	PA	PD	Pts
Egypt	2	2	0	161	122	+39	4
Tunisia	2	1	1	126	141	-15	3
Kuwait	2	0	2	59	67	-24	2

December 17
17:45

Kuwait	59–67	Tunisia
Scoring by quarter: 16−17, 15−11, 13−15, 15−24

Al Gharafa Sports Club-Indoor Hall, Doha

December 18
15:30

Tunisia	59–82	Egypt
Scoring by quarter: 14−13, 18−23, 13−20, 14−26

Al Gharafa Sports Club-Indoor Hall, Doha

December 20
11:00

Egypt	79–63	Kuwait
Scoring by quarter: 22−9, 10−18, 32−19, 15−17

Al Gharafa Sports Club-Indoor Hall, Doha

===== Group F =====
Team	Pld	W	L	PF	PA	PD	Pts
Iraq	2	2	0	153	140	+13	4
Morocco	2	1	1	132	120	+12	3
Saudi Arabia	2	0	2	131	156	-25	2

December 17
11:00

Morocco	71–52	Saudi Arabia
Scoring by quarter: 14-18, 22−7, 19−14, 16−13

Al Gharafa Sports Club-Indoor Hall, Doha

December 18
13:15

Iraq	68–61	Morocco
Scoring by quarter: 12−14, 25−11, 17−21, 14−15

Al Gharafa Sports Club-Indoor Hall, Doha

December 19
17:45

Saudi Arabia	79–85	Iraq
Scoring by quarter: 19−21, 14−20, 25−18, 21−26

Al Gharafa Sports Club-Indoor Hall, Doha

===== Group G =====
Team	Pld	W	L	PF	PA	PD	Pts
Lebanon	2	2	0	204	148	+56	4
Palestine	2	1	1	164	157	+7	3
Sudan	2	0	2	138	201	-63	2

December 17
13:15

Lebanon	90–77	Palestine
Scoring by quarter: 17−22, 32−18, 21−11, 20−26

Al Gharafa Sports Club-Indoor Hall, Doha

December 18
11:00

Sudan	71–114	Lebanon
Scoring by quarter: 22−26, 15−31, 12−25, 22−32

Al Gharafa Sports Club-Indoor Hall, Doha

December 19
15:30

Palestine	87–67	Sudan
Scoring by quarter: 25−26, 26−10, 18−19, 18−12

Al Gharafa Sports Club-Indoor Hall, Doha

==== Final phase ====
===== Placings 11th–12th =====
December 20
15:30

Saudi Arabia	87–64	Sudan
Scoring by quarter: 26−13, 15−16, 20−17, 26−18

Al Gharafa Sports Club-Indoor Hall, Doha

===== Placings 9th–10th =====
December 20
17:45

Morocco	83–65	Palestine
Scoring by quarter: 16−20, 22−12, 26−13, 19−20

Al Gharafa Sports Club-Indoor Hall, Doha

===== Placings 7th–8th =====
December 21
11:00

Iraq	75–89	Lebanon
Scoring by quarter: 20−18, 16−23, 21−26, 18−22

Al Gharafa Sports Club-Indoor Hall, Doha

===== Placings 5th–6th =====
December 21
13:15

Algeria	92–79	Kuwait
Scoring by quarter: 25−22, 29−16, 12−24, 26−17

Al Gharafa Sports Club-Indoor Hall, Doha

Semifinal
December 21
Jordan	74
Tunisia	69
December 21
Egypt	72
Qatar	75

Gold medal game
December 22
Jordan	70
Qatar	78
Bronze medal game
December 22
Tunisia	71
Egypt	88

===== Semifinals =====
December 21
15:30

Jordan	74–69	Tunisia
Scoring by quarter: 20−14, 11−20, 21−20, 22−20

Al Gharafa Sports Club-Indoor Hall, Doha

December 21
17:45

Egypt	72–75	Qatar
Scoring by quarter: 23−10, 21−20, 15−17, 13−28

Al Gharafa Sports Club-Indoor Hall, Doha

===== Bronze medal game =====
December 22
16:00

Tunisia	71–88	Egypt
Scoring by quarter: 18−19, 13−28, 19−22, 21−19

Al Gharafa Sports Club-Indoor Hall, Doha

===== Gold medal game =====
December 22
18:15

Jordan	70–78	Qatar
Scoring by quarter: 13−20, 17−13, 17−24, 23−21

Al Gharafa Sports Club-Indoor Hall, Doha

==== Final standing ====
Rank	Team
1st place, gold medalist(s)	Qatar
2nd place, silver medalist(s)	Jordan
3rd place, bronze medalist(s)	Egypt
4	Tunisia
5	Algeria
6	Kuwait
7	Lebanon
8	Iraq
9	Morocco
10	Palestine
11	Saudi Arabia
12	Sudan

=== Women ===
==== Final round ====
Team	Pld	W	L	PF	PA	PD	Pts
Lebanon	5	5	0	404	205	+197	10
Egypt	5	4	1	528	222	+306	9
Jordan	5	3	2	336	277	+59	8
Somalia	5	2	3	195	281	−86	7
Qatar	5	1	4	242	400	−142	6
Kuwait	5	0	5	172	456	−284	5

December 7
13:00

Qatar	52–46	Kuwait
Scoring by quarter: 9−13, 10−10, 20−14, 13−9

Al Gharafa Sports Club-Indoor Hall, Doha

December 7
15:15

Lebanon	69–40	Jordan
Scoring by quarter: 22−11, 18−3, 16−10, 13−16

Al Gharafa Sports Club-Indoor Hall, Doha

December 8
13:00

Kuwait	28–108	Lebanon
Scoring by quarter: 14−23, 4−23, 6−36, 4−26

Al Gharafa Sports Club-Indoor Hall, Doha

December 8
15:15

Egypt	90–24	Somalia
Scoring by quarter: 25−2, 38−9, 6−9, 21−4

Al Gharafa Sports Club-Indoor Hall, Doha

December 12
11:00

Egypt	67–68	Lebanon

Al Gharafa Sports Club-Indoor Hall, Doha

December 12
13:15

Kuwait	20–82	Jordan

Al Gharafa Sports Club-Indoor Hall, Doha

December 12
15:30

Qatar	57–67	Somalia

Al Gharafa Sports Club-Indoor Hall, Doha

December 13
13:00

Egypt	148–27	Kuwait

Al Gharafa Sports Club-Indoor Hall, Doha

December 13
15:15

Jordan	83–47	Qatar

Al Gharafa Sports Club-Indoor Hall, Doha

December 15
13:00

Lebanon	87–38	Somalia

Al Gharafa Sports Club-Indoor Hall, Doha

December 15
15:15

Jordan	51–91	Egypt

Al Gharafa Sports Club-Indoor Hall, Doha

December 16
16:00

Kuwait	47–66	Somalia

Al Gharafa Sports Club-Indoor Hall, Doha

December 16
18:15

Egypt	132–52	Qatar
Scoring by quarter: 30-14, 27-13, 38-11, 37-14

Al Gharafa Sports Club-Indoor Hall, Doha

December 19
11:00

Jordan	80–50	Somalia

Al Gharafa Sports Club-Indoor Hall, Doha

December 19
13:15

Qatar	34–72	Lebanon

Al Gharafa Sports Club-Indoor Hall, Doha

==== Final standing ====
Rank	Team
1st place, gold medalist(s)	Lebanon
2nd place, silver medalist(s)	Egypt
3rd place, bronze medalist(s)	Jordan
4	Somalia
5	Qatar
6	Kuwait
