= Iraq women's national basketball team =

Iraq
- FIBA ranking: NR (8 August 2025)
- Joined FIBA: 1948
- FIBA zone: FIBA Asia
- National federation: Iraqi Basketball Association

Olympic Games
- Appearances: None

World Cup
- Appearances: None

Asia Cup
- Appearances: None
Home	Away

The Iraq women's national basketball team represents Iraq in international competitions and is governed by the Iraqi Basketball Association (IBA).

== History ==
The Iraqi national team achieved early success by winning the inaugural Arab Women's Basketball Championship in 1983.

Women's Basketball has been growing in Iraq since the first the second Gulf War. Which became a subject of the documentary Salaam Dunk. Following this period, they participated intermittently in regional competitions across the Middle East, including the West Asia Women's Basketball Championships.

In 2017, Iraq placed fourth in the Arab Women's Basketball Championship, marking one of its best recent performances.
