= Lebanon women's national basketball team =

Check

Lebanon
- FIBA ranking: 46 ▼2 (14 September 2026)
- Joined FIBA: 1947
- FIBA zone: FIBA Asia
- National federation: FLB
- Coach: Paul Coughter
- Nickname: The Cedars

Asia Cup
- Appearances: 7
Home	Away
Medal record
Arab Women's Basketball Championship
Gold medal – first place	2003 Jordan
Silver medal – second place	2000 Algeria
Bronze medal – third place	1997 Lebanon
Bronze medal – third place	1983 Jordan
Pan Arab Games
Gold medal – first place	2011 Qatar
Gold medal – first place	2004 Algeria

The Lebanon women's national basketball team represents Lebanon in international women's basketball tournaments and is governed by the Lebanese Basketball Federation.

== History ==
=== Early achievements (1980s-2000s) ===
The Lebanon women's national basketball team emerged on the regional scene in the late 20th century. They secured two third-place finishes at the Arab Women's Basketball Championship in 1983 and 1997. The team's success continued with a silver medal at the 2000 Arab Women's Basketball Championship. Building on this momentum, they achieved the championship title at the 2003 Arab Women's Basketball Championship. The following year, they claimed the gold medal at the 2004 Pan Arab Games. Further solidifying their regional presence, the team secured another gold medal at the 2011 Pan-Arab Games.

=== 2009–2014: Promotion to division A of FIBA Asia and the FIBA ban ===
On the global stage, their achievements included a promotion to Division A of the FIBA Women's Asia Cup after finishing as runners-up in Division B at the 2009 FIBA Asia Championship for Women. In the Division A of the 2011 FIBA Asia Championship for Women, they displayed strong performance, finishing in 5th place. However, internal disputes within the national federation led to a four-year FIBA suspension in 2013. This suspension prevented their participation in the Division A of the 2013 FIBA Asia Championship for Women, resulting in their return to Division B after the ban was lifted in 2014.

=== 2020–present: Promotion back to division A of FIBA Asia ===
After a prolonged period, the team regained their place in Division A by winning the 2021 FIBA Women's Asia Cup Division B. Carrying the momentum forward, they secured their Division A status in the 2023 FIBA Women's Asia Cup by defeating Chinese Taipei with a final score of 75–73, ensuring their participation in the top tier for the upcoming 2025 FIBA Women's Asia Cup. Their 7th place finish in the 2023 FIBA Women's Asia Cup secured Lebanon's participation in the FIBA Women's Basketball World Cup 2026 Pre-Qualifying Tournament. Lebanon did not advance in the Pre-Qualification after losing all three of their group phase games.

The team's final opportunity for qualification came at the 2025 FIBA Women's Asia Cup, which served as the primary qualifier for the 2026 FIBA Women's Basketball World Cup, awarding a direct berth to its champion and spots in the World Cup Qualifying Tournaments to the teams finishing in second to sixth place. However, while Lebanon's 7th-place finish ended their campaign for the 2026 World Cup, it ensured they would remain in Division A for the 2027 FIBA Women's Asia Cup.

== Tournament records ==
=== FIBA World Cup ===
FIBA Women's World Cup						Qualification		
Year	Position	Pld	W	L	Squad	Pld	W	L
1953 to 1998	did not enter					did not enter		
(China) 2002	did not qualify					FIBA Women's Asia Cup served as qualifiers		
(Brazil) 2006	did not enter					did not enter		
(Czech Republic) 2010	did not qualify					FIBA Women's Asia Cup served as qualifiers		
(Turkey) 2014	suspended					suspended		
(Spain) 2018	did not qualify					FIBA Women's Asia Cup served as qualifiers		
(Australia) 2022	did not qualify					did not qualify		
(Germany) 2026	did not qualify					3	0	3
(Japan) 2030	To be determined					To be determined		
Total	0/21	0	0	0		3	0	3

=== Asia Championship ===
FIBA Women's Asia Cup Records
Year	Division A				Division B				Squad
Year	Pos	Pld	W	L	Pos	Pld	W	L	Squad
(Thailand) 2001	13th	level II			8th	4	1	3	
(Japan) 2004	did not participate				did not participate				
(China) 2005	did not participate				did not participate				
(South Korea) 2007	did not participate				did not participate				
(India) 2009	8th	level II			2nd	6	5	1	
(Japan) 2011	5th	6	2	4	Division A				Squad
(Thailand) 2013	suspended				suspended				
(China) 2015	did not participate				did not participate				
(India) 2017	11th	level II			3rd	6	4	2	Squad
(India) 2019	did not participate				did not participate				
(Jordan) 2021	9th	level II			1st	4	4	0	Squad
(Australia) 2023	7th	4	1	3	Division A				Squad
(China) 2025	7th	4	1	3	Division A				Squad
(Philippines) 2027	Qualified				Division A				Squad
Total		14	4	10		20	14	6	

== Squad ==
=== Current roster ===
Roster for the 2025 FIBA Women's Asia Cup.

2025 Lebanon women's national basketball team roster
Players
Coaches

Pos.	No.	Name	Age – Date of birth	Height	Club	Ctr.
C	0	Melody Saneh	23 – 11 October 2001	1.88 m (6 ft 2 in)	Azour Club	(Lebanon)
C	1	Zena Elias	25 – 5 February 2000	1.91 m (6 ft 3 in)	Beirut Club	(Lebanon)
G	3	Maygen Naassan	19 – 24 June 2006	1.83 m (6 ft 0 in)	Al Riyadi	(Lebanon)
PF	5	Maria Ghaleb	24 – 18 April 2001	1.80 m (5 ft 11 in)	Azour Club	(Lebanon)
PF	8	Daniella Fayad	28 – 9 April 1997	1.78 m (5 ft 10 in)	Homenetmen	(Lebanon)
PG	9	Nour Labban	19 – 4 October 2005	1.64 m (5 ft 5 in)	Al Riyadi	(Lebanon)
G	10	Tina Rita Raffoul	26 – 10 September 1998	1.80 m (5 ft 11 in)	Azour Club	(Lebanon)
PG	11	Rebecca Akl (C)	32 – 18 October 1992	1.70 m (5 ft 7 in)	Al Riyadi	(Lebanon)
C	14	Jillian Archer	24 – 16 August 2000	1.90 m (6 ft 3 in)	Homenetmen	(Lebanon)
G	19	Perla Bou Nasr	26 – 10 June 1999	1.77 m (5 ft 10 in)	Homenetmen	(Lebanon)
G	23	Mariam Jomaa	21 – 13 December 2003	1.65 m (5 ft 5 in)	Beirut Club	(Lebanon)
G	24	Amar Mansour	20 – 7 November 2004	1.75 m (5 ft 9 in)	Azour Club	(Lebanon)

Head coach

- (United States) Paul Coughter

Assistant coach(es)

- (Lebanon) Kaissar Lahoud

Legend

- (C) Team captain
- Club – describes last
  club before the tournament
- Age – describes age
  on 13 July 2025

== See also ==
- Sport in Lebanon
- Lebanon women's national under-18 basketball team
- Lebanon women's national under-16 basketball team
- Lebanon men's national basketball team
- Lebanon men's national under-19 basketball team
- Lebanon men's national under-17 basketball team
