= Kuwait women's national basketball team =

Kuwait
- FIBA ranking: NR (14 September 2026)
- Joined FIBA: 1959
- FIBA zone: FIBA Asia
- National federation: Kuwait Basketball Association
- Coach: Saud Alrabah

Olympic Games
- Appearances: None

World Cup
- Appearances: None

Asia Cup
- Appearances: None

The Kuwait women's national basketball team is the basketball side that represents Kuwait in international competitions. It is administered by the Kuwait Basketball Association.

The team appeared at the 2011 Pan Arab Games.

== See also ==
- Kuwait women's national under-19 basketball team
