= Jordan women's national basketball team =

Jordan
- FIBA ranking: 68 ▼3 (18 March 2026)
- Joined FIBA: 1961; 65 years ago
- FIBA zone: FIBA Asia
- National federation: JBF

Olympic Games
- Appearances: None

World Cup
- Appearances: None

Asia Cup
- Appearances: 1
- Medals: None

Pan Arab Games
- Appearances: 3
- Medals: (bronze) Bronze: 1999, 2011
Home	Away

The Jordan women's national basketball team is the nationally controlled basketball team representing Jordan at world basketball competitions for women.

== Asian championship ==
Jordan played in one Asian championships, taking eleventh place in 1995 ABC Championship for Women.

== Pan-Arab games ==
Jordan women's team finished third in two tournaments, the first was in 1999 which was hosted in Amman, Jordan; the second was in 2011 which was held in Qatar.

== Current squad ==
Jordan's squad which participated at the 2011 Pan Arab Games:

Jordan women's national basketball team roster
Players
Coaches

Pos.	No.	Name	Age – Date of birth	Height	Club	Ctr.
	7	Rubi Habash	22 – 26 April 1989		Orthodox	(Jordan)
		Dina Halasa	–		Orthodox	(Jordan)
		Dana Feda	–		Orthodox	(Jordan)
		Aya Almasri	–			(Jordan)
		Dana Naser	–			(Jordan)
		Lubna Naser	–		Orthodox	(Jordan)
		Rasha Abda	–			(Jordan)
		Mira Zakaria	–			(Jordan)
		Lana Zakaria	–			(Jordan)
		Mira Mando	–			(Jordan)

Head coach

- (Jordan) Faisal Al-Nassor

Legend

- Club – describes last
  club before the tournament
- Age – describes age
  on 19 December 2011
