= Basketball in Nepal =

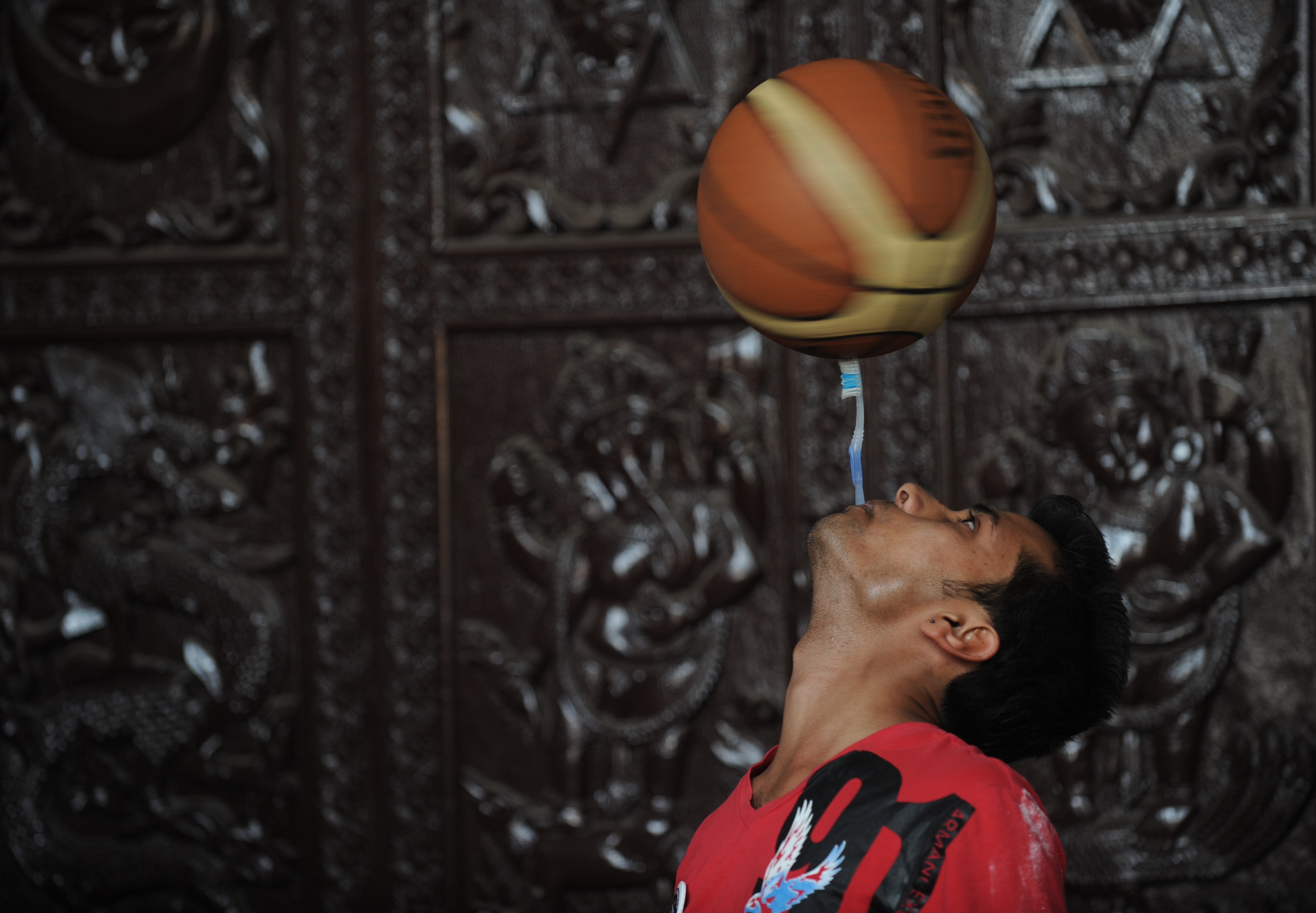
- Country: Nepal
- Governing body: Nepal Basketball Association
- National teams: Men's: Men's; U-19 men's; U-18 men's; U-17 men's; U-16 men's; Nepal men's national 3x3 team; Women's: Women's; U-17 women's; U-16 women's; Nepal women's national 3x3 team
- Nickname: Team Nepal
- First played: 1950s
- Registered players: unknown
- Clubs: 8 (NBL)

Audience records
- Season: NBL Season 2019

Basketball in Nepal has been developing steadily since its introduction to the country in the mid-20th century. The Nepal Basketball Association (NeBA) manages and promotes the sport within the country. Basketball is one of the fastest-growing sports in Nepal, popular especially among the youth in schools and colleges.

== History ==
Basketball was introduced to Nepal in the 1960s, and its popularity began to grow slowly within school systems and local communities. The Nepal Basketball Association (NeBA) was established in 1967 to oversee the development and regulation of the sport in the country.

Nepal joined the International Federation of Basketball (FIBA) in 2000 and from that time Nepal men's national basketball team was formed.

== Events ==
Several basketball leagues and tournaments are conducted in Nepal every year. The National Basketball League (NBL) is the premier basketball competition in Nepal, featuring teams from different provinces of the country.

The national teams regularly participate in FIBA Asia competitions and qualifiers.

== NeBA ==
The Nepal Basketball Association was established and registered in 1989 AD with National Sports Council of Nepal. It is affiliated with International Basketball Federation (FIBA), Asian Basketball Federation (FIBA ASIA), and Nepal Olympic Committee (NOC). NeBA promotes sportsmanship and peace through basketball while also following and honoring the Olympic movement, and it is working hard to develop basketball in Nepal. The current President of NeBA is Bhim Singh Gurung.

== National teams ==
National teams of Nepal
- Nepal (Men's): Nepal (Women's)

== Challenges ==
- Neglect and lack of support: Players and advocates have raised concerns about the lack of government support and rewards for successful athletes, which has led some to quit the sport.
- Player emigration: Some players have left Nepal to play professionally abroad due to the lack of future opportunities in the country.
- Lack of indoor facilities and funding limits player development.

However, growing urban interest, school-level promotion, and international exposure are boosting Nepal’s basketball potential.

== Player development ==
- Academies: Organizations like ISA Nepal are dedicated to teaching basketball from a grassroots level.
- Talent search: Tournaments and leagues provide a platform for local players to showcase their skills and gain experience.

== See also ==
- Sports in Nepal
- Nepal Basketball Association
- FIBA
- FIBA Asia
