= Bangladesh women's national basketball team =

Women's national basketball team representing Bangladesh

Bangladesh
- FIBA ranking: NR (18 March 2026)
- FIBA zone: FIBA Asia
- National federation: Bangladesh Basketball Federation (BBF)
- Coach: Shahidul Islam Panna

Olympic Games
- Appearances: None

World Cup
- Appearances: None

Asia Cup
- Appearances: None

Asian Games
- Appearances: None
Home	Away

The Bangladesh women's national basketball team represents Bangladesh in international women's basketball competitions. They are administered by the Bangladesh Basketball Federation (BBF).

== Results and fixtures ==
Win Loss

=== 2016 ===
29 March 2016	Nepal	92–26	Bangladesh	Dasarath Rangasala Covered Hall, Kathmandu
16:15 BST (UTC+6)	Scoring by quarter: 20–10, 20–3, 31–4, 21–9
	Pts: Sn. Shrestha 25; Rebs: Sn. Shrestha 21	Match Report

31 March 2016	Bangladesh	28–62	Maldives	Dasarath Rangasala Covered Hall, Kathmandu
14:15 BST (UTC+6)	Scoring by quarter: 4–17, 6–11, 10–20, 8–14
		Match Report	Pts: Mohamed 13

1 April 2016	Sri Lanka	115–11	Bangladesh	Dasarath Rangasala Covered Hall, Kathmandu
14:15 BST (UTC+6)	Scoring by quarter: 23–4, 22–3, 28–3, 42–2
	Pts: Ekanayake 15	Match Report

2 April 2016	Bangladesh	29–69	Bhutan	Dasarath Rangasala Covered Hall, Kathmandu
14:15 BST (UTC+6)	Scoring by quarter: 2–18, 8–19, 12–21, 7–13
		Match Report	Pts: Tshering 27

== Competitions records ==
=== Olympic Games ===
Basketball at the Olympic Games records
Hosts	Result	Position	GP	Won	Lost
(Canada) 1976	Did not qualify				
(Soviet Union) 1980	Did not qualify				
(United States) 1984	Did not qualify				
(South Korea) 1988	Did not qualify				
(Spain) 1992	Did not qualify				
(United States) 1996	Did not qualify				
(Australia) 2000	Did not qualify				
(Greece) 2004	Did not qualify				
(China) 2008	Did not qualify				
(United Kingdom) 2012	Did not qualify				
(Brazil) 2016	Did not qualify				
(Japan) 2020	Did not qualify				
(France) 2024	Did not qualify				
(United States) 2028	To be determined				
Total	7/14	0	0	0	0

=== FIBA Women's World Cup ===
FIBA Women's Basketball World Cup records
Hosts	Result	Position	GP	Won	Lost
(Chile) 1953	Did not qualify				
(Brazil) 1957	Did not qualify				
(Soviet Union) 1959	Did not qualify				
(Peru) 1964	Did not qualify				
(Czechoslovakia) 1967	Did not qualify				
(Brazil) 1971	Did not qualify				
(Colombia) 1975	Did not qualify				
(South Korea) 1979	Did not qualify				
(Brazil) 1983	Did not qualify				
(Soviet Union) 1986	Did not qualify				
(Malaysia) 1990	Did not qualify				
(Australia) 1994	Did not qualify				
(Germany) 1998	Did not qualify				
(China) 2002	Did not qualify				
(Brazil) 2006	Did not qualify				
(Czech Republic) 2010	Did not qualify				
(Turkey) 2014	Did not qualify				
(Spain) 2018	Did not qualify				
(Australia) 2022	Did not qualify				
(Germany) 2026	Did not qualify				
(Japan) 2030	To be determined				
Total	0/21	0	0	0	0

=== FIBA Women's Asia Cup ===
FIBA Women's Asia Cup records
Hosts	Result	Position	GP	Won	Lost
(South Korea) 1965	Did not qualify				
(Taiwan) 1968	Did not qualify				
(Malaysia) 1970	Did not qualify				
(Taiwan) 1972	Did not qualify				
(South Korea) 1974	Did not qualify				
(Hong Kong) 1976	Did not qualify				
(Malaysia) 1978	Did not qualify				
(Hong Kong) 1980	Did not qualify				
(Japan) 1982	Did not qualify				
(China) 1984	Did not qualify				
(Malaysia) 1986	Did not qualify				
(Hong Kong) 1988	Did not qualify				
(Singapore) 1990	Did not qualify				
(South Korea) 1992	Did not qualify				
(Japan) 1994	Did not qualify				
(Japan) 1995	Did not qualify				
(Thailand) 1997	Did not qualify				
(Japan) 1999	Did not qualify				
(Thailand) 2001	Did not qualify				
(Japan) 2004	Did not qualify				
(China) 2005	Did not qualify				
(South Korea) 2007	Did not qualify				
(India) 2009	Did not qualify				
(Japan) 2011	Did not qualify				
(Thailand) 2013	Did not qualify				
(China) 2015	Did not qualify				
(India) 2017	Did not qualify				
(India) 2019	Did not qualify				
(Jordan) 2021	Did not qualify				
(Australia) 2023	Did not qualify				
(China) 2025	Did not qualify				
(Philippines) 2027	Did not qualify				
Total	0/32	0	0	0	0

=== Asian Games ===
Asian Games records
Hosts	Result	Position	GP	Won	Lost
(Iran) 1974	Did not participate				
(Thailand) 1978	Did not participate				
(India) 1982	Did not participate				
(South Korea) 1986	Did not participate				
(China) 1990	Did not participate				
(Japan) 1994	Did not participate				
(Thailand) 1998	Did not participate				
(South Korea) 2002	Did not participate				
(Qatar) 2006	Did not participate				
(China) 2010	Did not participate				
(South Korea) 2014	Did not participate				
(Indonesia) 2018	Did not participate				
(China) 2022	Did not participate				
(Japan) 2026	To be determined				
Total	0/12	0	0	0	0

=== Commonwealth Games ===
Commonwealth Games records
Hosts	Result	Position	GP	Won	Lost
(Australia) 2006	Did not participate				
(Australia) 2018	Did not participate				
Total	0/2	0	0	0	0

=== SABA Women's Championship ===
SABA Women's Championship records
Hosts	Result	Position	GP	Won	Lost
(Nepal) 2016	Group Stage	5/5	4	0	4
(Maldives) 2022	Did not participate				
(India) 2025	Did not participate				
Total	1/3	4	0	0	4

=== South Asian Games ===
South Asian Games records
Hosts	Result	Position	GP	Won	Lost
(Nepal) 2019	3rd-place	3/5	4	2	2
(Pakistan) 2027	To be determined				
Total	1/1	Title	4	2	2
