= Sports in Nepal =

Sport in Nepal is an important part of Nepalese culture, encompassing both traditional Nepalese games and modern international disciplines. While Nepal has a long history of traditional sports, the contemporary era is dominated by cricket, football, and volleyball.

On May 23, 2017, the Government of Nepal officially declared volleyball as the national sport, succeeding traditional games like dandi biyo and kabaddi, which were previously considered the de facto national games.

Since the establishment of the National Sports Council in 1959, Nepalese athletes made their Olympic Games debut at the 1964 Summer Olympics and their Paralympic Games debut at the 2004 Summer Paralympics. However, Nepal had not secured an official medal in either event, until taekwondo athlete Palesha Goverdhan made history by winning a bronze medal at the Paris 2024 Paralympic Games. For this achievement, Palesha Goverdhan was awarded रू65 lakh (US$42,000) by the Nepalese prime minister KP Oli on behalf of the Government of Nepal on 13 September 2024.

== International competition ==
=== Olympics ===
Nepal first competed in the summer Olympics at the 1964 Tokyo Olympics, and has competed in eleven straight summer Olympics since the 1972 Munich Olympics. Nepal has also competed in four winter Olympic events, first in the 2002 Salt Lake City Olympics, and last competed in the event at the 2014 Sochi Olympics. As of 2018, Nepal had not won a medal in any of the Olympic events.

=== Asian Games ===
Nepal competed at first Asian Games in 1951 at New Delhi, and won its first medal at the event in the 1986 Seoul Games, winning eight bronze medals. As of 2018, Nepal had won two silver medals and 22 bronze medals at the event.

=== South Asian Games ===
Nepal has competed in every edition of the South Asian Games, and has hosted the event in 1984, 1999 and 2019. As of 2019, Nepal was the fourth-most successful country, winning 679 medals: 130 gold, 182 silver and 367 bronze.

== National competition ==
=== National Games of Nepal ===
The Nepal Olympic Committee and the National Sports Council host the National Games of Nepal every two or three years. The event is meant to identify talent for the South Asian Games, Asian Games and Olympic Games, as well as develop sporting infrastructure throughout the country. The National Games have been held eight times, with the first event in 1982 at Kathmandu.

=== National sports leagues ===
Franchise league

Sport	Domestic league			
Sport	Men	Teams	Women	Teams
Cricket	Prime Minister One Day Cup	10	Prime Minister Women's T20 Cup	9
Cricket	Nepal Premier League (NPL)	8	Lalitpur Mayors Cup	5
Football	Nepal Super League(NSL)	9	ANFA Women's League	10
Football	A Division League	14	ANFA Women's League	10
Football	B Division League	14	ANFA Women's League	10
Football	C Division League	14	ANFA Women's League	10
Volleyball	PM Cup NVA Volleyball League	8	PM Cup NVA Volleyball League	6
Volleyball	Nepal Volleyball League(NVL)	6	Everest Women's Volleyball League(EWVL)	6
Basketball	Nepal Basketball League (NBL)	8	Nepal Women's Basketball League (NBL)	4
Futsal	'A' Division National Futsal League	10		
Golf	Surya Nepal Premier Golf Championship			
Cycling	Nepalese National Championships			
Shooting	National Shooting Championship			
Field hockey	National Men's Hockey Tournament	_	National Women's Hockey Tournament	_
Aquatics	Nepal Aquatics Championship			
Rugby union	Nepal 15s Rugby League	_	Rugby National Women's Tournament	_
Rugby union	Rugby 7S National Tournament	_	Rugby National Women's Tournament	_
Kabaddi	Nepal Kabaddi League (NKL)	6	_	_

== Main sports ==
=== Football ===
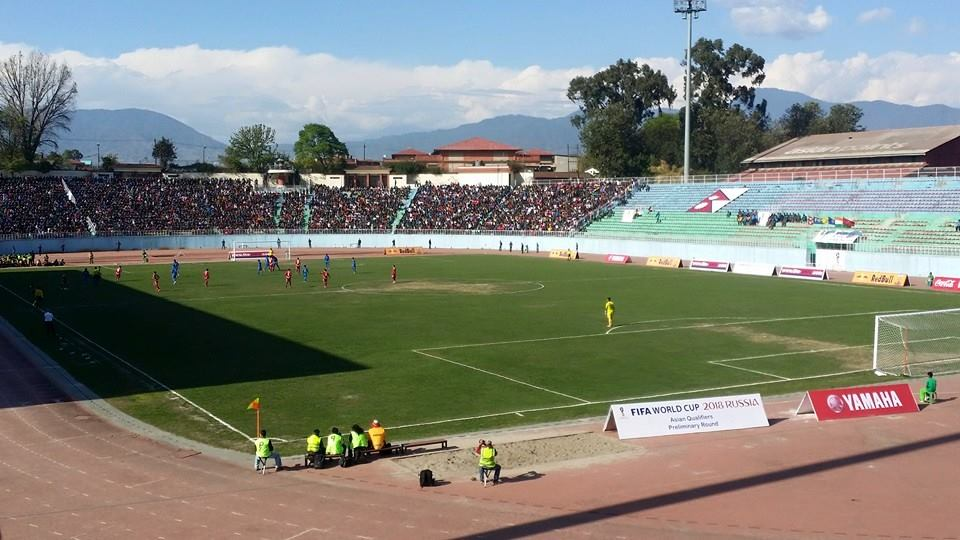
Dasarath Rangasala

Football, also known as soccer, is the most popular sport in Nepal. The All Nepal Football Association (ANFA) is the governing body of Nepalese football that organizes the men's and women's national teams.

Football was introduced to Nepal during the Rana regime in the 1921. Since its introduction, play was mostly limited to the Kathmandu Valley, but since the turn of the millennium, more tournaments have started to be organized throughout the country. The Martyr's Memorial A-Division League is the premier football league in Nepal and has been organized since 1955.

The Nepal national team was organized in 1972 after being affiliated to FIFA in 1971. They lost to China in their first official match. Nepal regularly participates in tournaments organized by the South Asian Football Federation (SAFF) and the Asian Football Confederation (AFC), and was the winner of the 2016 AFC Solidarity Cup.

=== Cricket ===
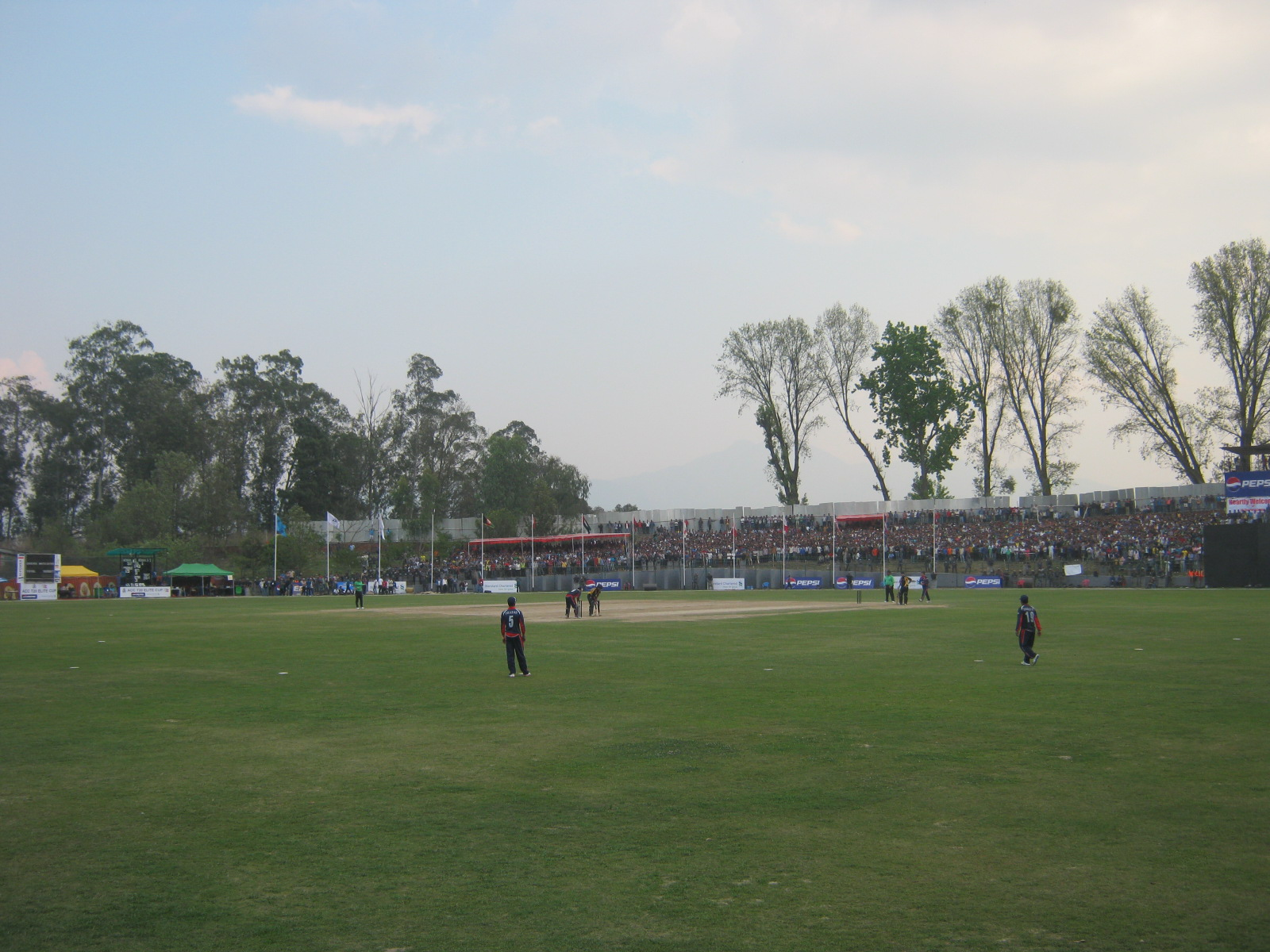
Tribhuvan University International Cricket Ground

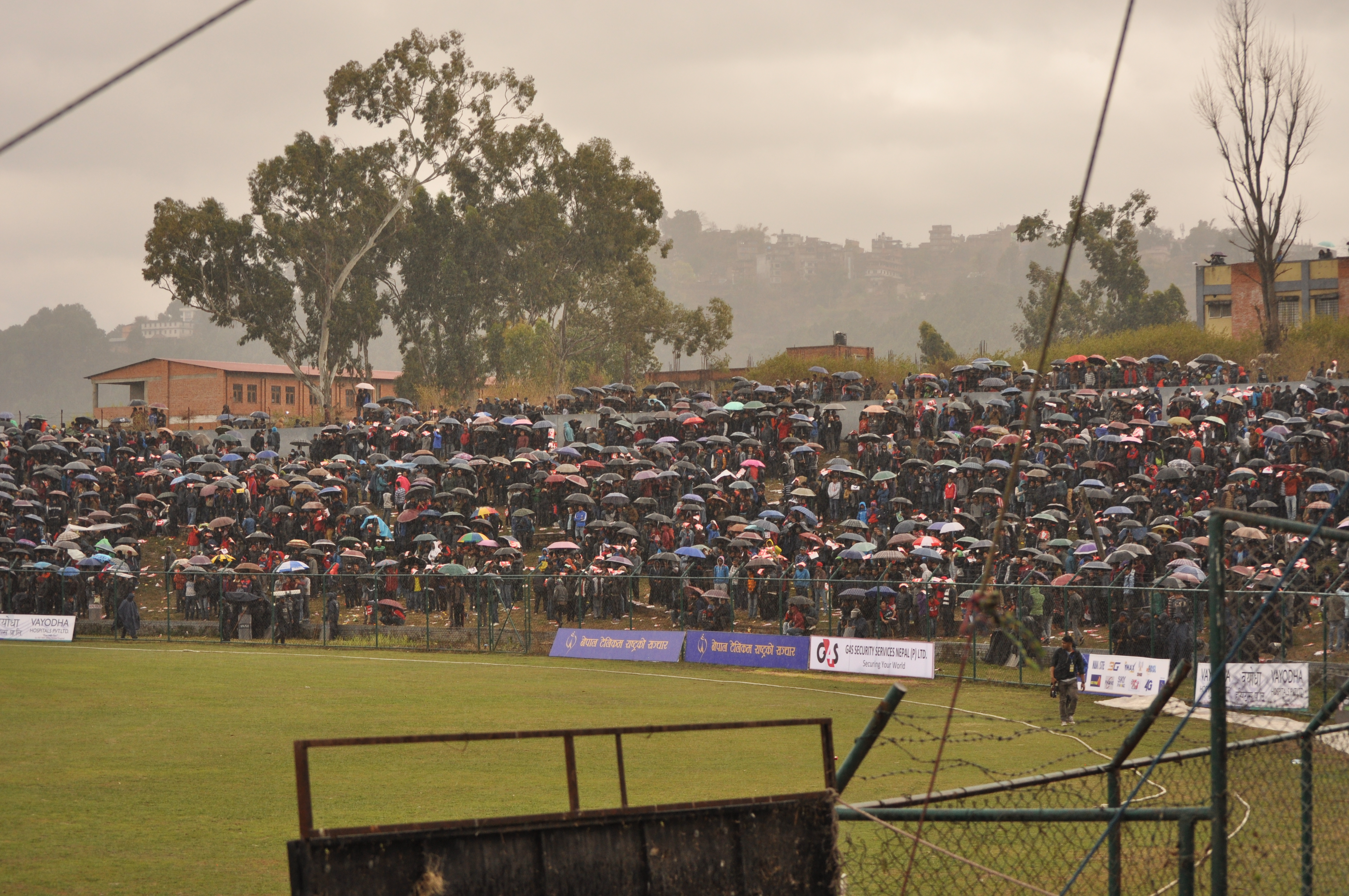
Cricket fans with umbrellas waiting for a match to begin as rain caused it to be abandoned

Cricket is the second most popular sport in Nepal. It rapidly grew in popularity in the mid-2010s, following the slight successes of the Nepalese cricket team as well as the country's explosive rise in social media and television viewing influence from neighboring country India.

The Nepal national cricket team is controlled by the Cricket Association of Nepal (CAN), which was founded in 1946. CAN became a member of the National Sports Council in 1961. It was awarded affiliate status by the International Cricket Council in 1988, and since 1996, has been recognized as an associate member. Nepal has been successful in regional events organized by the Asian Cricket Council, placing first in the ACC Fast Track Countries Tournament in 2006/07, and sharing the title with the United Arab Emirates in the 2012 ACC Trophy Elite. The women's team made their debut in 2007, and qualified for the Women's Asia Cup in 2012 and 2016.

Nepal qualified for the 2014 ICC World Twenty20, which was the only appearance by the senior men's team at a major ICC event, which also gave them Twenty20 International (T20I) status until 2015. The national under-19 team has qualified for the Under-19 Cricket World Cup seven times, including winning the Plate Championship in 2006. Nepal qualified and played in the ICC World Twenty20 2024.

Nepal claimed One Day International (ODI) status for the first time with their six wicket win over Papua New Guinea in the 2018 Cricket World Cup Qualifier playoff encounter on 15 March 2018. The men's and women's team both currently have T20I status, as a result of an ICC decision to expand the status to all member nations.

=== Volleyball ===
Volleyball, the third most popular sport in Nepal, was declared the national sport of Nepal on 22 May 2017 (2074 Jestha 8). The Nepal Volleyball Association (NVA) is the governing body of volleyball in Nepal and organizes the men's and women's national teams. Nepal competes in tournaments organized by the Central Asian Zonal Volleyball Association, which operates under the Asian Volleyball Confederation.

As in many other countries, women's volleyball is more popular than men's. it is played in all 77 districts, which means all parts of Nepal.

== National teams ==
Sport	National team	Association
Badminton	(M & W)	NBA
Baseball	(M & W)	NBSA
Basketball	(M, W)	NeBA
Cricket	(M, W)	CAN
Field hockey	(M, W)	NHA
Football	(M, W)	ANFA
Futsal	(M)	ANFA
Handball	(M, W)	NHA
Kabaddi	(M, W )	ANKA
Kho Kho	(M, W)	NKKA
Rugby Union	(M)	NRA
Volleyball	(M, W)	NVA

== International sports events held in Nepal ==
The following is a list of international sports events held in Nepal.

International sports events hosting record
Sport	Event	Year/date	Venue
Multi-sport event	South Asian Games	1984	Kathmandu
Taekwondo	Asian Taekwondo Championships	1988	Kathmandu
Football	South Asian Football Federation Gold Cup	1997	Kathmandu
Cricket	ACC Trophy	1998	Multiple venues
Multi-sport event	South Asian Games	1999	Kathmandu
Athletics	Asian Cross Country Championships	2001	Kathmandu
Cricket	ACC Under 19 Cup	2005	Multiple venues
Football	AFC Challenge League	2005	Kathmandu
Cricket	World Cricket League	2010	Multiple venues
Cricket	ACC Twenty20 Cup	2011	Multiple venues
Football	AFC Challenge League	2011	Multiple venues
Football	SAFF U-17 Championship	2011	Kathmandu
Football	AFC Challenge Cup	2012	Kathmandu
Cricket	ACC Twenty20 Cup	2013	Multiple venues
Football	SAFF Championship	2013	Kathmandu
Football	SAFF U-16 Championship	2013	Multiple venues
Basketball	SABA Championship	2014	Kathmandu
Football	SAFF U-19 Championship	2015	Lalitpur, Nepal
Basketball	SABA Women's Championship	2016	Kathmandu
Football	SAFF U-15 Championship	2017	Multiple venues
Football	SAFF U-15 Championship	2018	Lalitpur, Nepal
Multi-sport event	South Asian Games	2019	Kathmandu
Football	SAFF U-18 Championship	2019	Kathmandu
Football	SAFF Women's Championship	2019	Kathmandu
Football	SAFF Women's Championship	2022	Kathmandu
Cricket	ACC Premier Cup	2023	Multiple venues
Athletics	Asian Cross Country Championships	2023	Kathmandu
Cricket	ICC Men's T20 World Cup Asia Qualifier	2023	Multiple venues
Football	SAFF U-16 Women's Championship	2024	Lalitpur, Nepal

== Sports awards ==
- NSJF Sports Award
- Pokhara Sports Award
- NNIPA Sports Award
