= Basketball at the 2014 Asian Games =

- Venue: Hwaseong Indoor Arena; Samsan World Gymnasium
- Dates: 20 September – 3 October 2014
- Competitors: 317 from 18 nations

Basketball was one of the 36 sports featured at the 17th Asian Games 2014, which took place in Incheon, South Korea on 20 September – 3 October 2014. The event was held at the 7,406 seat Samsan World Gymnasium, and the 5,158 seat Hwaseong Indoor Arena.

The tournament did not follow FIBA eligibility rules allowing players who obtained citizenship of their national teams to play, but it did impose a three-year residency requirement.

== Schedule ==
| Q | Qualification | P | Preliminary round | S | Second round | C | Classification | ¼ | Quarterfinals | ½ | Semifinals | F | Finals |

| Event↓/Date → | 20th Sat | 21st Sun | 22nd Mon | 23rd Tue | 24th Wed | 25th Thu | 26th Fri | 27th Sat | 28th Sun | 29th Mon | 30th Tue | 1st Wed | 2nd Thu | 3rd Fri |
|---|---|---|---|---|---|---|---|---|---|---|---|---|---|---|
| Men | Q | Q | Q | P | P | P | S | S | S | C | | ½ | | F |
| Women | | | | Q | Q | Q | Q | Q | ¼ | C | | ½ | F | |

== Medalists ==
| Event | Gold | Silver | Bronze |
|---|---|---|---|
| Men | South Korea; Moon Tae-jong; Park Chan-hee; Yang Dong-geun; Kim Tae-sul; Lee Jong-hyun; Kim Sun-hyung; Cho Sung-min; Yang Hee-jong; Kim Joo-sung; Heo Il-young; Oh Se-keun; Kim Jong-kyu | Iran; Rouzbeh Arghavan; Sajjad Mashayekhi; Behnam Yakhchali; Mehdi Kamrani; Arman Zangeneh; Farid Aslani; Hamed Afagh; Oshin Sahakian; Asghar Kardoust; Mohammad Jamshidi; Samad Nikkhah Bahrami; Hamed Haddadi | Japan; Takumi Ishizaki; Ryumo Ono; Makoto Hiejima; Takatoshi Furukawa; Atsuya Ota; Naoto Tsuji; Kosuke Takeuchi; Daiki Tanaka; Tenketsu Harimoto; Yuki Togashi; Kosuke Kanamaru; Joji Takeuchi |
| Women | South Korea; Kim Dan-bi; Lee Mi-sun; Lee Kyung-eun; Park Hye-jin; Kwak Joo-yeong; Yang Ji-hee; Beon Yeon-ha; Lim Yung-hui; Ha Eun-joo; Kim Jung-eun; Kang Young-suk; Sin Jung-ja | China; Liu Dan; Jin Weina; Yu Dong; Shi Xiufeng; Sun Xiaoyu; Shen Binbin; Ma Xueya; Ding Yuan; Zhang Fan; Yang Banban; Yang Hengyu; Jin Jiabao | Japan; Evelyn Mawuli; Hiromi Suwa; Sanae Motokawa; Mucha Mori; Maya Kawahara; Yuri Ushida; Rui Machida; Naho Miyoshi; Rui Kato; Mikoto Onuma; Aya Watanabe; Sakura Akaho |

== Medal table ==
| Rank | Nation | Gold | Silver | Bronze | Total |
|---|---|---|---|---|---|
| 1 | South Korea (KOR) | 2 | 0 | 0 | 2 |
| 2 | China (CHN) | 0 | 1 | 0 | 1 |
| 2 | Iran (IRI) | 0 | 1 | 0 | 1 |
| 4 | Japan (JPN) | 0 | 0 | 2 | 2 |
| Totals (4 entries) | | 2 | 2 | 2 | 6 |

== Draw ==
The teams were seeded based on their final ranking at the 2010 Asian Games.

=== Men ===
The best 8 teams from the basketball competition of the 2010 Asian Games that were participating in 2014 directly entered the second round. The teams were distributed according to their position at the 2010 Asian Games using the serpentine system for their distribution.

Qualifying round – Group A

- Mongolia
- Hong Kong
- Kuwait
- Maldives

Qualifying round – Group B

- Saudi Arabia
- Kazakhstan
- Palestine
- India

Preliminary round – Group C

- China (1)
- Chinese Taipei (9)
- 2nd Qualifying round – Group B

Preliminary round – Group D

- South Korea (2)
- Jordan (7)
- 2nd Qualifying round – Group A

Preliminary round – Group E

- Iran (3)
- Philippines (6)
- 1st Qualifying round – Group B

Preliminary round – Group F

- Japan (4)
- Qatar (5)
- 1st Qualifying round – Group A

=== Women ===
The best 6 teams from the basketball competition of the 2010 Asian Games that were participating in 2014 directly entered the knockout round. The teams were distributed according to their position at the 2010 Asian Games using the serpentine system for their distribution.

Qualifying round

- Mongolia
- Hong Kong
- Kazakhstan
- Nepal
- Qatar

Quarterfinals

- China (1) vs. 2nd Qualifying round
- South Korea (2) vs. 1st Qualifying round
- Japan (3) vs. India (7)
- Chinese Taipei (4) vs. Thailand (5)

== Final standing ==
=== Men ===
| Rank | Team | Pld | W | L |
|---|---|---|---|---|
| 1st place, gold medalist(s) | South Korea | 7 | 7 | 0 |
| 2nd place, silver medalist(s) | Iran | 7 | 6 | 1 |
| 3rd place, bronze medalist(s) | Japan | 7 | 4 | 3 |
| 4 | Kazakhstan | 10 | 4 | 6 |
| 5 | China | 7 | 5 | 2 |
| 6 | Qatar | 7 | 4 | 3 |
| 7 | Philippines | 7 | 3 | 4 |
| 8 | Mongolia | 10 | 3 | 7 |
| 9 | Chinese Taipei | 2 | 0 | 2 |
| 9 | India | 5 | 2 | 3 |
| 9 | Jordan | 2 | 0 | 2 |
| 9 | Kuwait | 5 | 3 | 2 |
| 13 | Hong Kong | 3 | 1 | 2 |
| 13 | Saudi Arabia | 3 | 2 | 1 |
| 15 | Maldives | 3 | 0 | 3 |
| 15 | Palestine | 3 | 0 | 3 |

=== Women ===
| Rank | Team | Pld | W | L |
|---|---|---|---|---|
| 1st place, gold medalist(s) | South Korea | 3 | 3 | 0 |
| 2nd place, silver medalist(s) | China | 3 | 2 | 1 |
| 3rd place, bronze medalist(s) | Japan | 3 | 2 | 1 |
| 4 | Chinese Taipei | 3 | 1 | 2 |
| 5 | Kazakhstan | 7 | 5 | 2 |
| 6 | India | 3 | 1 | 2 |
| 7 | Thailand | 3 | 1 | 2 |
| 8 | Mongolia | 7 | 3 | 4 |
| 9 | Hong Kong | 4 | 3 | 1 |
| 10 | Nepal | 4 | 1 | 3 |
| — | Qatar | 4 | 0 | 4 |
