= Basketball at the 2014 Asian Games – Women's tournament =

Women at the 2014 Asian Games
- Venue: Samsan World Gymnasium; Hwaseong Indoor Arena
- Date: 23 September – 2 October 2014
- Competitors: 129 from 11 nations

Medalists
gold medal	South Korea
silver medal	China
bronze medal	Japan

The women's basketball tournament of the 2014 Asian Games was held at the 7,406 seat Samsan World Gymnasium, and at the 5,158 seat Hwaseong Indoor Arena in Incheon, South Korea from 23 September to 2 October 2014.

With the 2014 FIBA World Championship for Women having been held at the same time as the Asian Games, teams who participated in both tournaments sent two different squads to both Turkey and Incheon. China and Japan sent their "A" team to the World Championship and the "B" team to the Asian Games, while the Koreans did the reverse. The best six teams from the basketball competition of the 2010 Asian Games that participated in 2014 received a bye to the finals.

Prior to the start of the Qatar v Mongolia game in the qualifying round, officials told the Qatari players to take off their headscarves; the players refused, walked off the court and forfeited the game. The Qatari team subsequently withdrew in protest and flew home, but due to communication issues, the organizers were unaware of these events.

After Qatar failed to appear for their game against Nepal the following night, they were disqualified, with this and their remaining games declared forfeited.

== Squads ==
China	Chinese Taipei	Hong Kong	India
Liu Dan; Jin Weina; Yu Dong; Shi Xiufeng; Sun Xiaoyu; Shen Binbin; Ma Xueya; Ding Yuan; Zhang Fan; Yang Banban; Yang Hengyu; Jin Jiabao	Chen Yi-feng; Huang Fan-shan; Hsu Chien-hui; Lan Hao-yu; Lin Yu-ting; Huang Ping-jen; Tsai Pei-chen; Li You-ruei; Chang Ning; Hsieh Pei-chun; Huang Ying-li; Liu Chun-yi	Lam Pik Yi; Wong Man Sze; Cheuk Ting; Wong Tsz Ching; Cho Kit Ying; Yap Yuen Yee; Li Tsz Kwan; Chan Hiu Ying; Lam Yui; Huang Lai Fong; Koon Kin Ho; Chu Hau Yee	Akanksha Singh; Raja Priyadharshini; Raspreet Sidhu; Smruthi Radhakrishnan; Kavita Kumari; Stephy Nixon; K. S. Poojamol; P. S. Neenumol; Kavita Akula; P. S. Jeena; Prashanti Singh; Kruthika Lakshman
Japan	Kazakhstan	Mongolia	Nepal
Evelyn Mawuli; Hiromi Suwa; Sanae Motokawa; Mucha Mori; Maya Kawahara; Yuri Ushida; Rui Machida; Naho Miyoshi; Rui Kato; Mikoto Onuma; Aya Watanabe; Sakura Akaho	Yekaterina Karnova; Rufina Gavrilyuk; Rauan Tutkishova; Olga Abdreupova; Anastassiya Begun; Yuliya Demidenko; Anastassiya Ovechkina; Oxana Ivanova; Anastassiya Arzamastseva; Anna Vinokurova; Oxana Ossipenko; Nadezhda Kondrakova	Otgonbayaryn Bolortuyaa; Zorigtyn Tsolmon; Ganbatyn Bayartsetseg; Ichinkhorloogiin Dolgor; Davaasürengiin Ganzul; Borbaataryn Khos-Erdene; Gantulgyn Zolzayaa; Buriadyn Altanzayaa; Janchivdorjiin Mönkhsuvd; Bayasgalangiin Solongo; Gereltsolmongiin Enkhdelger	Sneha Shrestha; Samiksha Neupan; Samichin Bista; Gyanu Gauchan; Nayana Shakya; Sadina Shrestha; Bhawana Lama; Preeti Tulachan; Luuniva Singh; Anusha Malla
Qatar	South Korea	Thailand	
Munira Mahmoud; Huda Mahmoud; Houweida Tounsi; Ghaliya Said; Suaad Mohamed; Anwar Hussen; Refaa Morjan; Alaa Soliman; Salma Ihab; Amal Mohamed Saleh; Warda Morjan; Amal Mohamed Awad	Kim Dan-bi; Lee Mi-sun; Lee Kyung-eun; Park Hye-jin; Kwak Joo-yeong; Yang Ji-hee; Beon Yeon-ha; Lim Yung-hui; Ha Eun-joo; Kim Jung-eun; Kang Young-suk; Sin Jung-ja	Nomjit Tunsaw; Sineenuch Sorot; Penphan Yothanan; Suree Phromrat; Supavadee Kunchuan; Thidaporn Maihom; Suwimon Sangtad; Chonticha Chirdpetcharat; Pattrawadee Janthabut; Naphat Kruatiwa; Nannapat Danchaivijit; Atchara Kaichaiyapoom	

== Results ==
All times are Korea Standard Time (UTC+09:00)

=== Qualifying round ===
Pos	Team	Pld	W	L	PF	PA	PD	Pts	Qualification
1	Mongolia	4	3	1	240	163	+77	7 (Note: Tied on head-to-head wins (1). Head-to-head game points average: MGL 1.182, KAZ 1.015, HKG 0.834.)	Quarterfinals
2	Kazakhstan	4	3	1	260	167	+93	7	Quarterfinals
3	Hong Kong	4	3	1	245	173	+72	7	
4	Nepal	4	1	3	125	287	−162	5	
—	Qatar	4	0	4	0	80	−80	0	

Source: Results
Notes:

23 September
16:15

Mongolia	64–68	Hong Kong
Scoring by quarter: 17–22, 17–10, 18–21, 12–15
Pts: Ganzul 21; Rebs: Altanzayaa 22; Asts: Tsolmon 4		Pts: Chan 18; Rebs: Chan, Chu 10; Asts: Chan 5

Samsan World Gymnasium, Incheon
Referees: Lei Si Man (MAC), Yang Hongfeng (CHN), Kim Jong-kuk (KOR)

23 September
16:15

Kazakhstan	106–35	Nepal
Scoring by quarter: 29–4, 23–10, 27–11, 27–10
Pts: Vinokurova 21; Rebs: Vinokurova 8 Asts: Abdreupova, Kondrakova 4		Pts: Malla 12; Rebs: Singh 10; Asts: Malla 1

Hwaseong Indoor Arena, Hwaseong
Referees: Lim Sok Hoon (MAS), Huang Chen-yu (TPE), Ryu Soo-hee (KOR)

24 September
16:15

Hong Kong	53–81	Kazakhstan
Scoring by quarter: 18–19, 9–17, 14–25, 12–20
Pts: Cheuk 18; Rebs: Huang, Chu 5 Asts: Lam P. 3		Pts: Vinokurova 21; Rebs: Vinokurova 15; Asts: Abdreupova 6

Samsan World Gymnasium, Incheon
Referees: Yuji Higashi (JPN), Lee Seung-mu (KOR), Huang Chen-yu (TPE)

24 September
16:15

Qatar	0–20	Mongolia
Forfeit

Hwaseong Indoor Arena, Hwaseong
Referees: Lim Sok Hoon (MAS), Kim Cheong-soo (KOR), Liang Bin (CHN)

25 September
16:15

Nepal	20–0	Qatar
Forfeit

Samsan World Gymnasium, Incheon
Referees: Huang Chen-yu (TPE), Liang Bin (CHN), Park Kyoung-jin (KOR)

25 September
16:15

Mongolia	79–53	Kazakhstan
Scoring by quarter: 24–16, 16–9, 25–9, 14–19
Pts: Ganzul 34; Rebs: Mönkhsuvd 10; Asts: Bayartsetseg, Mönkhsuvd 2		Pts: Kondrakova 17; Rebs: Kondrakova 13; Asts: Abdreupova 4

Hwaseong Indoor Arena, Hwaseong
Referees: Lim Sok Hoon (MAS), Lei Si Man (MAC), Kim Cheong-soo (KOR)

26 September
16:15

Qatar	0–20	Kazakhstan
Forfeit

Samsan World Gymnasium, Incheon

26 September
16:15

Hong Kong	104–28	Nepal
Scoring by quarter: 30–10, 36–3, 20–5, 18–10
Pts: Lam P. 26; Rebs: Yap, Chu 8 Asts: Cho, Chu 3		Pts: Tulachan 10; Rebs: Tulachan 12; Asts: Bista, Singh 1

Hwaseong Indoor Arena, Hwaseong
Referees: Shin Gi-rok (KOR), Huang Chen-yu (TPE), Park Kyoung-jin (KOR)

27 September
16:15

Nepal	42–77	Mongolia
Scoring by quarter: 5–25, 13–18, 12–9, 12–25
Pts: Shrestha 15; Rebs: Shrestha 9 Asts: Tulachan, Singh, Malla 2		Pts: Ganzul, Solongo 15; Rebs: Enkhdelger 8 Asts: Bayartsetseg 6

Samsan World Gymnasium, Incheon
Referees: Lim Sok Hoon (MAS), Chan Mei Fung (HKG), Ryu Soo-hee (KOR)

27 September
16:15

Hong Kong	20–0	Qatar
Forfeit

Hwaseong Indoor Arena, Hwaseong

=== Final round ===
Quarterfinals
28 September
China	71
Kazakhstan	57
28 September
Chinese Taipei	98
Thailand	44
28 September
India	37
Japan	70
28 September
Mongolia	41
South Korea	124

Semifinals
1 October
China	75
Chinese Taipei	63
1 October
Japan	53
South Korea	58

Gold medal game
2 October
China	64
South Korea	70
Bronze medal game
2 October
Chinese Taipei	59
Japan	61

Classification (5–8)
29 September
Kazakhstan	62
Thailand	49
29 September
India	68
Mongolia	50

Classification 5th–6th
1 October
Kazakhstan	68
India	47
Classification 7th–8th
1 October
Thailand	74
Mongolia	59

==== Quarterfinals ====
28 September
13:00

China	71–57	Kazakhstan
Scoring by quarter: 22–11, 19–15, 16–17, 14–14
Pts: Liu 18; Rebs: Zhang 7 Asts: Sun, Ding, Yang B. 5		Pts: Kondrakova 14; Rebs: Ossipenko 11; Asts: Kondrakova 4

Samsan World Gymnasium, Incheon
Referees: Sung Ki-jun (KOR), Hsieh Wen-wei (TPE), Batbayaryn Ganzorig (MGL)

28 September
13:00

India	37–70	Japan
Scoring by quarter: 5–15, 13–21, 9–22, 10–12
Pts: Sidhu, Akula 9 Rebs: Nixon 8 Asts: five players 1		Pts: Kawahara 10; Rebs: Suwa 8 Asts: Motokawa, Watanabe 4

Hwaseong Indoor Arena, Hwaseong
Referees: Liang Bin (CHN), Ryu Soo-hee (KOR), Lee Kyoung-hwan (KOR)

28 September
17:30

Chinese Taipei	98–44	Thailand
Scoring by quarter: 28–10, 25–12, 25–8, 20–14
Pts: Huang P. 20; Rebs: four players 5 Asts: Huang F. 4		Pts: Yothanan 11; Rebs: Kaichaiyapoom 8 Asts: Sangtad, Janthabut 2

Samsan World Gymnasium, Incheon
Referees: Yang Hongfeng (CHN), Lee Seung-mu (KOR), Kim Cheong-soo (KOR)

28 September
17:30

Mongolia	41–124	South Korea
Scoring by quarter: 12–28, 7–32, 7–32, 15–32
Pts: Ganzul 13; Rebs: Solongo 7 Asts: Bayartsetseg 2		Pts: Kim D. 27; Rebs: Kim D., Sin 8 Asts: Lee M. 6

Hwaseong Indoor Arena, Hwaseong
Referees: Chan Mei Fung (HKG), Huang Chen-yu (TPE), Jimmy Fung (HKG)

==== Classification (5–8) ====
29 September
14:00

Kazakhstan	62–49	Thailand
Scoring by quarter: 14–18, 20–8, 11–8, 17–15
Pts: Abdreupova 17; Rebs: Kondrakova 10; Asts: Karnova, Demidenko 4		Pts: Phromrat 12; Rebs: Kaichaiyapoom 11; Asts: Sangtad 3

Samsan World Gymnasium, Incheon
Referees: Lim Sok Hoon (MAS), Hsieh Wen-wei (TPE), Chan Mei Fung (HKG)

29 September
14:00

India	68–50	Mongolia
Scoring by quarter: 19–14, 14–9, 22–15, 13–12
Pts: P. Singh 17; Rebs: Priyadharshini, Jeena 10; Asts: Akula 5		Pts: Ganzul 25; Rebs: Mönkhsuvd 9 Asts: Bayartsetseg 3

Hwaseong Indoor Arena, Hwaseong
Referees: Shin Gi-rok (KOR), Jimmy Fung (HKG), Huang Chen-yu (TPE)

==== Semifinals ====
1 October
17:30

China	75–63	Chinese Taipei
Scoring by quarter: 17–21, 20–12, 16–11, 22–19
Pts: Shi 20; Rebs: Zhang 10; Asts: Zhang 4		Pts: Huang P. 19; Rebs: Tsai 9 Asts: Huang F., Liu 4

Samsan World Gymnasium, Incheon
Referees: Arsen Andryushkin (KAZ), Lee Kyoung-hwan (KOR), Batbayaryn Ganzorig (MGL)

1 October
17:30

Japan	53–58	South Korea
Scoring by quarter: 12–9, 9–17, 22–18, 10–14
Pts: Miyoshi 18; Rebs: Ushida 7 Asts: Motokawa 2		Pts: Ha 15; Rebs: Sin 10; Asts: Lee M. 7

Hwaseong Indoor Arena, Hwaseong
Referees: Lim Sok Hoon (MAS), Arnolfo Bermeo (PHI), Chan Mei Fung (HKG)

==== Classification 7th–8th ====
1 October
13:00

Thailand	74–59	Mongolia
Scoring by quarter: 21–13, 17–18, 20–15, 16–13
Pts: Maihom 18; Rebs: Danchaivijit 9 Asts: Sangtad, Danchaivijit 5		Pts: Ganzul 18; Rebs: Solongo 11; Asts: Solongo 4

Samsan World Gymnasium, Incheon
Referees: Shin Gi-rok (KOR), Ryu Soo-hee (KOR), Hsieh Wen-wei (TPE)

==== Classification 5th–6th ====
1 October
13:00

Kazakhstan	68–47	India
Scoring by quarter: 15–12, 21–10, 19–4, 13–21
Pts: Ossipenko 14; Rebs: Vinokurova 11; Asts: Vinokurova 4		Pts: Jeena 14; Rebs: Jeena 8 Asts: Sidhu 3

Hwaseong Indoor Arena, Hwaseong
Referees: Kim Jong-kuk (KOR), Huang Chen-yu (TPE), Jimmy Fung (HKG)

==== Bronze medal game ====
2 October
16:00

Chinese Taipei	59–61	Japan
Scoring by quarter: 13–15, 20–16, 16–6, 10–24
Pts: Huang P., Tsai 13; Rebs: Tsai 9 Asts: Chen 5		Pts: Motokawa 12; Rebs: Ushida 6 Asts: Motokawa, Kawahara, Machida 5

Samsan World Gymnasium, Incheon
Referees: Harja Jaladri (INA), Lei Si Man (MAC), Lee Seung-mu (KOR)

==== Gold medal game ====
2 October
18:15

China	64–70	South Korea
Scoring by quarter: 19–18, 16–15, 17–21, 12–16
Pts: Shi 16; Rebs: Liu 10; Asts: Shi 5		Pts: Beon 16; Rebs: Lee M., Sin 5 Asts: Beon 4

Samsan World Gymnasium, Incheon
Referees: Arsen Andryushkin (KAZ), Lim Sok Hoon (MAS), Yuji Higashi (JPN)

== Final standing ==
Rank	Team	Pld	W	L
1st place, gold medalist(s)	South Korea	3	3	0
2nd place, silver medalist(s)	China	3	2	1
3rd place, bronze medalist(s)	Japan	3	2	1
4	Chinese Taipei	3	1	2
5	Kazakhstan	7	5	2
6	India	3	1	2
7	Thailand	3	1	2
8	Mongolia	7	3	4
9	Hong Kong	4	3	1
10	Nepal	4	1	3
—	Qatar	4	0	4
