= 2026 Nepal Kabaddi League =

Second season of the Nepal Kabaddi League

Tournament information
- Location: Kathmandu, Nepal
- Dates: 5 June 2026–19 June 2026
- Administrators: All Nepal Kabaddi Association (ANKA) and Astronix Management
- Tournament format(s): Round-robin and Playoffs
- Host: Nepal
- Venue: N.S.C. Covered Hall, Kathmandu
- Teams: 6

The 2026 Nepal Kabaddi League (NKL) will be the second season of the Nepal Kabaddi League. Organized by Astronix Management, the tournament is scheduled to be held from 5 June to 19 June 2026 at the National Sports Council Covered Hall in Tripureshwar, Kathmandu.

Six franchise teams representing different cities of Nepal: Kathmandu, Pokhara, Dhangadhi, Biratnagar, Butwal, and Janakpur, are competing in a round-robin format followed by playoffs.

Janakpur Knights are the defending champions.

== Teams ==
On 28 March 2026, the league officially announced the franchise owners for the second season. Two teams underwent rebranding after change in ownership: Biratnagar Bandits became Biratnagar Bahubali and Himalayan Raiders became Butwal Bulls.

Team	City	Captain	Head Coach
Biratnagar Bahubali	Biratnagar, Koshi Province	TBD	TBD
Dhangadi Wild Cats	Dhangadi, Sudurpashchim Province	Padam Bahadur Bista	TBD
Butwal Bulls	Butwal, Lumbini Province	Kalyan Bhujel	TBD
Janakpur Knights	Janakpur, Madhesh Province	Ramu Tamatta	TBD
Kathmandu Mavricks	Kathmandu, Bagmati Province	Ghanshyam Roka Magar	TBD
Pokhara Lakers	Pokhara, Gandaki Province	Pradip Mijar	TBD

== Player Draft ==
The Nepal Kabaddi League (NKL) Season 2 player draft took place on 26 April 2026 (Baishak 13), marking the official selection event where teams built their squads for the 2026 season.

A total of 512 domestic players registered for the draft, a significant increase from the 278 players in the first edition. Additionally, over 100 international players from 15 countries, including India, Iran, South Korea, and Poland, registered for the second season.

== Squads ==
This following squads were confirmed for the 2026 season.

Biratnagar Bahubali	Butwal Bulls	Dhanghadi Wild Cats	Janakpur Knights	Kathmandu Mavericks	Pokhara Lakers
Coaches
Players
Anku Pun; Aditya Chaudhary; Ashok Joshi; Binod Bohora; Bhupendra Bohora; Parash Kunwar; Rabi Tharu; Suraj Bohora; Sushil Chunara; (India) Ankit Kumar Rana; (India) Sachin Manipal; (Sri Lanka) Mohamed Roohullah; (Taiwan) Po-Yu Shih; (Thailand) Nopphadon Pontaisong	Ashok Thapa Magar; Nabin Deuba; Ganesh Parki; Makdum Khan; Prabin Khadka; Rahul Aryal; Sagar Bista; Salman Miya; Satish Kumar Kurmi; (Bangladesh) Md Mijanur Rahman; (India) Anuj Saini; (India) Ashish Sahdev Malik; (South Korea) Dong Geon Lee; (Thailand) Pramot Saising	Amit Kumar Rajbhar; Bijay Mahar; Jitendra Awasthi; Kumar Lama; Prakash Giri; Rohit Yadav; Sabin Bohaju; Santosh Malla; Sohail Islam; Ujjal Oli; (India) Amit Surender; (India) Rohit Yadav; (Kenya) Helvicsimiyu Wanjala; (Pakistan) Muhammad Jamshaid; (Thailand) Saharat Phetchui	Alex Sahani; Kamlesh Loniya; Karun Rasaili; Manab Pithakote Magar; Meghraj Giri; Raheman Khan; Ramu Tamatta; Rohit B.K.; Sanskar Kumar; (Bangladesh) Md. Rasel Hasan; (India) Aman Dalal; (India) Rohit Kumar; (Taiwan) Xian-Ya Peng; (Thailand) Chayaphon Kamunee	Ghanshyam Roka Magar (c); Dipesh Gharti Magar; Israr Khan; Nageshor Tharu; Prahalad Adhikari; Raju Babu Yadav; Sagar Yadav; Sohan Budhamagar; Sushil Ram Luhar; (India) Milan Dahiya; (Kenya) Samuelwanjala Wafula; (South Korea) Jonghoon Choi; (Taiwan) Wu Fu-Kai Jin; (Thailand) Tanongsak Srihera	Bhuwan Bohora; Jiban Blon; Kamal B.K.; Pramod Kumar Shrestha; Rabin Kunwar; Sandesh Tamang; Sukhdev Rokaya Chhetri; Sulav Khatiwada; Rupak Bhuju; (India) Hitesh Kadiyan; (India) Mohammad Aamir; (Kenya) James Namaba Kamweti; (South Korea) Jangkun Lee; (Thailand) Rattanakon Yotsungnoen

- All the players are arranged in alphabetical order.
- Foreign players are listed with their country flags, sorted alphabetically by country and then by player name within each country.
- '(c)' stands for Captain.

== Venue ==
All matches will be held at the Nepal Sports Council Covered Hall in Tripureshwor, Kathmandu.

Tripureshwor, Kathmandu
National Sports Council Covered Hall
Capacity: 1,500+
Venue in Kathmandu District

== Points Table ==
Pos	Team	Pld	W	L	T	SD	Pts	Qualification
1	Biratnagar Bahubali		0	0	0			Advance to the Qualifier 1
2	Butwal Bulls		0	0	0			Advance to the Qualifier 1
3	Dhanghadi Wild Cats		0	0	0			Advance to the Eliminator
4	Janakpur Knights		0	0	0			Advance to the Eliminator
5	Kathmandu Mavericks		0	0	0			
6	Pokhara Lakers		0	0	0			

First match(es) will be played: 5 June 2026. Source:
Rules for classification:
- 5 points for a win
- 3 points for a tied game
- 1 point for a loss by 7 points or fewer

== Play-offs ==
=== Brackets ===
Qualifier 1
1
2
Eliminator
3
4

Qualifier 2
Q1L
EW

Final
Q1W
Q2W

== Broadcasting ==
Astronix Management signed an agreement with Kantipur Max TV HD as the official broadcasting partner. All matches will be telecast live.

== See also ==
- Sports in Nepal
- Nepal Kabaddi League
- All Nepal Kabaddi Association
- 2025 Nepal Kabaddi League
- Nepal national kabaddi team
- Nepal women's national kabaddi team
