= 2025 Nepal Kabaddi League =

Kabaddi League in Nepal

- The official logo of NKL for 2025 season

Tournament information
- Dates: 17 January 2025–31 January 2025
- Administrators: All Nepal Kabaddi Association(ANKA)
- Tournament format(s): round-robin and playoffs
- Host: Nepal
- Venue: N.S.C. Covered Hall, Kathmandu
- Teams: 6

Final positions
- Champion: Janakpur Knights
- Runner-up: Kathmandu Mavericks

Tournament statistics
- Matches played: 19
- Top scorer: (Nepal) Ghanshyam Roka Magar (174) (Kathmandu Mavericks)
- Most tackle points: (Thailand) Tanongsak Srihera (35) (Janakpur Knights)
- Most successful raid: (Nepal) Ghanshyam Roka Magar (125) (Kathmandu Mavericks)
- Most successful tackle: (Thailand) Tanongsak Srihera (35) (Janakpur Knights)

The 2025 Nepal Kabaddi League (NKL), also known as KB SAM NKL 2025 for sponsorship reasons, was the inaugural season of the Nepal Kabaddi League. It featured six teams from different cities competing in a round-robin format. The tournament featured six teams competing in 19 matches from 17 January to 31 January 2025 (4 Magh to 18 Magh 2081 [ B.S ] ).

This was the first season of the Nepal Kabaddi League. Teams represented six cities in Nepal: Kathmandu, Pokhara, Dhangadhi, Biratnagar, Butwal, and Janakpur. All matches were held at the Nepal Sports Council Covered Hall of Dasharath Stadium in Tripureshwar, Kathmandu.

Janakpur Knights became the champions of the inaugural season, defeating Kathmandu Mavericks in the final by 43 – 41.

== Squads ==
This was the final squad for Nepal Kabaddi League 2025.

| Biratnagar Bandits | Dhanghadi Wild Cats | Himalayan Raiders | Janakpur Knights | Kathmandu Mavericks | Pokhara Lakers |
Coaches
| Lok Bahadur Bist | Mahesh Bohara | Sandip Pant | Parbati Rai | Saroj Kumar Singh | Bishnu Datt Bhatta |
Players
| Kalyan Bhujel (c); Satish Kumar Kurmi; Binay Gosain; Suraj Bohora; Sushil Chunara; Ghanshyam Yadav; Tilak Gurung; Vishal Chaudhary; Raju Babu Yadav; Amit Kumar Rajbhar; Sumit Prasad Mahato Tharu; Mirap Thapa Magar; (Thailand) Nopphadon Pontaisong; (Thailand) Rattanakon Yotsungnoen | Padam Bdr. Bista (c); Ashok Thapa Magar; Kamlesh Loniya; Govinda Khadka; Ranjit Gajmer; Prakash Giri; Manoj Bhatta Kapadi; Bishram Khatik; Rahul Chaudhary; Sushil Kumar Chaudhary; Aakash Bhatt; (Kenya) Stephen Amollo Adongo; (Sri Lanka) Ahangama Polwattha Galappatthige; (Bangladesh) Md Yeasin Arafat | Ganesh Parki (c); Kumar Lama; Khagendra Raj Joshi; Israr Khan; Nabin Deuba; Saroj Adhikari; George Embugwa; Franklyne Odhare; Rakesh Kumar Yadav; Akash Malla; (Bangladesh) George Embugwa; Rahul Aryal; (Bangladesh) Mohammed Shahan; MD Roman Hossain | Ramu Tamatta (c); Harish Khatri; Sangam Chaudhary; Sabin Bohaju; Giriraj Roka Magar; Rupak Bhuju; Sahid Ansari; MD Sahil Seikh; Nabin Luhar; (Thailand) Tanongsak Srihera Srihera; (Sri Lanka) Laxmamohan Thanushan; Dilan Sanjaya; (Thailand) Chayaphon Kamunee; Bishal Thapa | Ghanshyam Roka Magar (c); Sohail Islam; Pramod Shrestha; Meghraj Giri; Durgeshwor Koiri; Rahul Kumar Ray; Binay Kumar Koiri; Sagar Chaudhary; Alex Sahani; Bhola Yadav; Lal Mohar Yadav; (Thailand) Saharat Phetchui; (Bangladesh) Md Mijanur Rahman; (Thailand) Roengrom Chaturonphaisan | Pradip Mijar (c); Bhuwan Bohora; Sandesh Tamang; jitendra Awasthi; Rohan Shrestha; Nageshor Tharu; Rabin Kunwar; Sushil Ram Luhar; Bhupendra Bohara; Sarman Prajapati; (Bangladesh) MD Monirul Chodhury; (Bangladesh) MD Sabuz Mia; Kamal Giri; Birendra Kunwar |

- Foreign players are listed along with their respective flag.
- 'c' stands for Captain.

== Venue ==
Tripureshwor, Kathmandu
Nepal Sports Council Covered Hall
Capacity: 1500+
Venue in Kathmandu District

== Points Table ==
| Pos | Team | Pld | W | L | T | SD | Pts | Qualification |
|---|---|---|---|---|---|---|---|---|
| 1 | Janakpur Knights | 5 | 4 | 0 | 1 | 26 | 23 | Advanced to the Qualifier 1 |
| 2 | Biratnagar Bandits | 5 | 4 | 1 | 0 | 40 | 21 | Advanced to the Qualifier 1 |
| 3 | Kathmandu Mavericks | 5 | 3 | 1 | 1 | 37 | 19 | Advanced to the Eliminator |
| 4 | Dhanghadi Wild Cats | 5 | 2 | 3 | 0 | –25 | 11 | Advanced to the Eliminator |
| 5 | Himalayan Raiders | 5 | 1 | 4 | 0 | –36 | 7 | Eliminated |
| 6 | Pokhara Lakers | 5 | 0 | 5 | 0 | –42 | 4 | Eliminated |

Updated to match(es) played on 25 January 2025. Source: Nepal Kabaddi League
Rules for classification:
- 5 points for a win
- 3 points for a tied game
- 1 point for a loss by 7 points or fewer

== League Stage ==
The following fixtures were released on 09 January 2025.

Match 1
17 January 2025
18:30

| Kathmandu Mavericks | 42 – 41 | Pokhara Lakers |
|---|---|---|
| Ghanshyam Roka Magar (17) | Result | Pradip Mijar (8) |

Kathmandu Mavericks won

Match 2
18 January 2025
17:30

| Dhanghadi Wild Cats | 34 – 46 | Biratnagar Bandits |
|---|---|---|
| Ahangama Polwattha Galappatthige (9) | Result | Nopphadon Pontaisong (12) |

Biratnagar Bandits won

Match 3
18 January 2025
18:30

| Himalayan Raiders | 24 – 35 | Janakpur Knights |
|---|---|---|
| Mohammed Shahan (7) | Result | Chayaphon Kamunee (11) |

Janakpur Knights won

Match 4
19 January 2025
17:30

| Biratnagar Bandits | 44 – 43 | Kathmandu Mavericks |
|---|---|---|
| Nopphadon Pontaisong (23) | Result | Ghanshyam Roka Magar (28) |

Biratnagar Bandits won

Match 5
19 January 2025
18:30

| Pokhara Lakers | 30 – 34 | Himalayan Raiders |
|---|---|---|
| Nageshor Tharu (10) | Result | Ganesh Parki (13) |

Himalayan Raiders won

Match 6
20 January 2025
18:30

| Dhanghadi Wild Cats | 31 – 37 | Janakpur Knights |
|---|---|---|
| Md Yeasin Arafat (11) | Result | Chayaphon Kamunee (18) |

Janakpur Knights won

Match 7
21 January 2025
17:30

| Kathmandu Mavericks | 56 – 34 | Himalayan Raiders |
|---|---|---|
| Md Mijanur Rahman (21) | Result | George Embugwa (6) |

Kathmandu Mavericks won

Match 8
21 January 2025
18:30

| Janakpur Knights | 40 – 38 | Biratnagar Bandits |
|---|---|---|
| Chayaphon Kamunee (13) | Result | Nopphadon Pontaisong (9) |

Janakpur Knights won

Match 9
22 January 2025
18:30

| Dhanghadi Wild Cats | 38 – 33 | Pokhara Lakers |
|---|---|---|
| Prakash Giri (12) | Result | MD Monirul Chodhury (10) |

Dhanghadi Wild Cats won

Match 10
23 January 2025
17:30

| Dhanghadi Wild Cats | 36 –51 | Kathmandu Mavericks |
|---|---|---|
| Ahangama Polwattha Galappatthige (11) | Result | Ghanshyam Roka Magar (27) |

Kathmandu Mavericks won

Match 11
23 January 2025
18:30

| Janakpur Knights | 36 – 29 | Pokhara Lakers |
|---|---|---|
| Chayaphon Kamunee (18) | Result | Bhuwan Bohora (15) |

Janakpur Knights won

Match 12
24 January 2025
17:30

| Himalayan Raiders | 30 – 34 | Biratnagar Bandits |
|---|---|---|
| Ganesh Parki (13) | Result | Nopphadon Pontaisong (14) |

Biratnagar Bandits won

Match 13
24 January 2025
18:30

| Kathmandu Mavericks | 39 – 39 | Janakpur Knights |
|---|---|---|
| Ghanshyam Roka Magar (17) | Result | Chayaphon Kamunee (22) |

Match draw

Match 14
25 January 2025
17:30

| Himalayan Raiders | 38 – 41 | Dhanghadi Wild Cats |
|---|---|---|
| Ganesh Parki (12) | Result | Ahangama Polwattha Galappatthige (9) |

Dhanghadi Wild Cats won

Match 15
25 January 2025
18:30

| Pokhara Lakers | 25 – 50 | Biratnagar Bandits |
|---|---|---|
| Md Monirul Chodhury (4) | Result | Nopphadon Pontaisong (15) |

Biratnagar Bandits won

== Play-offs ==
=== Brackets ===
Qualifier 1
27 January 2025
1 | Janakpur Knights | 34
2 | Biratnagar Bandits | 32
Eliminator
27 January 2025
3 | Kathmandu Knights | 50
4 | Dhanghadi Wild Cats | 45

Qualifier 2
29 January 2025
Q1L | Biratnagar Bandits | 26
EW | Kathmandu Mavericks | 48

Final
31 January 2025
Q1W | Janakpur Knights | 43
Q2W | Kathmandu Mavericks | 41

=== Qualifier 1 ===
Match 16
27 January 2025
15:30

| Janakpur Knights | 34 – 32 | Biratnagar Bandits |
|---|---|---|
| Chayaphon Kamunee (11) | Result | Nopphadon Pontaisong (19) |

Janakpur Knights won

=== Eliminator ===
Match 17
27 January 2025
18:30

| Kathmandu Mavericks | 50 – 45 | Dhanghadi Wild Cats |
|---|---|---|
| Ghanshyam Roka Magar (32) | Result | Ahangama Polwattha Galappatthige (22) |

Kathmandu Mavericks won

=== Qualifier 2 ===
Match 18
29 January 2025
18:30

| Biratnagar Bandits | 26 – 48 | Kathmandu Mavericks |
|---|---|---|
| Satish Kumar Kurmi (8) | Result | Ghanshyam Roka Magar (23) |

Kathmandu Mavericks won

=== Final ===
Match 19
31 January 2025
18:30

| Janakpur Knights | 43 – 41 | Kathmandu Mavericks |
|---|---|---|
| Chayaphon Kamunee (16) | Result | Ghanshyam Roka Magar (17) |

Janakpur Knights won

== See also ==
- Sports in Nepal
- Nepal Kabaddi League
- All Nepal Kabaddi Association
- 2026 Nepal Kabaddi League
- Nepal national kabaddi team
- Nepal women's national kabaddi team
