= 2016 SABA Women's Championship =

2016 SABA Championship for Women
1st South Asian Women's Basketball Championship
- 2016 SABA Women's Championship Official Logo

Tournament details
- Host country: Nepal
- Dates: 29 March–2 April
- Teams: 5 (from 1 confederation)
- Venue: 1 (in 1 host city)

Final positions
- Champions: Sri Lanka (1st title)
- PPG (Team): Sri Lanka (81.4)

The 2016 SABA Women's Championship was the 1st SABA Women's Championship. The tournament was held from 29 March to 2 April in Kathmandu, Nepal. Five (5) teams are reported to join the women's maiden tournament for SABA subzone, one of FIBA Asia's subzone. India, Pakistan and Afghanistan were reportedly not seeing action in the five-day competition.

Sri Lanka won their first ever subzone championship by thrashing hosts Nepal in the final game, 75–49. Maldives scored their second successive international win against Bhutan in the penultimate day of the tournament, 69–46, to bag the bronze medal.

== Standings ==
Pos	Team	Pld	W	L	PF	PA	PD	Pts	Final Result
1	Sri Lanka	4	4	0	407	130	+277	8	Gold medal
2	Nepal (H)	4	3	1	308	169	+139	7	Silver medal
3	Maldives	4	2	2	206	256	−50	6	Bronze medal
4	Bhutan	4	1	3	178	300	−122	5	
5	Bangladesh	4	0	4	94	338	−244	4	

Source: Arko Network
Rules for classification: (1) Tournament points, (2) Head-to-head tournament points, (3) Head-to-head goal average, (4) Overall goal average, (5) Drawing of lots
(H) Hosts

== Results ==
All times are in Nepal Standard Time (UTC+05:45)

29 March
13:00

Match Report

Sri Lanka	105–39	Maldives
Scoring by quarter: 27–10, 22–8, 22–12, 34–9
Pts: Silva 25

Dasarath Rangasala Covered Hall, Kathmandu

29 March
16:00

Match Report

Nepal	92–26	Bangladesh
Scoring by quarter: 20–10, 20–3, 31–4, 21–9
Pts: Sn. Shrestha 25; Rebs: Sn. Shrestha 21

Dasarath Rangasala Covered Hall, Kathmandu

30 March
14:00

Match Report

Bhutan	31–112	Sri Lanka
Scoring by quarter: 6–31, 11–28, 12–31, 2–22

Dasarath Rangasala Covered Hall, Kathmandu

30 March
16:00

Match Report

Maldives	36–77	Nepal
Scoring by quarter: 0–22, 13–19, 6–24, 17–12
		Pts: Sn. Shrestha 24

Dasarath Rangasala Covered Hall, Kathmandu

31 March
14:00

Match Report

Bangladesh	28–62	Maldives
Scoring by quarter: 4–17, 6–11, 10–20, 8–14
		Pts: Mohamed 13

Dasarath Rangasala Covered Hall, Kathmandu

31 March
16:00

Match Report

Bhutan	32–90	Nepal
Scoring by quarter: 9–24, 8–34, 7–16, 10–16
		Pts: Lama 21; Rebs: Sn. Shrestha 14; Asts: An. Malla 9

Dasarath Rangasala Covered Hall, Kathmandu

1 April
14:00

Match Report

Sri Lanka	115–11	Bangladesh
Scoring by quarter: 23–4, 22–3, 28–3, 42–2
Pts: Ekanayake 15

Dasarath Rangasala Covered Hall, Kathmandu

1 April
16:00

Match Report

Maldives	69–46	Bhutan
Scoring by quarter: 19–11, 16–6, 12–21, 22–8
Pts: Ubailhalla 18

Dasarath Rangasala Covered Hall, Kathmandu

2 April
14:00

Match Report

Bangladesh	29–69	Bhutan
Scoring by quarter: 2–18, 8–19, 12–21, 7–13
		Pts: Tshering 27

Dasarath Rangasala Covered Hall, Kathmandu

2 April
16:00

Match Report

Nepal	49–75	Sri Lanka
Scoring by quarter: 11–15, 13–20, 16–17, 9–23
		Pts: Gallage 14

Dasarath Rangasala Covered Hall, Kathmandu

== Final standings ==
Rank	Team
Gold medal	Sri Lanka
Silver medal	Nepal
Bronze medal	Maldives
4	Bhutan
5	Bangladesh

== Awards ==
2016 SABA Women's champions

Sri Lanka
First title
