= Nepal Kabaddi League =

Kabaddi tournament in Nepal

- The official logo of NKL
- Country: Nepal
- Administrator: All Nepal Kabaddi Association(ANKA) and Astrionix Management Private Limited
- First tournament: 2025
- Next tournament: 2026
- Tournament format: Round-robin league and playoffs
- Number of teams: 6
- Current champions: Janakpur Knights
- Most successful: Janakpur Knights (1 title)
- TV partner(s): Kantipur Max TV HD
- Slogan: Mato dekhi Maidan Samma
- Website: nepalkabaddileague.com

The Nepal Kabaddi League (NKL) organized by Astrionix Management is a professional-level Kabaddi League in Nepal, featuring six franchise teams representing Kathmandu, Pokhara, Biratnagar, Janakpur, Dhangadhi, and Butwal. The inaugural season was held from January 17 to January 31 of 2025.

The NKL was established to promote Kabaddi in Nepal and provide a platform for local talent to showcase their skills. The league is organized by Astrionix Management Private Limited.

Janakpur Knights won the inaugural season by defeating Kathmandu Mavericks in the final with a score of 43 – 41.

== History ==
This league was envisioned by the owner of Astrionix Management – Mr. Amit Begani. Over 90 kabaddi players from Nepal and abroad were featured in the players' draft, held on 15 December 2024 in Kathmandu. The league was officially launched in November 2024.

The NKL aims to boost Kabaddi's popularity in Nepal and develop the sport at the grassroots level. The league is expected to be a significant step towards achieving these goals, with the potential to attract more players and fans to the sport.

== Organization ==
Teams acquire players through an auction. Each team has a squad of 14 players, with the opportunity of signing up to four foreign players. Drafting of the inaugural season took place on 15 December 2024. .The inaugural edition saw participation from international players from Bangladesh, Kenya, Sri Lanka, and Thailand.

== Format ==
The league follows single round-robin format, with each team playing against every other team at National Sports Council Covered Hall (NSC Covered Hall), Tripureshwor, Kathmandu.

== Teams ==
The NKL consists of six franchise teams, each representing a major city in Nepal.

On 28 March 2026, the league officially announced the franchise owners for the second season. Two teams underwent rebranding after change in ownership: Biratnagar Bandits became Biratnagar Bahubali and Himalayan Raiders became Butwal Bulls.

Cities represented by NKL teams as of 2025

=== Current teams ===
Team	City	Debut	Captain	Head Coach	Owner(s)	Ref.
Biratnagar Bahubali	Biratnagar, Koshi Province	2025	Kalyan Bhujel	Satisha Nayaka	National Investment Holding Pvt. Ltd.	
Butwal Bulls	Butwal, Lumbini Province	2025	Ganesh Bahadur Karki	Sandip Pant	Morai Corporation Pvt. Ltd.	
Dhangadi Wild Cats	Dhangadi, Sudurpashchim Province	2025	Padam Bahadur Bist	Mahesh Bohara	Dhading Wildcat Pvt. Ltd.	
Janakpur Knights	Janakpur, Madhesh Province	2025	Ramu Tamatta	Ganesh Krishna	Neco Insurance Limited	
Kathmandu Mavricks	Kathmandu, Bagmati Province	2025	Ghanashyam Roka Magar	Alok Singh	Kathmandu Mavericks Pvt. Ltd.	
Pokhara Lakers	Pokhara, Gandaki Province	2025	Pradip Mijar	Rajaram Periyapuliyan	Fewa Construction Pvt. Ltd.	

=== Franchise history ===
Season Franchise (Owner)	2025	2026
Biratnagar	Biratnagar Bandits (Not Announced)	Biratnagar Bahubali (National Investment Holding Pvt. Ltd.)
Butwal	Himalayan Raiders (Not Announced)	Butwal Bulls (Morai Corporation Pvt. Ltd.)

== Tournament season and result ==
Season	Final			Final Venue	Best Raider	Best Defender	Most Total Points
Season	Winner	Result	Runner-up	Final Venue	Best Raider	Best Defender	Most Total Points
2025	Janakpur Knights	45 – 41 Result	Kathmandu Mavericks	N.S.C. Covered Hall, Tripureshwor	Ghanshyam Roka Magar	Tanongsak Srihera	Ghanshyam Roka Magar
2026				N.S.C. Covered Hall, Tripureshwor			

== Team performances ==
Season (No. of teams)	2025 (6)	2026 (6)
Biratnagar Bahubali	PO	
Dhanghadi Wild Cats	PO	
Butwal Bulls	5th	
Janakpur Knights	C	
Kathmandu Mavericks	RU	
Pokhara Lakers	6th	

- All the NKL teams have been listed alphabetically.
- C: Champions
- RU: Runner-up
- PO: Team qualified for the playoffs of the competition

== Future Plans ==
The Astrionix Management has plans to expand the league by introducing a Women's Kabaddi League in the future. The Management team is also working on securing more sponsors and Partnerships to ensure the League's long-term sustainability and growth.

== See also ==
- Sports in Nepal
- Nepal national kabaddi team
- Nepal women's national kabaddi team
