= All Nepal Kabaddi Association =

Sports governing body in Nepal

- Sport: Kabaddi
- Jurisdiction: (Nepal) National
- Abbreviation: ANKA
- Founded: 1977
- Affiliation: International Kabaddi Federation
- President: Tulsi Thapa
- Secretary: Arbind Kumar Jha
- (Nepal)

The All Nepal Kabaddi Association (ANKA) is the governing body for the sport of kabaddi in Nepal. It is responsible for organizing national tournaments, promoting the sport, and managing the national kabaddi teams.

== History ==
The ANKA was established to develop and promote kabaddi in Nepal. Over the years, it has played a crucial role in popularizing the sport and organizing various national and international tournaments.

== Tournaments and competitions ==
ANKA organizes several national tournaments, including the Nepal Kabaddi League (NKL), which involves six franchise teams representing Kathmandu, Pokhara, Biratnagar, Janakpur, Dhangadhi, and Butwal. The league is sponsored by Astrionix and is expected to boost the popularity of kabaddi in Nepal.

== International representation ==
The Nepal national kabaddi team, managed by ANKA, has participated in various international competitions, including the World Cup, Asian Games, and Asian Kabaddi Championship. The team has achieved notable success, winning medals in several international tournaments.

=== Women's Kabaddi ===
ANKA has also been working towards promoting women's kabaddi in Nepal. The women's team has won medals in the South Asian Games and made a debut with a bronze medal at the 19th Asian Games in Hangzhou, China.

=== Current title holders ===
Competition	Year	Champions	Title	Next edition
Senior (men's)
Nepal Kabaddi League (NKL)	2025	Janakpur Knights	NKL Champion	2026
Senior (women's)
20th Women's National Kabaddi Championship	2025	APF Club	National Kabaddi Champion	TBD

== Leadership ==
As of the latest election held on July 11, 2023, the leadership of ANKA includes:

Position	Name
President	Tulsi Thapa
Vice-President	Kumar Aale Ratia Rajbanshi
Secretary General	Arbind Kumar Jha
Secretary	Tarkaraj Bhatt
Treasurer	Krishna Dev Pant
Members	Tej Bahadur Bista, Nirajan Shrestha, Janak Chaudhary, Jai Bahadur Bohora, Bindu Thapa Magar, Bhagwati Adhikari, Nirmala Kumari B.C., Sharad Darshandhari, Raj Kumar Chhetri, Umalal Yadav, Dhirendra Rajbangshi

== See also ==
- Nepal national kabaddi team
- Nepal women's national kabaddi team
- Sports in Nepal
- Nepal Kabaddi League
- 2025 Nepal Kabaddi League
- 2026 Nepal Kabaddi League
