= Nepal women's national 3x3 team =

National 3x3 basketball team

Nepal
- FIBA zone: FIBA Asia

FIBA 3x3 World Championships
- Appearances: 1 (2012)
- Medals: None

Asian Championships
- Appearances: 1 (2013)
- Medals: None

The Nepal women's national 3x3 team is a national basketball team of Nepal, administered by the Nepal Basketball Association. It represents the country in international 3x3 (3 against 3) women's basketball competitions.

== See also ==
- Nepal women's national basketball team
- Nepal men's national 3x3 team
