= 2018 Nepal Basketball League season =

2018 Nepal Basketball League
- League: Nepal Basketball League
- Sport: Basketball
- Duration: 17 February 2018 - 31 March 2018
- Games: 60
- Teams: 8
- Season champions: Golden Gate International College
- Runners-up: Nepal Army Club

Seasons
- 2019 →

2018 Nepal Basketball League also known as Kwiks Basketball League for sponsorship reasons, was the first season of Nepal Basketball League. The league began on 17 February 2018 and ended on 31 March 2018.

Golden Gate International College were crowned the first champions after beating Nepal Army Club 97-96 in the final.

== Teams ==
Team	Head Coach	Court	City
Bishal Milan Kendra	Abhishek KC	Bishal Milan Kendra	Kathmandu
Golden Gate International College	Bipeen Kapali	Golden Gate International College	Kathmandu
Himalayan Hounds	Raju Acharya	Shankar Dev Campus	Kathmandu
ANK Kirtipur	Rabindra Maharjan	Naya Bazaar Club	Kirtipur
Nepal Army Club	Yaman Gurung	Army Officer's Club	Kathmandu
South Siders	Ashish KC	St. Xavier's College	Kathmandu
Team Budhanilkantha	Upendra Rawat	Golfutar Youth Club	Budhanilkantha
Xavier International College	Nirupesh Shrestha	Xavier International College	Kathmandu

== Regular season ==
=== League table ===
Teams	P	W	L	PCT	GB	Home	Road
Nepal Army Club	14	13	1	0.929	0	7-0	6-1
Golden Gate International College	14	10	4	0.714	3	5-2	5-2
Bishal Milan Kendra	14	9	5	0.643	4	5-2	4-3
Himalayan Hounds	14	8	6	0.571	5	3-4	5-2
AMK Kirtipur	14	7	7	0.500	6	4-3	3-4
South Siders	14	4	10	0.286	9	3-4	1-6
Team Budhanilkantha	14	3	11	0.214	10	1-6	2-5
Xavier International College	14	2	12	0.143	11	1-6	1-6

- Top 4 teams qualified for the playoffs

=== Results ===
Home \ Away	BMK	BNK	GGIC	HOU	KIR	NAC	SID	XIC
Bishal Milan Kendra	—	80–65	70–63	57–68	68–57	92–111	70–61	84–77
Team Budhanilkantha	69–88	—	76–92	75–79	67–75	84–89	59–56	73–82
Golden Gate International College	82–88	89–52	—	73–78	81–65	90–85	80–66	75–59
Himalayan Hounds	57–61	78–60	50–94	—	57–73	50–71	60–56	88–57
ANK Kirtipur	60–51	71–75	56–66	84–83	—	64–111	47–45	64–57
Nepal Army Club	87–73	89–76	88–50	83–58	84–61	—	80–72	92–59
South Siders	69–66	66–67	63–76	59–65	67–57	68–86	—	73–67
Xavier International College	75–77	63–56	56–71	59–64	83–85	73–93	57–69	—

Source: Arko Network
Legend: Blue = home team win; Red = away team win.

== Playoffs ==
Semi-finals
28 March
Nepal Army Club	105
Himalayan Hounds	79
28 March
Golden Gate	113
Bishal Milan Kendra	79

Final
31 March
Nepal Army Club	96
Golden Gate	97
Third place
31 March
Bishal Milan Kendra	80
Himalayan Hounds	70

=== Semi-finals ===
28 March 2018
9:00 NST

Report

Nepal Army Club	105–79	Himalayan Hounds
Scoring by quarter: 29 - 11, 19 - 17, 28 - 23, 29 - 28
Pts: Sadhish Pradhan 23; Rebs: Ashish Basnet 6 Asts: Ashish Basnet 1		Pts: Mabindra Bhandari 22; Rebs: Mabindra Bhandari 12; Asts: Saurav Shrestha 2

Army Officer's Club, Kathmandu

28 March 2018
16:00 NST

Report

Golden Gate International College	113–79	Bishal Milan Kendra
Scoring by quarter: 29 - 20, 32 - 11, 29 - 29, 23 - 19
Pts: Bipendra Maharjan 37; Rebs: Anish Shahi Thakuri 18; Asts: Bipenra Maharjan 9		Pts: Bibek Shrestha 17; Rebs: Bibek Shrestha 19; Asts: Bikash Gurung 6

Golden Gate International College, Kathmandu

=== Third place ===
31 March 2018
11:00 NST

Report

Bishal Milan Kendra	80–70	Himalayan Houndds
Scoring by quarter: 18-18, 20-21, 20-14, 22-19
Pts: Bikash Gurung 30; Rebs: Bimal Jung Karki 10; Asts: Sashwat Bikram Singh 2		Pts: Bijay Burja 26; Rebs: Manish KC 18; Asts: Mabindra Bhandari 3

NSC Covered Hall, Kathmandu

=== Final ===
31 March 2018
14:00 NST

Report

Nepal Army Club	96–97	Golden Gate International College
Scoring by quarter: 21-21, 23-33, 20-20, 32-23
Pts: Binod Maharjan 19; Rebs: Binod Maharjan 13; Asts: Rabin Khatri 8		Pts: Rajiv Joshi 20

NSC Covered Hall, Kathmandu

== Statistics ==
=== Individual statistic leaders ===
Category	Player	Team	Statistic
Points per game	Bikash Gurung	Bishal Milan Kendra	24.2
Rebounds per game	Anish Shahi Thakuri	Golden Gate	13.4
Assists per game	Rabin Khatri	Nepal Army Club	7.8
Steals per game	Sandesh Tamang	Bishal Milan Kendra	4.80
Blocks per game	Diveshwar Shah	AMK Kirtipur	2.30
Turnovers per game	Saurav Shrestha	Himalayan Hounds	4.50
Fouls per game	Subrat Raj Upadhyay	South Siders	3.60
Fouls per game	Saugat Deep Singh	Team Budhanilkantha	3.60
FG%	Ajay Manandhar	Nepal Army Club	79.07%
Double-doubles	Bibek Shrestha	Bishal Milan Kendra	10
Triple-doubles	Binod Maharjan	Nepal Army Club	1

== See also ==
- Nepal national basketball team
- 2019 Nepal Basketball League season
