= SABA Women's Championship =

- Current season, competition or edition: 2025 SABA Women's Championship
- Founded: 2016
- Country: SABA member nations
- Continent: FIBA Asia (Asia)
- Most recent champion: India (1st title)
- Most titles: Sri Lanka (2 titles)

The SABA Women's Championship is a basketball tournament for women's national teams organized by the South Asia Basketball Association, a sub-zone of the FIBA Asia.

Following the disappointment of not able to play basketball at the 2016 South Asian Games, the newly created tournament marks the beginning of another step in basketball development for South Asia region. India are the current champions by defending their title in the 2025 edition.

== Summary ==
Year	Host	Final			Third Place Game		
Year	Host	Champion	Score	Second Place	Third Place	Score	Fourth Place
2016; Details	(Nepal); Kathmandu	Sri Lanka	No playoffs	Nepal	Maldives	No playoffs	Bhutan
2022; Details	(Maldives); Malé	Sri Lanka	No playoffs	Nepal	Maldives	No playoffs	Bhutan
2025; Details	(India); New Delhi	India	107–32	Maldives	Nepal	No playoffs	

== Medal table ==
Rank	Nation	Gold	Silver	Bronze	Total
1	Sri Lanka	2	0	0	2
2	India	1	0	0	1
3	Nepal	0	2	1	3
4	Maldives	0	1	2	3
Totals (4 entries)		3	3	3	9

== Participating nations ==
Nation	(Nepal) 2016	(Maldives) 2022	(India) 2025	Years
Bangladesh	5th	—	—	1
Bhutan	4th	4th	—	2
India	—	—	1st	1
Maldives	3rd	3rd	2nd	3
Nepal	2nd	2nd	3rd	3
Sri Lanka	1st	1st	—	2
Total	5	4	3	

== See also ==
- SABA Championship
- FIBA Women's Asia Cup
- Basketball at the Asian Games
- Basketball at the South Asian Games
- SAFF Women's Championship
- CAVA Women's Volleyball Nations League
