= Mucha Mori =

Japanese basketball player (born 1988)

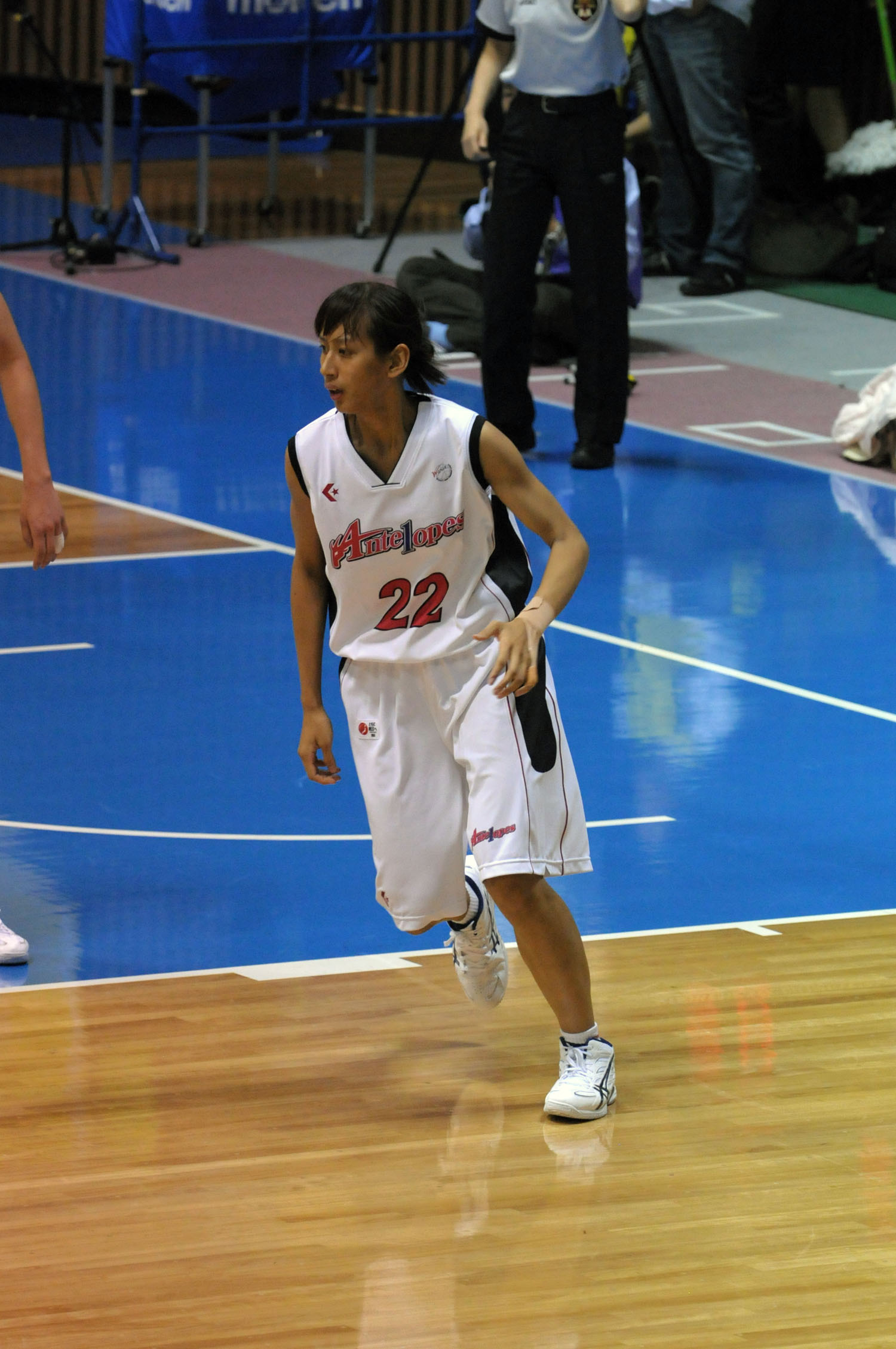
- Mori in 2011

Toyota Antelopes
- Position: Center
- League: Women's Japan Basketball League

Personal information
- Born: November 1, 1988 (age 38) Kawasaki, Kanagawa
- Listed height: 1.80 m (5 ft 11 in)

Career information
- High school: Nakamuragakuen Girls' High School
- College: Takushoku University

Medal record

Women's basketball

Representing Japan

Asian Games
Bronze medal – third place	2014 Incheon	Team competition

Mucha Mori (森 ムチャ, Mori Mucha; born November 1, 1988 in Kawasaki, Kanagawa, Japan) is a Japanese basketball player, who plays center for the Toyota Antelopes in the Women's Japan Basketball League.

== Career ==
While attending Takushoku University, she led her team to its first national championship in 2008, and was named the year's most valuable player. Takushoku was again victorious in 2010, with Mori earning her second MVP honors. While at university, she played on the national team at both the 2007 and 2009 Summer Universiade.

After graduating in 2011, Mori joined the Toyota Antelopes in the WJBL, helping them finish second in both the 2011–2012 and 2012–2013 seasons. The Antelopes won their first Empress's Cup in 2013.

In 2013, she was selected to the national team for that year's FIBA Asia Championship for Women.

== Personal ==
Mori has a Japanese father and a Filipino mother.
