= Nepal men's national under-18 basketball team =

Nepal
- FIBA zone: FIBA Asia
- National federation: Nepal Basketball Association

U19 World Championship
- Appearances: None

U18 Asia Championship
- Appearances: None

The Nepal men's national under-18 basketball team is a national basketball team of Nepal, governed by the Nepal Basketball Association. It represents the country in international under-18 basketball competitions. Recently, they participated at the 2018 FIBA U18 Asian Championship - SABA Qualifier.

== See also ==
- Nepal national basketball team
- Nepal men's national under-16 basketball team
