= Nepal Basketball Association =

Basketball governing council

- Sport: Basketball
- Jurisdiction: Nepal
- Abbreviation: NeBA
- Founded: 1989; 37 years ago
- Affiliation: FIBA
- Regional affiliation: FIBA Asia
- Affiliation date: 2000
- Headquarters: Kathmandu, Nepal
- President: Bhim Singh Gurung
- Secretary: Narendra Thapa

Official website
- www.basketball.com.np
- (Nepal)

The Nepali Basketball Association (NeBA) (Nepali: नेपाल बास्केटबल संघ (नेबा) is the governing body of basketball in Nepal.

== Background ==
The Nepal Basketball Association was established and registered in 1989 AD with National Sports Council of Nepal. It is affiliated with International Basketball Federation (FIBA), Asian Basketball Federation (FIBA ASIA), and Nepal Olympic Committee (NOC). NeBA promotes sportsmanship and peace through basketball while also following and honoring the Olympic movement, and it is working hard to develop basketball in Nepal. The current President of NeBA is Bhim Singh Gurung.

== National teams ==
Men's

- Nepal men's national basketball team
- Nepal men's national under-18 basketball team
- Nepal men's national under-16 basketball team
- Nepal men's national 3x3 team

Women's

- Nepal women's national basketball team
- Nepal women's national under-16 basketball team
- Nepal women's national 3x3 team

== Leagues ==
- Nepal Basketball League
- National Basketball League Nepal
