= Bhutan women's national basketball team =

Bhutan
- FIBA ranking: NR (18 March 2026)
- Joined FIBA: 1983
- FIBA zone: FIBA Asia
- National federation: Bhutan Basketball Federation

Olympic Games
- Appearances: None

World Cup
- Appearances: None

Asia Cup
- Appearances: None

The Bhutan women's national basketball team represents the country in women's basketball in international tournaments.

First formed around September 2015 through try-outs, The national team was set to make its debut in an international tournament at the 2016 South Asian Games and was to be led by head coach Mike Behnke, but the basketball event was cancelled.

== Competitions ==
=== SABA Championship ===
- 2016: 4th
- 2022: 4th

=== South Asian Games ===
- 2019: 4th

== Coaches ==
- (United States) Mike Behnke (2015–2016)
