= 2019 Nepal Basketball League season =

2019 Nepal Basketball League
- League: Nepal Basketball League
- Sport: Basketball
- Duration: 20 April 2019 - 21 June 2019
- Games: 65
- Teams: 8
- Season champions: The Times International Club (1st title)
- Runners-up: Nepal Army Club
- Season MVP: (Nepal) Sadish Pradhan (Times)

Seasons
- ← 2018 2020 →

The 2019 Nepal Basketball League also known as Kwiks Basketball League for sponsorship reasons, was the second season of Nepal Basketball League. The league began on 20 April 2019.

A total of eight teams took part in the league which ran for 55 days, making it the biggest and longest basketball tournament of the country.

The Times International Club secured their first title after defeating Nepal Army Club in the final.

== Teams ==
Team	Court	City
Budhanilkantha Municipality Basketball Club	Golfutar Basketball Court	Budanilkantha
Golden Gate International Club	Golden Gate International College	Kathmandu
Kirtipur Basketball Club	Naya Bazaar Club	Kirtipur
Nepal Police Club	National Police Academy	Kathmandu
Royal Basketball Club	Royal Basketball Academy	Lalitpur
South Siders Basketball Club	St Xavier's College	Kathmandu
The Times International Club	The Times International College	Kathmandu
Tribhuwan Army Club	Army Officer's Club	Kathmandu

== Regular season ==
=== League table ===
Pos	Team	Pld	W	L	PF	PA	PD	Qualification or relegation
1	Tribhuwan Army Club (Q)	14	13	1	1217	989	+228	Qualification to playoffs
2	The Times International Club (Q)	14	12	2	1122	930	+192	Qualification to playoffs
3	Golden Gate International Club (Q)	14	8	6	1143	1085	+58	Qualification to playoffs
4	Nepal Police Club (Q)	14	7	7	1088	1039	+49	Qualification to playoffs
5	Budhanilkantha Municipality	14	7	7	975	994	−19	
6	Royal Basketball Club	14	5	9	1016	1093	−77	
7	AMK Kirtipur	14	3	11	919	1103	−184	
8	South Siders	14	1	13	880	1127	−247	

Source: NBL
(Q) Qualified for the phase indicated

=== Results ===
Home \ Away	BMBC	GGIC	KBC	NPC	RBC	SSBC	TAC	TTIC
Budhanilkantha Municipality	—	72–85	70–56	78–76	98–68	85–59	64–79	66–81
Golden Gate International College	98–79	—	86–52	70–79	103–84	104–65	69–104	58–72
AMK Kirtipur	74–90	67–89	—	60–84	61–72	74–71	77–89	58–66
Nepal Police Club	68–74	96–82	86–88	—	109–68	78–58	81–89	70–63
Royal Basketball Club	20–0	100–105	61–63	75–59	—	85–74	85–97	69–80
South Siders	66–76	62–83	66–59	63–74	62–70	—	71–92	65–77
Tribhuwan Army Club	86–46	75–61	78–58	75–67	98–90	92–51	—	67–66
The Times International College	83–77	78–55	95–72	96–61	84–69	78–47	103–96	—

Source: NBL
Legend: Blue = home team win; Red = away team win.

== Playoffs ==
Preliminary
1	Tribhuwan Army Club	2
2	The Times International Club	1
3	Golden Gate International Club	0
4	Nepal Police Club	2

Preliminary
Q1L	The Times International Club	2
EW	Nepal Police Club	0

Final
Q1W	Tribhuwan Army Club	71
Q2W	The Times International Club	88

=== (1) Tribhuwan Army Club vs. (2) The Times International Club ===
16 June 2019
19:00 NST

Tribhuwan Army Club	79–65	The Times International Club
Scoring by quarter: 26-13, 22-20, 9-17, 22-15
Army leads series, 1-0

NSC Covered Hall, Kathmandu

17 June 2019
19:00 NST

The Times International Club	81–57	Tribhuwan Army Club
Scoring by quarter: 18-13, 22-14, 20-12, 21-18
Series tied, 1-1

NSC Covered Hall, Kathmandu

18 June 2019
19:00 NST

Tribhuwan Army Club	69–61	The Times International Club
Scoring by quarter: 18-12, 13-18, 15-15, 23-16
Army wins series, 2-1

NSC Covered Hall, Kathmandu

=== (3) Golden Gate International Club vs. (4) Nepal Police Club ===
16 June 2019
17:00 NST

Golden Gate International Club	72–78	Nepal Police Club
Scoring by quarter: 22-20, 22-21, 12-13, 16-24
Police leads series, 1-0

NSC Covered Hall, Kathmandu

17 June 2019
17:00 NST

Nepal Police Club	90–65	Golden Gate International Club
Scoring by quarter: 13-21, 24-9, 33-8, 20-27
Police wins series, 2-0

NSC Covered Hall, Kathmandu

=== (2) The Times International Club vs. (4) Nepal Police Club ===
19 June 2019
19:00 NST

The Times International Club	81–69	Nepal Police Club
Scoring by quarter: 24-12, 14-24, 19-13, 24-20
Times leads series, 1-0

NSC Covered Hall, Kathmandu

20 June 2019
19:00 NST

Nepal Police Club	54–72	The Times International Club
Scoring by quarter: 14-12, 7-17, 24-24, 18-9
Times wins series, 2-0

NSC Covered Hall, Kathmandu

=== Final: (1) Tribhuwan Army Club vs. (2) The Times International Club ===
21 June 2019
19:00 NST

Tribhuwan Army Club	71–88	The Times International Club
Scoring by quarter: 12-19, 12-21, 26-27, 21-21

NSC Covered Hall, Kathmandu

== Season statistics ==
=== Regular season ===
Category	Player	Team	Statistic
Points per game	Saurav Shrestha	Budhanilkantha Municipality	22.1
Rebounds per game	Bikram Joshi	The Times International	11.8
Assists per game	Rabin Khatri	Nepal Army Club	4.5
Steals per game	Nikesh Rakhal Magar	Royal Basketball Club	1.9
Blocks per game	Bikram Joshi	The Times International	1.7
Turnovers per game	Saurav Shrestha	Budhanilkantha Municipality	3.5
Fouls per game	Bimal Karki	Nepal Police Club	0.9

== Women's Nepal Basketball League ==
2019 Women's Nepal Basketball League
- League: Women's Nepal Basketball League
- Sport: Basketball
- Duration: 1 April 2019 - 22 June 2019
- Games: 13
- Teams: 4
- Season champions: Nepal Police Club (1st title)
- Runners-up: Samriddhi Gorillas
- Season MVP: (Nepal) Anusha Malla (Police)

Seasons
- 2020 →

The 2019 Women's Nepal Basketball League was the first season of the Women's Nepal Basketball League. Four teams took part in the inaugural season which began on 1 June.

Nepal Police Club became the inaugural champions after defeating Samridhhi Gorilas in the final.

=== Teams ===
- Iso Kite
- Nepal Police Club
- Saipal Academy
- Samriddhi Gorillas

=== Regular season ===
==== League table ====
Pos	Team	Pld	W	L	PF	PA	PD	Qualification or relegation
1	Samriddhi Gorilla (Q)	6	5	1	283	261	+22	Qualification to Final
2	Nepal Police Club (Q)	6	3	3	367	318	+49	Qualification to Final
3	ISO Kite	6	3	3	358	375	−17	
4	Saipal Academy	6	1	5	319	373	−54	

Source: NBL
(Q) Qualified for the phase indicated

==== Results ====
Home \ Away	ISO	NPC	SAI	GOR
ISO Kite	—	64–62	72–60	44–54
Nepal Police Club	76–63	—	71–58	46–49
Saipal Academy	63–72	45–77	—	22–40
Samriddhi Gorilla	60–43	39–35	41–71	—

Source: NBL
Legend: Blue = home team win; Red = away team win.

=== Final ===
21 June 2019
12:00 NST

Samriddhi Gorillas	52–65	Nepal Police Club
Scoring by quarter: 12-8, 17-14, 13-22, 10-21

NSC Covered Hall, Kathmandu

== See also ==
- Nepal national basketball team
- 2018 Nepal Basketball League season
