= Sneha Shrestha =

Nepalese basketball player

Personal information
- Born: March 21, 1995 (age 31)
- Listed height: 5 ft 9 in (1.75 m)

Career information
- College: Prime College
- Playing career: 2010–present
- Position: Forward-center
- Number: 4

Sneha Shrestha (Nepali: स्नेहा श्रेष्ठ; born 1 March 1995) is a Nepalese basketball player who represents the Nepal women's national basketball team. She started playing in national games since 2010. She participated in South Asian Basketball competition and also won a silver medal.
