= Prime College =

Nepali college

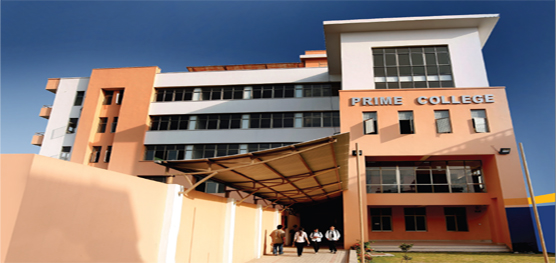
- Prime College
- Motto: INITIATE | EXPLORE | INNOVATE
- Type: Private
- Established: 2001
- Accreditation: Higher Secondary Education Board Tribhuvan University
- Chairperson: Vijay Bahadur Shrestha
- Principal: Bigendra Lal Shrestha
- Location: Khusibun, Nayabazar, Kathmandu, Nepal
- Colours: Orange & blue
- Website: prime.edu.np

Prime College is an information technology, management, and science college in Nayabazar (Khusibu) Kathmandu, Nepal, established in 2001. The college offers courses for BBA (Bachelor of Business Administration), BIM (Bachelor of Information Management), BBS (Bachelor of Business Studies) B.Sc. (CSIT) (are affiliated with the Tribhuvan University of Nepal) and CCNA (Cisco Certified Network Associate).

The college covers eight ropanis of land in a city center and has three buildings, 35 rooms, two computer labs, two computer-aided libraries, and an audio-visual room. The library has a collection of 10,200 books, magazines and journals.

== History ==
The college was established in 2001, as Nepal's First IT-enabled College. Initially, Prime College introduced +2 Management (Intermediate Level), Bachelor of Information Management (Under Graduate Level) in 2001. The college then introduced the Bachelor of Business Administration (BBA) degree in 2003. By the year 2005, +2 Science and another undergraduate program Bachelor of Business Studies (BBS) were introduced. Likewise, in 2009 Bachelor of Science in Computer Science and Information Technology (B.Sc. (CSIT)) was introduced. Now there is a total of two intermediate programs and four undergraduate programs in Prime College.

Initially in 2002, the college started its international partnership with Cisco Certified Network Associate (CCNA). Later in 2007 partnership with NREN had started, and in 2013 with Microsoft Innovation Centre Nepal. It also maintains partnership with CODEWITZ.

== Academics ==
=== Library ===
Prime College Library has books, journals, magazines, CD-ROMs on Information Technology, Management, Economics, Sociology, Psychology, Mathematics, Statistics, Physics, Chemistry, English etc.

Prime College has implemented Online Public Access Catalogue (OPAC) in its library. OPAC is made available on the college LAN and the users can search by Author's name, title, subject, and keywords.

=== Computing ===
There are two computer labs with wireless network, two Super Micro servers, one QNAP server and one IBM server and two Dell servers. The labs have computers on a LAN running with a dedicated file server. The computer labs are equipped with Gigabit Ethernet (1000 Mbit/s) for multimedia and video network.

=== Ranking ===
In 2013, Prime College was awarded as the Eighth Best Business School in National Business School Rating- Ranking Award 2013 organized by Aarthik Abhiyan National Daily and New Business Age English monthly among all Business Schools of Nepal.

It received +2 Best Performance Award in the ninth Annual WaiWai Educational Award 2070 organized by Aajako Awaaz Media (AMM) for achievements in Intermediate level.

== Faculties ==
1. +2 Management: Hotel Management, Travel & Tourism, Business Studies, Economics and others.
2. +2 Science: Biology, Physics, Chemistry, Mathematics and others.
3. Bachelor of Business Administration (BBA): Banking and Finance, Industrial Management, Marketing Management, Management Information System, Ecommerce and others.
4. Bachelor of Information Management (BIM): Object Oriented Programming, Web Technology, JAVA Programming, Client Server Computing, Software project management and others.
5. Bachelor of Business Studies (BBS): Cost and Management Accounting, Financial Management, Management Science, Marketing Management and others.
6. Bachelor of Science in Computer Science and Information Technology: Micro Processor, E-governance, Web Centric Computing, Advance Java Programming and others.
7. Bachelors in Computer Applications (BCA)
8. Bachelors in Business Management (BBM)
9. Masters in Business Studies (MBS)

== Worldwide partners ==
1. NREN: Nepal Research and Education Network (NREN) has been established as a facilitator to support for advanced research and education network through the means of Information and Communication Technology and as a knowledge center to support good ICT initiatives and researchers in the country.
2. CISCO: Prime College is a certified Cisco Local Academy, running the Cisco Networking Academy Program (CNAP).
3. Microsoft Innovation Center Nepal - Innovation Center Prime: MICNIC Prime (Microsoft Innovation Center Nepal- Innovation Center Prime) provides access to resources to students, faculty, software developers, IT professionals and entrepreneurs. This cell focuses on building skills and intellectual capital through training courses, employment programs and mentoring experiences.
