= Nepal Basketball League =

- Current season, competition or edition: 2019 Nepal Basketball League season
- Sport: Basketball
- Founded: 2018
- First season: 2018
- No. of teams: 8
- Country: Nepal
- Most recent champion: The Times International Club (1st title) (2019)
- Most titles: Golden Gate International Club; The Times International Club (1 title)

Women's Nepal Basketball League
- Current season, competition or edition: 2019 Nepal Basketball League season
- Sport: Basketball
- Founded: 2019
- First season: 2019
- No. of teams: 4
- Country: Nepal
- Most recent champion: Nepal Police Club (1st title) (2019)
- Most titles: Nepal Police Club (1 title)

The Nepal Basketball League (नेपाल बास्केटबल लिग), also known as Kwiks Basketball League for sponsorship reasons, is a basketball league in Nepal, comprising 10 men's teams and 4 women's teams.

The league was founded in 2018 and held its first season in the same year. The league also introduced the Women's Nepal Basketball League from its second season in 2019.

== Teams ==
=== Current Nepal Basketball League teams ===
Team	Court	First season	City
Budhanilkantha Municipality Basketball Club	Golfutar Basketball Court	2018	Budanilkantha
Golden Gate International Club	Golden Gate International College	2018	Kathmandu
Kirtipur Basketball Club	Naya Bazaar Club	2018	Kirtipur
Nepal Police Club	National Police Academy	2019	Kathmandu
Royal Basketball Club	Royal Basketball Academy	2019	Lalitpur
South Siders Basketball Club	St Xavier's College	2018	Kathmandu
The Times International Club	The Times International College	2019	Kathmandu
Tribhuwan Army Club	Army Officer's Club	2018	Kathmandu
Hounds Academy	Surya Futsal	2023	Kathmandu
Rasagya Nets	Bhangal Basketball Court	2023	Budhanilkantha

=== Current Women's Nepal Basketball League teams ===
Team	First season
Iso Kite	2019
Nepal Police Club	2019
Saipal Academy	2019
Samriddhi Gorillas	2019

=== Former teams ===
Team	Court	Duration	City
Bishal Milan Kendra	Bishal Milan Kendra	2018	Kathmandu
Himalayan Hounds	Shankar Dev Campus	2018	Kathmandu
Xavier International College	Xavier International College	2018	Kathmandu

== Summary ==
Season	Nepal Basketball League			Women's Nepal Basketball League		
Season	Champion	Score	Runner-up	Champion	Score	Runner-up
2018	Golden Gate International College	97–96	Nepal Army Club	—		
2019	The Times International Club	88–71	Nepal Army Club	Nepal Police Club	65–52	Samriddhi Gorillas

== Titles by club ==
=== Nepal Basketball League ===
Club	Champions	Runners-up	Third Place
Golden Gate International Club	1 (2018)	—	—
The Times International Club	1 (2019)	—	—
Nepal Army Club	—	2 (2018, 2019)	—
Bishal Milan Kendra	—	—	1 (2018)
Nepal Police Club	—	—	1 (2019)

=== Women's Nepal Basketball League ===
Club	Champions	Runners-up
Nepal Police Club	1 (2019)	—
Samriddhi Gorillas	—	1 (2019)

== See also ==
- Nepal national basketball team
