= Nepal women's national basketball team =

Nepal
- FIBA ranking: 110 (18 March 2026)
- Joined FIBA: 2000
- FIBA zone: FIBA Asia
- National federation: Nepal Basketball Association
- Coach: Bikash Shahi

Olympic Games
- Appearances: None

World Cup
- Appearances: None

Asian Games
- Appearances: 1
- Medals: None

Asia Cup
- Appearances: None
Home	Away

The Nepal women's national basketball team represents Nepal in international women's basketball competitions and is managed by the Nepal Basketball Association (NeBA).

Nepal joined FIBA in 2000.

== Current roster ==
Nepal roster at the 2016 SABA Women's Championship:

Nepal women's national basketball team - 2016 SABA Women's Championship roster
Players
Coaches

Pos.	No.	Name	Age – Date of birth	Height	Club
F/C	4	Sneha Shrestha	21 – March 1, 1995	5 ft 10 in (1.78 m)	Prime College	(Nepal)
F	2	Shreya Khadka	20 – December 17, 1995	5 ft 6 in (1.68 m)	Tribhuvan Army Club	(Nepal)
SG	6	Maya Shyangtan	–	5 ft 5 in (1.65 m)	Tribhuvan Army Club	(Nepal)
SG	7	Gyanu Gauchan	26 – September 6, 1989	5 ft 5 in (1.65 m)	Tribhuvan Army Club	(Nepal)
F	8	Alina Gurung	–	5 ft 9 in (1.75 m)	Tribhuvan Army Club	(Nepal)
PG	9	Sujata Rai	21 – August 8, 1994	5 ft 6 in (1.68 m)	Tribhuvan Army Club	(Nepal)
F	10	Preeti Tulachan	25 – July 20, 1990	5 ft 6 in (1.68 m)	Tribhuvan Army Club	(Nepal)
SG	11	Bhawana Lama	–	5 ft 5 in (1.65 m)	Tribhuvan Army Club	(Nepal)
F	12	Alisha Malla	23 – September 27, 1992	5 ft 8 in (1.73 m)	Tribhuvan Army Club	(Nepal)
C	13	Sadina Shrestha (c)	26 – November 23, 1989	5 ft 10 in (1.78 m)	Prime College	(Nepal)
C	14	Luniva Singh	21 – December 19, 1994	5 ft 10 in (1.78 m)	Prime College	(Nepal)
PG	77	Anusha Malla	20 – July 24, 1995	5 ft 8 in (1.73 m)	Tribhuvan Army Club	(Nepal)

Head coach

- (Nepal) Bikash Shahi

Legend

- (C) Team captain
- Club field describes current pro club
- Age denotes as of March 29, 2016

== Tournament record ==
=== Asian Games ===
Year	Round	Position	Pld	W	L
1974-1998	Did not enter (no team)				
2002-2010	Did not enter				
(South Korea) 2014	Qualifying Round	10/11	4	1	3
(Indonesia) 2018	Did not enter				

==== 3x3 ====
Year	Round	Position	Pld	W	L
(Indonesia) 2018	Preliminary Round	14/16	3	0	3

=== SABA Championship ===
- 2016: (silver)
- 2022: (silver)
- 2025: (bronze)

=== South Asian Games ===
- 2019: (silver)
