= 2019 FIBA Women's Asia Cup squads =

This article displays the rosters for the teams competing at the 2019 FIBA Women's Asia Cup. Each team had to submit 12 players.

Age and club as of 24 September 2019.

== Group A ==
=== Chinese Taipei ===
Chinese Taipei women's national basketball team roster
Players
Coaches

Pos.	No.	Name	Age – Date of birth	Height	Club	Ctr.
F	1	Han Ya-en	24 – 1 January 1995	1.80 m (5 ft 11 in)	Cathay Life	(Chinese Taipei)
G	5	Huang Fan-shan	31 – 29 September 1987	1.74 m (5 ft 9 in)	Cathay Life	(Chinese Taipei)
G	6	Chan Wei-an	23 – 1 November 1995	1.76 m (5 ft 9 in)	Cathay Life	(Chinese Taipei)
F	9	Huang Ping-jen	29 – 6 November 1989	1.78 m (5 ft 10 in)	Hebei Win Power	(China)
C	10	Tsai Pei-chen	35 – 27 May 1984	1.86 m (6 ft 1 in)	Taiyuan Textile	(Chinese Taipei)
F	12	Wu Ying-chieh	26 – 3 November 1992	1.77 m (5 ft 10 in)	Taiyuan Textile	(Chinese Taipei)
C	13	Cheng I-hsiu	26 – 24 June 1993	1.78 m (5 ft 10 in)	Cathay Life	(Chinese Taipei)
G	17	Huang Ling-chuan	24 – 6 December 1994	1.75 m (5 ft 9 in)	Cathay Life	(Chinese Taipei)
G	23	Peng Szu-chin	27 – 9 November 1991	1.63 m (5 ft 4 in)	Xinjiang Magic Deer	(China)
C	24	Huang Hsiang-ting	26 – 26 January 1993	1.79 m (5 ft 10 in)	Chunghwa Telecom	(Chinese Taipei)
F	27	Lin Yu-ting	25 – 25 January 1994	1.80 m (5 ft 11 in)	Cathay Life	(Chinese Taipei)
G	77	Chu Yu-chin	23 – 1 April 1996	1.62 m (5 ft 4 in)

Head coach

- (United States) Albert Kenyon Wagner

Assistant coach(es)

- (Chinese Taipei) Chien Wei-chuan
- (Chinese Taipei) Huang Shiau-jie

Legend

- Club – describes last
  club before the tournament
- Age – describes age
  on 24 September 2019

=== India ===
India women's national basketball team roster
Players
Coaches

Pos.	No.	Name	Age – Date of birth	Height	Club	Ctr.
F	4	Anjana Prasannan Geetha	24 – 9 November 1994	1.77 m (5 ft 10 in)	Kerala	(India)
PG	5	Barkha Sonkar	22 – 24 December 1996	1.58 m (5 ft 2 in)	Hillsborough Hawks	(United States)
C	6	Stephy Nixon	27 – 6 June 1992	1.84 m (6 ft 0 in)		(India)
G	7	Bhandavya Hemmige Mahesha	21 – 18 April 1998	1.66 m (5 ft 5 in)		(India)
G	8	Shruthi Arvind	23 – 22 February 1996			(India)
	9	Madhu Kumari	24 – 9 July 1995			(India)
F	10	Navaneetha Pattemane Udayakumar	25 – 28 July 1994	1.78 m (5 ft 10 in)	Railways	(India)
C	12	Rajapriyadharshini Rajaganapathi	25 – 3 January 1994	1.89 m (6 ft 2 in)	Railways	(India)
F	13	Jeena Palanilkumkalayil Skaria	25 – 9 January 1994	1.79 m (5 ft 10 in)	Kerala	(India)
F	14	Shireen Vijay Limaye	24 – 13 February 1995	1.79 m (5 ft 10 in)	Pune	(India)
C	15	Anmolpreet Kaur	19 – 24 November 1999	1.85 m (6 ft 1 in)	Tokyo Gakuen	(Japan)
	19	Lopamudra Thimmaiah Kokkalera	21 – 1 January 1998			(India)

Head coach

- (Serbia) Zoran Višić

Assistant coach(es)

- (India) Shiba Maggon

Legend

- Club – describes last
  club before the tournament
- Age – describes age
  on 24 September 2019

=== Japan ===
The squad was announced on 11 September 2019.

Japan women's national basketball team roster
Players
Coaches

Pos.	No.	Name	Age – Date of birth	Height	Club	Ctr.
SF	0	Moeko Nagaoka	25 – 29 December 1993	1.82 m (6 ft 0 in)	Toyota Antelopes	(Japan)
PF	8	Maki Takada	30 – 23 August 1989	1.83 m (6 ft 0 in)	Denso Iris	(Japan)
PF	10	Ramu Tokashiki	28 – 11 June 1991	1.93 m (6 ft 4 in)	JX-Eneos Sunflowers	(Japan)
PG	13	Rui Machida	26 – 8 March 1993	1.62 m (5 ft 4 in)	Fujitsu Red Wave	(Japan)
SG	14	Sanae Motokawa	27 – 2 April 1992	1.76 m (5 ft 9 in)	Chanson V-Magic	(Japan)
PG	15	Nako Motohashi	25 – 10 October 1993	1.65 m (5 ft 5 in)	Haneda Vickies	(Japan)
SG	27	Saki Hayashi	24 – 16 March 1995	1.73 m (5 ft 8 in)	JX-Eneos Sunflowers	(Japan)
SF	30	Evelyn Mawuli	24 – 2 June 1995	1.80 m (5 ft 11 in)	Toyota Antelopes	(Japan)
PF	33	Tamami Nakada	21 – 21 December 1997	1.83 m (6 ft 0 in)	Waseda University	(Japan)
PG	45	Aya Watanabe	27 – 12 August 1992	1.69 m (5 ft 7 in)	Mitsubishi Electric Koalas	(Japan)
SF	52	Yuki Miyazawa	26 – 2 June 1993	1.82 m (6 ft 0 in)	JX-Eneos Sunflowers	(Japan)
SG	88	Himawari Akaho	21 – 28 August 1998	1.85 m (6 ft 1 in)	Denso Iris	(Japan)

Head coach

- (United States) Tom Hovasse

Assistant coach(es)

- (Japan) Toru Onzuka

Legend

- Club – describes last
  club before the tournament
- Age – describes age
  on 24 September 2019

=== South Korea ===
South Korea women's national basketball team roster
Players
Coaches

Pos.	No.	Name	Age – Date of birth	Height	Club	Ctr.
F	1	Youm Yun-ah	32 – 13 September 1987	1.77 m (5 ft 10 in)	Cheongju KB Stars	(South Korea)
F	3	Kang Lee-seul	25 – 5 April 1994	1.80 m (5 ft 11 in)	Bucheon KEB Hana Bank	(South Korea)
PG	4	Shin Ji-hyun	24 – 12 September 1995	1.73 m (5 ft 8 in)	Bucheon KEB Hana Bank	(South Korea)
G	5	Sim Sung-young	26 – 14 October 1992	1.65 m (5 ft 5 in)	Cheongju KB Stars	(South Korea)
PF	6	Choi Eun-sil	25 – 17 August 1994	1.83 m (6 ft 0 in)	Asan Woori Bank Wibee	(South Korea)
G	7	Park Hye-jin	29 – 22 July 1990	1.78 m (5 ft 10 in)	Asan Woori Bank Wibee	(South Korea)
F	8	Kim Min-jeong	25 – 3 May 1994	1.82 m (6 ft 0 in)	Cheongju KB Stars	(South Korea)
G	9	Park Ji-hyun	19 – 7 April 2000	1.85 m (6 ft 1 in)	Asan Woori Bank Wibee	(South Korea)
C	11	Bae Hye-yoon	30 – 10 June 1989	1.82 m (6 ft 0 in)	Yongin Samsung Blueminx	(South Korea)
C	15	Kim Yeon-hee	23 – 23 May 1996	1.87 m (6 ft 2 in)	Incheon Shinhan Bank S-Birds	(South Korea)
PF	22	Ku Seul	25 – 8 March 1994	1.83 m (6 ft 0 in)	Busan BNK Sum	(South Korea)
F	31	Jin An	23 – 23 March 1996	1.85 m (6 ft 1 in)	Busan BNK Sum	(South Korea)

Head coach

- (South Korea) Lee Moon-kyu

Assistant coach(es)

- (South Korea) Ha Sook-rye

Legend

- Club – describes last
  club before the tournament
- Age – describes age
  on 24 September 2019

== Group B ==
=== Australia ===
A 16-player squad was announced on 16 August 2019. The final squad was revealed on 21 September 2019.

Australia women's national basketball team roster
Players
Coaches

Pos.	No.	Name	Age – Date of birth	Height	Club	Ctr.
G	1	Lauren Nicholson	26 – 26 March 1993	1.82 m (6 ft 0 in)	Adelaide Lightning	(Australia)
G/F	4	Jenna O'Hea (C)	32 – 6 June 1987	1.86 m (6 ft 1 in)	Southside Flyers	(Australia)
G	5	Leilani Mitchell	34 – 15 June 1985	1.65 m (5 ft 5 in)	Phoenix Mercury	(United States)
SF	6	Stephanie Talbot	25 – 15 June 1994	1.88 m (6 ft 2 in)	Minnesota Lynx	(United States)
F	7	Abby Bishop	30 – 29 November 1988	1.88 m (6 ft 2 in)	Townsville Fire	(Australia)
G/F	9	Rebecca Allen	26 – 6 November 1992	1.88 m (6 ft 2 in)	New York Liberty	(United States)
SG	10	Katie Ebzery	29 – 8 January 1990	1.79 m (5 ft 10 in)	Perth Lynx	(Australia)
PF	11	Darcee Garbin	25 – 24 June 1994	1.88 m (6 ft 2 in)	Townsville Fire	(Australia)
PF	12	Sara Blicavs	26 – 15 February 1993	1.89 m (6 ft 2 in)	Southside Flyers	(Australia)
PF	13	Ezi Magbegor	20 – 13 August 1999	1.93 m (6 ft 4 in)	Melbourne Boomers	(Australia)
F/C	15	Cayla George	30 – 1 May 1989	1.93 m (6 ft 4 in)	Melbourne Boomers	(Australia)
G	35	Nicole Seekamp	27 – 26 April 1992	1.82 m (6 ft 0 in)	Adelaide Lightning	(Australia)

Head coach

- (Australia) Sandy Brondello

Assistant coach(es)

- (Australia) Cheryl Chambers
- (Australia) Paul Goriss

Legend

- Club – describes last
  club before the tournament
- Age – describes age
  on 24 September 2019

=== China ===
The squad was announced on 22 September 2019.

China women's national basketball team roster
Players
Coaches

Pos.	No.	Name	Age – Date of birth	Height	Club	Ctr.
G	3	Yang Liwei	24 – 2 January 1995	1.76 m (5 ft 9 in)	Guangdong Vermilion Birds	(China)
G	4	Li Yuan	19 – 29 May 2000	1.70 m (5 ft 7 in)	Shandong Six Stars	(China)
G	5	Wang Siyu	23 – 16 October 1995	1.80 m (5 ft 11 in)	Shandong Six Stars	(China)
G	6	Wu Tongtong	25 – 27 June 1994	1.76 m (5 ft 9 in)	Shanxi Flame	(China)
SG	7	Shao Ting (C)	29 – 10 December 1989	1.84 m (6 ft 0 in)	Beijing Great Wall	(China)
SF	9	Guo Zixuan	22 – 16 January 1997	1.86 m (6 ft 1 in)	Shanxi Flame	(China)
PF	10	Gao Song	27 – 16 April 1992	1.90 m (6 ft 3 in)	Beijing Great Wall	(China)
PF	12	Liu Jiacen	30 – 30 March 1989	1.93 m (6 ft 4 in)	Heilongjiang Dragons	(China)
C	14	Li Yueru	20 – 28 March 1999	2.01 m (6 ft 7 in)	Guangdong Dolphins	(China)
C	15	Han Xu	19 – 31 October 1999	2.06 m (6 ft 9 in)	New York Liberty	(United States)
F/C	16	Chen Mingling	19 – 25 July 2000	1.92 m (6 ft 4 in)	Guangdong Vermilion Birds	(China)
F/C	18	Shi Xiaoye	23 – 15 November 1995	1.90 m (6 ft 3 in)

Head coach

- (China) Xu Limin

Assistant coach(es)

- (China) Zheng Wei
- (China) Jia Nan

Legend

- Club – describes last
  club before the tournament
- Age – describes age
  on 24 September 2019

=== New Zealand ===
The squad was announced on 16 September 2019.

New Zealand women's national basketball team roster
Players
Coaches

Pos.	No.	Name	Age – Date of birth	Height	Club	Ctr.
PG	2	Micaela Cocks	33 – 19 August 1986	1.74 m (5 ft 9 in)	Townsville Fire	(Australia)
F	3	Amy West	19 – 19 November 1999	1.93 m (6 ft 4 in)	St. Mary's Gaels	(United States)
F	4	Kalani Purcell	24 – 13 January 1995	1.88 m (6 ft 2 in)	Melbourne Boomers	(Australia)
F	6	Tessa Boagni	23 – 2 February 1996	1.88 m (6 ft 2 in)	Canterbury Wildcats	(New Zealand)
G	7	Antonia Farnworth	32 – 10 May 1987	1.81 m (5 ft 11 in)	Melbourne Boomers	(Australia)
SF	8	Natalie Taylor	36 – 24 December 1982	1.82 m (6 ft 0 in)	Southern Districts Spartans	(Australia)
G	9	Stella Beck	23 – 25 September 1995	1.83 m (6 ft 0 in)	Melbourne Boomers	(Australia)
G/F	10	Chevannah Paalvast	28 – 4 September 1991	1.80 m (5 ft 11 in)	Sunshine Coast Rip	(Australia)
F	12	Penina Davidson	24 – 2 September 1995	1.90 m (6 ft 3 in)	Melbourne Boomers	(Australia)
G/F	22	Ashleigh Karaitiana	27 – 26 June 1992	1.83 m (6 ft 0 in)	Southern Districts Spartans	(Australia)
G	42	Ella Fotu	23 – 1 June 1996	1.75 m (5 ft 9 in)	Harbour Breeze	(New Zealand)
G	77	Charlisse Leger-Walker	18 – 15 September 2001	1.74 m (5 ft 9 in)	Waikato Wizards	(New Zealand)

Head coach

- (Australia) Guy Molloy

Assistant coach(es)

- (New Zealand) Aik Ho
- (New Zealand) Jody Cameron

Legend

- Club – describes last
  club before the tournament
- Age – describes age
  on 24 September 2019

=== Philippines ===
The squad was announced on 19 September 2019.

Philippines women's national basketball team roster
Players
Coaches

Pos.	No.	Name	Age – Date of birth	Height	Club	Ctr.
G	00	Ana Castillo	23 – 10 May 1996	1.62 m (5 ft 4 in)	De La Salle University	(Philippines)
F	3	Afril Bernardino	23 – 3 April 1996	1.72 m (5 ft 8 in)	Valkyrie Hatchers	(Malaysia)
G	4	Maria Daez	26 – 10 May 1993	1.55 m (5 ft 1 in)	University of the Philippines	(Philippines)
G	6	France Mae Cabinbin	27 – 6 December 1991	1.52 m (5 ft 0 in)	Lyceum University	(Philippines)
G	7	Janine Pontejos	26 – 29 October 1992	1.65 m (5 ft 5 in)	Centro Escolar University	(Philippines)
F	8	Ria Nabalan	22 – 2 November 1996	1.70 m (5 ft 7 in)	National University	(Philippines)
C	10	Jack Danielle Animam	20 – 27 November 1998	1.95 m (6 ft 5 in)	National University	(Philippines)
F	12	Eunique Chan	23 – 12 December 1995	1.74 m (5 ft 9 in)	University of the East	(Philippines)
G	14	Marizze Tongco	23 – 18 October 1995	1.57 m (5 ft 2 in)	National University	(Philippines)
C	18	Danica Jose	25 – 18 March 1994	1.83 m (6 ft 0 in)	Ateneo De Manila University	(Philippines)
F	21	Kelli Hayes	23 – 22 November 1995	1.82 m (6 ft 0 in)	UCLA Bruins	(United States)
F	28	Gemma Miranda	24 – 28 February 1995	1.73 m (5 ft 8 in)	National University	(Philippines)

Head coach

- (Philippines) Patrick Aquino

Assistant coach(es)

- (Philippines) Julie Amos
- (Philippines) Paul Du
- (Philippines) Jose Garcia

Legend

- Club – describes last
  club before the tournament
- Age – describes age
  on 24 September 2019
