= 2026 Women's Basketball League Asia =

3rd edition of Women's Basketball League Asia

Tournament details
- Host country: India
- City: Bengaluru
- Dates: 20–25 October
- Teams: 6

Final positions
- Champions: (Japan) Denso Iris (1st title)
- Runners-up: (China) Sichuan Yuanda Meile
- Third place: (Chinese Taipei) Cathay Life Tigers
- Fourth place: (South Korea) Cheongju KB Stars

Tournament statistics
- Games played: 11
- MVP: Haruna Kasagi (Denso Iris)
- Top scorer: Sara Blicavs (Sichuan Yuanda Meile) (22.3 ppg)
- Top rebounds: Shelby Cheslek (Cathay Life Tigers) (11.5 rpg)
- Top assists: Mai Kawai (Denso Iris) (8.5 apg)

Official website
- 2026 Basketball Champions League Asia

The 2026 Women's Basketball League Asia (WBLA) is the third edition of the premier Asian women's basketball club competition organised by FIBA Asia. The tournament will be held at the Sree Kanteerava Indoor Stadium in Bengaluru from 20 to 25 October 2026. The first two editions, in 2024 and 2025, were held in China.

Denso Iris became the first Japanese team to win the WBLA winning 81–63 over Sichuan Yuanda Meile of China in the final. Sichuan won the inaugural edition in 2024, and Chinese team Guangdong Vermilion Birds won the 2025 title.

== Teams ==
The following teams qualified to the main tournament.

Team	Domestic league standings	Appearances
(China) Sichuan Yuanda Meile	2026 Women's Chinese Basketball Association champions	2nd
(Chinese Taipei) Cathay Life Tigers	2026 Women's Super Basketball League champions	3rd
(Japan) Denso Iris	2025–26 Women's Japan Basketball League champions	1st
(South Korea) Cheongju KB Stars	2025–26 Women's Korean Basketball League champions	1st
(India) Indian Railways	2025–26 National Basketball Championship champions	1st
(Philippines) Akari Sparks	2026 Women's Maharlika Pilipinas Basketball League champions	1st

== Venue ==
Bengaluru	2026 Women's Basketball League Asia is located in India
Sree Kanteerava Indoor Stadium	2026 Women's Basketball League Asia is located in India
Capacity:4,000	2026 Women's Basketball League Asia is located in India

== Group phase ==
The schedule and grouping was announced on 8 September 2026.

All times are local (UTC+5:30)

=== Group A ===
Pos	Team	Pld	W	L	PF	PA	PD	Pts	Qualification
1	(China) Sichuan Yuanda Meile	2	2	0	186	143	+43	4	Knockout stage
2	(Chinese Taipei) Cathay Life Tigers	2	1	1	155	167	−12	3	Knockout stage
3	(Philippines) Akari Sparks	2	0	2	148	179	−31	2	5–6 classification match

Source: FIBA
Rules for classification: 1) Points; 2) Head-to-head results; 3) Points difference; 4) Points scored.

20 October 2026
16:00

Boxscore

Sichuan Yuanda Meile (China)	92–70	(Chinese Taipei) Cathay Life Tigers
Scoring by quarter: 33–22, 22–12, 17–16, 20–20
Pts: Blicavs 22; Rebs: Gao, Jia 4 Asts: Blicavs 8		Pts: Chu 16; Rebs: Cheslek 6 Asts: Cheslek 6

Kanteerava Indoor Stadium, Bengaluru
Referees: Mohammad Taha (JOR), Bandar Jassim Al Suwaidi (QAT), Ong Jin Leong (SGP)

21 October 2026
16:00

Boxscore

Cathay Life Tigers (Chinese Taipei)	85–75	(Philippines) Akari Sparks
Scoring by quarter: 22–21, 29–15, 11–25, 23–14
Pts: Davidson 22; Rebs: Hsiao, Cheslek 10; Asts: three players 5		Pts: Grant-Allen 21; Rebs: Grant-Allen 10; Asts: Berberabe, Scott 4

Kanteerava Indoor Stadium, Bengaluru
Referees: Sergio Kassab (LBN), Bandar Jassim Al Suwaidi (QAT), Lim Wee Chun (MAS)

22 October 2026
16:00

Boxscore

Akari Sparks (Philippines)	73–94	(China) Sichuan Yuanda Meile
Scoring by quarter: 20–23, 13–30, 18–19, 22–22
Pts: Grant-Allen 22; Rebs: Grant-Allen 9 Asts: Berberabe 5		Pts: Blicavs 22; Rebs: Blicavs 9 Asts: three players 4

Kanteerava Indoor Stadium, Bengaluru
Referees: Sergio Kassab (LBN), Mohammad Taha (JOR), Watcharin Padungratchadakit (THA)

=== Group B ===
Pos	Team	Pld	W	L	PF	PA	PD	Pts	Qualification
1	(Japan) Denso Iris	2	2	0	199	100	+99	4	Knockout stage
2	(South Korea) Cheongju KB Stars	2	1	1	146	122	+24	3	Knockout stage
3	(India) Indian Railways (H)	2	0	2	77	200	−123	2	5–6 classification match

Source: FIBA
Rules for classification: 1) Points; 2) Head-to-head results; 3) Points difference; 4) Points scored.
(H) Hosts

20 October 2026
19:00

Boxscore

Denso Iris (Japan)	119–35	(India) Indian Railways
Scoring by quarter: 27–10, 31–8, 29–4, 32–13
Pts: Kasagi 23; Rebs: Sylla, Okada 7 Asts: Kawai 12		Pts: Munishkannan 8 Rebs: Thirunavukkarasu 4 Asts: Krishnamurthi 3

Kanteerava Indoor Stadium, Bengaluru
Referees: Zhiang Xiao (CHN), Sergio Kassab (LBN), Watcharin Padungratchadakit (THA)

21 October 2026
19:00

Boxscore

Indian Railways (India)	42–81	(South Korea) Cheongju KB Stars
Scoring by quarter: 9–20, 11–29, 10–17, 12–15
Pts: Kaur 17; Rebs: Kumar 10; Asts: Khotani 4		Pts: Na 18; Rebs: Song 9 Asts: Sakai 9

Kanteerava Indoor Stadium, Bengaluru
Referees: Mohammad Taha (JOR), Zhang Xiao (CHN), Ong Jin Leong (SGP)

22 October 2026
19:00

Boxscore

Cheongju KB Stars (South Korea)	65–80	(Japan) Denso Iris
Scoring by quarter: 10–21, 14–24, 18–15, 23–20
Pts: Na 15; Rebs: Sakai 4 Asts: Sakai, Heo 4		Pts: Kasagi 20; Rebs: Takada 7 Asts: Tsuneta 7

Kanteerava Indoor Stadium, Bengaluru
Referees: Bandar Jassim Al Suwaidi (QAT), Zhang Xiao (CHN), Lim Wee Chun (MAS)

== Final phase ==
=== Bracket ===
Semifinals
24 October
(China) Sichuan Yuanda Meile	93
(South Korea) Cheongju KB Stars	74
24 October
(Japan) Denso Iris	86
(Chinese Taipei) Cathay Life Tigers	78

Final
25 October
(China) Sichuan Yuanda Meile	63
(Japan) Denso Iris	81
Third place
25 October
(South Korea) Cheongju KB Stars	68
(Chinese Taipei) Cathay Life Tigers	73

==== 5–6 classification match ====
24 October 2026
13:00

Boxscore

Akari Sparks (Philippines)	86–56	(India) Indian Railways
Scoring by quarter: 21–15, 21–15, 30–12, 14–14
Pts: Scott 25; Rebs: Grant-Allen 11; Asts: Grant-Allen, Joson 5		Pts: Kumar, Munishkannan 13; Rebs: Kumar 11; Asts: Thirunavukkarasu 8

Kanteerava Indoor Stadium, Bengaluru
Referees: Zhang Xiao (CHN), Watcharin Padungratchadakit (THA), Lim Wee Chun (MAS)

==== Semifinals ====
24 October 2026
16:00

Boxscore

Sichuan Yuanda Meile (China)	93–74	(South Korea) Cheongju KB Stars
Scoring by quarter: 26–18, 25–13, 20–26, 22–17
Pts: Carter 31; Rebs: Blicavs 16; Asts: Li 8		Pts: Na 22; Rebs: Song 8 Asts: Sakai 5

Kanteerava Indoor Stadium, Bengaluru
Referees: Sergio Kassab (LBN), Rakesh Ramalingaiah (IND), Ong Jin Leong (SGP)

24 October 2026
19:00

Boxscore

Denso Iris (Japan)	86–78	(Chinese Taipei) Cathay Life Tigers
Scoring by quarter: 18–16, 30–19, 20–21, 18–22
Pts: Takada 20; Rebs: Johnson 9 Asts: Kawai 11		Pts: Davidson 30; Rebs: Cheslek 14; Asts: Cheslek 9

Kanteerava Indoor Stadium, Bengaluru
Referees: Mohammad Taha (JOR), Bandar Jassim Al Suwaidi (QAT), Prem Kumar Kanneboina (IND)

==== Third place game ====
25 October 2026
16:00

Boxscore

Cheongju KB Stars (South Korea)	68–73	(Chinese Taipei) Cathay Life Tigers
Scoring by quarter: 25–23, 9–19, 21–16, 13–15
Pts: Na 22; Rebs: Sakai 6 Asts: Heo 8		Pts: Cheslek 24; Rebs: Cheslek 16; Asts: Cheslek 12

Kanteerava Indoor Stadium, Bengaluru
Referees: Watcharin Padungratchadakit (THA), Lim Wee Chun (MAS), Ong Jin Leong (SGP)

==== Final ====
25 October 2026
19:00

Boxscore

Sichuan Yuanda Meile (China)	63–81	(Japan) Denso Iris
Scoring by quarter: 20–24, 16–19, 12–23, 15–15
Pts: Blicavs 18; Rebs: Blicavs 10; Asts: Tian, Gao 3		Pts: Takada 23; Rebs: Sylla, Akaho 5 Asts: Tsuneta 7

Kanteerava Indoor Stadium, Bengaluru
Referees: Mohammad Taha (JOR), Sergio Kassab (LBN), Bandar Jassim Al Suwaidi (QAT)

== Final ranking ==
Rank	Team	Record
1st place, gold medalist(s)	(Japan) Denso Iris	4–0
2nd place, silver medalist(s)	(China) Sichuan Yuanda Meile	3–1
3rd place, bronze medalist(s)	(Chinese Taipei) Cathay Life Tigers	2–2
4th	(South Korea) Cheongju KB Stars	1–3
5th	(Philippines) Akari Sparks	1–2
6th	(India) Indian Railways	0–3

== Awards ==
The awards were announced after the final on 25 October.

2026 Women's Basketball League Asia winner

Denso Iris
1st title

Most Valuable Player
(Japan) Haruna Kasagi

=== All-Star Five ===
Pos	Player	Club
G	(Japan) Haruna Kasagi (MVP)	(Japan) Denso Iris
C	(United States) Shelby Cheslek	(Chinese Taipei) Cathay Life Tigers
C	(Japan) Maki Takada	(Japan) Denso Iris
F	(Australia) Sara Blicavs	(China) Sichuan Yuanda Meile
F	(China) Song Gao	(China) Sichuan Yuanda Meile
