= 2025 FIBA Women's Asia Cup squads =

This article displays the rosters for the teams competing at the 2025 FIBA Women's Asia Cup. Each team had to submit 12 players.

== Group A ==
=== China ===
China women's national basketball team roster
Players
Coaches

Pos.	No.	Name	Age – Date of birth	Height	Club	Ctr.
G	1	Wang Siyu	29 – 16 October 1995	1.80 m (5 ft 11 in)	Sichuan Yuanda	(China)
G	2	Li Yuan	25 – 29 May 2000	1.70 m (5 ft 7 in)	Inner Mongolia	(China)
F	6	Yang Shuyu	23 – 6 March 2002	1.80 m (5 ft 11 in)	Guangdong Vermilion Birds	(China)
PG	7	Yang Liwei (C)	30 – 2 January 1995	1.76 m (5 ft 9 in)	Guangdong Vermilion Birds	(China)
F	10	Zhang Ru	25 – 2 September 1999	1.85 m (6 ft 1 in)	Inner Mongolia	(China)
PF	11	Huang Sijing	29 – 8 January 1996	1.90 m (6 ft 3 in)	Guangdong Vermilion Birds	(China)
F	12	Pan Zhenqi	30 – 5 July 1995	1.90 m (6 ft 3 in)	Inner Mongolia	(China)
C	15	Han Xu	25 – 31 October 1999	2.05 m (6 ft 9 in)	Sichuan Yuanda	(China)
F	16	Luo Xinyu	23 – 22 November 2001	1.88 m (6 ft 2 in)	Jiangsu Phoenix	(China)
C	19	Zhang Ziyu	18 – 2 May 2007	2.20 m (7 ft 3 in)	Shandong Six Stars	(China)
SF	24	Zhai Ruoyun	27 – 23 April 1998	1.82 m (6 ft 0 in)	Shanxi Flame	(China)
F	31	Jia Saiqi	26 – 30 December 1998	1.85 m (6 ft 1 in)	Sichuan Yuanda	(China)

Head coach

- (China) Gong Luming

Assistant coach(es)

- (France) Pierre Vincent

Legend

- (C) Team captain
- Club – describes last
  club before the tournament
- Age – describes age
  on 13 July 2025

=== Indonesia ===
Indonesia women's national basketball team roster
Players
Coaches

Pos.	No.	Name	Age – Date of birth	Height	Club	Ctr.
PG	2	Agustin Retong	29 – 24 August 1995	1.67 m (5 ft 6 in)	Surabaya Fever	(Indonesia)
PF	9	Dewa Kusuma	26 – 20 November 1998	1.76 m (5 ft 9 in)	GMC Cirebon	(Indonesia)
PF	10	Priscilla Karen (C)	29 – 20 May 1996	1.70 m (5 ft 7 in)	Surabaya Fever	(Indonesia)
SF	11	Faizzatus Shoimah	24 – 13 December 2000	1.75 m (5 ft 9 in)	GMC Cirebon	(Indonesia)
PG	12	Adelaide Wongsohardjo	23 – 12 October 2001	1.73 m (5 ft 8 in)	GMC Cirebon	(Indonesia)
PF	13	Yuni Anggraeni	31 – 28 June 1994	1.75 m (5 ft 9 in)	Sahabat Semarang	(Indonesia)
SF	14	Jesslyn Aritonang	22 – 18 July 2002	1.70 m (5 ft 7 in)	Surabaya Fever	(Indonesia)
SG	21	Nathania Orville	24 – 3 August 2000	1.76 m (5 ft 9 in)	Surabaya Fever	(Indonesia)
SG	24	Bella Hasan	19 – 6 November 2005	1.68 m (5 ft 6 in)	Southern Utah Thunderbirds	(United States)
PF	26	Kim Pierre-Louis	31 – 11 August 1993	1.83 m (6 ft 0 in)	BG Donau-Ries	(Germany)
SG	71	Clarita Antonio	26 – 1 July 1999	1.78 m (5 ft 10 in)	Surabaya Fever	(Indonesia)
C	99	Angelica Candra	20 – 5 July 2005	1.80 m (5 ft 11 in)	Mataram Yogyakarta	(Indonesia)

Head coach

- (Indonesia) Andrie Ekayana Santosa

Assistant coach(es)

- (Indonesia) Marlina Herawan

Legend

- (C) Team captain
- Club – describes last
  club before the tournament
- Age – describes age
  on 13 July 2025

=== New Zealand ===
The roster was announced on 23 June 2025.

New Zealand women's national basketball team roster
Players
Coaches

Pos.	No.	Name	Age – Date of birth	Height	Club	Ctr.
SF	2	Emilia Shearer	23 – 22 January 2002	1.78 m (5 ft 10 in)	Mackay Basketball	(Australia)
G	3	Bailey Flavell	18 – 15 February 2007	1.78 m (5 ft 10 in)	Hawaii Rainbow Wahine	(United States)
PG	4	Pahlyss Hokianga	17 – 9 October 2007	1.66 m (5 ft 5 in)	Tokomanawa Queens	(New Zealand)
F	8	Rebecca Pizzey	26 – 27 January 1999	1.91 m (6 ft 3 in)	Eltham Wildcats	(Australia)
SF	10	Ashlee Strawbridge	23 – 25 January 2002	1.78 m (5 ft 10 in)	West Adelaide Bearcats	(Australia)
F	13	Esra McGoldrick	25 – 24 October 1999	1.87 m (6 ft 2 in)	Casey Cavaliers	(Australia)
PF	14	Ella Tofaeono	27 – 11 March 1998	1.80 m (5 ft 11 in)	Melbourne Tigers	(Australia)
C	15	Ritorya Tamilo	20 – 15 June 2005	1.92 m (6 ft 4 in)	Hawaii Rainbow Wahine	(United States)
SG	22	Olivia Williams	22 – 26 January 2003	1.86 m (6 ft 1 in)	San Francisco Dons	(United States)
G	26	Tayla Dalton	23 – 1 October 2001	1.74 m (5 ft 9 in)	Townsville Fire	(Australia)
G	44	McKenna Dale	26 – 16 June 1999	1.81 m (5 ft 11 in)	Mandurah Magic	(Australia)
PF	45	Charlotte Whittaker	24 – 12 August 2000	1.90 m (6 ft 3 in)	Toulouse Métropole Basket	(France)

Head coach

- (Australia) Natalie Hurst

Assistant coach(es)

- (Australia) Kerryn Mitchell

Legend

- (C) Team captain
- Club – describes last
  club before the tournament
- Age – describes age
  on 13 July 2025

=== South Korea ===
South Korea women's national basketball team roster
Players
Coaches

Pos.	No.	Name	Age – Date of birth	Height	Club	Ctr.
PG	1	Shin Ji-hyun	29 – 12 September 1995	1.73 m (5 ft 8 in)	Incheon Shinhan	(South Korea)
PG	2	An He-ji	28 – 12 February 1997	1.64 m (5 ft 5 in)	Busan BNK Sum	(South Korea)
F	3	Kang Lee-seul (C)	31 – 5 April 1994	1.80 m (5 ft 11 in)	Cheongju KB Stars	(South Korea)
G	5	Heo Ye-eun	23 – 24 July 2001	1.67 m (5 ft 6 in)	Cheongju KB Stars	(South Korea)
PF	6	Choi Eun-sil	30 – 17 August 1994	1.83 m (6 ft 0 in)	Incheon Shinhan	(South Korea)
C	7	Park Ji-su	26 – 6 December 1998	1.98 m (6 ft 6 in)	Galatasaray S.K.	(Turkey)
G	8	Lee Ju-yeon	27 – 29 May 1998	1.71 m (5 ft 7 in)	Samsung Life Blueminx	(South Korea)
G	9	Park Ji-hyun	25 – 7 April 2000	1.85 m (6 ft 1 in)	Tokomanawa Queens	(New Zealand)
PG	10	Kang Yoo-lim	28 – 23 March 1997	1.75 m (5 ft 9 in)	Samsung Life Blueminx	(South Korea)
F	12	Lee Hae-ran	22 – 29 May 2003	1.80 m (5 ft 11 in)	Samsung Life Blueminx	(South Korea)
F	20	Lee Myung-kuwan	28 – 5 September 1996	1.73 m (5 ft 8 in)	Asan Woori Bank	(South Korea)
	39	Hong Yu-sun	20 – 23 February 2005	1.79 m (5 ft 10 in)	Incheon Shinhan	(South Korea)

Head coach

- (South Korea) Park Soo-ho

Assistant coach(es)

- (South Korea) Yang Ji-hee

Legend

- (C) Team captain
- Club – describes last
  club before the tournament
- Age – describes age
  on 13 July 2025

== Group B ==
=== Australia ===
The roster was announced on 7 July 2025.

Australia women's national basketball team roster
Players
Coaches

Pos.	No.	Name	Age – Date of birth	Height	Club	Ctr.
SG	1	Miela Goodchild	25 – 4 June 2000	1.75 m (5 ft 9 in)	Perth Lynx	(Australia)
SG	7	Courtney Woods	28 – 24 March 1997	1.83 m (6 ft 0 in)	Townsville Fire	(Australia)
SG	8	Abbey Ellis	24 – 22 January 2001	1.67 m (5 ft 6 in)	Townsville Fire	(Australia)
PG	12	Stephanie Reid	28 – 22 July 1996	1.65 m (5 ft 5 in)	Sopron Basket	(Hungary)
F	15	Cayla George (C)	36 – 1 May 1989	1.93 m (6 ft 4 in)	Sydney Flames	(Australia)
PF	19	Sara Blicavs	32 – 15 February 1993	1.88 m (6 ft 2 in)	Geelong Venom	(Australia)
G	20	Isobel Borlase	19 – 12 September 2004	1.80 m (5 ft 11 in)	Adelaide Lightning	(Australia)
PF	22	Zitina Aokuso	26 – 23 November 1998	1.90 m (6 ft 3 in)	Ormanspor	(Turkey)
F	23	Alexandra Fowler	23 – 21 July 2001	1.92 m (6 ft 4 in)	Townsville Fire	(Australia)
F	34	Isabelle Bourne	24 – 21 November 2000	1.88 m (6 ft 2 in)	Adelaide Lightning	(Australia)
SG	44	Alex Wilson	31 – 21 March 1994	1.74 m (5 ft 9 in)	Perth Lynx	(Australia)
PF	55	Chloe Bibby	27 – 15 June 1998	1.84 m (6 ft 0 in)	Uni Girona CB	(Spain)

Head coach

- (Australia) Paul Goriss

Assistant coach(es)

- (Australia) Cheryl Chambers

Legend

- (C) Team captain
- Club – describes last
  club before the tournament
- Age – describes age
  on 13 July 2025

=== Japan ===
The 12-player roster was announced on 7 July 2025.

Japan women's national basketball team roster
Players
Coaches

Pos.	No.	Name	Age – Date of birth	Height	Club	Ctr.
SG	2	Norika Konno	25 – 1 May 2000	1.79 m (5 ft 10 in)	Denso Iris	(Japan)
PF	3	Stephanie Mawuli	26 – 25 November 1998	1.82 m (6 ft 0 in)	Basket Zaragoza	(Spain)
SG	4	Mai Kawai	29 – 1 April 1996	1.71 m (5 ft 7 in)	Denso Iris	(Japan)
C	8	Maki Takada (C)	35 – 23 August 1989	1.85 m (6 ft 1 in)	Denso Iris	(Japan)
C	10	Ramu Tokashiki	34 – 11 June 1991	1.93 m (6 ft 4 in)	Aisin Wings	(Japan)
G	26	Kokoro Tanaka	19 – 10 January 2006	1.72 m (5 ft 8 in)	Eneos Sunflowers	(Japan)
SF	37	Minami Yabu	20 – 2 October 2004	1.78 m (5 ft 10 in)	Denso Iris	(Japan)
PF	52	Yuki Miyazawa	32 – 2 June 1993	1.83 m (6 ft 0 in)	Fujitsu Red Wave	(Japan)
SG	59	Anri Hoshi	25 – 9 May 2000	1.71 m (5 ft 7 in)	Eneos Sunflowers	(Japan)
SF	75	Nanako Todo	24 – 29 November 2000	1.75 m (5 ft 9 in)	Toyota Boshoku Sunshine Rabbits	(Japan)
C	77	Miwa Kuribayashi	26 – 26 August 1998	1.88 m (6 ft 2 in)	Tokyo Haneda Vickies	(Japan)
PF	99	Monica Okoye	26 – 7 February 1999	1.82 m (6 ft 0 in)	Eneos Sunflowers	(Japan)

Head coach

- (United States) Corey Gaines

Assistant coach(es)

- (Japan) Tomoki Miyata

Legend

- (C) Team captain
- Club – describes last
  club before the tournament
- Age – describes age
  on 13 July 2025

=== Lebanon ===
Lebanon women's national basketball team roster
Players
Coaches

Pos.	No.	Name	Age – Date of birth	Height	Club	Ctr.
C	0	Melody Saneh	23 – 11 October 2001	1.88 m (6 ft 2 in)	Azour Club	(Lebanon)
C	1	Zena Elias	25 – 5 February 2000	1.91 m (6 ft 3 in)	Beirut Club	(Lebanon)
G	3	Maygen Naassan	19 – 24 June 2006	1.83 m (6 ft 0 in)	Al Riyadi	(Lebanon)
PF	5	Maria Ghaleb	24 – 18 April 2001	1.80 m (5 ft 11 in)	Azour Club	(Lebanon)
PF	8	Daniella Fayad	28 – 9 April 1997	1.78 m (5 ft 10 in)	Homenetmen	(Lebanon)
PG	9	Nour Labban	19 – 4 October 2005	1.64 m (5 ft 5 in)	Al Riyadi	(Lebanon)
G	10	Tina Rita Raffoul	26 – 10 September 1998	1.80 m (5 ft 11 in)	Azour Club	(Lebanon)
PG	11	Rebecca Akl (C)	32 – 18 October 1992	1.70 m (5 ft 7 in)	Al Riyadi	(Lebanon)
C	14	Jillian Archer	24 – 16 August 2000	1.90 m (6 ft 3 in)	Homenetmen	(Lebanon)
G	19	Perla Bou Nasr	26 – 10 June 1999	1.77 m (5 ft 10 in)	Homenetmen	(Lebanon)
G	23	Mariam Jomaa	21 – 13 December 2003	1.65 m (5 ft 5 in)	Beirut Club	(Lebanon)
G	24	Amar Mansour	20 – 7 November 2004	1.75 m (5 ft 9 in)	Azour Club	(Lebanon)

Head coach

- (United States) Paul Coughter

Assistant coach(es)

- (Lebanon) Kaissar Lahoud

Legend

- (C) Team captain
- Club – describes last
  club before the tournament
- Age – describes age
  on 13 July 2025

=== Philippines ===
The roster was announced on 9 July 2025.

Philippines women's national basketball team roster
Players
Coaches

Pos.	No.	Name	Age – Date of birth	Height	Club	Ctr.
SG	0	Khate Castillo	28 – 5 October 1996	1.62 m (5 ft 4 in)	De La Salle University	(Philippines)
G	1	Sumayah Sugapong	19 – 1 December 2005	1.72 m (5 ft 8 in)
PG	2	Vanessa de Jesus	23 – 17 January 2002	1.73 m (5 ft 8 in)	Duke Blue Devils	(United States)
	4	Yvette Villanueva	24 – 18 April 2001
PG	5	Ella Fajardo	22 – 15 March 2003	1.65 m (5 ft 5 in)
SG	8	Angel Surada	24 – 5 May 2001	1.75 m (5 ft 9 in)	NU Lady Bulldogs	(Philippines)
SG	9	Louna Ozar	21 – 9 May 2004	1.72 m (5 ft 8 in)	UP Lady Maroons	(Philippines)
C	10	Jack Animam (C)	26 – 27 November 1998	1.95 m (6 ft 5 in)	BC ICIM Arad	(Romania)
C	19	Quinn Dela Rosa	21 – 1 March 2004	1.83 m (6 ft 0 in)	Ateneo Blue Eagles	(Philippines)
	22	Kent Pastrana	24 – 5 September 2000	1.70 m (5 ft 7 in)	UST Growling Tigresses	(Philippines)
PG	24	Naomi Panganiban	19 – 5 June 2006	1.70 m (5 ft 7 in)	San Diego State Aztecs	(United States)
PF	26	Cielo Pagdulagan	20 – 26 November 2004	1.70 m (5 ft 7 in)	NU Lady Bulldogs	(Philippines)

Head coach

- (Philippines) Patrick Aquino

Assistant coach(es)

- (Philippines) Julie Amos

Legend

- (C) Team captain
- Club – describes last
  club before the tournament
- Age describes age
  on 13 July 2025
