= 2022 FIBA Women's Basketball World Cup squads =

The following is the list of squads for each of the twelve teams competing in the 2022 FIBA Women's Basketball World Cup, to be held in Australia between 22 September and 1 October 2022. Each team selected a squad of 12 players for the tournament.

== Group A ==
=== Belgium ===
An eleven-player roster was announced on 4 September 2022, with the last spot being filled on 19 September.

Belgium women's national basketball team – 2022 FIBA Women's Basketball World Cup roster
Players
Coaches

Pos.	No.	Name	Age – Date of birth	Height	Club	Ctr.
PG	4	Elise Ramette	23 – 3 November 1998	1.77 m (5 ft 10 in)	Cadi La Seu	(Spain)
SF	6	Antonia Delaere	28 – 1 August 1994	1.82 m (6 ft 0 in)	Reyer Venezia	(Italy)
SF	10	Laure Résimont (C)	24 – 29 January 1998	1.85 m (6 ft 1 in)	Kangoeroes Basket Mechelen	(Belgium)
PF	11	Emma Meesseman	29 – 13 May 1993	1.93 m (6 ft 4 in)	Chicago Sky	(United States)
C	13	Kyara Linskens	25 – 13 November 1996	1.93 m (6 ft 4 in)	Lattes Montpellier	(France)
PG	19	Hind Ben Abdelkader	27 – 21 July 1995	1.69 m (5 ft 7 in)	ESB Villeneuve-d'Ascq	(France)
C	25	Becky Massey	22 – 21 March 2000	1.86 m (6 ft 1 in)	CB Estudiantes	(Spain)
SF	31	Maxuella Lisowa-Mbaka	21 – 14 May 2001	1.78 m (5 ft 10 in)	Elitzur Ramla	(Israel)
C	34	Billie Massey	22 – 21 March 2000	1.86 m (6 ft 1 in)	CB Estudiantes	(Spain)
PG	35	Julie Vanloo	29 – 10 February 1993	1.68 m (5 ft 6 in)	Lattes Montpellier	(France)
PG	55	Julie Allemand	26 – 7 July 1996	1.74 m (5 ft 9 in)	ASVEL Féminin	(France)
C	99	Ine Joris	21 – 25 July 2001	1.83 m (6 ft 0 in)	Kortrijk Spurs	(Belgium)

Head coach

- (France) Valéry Demory

Assistant coach(es)

- (Belgium) Pierre Cornia
- (France) Rachid Meziane

Legend

- (C) Team captain
- Club – describes last
  club before the tournament
- Age – describes age
  on 22 September 2022

=== Bosnia and Herzegovina ===
The roster was announced on 21 September 2022.

Bosnia and Herzegovina women's national basketball team – 2022 FIBA Women's Basketball World Cup roster
Players
Coaches

Pos.	No.	Name	Age – Date of birth	Height	Club	Ctr.
PG	4	Milica Deura (C)	32 – 22 July 1990	1.78 m (5 ft 10 in)	Slavia Banská Bystrica	(Bosnia and Herzegovina)
PG	5	Miljana Džombeta	28 – 5 July 1994	1.75 m (5 ft 9 in)	Constanța	(Romania)
G	7	Nikolina Knezević	27 – 16 February 1995	1.77 m (5 ft 10 in)	BK Brno	(Czech Republic)
G	9	Dragana Domuzin	21 – 3 November 2000	1.74 m (5 ft 9 in)	Slovanka MB	(Czech Republic)
SF	10	Ajla Iskanović	22 – 5 October 1999	1.86 m (6 ft 1 in)	ŽKK RMU Banovići	(Bosnia and Herzegovina)
SG	11	Nikolina Delić	25 – 1 November 1996	1.84 m (6 ft 0 in)	Akson Ilirija	(Slovenia)
C	13	Ajla Selimović	19 – 6 February 2003	1.83 m (6 ft 0 in)	Celta de Vigo Baloncesto	(Spain)
PF	15	Nikolina Elez	27 – 11 August 1995	1.86 m (6 ft 1 in)
C	23	Jovana Marković	25 – 10 January 1997	1.86 m (6 ft 1 in)	ŽKK Budućnost Podgorica	(Montenegro)
SG	24	Matea Tavić	30 – 29 May 1992	1.78 m (5 ft 10 in)	Rutronik Stars Keltern	(Germany)
SG	25	Anđela Delić	25 – 1 November 1996	1.81 m (5 ft 11 in)	Clarinos Tenerife	(Spain)
C	35	Jonquel Jones	28 – 5 January 1994	1.98 m (6 ft 6 in)	Connecticut Sun	(United States)

Head coach

- (Bosnia and Herzegovina) Goran Lojo

Assistant coach(es)

- (Bosnia and Herzegovina) Armin Šećerović

Legend

- (C) Team captain
- Club – describes last
  club before the tournament
- Age – describes age
  on 22 September 2022

=== China ===
China women's national basketball team – 2022 FIBA Women's Basketball World Cup roster
Players
Coaches

Pos.	No.	Name	Age – Date of birth	Height	Club	Ctr.
G	4	Li Yuan	22 – 29 May 2000	1.70 m (5 ft 7 in)	Shandong Six Stars	(China)
G	5	Wang Siyu	26 – 16 October 1995	1.80 m (5 ft 11 in)	Shandong Six Stars	(China)
G	6	Wu Tongtong	28 – 27 June 1994	1.75 m (5 ft 9 in)	Shanxi Flames	(China)
PG	7	Yang Liwei (C)	27 – 2 January 1995	1.76 m (5 ft 9 in)	Guangdong Vermilion Birds	(China)
G	8	Jin Weina	30 – 27 April 1992	1.80 m (5 ft 11 in)	Jiangsu Phoenix	(China)
SG	9	Li Meng	27 – 2 January 1995	1.83 m (6 ft 0 in)	Liaoning Flying Eagles	(China)
F	10	Zhang Ru	23 – 2 September 1999	1.85 m (6 ft 1 in)	Henan Phoenix	(China)
PF	11	Huang Sijing	26 – 8 January 1996	1.90 m (6 ft 3 in)	Guangdong Vermilion Birds	(China)
F	12	Pan Zhenqi	27 – 5 July 1995	1.90 m (6 ft 3 in)	Beijing Great Wall	(China)
C	13	Dilixiati Dilana	25 – 7 January 1997	1.94 m (6 ft 4 in)	Guangdong Vermilion Birds	(China)
C	14	Li Yueru	23 – 28 March 1999	2.01 m (6 ft 7 in)	Chicago Sky	(United States)
C	15	Han Xu	22 – 31 October 1999	2.05 m (6 ft 9 in)	New York Liberty	(United States)

Head coach

- (China) Zheng Wei

Assistant coach(es)

- (China) Nan Jia
- (Spain) César Rupérez

Legend

- (C) Team captain
- Club – describes last
  club before the tournament
- Age – describes age
  on 22 September 2022

=== Puerto Rico ===
The roster was announced on 21 September 2022.

Puerto Rico women's national basketball team – 2022 FIBA Women's Basketball World Cup roster
Players
Coaches

Pos.	No.	Name	Age – Date of birth	Height	Club	Ctr.
PG	0	Jennifer O'Neill	32 – 19 April 1990	1.65 m (5 ft 5 in)	Sampaio Basquete	(Brazil)
F	1	Tayra Meléndez	28 – 29 October 1993	1.70 m (5 ft 7 in)	Gigantes de Carolina	(Puerto Rico)
F	2	Brianna Jones	25 – 9 February 1997	1.78 m (5 ft 10 in)	BasCats USC Heidelberg	(Germany)
PG	5	Pamela Rosado (C)	36 – 30 April 1986	1.65 m (5 ft 5 in)	Titanes de Morovis	(Puerto Rico)
G	7	Zaida González	19 – 17 January 2003	1.75 m (5 ft 9 in)	FIU Panthers	(United States)
PF	11	Sofía Roma	25 – 21 November 1996	1.88 m (6 ft 2 in)	Södertälje BBK	(Sweden)
SF	13	Nairimar Vargas	22 – 24 March 2000	1.83 m (6 ft 0 in)	CIAPR	(Puerto Rico)
PF	21	Mya Hollingshed	22 – 29 October 1999	1.93 m (6 ft 4 in)	Soyuz Zarechny	(Russia)
SG	22	Arella Guirantes	24 – 15 October 1997	1.80 m (5 ft 11 in)	DVTK Hun-Therm	(Hungary)
PG	23	Trinity San Antonio	18 – 28 October 2003	1.74 m (5 ft 9 in)	California Baptist Lancers	(United States)
PF	25	Isalys Quiñones	24 – 23 October 1997	1.91 m (6 ft 3 in)	North Gold Coast Seahawks	(Australia)
C	33	India Pagán	23 – 7 January 1999	1.87 m (6 ft 2 in)	BC Marburg	(Germany)

Head coach

- (Puerto Rico) Jerry Batista

Assistant coach(es)

- (Puerto Rico) Samuel Arill
- (Puerto Rico) Carlos Morales

Legend

- (C) Team captain
- Club – describes last
  club before the tournament
- Age – describes age
  on 22 September 2022

=== South Korea ===
The roster was announced on 24 August 2022.

South Korea women's national basketball team – 2022 FIBA Women's Basketball World Cup roster
Players
Coaches

Pos.	No.	Name	Age – Date of birth	Height	Club	Ctr.
PG	1	Shin Ji-hyun	27 – 12 September 1995	1.73 m (5 ft 8 in)	Bucheon Hana 1Q	(South Korea)
G	2	Heo Ye-eun	21 – 24 July 2001	1.67 m (5 ft 6 in)	Cheongju KB Stars	(South Korea)
F	3	Kang Lee-seul	28 – 5 April 1994	1.80 m (5 ft 11 in)	Cheongju KB Stars	(South Korea)
G	4	Yoon Ye-bin	25 – 16 April 1997	1.80 m (5 ft 11 in)	Samsung Life Blueminx	(South Korea)
G	5	Park Ji-hyun	22 – 7 April 2000	1.85 m (6 ft 1 in)	Asan Woori Bank Wibee	(South Korea)
G	7	Park Hye-jin	32 – 22 July 1990	1.78 m (5 ft 10 in)	Asan Woori Bank Wibee	(South Korea)
C	10	Kim So-dam	29 – 4 January 1993	1.85 m (6 ft 1 in)	Cheongju KB Stars	(South Korea)
G	11	Lee So-hee	22 – 7 August 2000	1.71 m (5 ft 7 in)	Busan BNK Sum	(South Korea)
C	13	Yang In-young	27 – 13 March 1995	1.84 m (6 ft 0 in)	Bucheon Hana 1Q	(South Korea)
F	21	Kim Jin-young	26 – 20 July 1996	1.76 m (5 ft 9 in)	Incheon S-Birds	(South Korea)
F	23	Kim Dan-bi	32 – 27 February 1990	1.80 m (5 ft 11 in)	Incheon S-Birds	(South Korea)
C	27	Jin An	26 – 23 March 1996	1.82 m (6 ft 0 in)	Busan BNK Sum	(South Korea)

Head coach

- (South Korea) Jung Sun-min

Assistant coach(es)

- (South Korea) Choi Youn-ah

Legend

- (C) Team captain
- Club – describes last
  club before the tournament
- Age – describes age
  on 22 September 2022

=== United States ===
The roster was announced on 19 September 2022.

United States women's national basketball team - 2022 FIBA Women's Basketball World Cup roster
Players
Coaches

Pos.	No.	Name	Age – Date of birth	Height	Club
G	4	Jewell Loyd	28 – 5 October 1993	1.78 m (5 ft 10 in)	Seattle Storm	(United States)
G	5	Kelsey Plum	27 – 24 September 1994	1.73 m (5 ft 8 in)	Las Vegas Aces	(United States)
G	6	Sabrina Ionescu	24 – 6 December 1997	1.80 m (5 ft 11 in)	New York Liberty	(United States)
G	7	Ariel Atkins	26 – 30 July 1996	1.80 m (5 ft 11 in)	Washington Mystics	(United States)
G	8	Chelsea Gray	29 – 8 October 1992	1.80 m (5 ft 11 in)	Las Vegas Aces	(United States)
F	9	A'ja Wilson	26 – 8 August 1996	1.93 m (6 ft 4 in)	Las Vegas Aces	(United States)
PF	10	Breanna Stewart (C)	28 – 27 August 1994	1.91 m (6 ft 3 in)	Seattle Storm	(United States)
F	11	Kahleah Copper	28 – 28 August 1994	1.85 m (6 ft 1 in)	Chicago Sky	(United States)
PF	12	Alyssa Thomas	30 – 12 April 1992	1.88 m (6 ft 2 in)	Connecticut Sun	(United States)
C	13	Shakira Austin	22 – 25 July 2000	1.96 m (6 ft 5 in)	Washington Mystics	(United States)
G	14	Betnijah Laney	28 – 29 October 1993	1.83 m (6 ft 0 in)	New York Liberty	(United States)
C	15	Brionna Jones	26 – 18 December 1995	1.90 m (6 ft 3 in)	Connecticut Sun	(United States)

Head coach

- (United States) Cheryl Reeve

Assistant coach(es)

- (United States) Kara Lawson
- (United States) Mike Thibault
- (United States) Joni Taylor

Legend

- (C) Team captain
- Club – describes last
  club before the tournament
- Age – describes age
  on 22 September 2022

== Group B ==
=== Australia ===
The roster was announced on 10 August 2022.

Australia women's national basketball team – 2022 FIBA Women's Basketball World Cup roster
Players
Coaches

Pos.	No.	Name	Age – Date of birth	Height	Club	Ctr.
PG	3	Kristy Wallace	26 – 3 January 1996	1.80 m (5 ft 11 in)	Atlanta Dream	(United States)
PF	5	Darcee Garbin	28 – 24 June 1994	1.88 m (6 ft 2 in)	Frankston Blues	(Australia)
SF	6	Steph Talbot	28 – 15 June 1994	1.88 m (6 ft 2 in)	Seattle Storm	(United States)
G	7	Tess Madgen (C)	32 – 12 August 1990	1.80 m (5 ft 11 in)	Melbourne Boomers	(Australia)
SF	9	Bec Allen	29 – 6 November 1992	1.88 m (6 ft 2 in)	New York Liberty	(United States)
F	13	Ezi Magbegor	23 – 13 August 1999	1.93 m (6 ft 4 in)	Seattle Storm	(United States)
C	14	Marianna Tolo	33 – 2 July 1989	1.96 m (6 ft 5 in)	Spar Girona	(Spain)
F	15	Cayla George	33 – 1 May 1989	1.93 m (6 ft 4 in)	Melbourne Boomers	(Australia)
PF	19	Sara Blicavs	29 – 15 February 1993	1.88 m (6 ft 2 in)	Southside Flyers	(Australia)
SF	24	Anneli Maley	24 – 1 September 1998	1.84 m (6 ft 0 in)	Bendigo Spirit	(Australia)
C	25	Lauren Jackson	41 – 11 May 1981	1.95 m (6 ft 5 in)	Southside Flyers	(Australia)
G	32	Sami Whitcomb	34 – 20 July 1988	1.78 m (5 ft 10 in)	New York Liberty	(United States)

Head coach

- (Australia) Sandy Brondello

Assistant coach(es)

- (Australia) Cheryl Chambers
- (Germany) Olaf Lange

Legend

- (C) Team captain
- Club – describes last
  club before the tournament
- Age – describes age
  on 22 September 2022

=== Canada ===
The roster was announced on 19 September 2022.

Canada women's national basketball team – 2022 FIBA Women's Basketball World Cup roster
Players
Coaches

Pos.	No.	Name	Age – Date of birth	Height	Club	Ctr.
G	2	Aislinn Konig	24 – 20 May 1998	1.75 m (5 ft 9 in)	Flammes Carolo	(France)
G	4	Sami Hill	27 – 22 November 1994	1.78 m (5 ft 10 in)	Nördlingen	(Germany)
G	5	Kia Nurse	26 – 22 February 1996	1.82 m (6 ft 0 in)	Phoenix Mercury	(United States)
SF	6	Bridget Carleton	25 – 22 May 1997	1.85 m (6 ft 1 in)	Minnesota Lynx	(United States)
C	11	Natalie Achonwa (C)	29 – 22 November 1992	1.91 m (6 ft 3 in)	Minnesota Lynx	(United States)
G	13	Shay Colley	26 – 6 January 1996	1.76 m (5 ft 9 in)	Ramat HaSharon	(Israel)
C	14	Kayla Alexander	31 – 5 January 1991	1.93 m (6 ft 4 in)	ASVEL Féminin	(France)
F	15	Laeticia Amihere	21 – 20 July 2001	1.86 m (6 ft 1 in)	South Carolina Gamecocks	(United States)
F	16	Mael Gilles	25 – 13 July 1997	1.85 m (6 ft 1 in)	Phoenix Mercury	(United States)
G	21	Nirra Fields	28 – 3 December 1993	1.76 m (5 ft 9 in)	İzmit Belediyespor	(Turkey)
C	22	Phillipina Kyei	18 – 5 October 2003	2.01 m (6 ft 7 in)	Oregon Ducks	(United States)
SG	30	Taya Hanson	22 – 14 June 2000	1.78 m (5 ft 10 in)	Arizona State Sun Devils	(United States)

Head coach

- (Spain) Víctor Lapeña

Assistant coach(es)

- (Canada) Steve Baur
- (United States) Noelle Quinn

Legend

- (C) Team captain
- Club – describes last
  club before the tournament
- Age – describes age
  on 22 September 2022

=== France ===
The roster was announced on 18 September 2022.

France women's national basketball team - 2022 FIBA Women's Basketball World Cup squads roster
Players
Coaches

Pos.	No.	Name	Age – Date of birth	Height	Club
SG	1	Lisa Berkani	25 – 19 May 1997	1.76 m (5 ft 9 in)	Flammes Carolo	(France)
PG	4	Marine Fauthoux	21 – 23 January 2001	1.76 m (5 ft 9 in)	Basket Landes	(France)
PF	6	Alexia Chartereau	24 – 5 September 1998	1.90 m (6 ft 3 in)	ASVEL Féminin	(France)
SG	10	Sarah Michel (C)	33 – 10 January 1989	1.80 m (5 ft 11 in)	Bourges	(France)
C	12	Iliana Rupert	21 – 12 July 2001	1.94 m (6 ft 4 in)	Las Vegas Aces	(United States)
C	14	Ana Tadic	24 – 21 September 1998	1.98 m (6 ft 6 in)	Tarbes Gespe Bigorre	(France)
F	15	Gabby Williams	26 – 9 September 1996	1.80 m (5 ft 11 in)	Seattle Storm	(United States)
C	16	Héléna Ciak	32 – 15 December 1989	1.97 m (6 ft 6 in)	ASVEL Féminin	(France)
C	22	Marieme Badiane	27 – 24 November 1994	1.90 m (6 ft 3 in)	BLMA	(France)
SG	28	Mamignan Touré	27 – 19 December 1994	1.80 m (5 ft 11 in)	BLMA	(France)
PG	74	Marie-Eve Paget	27 – 28 November 1994	1.70 m (5 ft 7 in)	Basket Landes	(France)
SF	97	Kendra Chery	21 – 16 July 2001	1.85 m (6 ft 1 in)	Basket Landes	(France)

Head coach

- (France) Jean-Aimé Toupane

Assistant coach(es)

- (France) David Gauthier
- (France) Catherine Melain

Legend

- (C) Team captain
- Club – describes last
  club before the tournament
- Age – describes age
  on 22 September 2022

=== Japan ===
The roster was announced on 8 September 2022.

Japan women's national basketball team – 2022 FIBA Women's Basketball World Cup roster
Players
Coaches

Pos.	No.	Name	Age – Date of birth	Height	Club	Ctr.
PF	3	Stephanie Mawuli	23 – 25 November 1998	1.82 m (6 ft 0 in)	Toyota Antelopes	(Japan)
PG	5	Shiori Masuma	28 – 22 July 1994	1.61 m (5 ft 3 in)	Reyer Venezia	(Italy)
PF	8	Maki Takada (C)	33 – 23 August 1989	1.85 m (6 ft 1 in)	Denso Iris	(Japan)
C	10	Romu Tokashiki	31 – 11 June 1991	1.93 m (6 ft 4 in)	JX-Eneos Sunflowers	(Japan)
SG	14	Mai Yoshida	24 – 13 April 1998	1.75 m (5 ft 9 in)	Chanson V-Magic	(Japan)
PG	23	Mai Yamamoto	22 – 23 October 1999	1.63 m (5 ft 4 in)	Toyota Antelopes	(Japan)
SG	31	Aika Hirashita	20 – 14 January 2002	1.77 m (5 ft 10 in)	Toyota Antelopes	(Japan)
PG	32	Saori Miyazaki	27 – 27 August 1995	1.67 m (5 ft 6 in)	JX-Eneos Sunflowers	(Japan)
PF	52	Yuki Miyazawa	29 – 2 June 1993	1.83 m (6 ft 0 in)	Fujitsu Red Wave	(Japan)
SG	75	Nanako Todo	21 – 29 November 2000	1.75 m (5 ft 9 in)	Toyota Boshoku Sunshine Rabbits	(Japan)
SG	88	Himawari Akaho	24 – 28 August 1998	1.84 m (6 ft 0 in)	Denso Iris	(Japan)
PF	99	Monica Okoye	23 – 7 February 1999	1.82 m (6 ft 0 in)	Fujitsu Red Wave	(Japan)

Head coach

- (Japan) Toru Ontsuka

Assistant coach(es)

- (Japan) Yoshikazu Suzuki
- (Japan) Tsuneo Ueno

Legend

- (C) Team captain
- Club – describes last
  club before the tournament
- Age – describes age
  on 22 September 2022

=== Mali ===
Mali women's national basketball team – 2022 FIBA Women's Basketball World Cup roster roster
Players
Coaches

Pos.	No.	Name	Age – Date of birth	Height	Club	Ctr.
F	1	Kankou Coulibaly	32 – 11 April 1990	1.87 m (6 ft 2 in)	Charnay Basket Bourgogne Sud	(France)
F	2	Salimatou Kourouma	22 – 25 September 1999	1.79 m (5 ft 10 in)	Stade Malien	(Mali)
C	7	Aminata Traoré	22 – 18 May 2000	1.91 m (6 ft 3 in)	Melilla Sport Capital La Salle	(Spain)
PG	8	Touty Gandega	31 – 20 June 1991	1.75 m (5 ft 9 in)	AS Aulnoye-Aymeries	(France)
G	9	Djeneba Sangaré	22 – 7 October 1999	1.78 m (5 ft 10 in)	Basket Club Gransois	(France)
PF	10	Maimouna Haidara	18 – 2 June 2004	1.87 m (6 ft 2 in)	CDB Clarinos Tenerife	(Spain)
F	11	Kamite Elisabeth Dabou	17 – 9 November 2004	1.79 m (5 ft 10 in)	Centre Dorinthie Basket	(Mali)
G	12	Alima Dembélé (C)	22 – 20 January 2000	1.86 m (6 ft 1 in)	AS Commune III	(Mali)
F	13	Meiya Tirera	36 – 15 April 1986	1.86 m (6 ft 1 in)	AS Aulnoye-Aymeries	(France)
PF	14	Sika Koné	20 – 13 July 2002	1.90 m (6 ft 3 in)	Spar Gran Canaria	(Spain)
PG	50	Djeneba N'Diaye	25 – 8 July 1997	1.63 m (5 ft 4 in)	Club Polideportivo Bembibre	(Spain)
C	77	Diana Balayera	26 – 28 January 1996	1.91 m (6 ft 3 in)	Charnay Basket Bourgogne Sud	(France)

Head coach

- (Spain) Joaquin Brizuela

Assistant coach(es)

- (Mali) Aminata Sininta
- (Mali) Amara Traoré

Legend

- (C) Team captain
- Club – describes last
  club before the tournament
- Age – describes age
  on 22 September 2022

=== Serbia ===
The roster was announced on 21 September 2022.

Serbia women's national basketball team – 2022 FIBA Women's Basketball World Cup roster
Players
Coaches

Pos.	No.	Name	Age – Date of birth	Height	Club	Ctr.
PF	1	Ivana Raca	23 – 10 September 1999	1.88 m (6 ft 2 in)	IDK Euskotren	(Spain)
SG	6	Saša Čađo	33 – 13 July 1989	1.78 m (5 ft 10 in)	CCC Polkowice	(Poland)
SG	8	Nevena Jovanović	32 – 30 June 1990	1.79 m (5 ft 10 in)	Sopron Basket	(Hungary)
PG	12	Yvonne Anderson	32 – 8 March 1990	1.75 m (5 ft 9 in)	Bourges	(France)
C	14	Dragana Stanković	27 – 18 January 1995	1.95 m (6 ft 5 in)	Sopron Basket	(Hungary)
SF	17	Jovana Nogić	24 – 17 December 1997	1.81 m (5 ft 11 in)	CB Avenida	(Spain)
F	20	Kristina Topuzović	28 – 23 August 1994	1.83 m (6 ft 0 in)	Herner TC	(Germany)
PF	24	Maja Škorić	32 – 10 November 1989	1.84 m (6 ft 0 in)	Dinamo Lab	(Italy)
C	33	Tina Krajišnik (C)	31 – 12 January 1991	1.90 m (6 ft 3 in)	UMMC Ekaterinburg	(Russia)
PG	40	Ivana Katanić	23 – 16 April 1999	1.74 m (5 ft 9 in)	PEAC-Pécs	(Hungary)
SG	44	Katarina Zec	25 – 19 March 1997	1.78 m (5 ft 10 in)	Araski AES	(Spain)
PF	51	Mina Đorđević	23 – 23 February 1999	1.86 m (6 ft 1 in)	Fenerbahçe S.K.	(Turkey)

Head coach

- (Serbia) Marina Maljković

Assistant coach(es)

- (Serbia) Filip Bencić
- (Serbia) Ljubica Drljača

Legend

- (C) Team captain
- Club – describes last
  club before the tournament
- Age – describes age
  on 22 September 2022
