= 2024 Women's Basketball League Asia =

Inaugural edition of Women's Basketball League Asia

Tournament details
- Host country: China
- City: Chengdu
- Dates: 26–28 September
- Teams: 4
- Venue: 1

Final positions
- Champions: (China) Sichuan Yuanda Meile (1st title)
- Runners-up: (Chinese Taipei) Cathay Life Tigers
- Third place: (Japan) Fujitsu Red Wave
- Fourth place: (Indonesia) Surabaya Fever

Tournament statistics
- Games played: 6
- MVP: Han Xu (Sichuan Yuanda Meile)
- Top scorer: Han Xu (Sichuan Yuanda Meile) (17.7 ppg)
- Top rebounds: Yu Wen Hsiao (Cathay Life Tigers) (10.3 rpg)
- Top assists: Rui Machida (Fujitsu Red Wave) (8.0 apg)

Official website
- 2024 Basketball Champions League Asia

The 2024 Women's Basketball League Asia was the 1st edition of the new competition for Asian women's basketball club teams organised by FIBA Asia. The tournament was held at the Phoenix Hill Sports Park in Chengdu, China from 26 to 28 September.

Sichuan Yuanda Meile won the inaugural tournament after winning all their games to top the group.

The inaugural edition of the tournament was deemed a big success. Prior to the start of this event, many prestigious sponsors backed the competition.

== Introduction ==
First established by FIBA Asia in 2024, the competition is meant to expand women's club basketball in Asia. The FIBA Women's Basketball League Asia was officially green-lit during the first Asia Board meeting of the 2023–2027 cycle in Dubai.

== Format ==
4 teams competed in 1 group in a single round robin format. The group winner will be crowned as champion.

== Teams ==
The following teams qualified to the main tournament.

Team	Domestic league standings
(China) Sichuan Yuanda Meile	2024 Women's Chinese Basketball Association champions
(Japan) Fujitsu Red Wave	2023–24 Women's Japan Basketball League champions
(Chinese Taipei) Cathay Life Tigers	2024 Women's Super Basketball League champions
(Indonesia) Surabaya Fever	Invited

== Venue ==
On 6 September 2024, it was announced that the Phoenix Hill Sports Park in Chengdu, China would host the tournament. The arena has a capacity of 18,000.

Chengdu	2024 Women's Basketball League Asia is located in China
Phoenix Hill Sports Park	2024 Women's Basketball League Asia is located in China
Capacity: 18,000	2024 Women's Basketball League Asia is located in China

== Group stage ==
The schedule was announced in 7 September 2024.

Pos	Team	Pld	W	L	GF	GA	GD	Pts
1	(China) Sichuan Yuanda Meile (C)	3	3	0	242	179	+63	6
2	(Chinese Taipei) Cathay Life Tigers	3	2	1	210	217	−7	5
3	(Japan) Fujitsu Red Wave	3	1	2	254	195	+59	4
4	(Indonesia) Surabaya Fever	3	0	3	152	267	−115	3

Source: Report
Rules for classification: 1) Points; 2) Points difference; 3) Points scored.
(C) Champions

26 September 2024
16:00

Boxscore

Fujitsu Red Wave (Japan)	70–76	(Chinese Taipei) Cathay Life Tigers
Scoring by quarter: 27–26, 9–10, 19–19, 15–21
Pts: Hayashi 12; Rebs: Fujimoto, Miyazawa 5 Asts: Akagi 4		Pts: Huang 19; Rebs: Hsiao 13; Asts: Chen 6

Phoenix Hill Sports Park, Chengdu
Attendance: 10,000
Referees: Glenn Cornelio (PHI), Yana Nikogossyan (KAZ), Owe Shiong Chan (MAS)

26 September 2024
19:00

Boxscore

Sichuan Yuanda Meile (China)	83–45	(Indonesia) Surabaya Fever
Scoring by quarter: 22–11, 20–14, 24–9, 17–11
Pts: Tang 13; Rebs: Bishop 12; Asts: Li 3		Pts: Retong 8 Rebs: Little, Orville 7 Asts: Retong 4

Phoenix Hill Sports Park, Chengdu
Attendance: 10,000
Referees: Yevgeniy Mikheyev (KAZ), Bohui Kim (KOR), Preeda Muongmee (THA)

27 September 2024
16:00

Boxscore

Surabaya Fever (Indonesia)	45–115	(Japan) Fujitsu Red Wave
Scoring by quarter: 14–27, 10–34, 11–29, 10–25
Pts: Little 14; Rebs: Retong 6 Asts: Retong 2		Pts: Hayashi 18; Rebs: Fujimoto 13; Asts: Machida 13

Phoenix Hill Sports Park, Chengdu
Attendance: 10,000
Referees: Bohui Kim (KOR), Yevgeniy Mikheyev (KAZ), Owe Shiong Chan (MAS)

27 September 2024
19:00

Boxscore

Cathay Life Tigers (Chinese Taipei)	65–85	(China) Sichuan Yuanda Meile
Scoring by quarter: 17–17, 17–33, 15–20, 17–15
Pts: Cheng 12; Rebs: Hsiao 7 Asts: Chen 9		Pts: Wang 19; Rebs: Bishop 12; Asts: Jin 7

Phoenix Hill Sports Park, Chengdu
Attendance: 10,000
Referees: Yana Nikogossyan (KAZ), Kyounghwan Lee (KOR), Preeda Muongmee (THA)

28 September 2024
16:00

Boxscore

Cathay Life Tigers (Chinese Taipei)	69–62	(Indonesia) Surabaya Fever
Scoring by quarter: 16–18, 18–10, 19–11, 16–23
Pts: Hsiao 19; Rebs: Hsiao 11; Asts: Chen 8		Pts: Little, Orville 13; Rebs: Little 12; Asts: Retong 7

Phoenix Hill Sports Park, Chengdu
Attendance: 8,000
Referees: Kyounghwan Lee (KOR), Yana Nikogossyan (KAZ), Preeda Muongmee (THA)

28 September 2024
19:00

Boxscore

Sichuan Yuanda Meile (China)	74–69	(Japan) Fujitsu Red Wave
Scoring by quarter: 23–13, 19–17, 17–22, 15–17
Pts: Han 24; Rebs: Gao 10; Asts: three players 4		Pts: Uchio 17; Rebs: Hayashi, Temitope 8 Asts: Machida 8

Phoenix Hill Sports Park, Chengdu
Attendance: 8,000
Referees: Yevgeniy Mikheyev (KAZ), Bohui Kim (KOR), Glenn Cornelio (PHI)

2024 Women's Basketball League Asia winner

Sichuan Yuanda Meile
First title
