= Akari Sparks =

- Nickname: Sparks
- League: WMPBL
- History: Discovery Perlas (2025); Akari Sparks (2026–present)
- Location: Rizal, Philippines
- Team colors: Purple, Pink
- Main sponsor: Akari Lighting & Technology
- Head coach: Derrick Pumaren
- Championships: 1 (2026)

The Akari Sparks, also referred to as the Akari–Rizal Sparks, are a Philippine women's professional basketball team representing the province of Rizal and owned by Akari Lighting & Technology. The team competes in the Women's Maharlika Pilipinas Basketball League.

== History ==
=== Discovery Perlas era ===
The Akari Sparks first competed in the Women's Maharlika Pilipinas Basketball League (WMPBL) as Discovery Perlas during the 2025 Invitational Tournament and was mentored by head coach Helen Fedillaga. They finished as semifinalists.

Discovery Perlas remained in the WMPBL as one of the six teams selected for its inaugural professional season in the same year. Representing the province of Rizal, the team adopted the name Discovery-Rizal Perlas, while Derrick Pumaren took over as head coach.

Discovery Perlas reached the 2025 season finals, but New Zealand Bluefire–Batangas won the inaugural WMPBL title.

=== Akari Sparks era ===
The team changed their name to bear the name of Akari Lighting & Technology which was also responsible for backing the women's teams Akari Chargers and the Nxled Chameleons in the Premier Volleyball League. Now known as the Akari Sparks or Akari–Rizal, the Pumaren-coached team remains in the WMPBL for the 2026 season. Akari reached the finals again but defeated the defending champions New Zealand Bluefire in the finals and won their first ever WMPBL title.

Akari received an invite to take part at the 2026 Women's Basketball League Asia in Bengaluru, India. Representing the Philippines in the international women's club tournament, Akari finished fifth place defeating host Indian Railways in the playoff.
