= 2019 FIBA Women's Asia Cup =

28th Asian Women's Basketball Championship

Tournament details
- Host country: India
- Dates: 24–29 September
- Teams: 8 (from 46 federations)
- Venue: 1 (in 1 host city)

Final positions
- Champions: Japan (5th title)

Tournament statistics
- MVP: (Japan) Nako Motohashi
- Top scorer: (Japan) Motohashi (17.0)
- Top rebounds: (China) Li (9.6)
- Top assists: (Japan) Motohashi (5.0)
- PPG (Team): Australia (87.7)
- RPG (Team): China (50.2)
- APG (Team): Australia (28.5)

Official website
- 2019 FIBA Women's Asia Cup

The 2019 FIBA Women's Asia Cup was the first step for the qualification for FIBA Asia and FIBA Oceania for the women's basketball tournament at the 2020 Summer Olympics in Tokyo, Japan. The tournament was held from 24 to 29 September 2019 in Bangalore, India.

Japan won their fifth overall and fourth consecutive title after defeating China in the final.

== Venue ==
Bangalore	2019 FIBA Women's Asia Cup is located in India
Sree Kanteerava Indoor Stadium	2019 FIBA Women's Asia Cup is located in India
Capacity: 4,000	2019 FIBA Women's Asia Cup is located in India

== Qualified teams ==
- Host nation/Division B winner at the 2017 FIBA Women's Asia Cup:
  - India
- Division A Top 7 teams at the 2017 FIBA Women's Asia Cup:
  - Japan
  - Australia
  - China
  - South Korea
  - Chinese Taipei
  - New Zealand
  - Philippines

== Competition format ==
For Division A, during the Group phase, eight participating teams were divided into two groups of four teams each. Each team played all the other teams in its own group (a total of three games for each team).

The top teams in each group automatically qualified to the semi-finals, while the next two teams qualified to the quarter-finals, where the second placed team of one group played the third placed team of the other group for a spot in the semi-finals.

Meanwhile, the bottom teams in each group played the seventh place classification game. The eighth placed team of Division A was supposed to be relegated down to Division B of 2021 FIBA Women's Asia Cup, while the remaining teams in Division A advanced to play in the FIBA Pre-Qualifying Olympic Tournament alongside the Division B winner. However, the Division B was not held due to no country willing to host the tournament and India was given a berth in the Olympic pre-qualifiers. India also remained in Division A of the 2021 FIBA Women's Asia Cup.

== Squads ==
Each team consisted of 12 players which had to be confirmed by FIBA before 23 September.

== Preliminary round ==
All times are local (UTC+05:30)

=== Group A ===
Pos	Team	Pld	W	L	PF	PA	PD	Pts	Qualification
1	Japan	3	3	0	283	137	+146	6	Semifinals
2	South Korea	3	2	1	206	208	−2	5	Playoffs
3	Chinese Taipei	3	1	2	180	184	−4	4	Playoffs
4	India (H)	3	0	3	147	287	−140	3	Seventh place game

Source: FIBA
Rules for classification: 1) Points; 2) Head-to-head results; 3) Points difference; 4) Points scored.
(H) Hosts

24 September 2019
15:30

Boxscore

South Korea	48–44	Chinese Taipei
Scoring by quarter: 12–14, 10–10, 17–11, 9–9
Pts: Kim M. 10; Rebs: Park H. 9 Asts: three players 3		Pts: Cheng 10; Rebs: Cheng 8 Asts: Chu 4

Kanteerava Indoor Stadium, Bangalore

24 September 2019
20:00

Boxscore

Japan	103–27	India
Scoring by quarter: 28–7, 22–11, 31–6, 22–3
Pts: Akaho 23; Rebs: Nakada 11; Asts: Motohashi 5		Pts: Limaye 11; Rebs: Limaye 6 Asts: Geetha 3

Kanteerava Indoor Stadium, Bangalore

25 September 2019
15:30

Boxscore

Chinese Taipei	49–78	Japan
Scoring by quarter: 12–21, 21–6, 9–27, 7–24
Pts: Huang L. 12; Rebs: Tsai 4 Asts: Chu 4		Pts: Takada, Tokashiki 19; Rebs: Tokashiki 11; Asts: Machida 10

Kanteerava Indoor Stadium, Bangalore

25 September 2019
20:00

Boxscore

India	62–97	South Korea
Scoring by quarter: 22–20, 6–24, 15–30, 19–23
Pts: Skaria 14; Rebs: Udayakumar 6 Asts: Geetha, Limaye 3		Pts: Jin 21; Rebs: Bae 9 Asts: Bae 7

Kanteerava Indoor Stadium, Bangalore

26 September 2019
17:45

Boxscore

Japan	102–61	South Korea
Scoring by quarter: 24–5, 21–21, 30–16, 27–19
Pts: Motohashi 21; Rebs: Takada 8 Asts: Machida 7		Pts: Kang, Kim Y. 12; Rebs: Jin, Kang 6 Asts: Shin, Sim 4

Kanteerava Indoor Stadium, Bangalore

26 September 2019
20:00

Boxscore

Chinese Taipei	87–58	India
Scoring by quarter: 28–10, 13–14, 22–16, 24–18
Pts: Lin 15; Rebs: Tsai 7 Asts: Huang L., Lin 4		Pts: Limaye 13; Rebs: four players 6 Asts: Limaye 5

Kanteerava Indoor Stadium, Bangalore

=== Group B ===
Pos	Team	Pld	W	L	PF	PA	PD	Pts	Qualification
1	China	3	3	0	241	170	+71	6	Semifinals
2	Australia	3	2	1	274	171	+103	5	Playoffs
3	New Zealand	3	1	2	163	206	−43	4	Playoffs
4	Philippines	3	0	3	171	302	−131	3	Seventh place game

Source: FIBA
Rules for classification: 1) Points; 2) Head-to-head results; 3) Points difference; 4) Points scored.

24 September 2019
13:15

Boxscore

Australia	123–57	Philippines
Scoring by quarter: 38–16, 23–18, 25–6, 37–17
Pts: Magbegor 18; Rebs: George 14; Asts: Mitchell 9		Pts: Miranda 17; Rebs: Bernardino, Miranda 4 Asts: Daez, Miranda 2

Kanteerava Indoor Stadium, Bangalore

24 September 2019
17:45

Boxscore

China	67–44	New Zealand
Scoring by quarter: 8–8, 13–9, 21–12, 25–15
Pts: Li Yua., Shao 13; Rebs: Li Yue. 14; Asts: Shao 6		Pts: Cocks 10; Rebs: Purcell 6 Asts: Cocks 3

Kanteerava Indoor Stadium, Bangalore

25 September 2019
13:15

Boxscore

New Zealand	44–82	Australia
Scoring by quarter: 11–17, 14–26, 6–20, 13–19
Pts: Farnworth 12; Rebs: Davidson 6 Asts: Cocks 3		Pts: Magbegor 14; Rebs: George 9 Asts: Seekamp 6

Kanteerava Indoor Stadium, Bangalore

25 September 2019
17:45

Boxscore

Philippines	57–104	China
Scoring by quarter: 11–21, 15–26, 21–24, 10–33
Pts: Bernardino 10; Rebs: three players 5 Asts: Cabinbin 5		Pts: Chen 21; Rebs: Han 11; Asts: three players 6

Kanteerava Indoor Stadium, Bangalore

26 September 2019
13:15

Boxscore

New Zealand	75–57	Philippines
Scoring by quarter: 14–15, 25–17, 19–14, 17–11
Pts: Boagni 16; Rebs: Purcell 13; Asts: Purcell 5		Pts: Pontejos 15; Rebs: Pontejos 7 Asts: Cabinbin 5

Kanteerava Indoor Stadium, Bangalore

26 September 2019
15:30

Boxscore

Australia	69–70	China
Scoring by quarter: 20–19, 15–25, 16–12, 18–14
Pts: Ebzery 13; Rebs: three players 5 Asts: O'Hea 6		Pts: Wang 18; Rebs: Li Yue. 9 Asts: Wang 3

Kanteerava Indoor Stadium, Bangalore

== Knockout round ==
=== Bracket ===
Playoffs
27 September
Australia	90
Chinese Taipei	51
27 September
South Korea	58
New Zealand	52

Semifinals
28 September
Japan	76
Australia	64
28 September
China	80
South Korea	52

Finals
29 September
Japan	71
China	68
Third place
29 September
Australia	98
South Korea	62

=== Playoffs ===
27 September 2019
17:45

Boxscore

South Korea	58–52	New Zealand
Scoring by quarter: 20–14, 13–16, 17–9, 8–13
Pts: Bae, Kang 13; Rebs: Kang, Park H.6; Asts: Youm 7		Pts: Davidson 12; Rebs: three players 6 Asts: Purcell 4

Kanteerava Indoor Stadium, Bangalore

27 September 2019
20:00

Boxscore

Australia	90–51	Chinese Taipei
Scoring by quarter: 26–9, 26–14, 21–13, 17–15
Pts: Allen 15; Rebs: Seekamp 10; Asts: O'Hea, Seekamp 5		Pts: Chen, Huang L. 11; Rebs: Tsai 5 Asts: four players 2

Kanteerava Indoor Stadium, Bangalore

=== Semifinals ===
28 September 2019
17:45

Boxscore

Japan	76–64	Australia
Scoring by quarter: 15–23, 20–5, 17–20, 24–16
Pts: Motohashi 22; Rebs: Miyazawa 15; Asts: Motohashi 6		Pts: O'Hea 12; Rebs: Allen 8 Asts: three players 4

Kanteerava Indoor Stadium, Bangalore

28 September 2019
20:00

Boxscore

China	80–52	South Korea
Scoring by quarter: 25–18, 18–13, 20–2, 17–19
Pts: Han 17; Rebs: Gao 9 Asts: Shao 7		Pts: Bae 10; Rebs: three players 5 Asts: Bae 4

Kanteerava Indoor Stadium, Bangalore

=== Seventh place game ===
27 September 2019
15:30

Boxscore

India	78–92	Philippines
Scoring by quarter: 16–28, 22–13, 19–22, 21–29
Pts: Limaye 23; Rebs: Udayakumar 9 Asts: Limaye 6		Pts: Pontejos 18; Rebs: Animam 13; Asts: Tongco 8

Kanteerava Indoor Stadium, Bangalore

=== Fifth place game ===
28 September 2019
15:30

Boxscore

Chinese Taipei	56–71	New Zealand
Scoring by quarter: 14–15, 13–21, 16–22, 13–13
Pts: Huang P. 13; Rebs: Tsai 7 Asts: Chen, Huang L. 4		Pts: Cocks 18; Rebs: Purcell 11; Asts: Karaitiana 5

Kanteerava Indoor Stadium, Bangalore

=== Third place game ===
29 September 2019
15:30

Boxscore

Australia	98–62	South Korea
Scoring by quarter: 24–9, 24–10, 19–19, 31–24
Pts: Allen 20; Rebs: Allen, Magbegor 7 Asts: Talbot 8		Pts: Kim M., Park H. 13; Rebs: Park J. 7 Asts: Kim M., Shin 5

Kanteerava Indoor Stadium, Bangalore

=== Final ===
29 September 2019
17:45

Boxscore

Japan	71–68	China
Scoring by quarter: 17–19, 17–16, 20–16, 17–17
Pts: Motohashi 24; Rebs: Takada 9 Asts: Motohashi 8		Pts: Han 18; Rebs: Han, Li Yue. 7 Asts: Chen 5

Kanteerava Indoor Stadium, Bangalore

== Final standing ==
Qualified to the Asia/Oceania Pre-Qualifying Tournaments
Wildcard entry to the Asia/Oceania Pre-Qualifying Tournaments

Rank	Team	Record
1st place, gold medalist(s)	Japan	5–0
2nd place, silver medalist(s)	China	4–1
3rd place, bronze medalist(s)	Australia	4–2
4	South Korea	3–3
5	New Zealand	2–3
6	Chinese Taipei	1–4
7	Philippines	1–3
8	India	0–4

== Statistics and awards ==
=== Statistical leaders ===
Points

Name	PPG
(Japan) Nako Motohashi	17.0
(Japan) Yuki Miyazawa	12.8
(India) Shireen Limaye	12.3
(Australia) Eziyoda Magbegor	12.0
(Japan) Ramu Tokashiki	12.0

Rebounds

Name	RPG
(China) Li Yueru	9.6
(Japan) Yuki Miyazawa	9.0
(New Zealand) Kalani Purcell	7.6
(Japan) Maki Takada	7.6
(Japan) Ramu Tokashiki	7.6

Assists

Name	APG
(Japan) Nako Motohashi	5.0
(Japan) Rui Machida	4.6
(Philippines) France Cabinbin	4.0
(South Korea) Youm Yun-ah	4.0
(Australia) Stephanie Talbot	3.8
(China) Shao Ting	3.8

Blocks

Name	BPG
(China) Han Xu	2.6
(Australia) Eziyoda Magbegor	2.3
(Philippines) Afril Bernardino	2.0
(Japan) Ramu Tokashiki	1.8
(Japan) Himawari Akaho	1.6

Steals

Name	SPG
(Philippines) Afril Bernardino	2.5
(Chinese Taipei) Cheng I-hsiu	2.2
(China) Li Yueru	2.2
(New Zealand) Natalie Taylor	2.2
(Philippines) France Cabinbin	2.0

=== Awards ===
The all star-teams and MVP was announced on 29 September 2019.

All-Star Team
Guards	Forwards	Center
(Japan) Nako Motohashi (China) Shao Ting	(Japan) Yuki Miyazawa (Australia) Rebecca Allen	(China) Han Xu
MVP: (Japan) Nako Motohashi
