= Basketball at the 2018 Commonwealth Games – Women's team rosters =

This article shows the rosters of all participating teams at the women's basketball tournament at the 2018 Commonwealth Games on the Gold Coast.

== Group A ==
=== Australia ===
The following is the Australia roster in the women's basketball tournament of the 2018 Commonwealth Games.

Australia women's national basketball team – 2018 Commonwealth Games roster
Players
Coaches

Pos.	No.	Name	Age – Date of birth	Height	Club	Ctr.
G/F	4	Jenna O'Hea	30 – 6 June 1987	1.86 m (6 ft 1 in)	Melbourne Boomers	(Australia)
G	5	Tessa Lavey	25 – 29 March 1993	1.71 m (5 ft 7 in)	Dandenong Rangers	(Australia)
G	6	Stephanie Talbot	23 – 15 June 1994	1.88 m (6 ft 2 in)	Phoenix Mercury	(United States)
G	7	Stephanie Blicavs	27 – 26 July 1990	1.78 m (5 ft 10 in)	Dandenong Rangers	(Australia)
C	8	Liz Cambage	26 – 18 August 1991	2.03 m (6 ft 8 in)	Dallas Wings	(United States)
F	9	Kelsey Griffin	30 – 2 July 1987	1.88 m (6 ft 2 in)	Connecticut Sun	(United States)
G	10	Katie-Rae Ebzery	28 – 8 January 1990	1.78 m (5 ft 10 in)	Sydney Uni Flames	(Australia)
G/F	12	Belinda Snell (C)	37 – 10 January 1981	1.80 m (5 ft 11 in)	Sydney Uni Flames	(Australia)
F	13	Eziyoda Magbegor	18 – 13 August 1999	1.93 m (6 ft 4 in)	Melbourne Boomers	(Australia)
F/C	15	Cayla George	28 – 1 May 1989	1.94 m (6 ft 4 in)	Connecticut Sun	(United States)
G/F	21	Alice Kunek	27 – 6 January 1991	1.85 m (6 ft 1 in)	Perth Lynx	(Australia)
G	35	Nicole Seekamp	25 – 26 April 1992	1.78 m (5 ft 10 in)	Adelaide Lightning	(Australia)

Head coach

- (Australia) Sandy Brondello

Assistant coach(es)

- (Australia) Cheryl Chambers
- (Australia) Paul Goriss

Legend

- (C) Team captain
- Club – describes last
  club before the tournament
- Age – describes age
  on 5 April 2018

=== Canada ===
The following is the Canada roster in the women's basketball tournament of the 2018 Commonwealth Games.

Canada women's national basketball team - 2018 Commonwealth Games roster
Players
Coaches

Pos.	No.	Name	Age – Date of birth	Height	Club	Ctr.
G	4	Danielle Boiago	24 – 4 April 1994	1.74 m (5 ft 9 in)	Royal Eagles	(Netherlands)
G	5	Ceejay Nofuente	24 – 24 October 1993	1.77 m (5 ft 10 in)	Humber Hawks	(Canada)
G	6	Daneesha Provo	21 – 14 May 1996	1.82 m (6 ft 0 in)	Utah Utes	(United States)
G	7	Merissah Russell	16 – 3 March 2002	1.83 m (6 ft 0 in)	Capital Courts Academy	(Canada)
G	8	Shay Colley	22 – 6 January 1996	1.75 m (5 ft 9 in)	Michigan State Spartans	(United States)
F	9	Niyah Becker	17 – 14 October 2000	1.87 m (6 ft 2 in)	Lincoln Prep	(Canada)
F	10	Catherine Traer	23 – 30 September 1994	1.81 m (5 ft 11 in)	Carleton Ravens	(Canada)
G/F	11	Jacey Bailey	19 – 20 September 1998	1.83 m (6 ft 0 in)	Northern Arizona Lumberjacks	(United States)
F/C	12	Summer Masikewich	19 – 23 July 1998	1.86 m (6 ft 1 in)	Saskatchewan Huskies	(Canada)
F	13	Paige Crozon	23 – 5 July 1994	1.85 m (6 ft 1 in)	Saarlouis Royals	(Germany)
F/C	14	Alex Kiss-Rusk	24 – 27 December 1993	1.92 m (6 ft 4 in)	McGill Martlets	(Canada)
C	15	Ruth Hamblin (C)	23 – 24 June 1994	2.01 m (6 ft 7 in)	Bourges Basket	(France)

Head coach

- (Canada) Steve Baur

Assistant coach(es)

- (Canada) Joseph McKenzie

Legend

- (C) Team captain
- Club - describes last
  club before the tournament
- Age - describes age
  on 5 April 2018

=== England ===
The following is the England roster in the women's basketball tournament of the 2018 Commonwealth Games.

England women's national basketball team - 2018 Commonwealth Games roster
Players
Coaches

Pos.	No.	Name	Age – Date of birth	Height	Club	Ctr.
G	1	Melita Emanuel-Carr	23 – 6 November 1994	1.78 m (5 ft 10 in)	CABC Basket	(France)
G	3	Nicolette Fong Lyew Quee	25 – 14 April 1992	1.65 m (5 ft 5 in)	Durham Palatinates	(England)
G	4	Siobhan Prior	31 – 27 February 1987	1.78 m (5 ft 10 in)	Nottingham Wildcats	(England)
G	6	Stefanie Collins	35 – 30 December 1982	1.68 m (5 ft 6 in)	Cardiff Archers	(Wales)
G	7	Rachael Vanderwal	34 – 27 June 1983	1.75 m (5 ft 9 in)	Universitario de Ferrol	(Spain)
G	8	Georgia Jones	28 – 3 April 1990	1.72 m (5 ft 8 in)	Manchester Mystics	(England)
C	9	Hannah Shaw	27 – 22 September 1990	1.93 m (6 ft 4 in)	Northumbria	(England)
G	10	Eilidh Simpson	25 – 11 September 1992	1.70 m (5 ft 7 in)	Cardiff Archers	(Wales)
F	11	Mollie Campbell	23 – 28 February 1995	1.83 m (6 ft 0 in)	Leicester Riders	(England)
F	12	Chantelle Pressley	27 – 25 May 1990	1.85 m (6 ft 1 in)	Sevenoaks Suns	(England)
C	13	Azania Stewart (C)	29 – 13 March 1989	1.96 m (6 ft 5 in)	TTT Riga	(Latvia)
F/C	20	Dominique Allen	28 – 10 September 1989	1.92 m (6 ft 4 in)	Manchester Mystics	(England)

Head coach

- (Spain) Jose Buceta

Assistant coach(es)

- (England) Chris Bunten
- (England) Vanessa Ellis

Legend

- (C) Team captain
- Club - describes last
  club before the tournament
- Age - describes age
  on 5 April 2018

=== Mozambique ===
The following is the Mozambique roster in the women's basketball tournament of the 2018 Commonwealth Games.

Mozambique women's national basketball team - 2018 Commonwealth Games roster
Players
Coaches

Pos.	No.	Name	Age – Date of birth	Height	Club	Ctr.
G	4	Iliana Ventura	28 – 14 February 1990	1.68 m (5 ft 6 in)	A'Politechnica	(Mozambique)
F	5	Ingvild Mucauro	25 – 12 September 1992	1.78 m (5 ft 10 in)	Ferroviário	(Mozambique)
G	6	Dulce Mabjaia	29 – 5 November 1988	1.65 m (5 ft 5 in)	Ferroviário	(Mozambique)
G	7	Anabela Cossa	31 – 7 April 1986	1.72 m (5 ft 8 in)	Ferroviário	(Mozambique)
F	8	Eliotéria Lhavanguane	20 – 12 November 1997	1.81 m (5 ft 11 in)	Ferroviário	(Mozambique)
G	9	Ana Jaime	27 – 6 December 1990	1.69 m (5 ft 7 in)	Ferroviário	(Mozambique)
G	10	Delma Zita	20 – 27 March 1998	1.63 m (5 ft 4 in)	Ferroviário	(Mozambique)
G	11	Aquila Mucubarique	22 – 20 November 1995	1.71 m (5 ft 7 in)
G	12	Elizabeth Pereira	26 – 8 November 1991	1.70 m (5 ft 7 in)	Ferroviário	(Mozambique)
G	13	Onélia Mutombene	27 – 24 October 1990	1.66 m (5 ft 5 in)	Campus Promete	(Spain)
F	14	Odélia Mafanela	28 – 14 April 1989	1.84 m (6 ft 0 in)	Ferroviário	(Mozambique)
F/C	15	Deolinda Gimo	30 – 15 August 1987	1.90 m (6 ft 3 in)	Ferroviário	(Mozambique)

Head coach

- (Mozambique) Deolinda Ngulela

Assistant coach(es)

- (Mozambique) Leonel Manhique

Legend

- (C) Team captain
- Club - describes last
  club before the tournament
- Age - describes age
  on 5 April 2018

== Group B ==
=== India ===
The following is the India roster in the women's basketball tournament of the 2018 Commonwealth Games.

India women's national basketball team - 2018 Commonwealth Games roster
Players
Coaches

Pos.	No.	Name	Age – Date of birth	Height	Club	Ctr.
F	4	Anjana Prasannan Geetha	23 – 9 November 1994	1.77 m (5 ft 10 in)	Kerala	(India)
G	5	Barkha Sonkar	21 – 24 December 1996	1.56 m (5 ft 1 in)	Uttar Pradesh	(India)
F	6	Raspreet Sidhu	28 – 18 July 1989	1.69 m (5 ft 7 in)	Delhi	(India)
G/F	8	Grima Merlin Varghese	23 – 29 March 1995	1.74 m (5 ft 9 in)	Kerala	(India)
C	9	Anmolpreet Kaur	18 – 24 November 1999	1.85 m (6 ft 1 in)	Punjab	(India)
F	10	Navaneetha Pattemane Udayakumar	23 – 28 July 1994	1.78 m (5 ft 10 in)	Railways	(India)
F	12	Rajapriyadharshini Rajaganapathi	24 – 3 January 1994	1.78 m (5 ft 10 in)	Railways	(India)
F	13	Jeena Palanilkumkalayil Skaria	24 – 9 January 1994	1.78 m (5 ft 10 in)	Kerala	(India)
C	14	Shireen Limaye	23 – 13 February 1995	1.87 m (6 ft 2 in)	Maharashtra	(India)
G	15	Sruthi Menon	22 – 21 February 1996	1.70 m (5 ft 7 in)	Railways	(India)
G	18	Bhandavya Hemmige Mahesha	19 – 18 April 1998	1.63 m (5 ft 4 in)	Karnataka	(India)
G	19	Madhu Kumari	22 – 9 July 1995	1.65 m (5 ft 5 in)	Railways	(India)

Head coach

- (Serbia) Zoran Višić

Assistant coach(es)

- (India) Shiba Maggon

Legend

- (C) Team captain
- Club - describes last
  club before the tournament
- Age - describes age
  on 5 April 2018

=== Jamaica ===
The following is the Jamaica roster in the women's basketball tournament of the 2018 Commonwealth Games.

Jamaica women's national basketball team - 2018 Commonwealth Games roster
Players
Coaches

Pos.	No.	Name	Age – Date of birth	Height	Club	Ctr.
G	4	Tarita Gordon	29 – 20 March 1989	1.65 m (5 ft 5 in)
G/F	5	Ashalee Gordon	20 – 5 June 1997	1.77 m (5 ft 10 in)		(Jamaica)
G	7	Loreta Gordon	24 – 11 January 1994	1.68 m (5 ft 6 in)	Unique Ballers	(Jamaica)
G	8	Sasha Dixon	30 – 10 June 1987	1.65 m (5 ft 5 in)	Homestead Cougars	(Jamaica)
F/C	9	Althea Byfield	35 – 28 November 1982	1.85 m (6 ft 1 in)	Homestead Cougars	(Jamaica)
F	10	Shenneika Smith	28 – 9 December 1989	1.87 m (6 ft 2 in)	Southern Lady Generals	(United States)
F	11	Angelee Latouche	33 – 16 February 1985	1.87 m (6 ft 2 in)	Walgrovians	(Jamaica)
G/F	12	Simone Jackson	33 – 12 April 1984	1.75 m (5 ft 9 in)	Braves Smilers	(Jamaica)
F	13	Cadene Cowan	25 – 17 March 1993
F	15	Jennifer George	27 – 22 February 1991	1.85 m (6 ft 1 in)	Montaneras de Morovis	(Puerto Rico)

Head coach

- (Jamaica) Rohan Robinson

Assistant coach(es)

- (Jamaica) Oneil Brown
- (Jamaica) Joyce Graham-Royal

Legend

- (C) Team captain
- Club - describes last
  club before the tournament
- Age - describes age
  on 5 April 2018

=== Malaysia ===
The following is the Malaysia roster in the women's basketball tournament of the 2018 Commonwealth Games.

Malaysia women's national basketball team - 2018 Commonwealth Games roster
Players
Coaches

Pos.	No.	Name	Age – Date of birth	Height	Club	Ctr.
F	1	Hui Pin Pang	27 – 29 April 1990	1.76 m (5 ft 9 in)	Segamat BA	(Malaysia)
G	5	Yin Yin Chong	24 – 26 June 1993	1.66 m (5 ft 5 in)	Megainn Selangor	(Malaysia)
G	6	Wei Yin Saw	26 – 2 March 1992	1.66 m (5 ft 5 in)	Megainn Selangor	(Malaysia)
G	7	Nur Izzati Yaakob	28 – 16 November 1989	1.63 m (5 ft 4 in)	KL Binapuri	(Malaysia)
F	8	Poh Yee Ooi	25 – 12 March 1993	1.75 m (5 ft 9 in)	Megainn Selangor	(Malaysia)
F	10	Chia Qian Tai	21 – 15 June 1996	1.70 m (5 ft 7 in)	Melaka 906 Warrior	(Malaysia)
G	11	Phey Chyi Low	24 – 29 March 1994	1.68 m (5 ft 6 in)	Segamat BA	(Malaysia)
C	12	Kalaimathi Rajintiran	27 – 2 September 1990	1.85 m (6 ft 1 in)	Segamat BA	(Malaysia)
F	20	Yu Feng Ng	20 – 7 June 1997	1.68 m (5 ft 6 in)	Segamat BA	(Malaysia)
C	22	Ky Lie Hiew	20 – 22 March 1998	1.78 m (5 ft 10 in)	Megainn Selangor	(Malaysia)
F	35	Fook Yee Yap	24 – 15 June 1993	1.74 m (5 ft 9 in)	KL Binapuri	(Malaysia)
C	72	Chiau Teng Ting	26 – 10 March 1992	1.80 m (5 ft 11 in)	KL Binapuri	(Malaysia)

Head coach

- (Malaysia) Sze Yuin Yoong

Assistant coach(es)

- (Malaysia) Weng Honn Kan
- (Malaysia) Choo Seck Yun

Legend

- (C) Team captain
- Club - describes last
  club before the tournament
- Age - describes age
  on 5 April 2018

=== New Zealand ===
The following is the New Zealand roster in the women's basketball tournament of the 2018 Commonwealth Games.

New Zealand women's national basketball team - 2018 Commonwealth Games roster
Players
Coaches

Pos.	No.	Name	Age – Date of birth	Height	Club	Ctr.
G	0	Zara Jillings	19 – 30 May 1998	1.75 m (5 ft 9 in)	Fordham Rams	(United States)
G	1	Erin Rooney	27 – 3 September 1990	1.73 m (5 ft 8 in)	BBC Troistorrents	(Switzerland)
G	2	Micaela Cocks	31 – 2 May 1986	1.74 m (5 ft 9 in)	Townsville Fire	(Australia)
F	4	Kalani Purcell	23 – 13 January 1995	1.84 m (6 ft 0 in)	Melbourne Boomers	(Australia)
G	6	Jordan Hunter	27 – 20 August 1990	1.68 m (5 ft 6 in)	Sturt Sabres	(Australia)
G	7	Antonia Farnworth	30 – 10 May 1987	1.81 m (5 ft 11 in)	Perth Lynx	(Australia)
F	8	Natalie Taylor	35 – 24 December 1982	1.83 m (6 ft 0 in)	Brisbane Spartans	(Australia)
G/F	10	Chevannah Paalvast	26 – 4 September 1991	1.80 m (5 ft 11 in)	Canberra Capitals	(Australia)
F	11	Jessica Bygate	26 – 10 January 1992	1.85 m (6 ft 1 in)	Sandringham Sabres	(Australia)
C	13	Josephine Stockill	24 – 29 December 1993	1.86 m (6 ft 1 in)	Sunbury Jets	(Australia)
F	15	Deena Franklin	23 – 5 February 1995	1.86 m (6 ft 1 in)	Harbour Breeze	(New Zealand)
G	55	Charlisse Leger-Walker	16 – 15 September 2001	1.74 m (5 ft 9 in)	Waikato Wizards	(New Zealand)

Head coach

- (Australia) Guy Molloy

Assistant coach(es)

- (New Zealand) Jody Cameron
- (New Zealand) Aik Ho

Legend

- (C) Team captain
- Club - describes last
  club before the tournament
- Age - describes age
  on 5 April 2018

== See also ==
- Basketball at the 2018 Commonwealth Games – Men's team rosters
