= Women's Basketball League Asia =

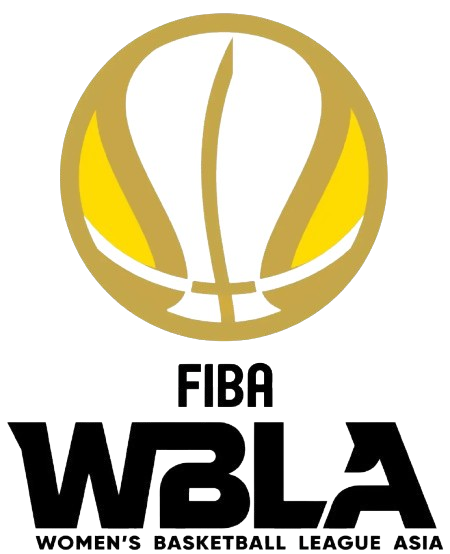
- Organising body: FIBA Asia
- First season: 2024
- Region: Asia
- Number of teams: 6
- Current champions: (Japan) Denso Iris (1st title)
- Most championships: three teams (1 title each)
- Website: www.fiba.basketball/wblasia/

The Women's Basketball League Asia (also known as WBLA) is the top annual women's basketball competition for clubs from FIBA Asia members.

== History ==
The FIBA Asia Board held its first meeting for the 2023–2027 cycle at the Dubai Sports Council Headquarters in Dubai, United Arab Emirates on 7 November 2023. At the gathering, officials approved the conduct of an annual women's basketball tournament for clubs in Asia—the Women's Basketball League Asia (WBLA).

The first two editions were held in China; 2024 in Chengdu and 2025 in Dongguan. Teams from the host country won both editions namely Sichuan Yuanda Meile (2024) and Guangdong Vermilion Birds (2025).

In 2026, the tournament was held outside China for the very first time. The WBLA was hosted in Bengaluru in India. Japanese team, Denso Iris ended the two-title streak by Chinese teams by defeating Sichuan in the final.

== Results ==
| Ed. | Year | Host | Final | | | Third place game | | | No. of teams |
| Ed. | Year | Host | Champion | Score | Runner-up | Third | Score | Fourth | No. of teams |
| 1 | 2024 | (China); Chengdu | (China); Sichuan Yuanda Meile | RR | (Chinese Taipei); Cathay Life Tigers | (Japan); Fujitsu Red Wave | RR | (Indonesia); Surabaya Fever | 4 |
| 2 | 2025 | (China); Dongguan | (China); Guangdong Vermilion Birds | 95–67 | (Japan); Fujitsu Red Wave | (South Korea); Busan BNK Sum | 79–74 | (Mongolia); Ulaanbaatar Amazons | 6 |
| 3 | 2026 | (India); Bengaluru | (Japan); Denso Iris | 81–63 | (China); Sichuan Yuanda Meile | (Chinese Taipei); Cathay Life Tigers | 73–68 | (South Korea); Cheongju KB Stars | 6 |

== Statistics ==
=== Titles by club ===
| Rank | Club | Winners | Runners-up |
|---|---|---|---|
| 1 | (China) Sichuan Yuanda Meile | 1 | 1 |
| 2 | (China) Guangdong Vermilion Birds | 1 | 0 |
| 2 | (Japan) Denso Iris | 1 | 0 |
| 3 | (Chinese Taipei) Cathay Life Tigers | 0 | 1 |
| 3 | (Japan) Fujitsu Red Wave | 0 | 1 |

=== Medals by country ===
| Rank | Nation | Gold | Silver | Bronze | Total |
|---|---|---|---|---|---|
| 1 | China (CHN) | 2 | 1 | 0 | 3 |
| 2 | Japan (JPN) | 1 | 1 | 1 | 3 |
| 3 | Chinese Taipei (TPE) | 0 | 1 | 1 | 2 |
| 4 | South Korea (KOR) | 0 | 0 | 1 | 1 |
| Totals (4 entries) | | 3 | 3 | 3 | 9 |

== See also ==
- Basketball Champions League Asia
- East Asia Super League
- West Asia Super League
