= Penina Davidson =

New Zealand basketball player (born 1995)

No. 12 – MGS Panserraikos Serres
- Position: Forward
- League: Greek Women's Basketball League

Personal information
- Born: 2 September 1995 (age 31) Auckland, New Zealand
- Listed height: 6 ft 3 in (1.91 m)

Career information
- High school: Rangitoto College (Auckland, New Zealand)
- College: California (2014–2018)
- WNBA draft: 2018: undrafted
- Playing career: 2018–present

Career history
- 2018–2019: North Harbour Breeze
- 2018–2019: Adelaide Lightning
- 2019–2024: Melbourne Boomers
- 2021: Nunawading Spectres
- 2022–2023: Cairns Dolphins
- 2023–2024: BNZ Northern Kāhu
- 2024: Keilor Thunder
- 2025: Cathay Life Tigers
- 2025: Tokomanawa Queens
- 2026: MGS Panserraikos Serres

Career highlights
- 2025 Taiwan WBSL Champions; 2025 Tauihi Basketball Aotearoa All Star Five; 2023 FIBA Asia Cup All-Star Five selection; 2023 Tauihi Basketball Aotearoa Champions; 2021 BBNZ Female Player of the Year; 2019 WNBL Champions; 2019 BBNZ Female Player of the Year
Medals
Women's basketball
Representing New Zealand
FIBA Oceania Championship
Silver medal – second place	2013 Australia / New Zealand	Team
Silver medal – second place	2015 Australia / New Zealand	Team

Penina Jasmine Davidson (born 2 September 1995) is a New Zealand professional basketball player.

== College ==
Davidson played college basketball at the University of California, Berkeley, playing with the Golden Bears in the Pac-12 Conference of NCAA Division I.

=== Statistics ===
Year	Team	GP	GS	MPG	FG%	3P%	FT%	RPG	APG	SPG	BPG	TO	PPG
2014–15	California	34	0	11.8	.455	.400	.500	1.4	0.3	0.2	0.1	0.8	3.3
2015–16	California	32	8	22.8	.475	.219	.467	4.0	0.8	0.4	0.8	1.5	5.7
2016–17	California	33	25	22.8	.476	.286	.596	5.3	1.0	0.6	0.9	1.6	6.5
2017–18	California	32	32	24.8	.480	.250	.661	7.0	0.7	0.3	0.7	1.5	7.4
Career		131	65	20.4	.474	.286	.574	4.4	0.7	0.4	0.6	1.3	5.7

== Career ==
=== WNBL ===
In 2018, Davidson would make her professional debut after she was signed by the Adelaide Lightning for the 2018–19 WNBL season. There she was under head coach Chris Lucas, and played alongside the likes of Nia Coffey, Stephanie Blicavs and Lauren Nicholson, making a Finals appearance in her debut season.

In 2019, Davidson signed with the Melbourne Boomers for the 2019–20 season. In signing with the Boomers, Davidson joined several of her Tall Ferns teammates all playing under national team head coach, Guy Molloy.

In July 2020, Davidson signed to return to the Boomers for the 2020 hub season based in North Queensland.

=== TBA ===
In 2023, Davidson helped the Northern Kāhu win the Tauihi Basketball Aotearoa championship.

In 2025, Davidson helped the Tokomanawa Queens finish the regular Tauihi Basketball Aotearoa season at the top of the table. Davidson finished the season well statistically, including holding the league's top average for total RPG (10.2), in the top five for average PPG (15.9), and league leader for second chance points (68). Davidson was also selected as one of the league's All Star Five

=== WSBL ===
On 10 January 2025, Davidson signed with the Cathay Life Tigers of the Women's Super Basketball League (WSBL).

=== Greek Women's Basketball League ===
In December 2025, Davidson signed with MGS Panserraikos Serres of the Greek Women's Basketball League, aka A1 Ethniki (A1 National) Women's Basketball.

== National team ==
=== Youth level ===
Davidson made her international debut for the New Zealand under-17 team at the 2009 FIBA Oceania Under-16 Championship in Brisbane, Queensland, at just the age of 14. She would take home the Silver medal at the Under-16's in both 2009 and 2011. In 2012, Davidson represented NZ at the FIBA Oceania Under-18 Championship in Porirua, New Zealand.

=== Senior level ===
Davidson made her senior international debut with the Tall Ferns at the 2013 FIBA Oceania Championship. She has taken home the silver medal on two occasions. Purcell played for the Tall Ferns at the 2016 FIBA World Olympic Qualifying Tournament in Nantes, France. After losses to France and Cuba, New Zealand failed to qualify. Davidson also represented the Tall Ferns at the 2019 FIBA Asia Cup in Bangalore, India, where New Zealand placed fifth overall.

Penina also led the Tall Ferns at the 2023 FIBA Women's Asia Cup in Sydney, Australia, where she averaged 13.6 points and 9.8 rebounds per game. The Tall Ferns placed fourth and booked a spot in the 2024 Olympic Qualifying Tournament. Davidson was named to the All Star 5 at this tournament.

== Personal life ==
Davidson has been open about her battles with bipolar disorder, and its affects on her playing, including periods of self-harming. She was hospitalized and after her diagnosis she has said that life became much easier.

Davidson is of Samoan descent. Her brother, Isaac, is also a professional basketball player.
