= Vladimir Vuksanović =

Serbian basketball player (born 1978)

Denso Iris

Personal information
- Born: May 4, 1988 (age 38) Beograd, SFR Yugoslavia
- Listed height: 1.92 m (6 ft 4 in)
- Listed weight: 107 kg (236 lb)

Career information
- NBA draft: 2000: undrafted
- Playing career: 1997–2013
- Position: Power forward
- Number: 5, 19, 30
- Coaching career: 2014–present

Career history

Playing
- 1997–1998: Srem
- 1998–2001: FMP Železnik
- 2001–2004: Atlas
- 2004: Azovmash
- 2004–2005: Khimki
- 2005–2006: PAOK
- 2006: Mornar Bar
- 2006–2007: Universitet Yugra Surgut
- 2007: BC Kalev
- 2007–2008: Vizura
- 2008: Kolossos Rodou
- 2008–2009: Igokea
- 2009–2010 2011–2012: Radnički Kragujevac
- 2012–2013: Vršac
- 2013: Radnički Kragujevac

Coaching
- 2014–2017: SCM U Craiova
- 2018–2019: Serbia Women (assistant)
- 2019–2020: Denso Iris
- 2020–2022: Denso Iris (assistant)
- 2022–present: Denso Iris

Vladimir Vuksanović (Serbian Cyrillic: Владимир Вуксановић; born January 14, 1978) is a Serbian professional basketball coach and former player, who is the head coach for the Denso Iris of the Women's Japan Basketball League.
