= Jin Weina =

Chinese basketball player

Personal information
- Born: 27 April 1992 (age 34) Xuzhou, Jiangsu, China
- Listed height: 5 ft 11 in (1.80 m)
- Position: Guard
- Number: 30

Career history
- 2009–2024: Jiangsu Sports Bureau
- 2024–2025: Sichuan Yuanda
- 2025–present: Jiangsu Phoenix
Medals
Women's basketball
Representing China
Asia Cup
Gold medal – first place	2023 Australia
Asian Games
Gold medal – first place	2022 Hangzhou	Team
Silver medal – second place	2014 Incheon	Team

Jin Weina (Chinese: 金维娜; pinyin: Jīn Wéinà; born 27 April 1992) is a Chinese basketball and 3x3 basketball player. She plays for the Chinese national team, and Jiangsu Sports Bureau, in the WCBA, from 2009 to 2022.

She participated at the 2022 FIBA Women's Basketball World Cup. winning a silver medal. She also was part of the China team who got a gold in the 2023 Asia Cup after a 73–71 victory against Japan.
