= Indian Railways women's basketball =

Indian Railways
- Nickname: Railways
- League: National Basketball Championship (India)
- Ownership: Railways Sports Promotion Board / Indian Railways

The Railways women's basketball team is the football section representing the Indian Railways in domestic competitions, most notably the National Basketball Championship.

== History ==
Indian Railways has been competing in the women's division of the National Basketball Championship as early as 1980.In 2003, Delhi upset Railways, breaking a long title streak that began in the 1980s.

Railways' dominance was disrupted in a few occasions. In 2014, Chhattisgarh won the title. In 2017, Telengana ended Railways' bid in the semifinals.

In January 2026, they won their eight consecutive National Championship title and the 41st overall. They represented the host country at the 2026 Women's Basketball League Asia in Bengaluru and finished last among six teams.
