= Song gao =

Shanghai snack

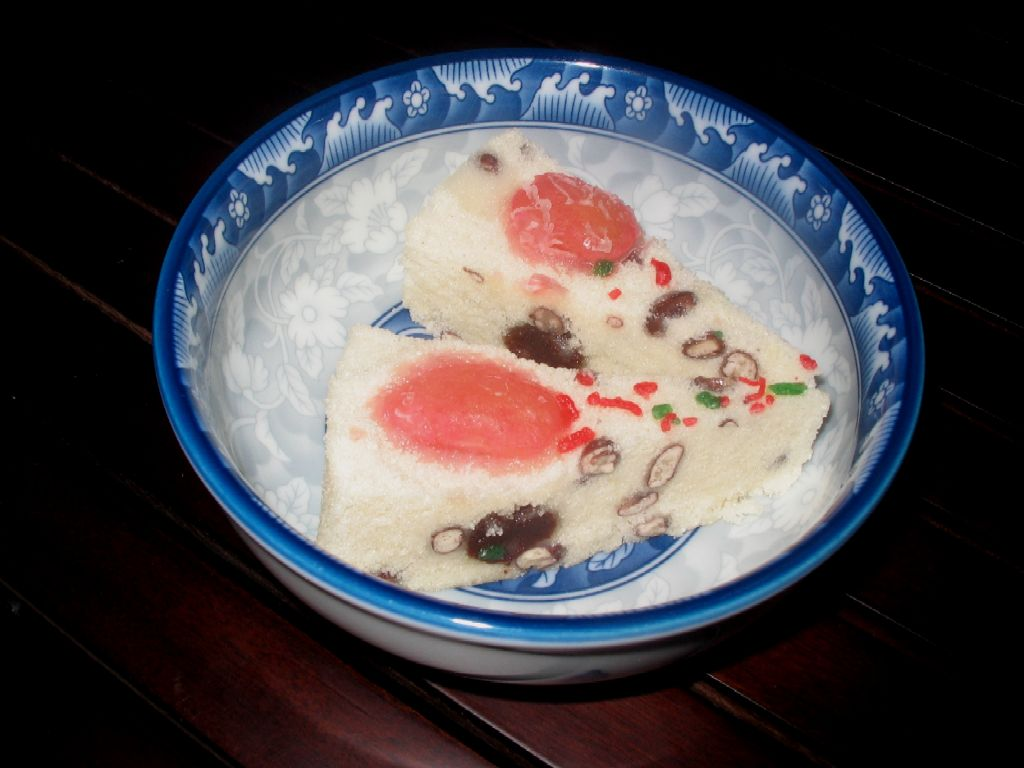
- Slices of song gao
- Type: Snack
- Place of origin: China
- Region or state: Shanghai
- Main ingredients: Rice flour, sugar, water, azuki beans

Song gao (Chinese: 鬆糕; pinyin: sōng gāo; lit. 'loose cake'; Shanghainese: Son^{1}-kau^{1}, Wu Chinese pronunciation: [soŋ kɔ]) is a Shanghai snack composed of rice flour, sugar, and water, with azuki beans embedded throughout the cake. Giant pink-colored azuki beans with a diameter of about 1 inch (25 mm) are embedded on top of the cake; conventional sized azuki beans are embedded inside the cake. The cake also has a red bean (azuki) paste filling. This dessert is steamed, as a large round cake and is then partitioned into sections for eating. Soong Mei-ling, who loved to eat song gao, had the Grand Hotel of Taipei to include her version of the cake on the hotel's menu, which the hotel continues to offer to this day.

== See also ==
- List of cakes
