= Cathay Life Tigers =

- Nickname: Cathay Life Tigers
- League: WSBL
- Founded: 1949 (as Chun-Teh); 1969 (as Cathay)
- Arena: Cathay Life Tamsui Education Center Gymnasium
- Location: New Taipei City, Taiwan
- Team colors: Yellow, Green
- Ownership: Cathay Life Insurance
- Championships: Social Division A: 13; WSBL: 20
- Website: cwb.cathaylife.com.tw

The Cathay Women Basketball Team (Chinese: 國泰女籃), also known as the Cathay Life Tigers, is a Taiwanese club which competes in the Women's Super Basketball League (WSBL)

== History ==
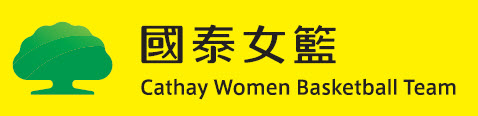
Other logo of the basketball team

The Cathay Life Insurance's women's basketball program originated from the Chun-Teh Girls' High School basketball program established in the 1940s by coach Hung Chin-sheng.

In January 1969, Cathay Life Insurance took over Chun-Teh's basketball team with Hung remaining coach. From the 1970s to the 1980s, Cathay was known for sourcing its players from the high school system.

They competed in the Social Division A basketball league in Taiwan where they won 13 consecutive titles. In December 2004, Cathay joined the Women's Super Basketball League (WSBL) as one its four founding teams. It won the inaugural 2005 season and went on to win its fourth consecutive title in 2009.

However in 2010, Cathay boycotted the WSBL after its former player Chiang Feng-chun, who had initially retired, joined Chunghwa Telecom, with Cathay disputing the validity of the signing under the league's player-registration rules.

Cathay returned to the WSBL in 2011 and resumed its dominance, winning 16 consecutive championships from 2011 through 2026.

== International competitions ==
Cathay Life has been a long time participant of the William Jones Cup in Taiwan. It finished as runners-up in the inaugural 1977 edition. It last won the 2012 edition.

As the Cathay Life Tigers representing Chinese Taipei, the team has also appeared in the first two editions of the Women's Basketball League Asia in 2024 and 2025 in mainland China. They are set to make their third consecutive appearance in the 2026 edition in Bengaluru, India.
