= Phoenix Hill Sports Park =

Sports venue in Chengdu, China

Coordinates: 30.771°N 104.076°E

Chengdu Phoenix Hill Sports Park (simplified Chinese: 成都凤凰山体育公园; traditional Chinese: 成都鳳凰山體育公園) is a major sports complex located in the Jinniu District of Chengdu, Sichuan, China. Designed by HKS Architects, it was constructed between 2010 and 2021 and officially opened in 2022. The park is a prominent landmark in Chengdu and has become a popular destination for sports enthusiasts and tourists alike.

== Key features ==
50,695-seat FIFA-standard football stadium: The centerpiece of the park, the stadium is the home of the Chengdu Rongcheng Football Club of the Chinese Super League.

15,000-seat NBA-standard basketball arena: known as Jinqiang International Event Center Arena is home to the Sichuan Blue Whales of the Chinese Basketball Association (CBA). It has also hosted various concerts and other events. It has hosted the 2021 Summer World University Games basketball.

== Major events ==
- 2021 Summer World University Games: The park hosted the basketball competition.
- Irish pop band Westlife concert for their The Wild Dreams Tour on September 20, 2023.

== Future plans ==
The Chengdu Phoenix Hill Sports Park is under development, with plans for additional facilities such as a sports museum and a hotel complex. The park is expected to be a major sports and leisure destination in Chengdu.
