= Monica Okoye =

Japanese basketball player (born 1999)

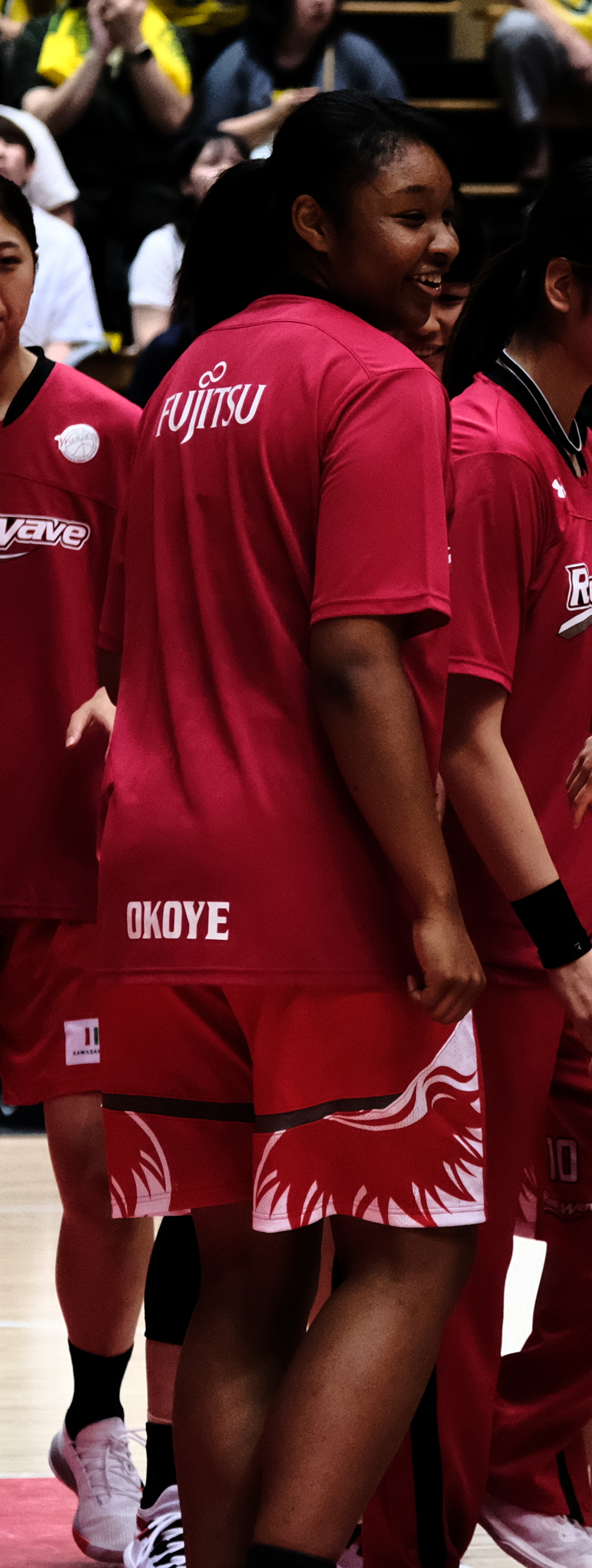
- Okoye with the Fujitsu Red Wave in 2019

No. 99 – Canberra Capitals
- Position: Forward
- League: WNBL

Personal information
- Born: 7 February 1999 (age 27) Tokyo, Japan
- Listed height: 183 cm (6 ft 0 in)

Career information
- High school: Myojo Gakuen (Tokyo, Japan)
- Playing career: 2017–present

Career history
- 2017–2019: Denso Iris
- 2019–2022: Fujitsu Red Wave
- 2022–2023: AO Eleutheria Moschato
- 2023: Geelong United Supercats
- 2023–present: Canberra Capitals

Monica Okoye (オコエ 桃仁花, Okoe Monika; born 7 February 1999) is a Japanese professional basketball player for the Canberra Capitals of the Women's National Basketball League (WNBL). She also plays for the Japanese national team.

== Early life ==
Okoye was born and raised in Tokyo, Japan. She attended Myojo Gakuen High School.

== Professional career ==
Okoye debuted in the Women's Japan Basketball League in the 2017–18 season with Denso Iris. She played two seasons for Denso before joining Fujitsu Red Wave in 2019, where she played three seasons.

For the 2022–23 season, Okoye joined AO Eleutheria Moschato of the Greek Women's Basketball League.

Okoye moved to Australia to play for the Geelong United Supercats of the NBL1 South in the 2023 season.

On 3 July 2023, Okoye signed with the Canberra Capitals of the Women's National Basketball League (WNBL) for the 2023–24 season.

== National team ==
Okoye played for the Japanese national team at the 2018 FIBA Women's Basketball World Cup. She competed at the 2020 Summer Olympics, winning a silver medal.

== Personal life ==
Monica's mother is Japanese and her father is Nigerian of Igbo descent. Her older brother, Louis, plays professional baseball for the Yomiuri Giants.
