= Sichuan Yuanda Meile =

- League: WCBA
- Founded: 1958
- History: Sichuan Yuanda Meile (2019–present)
- Location: Sichuan, China

The Sichuan Yuanda Meile Basketball Club (Chinese: 四川远达美乐篮球俱乐部) is a Chinese basketball team based in Sichuan which plays in the Women's Chinese Basketball Association.

== History ==
=== Early years ===
In 1958, the men's and women's provincial basketball team for Sichuan was established. The Xinan women's team which won the national championships in 1955 was its predecessor. However women's team struggled in the National Games with its best finish in the 20th century being fifth in 1959 and 1975.

It has competed in the National Women's Basketball A Division League. It relegated to the second division in 1999.

=== 2000–2019 ===
At the 2001 National Games, Sichuan reached the women's basketball finals. However for the next two decades the team has failed to advanced from the preliminaries.

In 2014, Sichuan entered the Women's Chinese Basketball Association (WCBA) by acquiring the franchise of Yunnan's team. However they got relegated again in 2015. They returned again to the WCBA in 2016.

=== Under the Yuanda Group: 2019–present ===
In October 2019, the Sichuan Yuanda Group Co., Ltd. formally took over the basketball team adopting the name "Sichuan Yuanda Meile Basketball Club".

Sichuan Yuanda Meile won the 2022 National Women's Basketball Championship, its first ever top-level China national championship since its inception. It then went on to win its first WCBA title in the 2022–23 season.

Sichuan then qualified for the 2024 Women's Basketball League Asia in Chengdu and won the inaugural title. They returned in the third edition in 2026 to be hosted in Bengaluru, India.
