= Wu Tongtong =

Chinese basketball player

Xinjiang Tianshan
- Position: Guard
- League: WCBA

Personal information
- Born: 27 June 1994 (age 32) Fuxin, China
- Listed height: 1.75 m (5 ft 9 in)

Career information
- Playing career: 2015–present

Career history
- 2015–2024: Shanxi Flame
- 2024–present: Xinjiang Tianshan
Medals
Women's basketball
Representing China
World Cup
Silver medal – second place	2022 Australia
FIBA Asia Cup
Silver medal – second place	2021 Jordan

Wu Tongtong (Chinese: 武桐桐; pinyin: Wǔ Tóngtóng; born 26 June 1994) is a Chinese basketball player. She is part of the Chinese team in the women's tournament at the 2020 Summer Olympics.
