= Women's Super Basketball League =

Top-tier women's basketball league in Taiwan

Women's Super Basketball League (WSBL)
- Sport: Basketball
- Founded: 2004
- First season: 2005
- No. of teams: 4
- Country: Taiwan
- Continent: FIBA Asia (Asia)
- Most recent champion: Cathay Life (20th title)
- Most titles: Cathay Life (20th titles)
- Level on pyramid: 1
- Website: wsbl.meetagile.com (in Chinese)

The Women's Super Basketball League (WSBL) is the top-tier women's basketball league in Taiwan.

== Current clubs ==
- Cathay Life (國泰人壽)
- Chunghwa Telecom (中華電信)
- Taipower (台灣電力)
- Taiyuan (台元)

== Regular season standings ==
The regular season standings are listed below:

Season	First place	Second place	Third place	Fourth place	Fifth place	Sixth place
2005	Cathay Life	Taiyuan Textile	Chunghwa Telecom	Taiwan Power		
2006	Cathay Life	Taiyuan Textile	Chunghwa Telecom	Taiwan Power		
2007	Cathay Life	Chunghwa Telecom	Taiyuan Textile	Taiwan Power		
2009	Cathay Life	Chunghwa Telecom	Taiyuan Textile	Taiwan Power	Fo Guang	
2010	Taiyuan Textile	Chunghwa Telecom	Taiwan Power	Fo Guang		
2011	Cathay Life	Taiyuan Textile	Taiwan Power	Chunghwa Telecom	Ebers	Fo Guang
2012	Cathay Life	Chunghwa Telecom	Taiwan Power	Taiyuan Textile		
2013	Cathay Life	Chunghwa Telecom	Taiwan Power	Taiyuan Textile		
2014	Cathay Life	Chunghwa Telecom	Taiyuan Textile	Taiwan Power		
2015	Cathay Life	Taiyuan Textile	Chunghwa Telecom	Taiwan Power		
2016	Cathay Life	Taiyuan Textile	Chunghwa Telecom	Taiwan Power		
2017	Cathay Life	Chunghwa Telecom	Taiyuan Textile	Taiwan Power		
2018	Cathay Life	Taiyuan Textile	Chunghwa Telecom	Taiwan Power		
2019	Cathay Life	Chunghwa Telecom	Taiyuan Textile	Taiwan Power		
2020	Cathay Life	Taiyuan Textile	Chunghwa Telecom	Taiwan Power		
2021	Cathay Life	Taiyuan Textile	Chunghwa Telecom	Taiwan Power		
2022	Cathay Life	Taiyuan Textile	Taiwan Power	Chunghwa Telecom		
2023	Cathay Life	Taiyuan Textile	Chunghwa Telecom	Taiwan Power		
2024	Taiyuan Textile	Cathay Life	Taiwan Power	Chunghwa Telecom		
2025	Taiyuan	Cathay Life	Chunghwa Telecom	Taiwan Power		
2026	Cathay Life	Chunghwa Telecom	Taiyuan	Taiwan Power		

== Postseason standings ==
The league champions and other postseason standings are listed below:

Season	Champions	Runners-up	Third place	Fourth place
2005	Cathay Life	Taiyuan Textile	Chunghwa Telecom	Taiwan Power
2006	Cathay Life	Taiyuan Textile	Chunghwa Telecom	Taiwan Power
2007	Cathay Life	Chunghwa Telecom	Taiyuan Textile	Taiwan Power
2009	Cathay Life	Chunghwa Telecom	Taiyuan Textile	Taiwan Power
2010	Taiyuan Textile	Chunghwa Telecom	Taiwan Power	Fo Guang
2011	Cathay Life	Taiyuan Textile	Taiwan Power	Chunghwa Telecom
2012	Cathay Life	Chunghwa Telecom	Taiyuan Textile	Taiwan Power
2013	Cathay Life	Chunghwa Telecom	Taiyuan Textile	Taiwan Power
2014	Cathay Life	Chunghwa Telecom	Taiyuan Textile	Taiwan Power
2015	Cathay Life	Taiyuan Textile	Chunghwa Telecom	Taiwan Power
2016	Cathay Life	Taiyuan Textile	Chunghwa Telecom	Taiwan Power
2017	Cathay Life	Chunghwa Telecom	Taiwan Power	Taiyuan Textile
2018	Cathay Life	Taiyuan Textile	Chunghwa Telecom	Taiwan Power
2019	Cathay Life	Chunghwa Telecom	Taiyuan Textile	Taiwan Power
2020	Cathay Life	Taiyuan Textile	Chunghwa Telecom	Taiwan Power
2021	Cathay Life	Taiyuan Textile	Taiwan Power	Chunghwa Telecom
2022	Cathay Life	Taiyuan Textile	Taiwan Power	Chunghwa Telecom
2023	Cathay Life	Taiyuan Textile	Chunghwa Telecom	Taiwan Power
2024	Cathay Life	Taiyuan Textile	Taiwan Power	Chunghwa Telecom
2025	Cathay Life	Taiyuan	Chunghwa Telecom	Taiwan Power
2026	Cathay Life	Chunghwa Telecom	Taiyuan	Taiwan Power

== See also ==
- Women's Basketball League Asia
- Chinese Taipei women's national basketball team
- List of basketball leagues
- Sport in Taiwan
- Super Basketball League (SBL)
