= Kang Lee-seul =

South Korean basketball player

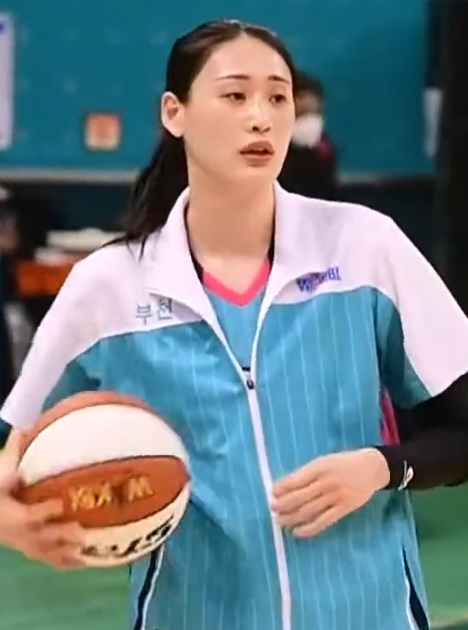

No. 11 – Cheongju KB Stars
- Position: Forward
- League: WKBL

Personal information
- Born: 5 April 1994 (age 32) Sacheon, South Korea
- Listed height: 5 ft 11 in (1.80 m)
- Listed weight: 154 lb (70 kg)

Career information
- WNBA draft: 2016: undrafted
- Stats at Basketball Reference
Medals
Women's basketball
Representing South Korea
Asian Games
Bronze medal – third place	2022 Hangzhou	Team
Representing Korea
Asian Games
Silver medal – second place	2018 Jakarta	Team

Kang Lee-seul (Korean: 강이슬, Kang Iseul, born 5 April 1994) is a South Korean basketball player for Cheongju KB Stars and the South Korean national team.

She participated at the 2018 FIBA Women's Basketball World Cup.
