= National Basketball Championship (women) =

Indian National Basketball Championship for Women is an inter-state women's national level basketball tournament in India. This tournament is held by the Basketball Federation of India. 23 state teams have participated in this tournament.

== History ==
At the 2019 event, Indian Railways team staved off Kerala 68–55. Led by the new national team player Shireen Limaye, Railways won their third straight title. Madhya Pradesh also secured a rare podium finish by beating Punjab in the bronze medal game.

In the semifinals, Kerala ousted Punjab 73-62 while Railways absolutely decimated Madhya Pradesh 106–37 to reach the finals.

== Teams ==
The participating teams are:

Upper Pool

1. Andhra Pradesh
2. Chhattisgarh
3. Delhi
4. Railways
5. Karnataka
6. Kerala
7. Maharashtra
8. Punjab
9. Tamil Nadu
10. Uttar Pradesh

Lower Pool

1. Bihar
2. Chandigarh
3. Gujarat
4. Haryana
5. Himachal Pradesh
6. Jammu and Kashmir
7. Jharkhand
8. Madhya Pradesh
9. Odisha
10. Puducherry
11. Rajasthan
12. Uttarakhand
13. West Bengal

== Championships ==
Year	Champion	Runner-up	Ref.
2023	Railways	Kerala	
2024	Railways	Kerala	

== See also ==
- National Basketball Championship (men)
- Women's Basketball League Asia
