= Denso Iris =

Denso Iris デンソーアイリス
- League: Women's Japan Basketball League
- Founded: 1962
- Arena: Wing Arena Kariya
- Location: Kariya, Aichi
- Ownership: Denso
- Website: iris.denso.com
Home	Away

The Denso Iris (デンソーアイリス, Densō Airisu) are a Japanese professional basketball team based in Kariya, Aichi. The Iris compete in the "Premier" first division of the Women's Japan Basketball League (WJBL). Founded in 1962, the team's name is a reference to the flower of Kariya, the Iris laevigata. The team plays its home games at Wing Arena Kariya.

Denso Iris won their first ever WJBL title in the 2025–26 season. They qualified as Japan's representative for the 2026 Women's Basketball League Asia. They became the first Japanese side to win the tournament.

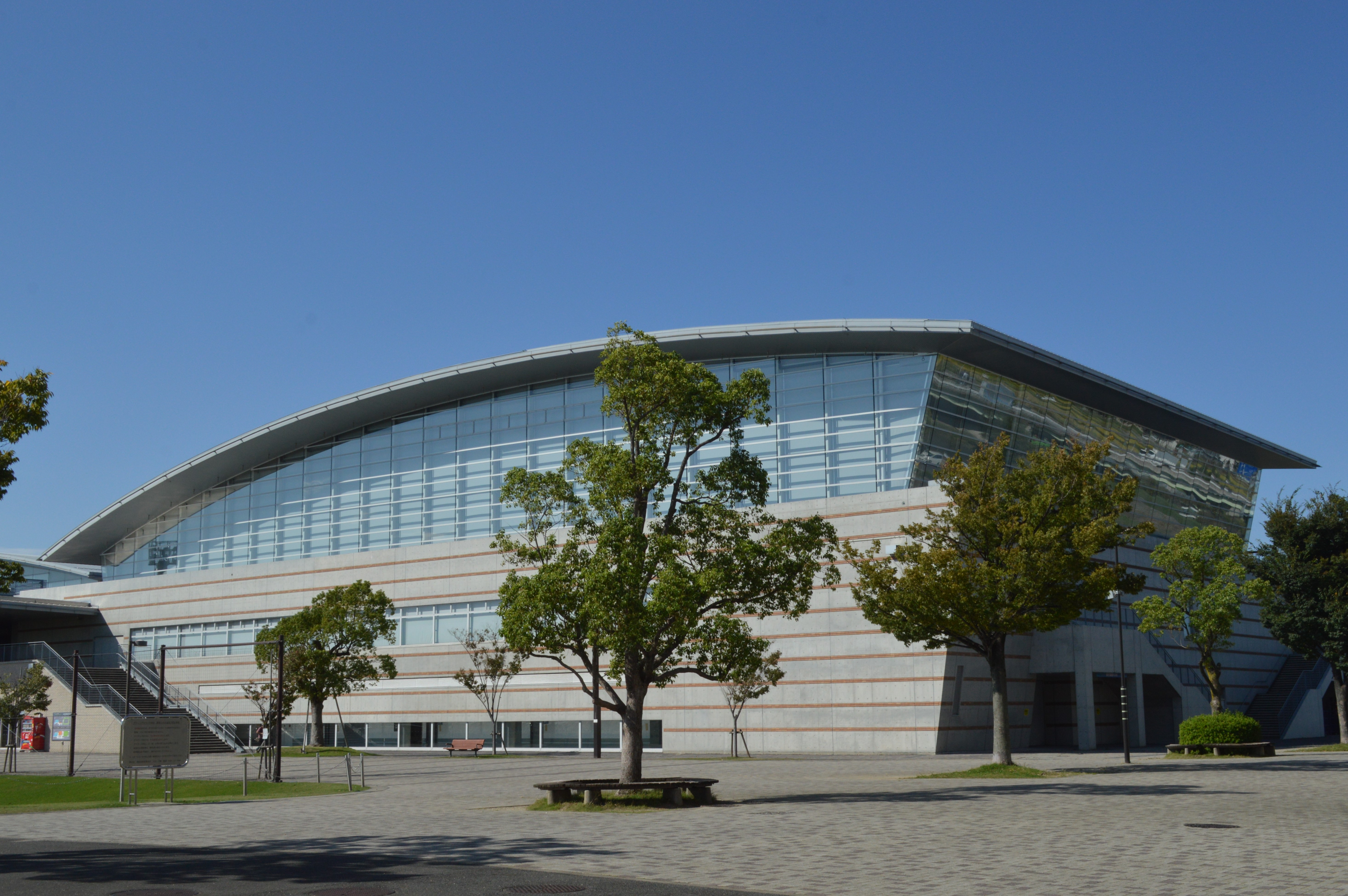
Wing Arena Kariya

== Notable players ==
- Arisa Fujiwara
- Kumiko Ōba
- Maki Takada
- Atsuko Watanabe

== Coaches ==
- Hirofumi Kojima
- Vladimir Vuksanović
