= Maki Takada =

Japanese basketball player

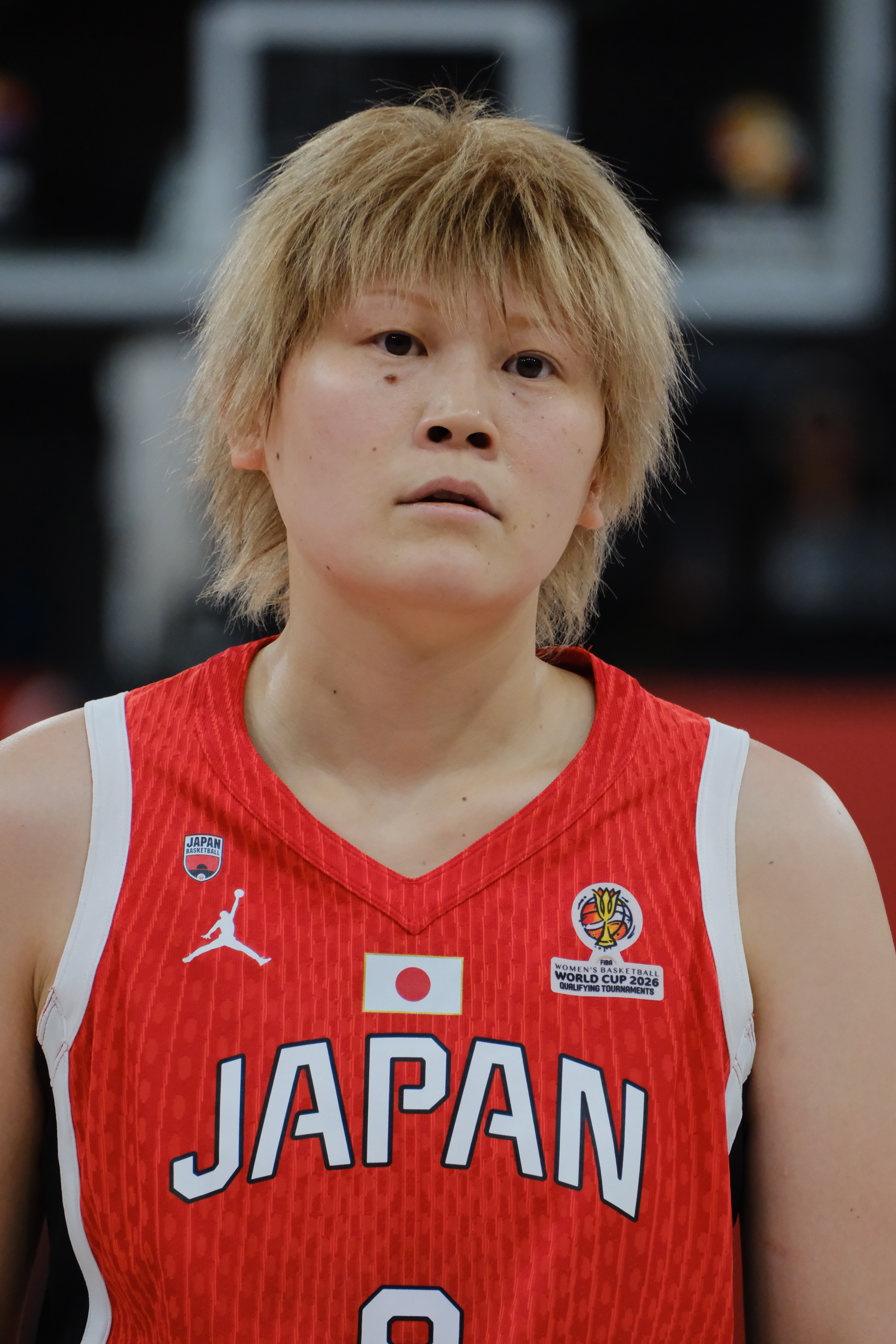
- Takada in 2026

No. 8 – Denso Iris
- Position: Center
- League: JBL

Personal information
- Born: 23 August 1989 (age 37) Toyohashi, Japan
- Listed height: 6 ft 1 in (1.85 m)
- Listed weight: 168 lb (76 kg)

Career information
- WNBA draft: 2011: undrafted
Medals
Women's basketball
Representing Japan
Olympic Games
Silver medal – second place	2020 Tokyo	Team
FIBA Asia Cup
Gold medal – first place	2015 Wuhan
Gold medal – first place	2017 India
Gold medal – first place	2019 India
Silver medal – second place	2023 Australia
Silver medal – second place	2025 China
Bronze medal – third place	2009 Chennai
Bronze medal – third place	2011 Omura
Asian Games
Silver medal – second place	2022 Hangzhou	Team
Bronze medal – third place	2010 Guangzhou	Team
East Asian Games
Bronze medal – third place	2009 Hong Kong

Maki Takada (髙田真希, Takada Maki, born 23 August 1989) is a Japanese basketball player. She represented Japan in the basketball competition at the 2016 Summer Olympics, as well as at the 2020 Summer Olympics, winning a silver medal.
