= Cheongju KB Stars =

South Korean women's basketball club

- League: Women's Korean Basketball League
- Founded: 1963; 63 years ago
- History: Kookmin Bank Women's Basketball Club; 1963–2000; Seongnam Kookmin Bank Savers; 2000; Cheonan Kookmin Bank Savers; 2001–2003; Cheonan KB Savers; 2003–2011; Cheongju KB Stars; 2011–present
- Arena: Cheongju Gymnasium
- Capacity: 4,183
- Location: Cheongju, South Korea
- Team colors: Yellow, gray
- Head coach: Kim Wan-soo
- Ownership: Lee Hwan-ju
- Affiliation: Kookmin Bank
- Championships: 3 Korean Leagues
- Retired numbers: 2 (10, 23)
- Website: wkbl.or.kr
Home	Away

The Cheongju KB Stars (Korean: 청주 KB 스타즈) is a South Korean professional basketball club playing in the Women's Korean Basketball League (WKBL).

== Honours ==
- WKBL Championship

Winners (3): 2018–19, 2021–22, 2025–26
Runners-up (7): 2002 (winter), 2006 (summer), 2011–12, 2014–15, 2017–18, 2020–21, 2023–24

- WKBL Regular Season

Winners (6): 2002 (winter), 2006 (summer), 2018–19, 2021–22, 2023–24, 2025–26
Runners-up (5): 2004 (winter), 2005 (summer), 2017–18, 2019–20, 2020–21
