= 2022 FIBA Women's Basketball World Cup final =

2022 FIBA Women's Basketball World Cup Final
China	United States
(China)	(United States)
61	83
	1	2	3	4	Total
China	13	20	14	14	61
United States	18	25	25	15	83
- Date: 1 October 2022
- Venue: Sydney SuperDome, Sydney
- Referees: Gatis Saliņš (LAT); Julio Anaya (PAN); Wojciech Liszka (POL)
- Attendance: 15,895

The 2022 FIBA Women's Basketball World Cup Final was a basketball game that took place on 1 October 2022 at the Sydney SuperDome in Sydney, Australia, to determine the winner of the 2022 FIBA Women's Basketball World Cup.

The United States defeated China to capture their fourth consecutive and eleventh overall title.

== Road to the final ==
China		Round	United States	
Opponent	Result	Group stage	Opponent	Result
South Korea	107–44	Match 1	Belgium	87–72
Bosnia and Herzegovina	98–51	Match 2	Puerto Rico	106–42
United States	63–77	Match 3	China	77–63
Puerto Rico	95–60	Match 4	South Korea	145–69
Belgium	81–55	Match 5	Bosnia and Herzegovina	121–59
Pos / Team / Pld / Pts; 1 / United States / 5 / 10; 2 / China / 5 / 9; 3 / Belgium / 5 / 8; 4 / Puerto Rico / 5 / 7; 5 / South Korea / 5 / 6; 6 / Bosnia and Herzegovina / 5 / 5; Source: FIBA		Final standing	Pos / Team / Pld / Pts; 1 / United States / 5 / 10; 2 / China / 5 / 9; 3 / Belgium / 5 / 8; 4 / Puerto Rico / 5 / 7; 5 / South Korea / 5 / 6; 6 / Bosnia and Herzegovina / 5 / 5; Source: FIBA	
Opponent	Result	Knockout stage	Opponent	Result
France	85–71	Quarter-finals	Serbia	88–55
Australia	61–59	Semifinals	Canada	83–43

== Match details ==
1 October 2022
16:00

Boxscore

China	61–83	United States
Scoring by quarter: 13–18, 20–25, 14–25, 14–15
Pts: Li Yue. 19; Rebs: Li Yue. 12; Asts: Yang 4		Pts: Wilson 19; Rebs: Thomas 9 Asts: Gray 8

Sydney SuperDome, Sydney
Attendance: 15,895
Referees: Gatis Saliņš (LAT), Julio Anaya (PAN), Wojciech Liszka (POL)

Starters:			Pts	Reb	Ast
PG	7	Yang Liwei	3	1	4
SG	5	Wang Siyu	11	1	3
SF	10	Zhang Ru	2	1	1
PF	11	Huang Sijing	2	8	3
C	14	Li Yueru	19	12	0
Reserves:					
G	4	Li Yuan	0	0	0
G	6	Wu Tongtong	13	0	3
G	8	Jin Weina	3	1	0
SG	9	Li Meng	DNP		
F	12	Pan Zhenqi	0	0	0
C	13	Dilixiati Dilana	DNP		
C	15	Han Xu	8	6	1
Head coach:
(Chinese Basketball Association (organisation)) Zheng Wei

China	United States

China	Statistics	United States
19/40 (47.5%)	2-pt field goals	24/50 (48%)
5/16 (31.3%)	3-pt field goals	9/24 (37.5%)
8/10 (80%)	Free throws	8/11 (72.7%)
7	Offensive rebounds	13
28	Defensive rebounds	24
35	Total rebounds	37
15	Assists	22
19	Turnovers	7
2	Steals	13
1	Blocks	5
12	Fouls	14

2022 World Champions

United States
(11th title)

Starters:			Pts	Reb	Ast
PG	4	Jewell Loyd	11	0	2
SG	8	Chelsea Gray	10	4	8
SF	12	Alyssa Thomas	5	9	2
PF	10	Breanna Stewart	9	6	6
C	9	A'ja Wilson	19	5	0
Reserves:					
G	6	Sabrina Ionescu	0	0	0
G	7	Ariel Atkins	6	3	1
F	11	Kahleah Copper	DNP		
C	13	Shakira Austin	0	2	0
C	14	Betnijah Laney	4	1	0
C	15	Brionna Jones	2	4	0
Head coach:
(USA Basketball) Cheryl Reeve
