= 2022 FIBA Women's Basketball World Cup Group A =

Group A of the 2022 FIBA Women's Basketball World Cup took place from 22 to 27 September 2022. The group consisted of Belgium, Bosnia and Herzegovina, China, Puerto Rico, South Korea, and the United States.

The top four teams advanced to the quarterfinals.

== Teams ==
Puerto Rico replaced Russia, who were expelled.

Team	Qualification		Appearance			Best Performance	FIBA World Ranking	FIBA Zone Ranking
Team	Method	Date	Last	Total	Streak	Best Performance	FIBA World Ranking	FIBA Zone Ranking
United States	Olympic champions	8 August 2021	2018	18	16	Champions (1953, 1957, 1979, 1986, 1990, 1998, 2002, 2010, 2014, 2018)	1	1
Bosnia and Herzegovina	Qualifying Tournament	5 February 2022	Debut				26	17
China	Qualifying Tournament	11 February 2022	2018	11	11	Runners-up (1994)	7	2
South Korea	Qualifying Tournament	12 February 2022	2018	16	16	Runners-up (1967, 1979)	13	4
Belgium	Qualifying Tournament	13 February 2022	2018	2	2	Fourth place (2018)	5	2
Puerto Rico	Replacement	18 May 2022	2018	2	2	16th place (2018)	17	4

== Standings ==
Pos	Team	Pld	W	L	PF	PA	PD	Pts	Qualification
1	United States	5	5	0	536	305	+231	10	Final round
2	China	5	4	1	444	287	+157	9	Final round
3	Belgium	5	3	2	364	349	+15	8	Final round
4	Puerto Rico	5	2	3	341	400	−59	7	Final round
5	South Korea	5	1	4	346	494	−148	6	
6	Bosnia and Herzegovina	5	0	5	289	485	−196	5	

Source: FIBA
Rules for classification: 1) Points; 2) Head-to-head results; 3) Points difference; 4) Points scored.

== Games ==
All times are local (UTC+10).

=== Bosnia and Herzegovina vs Puerto Rico ===
22 September 2022
10:30

Boxscore

Bosnia and Herzegovina	58–82	Puerto Rico
Scoring by quarter: 16–31, 20–22, 9–16, 13–13
Pts: Jones 15; Rebs: Elez, Jones 8 Asts: Jones 4		Pts: Guirantes 26; Rebs: Guirantes 9 Asts: Guirantes 8

State Sports Centre, Sydney
Attendance: 767
Referees: Scott Beker (AUS), Yasmina Alcaraz (ESP), Daigo Urushima (JPN)

=== United States vs Belgium ===
22 September 2022
11:30

Boxscore

United States	87–72	Belgium
Scoring by quarter: 32–22, 16–17, 24–17, 15–16
Pts: Stewart 22; Rebs: Thomas 7 Asts: Thomas 9		Pts: Vanloo 13; Rebs: Linskens 10; Asts: three players 4

Sydney SuperDome, Sydney
Attendance: 2,277
Referees: Wojciech Liszka (POL), Andreia Silva (BRA), Ariadna Chueca (ESP)

=== South Korea vs China ===
22 September 2022
17:30

Boxscore

South Korea	44–107	China
Scoring by quarter: 11–27, 9–27, 12–26, 12–27
Pts: Park J. 14; Rebs: An 4 Asts: three players 2		Pts: Li M., Yang 14; Rebs: Han 15; Asts: three players 4

Sydney SuperDome, Sydney
Attendance: 6,093
Referees: Maripier Malo (CAN), Christopher Reid (AUS), Martin Vulić (CRO)

=== Puerto Rico vs United States ===
23 September 2022
10:30

Boxscore

Puerto Rico	42–106	United States
Scoring by quarter: 11–27, 10–27, 6–26, 15–26
Pts: Hollingshed 10; Rebs: Guirantes 6 Asts: Rosado 3		Pts: Austin 19; Rebs: Austin 10; Asts: Atkins, Jones 5

State Sports Centre, Sydney
Attendance: 1,372
Referees: Yu Jung (TPE), Özlem Yalman (TUR), Joyce Muchenu (ZIM)

=== Belgium vs South Korea ===
23 September 2022
13:00

Boxscore

Belgium	84–61	South Korea
Scoring by quarter: 26–12, 24–18, 19–20, 15–11
Pts: Ben Abdelkader 17; Rebs: Meesseman 10; Asts: Allemand 8		Pts: Kang 11; Rebs: An, Park J. 4 Asts: Kim D., Park J. 3

State Sports Centre, Sydney
Attendance: 1,498
Referees: Scott Beker (AUS), Daigo Urushima (JPN), Amir Taboubi (TUN)

=== China vs Bosnia and Herzegovina ===
23 September 2022
14:30

Boxscore

China	98–51	Bosnia and Herzegovina
Scoring by quarter: 26–21, 24–10, 32–15, 16–5
Pts: Han 18; Rebs: Li Yue. 9 Asts: Li Yua. 7		Pts: Jones 17; Rebs: Jones 9 Asts: Elez 5

Sydney SuperDome, Sydney
Attendance: 986
Referees: Maj Forsberg (DEN), Julio Anaya (PAN), Sara El-Sharnouby (EGY)

=== United States vs China ===
24 September 2022
14:30

Boxscore

United States	77–63	China
Scoring by quarter: 18–13, 26–12, 12–22, 21–16
Pts: Wilson 20; Rebs: Stewart 9 Asts: Thomas 5		Pts: Li M. 21; Rebs: Li Yue., Han 6 Asts: Wang 6

Sydney SuperDome, Sydney
Attendance: 9,447
Referees: Scott Beker (AUS), Viola Györgyi (NOR), Martin Vulić (CRO)

=== Bosnia and Herzegovina vs South Korea ===
24 September 2022
18:00

Boxscore

Bosnia and Herzegovina	66–99	South Korea
Scoring by quarter: 20–25, 17–20, 15–31, 14–23
Pts: Jones 21; Rebs: Jones 9 Asts: Tavić 6		Pts: Kang 37; Rebs: Kang 8 Asts: Kim D. 8

Sydney SuperDome, Sydney
Attendance: 1,072
Referees: Julio Anaya (PAN), Yu Jung (TPE), Ariadna Chueca (ESP)

=== Puerto Rico vs Belgium ===
24 September 2022
20:30

Boxscore

Puerto Rico	65–68	Belgium
Scoring by quarter: 11–12, 20–19, 17–18, 17–19
Pts: Guirantes 27; Rebs: Guirantes 10; Asts: Guirantes 4		Pts: Linskens 24; Rebs: Linskens 13; Asts: Meesseman 11

Sydney SuperDome, Sydney
Attendance: 1,189
Referees: Gatis Saliņš (LAT), Maripier Malo (CAN), Christopher Reid (AUS)

=== Belgium vs Bosnia and Herzegovina ===
26 September 2022
11:30

Boxscore

Belgium	85–55	Bosnia and Herzegovina
Scoring by quarter: 17–12, 20–10, 25–17, 23–16
Pts: Ben Adbelkader 18; Rebs: Meesseman 8 Asts: Allemand 9		Pts: Elez, Tavić 13; Rebs: Jones 8 Asts: Džombeta, Tavić 2

Sydney SuperDome, Sydney
Attendance: 929
Referees: Scott Beker (AUS), Viola Györgyi (NOR), Yasmina Alcaraz (ESP)

=== South Korea vs United States ===
26 September 2022
14:00

Boxscore

South Korea	69–145	United States
Scoring by quarter: 21–32, 19–36, 12–38, 17–39
Pts: Park H. 17; Rebs: An 5 Asts: Kim D., Park H. 3		Pts: Jones 24; Rebs: four players 8 Asts: Plum 9

Sydney SuperDome, Sydney
Attendance: 1,522
Referees: Martin Vulić (CRO), Sara El-Sharnouby (EGY), Yana Nikogossyan (KAZ)

=== China vs Puerto Rico ===
26 September 2022
17:30

Boxscore

China	95–60	Puerto Rico
Scoring by quarter: 25–15, 26–10, 21–17, 23–18
Pts: Li Yue. 16; Rebs: Li Yue., Wang 8 Asts: Li Yua. 9		Pts: San Antonio 19; Rebs: Vargas 6 Asts: Quiñones 3

Sydney SuperDome, Sydney
Attendance: 3,389
Referees: Maj Forsberg (DEN), Maripier Malo (CAN), Daigo Urushima (JPN)

=== Puerto Rico vs South Korea ===
27 September 2022
11:3073

Boxscore

Puerto Rico	92–73	South Korea
Scoring by quarter: 28–10, 23–20, 21–17, 20–26
Pts: Hollingshed 29; Rebs: Hollingshed 12; Asts: Guirantes 5		Pts: Kang 22; Rebs: Shin 5 Asts: Park H. 6

Sydney SuperDome, Sydney
Attendance: 667
Referees: Gatis Saliņš (LAT), Viola Györgyi (NOR), Andreia Silva (BRA)

=== China vs Belgium ===
27 September 2022
13:30

Boxscore

China	81–55	Belgium
Scoring by quarter: 17–14, 18–14, 19–17, 27–10
Pts: Li M. 16; Rebs: Li Yue. 9 Asts: Yang, Wang 6		Pts: Linskens 14; Rebs: Linskens 7 Asts: Allemand 4

State Sports Centre, Sydney
Attendance: 1,314
Referees: Wojciech Liszka (POL), Maripier Malo (CAN), Sara El-Sharnouby (EGY)

=== United States vs Bosnia and Herzegovina ===
27 September 2022
14:00

Boxscore

United States	121–59	Bosnia and Herzegovina
Scoring by quarter: 33–15, 30–16, 29–13, 29–15
Pts: Plum 20; Rebs: Stewart 7 Asts: Gray, Plum 7		Pts: Elez 19; Rebs: Jones 10; Asts: Deura, Džombeta 4

Sydney SuperDome, Sydney
Attendance: 1,293
Referees: Scott Beker (AUS), Daigo Urushima (JPN), Amir Taboubi (TUN)
