= 2022 FIBA Women's Basketball World Cup final round =

The final round of the 2022 FIBA Women's Basketball World Cup took place from 29 September to 1 October 2022.

== Qualified teams ==
The top four teams from each group qualified for the final round.

Group	Winners	Runners-up	Third place	Fourth place
A	United States	China	Belgium	Puerto Rico
B	Australia	Canada	Serbia	France

== Bracket ==
A draw was conducted to decide the pairings of the quarterfinals. The two best-ranked teams in each group were drawn against the two teams ranked third and fourth in the other group.

Quarter-finals
29 September
Belgium	69
Australia	86
29 September
China	85
France	71
29 September
Puerto Rico	60
Canada	79
29 September
United States	88
Serbia	55

Semi-finals
30 September
Australia	59
China	61
30 September
Canada	43
United States	83

Final
1 October
China	61
United States	83
Third place
1 October
Australia	95
Canada	65

All times are local (UTC+10).

== Quarterfinals ==
=== United States vs Serbia ===
29 September 2022
12:00

Boxscore

United States	88–55	Serbia
Scoring by quarter: 25–23, 25–10, 16–7, 22–15
Pts: Plum 17; Rebs: Thomas 14; Asts: Thomas 7		Pts: Anderson 14; Rebs: Raca 7 Asts: Anderson 7

Sydney SuperDome, Sydney
Attendance: 1,327
Referees: Gatis Saliņš (LAT), Scott Beker (AUS), Wojciech Liszka (POL)

=== Puerto Rico vs Canada ===
29 September 2022
14:30

Boxscore

Puerto Rico	60–79	Canada
Scoring by quarter: 11–26, 12–18, 19–16, 18–19
Pts: Guirantes 19; Rebs: Hollingshed 12; Asts: Guirantes 3		Pts: Nurse 17; Rebs: Alexander 13; Asts: Colley 6

Sydney SuperDome, Sydney
Attendance: 1,437
Referees: Julio Anaya (PAN), Viola Györgyi (NOR), Daigo Urushima (JPN)

=== China vs France ===
29 September 2022
18:00

Boxscore

China	85–71	France
Scoring by quarter: 25–25, 25–14, 16–19, 19–13
Pts: Li M. 23; Rebs: Han 9 Asts: Li Yua. 7		Pts: Fauthoux 19; Rebs: Michel 6 Asts: Michel, Williams 6

Sydney SuperDome, Sydney
Attendance: 6,241
Referees: Maj Forsberg (DEN), Martin Vulić (CRO), Blanca Burns (USA)

=== Belgium vs Australia ===
29 September 2022
20:30

Boxscore

Belgium	69–86	Australia
Scoring by quarter: 16–26, 21–26, 11–20, 21–14
Pts: Allemand 15; Rebs: Linskens 5 Asts: Allemand 7		Pts: George 19; Rebs: Blicavs, George 9 Asts: Talbot 9

Sydney SuperDome, Sydney
Attendance: 8,421
Referees: Amy Bonner (USA), Maripier Malo (CAN), Johnny Batista (PUR)

== Semifinals ==
=== Canada vs United States ===
30 September 2022
17:00

Boxscore

Canada	43–83	United States
Scoring by quarter: 7–27, 14–18, 8–22, 14–16
Pts: Amihere 8 Rebs: Carleton, Kyei 5 Asts: Achonwa, König 2		Pts: Stewart 17; Rebs: Wilson 12; Asts: Gray 8

Sydney SuperDome, Sydney
Attendance: 5,661
Referees: Julio Anaya (PAN), Andreia Silva (BRA), Viola Györgyi (NOR)

=== Australia vs China ===
30 September 2022
19:30

Boxscore

Australia	59–61	China
Scoring by quarter: 17–13, 13–23, 14–11, 15–14
Pts: Whitcomb 15; Rebs: Talbot 10; Asts: Talbot, Whitcomb 3		Pts: Han 19; Rebs: Han 11; Asts: Yang 4

Sydney SuperDome, Sydney
Attendance: 11,916
Referees: Gatis Saliņš (LAT), Wojciech Liszka (POL), Martin Vulić (CRO)

== Third place game ==
1 October 2022
13:00

Boxscore

Australia	95–65	Canada
Scoring by quarter: 27–21, 24–22, 20–11, 24–11
Pts: Jackson 30; Rebs: Talbot 8 Asts: Talbot 8		Pts: Nurse 19; Rebs: Amihere 5 Asts: Fields 4

Sydney SuperDome, Sydney
Attendance: 9,454
Referees: Amy Bonner (USA), Maj Forsberg (DEN), Blanca Burns (USA)

== Final ==
1 October 2022
16:00

Boxscore

China	61–83	United States
Scoring by quarter: 13–18, 20–25, 14–25, 14–15
Pts: Li Yue. 19; Rebs: Li Yue. 12; Asts: Yang 4		Pts: Wilson 19; Rebs: Thomas 9 Asts: Gray 8

Sydney SuperDome, Sydney
Attendance: 15,895
Referees: Gatis Saliņš (LAT), Julio Anaya (PAN), Wojciech Liszka (POL)
