= 2022 FIBA Women's Basketball World Cup Group B =

Group B of the 2022 FIBA Women's Basketball World Cup took place from 22 to 27 September 2022. The group consisted of Australia, Canada, France, Japan, Mali, and Serbia.

The top four teams advanced to the quarterfinals.

== Teams ==
Mali replaced Nigeria, who withdrew.

Team	Qualification		Appearance			Best Performance	FIBA World Ranking	FIBA Zone Ranking
Team	Method	Date	Last	Total	Streak	Best Performance	FIBA World Ranking	FIBA Zone Ranking
Australia	Host nation	26 March 2020	2018	16	15	Champions (2006)	3	1
Canada	Qualifying Tournament	5 February 2022	2018	12	5	Third place (1979, 1986)	4	2
Japan	Qualifying Tournament	5 February 2022	2018	9	4	Runners-up (1975)	8	3
France	Qualifying Tournament	11 February 2022	2018	11	6	Third place (1953)	6	3
Serbia	Qualifying Tournament	12 February 2022	2014	3	1	Eighth place (2014)	10	5
Mali	Replacement	2 June 2022	2010	2	1	15th place (2010)	37	3

== Standings ==
Pos	Team	Pld	W	L	PF	PA	PD	Pts	Qualification
1	Australia (H)	5	4	1	390	308	+82	9 (Note: Australia 75–72 Canada)	Final round
2	Canada	5	4	1	356	301	+55	9	Final round
3	Serbia	5	3	2	332	330	+2	8 (Note: Serbia 68–62 France)	Final round
4	France	5	3	2	318	296	+22	8	Final round
5	Japan	5	1	4	316	333	−17	6	
6	Mali	5	0	5	306	450	−144	5	

Source: FIBA
Rules for classification: 1) Points; 2) Head-to-head results; 3) Points difference; 4) Points scored.
(H) Hosts

== Games ==
All times are local (UTC+10).

=== Canada vs Serbia ===
22 September 2022
13:00

Boxscore

Canada	67–60	Serbia
Scoring by quarter: 15–16, 23–12, 16–13, 13–19
Pts: Alexander 13; Rebs: Achonwa 8 Asts: Nurse 3		Pts: Anderson 18; Rebs: Krajišnik 8 Asts: Anderson 3

State Sports Centre, Sydney
Attendance: 1,248
Referees: Amy Bonner (USA), Maj Forsberg (DEN), Viola Györgyi (ROU)

=== Japan vs Mali ===
22 September 2022
14:00

Boxscore

Japan	89–56	Mali
Scoring by quarter: 21–18, 26–11, 19–15, 23–12
Pts: Hirashita 17; Rebs: Tokashiki 7 Asts: Miyazaki 6		Pts: N'Diaye 13; Rebs: Koné 14; Asts: Koné 4

Sydney SuperDome, Sydney
Attendance: 2,490
Referees: Gatis Saliņš (LAT), Sara El-Sharnouby (EGY), Ryan Jones (NZL)

=== Australia vs France ===
22 September 2022
20:30

Boxscore

Australia	57–70	France
Scoring by quarter: 17–18, 14–14, 16–20, 10–18
Pts: Allen 16; Rebs: three players 7 Asts: four players 2		Pts: Williams 23; Rebs: Michel 8 Asts: Fauthoux 6

Sydney SuperDome, Sydney
Attendance: 9,291
Referees: Julio Anaya (PAN), Blanca Burns (USA), Johnny Batista (PUR)

=== Serbia vs Japan ===
23 September 2022
12:00

Boxscore

Serbia	69–64	Japan
Scoring by quarter: 24–9, 14–25, 16–12, 15–18
Pts: Nogić 13; Rebs: Nogić 9 Asts: Anderson 8		Pts: Takada 15; Rebs: Akaho 7 Asts: Miyazaki 6

Sydney SuperDome, Sydney
Attendance: 583
Referees: Andreia Silva (BRA), Martin Vulić (CRO), Yasmina Alcaraz (ESP)

=== France vs Canada ===
23 September 2022
18:00

Boxscore

France	45–59	Canada
Scoring by quarter: 9–15, 8–14, 13–16, 15–14
Pts: Williams 13; Rebs: Williams 8 Asts: Michel, Rupert 3		Pts: Fields 17; Rebs: Alexander 14; Asts: Alexander, Colley 3

Sydney SuperDome, Sydney
Attendance: 1,763
Referees: Gatis Saliņš (LAT), Wojciech Liszka (POL), Johnny Batista (PUR)

=== Mali vs Australia ===
23 September 2022
20:30

Boxscore

Mali	58–118	Australia
Scoring by quarter: 12–23, 10–33, 23–36, 13–26
Pts: N'Diaye 15; Rebs: Koné 6 Asts: Koné 5		Pts: Magbegor 15; Rebs: Blicavs 8 Asts: Madgen, Talbot 5

Sydney SuperDome, Sydney
Attendance: 3,563
Referees: Amy Bonner (USA), Blanca Burns (USA), Yana Nikogossyan (KAZ)

=== Mali vs France ===
25 September 2022
14:30

Boxscore

Mali	59–74	France
Scoring by quarter: 21–17, 11–25, 14–15, 13–17
Pts: Koné 18; Rebs: Koné 18; Asts: Haidara 3		Pts: Williams 14; Rebs: Williams 7 Asts: Williams 6

Sydney SuperDome, Sydney
Attendance: 683
Referees: Wojciech Liszka (POL), Ryan Jones (NZL), Joyce Muchenu (ZIM)

=== Australia vs Serbia ===
25 September 2022
18:00

Boxscore

Australia	69–54	Serbia
Scoring by quarter: 18–10, 18–18, 17–15, 16–11
Pts: Allen 16; Rebs: George 7 Asts: Tolo 5		Pts: Anderson 16; Rebs: Anderson 7 Asts: Anderson 6

Sydney SuperDome, Sydney
Attendance: 9,329
Referees: Maj Forsberg (DEN), Andreia Silva (BRA), Johnny Batista (PUR)

=== Japan vs Canada ===
25 September 2022
20:30

Boxscore

Japan	56–70	Canada
Scoring by quarter: 12–20, 13–21, 14–20, 17–9
Pts: Takada 11; Rebs: Akaho 6 Asts: Miyazaki, Yasuma 5		Pts: Carleton 19; Rebs: Alexander 11; Asts: Amihere 5

Sydney SuperDome, Sydney
Attendance: 4,781
Referees: Amy Bonner (USA), Gatis Saliņš (LAT), Blanca Burns (USA)

=== Serbia vs Mali ===
26 September 2022
13:30

Boxscore

Serbia	81–68	Mali
Scoring by quarter: 25–25, 18–14, 19–11, 19–18
Pts: Čađo 20; Rebs: Krajišnik 12; Asts: Anderson 9		Pts: Koné 13; Rebs: Koné 11; Asts: Dembélé 3

State Sports Centre, Sydney
Attendance: 247
Referees: Yu Jung (TPE), Özlem Yalman (TUR), Johnny Batista (PUR)

=== France vs Japan ===
26 September 2022
16:00

Boxscore

France	67–53	Japan
Scoring by quarter: 16–5, 13–21, 19–18, 19–9
Pts: Williams 16; Rebs: Rupert 12; Asts: Fauthoux 8		Pts: Miyazaki 13; Rebs: Takada 9 Asts: Miyazaki 4

State Sports Centre, Sydney
Attendance: 429
Referees: Amy Bonner (USA), Gatis Saliņš (LAT), Andreia Silva (BRA)

=== Canada vs Australia ===
26 September 2022
20:30

Boxscore

Canada	72–75	Australia
Scoring by quarter: 23–14, 10–24, 24–13, 15–24
Pts: Fields 17; Rebs: Alexander 11; Asts: Fields 3		Pts: Magbegor 16; Rebs: Talbot 9 Asts: Talbot 8

Sydney SuperDome, Sydney
Attendance: 6,801
Referees: Julio Anaya (PAN), Wojciech Liszka (POL), Blanca Burns (USA)

=== Mali vs Canada ===
27 September 2022
16:00

Boxscore

Mali	65–88	Canada
Scoring by quarter: 16–33, 13–20, 17–17, 19–18
Pts: Dembélé, N'Diaye 12; Rebs: Koné 10; Asts: Haidara, N'Diaye 3		Pts: Carleton 27; Rebs: Alexander 14; Asts: three players 4

State Sports Centre, Sydney
Attendance: 1,359
Referees: Maj Forsberg (DEN), Ryan Jones (NZL), Ariadna Chueca (ESP)

=== Serbia vs France ===
27 September 2022
17:30

Boxscore

Serbia	68–62	France
Scoring by quarter: 24–17, 13–15, 16–14, 15–16
Pts: Anderson 18; Rebs: Krajišnik 13; Asts: Anderson 6		Pts: Chartereau 16; Rebs: Williams 5 Asts: three players 4

Sydney SuperDome, Sydney
Attendance: 2,862
Referees: Amy Bonner (USA), Johnny Batista (PUR), Blanca Burns (USA)

=== Australia vs Japan ===
27 September 2022
20:30

Boxscore

Australia	71–54	Japan
Scoring by quarter: 16–18, 20–16, 20–9, 15–11
Pts: Whitcomb 15; Rebs: George 9 Asts: Madgen 6		Pts: Okoye 14; Rebs: Tokashiki 7 Asts: Miyazaki 5

Sydney SuperDome, Sydney
Attendance: 5,923
Referees: Julio Anaya (PAN), Martin Vulić (CRO), Yasmina Alcaraz (ESP)
