= Marine Johannès =

French basketball player (born 1995)

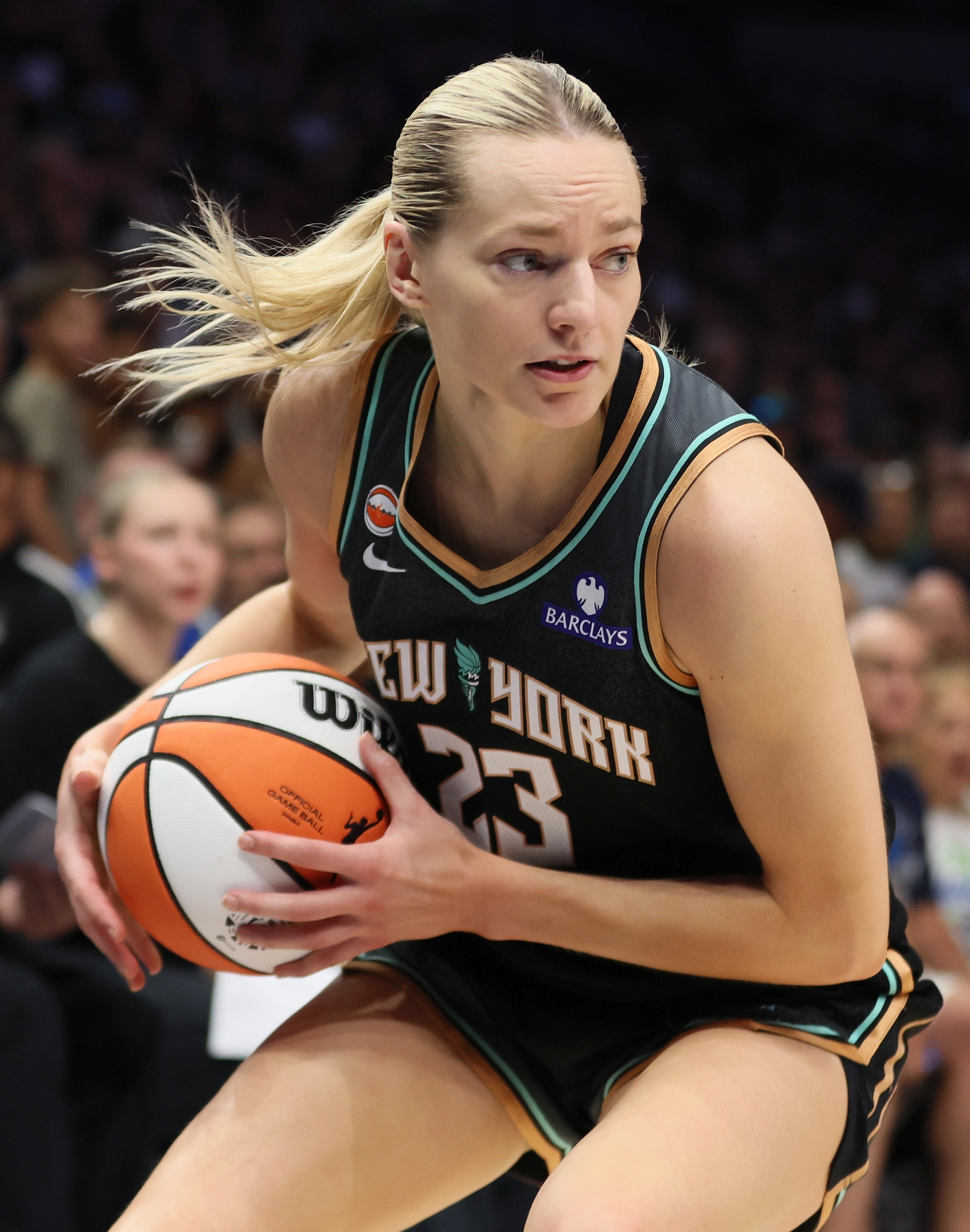
- Johannès with the New York Liberty in 2026

No. 23 – New York Liberty
- Position: Guard
- League: WNBA

Personal information
- Born: 21 January 1995 (age 31) Lisieux, France
- Listed height: 5 ft 10 in (1.78 m)
- Listed weight: 134 lb (61 kg)

Career information
- WNBA draft: 2017: undrafted
- Playing career: 2011–present

Career history
- 2011–2016: USO Mondeville
- 2016–2019: Bourges
- 2019: New York Liberty
- 2019–2024: ASVEL
- 2022–2023: New York Liberty
- 2024–2025: Çukurova Basketbol
- 2025–present: New York Liberty
- 2025–2026: Galatasaray

Career highlights
- 2× WNBA Commissioner's Cup champion (2023, 2026); EuroCup Women champion (2023); EuroCup Women Finals MVP (2023)
- Stats at Basketball Reference
Medals
Women's basketball
Representing (France) France
Olympic Games
| Silver medal – second place | 2024 Paris | Team |
| Bronze medal – third place | 2020 Tokyo | Team |
FIBA World Cup
| Silver medal – second place | 2026 Germany |
EuroBasket
| Silver medal – second place | 2017 Czech Republic |
| Silver medal – second place | 2019 Serbia/Latvia |
| Silver medal – second place | 2021 Spain/France |

Marine Murielle Mégane Johannès (born 21 January 1995) is a French professional basketball player for the New York Liberty of the Women's National Basketball Association (WNBA) and for the Laces of Unrivaled. A native of Lisieux in Calvados, she also plays for the French national team, with whom she participated in the 2016, 2020, and 2024 Summer Olympics. She is nicknamed "the Wizard" for her creative playing style and passing and shooting skills.

== Professional career ==
=== Early career ===
Marine Johannès started playing basketball at the age of 8 after accompanying her sister to watch a practice and gaining interest in the sport. Her first club, Pont-l'Évêque, had also been home to Nicolas Batum. Johannès' "atypical" style and advanced game stood out among her peers and she was noticed by Batum's former coach Samuel Vallée, who recruited her to join the basketball club USO Mondeville at age 12. With that team, she won the U17 French League twice, in 2011 and 2012, and the U17 French Cup in 2012. Her team also won the Youth French League in 2013.

=== European professional leagues ===
==== Mondeville ====
It was at Mondeville, a team evolving in France's first division, the Ligue Féminine de Basketball (LFB), that she had her first professional experience during the 2011-12 season at 17 years old. She had her breakthrough year during the 2015-16 season, averaging 14.2 points and 4.4 assists in 34 minutes. After that season, she joined Bourges, having her first experience in EuroLeague. She had good individual and team achievements with Bourges, winning the French Cup in 2017, 2018, and 2019; and the French League in 2018. She was named to the All-LFB First Team twice, during the 2017-18 and 2018-19 seasons.

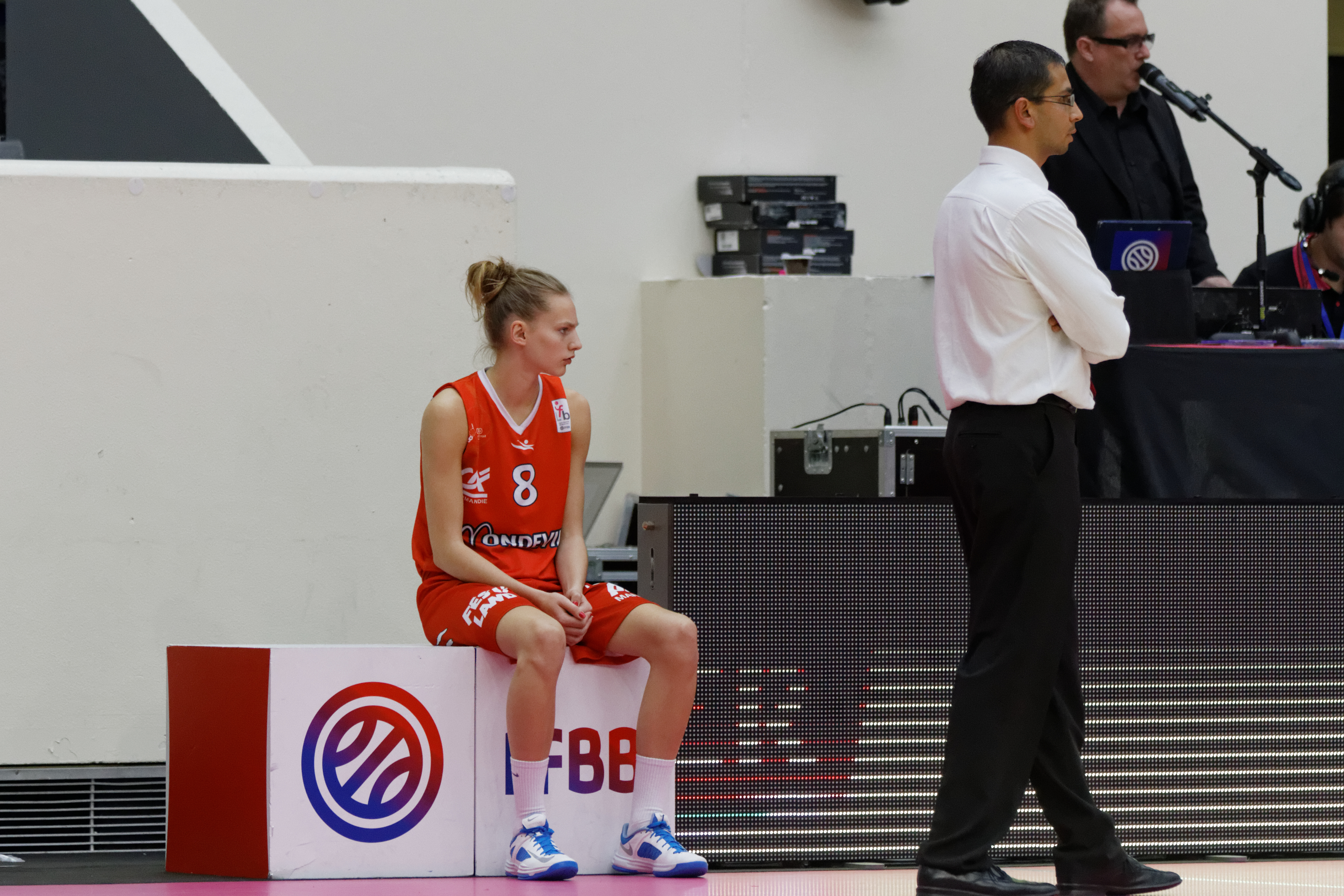
Johannès with Mondeville in 2013

==== Bourges ====
On a European level, Bourges lost in the quarter-finals of EuroLeague each of her three years with the team. During her 2018–19 season, she averaged 15.1 points and 4.7 assists in Euroleague. That season, she was named Best Guard and Most Entertaining Player of the EuroLeague regular season.

==== Lyon ASVEL ====
In 2019, she signed a 3-year contract with the winner of the French League Lyon ASVEL, a club owned by Tony Parker. Her first season was interrupted by COVID while her team was first in the standings. She was also named in the All-Euroleague 2nd team this shortened season. During the 2020-21 season, she had a career high 38 points against USK Praha and was in the All-Euroleague 2nd team again. In the French League, she was named in the First Team for the third time of her career but her team lost in the semi-finals, resulting in them playing the EuroCup and not the EuroLeague the next season, the first time in that competition for Johannès in her career. The 2021-22 season wasn't a big team success for Lyon ASVEL, losing in the quarterfinals of EuroCup against Çukurova Basketbol, ending 3rd of the LFB regular season and losing in the finals against Johannès' previous team Bourges, making them play in Eurocup again the next season. Neither was it a good individual season for Johannès who was for the first time not nominated in the All-LFB First Team since the creation of the award and having her stats going slightly down, including her shooting percentage in LFB going from 49.2% the previous season to 41.8%. The 2022-23 season proved to be much more successful: ASVEL finished first in the regular season standings and won the French LFB domestic league championship in a 2-1 finals win against Villeneuve d'Ascq. The team also defeated Galatasaray S.K. in the EuroCup Finals with an impressive 180-113 aggregate score across two legs to take home their first international championship on April 12, 2023. Johannès was named Finals MVP, averaging 22.5 points, 2.0 rebounds, and 6.0 assists.

==== ÇBK Mersin ====
On May 23, 2024, it was announced that Turkish club ÇBK Mersin had signed Johannès from Lyon. In a game against her former club Bourges on October 29, 2024, Johannès suffered a ligament injury in her left ankle. Mersin announced on November 23 that she had undergone successful surgery and would require 10-12 weeks of recovery time. Johannès returned to play in a Euroleague loss against Valencia on February 19, 2025. Despite playing only 22 games across all competitions due to the injury, Johannès helped her team through the Euroleague Final Six, finally falling 53-66 to USK Praha on April 13. Mersin also advanced to face Fenerbahçe S.K. in the Turkish Women's Basketball Super League (KBSL) finals where they lost to the Turkish giants in the first three games of a best-of-5 series. Her first season in the KBSL saw Johannès averaging 14.9 points, 3.8 rebounds, and 5.3 assists; in Euroleague, she averaged 11.4 points, 2.1 rebounds, and 3.7 assists.

==== Galatasaray ====
On June 27, 2025, she signed with Galatasaray of the Turkish Women's Basketball Super League (KBSL). Johannès won Best Play of the Season at the 2025-26 EuroLeague Women Awards Ceremony for a nutmeg assist made in a game against Sopron. She averaged 8.8 points, 2.0 rebounds, and 2.7 assists in 20.5 minutes during the KBSL regular season and 9.2 points, 3.0 rebounds, and 3.3 assists in Euroleague.

=== WNBA ===
Johannes went undrafted in the 2017 WNBA draft. She was signed in 2019 by the New York Liberty. She averaged 7.2 points in 19 minutes that season. She had a few high scoring games, including back-to-back career highs with a 21-point game against Connecticut followed by 22 against Washington.

In February 2020, it was announced that she signed a multi-year deal with the Liberty. However, because of the COVID pandemic, she opted not to play during the 2020 season and the Liberty suspended her contract for the year. She didn't play the 2021 season either because of overseas commitment, having both the EuroBasket and the Olympic Games to play that summer.

On 8 June 2022, the Liberty announced that she would join the team for the 2022 season. She improved her career high in points by scoring 23 points in a loss against the Seattle Storm on 20 June 2022.

In March 2023, Johannès re-signed with the Liberty.

Johannès did not play in the 2024 WNBA season, focusing on the 2024 Olympic Games.

On 21 March 2025, the Liberty announced that they had re-signed Johannès for the 2025 season.

On 28 April 2026, the Liberty announced that they had re-signed Johannès for the 2026 season. She recorded a new WNBA career-high in points with 25 in a tight 98-93 win over the Washington Mystics on May 10. On May 27, she scored a career-high 7 three-pointers on 77.8% shooting from three in a win against the Phoenix Mercury. Johannès again improved her career-high on August 9 with 27 points off the bench, leading the team to a 111-71 win against the Las Vegas Aces.

=== Unrivaled ===
On June 29, 2026, it was announced that Johannès signed a multiyear deal with Unrivaled, the 3-on-3 basketball league co-founded by her New York Liberty teammate Breanna Stewart.

== National team career ==
Marine Johannès played her first game with the senior French national team on 25 November 2015 against the Netherlands, where she scored 15 points.

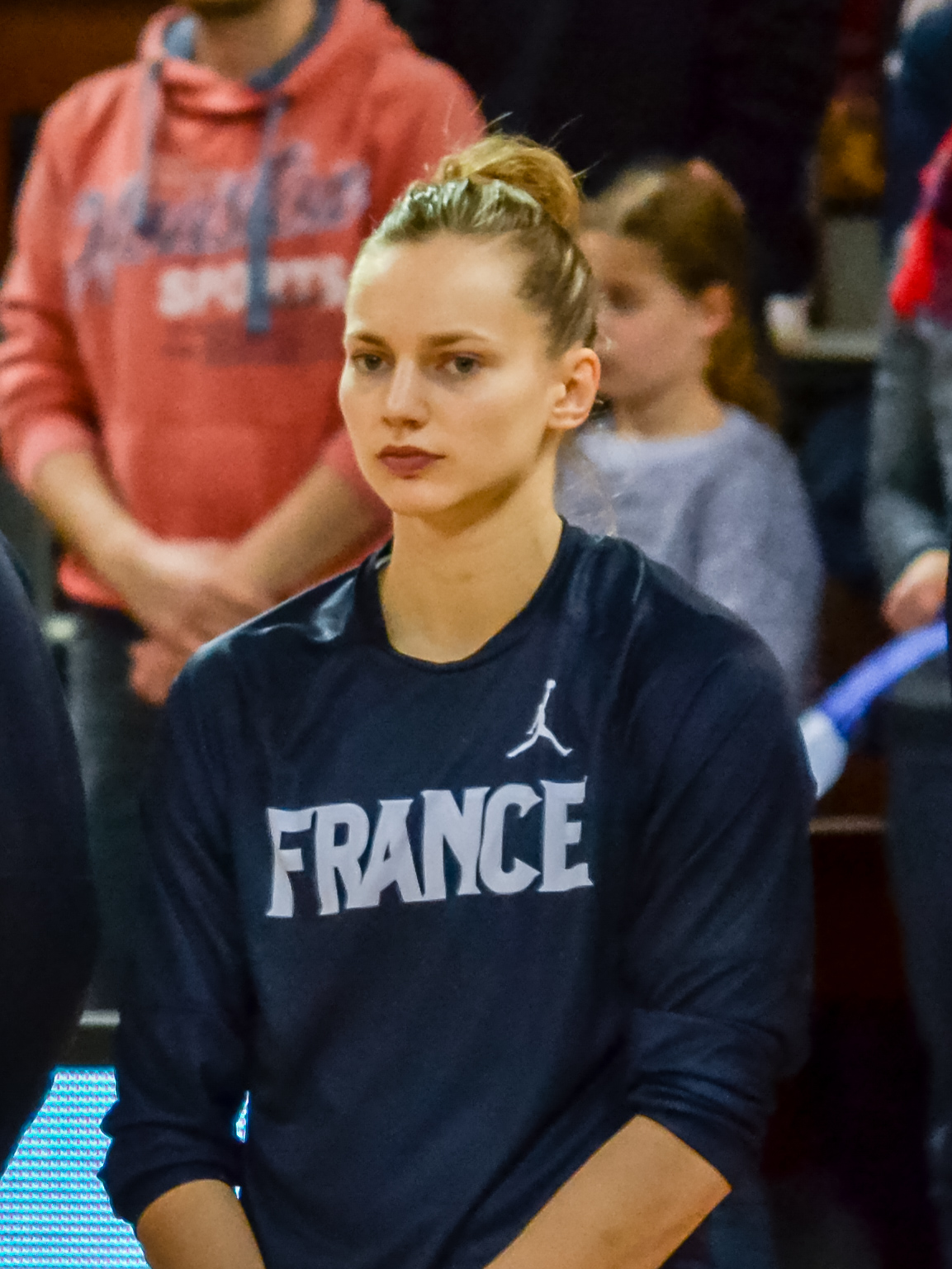
Johannès representing France during Eurobasket qualifiers in 2018

=== Olympics ===
==== Rio 2016 ====
At 21 years old, Johannès was the youngest player on the roster selected to represent France at the 2016 Summer Olympics. Her most memorable game of the tournament came in the semi-finals against the United States, where she recorded 13 points, including a crossover followed by a three-pointer on basketball legend Maya Moore. France lost to Serbia in the bronze medal game, with 3 points on 1/9 shooting from Johannès.

==== Tokyo 2020 (held in 2021) ====
She participated again with the French national team at the 2020 Tokyo Olympics, where France won the bronze medal, defeating Serbia 91-76 in a rematch of the 2016 bronze medal game. Johannès recorded 10 points, 3 rebounds, 3 assists, and 1 block in the victory.

==== Paris 2024 ====
Representing the host nation, Johannès became the only player in the 2024 Paris Olympics to record 5 three-pointers in multiple games and ranked second overall in three-pointers made. Johannès would win the silver medal with France after losing to the United States 67-66 in a closely fought game.

=== EuroBasket ===
Johannès represented France at Eurobasket in the 2017, 2019, and 2021 competitions; all of which resulted in a silver medal.

Ahead of the 2023 tournament, Johannès requested a late arrival to sign her contract with the New York Liberty in the WNBA. Her request was denied and Johannès was not selected to play in 2023 Eurobasket. Backlash against the French Basketball Federation (FFBB) staff and head coach Jean-Aimé Toupane received significant media coverage in France, which included strong messages of support for Johannès from French basketball legends Tony Parker and Nicolas Batum. France would finish with bronze, failing to reach the final for the first time since 2011.

On May 21, 2025, Johannès shared via Instagram her decision not to participate in the 2025 tournament and instead stay with her team in New York. She became the fourth French WNBA player to elect not to play in 2025 Eurobasket, reflecting a wider trend among European players to remain stateside that season.

=== FIBA World Cup ===
In 2018, Johannès was selected to play in her first FIBA World Cup, where the French finished fifth after a 65-86 loss to Belgium.

Johannès made the roster for the 2022 FIBA World Cup and traveled with the team to Sydney, Australia. However, on the eve of France's opening game, she suffered a thigh injury and had to sit out the remainder of the tournament.

On August 24, 2026, it was announced that Johannès was selected to represent France at the 2026 FIBA World Cup in Berlin.

== Career statistics ==
Legend
| GP | Games played | GS | Games started | MPG | Minutes per game | RPG | Rebounds per game |
| APG | Assists per game | SPG | Steals per game | BPG | Blocks per game | PPG | Points per game |
| TO | Turnovers per game | FG% | Field-goal percentage | 3P% | 3-point field-goal percentage | FT% | Free-throw percentage |
| **Bold** | Career best | ° | League leader |

=== WNBA ===
==== Regular season ====
| Year | Team | GP | GS | MPG | FG% | 3P% | FT% | RPG | APG | SPG | BPG | TO | PPG |
|---|---|---|---|---|---|---|---|---|---|---|---|---|---|
| 2019 | New York | 19 | 0 | 18.2 | .436 | .379 | .789 | 1.8 | 2.4 | .4 | .2 | **1.2** | 7.2 |
| 2022 | New York | 24 | 10 | **25.5** | **.464** | **.437** | **.870** | 1.7 | **3.4** | .6 | .1 | 1.8 | **10.0** |
| 2023 | New York | 35 | 5 | 18.9 | .414 | .368 | .750 | 1.4 | 1.7 | .7 | .1 | 1.3 | 7.1 |
| 2025 | New York | **44** | 5 | 18.3 | .423 | .344 | .842 | 1.9 | 1.6 | .6 | **.3** | **1.2** | 6.4 |
| 2026 | New York | 41 | **18** | 20.1 | .406 | .379 | .846 | **2.0** | 2.4 | **.8** | .1 | 1.6 | 8.2 |
| Career | 5 years, 1 team | 163 | 38 | 19.9 | .419 | .378 | .822 | 1.8 | 2.2 | .6 | .2 | 1.4 | 7.6 |

==== Playoffs ====
| Year | Team | GP | GS | MPG | FG% | 3P% | FT% | RPG | APG | SPG | BPG | TO | PPG |
|---|---|---|---|---|---|---|---|---|---|---|---|---|---|
| 2022 | New York | 3 | **1** | **23.0** | **.429** | **.400** | **1.000** | **2.3** | **4.3** | **1.7** | .0 | 2.0 | **5.7** |
| 2023 | New York | **9** | 0 | 11.4 | .276 | .250 | .500 | .7 | .8 | .1 | **.2** | .7 | 2.7 |
| 2025 | New York | 1 | 0 | 10.0 | .000 | .000 | 1.000 | 2.0 | .0 | .0 | .0 | 1.0 | 3.0 |
| 2026 | New York | 5 | 0 | 7.0 | .364 | .250 | 1.000 | .2 | 1.4 | .0 | .0 | **.6** | 2.6 |
| Career | 4 years, 1 team | 18 | 1 | 12.1 | .316 | .273 | .818 | .9 | 1.5 | .3 | .1 | .9 | 3.2 |

== Honors ==
=== As a player ===
- Most Entertaining Player in EuroLeague: season 2018–19
- Best Guard in EuroLeague: season 2018–19
- All-LFB (French League) First Team: seasons 2017–18, 2018–19 and 2020–21
- 2nd All-EuroLeague Team: seasons 2019–20 and 2020–21
- EuroCup Finals Most Valuable Player: season 2022-23

=== As a team ===
==== National team ====
- Bronze Medal at the 2020 Summer Olympics
- Silver Medal at the 2017 EuroBasket (Czech Republic)
- Silver Medal at the 2019 EuroBasket (Serbia/Latvia)
- Silver Medal at the 2021 EuroBasket (Spain/France)
- Silver Medal at the 2024 Summer Olympics

==== Club ====
- 3x French Cup champion: 2017, 2018 and 2019
- 2x French League champion: 2018, 2023
- French League finalist: 2022
- EuroCup champion: 2023
- 2x WNBA Commissioner's Cup champion: 2023, 2026
- Turkish Cup champion: 2025

== Personal life ==
As of 2026, Johannès is in a relationship with Golden State Valkyries forward and France teammate Gabby Williams, who has been described as her "longtime partner";
