= 2022 FIBA Women's Basketball World Cup Qualifying Tournament =

Basketball event

The 2022 FIBA Women's Basketball World Cup Qualifying Tournament determined the last ten teams for the 2022 FIBA Women's Basketball World Cup. It was held from 10 to 14 February 2022.

== Format ==
Sixteen teams, qualified from their respective continental championships, were divided into four groups of four teams each. The top three teams from each group qualified for the final tournament. Two already qualified teams, hosts Australia, and the 2020 Olympic gold medalists United States, participated in this tournament as well, therefore two teams qualified in the groups containing these teams.

== Qualified teams ==
Qualification	Host	Dates	Vacancies	Qualified
2021 FIBA Women's AmeriCup	(Puerto Rico) San Juan	11–19 June 2021	4	United States; Puerto Rico; Brazil; Canada
EuroBasket Women 2021	(France) Strasbourg (Spain) Valencia	17−27 June 2021	6	Serbia; France; Belgium; ~~Belarus~~; Bosnia and Herzegovina; Russia
2021 Women's Afrobasket	(Cameroon) Yaoundé	17–26 September 2021	2	Nigeria; Mali
2021 FIBA Women's Asia Cup	(Jordan) Amman	27 September–3 October 2021	4	Japan; China; Australia; South Korea
Total			16	

== Draw ==
The draw for the qualifying tournament took place on 23 November 2021.

On 18 November 2021, it was announced that Belgrade would host two tournaments, while Osaka and Washington hosted the other tournaments.

=== Seeding ===
The seeding was based on the FIBA Women's World Ranking of August 9, 2021.

Seed 1
Team	Pos
United States	1
Australia	3
Canada	4
France	5

Seed 2
Team	Pos
Belgium	6
China	7
Japan	8
Serbia	9

Seed 3
Team	Pos
~~Belarus~~	11
Russia	12
Brazil	14
Nigeria	16

Seed 4
Team	Pos
Puerto Rico	17
South Korea	19
Bosnia and Herzegovina	27
Mali	41

== Tournaments ==
Group A and B were played in Belgrade, Serbia, Group C in Osaka, Japan and Group D in Washington, United States.

=== Tournament A ===
Pos	Team	Pld	W	L	PF	PA	PD	Pts	Qualification
1	Serbia (H)	3	3	0	219	203	+16	6	Final tournament
2	Australia (Note: Australia is already qualified as the Final tournament host.)	3	2	1	215	191	+24	5	Final tournament
3	South Korea	3	1	2	199	218	−19	4	Final tournament
4	Brazil	3	0	3	196	217	−21	3	

Source: FIBA
Rules for classification: 1) Points; 2) Head-to-head; 3) Points difference; 4) Points scored.
(H) Hosts
Notes:

All times are local (UTC+1).

10 February 2022
12:00

Boxscore

Australia	65–52	Brazil
Scoring by quarter: 20–10, 16–10, 17–16, 12–16
Pts: Allen 16; Rebs: George 8 Asts: Talbot, Whitcomb 4		Pts: De Carvalho 13; Rebs: De Souza 9 Asts: Gonçalo 4

Ranko Žeravica Sports Hall, Belgrade
Attendance: 15
Referees: Boris Krejić (SLO), Felipe Ibarra (CHI), Andrada Csender (ROU)

10 February 2022
21:00

Boxscore

South Korea	62–65	Serbia
Scoring by quarter: 15–13, 15–22, 16–19, 16–11
Pts: Kim 16; Rebs: Park Ji-s. 12; Asts: Park H. 4		Pts: Anderson, Nogić 13; Rebs: Stanković 10; Asts: Anderson 7

Ranko Žeravica Sports Hall, Belgrade
Attendance: 1,200
Referees: Mihkel Männiste (EST), Johnny Batista (PUR), Saber Rezgui (TUN)

12 February 2022
18:00

Boxscore

Brazil	74–76	South Korea
Scoring by quarter: 16–17, 14–16, 16–12, 28–31
Pts: De Carvalho 13; Rebs: Cardoso 10; Asts: Paixão 8		Pts: Kang 21; Rebs: Park Ji-s. 13; Asts: Kim 10

Ranko Žeravica Sports Hall, Belgrade
Attendance: 150
Referees: Johnny Batista (PUR), Özlem Yalman (TUR), Mihkel Männiste (EST)

12 February 2022
21:00

Boxscore

Serbia	78–71	Australia
Scoring by quarter: 24–20, 14–20, 15–16, 25–15
Pts: Anderson 30; Rebs: Krajišnik 6 Asts: Crvendakić, Škorić 4		Pts: Whitcomb 18; Rebs: Allen 8 Asts: Allen, Whitcomb 6

Ranko Žeravica Sports Hall, Belgrade
Attendance: 1,500
Referees: Michał Proć (POL), Kerem Baki (TUR), Yu Yijing (CHN)

13 February 2022
15:00

Boxscore

Australia	79–61	South Korea
Scoring by quarter: 25–10, 26–10, 14–21, 14–20
Pts: George 15; Rebs: Garbin 9 Asts: George, Wallace 5		Pts: Jin 18; Rebs: Jin 7 Asts: Heo 7

Ranko Žeravica Sports Hall, Belgrade
Attendance: 100
Referees: Boris Krejić (SLO), Felipe Ibarra (CHI), Sara El-Sharnouby (EGY)

13 February 2022
21:00

Boxscore

Serbia	76–70	Brazil
Scoring by quarter: 17–16, 22–17, 18–24, 19–13
Pts: Anderson 25; Rebs: Krajišnik 6 Asts: Anderson 6		Pts: De Carvalho 18; Rebs: Cardoso 13; Asts: Paixão 7

Ranko Žeravica Sports Hall, Belgrade
Attendance: 570
Referees: Michał Proć (POL), Hortencia Sánchez (MEX), Saber Rezgui (TUN)

=== Tournament B ===
Pos	Team	Pld	W	L	PF	PA	PD	Pts	Qualification
1	China	3	3	0	277	210	+67	6	Final tournament
2	Nigeria (Note: Nigeria withdrew their team in June 2022 and was replaced by Mali.)	3	2	1	216	224	−8	5	Qualified, later withdrew
3	France	3	1	2	212	236	−24	4	Final tournament
4	Mali	3	0	3	199	234	−35	3	Final tournament

Source: FIBA
Rules for classification: 1) Points; 2) Head-to-head; 3) Points difference; 4) Points scored.
Notes:

All times are local (UTC+1).

10 February 2022
15:00

Boxscore

China	90–76	Nigeria
Scoring by quarter: 29–14, 25–22, 25–16, 11–24
Pts: Li M., Li Yue. 19; Rebs: Li Yue. 6 Asts: Li Yua., Wang S. 7		Pts: Okonkwo 15; Rebs: four players 4 Asts: Chidom, Elonu 4

Ranko Žeravica Sports Hall, Belgrade
Attendance: 100
Referees: Kerem Baki (TUR), Hortencia Sánchez (MEX), Yana Nikogossyan (KAZ)

10 February 2022
18:00

Boxscore

France	77–66	Mali
Scoring by quarter: 23–18, 21–17, 14–12, 19–19
Pts: Touré 14; Rebs: Époupa, Williams 5 Asts: three players 3		Pts: Koné 26; Rebs: Koné 9 Asts: Gandega 6

Ranko Žeravica Sports Hall, Belgrade
Attendance: 150
Referees: Michał Proć (POL), Kristian Páez (ECU), Sara El-Sharnouby (EGY)

11 February 2022
15:00

Boxscore

Mali	64–84	China
Scoring by quarter: 10–22, 24–21, 13–27, 17–14
Pts: A. Coulibaly 15; Rebs: Koné 9 Asts: N'Diaye 5		Pts: Li Yue. 21; Rebs: Huang 14; Asts: Huang 8

Ranko Žeravica Sports Hall, Belgrade
Attendance: 150
Referees: Boris Krejić (SLO), Andrada Csender (ROU), Jean Ruhamiriza (RWA)

11 February 2022
18:00

Boxscore

Nigeria	67–65	France
Scoring by quarter: 11–28, 16–10, 21–14, 19–13
Pts: Macaulay 19; Rebs: Chidom 6 Asts: Amukamara, Chidom 5		Pts: Johannès 18; Rebs: Ciak 7 Asts: Époupa, Fauthoux 4

Ranko Žeravica Sports Hall, Belgrade
Attendance: 50
Referees: Felipe Ibarra (CHI), Hortencia Sánchez (MEX), Özlem Yalman (TUR)

13 February 2022
12:00

Boxscore

Nigeria	73–69	Mali
Scoring by quarter: 20–22, 22–13, 22–9, 9–25
Pts: Okonkwo 14; Rebs: Enabosi, Nyingifa 8 Asts: Amukamara 8		Pts: N'Diaye 16; Rebs: Koné 13; Asts: K. Coulibaly, Gandega 5

Ranko Žeravica Sports Hall, Belgrade
Attendance: 30
Referees: Kerem Baki (TUR), Johnny Batista (PUR), Mihkel Männiste (EST)

13 February 2022
18:00

Boxscore

France	70–103	China
Scoring by quarter: 19–32, 21–22, 16–24, 14–25
Pts: Johannès 16; Rebs: Williams 8 Asts: Johannès 5		Pts: Huang 30; Rebs: Wang S. 8 Asts: Wang S. 15

Ranko Žeravica Sports Hall, Belgrade
Attendance: 70
Referees: Kristian Páez (ECU), Andrada Csender (ROU), Jean Ruhamiriza (RWA)

=== Tournament C ===
Pos	Team	Pld	W	L	PF	PA	PD	Pts	Qualification
1	Canada	2	1	1	175	150	+25	3	Final tournament
2	Japan (H)	2	1	1	168	166	+2	3	Final tournament
3	Bosnia and Herzegovina	2	1	1	151	178	−27	3	Final tournament
4	Belarus (Note: Belarus withdrew before the tournament, due to several positive COVID-19 tests in their team.)	0	0	0	0	0	0	0	Withdrew

Source: FIBA
Rules for classification: 1) Points; 2) Head-to-head; 3) Points difference; 4) Points scored.
(H) Hosts
Notes:

All times are local (UTC+9).

10 February 2022
19:00

Boxscore

Japan	86–79 (OT)	Canada
Scoring by quarter: 15–17, 8–23, 23–14, 27–19, Overtime: 13–6
Pts: Mawuli 18; Rebs: Tokashiki 8 Asts: three players 5		Pts: Fields 19; Rebs: Achonwa 10; Asts: Colley 5

Ookini Arena Maishima, Osaka
Attendance: 1,282
Referees: Beker Scott (AUS), Jelena Smiljanić (SRB), Gatis Saliņš (LAT)

12 February 2022
15:00

Boxscore

Canada	96–64	Bosnia and Herzegovina
Scoring by quarter: 30–19, 27–17, 19–16, 20–12
Pts: Carleton 28; Rebs: Achonwa 8 Asts: Achonwa 6		Pts: Babić 16; Rebs: Džebo 6 Asts: Džebo, Jones 5

Ookini Arena Maishima, Osaka
Attendance: 138
Referees: Yu Jung (TPE), Andreia Silva (BRA), Viola Györgyi (NOR)

13 February 2022
18:00

Boxscore

Bosnia and Herzegovina	87–82	Japan
Scoring by quarter: 20–23, 18–23, 26–24, 23–12
Pts: Jones 36; Rebs: Jones 23; Asts: Delić 6		Pts: Hayashi 21; Rebs: Akaho, Mawuli 7 Asts: Miyazaki 6

Ookini Arena Maishima, Osaka
Attendance: 1,871
Referees: Gatis Saliņš (LAT), Alexis Mercado (PUR), Saif Al-Dossari (QAT)

=== Tournament D ===
Pos	Team	Pld	W	L	PF	PA	PD	Pts	Qualification
1	United States (Note: The United States had already qualified as the 2020 Olympic gold medalists.) (H)	2	2	0	177	130	+47	5 (Note: Belgium 75–84 United States)	Final tournament
2	Belgium	3	2	1	239	192	+47	5	Final tournament
3	Russia (Note: Russia could not travel to the United States because the U.S. does not consider the country's COVID-19 vaccine to meet its entry requirements. FIBA decided to play the games involving Russia in the Dominican Republic and cancel Russia vs. the United States game. Both teams were awarded one point. However, On 1 March 2022, Russia was expelled from the tournament by FIBA due to its invasion of Ukraine and Puerto Rico was named as their replacement in 18 May 2022.)	2	1	1	145	134	+11	4	Qualified, later disqualified
4	Puerto Rico	3	0	3	188	293	−105	3	Final tournament

Source: FIBA
Rules for classification: 1) Points; 2) Head-to-head; 3) Points difference; 4) Points scored.
(H) Hosts
Notes:

Time in Washington are (UTC−5) and times in Santo Domingo are (UTC−4).

10 February 2022
16:30

Boxscore

Puerto Rico	65–98	Belgium
Scoring by quarter: 23–30, 14–25, 16–16, 12–27
Pts: Guirantes 25; Rebs: Guirantes 5 Asts: Quiñones 2		Pts: Linskens 26; Rebs: Linskens 10; Asts: Delaere, Meesseman 7

Entertainment and Sports Arena, Washington, D.C.
Attendance: 350
Referees: Julio Anaya (PAN), Ariadna Chueca (ESP), Waseem Husainy (CAN)

11 February 2022
18:30

Boxscore

Belgium	75–84	United States
Scoring by quarter: 15–15, 11–23, 18–25, 31–21
Pts: Abdelkader 17; Rebs: Meesseman 10; Asts: Allemand 6		Pts: Plum 16; Rebs: Jones 6 Asts: Gray 8

Entertainment and Sports Arena, Washington, D.C.
Attendance: 1,000
Referees: Martin Vulić (CRO), Yasmina Alcaraz (ESP), Amel Dahra (FRA)

12 February 2022
16:30

Boxscore

United States	93–55	Puerto Rico
Scoring by quarter: 33–8, 16–19, 24–17, 20–11
Pts: Atkins 14; Rebs: Howard 8 Asts: Gray, Plum 5		Pts: Quiñones 12; Rebs: Guirantes 7 Asts: Guirantes 7

Entertainment and Sports Arena, Washington, D.C.
Attendance: 900
Referees: Martin Vulić (CRO), Ariadna Chueca (ESP), Waseem Husainy (CAN)

13 February 2022
16:30

Boxscore

Russia	43–66	Belgium
Scoring by quarter: 12–22, 15–19, 9–12, 7–13
Pts: Frolkina 10; Rebs: four players 4 Asts: Goldyreva, Levchenko 3		Pts: Meesseman 20; Rebs: three players 6 Asts: Allemand 6

Palacio de los Deportes Virgilio Travieso Soto, Santo Domingo, Dominican Republic
Attendance: 500
Referees: Julio Anaya (PAN), Esperanza Mendoza (ESP), Amel Dahra (FRA)

14 February 2022
19:00

Boxscore

Puerto Rico	68–102	Russia
Scoring by quarter: 11–22, 22–20, 12–31, 23–29
Pts: Gwathmey 27; Rebs: Gwathmey 9 Asts: O'Neill 6		Pts: Musina 20; Rebs: Musina 17; Asts: Glonti, Komarova 7

Palacio de los Deportes Virgilio Travieso Soto, Santo Domingo, Dominican Republic
Attendance: 500
Referees: Julio Anaya (PAN), Esperanza Mendoza (ESP), Yasmina Alcaraz (ESP)
