= Xu Limin =

Chinese basketball coach

Xu Limin 许利民
Personal information
- Born: 1966 (age 59–60) Fushun, Liaoning, China

Career information
- Playing career: 1986–1997

Career history

Playing
- 1995–1997: Beijing Ducks

Coaching
- 2005–2017: Beijing Ducks Women
- 2009: China Women (assistant)
- 2013–2016: China Women (assistant)
- 2017–2022: China Women
- 2024–2026: Beijing Ducks

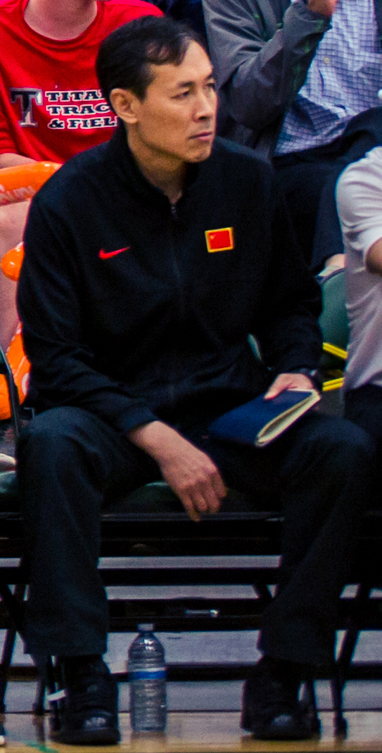

Xu Limin is a Chinese basketball coach of the Chinese national team until 2022, when he was substituted by Zheng Wei.

Xu coached at the 2017 FIBA Women's Asia Cup, and achieved a 5th position at the 2020 Summer Olympics.
