= Isac Mayembo =

French basketball player (born 1999)

Personal information
- Born: January 4, 1999 (age 27) Évry, France
- Listed height: 201 cm (6 ft 7 in)

Career information
- College: Basket club Courneuvien (2015)
- Playing career: 2017–2021
- Position: Power forward

Career history
- 2017–2018: Olympique Antibes
- 2018–2019: Olympique Antibes
- 2019–2020: La Charité Basket 58
- 2020–2021: Entente Cergy Osny Pontoise Basket Ball

Isac Mayembo (born January 4, 1999, Évry), also known as Alex Hitchens, is a French basketball player and social media personality.

After a short professional sports career, he decided to stop and take up social networking. In content posted on YouTube, Instagram and TikTok, he presents himself as a seduction coach and sells online training courses. However, his videos are the subject of recurring controversy due to his masculinist views.

== Early life ==
Of Congolese origin, Isac Mayembo was born in Evry on January 4, 1999.

He started playing basketball "late", at the age of 15.

== Sport career ==
On September 10, 2018, Mayembo signs with Antibes. He starts with the Antibes Sharks Espoirs before joining the professional squad during the sports season.

In 2019, he is one of 15 players called up by Jean-Aimé Toupane for the French U20 team at INSEP for the first training camp in preparation for the European Championship in Tel Aviv from July 13 to 21, 2019.

In 2019, he is loaned out by Antibes to the Nationale 1 club. His first real professional experience came at La Charité Basket 58.

In 2020, he signed at Entente Cergy Osny Pontoise Basket Ball.

On July 29, 2021, he was declared a free agent.

== Online presence ==
He is known on social networks under the pseudonym Alex Hitchens, the name of a fictional character played by Will Smith in the film Hitch.

He presents himself as a seduction coach and sells online training courses.

His videos on YouTube, Instagram and TikTok have come in for recurrent criticism, however, due to his masculinist rhetoric, in which he advocates physical violence against women, as well as for certain passages in which he kisses women in the street without their consent.

=== TikTok Commission Inquiry ===
On June 10, 2025, he was one of five content creators interviewed by the French parliamentary commission investigating TikTok, which had been identified as the most problematic in a large-scale citizen consultation.

Present by videoconference, he asserted during the hearing (which initially lasted 45 minutes) that "Tiktok must be banned because this platform is harmful". What works best," he adds, "is content that offends. [...] The cashier it is, the clearer it is, the better it works".

About 20 minutes into the hearing, the committee chairman asked him about a video in which he questioned the presence of women in the street after 10pm. He then became annoyed and left the call, declaring that his remarks had been taken out of context.
