= 2022 FIBA Women's Basketball World Cup =

International basketball competition

Tournament details
- Host country: Australia
- City: Sydney
- Dates: 22 September – 1 October
- Teams: 12
- Venues: 2 (in 1 host city)

Final positions
- Champions: United States (11th title)
- Runners-up: China
- Third place: Australia
- Fourth place: Canada

Tournament statistics
- Games played: 38
- Attendance: 145,519 (3,829 per game)
- MVP: (United States) A'ja Wilson
- Top scorer: (Puerto Rico) Arella Guirantes (18.2 points per game)

The 2022 FIBA Women's Basketball World Cup, the 19th edition of the FIBA Women's World Championship, was held in Sydney, Australia, between 22 September and 1 October 2022.

The United States were the three-time defending champion, and retained the title after a finals win over China in front of 15,895 spectators. The hosts Australia captured the bronze medal with a win against Canada.

The tournament broke the record for spectators, with 145,519 people attending in total.

== Hosts selection ==
Australia and Russia were the only two federations bidding for the tournament. The decision was made on 26 March 2020 during a video conference.

== Venues ==
The tournament was played at two venues inside the Sydney Olympic Park.

Sydney		2022 FIBA Women's Basketball World Cup is located in Australia
Sydney SuperDome	State Sports Centre	2022 FIBA Women's Basketball World Cup is located in Australia
Capacity: 21,032	Capacity: 5,006	2022 FIBA Women's Basketball World Cup is located in Australia

== Qualification ==
Australia as the hosts automatically qualified for the tournament in March 2020. All other teams qualified through qualifying tournaments, after finishing as the top teams during their regional tournament. A total of 12 teams played in those tournaments for the remaining spots.

The shown FIBA ranking indicates the ranking before the tournament.

On 1 March 2022, Russia was disqualified after being suspended by FIBA due to the invasion of Ukraine, with Puerto Rico being awarded the first wildcard as their replacement on 18 May.

Nigeria were forced to withdraw in June 2022 due to the political situation in the country, and were replaced by Mali (the runners-up at the African Championship).

Qualification	Hosts	Date(s)	Spot(s)	Qualifier(s)
Host nation	N/A	26 March 2020	1	Australia
2020 Summer Olympics	(Japan) Tokyo	26 July – 8 August 2021	1	United States
Qualifying Tournament	(Serbia) Belgrade	10–13 February 2022	2	Serbia; South Korea
Qualifying Tournament	(Serbia) Belgrade	10–13 February 2022	3	China; ~~Nigeria~~; France; Mali
Qualifying Tournament	(Japan) Osaka	10–13 February 2022	3	Canada; Japan; Bosnia and Herzegovina
Qualifying Tournament	(United States) Washington, D.C.	10–13 February 2022	2	Belgium; ~~Russia~~; Puerto Rico

=== Qualified teams ===
Team	Qualification		Appearance			Best Performance	FIBA World Ranking	FIBA Zone Ranking
Team	Method	Date	Last	Total	Streak	Best Performance	FIBA World Ranking	FIBA Zone Ranking
Australia	Host nation	26 March 2020	2018	16	15	Champions (2006)	3	1
United States	Olympic champions	8 August 2021	2018	18	16	Champions (1953, 1957, 1979, 1986, 1990, 1998, 2002, 2010, 2014, 2018)	1	1
Bosnia and Herzegovina	Qualifying Tournament	5 February 2022	Debut				26	17
Canada	Qualifying Tournament	5 February 2022	2018	12	5	Third place (1979, 1986)	4	2
Japan	Qualifying Tournament	5 February 2022	2018	9	4	Runners-up (1975)	8	3
China	Qualifying Tournament	11 February 2022	2018	11	11	Runners-up (1994)	7	2
France	Qualifying Tournament	11 February 2022	2018	11	6	Third place (1953)	6	3
South Korea	Qualifying Tournament	12 February 2022	2018	19	19	Runners-up (1967, 1979)	13	4
Serbia	Qualifying Tournament	12 February 2022	2014	3	1	Eighth place (2014)	10	5
~~Nigeria~~	Qualifying Tournament	13 February 2022	2018	3	2	Eighth place (2018)	14	1
Belgium	Qualifying Tournament	13 February 2022	2018	2	2	Fourth place (2018)	5	2
~~Russia~~	Qualifying Tournament	14 February 2022	2010	5	1	Runners-up (1998, 2002, 2006)	12	7
Puerto Rico	Wildcards	18 May 2022	2018	2	2	16th place (2018)	17	4
Mali	Wildcards	2 June 2022	2010	2	1	15th place (2010)	37	3

== Draw ==
The official draw ceremony took place on 3 March 2022 in Sydney.

Pot 1
Team	Pos
United States	1
Australia	3
Canada	4
Belgium	5
France	6
China	7

Pot 2
Team	Pos
Japan	8
Serbia	10
South Korea	13
Nigeria (Note: Nigeria would later withdraw and was replaced by Mali)	14
Puerto Rico (Note: Team not determined at time of draw)	17
Bosnia and Herzegovina	26

== Referees ==
The following 23 referees were selected for the tournament.

- Scott Beker (AUS)
- Christopher Reid (AUS)
- Andreia Silva (BRA)
- Maripier Malo (CAN)
- Yu Jung (TPE)
- Martin Vulić (CRO)
- Maj Forsberg (DEN)
- Sara El-Sharnouby (EGY)
- Daigo Urushima (JPN)
- Yana Nikogossyan (KAZ)
- Gatis Saliņš (LAT)
- Viola Györgyi (HUN)
- Ryan Jones (NZL)
- Julio Anaya (PAN)
- Wojciech Liszka (POL)
- Johnny Batista (PUR)
- Yasmina Alcaraz (ESP)
- Ariadna Chueca (ESP)
- Amir Taboubi (TUN)
- Özlem Yalman (TUR)
- Amy Bonner (USA)
- Blanca Burns (USA)
- Joyce Muchenu (ZIM)

== Squads ==
Each team consisted of twelve players.

== Preliminary round ==
=== Group A ===
Pos	Team	Pld	W	L	PF	PA	PD	Pts	Qualification
1	United States	5	5	0	536	305	+231	10	Final round
2	China	5	4	1	444	287	+157	9	Final round
3	Belgium	5	3	2	364	349	+15	8	Final round
4	Puerto Rico	5	2	3	341	400	−59	7	Final round
5	South Korea	5	1	4	346	494	−148	6	
6	Bosnia and Herzegovina	5	0	5	289	485	−196	5	

Source: FIBA
Rules for classification: 1) Points; 2) Head-to-head results; 3) Points difference; 4) Points scored.

22 September 2022
Bosnia and Herzegovina	58–82	Puerto Rico
United States	87–72	Belgium
South Korea	44–107	China
23 September 2022
Puerto Rico	42–106	United States
Belgium	84–61	South Korea
China	98–51	Bosnia and Herzegovina
24 September 2022
United States	77–63	China
Bosnia and Herzegovina	66–99	South Korea
Puerto Rico	65–68	Belgium
26 September 2022
Belgium	85–55	Bosnia and Herzegovina
South Korea	69–145	United States
China	95–60	Puerto Rico
27 September 2022
Puerto Rico	92–73	South Korea
China	81–55	Belgium
United States	121–59	Bosnia and Herzegovina

=== Group B ===
Pos	Team	Pld	W	L	PF	PA	PD	Pts	Qualification
1	Australia (H)	5	4	1	390	308	+82	9 (Note: Australia 75–72 Canada)	Final round
2	Canada	5	4	1	356	301	+55	9	Final round
3	Serbia	5	3	2	332	330	+2	8 (Note: Serbia 68–62 France)	Final round
4	France	5	3	2	318	296	+22	8	Final round
5	Japan	5	1	4	316	333	−17	6	
6	Mali	5	0	5	306	450	−144	5	

Source: FIBA
Rules for classification: 1) Points; 2) Head-to-head results; 3) Points difference; 4) Points scored.
(H) Hosts
Notes:

22 September 2022
Canada	67–60	Serbia
Japan	89–56	Mali
Australia	57–70	France
23 September 2022
Serbia	69–64	Japan
France	45–59	Canada
Mali	58–118	Australia
25 September 2022
Mali	59–74	France
Australia	69–54	Serbia
Japan	56–70	Canada
26 September 2022
Serbia	81–68	Mali
France	67–53	Japan
Canada	72–75	Australia
27 September 2022
Mali	65–88	Canada
Serbia	68–62	France
Australia	71–54	Japan

== Knockout stage ==
A draw was conducted to decide the pairings of the quarterfinals. The two best-ranked teams in each group were drawn against the two teams ranked third and fourth in the other group.

Quarter-finals
29 September
Belgium	69
Australia	86
29 September
China	85
France	71
29 September
Puerto Rico	60
Canada	79
29 September
United States	88
Serbia	55

Semi-finals
30 September
Australia	59
China	61
30 September
Canada	43
United States	83

Final
1 October
China	61
United States	83
Third place
1 October
Australia	95
Canada	65

== Final standings ==
Rank	Team	GP	W/L	FIBA World Rankings		
Rank	Team	GP	W/L	Before	After	Change
1st place, gold medalist(s)	United States	8	8–0	1	1	0
2nd place, silver medalist(s)	China	8	6–2	7	2	+5
3rd place, bronze medalist(s)	Australia	8	6–2	3	3	0
4	Canada	8	5–3	4	5	−1
Eliminated in Quarterfinals
5	Belgium	6	3–3	5	7	−2
6	Serbia	6	3–3	10	8	+2
7	France	6	3–3	6	6	0
8	Puerto Rico	6	2–4	16	10	+6
Eliminated in Preliminary round fifth placed teams
9	Japan	5	1–4	8	9	−1
10	South Korea	5	1–4	11	12	−1
Eliminated in Preliminary round sixth placed teams
11	Mali	5	0–5	35	26	+9
12	Bosnia and Herzegovina	5	0–5	24	14	+10

Qualified for the 2024 FIBA Women's Olympic Qualifying Tournaments

== Statistics and awards ==
=== Statistical leaders ===
==== Players ====
Points

Name	PPG
(Puerto Rico) Arella Guirantes	18.2
(South Korea) Kang Lee-seul	17.2
(United States) A'ja Wilson	17.2
(China) Li Meng	16.0
(United States) Kelsey Plum	15.8
(France) Gabby Williams	15.8

Rebounds

Name	RPG
(Mali) Sika Koné	11.8
(Canada) Kayla Alexander	9.6
(Bosnia and Herzegovina) Jonquel Jones	8.8
(Belgium) Emma Meesseman	8.5
(China) Han Xu	8.4

Assists

Name	APG
(Serbia) Yvonne Anderson	6.5
(Belgium) Julie Allemand	6.3
(Belgium) Emma Meesseman	6.3
(United States) Chelsea Gray	5.3
(Australia) Steph Talbot	5.3

Blocks

Name	BPG
(Mali) Diana Balayera	1.8
(China) Han Xu	1.8
(Belgium) Emma Meesseman	1.8
(Australia) Ezi Magbegor	1.4
(United States) Breanna Stewart	1.4

Steals

Name	SPG
(France) Sarah Michel	2.5
(United States) Alyssa Thomas	2.4
(United States) A'ja Wilson	2.2
(Belgium) Julie Allemand	1.8
(Serbia) Yvonne Anderson	1.8

Efficiency

Name	EFFPG
(United States) A'ja Wilson	24.5
(United States) Alyssa Thomas	20.0
(United States) Breanna Stewart	17.9
(China) Han Xu	17.6
(Belgium) Emma Meesseman	17.0

==== Teams ====
Points

Name	PPG
United States	98.8
China	81.4
Australia	78.8
Belgium	72.2
South Korea	69.2

Rebounds

Name	RPG
United States	46.9
Australia	45.3
Canada	42.5
China	41.9
Mali	40.0

Assists

Name	APG
United States	26.0
China	23.9
Belgium	22.0
Australia	21.1
South Korea	17.0

Blocks

Name	BPG
Australia	5.4
Canada	5.3
United States	5.0
Mali	3.8
France	3.7

Steals

Name	SPG
United States	11.8
France	10.8
Belgium	10.2
Canada	8.0
South Korea	7.8

Efficiency

Name	EFFPG
United States	134.3
China	104.4
Australia	97.6
Belgium	86.8
Canada	72.1

=== Awards ===
The awards were announced on 1 October 2022.

Award	Player
All-Tournament First Team	(United States) A'ja Wilson
All-Tournament First Team	(United States) Breanna Stewart
All-Tournament First Team	(China) Han Xu
All-Tournament First Team	(Australia) Steph Talbot
All-Tournament First Team	(Canada) Bridget Carleton
All-Tournament Second Team	(United States) Alyssa Thomas
All-Tournament Second Team	(China) Li Yueru
All-Tournament Second Team	(Puerto Rico) Arella Guirantes
All-Tournament Second Team	(France) Gabby Williams
All-Tournament Second Team	(Serbia) Yvonne Anderson
Most Valuable Player	(United States) A'ja Wilson
Best Defensive Player	(United States) Alyssa Thomas
Best Coach	(China) Zheng Wei

== Marketing ==
=== Logo and slogan ===
FIBA released the tournament slogan "Nothing Beats Like It" on 20 December 2021 as part of a promotional campaign.

The tournament logo was revealed on 10 May, 2021, in a ceremony to mark 500 days until the tournament. The logo was inspired from the Indigenous artwork My Story, created by 14-year-old Aboriginal basketballer and artist Amarlie "Marlii" Briscoe. The logo features a basketball incorporating the designs used in Briscoe's artwork, also encompassing the newly-designed trophy for the tournament. The logo was created by VMLY&R Branding alongside Indigenous Australian-led creative consultancy Campfire x and Briscoe herself.

=== Mascot ===
The mascot, "Karla the Kangaroo", was revealed on 22 September 2021, exactly one year before the tournament. The mascot's character is a teenage kangaroo from Alice Springs, wearing a blue uniform. The kangaroo was chosen to be the mascot due to its cultural importance to Australia. The mascot was designed by design agency Spike Creative.

== See also ==
- 2023 FIBA Men's Basketball World Cup
