= Rui Machida =

Japanese basketball player (born 1993)

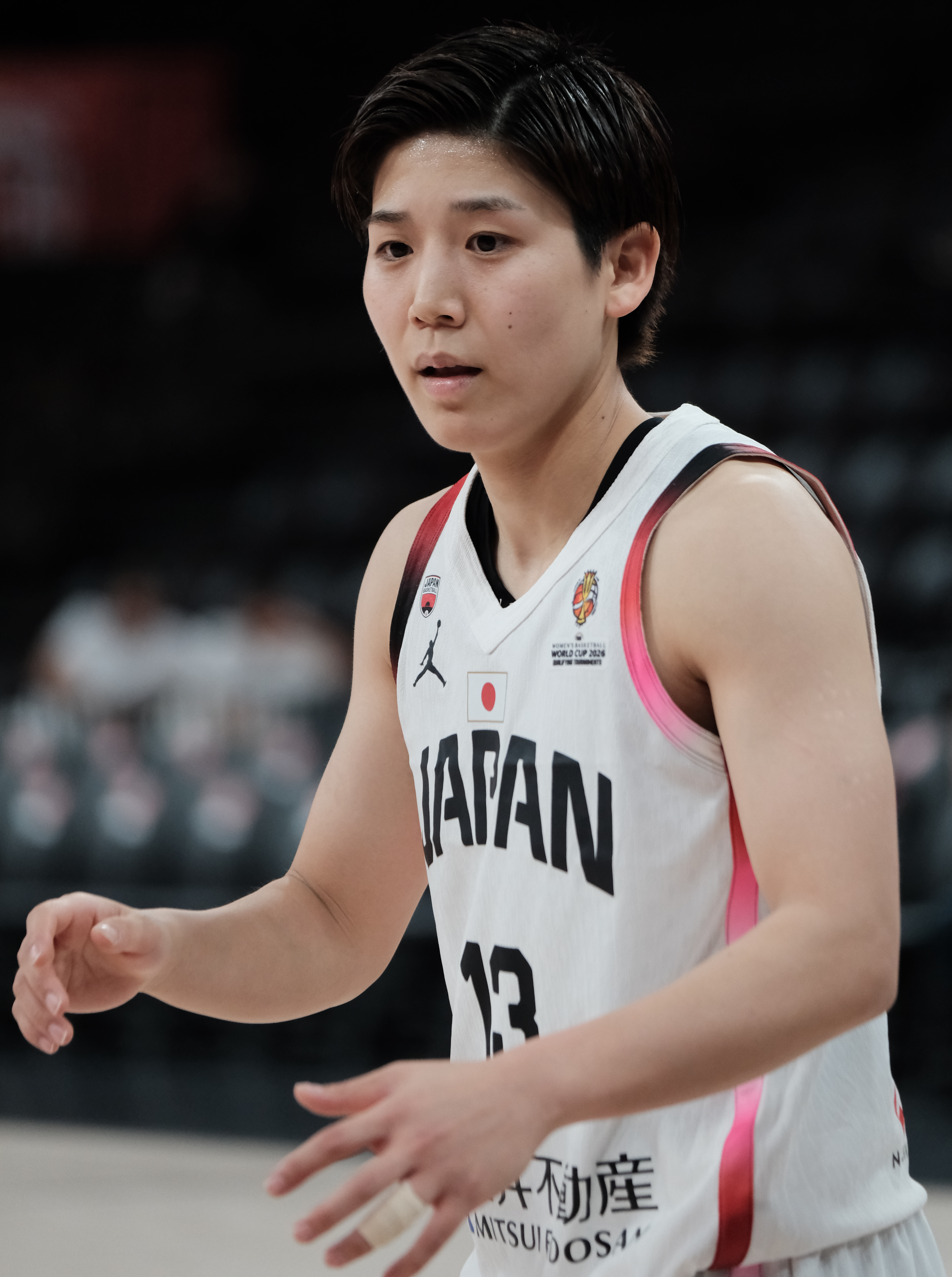
- Machida in 2026

No. 10 – Fujitsu Red Wave
- Position: Point guard
- League: Women's Japan Basketball League

Personal information
- Born: 8 March 1993 (age 33) Hokkaido, Japan
- Listed height: 5 ft 4 in (1.63 m)
- Listed weight: 126 lb (57 kg)

Career information
- WNBA draft: 2015: undrafted
- Playing career: 2011–present

Career history
- 2011–present: Fujitsu Red Wave
- 2022–2023: Washington Mystics
- Stats at Basketball Reference
Medals
Women's basketball
Representing Japan
Olympic Games
Silver medal – second place	2020 Tokyo	Team
FIBA Asia Cup
Gold medal – first place	2015 Wuhan	Japan
Gold medal – first place	2017 India
Gold medal – first place	2019 India
Asian Games
Bronze medal – third place	2014 Incheon	Team

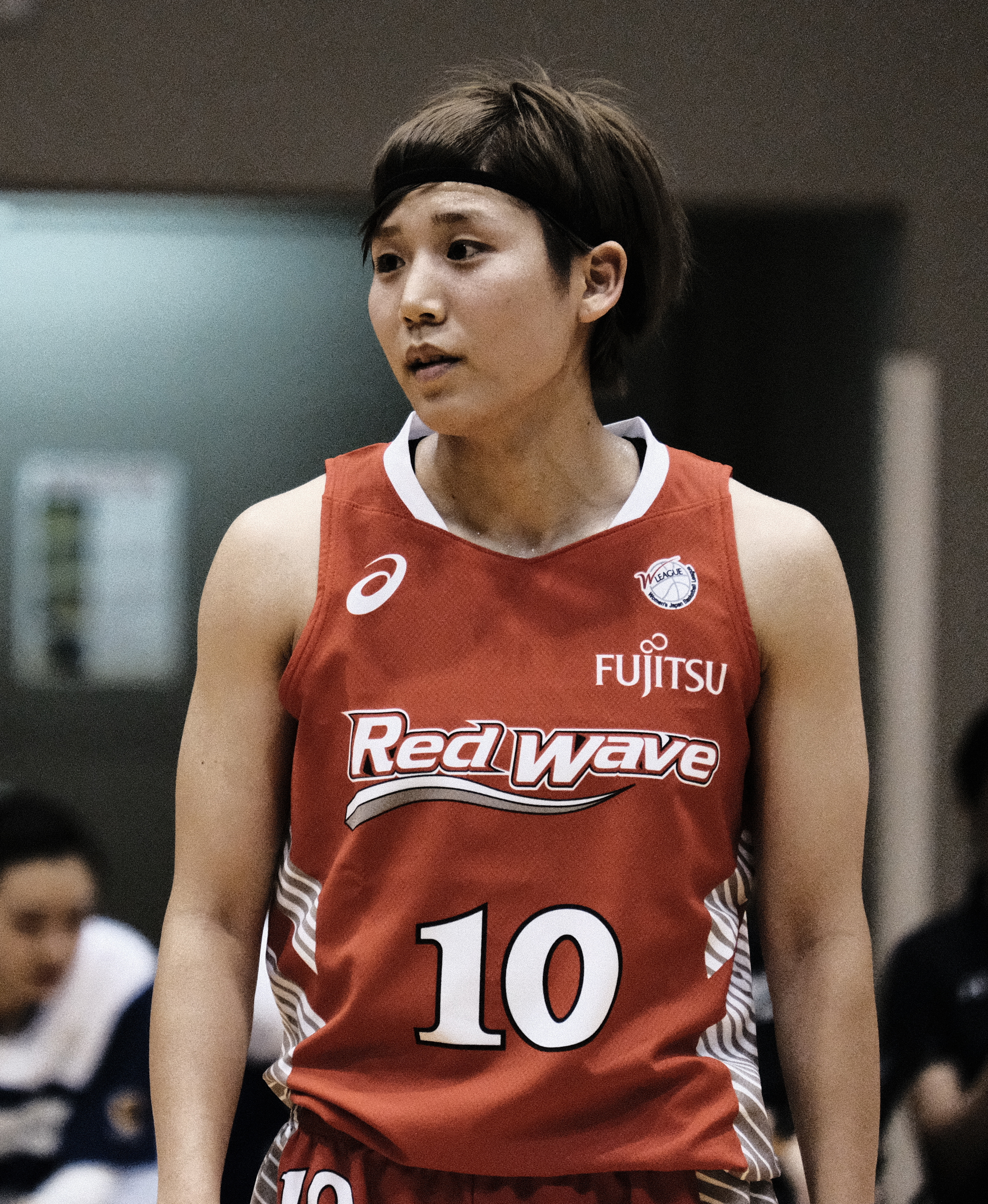

Rui Machida (町田瑠唯; born 8 March 1993) is a Japanese basketball player who plays for the Fujitsu Red Wave of the Women's Japan Basketball League (WJBL). She represented Japan in the women's tournament at the 2016 Summer Olympics and at the women's tournament at the 2020 Summer Olympics, winning a silver medal.

At the 2020 Summer Olympics, she set an Olympic record with 18 assists in Japan's 87–71 semifinals win against France.

== Career ==
She participated at the 2015 FIBA Women’s Asia Cup, 2017 Women’s Asia Cup, and 2019 Women’s Asia Cup.

== WNBA career statistics ==
Legend
GP	Games played	GS	Games started	MPG	Minutes per game	RPG	Rebounds per game
APG	Assists per game	SPG	Steals per game	BPG	Blocks per game	PPG	Points per game
TO	Turnovers per game	FG%	Field-goal percentage	3P%	3-point field-goal percentage	FT%	Free-throw percentage
**Bold**	Career best	°	League leader

=== Regular season ===
Year	Team	GP	GS	MPG	FG%	3P%	FT%	RPG	APG	SPG	BPG	TO	PPG
2022	Washington	36	2	12.9	.310	.206	.667	1.1	2.6	0.4	0.1	1.1	1.8
Career	1 year, 1 team	36	2	12.9	.310	.206	.667	1.1	2.6	0.4	0.1	1.1	1.8

=== Playoffs ===
Year	Team	GP	GS	MPG	FG%	3P%	FT%	RPG	APG	SPG	BPG	TO	PPG
2022	Washington	2	0	5.5	.667	.500	.000	0.5	0.5	0.0	0.0	0.0	2.5
Career	1 year, 1 team	2	0	5.5	.667	.500	.000	0.5	0.5	0.0	0.0	0.0	2.5
