= Jean-Aimé Toupane =

Senegalese-French basketball coach and player (born 1958)

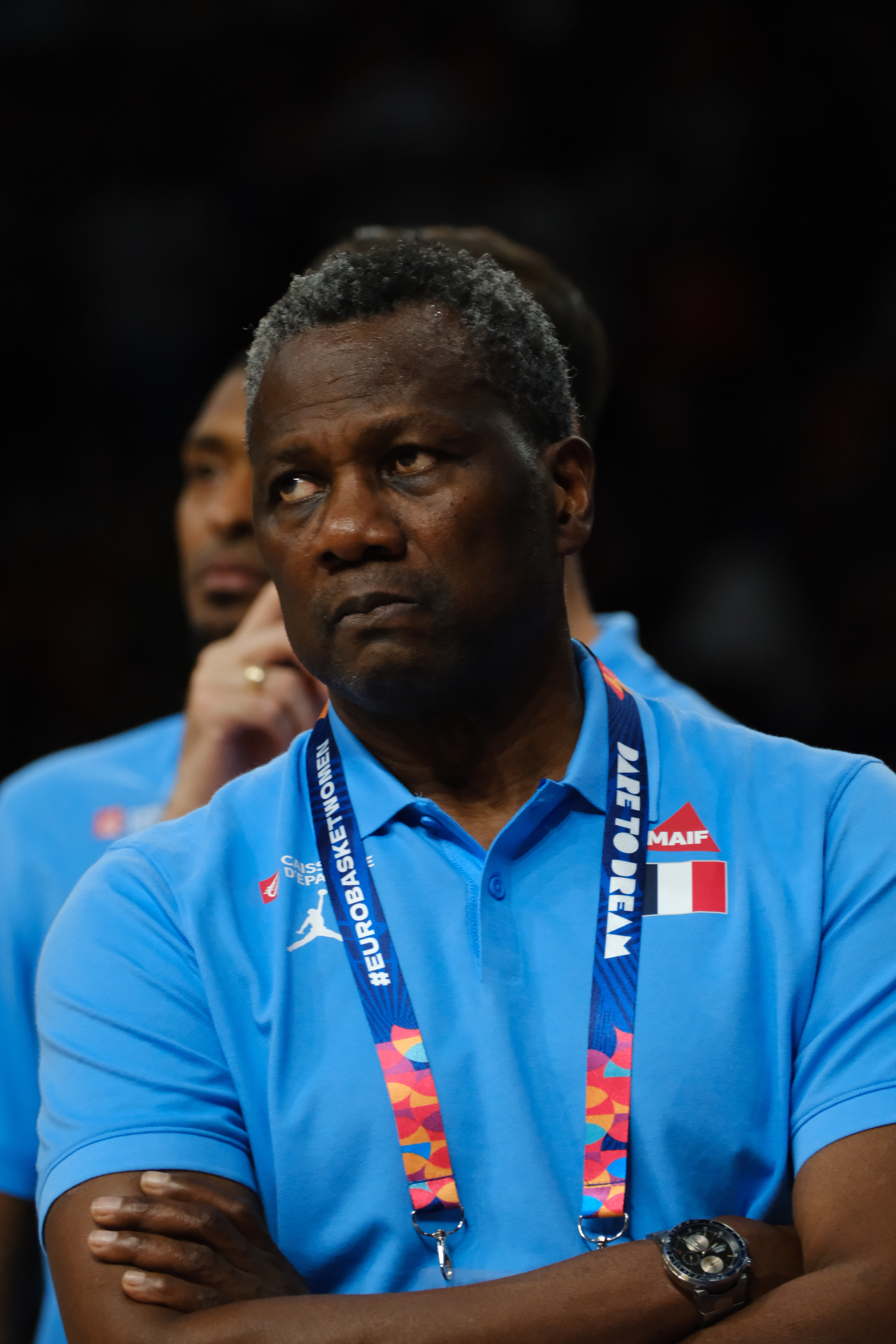

Personal information
- Born: 12 January 1958 (age 68) Kaolack, Senegal
- Position: Head coach
- Coaching career: 1998–present

Career history

Playing
- ?–1980: JA Dakar
- 1980–1982: BAC Mirande
- 1982–1984: Villeneuve-sur-Lot BC
- 1984–1988: AS Monaco
- 1988–1991: FC Mulhouse
- 1991–1993: BCM Gravelines-Dunkerque
- 1993–1994: FC Mulhouse
- 1994–1995: CRO Lyon
- 1995–1998: Toulouse Spacer's

Coaching
- 1998–1999: Spacer's Toulouse
- 1999–2001: RC Toulouse
- 2001–2008: Stade Clermontois
- 2008: Élan Béarnais
- 2012–2013: HTV
- 2013: Olympique Antibes
- 2014–2021: Centre Fédéral
- 2021–present: France (women)

Career highlights
- As player: Tournoi des As winner (1989); Pro B champion (1996); As head coach: Pro B champion (2004)
Medals
Men's basketball
Representing (Senegal) Senegal
AfroBasket
Gold medal – first place	1980 Morocco
Head coach for France
FIBA U20 EuroBasket
Gold medal – first place	2010 Croatia
Silver medal – second place	2009 Greece
Silver medal – second place	2012 Slovenia
Bronze medal – third place	2011 Spain
Bronze medal – third place	2017 Greece
Women's basketball
Head coach for France
Olympic Games
Silver medal – second place	2024 Paris	Team
World Cup
Silver medal – second place	2026 Germany
EuroBasket Women
Bronze medal – third place	2023 Israel/Slovenia

Jean-Aimé Toupane (born 12 January 1958) is a Senegalese-French professional basketball coach and former player who is the current head coach of the French women's national team. He was also the head coach of the French men's national under-20 team from 2009 to 2021.

== Playing career ==
Toupane, who took part in the 1978 World Championship in Manila with the Senegal national team (6.4 points per World Cup game), played at club level in his native country until 1980 for the Jeanne d'Arc Dakar team. In 1980 he moved from Senegal to France and played for the lower-class club BAC Mirande until 1982.

After two years (1982 to 1984) with the French second division club Villeneuve-sur-Lot, Toupane played for three teams in the top French league between 1984 and 1993: AS Monaco (1984 to 1988), FC Mulhouse (1989 to 1991), BCM Gravelines-Dunkerque (1991 to 1993). In 1993/94 Toupane was back in the service of Mulhouse, now in the second division. In 1994/95 he played for the first division club CRO Lyon and from 1995 to 1998 with Toulouse Spacer's (the first two years in the second division, 1997/98 in the first division as player-coach).

== Coaching career ==
After a year as player-coach in Toulouse, Toupane devoted himself entirely to coaching at the club and held the position until 2001. In 2001, Toupane began working as a coach in Clermont-Ferrand. He led Stade Clermontois from the third to the second division and in 2004 to promotion to the first division, where they competed until 2006. Toupane remained in office in Clermont-Ferrand until 2008. At the EuroBasket 2005, Toupane was assistant coach of the French men's national team, which won bronze at the tournament. He remained in this position for the national team until 2007.

At the start of the 2008/09 season, Toupane was coach of the first division club Élan Béarnais, but in mid-November 2008, he was sacked after six defeats in a row.

In 2012/13 Toupane coached the second division club HTV. In 2013, he took over as coach of the first division club Olympique Antibes. The collaboration ended in early December 2013 after the team had previously won only one of nine games under Toupane's leadership.

== National team career ==
In addition to his duties in the club, Toupane was the head coach of the French men's U20 national team from 2009 to 2021. Under his leadership, France became European champions once in the U20 age group (2010), twice runners-up (2009, 2012) and twice third in the European Championships (2011, 2017). Over the years, his players in the U20 national team have included future European top players such as Antoine Diot, Kevin Séraphin, Thomas Heurtel, Andrew Albicy, Evan Fournier, Léo Westermann, Élie Okobo and Amine Noua. From 2014 to 2021, Toupane also coached the INSEP performance center team Centre Fédéral, which competes in the third-highest division, Nationale 1, in professional competitions. At the beginning of October 2021, Toupane became the head coach of the French women's national team. In 2023, they won bronze medal in EuroBasket Women 2023.

== Head coaching record ==
=== International ===
Team	Year	G	W	L	W–L%	Tournament	TG	TW	TL	TW–L%	Result
France	2022	15	8	7	.533	World Cup	6	3	3	.500	7th place
France	2023	17	15	2	.882	EuroBasket	6	5	1	.833	Won bronze medal
France	2024	14	12	2	.857	Olympics	6	4	2	.667	Won silver medal
France	2025	14	11	3	.786	EuroBasket	6	4	2	.667	4th place
France	2026	12	10	2	.833	World Cup	6	5	1	.833	Won silver medal
Career		72	56	16	.778		30	21	9	.700	

== Personal life ==
Toupane is the father of Axel Toupane who also became a French international player.
