= Zheng Wei (basketball) =

Chinese basketball coach (born 1963)

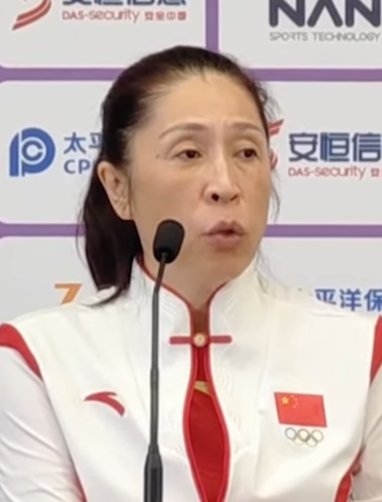
- Zheng in 2023

Personal information
- Born: 27 September 1963 (age 63) Wuhan, Hubei, China
- Listed height: 5 ft 7 in (1.70 m)

Career information
- Playing career: 1979–1998
- Position: Guard

Career history

Playing
- 1979–1985: Wuhan Military
- 1985–1998: Bayi

Coaching
- 1999–2008: Guangdong Kapok
- 2008–2020: Guangdong Dolphins (assistant)
- 2009–2021: China Women (assistant)
- 2020–2022: Inner Mongolia Rural Credit Union
- 2022: China Women (Interim)
- 2022–2025: China Women
- 2026–: Guangdong Vermilion Birds (assistant)

Career highlights
- As head coach: 2×WCBA champions (2021, 2022); Best Coach at 2022 FIBA Women's Basketball World Cup
Medals
Women's basketball
Representing China
FIBA World Championship
Silver medal – second place	1994 Australia	Team competition
Asian Games
Silver medal – second place	1990 Beijing	Team competition
Bronze medal – third place	1994 Hiroshima	Team competition
Head coach for China
FIBA Women's World Cup
Silver medal – second place	2022 Australia	Team competition

Zheng Wei (Chinese: 郑薇; pinyin: Zhèng Wēi, born 4 September 1963) is a Chinese basketball coach and former player. She most recently served as a head coach of the China women's national team. She won the silver medal at FIBA Women's Basketball World Cup as both player and coach.

== Playing career ==
Zheng spent her player career with PLA-affiliated teams. She started her career in 1979, playing for Wuhan Military team. In 1985 when the team were disbanded, she joined Bayi.

She represented China in the 1994 FIBA World Championship for Women, and won a silver medal.

She decided to retire in 1998 due to injuries.

== Coaching career ==
After her retirement, Zheng entered Guangdong Kapok. She became head coach of the team in 1999. After professionalization, she and the team acquired WCBA's runner-up in 2003.

In 2008, she stepped down and served as the assistant coach of the team until 2020.

In 2020, she moved north to join the Inner Mongolia Rural Credit Union team as part of a quite controversial project to support the newly established team. She won the WCBA title twice with the team.

== National team career ==
Since 2009, she worked as assistant coach for Chinese national team. With the team, she won gold medal at the 2009 East Asian Games, and the 2018 Asian Games.

In 2022, following Xu Limin's resignation, Zheng became the head coach of the national team. She was able to make historical breakthrough by winning the silver medal again at the 2022 FIBA Women's Basketball World Cup.
