= Yang Liwei (basketball) =

Chinese basketball player (born 1995)

No. 3 – Guangdong Vermilion Birds
- Position: Point guard
- League: WCBA

Personal information
- Born: 2 January 1995 (age 31) Kunming, Yunnan, China
- Listed height: 1.76 m (5 ft 9 in)
- Listed weight: 62 kg (137 lb)

Career information
- WNBA draft: 2017: undrafted
- Playing career: 2012–present
- Coaching career: 2024–present

Career history

Playing
- 2012–2020: Guangdong Vermilion Birds
- 2020–2023: Inner Mongolia Rural Credit Union
- 2023: Los Angeles Sparks
- 2023–present: Guangdong Vermilion Birds

Coaching
- 2024–present: Guangdong Vermilion Birds (assistant)
- Stats at Basketball Reference

Yang Liwei (Chinese: 杨力维; pinyin: Yáng Lìwéi, born 2 January 1995) is a Chinese basketball player for Guangdong Vermilion Birds women's basketball team and the Chinese national team, where she participated at the 2014 FIBA World Championship.

In February 2023, she joined Los Angeles Sparks of the Women's National Basketball Association (WNBA). However, she was waived from the team in May 2023, after playing two matches. In July 2023, she played for China in the women's Asia Cup basketball championship, and won the Asia cup title, after she and her teammates beat Japan in the final, with a score of 73-71. In September 2023, she along with Qin Haiyang, were chosen as the flag bearers representing China in the opening ceremony of the 2022 Asian Games in Hangzhou. She later competed for China in the women's 5-on-5 basketball tournament, and on 5 October 2023, her team won the gold after beating Japan in the final with a score of 74–72.
