= Basketball at the 2020 Summer Olympics – Women's tournament =

Tournament details
- Host country: Japan
- City: Saitama
- Dates: 26 July – 8 August 2021
- Teams: 12
- Venue: Saitama Super Arena

Final positions
- Champions: United States (9th title)
- Runners-up: Japan
- Third place: France
- Fourth place: Serbia

Tournament statistics
- Games played: 26
- Attendance: 0 (0 per game)
- MVP: (United States) Breanna Stewart
- Top scorer: (Belgium) Emma Meesseman (27.3 points per game)

The 2020 Summer Olympics women's basketball tournament in Tokyo, began on 26 July and ended on 8 August 2021. All games were played at the Saitama Super Arena in Saitama, Japan.

It was originally scheduled to be held in 2020, but on 24 March 2020, the Olympics were postponed to 2021 due to the COVID-19 pandemic. Because of this pandemic, the games were played behind closed doors.

The United States won the title for the ninth overall and seventh consecutive time by defeating Japan in the final, while France secured the bronze medal with a win over Serbia.

The medals for the competition were presented by Samira Asghari, IOC Member, Afghanistan, and the medalists' bouquets were presented by Andreas Zagklis, Secretary General of FIBA, Greece.

== Format ==
The twelve teams were split into three groups of four teams. The teams placed first and second in each group and the two best third-placed teams qualified for the quarter-finals. The eight teams were divided in a group D (best 4 teams) and a group E (remaining 4 teams). The quarter-final pairings were drawn on 2 August after the end of the group phase. After that, a knockout system was used.

== Competition schedule ==
G	Group stage	¼	Quarter-finals	½	Semi-finals	BM	Bronze medal game	GM	Gold medal game

Sun 25	Mon 26	Tue 27	Wed 28	Thu 29	Fri 30	Sat 31	Sun 1	Mon 2	Tue 3	Wed 4	Thu 5	Fri 6	Sat 7	Sun 8
	G	G		G	G		G	G		1/4		1/2	BM	GM

== Qualification ==
Means of qualification	Date	Venue	Berths	Qualified
Host nation	—N/a	—N/a	1	Japan
2018 FIBA Women's Basketball World Cup	22–30 September 2018	Spain	1	United States
2020 FIBA Women's Olympic Qualifying Tournaments	6–9 February 2020	(Belgium) Ostend	2	Belgium
2020 FIBA Women's Olympic Qualifying Tournaments	6–9 February 2020	(Belgium) Ostend	2	Canada
2020 FIBA Women's Olympic Qualifying Tournaments	6–9 February 2020	(France) Bourges	3	Australia
2020 FIBA Women's Olympic Qualifying Tournaments	6–9 February 2020	(France) Bourges	3	France
2020 FIBA Women's Olympic Qualifying Tournaments	6–9 February 2020	(France) Bourges	3	Puerto Rico
2020 FIBA Women's Olympic Qualifying Tournaments	6–9 February 2020	(Serbia) Belgrade	2	Nigeria
2020 FIBA Women's Olympic Qualifying Tournaments	6–9 February 2020	(Serbia) Belgrade	2	Serbia
2020 FIBA Women's Olympic Qualifying Tournaments	6–9 February 2020	(Serbia) Belgrade	3	China
2020 FIBA Women's Olympic Qualifying Tournaments	6–9 February 2020	(Serbia) Belgrade	3	South Korea
2020 FIBA Women's Olympic Qualifying Tournaments	6–9 February 2020	(Serbia) Belgrade	3	Spain
Total			12	

== Squads ==
Each NOC was limited to one team per tournament. Each team had a roster of twelve players, one of which could be a naturalized player.

== Draw ==
The draw was held at the FIBA Headquarters in Mies, Switzerland on 2 February 2021:

The 12 teams were divided into four pots of three teams based on their FIBA Women's World Ranking. The three groups were formed by drawing one team from each pot. Two teams from the same continent could not be placed into the same group, with the exception of European teams, where up to two teams could be in the same group.

Due to scheduling requests from the International Olympic Committee, defending champions the United States and hosts Japan were drawn into either Group B or C.

=== Seeding ===
Pot 1	Pot 2	Pot 3	Pot 4
United States; Australia; Spain	Canada; France; Belgium	Serbia; China; Japan	Nigeria; South Korea; Puerto Rico

== Referees ==
The following 30 referees were selected for the tournament.

- (Argentina) Juan Fernández
- (Argentina) Leandro Lezcano
- (Australia) Scott Beker
- (Australia) James Boyer
- (Bosnia and Herzegovina) Ademira Zurapović
- (Brazil) Guilherme Locatelli
- (Brazil) Andreia Silva
- (Canada) Matthew Kallio
- (Canada) Maripier Malo
- (Canada) Michael Weiland
- (Chinese Taipei) Yu Jung
- (Denmark) Maj Forsberg
- (France) Yohan Rosso
- (Iraq) Ahmed Al-Shuwaili
- (Italy) Manuel Mazzoni
- (Japan) Takaki Kato
- (Kazakhstan) Yevgeniy Mikheyev
- (Latvia) Mārtiņš Kozlovskis
- (Lebanon) Rabah Noujaim
- (Morocco) Samir Abaakil
- (Nigeria) Kingsley Ojeaburu
- (Norway) Gizella Györgyi
- (Philippines) Ferdinand Pascual
- (Puerto Rico) Luis Vázquez
- (Serbia) Aleksandar Glišić
- (Spain) Luis Castillo
- (Spain) Antonio Conde
- (Turkey) Yener Yılmaz
- (United States) Amy Bonner
- (United States) Steven Anderson

== Preliminary round ==
All times are local (UTC+9).

In the preliminary round, teams receive 2 classification points for a win, 1 classification point for a loss, and 0 classification points for a forfeit.

=== Group A ===
Pos	Team	Pld	W	L	PF	PA	PD	Pts	Qualification
1	Spain	3	3	0	234	205	+29	6	Quarterfinals
2	Serbia	3	2	1	207	214	−7	5	Quarterfinals
3	Canada	3	1	2	208	201	+7	4	
4	South Korea	3	0	3	183	212	−29	3	

Source: TOCOG and FIBA
Rules for classification: 1) classification points; 2) head-to-head results; 3) head-to-head game points difference; 4) head-to-head number of game points scored.

26 July 2021
10:00
v

Boxscore

South Korea	69–73	Spain
Scoring by quarter: 15–16, 20–17, 18–21, 16–19
Pts: Kang 26; Rebs: Park Ji-s. 10; Asts: Park H. 5		Pts: Ndour 28; Rebs: Gil 14; Asts: Ouviña 8

Saitama Super Arena, Saitama
Referees: Ferdinand Pascual (PHI), Andreia Silva (BRA), Kingsley Ojeaburu (NGR)

26 July 2021
17:20
v

Boxscore

Serbia	72–68	Canada
Scoring by quarter: 16–13, 20–15, 9–17, 27–23
Pts: Vasić 16; Rebs: Dabović 6 Asts: Crvendakić, Dabović 5		Pts: Fields 19; Rebs: Nurse 6 Asts: Achonwa 5

Saitama Super Arena, Saitama
Referees: Amy Bonner (USA), Leandro Lezcano (ARG), Maj Forsberg (DEN)

29 July 2021
10:00
v

Boxscore

Canada	74–53	South Korea
Scoring by quarter: 16–15, 17–13, 16–11, 25–14
Pts: Carleton 18; Rebs: Achonwa 10; Asts: Achonwa 5		Pts: Park Ji-s. 15; Rebs: Park Ji-s. 11; Asts: three players 3

Saitama Super Arena, Saitama
Referees: Amy Bonner (USA), James Boyer (AUS), Gizella Györgyi (NOR)

29 July 2021
17:20
v

Boxscore

Spain	85–70	Serbia
Scoring by quarter: 19–20, 22–24, 18–14, 26–12
Pts: Ndour 20; Rebs: Ndour 9 Asts: Ouviña 8		Pts: Brooks 16; Rebs: Anderson 8 Asts: three players 4

Saitama Super Arena, Saitama
Referees: Yohan Rosso (FRA), Maj Forsberg (DEN), Andreia Silva (BRA)

1 August 2021
10:00
v

Boxscore

Canada	66–76	Spain
Scoring by quarter: 13–23, 21–17, 13–20, 19–16
Pts: Nurse 14; Rebs: four players 6 Asts: Carleton 4		Pts: Ndour 20; Rebs: Ndour 11; Asts: Ouviña 7

Saitama Super Arena, Saitama
Referees: Yu Jung (TPE), Leandro Lezcano (ARG), Yevgeniy Mikheyev (KAZ)

1 August 2021
21:00
v

Boxscore

South Korea	61–65	Serbia
Scoring by quarter: 10–17, 14–15, 20–18, 17–15
Pts: Park Ji-h 17; Rebs: Park Ji-s. 11; Asts: Park Ji-h., Park Ji-s. 5		Pts: Crvendakić 15; Rebs: Vasić 10; Asts: three players 4

Saitama Super Arena, Saitama
Referees: Ferdinand Pascual (PHI), Amy Bonner (USA), Andreia Silva (BRA)

=== Group B ===
Pos	Team	Pld	W	L	PF	PA	PD	Pts	Qualification
1	United States	3	3	0	260	223	+37	6	Quarterfinals
2	Japan (H)	3	2	1	245	239	+6	5	Quarterfinals
3	France	3	1	2	239	229	+10	4	Quarterfinals
4	Nigeria	3	0	3	217	270	−53	3	

Source: TOCOG and FIBA
Rules for classification: 1) classification points; 2) head-to-head results; 3) head-to-head game points difference; 4) head-to-head number of game points scored.
(H) Hosts

27 July 2021
10:00
v

Boxscore

Japan	74–70	France
Scoring by quarter: 13–17, 21–19, 18–13, 22–21
Pts: Hayashi 12; Rebs: Akaho 9 Asts: Machida 11		Pts: Gruda 18; Rebs: Gruda 9 Asts: Johannès 4

Saitama Super Arena, Saitama
Referees: Maripier Malo (CAN), James Boyer (AUS), Yevgeniy Mikheyev (KAZ)

27 July 2021
13:40
v

Boxscore

Nigeria	72–81	United States
Scoring by quarter: 20–17, 12–27, 18–26, 22–11
Pts: Kalu 16; Rebs: Kunaiyi-Akpannah 9 Asts: Amukamara 4		Pts: Wilson 19; Rebs: Wilson 13; Asts: Bird 13

Saitama Super Arena, Saitama
Referees: Yu Jung (TPE), Scott Beker (AUS), Gizella Györgyi (NOR)

30 July 2021
13:40
v

Boxscore

United States	86–69	Japan
Scoring by quarter: 28–30, 21–10, 16–13, 21–16
Pts: Wilson 20; Rebs: Stewart 13; Asts: Bird, Stewart 6		Pts: Takada 15; Rebs: Akaho 8 Asts: Machida 11

Saitama Super Arena, Saitama
Referees: Yener Yılmaz (TUR), Yevgeniy Mikheyev (KAZ), Gizella Györgyi (NOR)

30 July 2021
17:20
v

Boxscore

France	87–62	Nigeria
Scoring by quarter: 18–12, 26–15, 23–15, 20–20
Pts: Gruda 14; Rebs: Gruda, Williams 9 Asts: Duchet 5		Pts: Amukamara 11; Rebs: three players 4 Asts: Amukamara, Kalu 3

Saitama Super Arena, Saitama
Referees: Scott Beker (AUS), Luis Castillo (ESP), Samir Abaakil (MAR)

2 August 2021
10:00
v

Boxscore

Nigeria	83–102	Japan
Scoring by quarter: 22–30, 16–21, 19–33, 26–18
Pts: Macaulay 18; Rebs: Chidom, Elonu 7 Asts: Nyingifa 8		Pts: Hayashi 23; Rebs: Akaho 7 Asts: Machida 15

Saitama Super Arena, Saitama
Referees: Juan Fernández (ARG), Andreia Silva (BRA), Yevgeniy Mikheyev (KAZ)

2 August 2021
13:40
v

Boxscore

France	82–93	United States
Scoring by quarter: 22–19, 22–31, 23–21, 15–22
Pts: Miyem 15; Rebs: Gruda 6 Asts: Johannès 7		Pts: Wilson 22; Rebs: Stewart, Wilson 7 Asts: Loyd 8

Saitama Super Arena, Saitama
Referees: Manuel Mazzoni (ITA), Ferdinand Pascual (PHI), Rabah Noujaim (LIB)

=== Group C ===
Pos	Team	Pld	W	L	PF	PA	PD	Pts	Qualification
1	China	3	3	0	247	191	+56	6	Quarterfinals
2	Belgium	3	2	1	234	196	+38	5	Quarterfinals
3	Australia	3	1	2	240	230	+10	4	Quarterfinals
4	Puerto Rico	3	0	3	176	280	−104	3	

Source: TOCOG and FIBA
Rules for classification: 1) classification points; 2) head-to-head results; 3) head-to-head game points difference; 4) head-to-head number of game points scored.

27 July 2021
17:20
v

Boxscore

Australia	70–85	Belgium
Scoring by quarter: 17–21, 24–16, 16–19, 13–29
Pts: Magbegor 20; Rebs: George 10; Asts: Mitchell 7		Pts: Meesseman 32; Rebs: Meesseman 9 Asts: Allemand 11

Saitama Super Arena, Saitama
Referees: Juan Fernández (ARG), Amy Bonner (USA), Yener Yılmaz (TUR)

27 July 2021
21:00
v

Boxscore

Puerto Rico	55–97	China
Scoring by quarter: 17–32, 9–21, 13–18, 16–26
Pts: Rosado 14; Rebs: Quiñones 5 Asts: Gwathmey 4		Pts: Li Yue. 21; Rebs: Han 14; Asts: Huang 7

Saitama Super Arena, Saitama
Referees: Takaki Kato (JPN), Maj Forsberg (DEN), Samir Abaakil (MAR)

30 July 2021
10:00
v

Boxscore

Belgium	87–52	Puerto Rico
Scoring by quarter: 23–16, 20–8, 17–13, 27–15
Pts: Meesseman 26; Rebs: Meesseman 15; Asts: Allemand 7		Pts: Gwathmey 20; Rebs: Gwathmey, Meléndez 5 Asts: Rosado 5

Saitama Super Arena, Saitama
Referees: Maripier Malo (CAN), Yu Jung (TPE), Kingsley Ojeaburu (NGA)

30 July 2021
21:00
v

Boxscore

China	76–74	Australia
Scoring by quarter: 27–19, 11–19, 17–9, 21–27
Pts: Wang 20; Rebs: Shao 8 Asts: Li M. 7		Pts: Magbegor 15; Rebs: George 5 Asts: Ebzery 4

Saitama Super Arena, Saitama
Referees: Matthew Kallio (CAN), Maj Forsberg (DEN), Ahmed Al-Shuwaili (IRQ)

2 August 2021
17:20
v

Boxscore

China	74–62	Belgium
Scoring by quarter: 17–21, 21–16, 21–15, 15–10
Pts: Li Yue. 14; Rebs: Li Yue. 8 Asts: Wang 8		Pts: Meesseman 24; Rebs: Meesseman 7 Asts: Mestdagh 5

Saitama Super Arena, Saitama
Referees: Leandro Lezcano (ARG), Yener Yılmaz (TUR), Maj Forsberg (DEN)

2 August 2021
21:00
v

Boxscore

Australia	96–69	Puerto Rico
Scoring by quarter: 22–24, 23–20, 23–8, 28–17
Pts: Tolo 26; Rebs: Tolo 17; Asts: Mitchell 6		Pts: Gwathmey 26; Rebs: Gibson, Gwathmey 6 Asts: Meléndez, Rosado 3

Saitama Super Arena, Saitama
Referees: Alexander Glišić (SRB), Samir Abaakil (MAR), Gizella Györgyi (NOR)

=== Third-placed teams ranking ===
Pos	Grp	Team	Pld	W	L	PF	PA	PD	Pts	Qualification
1	C	Australia	3	1	2	240	230	+10	4	Quarterfinals
2	B	France	3	1	2	239	229	+10	4	Quarterfinals
3	A	Canada	3	1	2	208	201	+7	4	

Source: TOCOG and FIBA
Rules for classification: 1) classification points; 2) game points difference; 3) number of game points scored; 4) FIBA ranking.

== Knockout stage ==
=== Ranking ===
A draw after the preliminary round decided the pairings, where a seeded team played an unseeded team. The draw was held after the last group stage match on 2 August. Teams qualified were divided into two pots:

- Pot D comprised the three first-placed teams from the group phase, along with the best second-placed team.
- Pot E comprised the two remaining second-placed teams, along with the two best third-placed teams.

Draw principles:

- Each game pairing had one team from Pot D and one team from Pot E.
- Teams from the same group could not be drawn against each other in the quarterfinals.
- The second-placed team from Pot D could not be drawn against the third-placed teams from Pot E.

Pos	Team	Pld	W	L	PF	PA	PD	Pts	Qualification
1	China	3	3	0	247	191	+56	6	Seeded
2	United States	3	3	0	260	223	+37	6	Seeded
3	Spain	3	3	0	234	205	+29	6	Seeded
4	Belgium	3	2	1	234	196	+38	5	Seeded
5	Japan	3	2	1	245	239	+6	5	Unseeded
6	Serbia	3	2	1	207	214	−7	5	Unseeded
7	Australia	3	1	2	240	230	+10	4	Unseeded
8	France	3	1	2	239	229	+10	4	Unseeded

Source: TOCOG
Rules for classification: 1) points; 2) points difference; 3) points scored.

=== Bracket ===
Quarterfinals
4 August
Australia	55
United States	79
4 August
China	70
Serbia	77
4 August
Japan	86
Belgium	85
4 August
Spain	64
France	67

Semifinals
6 August
United States	79
Serbia	59
6 August
Japan	87
France	71

Gold medal
8 August
United States	90
Japan	75
Bronze medal
7 August
Serbia	76
France	91

=== Quarterfinals ===
4 August 2021
10:00
v

Boxscore

China	70–77	Serbia
Scoring by quarter: 14–16, 19–19, 25–14, 12–28
Pts: Shao 17; Rebs: Han 7 Asts: Li Yua. 6		Pts: Brooks 18; Rebs: Vasić 10; Asts: Dabović 6

Saitama Super Arena, Saitama
Referees: Luis Castillo (ESP), Maripier Malo (CAN), Rabah Noujaim (LIB)

4 August 2021
13:40
v

Boxscore

Australia	55–79	United States
Scoring by quarter: 12–26, 15–22, 12–20, 16–11
Pts: Mitchell 14; Rebs: Allen, George 7 Asts: Mitchell 6		Pts: Stewart 23; Rebs: Griner 8 Asts: Gray 8

Saitama Super Arena, Saitama
Referees: Ferdinand Pascual (PHI), Takaki Kato (JPN), Yevgeniy Mikheyev (KAZ)

4 August 2021
17:20
v

Boxscore

Japan	86–85	Belgium
Scoring by quarter: 19–16, 22–26, 20–26, 25–17
Pts: Miyazawa 21; Rebs: Akaho 7 Asts: Machida 14		Pts: Meesseman 25; Rebs: Meesseman 11; Asts: Allemand 8

Saitama Super Arena, Saitama
Referees: Yu Jung (TPE), Amy Bonner (USA), James Boyer (AUS)

4 August 2021
21:00
v

Boxscore

Spain	64–67	France
Scoring by quarter: 16–21, 14–15, 18–19, 16–12
Pts: Ndour 16; Rebs: Ndour 11; Asts: Gil 4		Pts: Johannès 18; Rebs: three players 5 Asts: Duchet 5

Saitama Super Arena, Saitama
Referees: Manuel Mazzoni (ITA), Andreia Silva (BRA), Scott Beker (AUS)

=== Semifinals ===
6 August 2021
13:40
v

Boxscore

United States	79–59	Serbia
Scoring by quarter: 25–12, 16–11, 17–16, 21–20
Pts: Griner 15; Rebs: Griner 12; Asts: Bird, Taurasi 4		Pts: Anderson 15; Rebs: Dugalić 10; Asts: Vasić 3

Saitama Super Arena, Saitama
Referees: Antonio Conde (ESP), Yu Jung (TPE), Andreia Silva (BRA)

6 August 2021
20:00
v

Boxscore

Japan	87–71	France
Scoring by quarter: 14–22, 27–12, 27–16, 19–21
Pts: Akaho 17; Rebs: Akaho, Miyazawa 7 Asts: Machida 18		Pts: Gruda 18; Rebs: Williams 8 Asts: Williams 7

Saitama Super Arena, Saitama
Referees: Maripier Malo (CAN), Luis Castillo (ESP), Yevgeniy Mikheyev (KAZ)

=== Bronze medal game ===
7 August 2021
16:00
v

Boxscore

Serbia	76–91	France
Scoring by quarter: 23–19, 17–24, 16–24, 20–24
Pts: Anderson 24; Rebs: Vasić 8 Asts: Anderson, Brooks 5		Pts: Williams 17; Rebs: Williams 8 Asts: three players 4

Saitama Super Arena, Saitama
Referees: Juan Fernández (ARG), Amy Bonner (USA), Takaki Kato (JPN)

=== Gold medal game ===
8 August 2021
11:30
v

Boxscore

United States	90–75	Japan
Scoring by quarter: 23–14, 27–25, 25–17, 15–19
Pts: Griner 30; Rebs: Stewart 14; Asts: Taurasi 8		Pts: Takada 17; Rebs: Okoye 8 Asts: Machida 6

Saitama Super Arena, Saitama
Referees: Manuel Mazzoni (ITA), Andreia Silva (BRA), Maripier Malo (CAN)

== Result ==
2020 Women's Olympic Basketball Champions

United States
Ninth title

== Final ranking ==
Rank	Team	Record
Gold medal	United States	6–0
Silver medal	Japan	4–2
Bronze medal	France	3–3
4	Serbia	3–3
5	China	3–1
6	Spain	3–1
7	Belgium	2–2
8	Australia	1–3
9	Canada	1–2
10	South Korea	0–3
11	Nigeria	0–3
12	Puerto Rico	0–3

== Statistics and awards ==
=== Statistical leaders ===
==== Players ====
Points

Name	PPG
(Belgium) Emma Meesseman	27.3
(Spain) Astou Ndour	22.7
(United States) A'ja Wilson	20.0
(Puerto Rico) Jazmon Gwathmey	18.0
(United States) Brittney Griner	17.3

Rebounds

Name	RPG
(United States) Breanna Stewart	11.3
(South Korea) Park Ji-su	10.7
(Belgium) Emma Meesseman	10.3
(Spain) Astou Ndour	10.0
(Spain) Laura Gil	9.3
(United States) A'ja Wilson	9.3

Assists

Name	APG
(Japan) Rui Machida	10.8
(Spain) Cristina Ouviña	7.7
(Belgium) Julie Allemand	7.3
(United States) Sue Bird	6.5
(United States) Breanna Stewart	5.5

Blocks

Name	BPG
(South Korea) Park Ji-su	3.3
(United States) A'ja Wilson	2.8
(Spain) Astou Ndour	2.3
(China) Han Xu	2.0
(Spain) Laura Gil	1.7

Steals

Name	SPG
(Belgium) Emma Meesseman	3.7
(France) Gabby Williams	3.5
(Nigeria) Ezinne Kalu	2.3
(Spain) Laura Gil	2.3
(Belgium) Kyara Linskens	2.0
(Canada) Natalie Achonwa	2.0
(Canada) Kia Nurse	2.0
(Nigeria) Promise Amukamara	2.0
(Puerto Rico) Allison Gibson	2.0

Efficiency

Name	EFFPG
(Belgium) Emma Meesseman	36.7
(Spain) Astou Ndour	29.3
(United States) A'ja Wilson	28.8
(United States) Breanna Stewart	23.8
(China) Li Yueru	21.0
(United States) Brittney Griner	21.0

==== Teams ====
Points

Team	PPG
United States	84.7
Japan	82.2
Belgium	79.8
China	79.3
France	78.0

Rebounds

Team	RPG
United States	45.5
China	43.0
Belgium	39.8
Australia	39.3
Canada	38.7

Assists

Team	APG
United States	26.0
Belgium	25.5
China	24.8
Australia	23.2
Japan	22.3

Blocks

Team	BPG
United States	5.5
Nigeria	4.0
South Korea	4.0
Spain	3.8
China	3.3

Steals

Team	SPG
Nigeria	9.3
Belgium	9.3
France	8.8
Canada	8.7
Puerto Rico	8.7

Efficiency

Team	EFFPG
United States	113.5
Belgium	102.8
China	99.0
France	92.7
Spain	87.5

=== Awards ===
The awards were announced on 8 August 2021.

All-Star Team
Guard	Forwards	Center
(Japan) Rui Machida	(Belgium) Emma Meesseman (United States) Breanna Stewart (United States) A'ja Wilson	(France) Sandrine Gruda
MVP: (United States) Breanna Stewart

== See also ==
- Basketball at the 2020 Summer Olympics – Men's tournament
