= Yvonne Anderson =

American and Serbian basketball player (born 1990)

- Anderson with Fenerbahçe in 2026

No. 1 – Fenerbahçe
- Position: Point guard
- League: KBSL

Personal information
- Born: March 8, 1990 (age 36) Springdale, Arkansas, US
- Listed height: 5 ft 9 in (1.75 m)

Career information
- High school: Hickman (Columbia, Missouri)
- College: Texas (2008–2012)
- WNBA draft: 2012: undrafted
- Playing career: 2013–present

Career history
- 2013–2014: Lady Cobras
- 2013–2014: Visby Ladies
- 2014–2015: B.B.C. Amicale Steesel
- 2015–2016: Pallacanestro Torino
- 2016–2017: Galatasaray
- 2017–2018: Olympiacos
- 2018: Kayseri Basketbol
- 2019: Mersin Büyükşehir Belediyespor
- 2019–2020: Beşiktaş JK
- 2020–2022: Reyer Venezia
- 2022: Connecticut Sun
- 2022–2023: Tango Bourges Basket
- 2023–2024: Fenerbahçe
- 2024–2025: Çukurova Basketbol
- 2025: Minnesota Lynx
- 2025: ŽKK Crvena zvezda
- 2026: Valencia Basket
- 2026–present: Fenerbahçe

Career highlights
- EuroLeague champion (2024); 2x FIBA Europe SuperCup Women winner (2023, 2026); Turkish League champion (2023–24); Turkish Cup winner (2024); Miss Show-Me Basketball (2008)
- Stats at Basketball Reference
Medals
Women's basketball
Representing Serbia
EuroBasket
| Gold medal – first place | 2021 France/Spain |

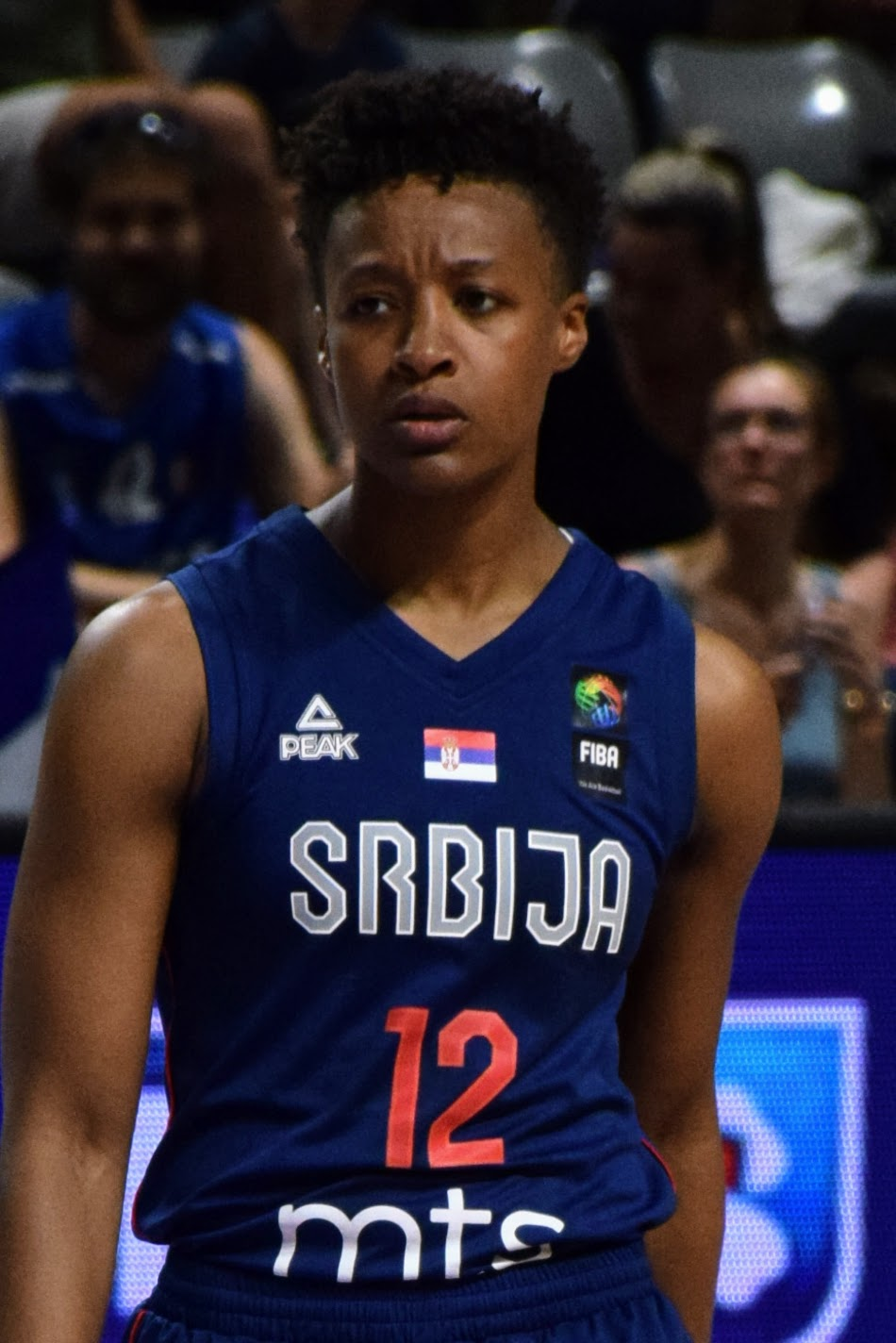

Yvonne Marche Anderson (Serbian Cyrillic: Ивон Андерсон, romanized: Ivon Anderson; born March 8, 1990) is an American-Serbian professional basketball player for Fenerbahçe of the Turkish Super League. She also represents the Serbia national team.

Born in the United States, she obtained Serbian citizenship and represents Serbia internationally. She was a standout basketball player at the University of Texas. She is the daughter of basketball coach Mike Anderson.

== Professional career ==
=== WNBA ===
==== Connecticut Sun (2022) ====
On February 22, 2022, Anderson signed a training camp contract with the Connecticut Sun. Anderson made the roster and played in 11 games before getting waived on June 11.

On February 6, 2025, Anderson signed a two-year contract with the Sun. However, she was waived by the Sun on May 15, before the start of the season.

==== Minnesota Lynx (2025) ====
On July 28, 2025, Anderson signed a 7-day contract with the Minnesota Lynx. Anderson made her Lynx debut on August 2 versus the Las Vegas Aces, where she record 2 assists, 2 steals, and 1 rebound in the Lynx 111-58 victory. On August 4, Anderson signed a second 7-day contract with the Lynx, but she was released by the team on August 9.

== National team career ==
On 11 November 2020, Anderson made her international debut for Serbia in an 82–71 win over Lithuania at the EuroBasket Women 2021 qualification. She recorded 13 points, 4 rebounds and 7 assists in her debut.

In June 2021, she won a gold medal at the Eurobasket 2021 in Valencia with the Serbian national team.

== Texas statistics ==
Legend
| GP | Games played | GS | Games started | MPG | Minutes per game |
| FG% | Field goal percentage | 3P% | 3-point field goal percentage | FT% | Free throw percentage |
| RPG | Rebounds per game | APG | Assists per game | SPG | Steals per game |
| BPG | Blocks per game | PPG | Points per game | **Bold** | Career high |

| Year | Team | GP | Points | FG% | 3P% | FT% | RPG | APG | SPG | BPG | PPG |
|---|---|---|---|---|---|---|---|---|---|---|---|
| 2008-09 | Texas | 33 | 154 | 42.9% | 29.4% | 69.5% | 1.6 | 1.4 | 1.0 | 0.1 | 4.7 |
| 2009-10 | Texas | 33 | 141 | 39.5% | 32.4% | 57.4% | 1.7 | 1.2 | 1.1 | **0.2** | 4.3 |
| 2010-11 | Texas | 33 | **389** | **46.6%** | **43.2%** | **70.2%** | 3.0 | 3.2 | 1.7 | - | **11.8** |
| 2011-12 | Texas | 31 | 363 | 40.8% | 30.4% | 67.7% | **3.5** | **5.5** | **2.7** | 0.1 | 11.7 |
| Career | | 130 | 1047 | 42.9% | 135.5% | 56.5% | 17.9 | 2.8 | 1.6 | 0.1 | 8.1 |

== WNBA career statistics ==
=== Regular season ===
| Year | Team | GP | GS | MPG | FG% | 3P% | FT% | RPG | APG | SPG | BPG | TO | PPG |
|---|---|---|---|---|---|---|---|---|---|---|---|---|---|
| 2022 | Connecticut | **11** | 0 | 9.2 | **.462** | **.400** | **1.000** | 0.8 | 1.1 | 0.3 | 0.2 | 1.0 | **3.2** |
| 2025 | Minnesota | 1 | 0 | **12.0** | .00 | .000 | — | **1.0** | **2.0** | **2.0** | — | — | — |
| **Career** | 2 years, 2 teams | 12 | 0 | 9.4 | .414 | .364 | 1.000 | 0.8 | 1.2 | 0.4 | 0.2 | 0.9 | 2.9 |

== See also ==
- List of Serbian WNBA players
