= 2018 FIBA Women's Basketball World Cup squads =

The following is the list of squads for each of the 16 teams who competed in the 2018 FIBA Women's Basketball World Cup, which was held in Spain between September 22–30. Each team selected a squad of 12 players for the tournament.

== Group A ==
=== Canada ===
Canada women's national basketball team – 2018 FIBA Women's Basketball World Cup roster
Players
Coaches

| Pos. | No. | Name | Age – Date of birth | Height | Club | Ctr. |
|---|---|---|---|---|---|---|
| G | 4 | Miah-Marie Langlois | 27 – 21 September 1991 | 1.73 m (5 ft 8 in) | Dynamo Novosibirsk | (Russia) |
| G | 5 | Kia Nurse | 22 – 22 February 1996 | 1.83 m (6 ft 0 in) | New York Liberty | (United States) |
| G | 6 | Bridget Carleton | 21 – 22 May 1997 | 1.86 m (6 ft 1 in) | Iowa State Cyclones | (United States) |
| F | 7 | Nayo Raincock-Ekunwe | 26 – 15 September 1992 | 1.88 m (6 ft 2 in) | Bourges | (France) |
| G | 8 | Kim Gaucher | 34 – 7 May 1984 | 1.86 m (6 ft 1 in) | Mondeville | (France) |
| F | 9 | Miranda Ayim | 30 – 6 May 1988 | 1.91 m (6 ft 3 in) | Landes | (France) |
| G | 10 | Nirra Fields | 24 – 3 December 1993 | 1.68 m (5 ft 6 in) | Energa Toruń | (Poland) |
| F | 11 | Natalie Achonwa | 25 – 22 November 1992 | 1.91 m (6 ft 3 in) | Indiana Fever | (United States) |
| G | 12 | Jamie Scott | 24 – 9 August 1994 | 1.78 m (5 ft 10 in) | Bendigo Spirit | (Australia) |
| G | 13 | Shay Colley | 22 – 6 January 1996 | 1.76 m (5 ft 9 in) | Michigan State Spartans | (United States) |
| F | 15 | Michelle Plouffe | 26 – 15 September 1992 | 1.93 m (6 ft 4 in) | ASVEL | (France) |
| C | 22 | Ruth Hamblin | 24 – 24 June 1994 | 1.98 m (6 ft 6 in) | Castors Braine | (Belgium) |

Head coach

- (Canada) Lisa Thomaidis

Assistant coach(es)

- (Canada) Steve Baur
- (Canada) Carly Clarke

Legend

- Club – describes last
  club before the tournament
- Age – describes age
  on 22 September 2018

=== France ===
France women's national basketball team – 2018 FIBA Women's Basketball World Cup roster
Players
Coaches

| Pos. | No. | Name | Age – Date of birth | Height | Club | Ctr. |
|---|---|---|---|---|---|---|
| G | 0 | Olivia Époupa | 24 – 30 April 1994 | 1.64 m (5 ft 5 in) | Galatasaray | (Turkey) |
| F | 5 | Endéné Miyem | 30 – 15 May 1988 | 1.88 m (6 ft 2 in) | Minnesota Lynx | (United States) |
| C | 7 | Sandrine Gruda | 31 – 25 June 1987 | 1.93 m (6 ft 4 in) | Yakın Doğu Üniversitesi | (Turkey) |
| C | 8 | Héléna Ciak | 28 – 15 December 1989 | 1.97 m (6 ft 6 in) | Dynamo Kursk | (Russia) |
| F | 10 | Sarah Michel | 29 – 10 January 1989 | 1.80 m (5 ft 11 in) | Bourges | (France) |
| F | 11 | Valériane Ayayi | 24 – 29 April 1994 | 1.84 m (6 ft 0 in) | Bourges | (France) |
| C | 12 | Alexia Chartereau | 20 – 5 September 1998 | 1.90 m (6 ft 3 in) | Bourges | (France) |
| G | 17 | Marine Johannès | 23 – 21 January 1995 | 1.77 m (5 ft 10 in) | Bourges | (France) |
| F | 21 | Marième Badiane | 23 – 24 November 1994 | 1.90 m (6 ft 3 in) | ASVEL | (France) |
| G | 39 | Alix Duchet | 20 – 30 December 1997 | 1.63 m (5 ft 4 in) | Cavigal Nice | (France) |
| G | 47 | Romane Bernies | 25 – 27 June 1993 | 1.70 m (5 ft 7 in) | Montpellier | (France) |
| F | 93 | Diandra Tchatchouang | 27 – 14 June 1991 | 1.89 m (6 ft 2 in) | Bourges | (France) |

Head coach

- (France) Valérie Garnier

Assistant coach(es)

- (France) Grégory Halin
- (France) Olivier Lafargue

Legend

- Club – describes last
  club before the tournament
- Age – describes age
  on 22 September 2018

=== Greece ===
Greece women's national basketball team – 2018 FIBA Women's Basketball World Cup roster
Players
Coaches

| Pos. | No. | Name | Age – Date of birth | Height | Club | Ctr. |
|---|---|---|---|---|---|---|
| F | 5 | Evdokia Stamati | 34 – 2 August 1984 | 1.81 m (5 ft 11 in) | Olympiacos | (Greece) |
| G | 6 | Iouliti Lymoura | 33 – 10 March 1985 | 1.80 m (5 ft 11 in) | Olympiacos | (Greece) |
| F | 7 | Anna Spyridopoulou | 29 – 2 November 1988 | 1.84 m (6 ft 0 in) | Olympiacos | (Greece) |
| G | 8 | Pinelopi Pavlopoulou | 22 – 3 March 1996 | 1.73 m (5 ft 8 in) | Olympiacos | (Greece) |
| G | 9 | Evanthia Maltsi | 39 – 30 December 1978 | 1.80 m (5 ft 11 in) | Olympiacos | (Greece) |
| G | 11 | Angeliki Nikolopoulou | 27 – 2 May 1991 | 1.74 m (5 ft 9 in) | Olympiacos | (Greece) |
| F | 12 | Katerina Sotiriou | 34 – 3 January 1984 | 1.86 m (6 ft 1 in) | Olympiacos | (Greece) |
| F/C | 13 | Afroditi Kosma | 35 – 6 June 1983 | 1.87 m (6 ft 2 in) | Olympiacos | (Greece) |
| F | 15 | Artemis Spanou | 25 – 1 January 1993 | 1.88 m (6 ft 2 in) | UNI Győr | (Hungary) |
| F | 19 | Styliani Kaltsidou | 35 – 12 January 1983 | 1.88 m (6 ft 2 in) | CCC Polkowice | (Poland) |
| G/F | 21 | Eleanna Christinaki | 21 – 16 December 1996 | 1.83 m (6 ft 0 in) | Maryland Terrapins | (United States) |
| C | 34 | Maria Emmanouela Fasoula | 21 – 2 September 1997 | 1.92 m (6 ft 4 in) | Vanderbilt Commodores | (United States) |

Head coach

- (Greece) Kostas Keramidas

Assistant coach(es)

- (Greece) Eleni Kafantari
- (Greece) Angelos Tsikliras

Legend

- Club – describes last
  club before the tournament
- Age – describes age
  on 22 September 2018

=== South Korea ===
South Korea women's national basketball team – 2018 FIBA Women's Basketball World Cup roster
Players
Coaches

| Pos. | No. | Name | Age – Date of birth | Height | Club | Ctr. |
|---|---|---|---|---|---|---|
| G | 1 | Park Ha-na | 28 – 14 September 1990 | 1.76 m (5 ft 9 in) | Yongin Samsung Blueminx | (South Korea) |
| F | 2 | Park Ji-hyun | 18 – 7 April 2000 | 1.80 m (5 ft 11 in) |
| F | 3 | Kang Lee-seul | 24 – 5 April 1994 | 1.80 m (5 ft 11 in) | Bucheon KEB Hana Bank | (South Korea) |
| G | 5 | Sim Sung-young | 25 – 14 October 1992 | 1.65 m (5 ft 5 in) | Cheongju KB Stars | (South Korea) |
| F | 6 | Choi Eun-sil | 24 – 17 August 1994 | 1.83 m (6 ft 0 in) | Asan Woori Bank Wibee | (South Korea) |
| G | 7 | Park Hye-jin | 28 – 22 July 1990 | 1.78 m (5 ft 10 in) | Asan Woori Bank Wibee | (South Korea) |
| F | 9 | Baek Ji-eun | 30 – 5 January 1988 | 1.77 m (5 ft 10 in) | Bucheon KEB Hana Bank | (South Korea) |
| F | 10 | Kim Dan-bi | 28 – 27 February 1990 | 1.80 m (5 ft 11 in) | Bucheon KEB Hana Bank | (South Korea) |
| G | 11 | Lim Yung-hui | 38 – 29 May 1980 | 1.78 m (5 ft 10 in) | Asan Woori Bank Wibee | (South Korea) |
| F | 13 | Kim Jung-eun | 31 – 7 September 1987 | 1.80 m (5 ft 11 in) | Bucheon KEB Hana Bank | (South Korea) |
| C | 19 | Park Ji-su | 19 – 6 December 1998 | 1.92 m (6 ft 4 in) | Las Vegas Aces | (United States) |
| G/F | 35 | Kim Han-byul | 31 – 21 November 1986 | 1.78 m (5 ft 10 in) | Yongin Samsung Blueminx | (South Korea) |

Head coach

- (South Korea) Lee Moon-kyu

Assistant coach(es)

- (South Korea) Ha Sook-rye

Legend

- Club – describes last
  club before the tournament
- Age – describes age
  on 22 September 2018

== Group B ==
=== Argentina ===
Argentina women's national basketball team - 2018 FIBA Women's Basketball World Cup roster
Players
Coaches

| Pos. | No. | Name | Age – Date of birth | Height | Club | Ctr. |
|---|---|---|---|---|---|---|
| G | 4 | Macarena Rosset | 27 – 23 February 1991 | 1.78 m (5 ft 10 in) | San Giovanni Valdarno | (Italy) |
| G | 5 | Macarena D'Urso | 26 – 16 December 1991 | 1.62 m (5 ft 4 in) | CB Almeria | (Spain) |
| F | 6 | Victoria Llorente | 22 – 5 June 1996 | 1.80 m (5 ft 11 in) | Bembibre | (Spain) |
| F | 8 | Andrea Boquete | 27 – 24 September 1990 | 1.83 m (6 ft 0 in) | Obras Basket | (Argentina) |
| F | 9 | Celia Fiorotto | 26 – 2 June 1992 | 1.86 m (6 ft 1 in) | Berazategui | (Argentina) |
| C | 10 | Agostina Burani | 26 – 4 October 1991 | 1.86 m (6 ft 1 in) | Union Florida | (Argentina) |
| G | 11 | Melisa Gretter | 25 – 24 January 1993 | 1.67 m (5 ft 6 in) | Union Florida | (Argentina) |
| F/C | 12 | Ornella Santana | 28 – 17 September 1990 | 1.80 m (5 ft 11 in) | CB Almeria | (Spain) |
| G | 13 | Debora González | 28 – 10 January 1990 | 1.70 m (5 ft 7 in) | Napoli | (Italy) |
| C | 15 | Mara Marchizotti | 24 – 16 June 1994 | 1.92 m (6 ft 4 in) | Rocamora | (Argentina) |
| F/C | 17 | Mayra Leiva | 22 – 17 August 1996 | 1.85 m (6 ft 1 in) | Presidente Venceslau | (Brazil) |
| G/F | 22 | Natacha Pérez | 27 – 30 March 1991 | 1.76 m (5 ft 9 in) | Las Heras Mendoza | (Argentina) |

Head coach

- (Argentina) Christian Santander

Assistant coach(es)

- (Argentina) Sebastian Silva
- (Argentina) Juan Ferreira Martinez

Legend

- Club – describes last
  club before the tournament
- Age – describes age
  on 22 September 2018

=== Australia ===
Australia women's national basketball team - 2018 FIBA Women's Basketball World Cup roster
Players
Coaches

| Pos. | No. | Name | Age – Date of birth | Height | Club |
|---|---|---|---|---|---|---|
| G/F | 4 | Jenna O'Hea (C) | 31 – 6 June 1987 | 1.86 m (6 ft 1 in) | Melbourne Boomers | (Australia) |
| G | 6 | Stephanie Talbot | 24 – 15 June 1994 | 1.88 m (6 ft 2 in) | Phoenix Mercury | (United States) |
| G/F | 7 | Tess Madgen | 28 – 12 August 1990 | 1.80 m (5 ft 11 in) | Townsville Fire | (Australia) |
| C | 8 | Liz Cambage | 27 – 18 August 1991 | 2.03 m (6 ft 8 in) | Dallas Wings | (United States) |
| G | 9 | Rebecca Allen | 25 – 6 November 1992 | 1.86 m (6 ft 1 in) | New York Liberty | (United States) |
| G | 10 | Katie-Rae Ebzery | 28 – 1 August 1990 | 1.78 m (5 ft 10 in) | Perth Lynx | (Australia) |
| F | 11 | Alanna Smith | 22 – 10 September 1996 | 1.91 m (6 ft 3 in) | Stanford Cardinal | (United States) |
| F/C | 12 | Alex Bunton | 24 – 13 October 1993 | 1.96 m (6 ft 5 in) | Sydney Uni Flames | (Australia) |
| F | 13 | Ezi Magbegor | 19 – 13 August 1999 | 1.93 m (6 ft 4 in) | Melbourne Boomers | (Australia) |
| G | 14 | Tessa Lavey | 25 – 29 March 1993 | 1.72 m (5 ft 8 in) | Dandenong Rangers | (Australia) |
| C | 15 | Cayla George | 29 – 1 May 1989 | 1.94 m (6 ft 4 in) | Dallas Wings | (United States) |
| G | 32 | Sami Whitcomb | 30 – 20 July 1988 | 1.78 m (5 ft 10 in) | Seattle Storm | (United States) |

Head coach

- (Australia) Sandy Brondello

Assistant coach(es)

- (Australia) Cheryl Chambers
- (Australia) Paul Goriss
- (Australia) Chris Lucas

Legend

- Club – describes last
  club before the tournament
- Age – describes age
  on 22 September 2018

=== Nigeria ===
Nigeria women's national basketball team – 2018 FIBA Women's Basketball World Cup roster
Players
Coaches

| Pos. | No. | Name | Age – Date of birth | Height | Club | Ctr. |
|---|---|---|---|---|---|---|
| G | 7 | Sarah Ogoke | 28 – 25 June 1990 | 1.75 m (5 ft 9 in) | CB Vigo | (Spain) |
| G | 8 | Nkechi Akashili | 28 – 22 February 1990 | 1.70 m (5 ft 7 in) | First Bank | (Nigeria) |
| F | 9 | Aisha Mohammed | 32 – 21 October 1985 | 1.93 m (6 ft 4 in) | İstanbul Üniversitesi | (Turkey) |
| G | 10 | Promise Amukamara | 25 – 22 June 1993 | 1.70 m (5 ft 7 in) | CSM Satu Mare | (Romania) |
| F | 11 | Adaora Elonu (C) | 28 – 28 April 1990 | 1.83 m (6 ft 0 in) | CB Avenida | (Spain) |
| C | 12 | Elo Edeferioka | 25 – 10 April 1993 | 1.90 m (6 ft 3 in) | CB Vigo | (Spain) |
| C | 13 | Evelyn Akhator | 23 – 3 February 1995 | 1.80 m (5 ft 11 in) | Beşiktaş | (Turkey) |
| F | 17 | Nkem Akaraiwe | 21 – 22 December 1996 | 1.83 m (6 ft 0 in) | First Bank | (Nigeria) |
| F | 21 | Atonye Nyingifa | 27 – 8 December 1990 | 1.83 m (6 ft 0 in) | Porta XI Ensino | (Spain) |
| G | 23 | Ezinne Kalu | 26 – 26 June 1992 | 1.73 m (5 ft 8 in) | Vasas Akademia | (Hungary) |
| F | 24 | Sarah Imovbioh | 26 – 24 May 1992 | 1.88 m (6 ft 2 in) | PEAC-Pécs | (Hungary) |
| G | 30 | Cecilia Okoye | 27 – 13 September 1991 | 1.85 m (6 ft 1 in) | PBC Tirana | (Albania) |

Head coach

- (United States) Otis Hughley Jr.

Assistant coach(es)

- (Nigeria) Peter Ahmedu
- (Nigeria) Shola Ogunade Shomala

Legend

- Club – describes last
  club before the tournament
- Age – describes age
  on 22 September 2018

=== Turkey ===
Turkey women's national basketball team - 2018 FIBA Women's Basketball World Cup roster
Players
Coaches

| Pos. | No. | Name | Age – Date of birth | Height | Club |
|---|---|---|---|---|---|---|
| G | 0 | Asena Yalçın | 27 – 4 April 1991 | 1.98 m (6 ft 6 in) | Mersin BSB | (Turkey) |
| G | 3 | Ayşe Cora | 25 – 3 March 1993 | 1.75 m (5 ft 9 in) | Fenerbahçe | (Turkey) |
| G | 4 | Olcay Çakır Turgut | 25 – 13 July 1993 | 1.82 m (6 ft 0 in) | Yakın Doğu Üniversitesi | (Turkey) |
| F | 7 | Cansu Köksal | 24 – 28 April 1994 | 1.87 m (6 ft 2 in) | Galatasaray | (Turkey) |
| F | 9 | Bahar Çağlar | 29 – 28 September 1988 | 1.91 m (6 ft 3 in) | Yakın Doğu Üniversitesi | (Turkey) |
| G | 10 | Işıl Alben (C) | 32 – 11 February 1986 | 1.73 m (5 ft 8 in) | Galatasaray | (Turkey) |
| F | 12 | Tuğçe Canıtez | 27 – 10 November 1990 | 1.90 m (6 ft 3 in) | Fenerbahçe | (Turkey) |
| C | 13 | Quanitra Hollingsworth | 29 – 15 November 1988 | 1.98 m (6 ft 6 in) | Yakın Doğu Üniversitesi | (Turkey) |
| F | 15 | Tilbe Şenyürek | 23 – 26 April 1995 | 1.89 m (6 ft 2 in) | Fenerbahçe | (Turkey) |
| G | 23 | Merve Aydın | 24 – 10 March 1994 | 1.78 m (5 ft 10 in) | Hatay BSB | (Turkey) |
| F | 28 | İlayda Güner | 18 – 5 November 1999 | 1.90 m (6 ft 3 in) | İstanbul Üniversitesi | (Turkey) |
| C | 33 | Esra Ural Topuz | 27 – 18 August 1991 | 1.98 m (6 ft 6 in) | Fenerbahçe | (Turkey) |

Head coach

- (Turkey) Ekrem Memnun

Assistant coach(es)

- (Turkey) Aziz Akkaya
- (Turkey) Emre Vatansever

Legend

- Club – describes last
  club before the tournament
- Age – describes age
  on 22 September 2018

== Group C ==
=== Belgium ===
Belgium women's national basketball team – 2018 FIBA Women's Basketball World Cup roster
Players
Coaches

| Pos. | No. | Name | Age – Date of birth | Height | Club | Ctr. |
|---|---|---|---|---|---|---|
| G | 5 | Kim Mestdagh | 28 – 12 March 1990 | 1.78 m (5 ft 10 in) | Perfumerías Avenida | (Spain) |
| F | 6 | Antonia Delaere | 24 – 1 August 1994 | 1.80 m (5 ft 11 in) | Castors Braine | (Belgium) |
| F | 8 | Hatty Nawezhi | 24 – 7 September 1994 | 1.86 m (6 ft 1 in) | Rioja ISB | (Spain) |
| G | 9 | Marjorie Carpréaux | 31 – 17 September 1987 | 1.61 m (5 ft 3 in) | Declercq Stortbeton Waregem | (Belgium) |
| C | 11 | Emma Meesseman | 25 – 13 May 1993 | 1.92 m (6 ft 4 in) | UMMC Ekaterinburg | (Russia) |
| C | 12 | Ann Wauters | 37 – 12 October 1980 | 1.94 m (6 ft 4 in) | Yakın Doğu Üniversitesi | (Turkey) |
| C | 13 | Kyara Linskens | 21 – 13 November 1996 | 1.85 m (6 ft 1 in) | Namur-Capitale | (Belgium) |
| G/F | 22 | Hanne Mestdagh | 25 – 19 April 1993 | 1.78 m (5 ft 10 in) | Namur-Capitale | (Belgium) |
| F | 32 | Heleen Nauwelaers | 22 – 14 March 1996 | 1.80 m (5 ft 11 in) | Sint-Katelijne | (Belgium) |
| G | 35 | Julie Vanloo | 25 – 10 February 1993 | 1.68 m (5 ft 6 in) | ASVEL | (France) |
| F | 42 | Jana Raman | 27 – 15 February 1991 | 1.87 m (6 ft 2 in) | Kangoeroes Mechelen | (Belgium) |
| G | 55 | Julie Allemand | 22 – 7 July 1996 | 1.74 m (5 ft 9 in) | ASVEL | (France) |

Head coach

- (Belgium) Philip Mestdagh

Assistant coach(es)

- (Belgium) Pierre Cornia

Legend

- Club – describes last
  club before the tournament
- Age – describes age
  on 22 September 2018

=== Japan ===
Japan women's national basketball team – 2018 FIBA Women's Basketball World Cup roster
Players
Coaches

| Pos. | No. | Name | Age – Date of birth | Height | Club |
|---|---|---|---|---|---|---|
| F | 0 | Moeko Nagaoka | 24 – 29 December 1993 | 1.82 m (6 ft 0 in) | Toyota Antelopes | (Japan) |
| G | 1 | Manami Fujioka | 24 – 1 February 1994 | 1.70 m (5 ft 7 in) | JX-Eneos Sunflowers | (Japan) |
| G | 7 | Saki Mizushima | 27 – 24 April 1991 | 1.71 m (5 ft 7 in) | Toyota Antelopes | (Japan) |
| F/C | 8 | Maki Takada | 29 – 23 August 1989 | 1.83 m (6 ft 0 in) | Denso Iris | (Japan) |
| G | 13 | Rui Machida | 25 – 8 March 1993 | 1.61 m (5 ft 3 in) | Fujitsu Red Wave | (Japan) |
| G | 15 | Nako Motohashi | 24 – 10 October 1993 | 1.64 m (5 ft 5 in) | Haneda Vickies | (Japan) |
| F | 24 | Mika Fujitaka | 29 – 14 May 1989 | 1.78 m (5 ft 10 in) | Toyota Antelopes | (Japan) |
| F/C | 30 | Evelyn Mawuli | 23 – 2 June 1995 | 1.80 m (5 ft 11 in) | Toyota Antelopes | (Japan) |
| G | 41 | Haruno Nemoto | 23 – 18 April 1995 | 1.75 m (5 ft 9 in) | Mitsubishi Electric Koalas | (Japan) |
| F | 52 | Yuki Miyazawa | 25 – 2 June 1993 | 1.81 m (5 ft 11 in) | JX-Eneos Sunflowers | (Japan) |
| C | 88 | Himawari Akaho | 20 – 28 August 1998 | 1.81 m (5 ft 11 in) | Denso Iris | (Japan) |
| F/C | 99 | Monica Okoye | 19 – 7 February 1999 | 1.81 m (5 ft 11 in) | Denso Iris | (Japan) |

Head coach

- (United States) Tom Hovasse

Assistant coach(es)

- (Japan) Takehiko Chibana
- (Japan) Toru Ontsuka
- (Japan) Masahiro Takahashi

Legend

- Club – describes last
  club before the tournament
- Age – describes age
  on 22 September 2018

=== Puerto Rico ===
Puerto Rico women's national basketball team - 2018 FIBA Women's Basketball World Cup roster
Players
Coaches

| Pos. | No. | Name | Age – Date of birth | Height | Club | Ctr. |
|---|---|---|---|---|---|---|
| G | 0 | Jennifer O'Neill | 28 – 19 April 1990 | 1.65 m (5 ft 5 in) | Spartak Moscow | (Russia) |
| F | 2 | Tayra Meléndez | 24 – 29 October 1993 | 1.98 m (6 ft 6 in) | Santeras de Aguada | (Puerto Rico) |
| F | 3 | Anushka Maldonado | 22 – 29 September 1995 | 1.85 m (6 ft 1 in) |
| G | 5 | Pamela Rosado | 32 – 30 April 1986 | 1.65 m (5 ft 5 in) | Montañeras de Morovis | (Puerto Rico) |
| G/F | 9 | Allison Gibson | 25 – 27 March 1993 | 1.80 m (5 ft 11 in) | Santeras de Aguada | (Puerto Rico) |
| G | 11 | Michelle González | 29 – 3 August 1989 | 1.67 m (5 ft 6 in) | Montañeras de Morovis | (Puerto Rico) |
| G | 12 | Dayshalee Salamán | 28 – 17 August 1990 | 1.63 m (5 ft 4 in) | Obras Sanitarias | (Argentina) |
| F | 14 | Mari Plácido | 31 – 17 August 1987 | 1.81 m (5 ft 11 in) | Santeras de Aguada | (Puerto Rico) |
| G | 22 | Ashley Pérez | 24 – 12 February 1994 | 1.73 m (5 ft 8 in) |
| F/C | 23 | Yolanda Jones | 34 – 6 March 1984 | 1.84 m (6 ft 0 in) | Gigantes de Carolina | (Puerto Rico) |
| G/F | 24 | Jazmon Gwathmey | 25 – January 24, 1993 | 1.88 m (6 ft 2 in) | Lointek Gernika Bizkaia | (Spain) |
| F/C | 25 | Isalys Quiñones | 20 – 23 October 1997 | 1.90 m (6 ft 3 in) | Dartmouth Big Green | (United States) |

Head coach

- (Puerto Rico) Jerry Batista

Assistant coach(es)

- (Puerto Rico) Daniel Ortiz
- (Puerto Rico) Carlos Calcaño
- (Puerto Rico) José Ruiz

Legend

- Club – describes last
  club before the tournament
- Age – describes age
  on 22 September 2018

=== Spain ===
Spain women's national basketball team – 2018 FIBA Women's Basketball World Cup roster
Players
Coaches
}

| Pos. | No. | Name | Age – Date of birth | Height | Club | Ctr. |
|---|---|---|---|---|---|---|
| C | 4 | Laura Nicholls | 29 – 26 February 1989 | 1.90 m (6 ft 3 in) | Perfumerías Avenida | (Spain) |
| PG | 5 | Cristina Ouviña | 28 – 18 September 1990 | 1.75 m (5 ft 9 in) | Tango Bourges Basket | (France) |
| PG | 6 | Sílvia Domínguez | 31 – 31 January 1987 | 1.68 m (5 ft 6 in) | Perfumerías Avenida | (Spain) |
| SF | 7 | Alba Torrens | 29 – 30 August 1989 | 1.91 m (6 ft 3 in) | UMMC Ekaterinburg | (Russia) |
| PG | 9 | Laia Palau | 39 – 10 September 1979 | 1.80 m (5 ft 11 in) | Tango Bourges Basket | (France) |
| SF | 10 | Marta Xargay | 27 – 20 December 1990 | 1.82 m (6 ft 0 in) | USK Praha | (Czech Republic) |
| SG | 15 | Anna Cruz | 31 – 27 October 1986 | 1.78 m (5 ft 10 in) | Dynamo Kursk | (Russia) |
| SG | 18 | Queralt Casas | 25 – 18 November 1992 | 1.75 m (5 ft 9 in) | Landes | (France) |
| SF | 19 | Belén Arrojo | 23 – 8 January 1995 | 1.88 m (6 ft 2 in) | Femení Sant Adrià | (Spain) |
| C | 24 | Laura Gil | 26 – 24 April 1992 | 1.91 m (6 ft 3 in) | Perfumerías Avenida | (Spain) |
| C | 28 | Beatriz Sánchez | 28 – 20 December 1989 | 1.90 m (6 ft 3 in) | Universitario de Ferrol | (Spain) |
| C | 45 | Astou Ndour | 24 – 23 August 1994 | 1.95 m (6 ft 5 in) | Chicago Sky | (United States) |

Head coach

- (Spain) Lucas Mondelo

Assistant coach(es)

- (Spain) Víctor Lapeña
- (Spain) Isabel Sánchez

Legend

- Club – describes last
  club before the tournament
- Age – describes age
  on 22 September 2018

== Group D ==
=== China ===
China women's national basketball team – 2018 FIBA Women's Basketball World Cup roster
Players
Coaches

| Pos. | No. | Name | Age – Date of birth | Height | Club |
|---|---|---|---|---|---|---|
| G | 3 | Yang Liwei | 23 – 2 January 1995 | 1.76 m (5 ft 9 in) | Guangdong Dolphins | (China) |
| G | 4 | Li Yuan | 18 – 29 May 2000 | 1.70 m (5 ft 7 in) | Shandong Six Stars | (China) |
| G | 5 | Wang Siyu | 22 – 16 October 1995 | 1.80 m (5 ft 11 in) | Shandong Six Stars | (China) |
| F | 7 | Shao Ting (C) | 28 – 10 December 1989 | 1.80 m (5 ft 11 in) | Beijing Great Wall | (China) |
| F | 8 | Wang Xuemeng | 24 – 20 October 1993 | 1.84 m (6 ft 0 in) | Bayi Kylin | (China) |
| G | 9 | Li Meng | 23 – 2 January 1995 | 1.83 m (6 ft 0 in) | Bayi Kylin | (China) |
| F | 10 | Ma Xueya | 24 – 16 December 1993 | 1.87 m (6 ft 2 in) | Shanxi Flame | (China) |
| F | 11 | Huang Sijing | 22 – 8 January 1996 | 1.90 m (6 ft 3 in) | Guangdong Dolphins | (China) |
| C | 12 | Liu Jiacen | 29 – 30 March 1989 | 1.90 m (6 ft 3 in) | Heilongjiang Dragons | (China) |
| C | 13 | Sun Mengran | 26 – 16 July 1992 | 1.97 m (6 ft 6 in) | Bayi Kylin | (China) |
| C | 14 | Li Yueru | 19 – 28 March 1999 | 2.00 m (6 ft 7 in) | Guangdong Dolphins | (China) |
| C | 15 | Han Xu | 18 – 31 October 1999 | 2.05 m (6 ft 9 in) | Xinjiang Magic Deer | (China) |

Head coach

- (China) Xu Limin

Assistant coach(es)

- (China) Jia Nan
- (China) Zheng Wei

Legend

- Club – describes last
  club before the tournament
- Age – describes age
  on 22 September 2018

=== Latvia ===
Latvia women's national basketball team – 2018 FIBA Women's Basketball World Cup roster
Players
Coaches

| Pos. | No. | Name | Age – Date of birth | Height | Club | Ctr. |
|---|---|---|---|---|---|---|
| F | 0 | Dita Rozenberga | 25 – 22 December 1992 | 1.80 m (5 ft 11 in) | TTT Rīga | (Latvia) |
| G | 7 | Elīna Dikaioulaku | 29 – 24 April 1989 | 1.72 m (5 ft 8 in) | Ślęza Wrocław | (Poland) |
| F | 8 | Gunta Baško | 38 – 27 April 1980 | 1.81 m (5 ft 11 in) | TTT Rīga | (Latvia) |
| F/C | 11 | Aija Putniņa | 30 – 15 January 1988 | 1.90 m (6 ft 3 in) | CB Avenida | (Spain) |
| F | 12 | Anete Šteinberga | 28 – 29 January 1990 | 1.90 m (6 ft 3 in) | Venezia | (Italy) |
| C | 13 | Aija Brumermane | 31 – 17 October 1986 | 1.91 m (6 ft 3 in) | TTT Rīga | (Latvia) |
| G | 15 | Ieva Pulvere | 28 – 22 July 1990 | 1.72 m (5 ft 8 in) | TTT Rīga | (Latvia) |
| F/C | 28 | Kristīne Vītola | 27 – 2 June 1991 | 1.96 m (6 ft 5 in) | TTT Rīga | (Latvia) |
| G/F | 33 | Kitija Laksa | 22 – 21 May 1996 | 1.84 m (6 ft 0 in) | South Florida Bulls | (United States) |
| G/F | 35 | Kate Krēsliņa | 22 – 14 April 1996 | 1.84 m (6 ft 0 in) | TTT Rīga | (Latvia) |
| G | 44 | Baiba Eglīte | 29 – 9 January 1989 | 1.76 m (5 ft 9 in) | TTT Rīga | (Latvia) |
| F | 45 | Digna Strautmane | 20 – 18 September 1998 | 1.88 m (6 ft 2 in) | Syracuse Orange | (United States) |

Head coach

- (Latvia) Mārtiņš Zībarts

Assistant coach(es)

- (Latvia) Guntis Endzels
- (Latvia) Aigars Nerips

Legend

- Club – describes last
  club before the tournament
- Age – describes age
  on 22 September 2018

=== Senegal ===
Senegal women's national basketball team – 2018 FIBA Women's Basketball World Cup roster
Players
Coaches

| Pos. | No. | Name | Age – Date of birth | Height | Club | Ctr. |
|---|---|---|---|---|---|---|
| G | 1 | Ndeye Dieng | 23 – 1 December 1994 | 1.78 m (5 ft 10 in) |
| G | 4 | Oumoul Thiam | 28 – 3 February 1990 | 1.79 m (5 ft 10 in) | Santa Maria | (Ecuador) |
| C | 6 | Oumoul Sarr | 34 – 25 January 1984 | 1.90 m (6 ft 3 in) | Santa Maria | (Ecuador) |
| G | 7 | Bintou Diémé | 34 – 1 February 1984 | 1.67 m (5 ft 6 in) | Hainaut Saint-Amand | (France) |
| G | 8 | Mame Diodio Diouf | 33 – 15 December 1984 | 1.70 m (5 ft 7 in) | Spar Gran Canaria | (Spain) |
| F | 10 | Astou Traoré (C) | 37 – 30 April 1981 | 1.86 m (6 ft 1 in) | Uni Girona CB | (Spain) |
| C | 11 | Maimouna Diarra | 27 – 30 January 1991 | 1.98 m (6 ft 6 in) | CD Zamarat | (Spain) |
| C | 12 | Mame-Marie Sy | 33 – 25 March 1985 | 1.88 m (6 ft 2 in) | ESB Villeneuve-d'Ascq | (France) |
| F | 24 | Yacine Diop | 23 – 18 June 1995 | 1.78 m (5 ft 10 in) | Pittsburgh Panthers | (United States) |
| F/C | 35 | Aminata Fall | 27 – 13 August 1991 | 1.93 m (6 ft 4 in) | Geneve Basket | (Switzerland) |
| | 77 | Ndèye Fatou Ndiaye | 24 – 21 July 1994 |
| C | 84 | Aicha Sidibe | 22 – 3 December 1995 |

Head coach

- (Senegal) Cheikh Sarr

Assistant coach(es)

- (Senegal) Parfaito Adjivon
- (Senegal) Khady Diop

Legend

- Club – describes last
  club before the tournament
- Age – describes age
  on 22 September 2018

=== United States ===
United States women's national basketball team – 2018 FIBA Women's Basketball World Cup roster
Players
Coaches

| Pos. | No. | Name | Age – Date of birth | Height | Club |
|---|---|---|---|---|---|---|
| G | 4 | Jewell Loyd | 24 – 5 October 1993 | 1.78 m (5 ft 10 in) | Seattle Storm | (United States) |
| G | 5 | Kelsey Plum | 24 – 24 August 1994 | 1.73 m (5 ft 8 in) | Las Vegas Aces | (United States) |
| G | 6 | Sue Bird | 37 – 16 October 1980 | 1.75 m (5 ft 9 in) | Seattle Storm | (United States) |
| G | 7 | Layshia Clarendon | 27 – 2 May 1991 | 1.75 m (5 ft 9 in) | Connecticut Sun | (United States) |
| F | 8 | Morgan Tuck | 24 – 30 April 1994 | 1.88 m (6 ft 2 in) | Connecticut Sun | (United States) |
| F | 9 | A'ja Wilson | 22 – 8 August 1996 | 1.96 m (6 ft 5 in) | Las Vegas Aces | (United States) |
| F/C | 10 | Breanna Stewart | 24 – 27 August 1994 | 1.93 m (6 ft 4 in) | Seattle Storm | (United States) |
| F | 11 | Elena Delle Donne | 29 – 5 September 1989 | 1.96 m (6 ft 5 in) | Washington Mystics | (United States) |
| G | 12 | Diana Taurasi | 36 – 11 June 1982 | 1.83 m (6 ft 0 in) | Phoenix Mercury | (United States) |
| F | 13 | Nneka Ogwumike | 28 – 2 July 1990 | 1.88 m (6 ft 2 in) | Los Angeles Sparks | (United States) |
| C | 14 | Tina Charles | 29 – 5 December 1988 | 1.93 m (6 ft 4 in) | New York Liberty | (United States) |
| C | 15 | Brittney Griner | 27 – 18 October 1990 | 2.06 m (6 ft 9 in) | Phoenix Mercury | (United States) |

Head coach

- (United States) Dawn Staley

Assistant coach(es)

- (United States) Dan Hughes
- (United States) Cheryl Reeve
- (United States) Jennifer Rizzotti

Legend

- Club – describes last
  club before the tournament
- Age – describes age
  on 22 September 2018
