= EuroBasket Women 2023 squads =

This article displays the rosters for the teams competing at the EuroBasket Women 2023. Each team had to submit 12 players.

== Group A ==
=== Greece ===
A 16-player roster was announced on 4 May. The final squad was revealed on 12 June.

Greece women's national basketball team roster
Players
Coaches

Pos.	No.	Name	Age – Date of birth	Height	Club	Ctr.
PG	4	Anna Niki Stamolamprou	27 – 26 August 1995	1.70 m (5 ft 7 in)	Olympiacos	(Greece)
F	5	Eleni Bosgana	19 – 4 December 2003	1.88 m (6 ft 2 in)	Stanford Cardinal	(United States)
PG	6	Dionysia Alexandri	33 – 24 October 1989	1.70 m (5 ft 7 in)	Panathinaikos	(Greece)
PG	8	Pinelopi Pavlopoulou	27 – 3 March 1996	1.72 m (5 ft 8 in)	Panathinaikos	(Greece)
G	10	Elena Tsineke	23 – 11 July 1999	1.76 m (5 ft 9 in)	Gorzów Wielkopolski	(Poland)
PF	12	Katerina Sotiriou (C)	39 – 3 January 1984	1.86 m (6 ft 1 in)	Panathinaikos	(Greece)
PF	15	Artemis Spanou	30 – 1 January 1993	1.86 m (6 ft 1 in)	Tango Bourges Basket	(France)
SF	21	Eleanna Christinaki	26 – 16 December 1996	1.84 m (6 ft 0 in)	Olympiacos	(Greece)
SG	26	Ioanna Diela	33 – 2 June 1990	1.81 m (5 ft 11 in)	Olympiacos	(Greece)
C	34	Mariella Fasoula	25 – 2 September 1997	1.92 m (6 ft 4 in)	CB Avenida	(Spain)
SF	44	Zafeirenia Karlafti	25 – 8 June 1998	1.82 m (6 ft 0 in)	Olympiacos	(Greece)
SG	55	Evdokia Stamati	38 – 2 August 1984	1.78 m (5 ft 10 in)	Olympiacos	(Greece)

Head coach

- (Greece) Petros Prekas

Assistant coach(es)

- (Greece) Dimitra Kalentzou
- (Greece) Georgios Tsemperis

Legend

- (C) Team captain
- Club – describes last
  club before the tournament
- Age – describes age
  on 15 June 2023

=== Latvia ===
A 19-player roster was announced on 2 May. It was reduced to 14 players on 28 May. The final squad was revealed on 14 June.

Latvia women's national basketball team roster roster
Players
Coaches

Pos.	No.	Name	Age – Date of birth	Height	Club	Ctr.
PF	4	Paula Strautmane	26 – 23 March 1997	1.85 m (6 ft 1 in)	AE Sedis Bàsquet	(Spain)
SG	6	Ketija Vihmane	22 – 5 March 2001	1.69 m (5 ft 7 in)	Saarlouis Royals	(Germany)
PF	10	Karlīne Pilābere	32 – 16 November 1990	1.86 m (6 ft 1 in)	Alma Basket Patti	(Italy)
PF	11	Aija Jurjāne	35 – 15 January 1988	1.90 m (6 ft 3 in)	Galatasaray	(Turkey)
C	12	Anete Šteinberga (C)	33 – 29 January 1990	1.90 m (6 ft 3 in)	Tango Bourges Basket	(France)
SG	15	Ieva Pulvere	32 – 22 July 1990	1.72 m (5 ft 8 in)	Galatasaray	(Turkey)
PG	16	Ilze Jākobsone	29 – 19 April 1994	1.68 m (5 ft 6 in)	TTT Riga	(Latvia)
F	21	Vanesa Jasa	19 – 9 July 2003	1.78 m (5 ft 10 in)	TTT Riga	(Latvia)
PF	23	Aleksa Gulbe	23 – 5 February 2000	1.86 m (6 ft 1 in)	CB Avenida	(Spain)
C	25	Marta Miščenko	27 – 27 November 1995	1.96 m (6 ft 5 in)	TTT Riga	(Latvia)
SF	33	Kitija Laksa	27 – 21 May 1996	1.86 m (6 ft 1 in)	Virtus Bologna	(Italy)
SF	35	Kate Krēsliņa	27 – 14 April 1996	1.84 m (6 ft 0 in)	TTT Riga	(Latvia)

Head coach

- (Latvia) Gundars Vētra

Assistant coach(es)

- (Latvia) Mārtiņš Zībarts
- (Latvia) Ainars Zvirgzdiņš

Legend

- (C) Team captain
- Club – describes last
  club before the tournament
- Age – describes age
  on 15 June 2023

=== Montenegro ===
A 17-player roster was announced on 9 May. On 29 May, Jelena Dubljević withdrew due to an injury. The final squad was revealed on 12 June.

Montenegro women's national basketball team roster
Players
Coaches

Pos.	No.	Name	Age – Date of birth	Height	Club	Ctr.
C	2	Natasha Mack	25 – 3 November 1997	1.93 m (6 ft 4 in)	AZS UMCS Lublin	(Poland)
PF	3	Bojana Kovačević	26 – 16 October 1996	1.86 m (6 ft 1 in)	AE Sedis Bàsquet	(Spain)
PG	4	Sofija Živaljević	25 – 24 December 1997	1.76 m (5 ft 9 in)	Arka Gdynia	(Poland)
F	5	Jovana Pašić	31 – 12 May 1992	1.83 m (6 ft 0 in)	ASA Jerusalem	(Israel)
SG	7	Zorana Radonjić	21 – 13 June 2002	1.73 m (5 ft 8 in)	ŽKK Budućnost Podgorica	(Montenegro)
SG	8	Dragana Živković	22 – 23 January 2001	1.79 m (5 ft 10 in)	ŽKK Budućnost Podgorica	(Montenegro)
PG	11	Božica Mujović	27 – 7 January 1996	1.76 m (5 ft 9 in)	Slávia Banská Bystrica	(Slovakia)
C	21	Maja Bigović	20 – 24 September 2002	1.95 m (6 ft 5 in)	ŽKK Budućnost Podgorica	(Montenegro)
SG	23	Jelena Vučetić	29 – 14 September 1993	1.82 m (6 ft 0 in)	BC Castors Braine	(Belgium)
PF	24	Ksenija Šćepanović	20 – 21 December 2002	1.91 m (6 ft 3 in)	ŽKK Budućnost Podgorica	(Montenegro)
PG	25	Marija Leković	19 – 21 July 2003	1.66 m (5 ft 5 in)	ŽKK Budućnost Podgorica	(Montenegro)
F	35	Milica Jovanović (C)	33 – 14 August 1989	1.89 m (6 ft 2 in)	Diósgyőri VTK	(Hungary)

Head coach

- (Montenegro) Jelena Škerović

Assistant coach(es)

- (Poland) Arkadiusz Rusin
- (Montenegro) Miroslav Škara

Legend

- (C) Team captain
- Club – describes last
  club before the tournament
- Age – describes age
  on 15 June 2023

=== Spain ===
A 17-player roster was announced on 3 May. On 5 June, the group was reduced to 13-players. The final squad was revealed on 11 June.

Spain women's national basketball team roster
Players
Coaches

Pos.	No.	Name	Age – Date of birth	Height	Club	Ctr.
PG	5	Cristina Ouviña	32 – 18 September 1990	1.73 m (5 ft 8 in)	Valencia Basket	(Spain)
G	6	Silvia Domínguez (C)	36 – 31 January 1987	1.65 m (5 ft 5 in)	CB Avenida	(Spain)
SF	7	Alba Torrens	33 – 30 August 1989	1.92 m (6 ft 4 in)	Valencia Basket	(Spain)
SF	9	Queralt Casas	30 – 18 November 1992	1.80 m (5 ft 11 in)	Valencia Basket	(Spain)
SG	11	Leonor Rodríguez	31 – 21 October 1991	1.80 m (5 ft 11 in)	CB Avenida	(Spain)
PG	12	Maite Cazorla	25 – 18 June 1997	1.78 m (5 ft 10 in)	USK Praha	(Czech Republic)
C	14	Raquel Carrera	21 – 31 October 2001	1.90 m (6 ft 3 in)	Valencia Basket	(Spain)
C	20	Paula Ginzo	25 – 16 February 1998	1.89 m (6 ft 2 in)	CB Santfeliuenc	(Spain)
C	21	Lola Pendande	23 – 29 March 2000	1.89 m (6 ft 2 in)	CB Santfeliuenc	(Spain)
SF	22	María Conde	26 – 14 January 1997	1.86 m (6 ft 1 in)	USK Praha	(Czech Republic)
PF	24	Laura Gil	31 – 24 April 1992	1.90 m (6 ft 3 in)	CB Avenida	(Spain)
SF	33	Laura Quevedo	27 – 15 April 1996	1.83 m (6 ft 0 in)	ASVEL Basket	(France)

Head coach

- (Spain) Miguel Méndez

Assistant coach(es)

- (Spain) Luis Rey
- (Spain) Madelen Urieta

Legend

- (C) Team captain
- Club – describes last
  club before the tournament
- Age – describes age
  on 15 June 2023

== Group B ==
=== Belgium ===
A 19-player roster was announced on 28 April. The final squad was revealed on 9 June.

Belgium women's national basketball team roster
Players
Coaches

Pos.	No.	Name	Age – Date of birth	Height	Club	Ctr.
PG	4	Elise Ramette	24 – 3 November 1998	1.77 m (5 ft 10 in)	AE Sedis Bàsquet	(Spain)
SF	6	Antonia Delaere	28 – 1 August 1994	1.82 m (6 ft 0 in)	CB Avenida	(Spain)
SF	10	Laure Résimont	25 – 29 January 1998	1.85 m (6 ft 1 in)	Kangoeroes Basket Mechelen	(Belgium)
PF	11	Emma Meesseman (C)	30 – 13 May 1993	1.93 m (6 ft 4 in)	Fenerbahçe	(Turkey)
C	13	Kyara Linskens	26 – 13 November 1996	1.93 m (6 ft 4 in)	Lattes Montpellier	(France)
SF	22	Bethy Mununga	25 – 22 July 1997	1.83 m (6 ft 0 in)	ACS Sepsi SIC	(Romania)
C	23	Serena-Lynn Geldof	26 – 2 March 1997	1.96 m (6 ft 5 in)	Basket Zaragoza	(Spain)
C	25	Becky Massey	23 – 21 March 2000	1.86 m (6 ft 1 in)	IDK Euskotren	(Spain)
SF	31	Maxuelle Lisowa-Mbaka	22 – 14 May 2001	1.78 m (5 ft 10 in)	Basketball Club Lucca	(Italy)
C	34	Billie Massey	23 – 21 March 2000	1.86 m (6 ft 1 in)	CB Estudiantes	(Spain)
PG	35	Julie Vanloo	30 – 10 February 1993	1.68 m (5 ft 6 in)	Lattes Montpellier	(France)
PG	55	Julie Allemand	26 – 7 July 1996	1.74 m (5 ft 9 in)	Chicago Sky	(United States)

Head coach

- (France) Rachid Méziane

Assistant coach(es)

- (Belgium) Pascal Angills
- (Belgium) Jill Lorent

Legend

- (C) Team captain
- Club – describes last
  club before the tournament
- Age – describes age
  on 15 June 2023

=== Czech Republic ===
A 23-player roster was announced on 8 May. Julie Reisingerové withdrew on 24 May due to an injury. The final squad was revealed on 12 June.

Czech Republic women's national basketball team roster
Players
Coaches

Pos.	No.	Name	Age – Date of birth	Height	Club	Ctr.
C	0	Renáta Březinová (C)	33 – 6 January 1990	1.85 m (6 ft 1 in)	Polisportiva Galli	(Italy)
PG	1	Kateřina Zeithammerová	21 – 17 April 2002	1.60 m (5 ft 3 in)	USK Praha	(Czech Republic)
SF	4	Gabriela Andělová	27 – 21 March 1996	1.73 m (5 ft 8 in)	Piešťanské Čajky	(Slovakia)
C	5	Natálie Stoupalová	24 – 13 July 1998	1.85 m (6 ft 1 in)	BK Brno	(Czech Republic)
SF	7	Dominika Paurová	18 – 22 March 2005	1.83 m (6 ft 0 in)	Sokol HK	(Czech Republic)
SG	8	Veronika Voráčková	23 – 21 June 1999	1.80 m (5 ft 11 in)	USK Praha	(Czech Republic)
PG	10	Eliška Hamzová	22 – 10 January 2001	1.82 m (6 ft 0 in)	BK Brno	(Czech Republic)
SF	12	Tereza Vyoralová	29 – 16 January 1994	1.76 m (5 ft 9 in)	USK Praha	(Czech Republic)
SG	13	Petra Holešinská	26 – 12 March 1997	1.73 m (5 ft 8 in)	Basket Zaragoza	(Spain)
G	21	Veronika Šípová	24 – 20 March 1999	1.81 m (5 ft 11 in)	USK Praha	(Czech Republic)
PF	22	Emma Čechová	18 – 12 July 2004	1.95 m (6 ft 5 in)	BK Brno	(Czech Republic)
SF	55	Simona Sklenářová	23 – 20 May 2000	1.81 m (5 ft 11 in)	USK Praha	(Czech Republic)

Head coach

- (Czech Republic) Romana Ptáčková

Assistant coach(es)

- (Czech Republic) Petr Treml

Legend

- (C) Team captain
- Club – describes last
  club before the tournament
- Age – describes age
  on 15 June 2023

=== Israel ===
A 13-player roster was announced on 22 May. The final squad was revealed on 13 June.

Israël women's national basketball team roster
Players
Coaches

Pos.	No.	Name	Age – Date of birth	Height	Club	Ctr.
SG	1	Alyssa Baron	31 – 16 April 1992	1.76 m (5 ft 9 in)	Elitzur Ramla	(Israel)
G	4	Eden Rotberg (C)	24 – 1 July 1998	1.70 m (5 ft 7 in)	Elitzur Ramla	(Israel)
C	5	Alexandra Cohen	30 – 1 June 1993	1.96 m (6 ft 5 in)	Maccabi Bnot Ashdod	(Israel)
SG	7	Gili Eisner	21 – 6 August 2001	1.76 m (5 ft 9 in)	Maccabi Haifa	(Israel)
PG	8	Daniel Karsh	22 – 4 April 2001	1.75 m (5 ft 9 in)	Ramat-Hasharon	(Israel)
F	10	Yarden Garzon	19 – 23 November 2003	1.83 m (6 ft 0 in)	Indiana Hoosiers	(United States)
F	12	Lior Garzon	21 – 16 December 2001	1.83 m (6 ft 0 in)	Oklahoma State Cowgirls	(United States)
F	13	Eden Zipel	20 – 27 December 2002	1.83 m (6 ft 0 in)	Hapoel Rishon LeZion	(Israel)
PF	22	Tal Sahar	26 – 31 March 1997	1.82 m (6 ft 0 in)	Maccabi Bnot Ashdod	(Israel)
F	24	Daniel Raber	26 – 5 September 1996	1.83 m (6 ft 0 in)	Elitzur Holon	(Israel)
F	55	Tslil Vaturi	24 – 21 June 1998	1.74 m (5 ft 9 in)	Maccabi Ironi Ramat Gan	(Israel)
F	77	Jennie Simms	29 – 21 April 1994	1.84 m (6 ft 0 in)	Elitzur Holon	(Israel)

Head coach

- (Israel) Sharon Drucker

Assistant coach(es)

- (Israel) Netanel Dahan
- (Israel) Roee Lazare

Legend

- (C) Team captain
- Club – describes last
  club before the tournament
- Age – describes age
  on 15 June 2023

=== Italy ===
A 16-player roster was announced on 13 May. The final squad was revealed on 12 June.

Italy women's national basketball team roster
Players
Coaches

Pos.	No.	Name	Age – Date of birth	Height	Club	Ctr.
PF	0	Jasmine Keys	25 – 8 October 1997	1.87 m (6 ft 2 in)	PF Schio	(Italy)
PG	2	Matilde Villa	18 – 9 December 2004	1.70 m (5 ft 7 in)	Reyer Venezia	(Italy)
C	4	Martina Bestagno (C)	32 – 14 August 1990	1.89 m (6 ft 2 in)	PF Schio	(Italy)
SG	8	Costanza Verona	23 – 6 August 1999	1.70 m (5 ft 7 in)	PF Schio	(Italy)
SF	9	Cecilia Zandalasini	27 – 16 March 1996	1.86 m (6 ft 1 in)	Virtus Bologna	(Italy)
SG	11	Francesca Pan	26 – 27 May 1997	1.80 m (5 ft 11 in)	Reyer Venezia	(Italy)
PF	12	Valeria Trucco	23 – 1 November 1999	1.93 m (6 ft 4 in)	Geas Basket	(Italy)
C	13	Lorela Cubaj	24 – 8 January 1999	1.92 m (6 ft 4 in)	Reyer Venezia	(Italy)
PG	18	Mariella Santucci	25 – 18 June 1997	1.70 m (5 ft 7 in)	Reyer Venezia	(Italy)
SG	19	Martina Fassina	24 – 7 April 1999	1.83 m (6 ft 0 in)	Reyer Venezia	(Italy)
C	22	Olbis André	24 – 25 December 1998	1.92 m (6 ft 4 in)	Virtus Bologna	(Italy)
SF	23	Laura Spreafico	31 – 19 June 1991	1.82 m (6 ft 0 in)	Gernika KESB	(Spain)

Head coach

- (Italy) Lino Lardo

Assistant coach(es)

- (Italy) Massimo Romano
- (Italy) Cinzia Zanotti

Legend

- (C) Team captain
- Club – describes last
  club before the tournament
- Age – describes age
  on 15 June 2023

== Group C ==
=== France ===
A 15-player roster was announced on 25 May. On 27 May, Caroline Hériaud withdrew due to injury. The final squad was revealed on 10 June.

France women's national basketball team roster
Players
Coaches

Pos.	No.	Name	Age – Date of birth	Height	Club	Ctr.
SF	2	Marie-Paule Foppossi	25 – 28 January 1998	1.89 m (6 ft 2 in)	Tarbes GB	(France)
PG	4	Marine Fauthoux	22 – 23 January 2001	1.76 m (5 ft 9 in)	Basket Landes	(France)
PF	6	Alexia Chartereau	24 – 5 September 1998	1.90 m (6 ft 3 in)	ASVEL Féminin	(France)
C	7	Sandrine Gruda	35 – 25 June 1987	1.93 m (6 ft 4 in)	ASVEL Féminin	(France)
SG	10	Sarah Michel (C)	34 – 10 January 1989	1.80 m (5 ft 11 in)	Bourges Basket	(France)
SF	11	Valériane Vukosavljević	29 – 29 April 1994	1.84 m (6 ft 0 in)	USK Praha	(Czech Republic)
C	12	Iliana Rupert	21 – 12 July 2001	1.94 m (6 ft 4 in)	Virtus Bologna	(Italy)
F	13	Janelle Salaün	21 – 5 September 2001	1.88 m (6 ft 2 in)	Villeneuve d'Ascq	(France)
C	22	Marième Badiane	28 – 24 November 1994	1.90 m (6 ft 3 in)	BLMA	(France)
SG	28	Mamignan Touré	28 – 19 December 1994	1.80 m (5 ft 11 in)	BLMA	(France)
G	42	Leïla Lacan	19 – 2 June 2004	1.81 m (5 ft 11 in)	Angers UFAB 49	(France)
PG	47	Romane Bernies	29 – 27 June 1993	1.70 m (5 ft 7 in)	BLMA	(France)

Head coach

- (France) Jean-Aimé Toupane

Assistant coach(es)

- (France) David Gautier
- (France) Catherine Melain

Legend

- (C) Team captain
- Club – describes last
  club before the tournament
- Age – describes age
  on 15 June 2023

=== Germany ===
A 18-player roster was announced on 8 May. On 22 May, Rachel Arthur and Theresa Simon withdrew due to injury and Lina Sontag was called up. The final roster was revealed on 7 June.

Germany women's national basketball team roster
Players
Coaches

Pos.	No.	Name	Age – Date of birth	Height	Club	Ctr.
G	3	Alexandra Wilke	26 – 29 September 1996	1.75 m (5 ft 9 in)	Rutronik Stars Keltern	(Germany)
PG	7	Jennifer Crowder	27 – 10 April 1996	1.64 m (5 ft 5 in)	BG Göttingen	(Germany)
PF	11	Marie Gülich	29 – 28 May 1994	1.95 m (6 ft 5 in)	Valencia Basket	(Spain)
SG	13	Leonie Fiebich	23 – 10 January 2000	1.92 m (6 ft 4 in)	Basket Zaragoza	(Spain)
PF	14	Sonja Greinacher	30 – 1 July 1992	1.90 m (6 ft 3 in)	Arka Gdynia	(Poland)
C	15	Luisa Geiselsöder	23 – 10 February 2000	1.90 m (6 ft 3 in)	Roche Vendée BC	(France)
SF	16	Alina Hartmann	27 – 23 October 1995	1.85 m (6 ft 1 in)	CD Zamarat	(Spain)
G	21	Svenja Brunckhorst (C)	31 – 19 October 1991	1.79 m (5 ft 10 in)	TSV 1880 Wasserburg	(Germany)
SF	22	Emily Bessoir	21 – 19 November 2001	1.92 m (6 ft 4 in)	UCLA Bruins	(United States)
G	24	Lina Sontag	19 – 24 November 2003	1.91 m (6 ft 3 in)	UCLA Bruins	(United States)
PF	25	Ama Degbeon	27 – 16 December 1995	1.86 m (6 ft 1 in)	BKG Prima Akademia	(Hungary)
SG	42	Emma Stach	26 – 4 October 1996	1.75 m (5 ft 9 in)	Niki Lefkadas	(Greece)

Head coach

- (Canada) Lisa Thomaidis

Assistant coach(es)

- (Canada) Claire Meadows
- (United States) Sidney Parsons

Legend

- (C) Team captain
- Club – describes last
  club before the tournament
- Age – describes age
  on 15 June 2023

=== Great Britain ===
A 15-player roster was announced on 23 May. The final squad was revealed on 12 June.

Great Britain women's national basketball team roster
Players
Coaches

Pos.	No.	Name	Age – Date of birth	Height	Club	Ctr.
G	0	Nicolette Fairley	31 – 14 April 1992	1.65 m (5 ft 5 in)	Sheffield Hatters	(United Kingdom)
F	4	Erin McGarrachan	31 – 27 April 1992	1.83 m (6 ft 0 in)	Caledonia Gladiators	(United Kingdom)
G	6	Holly Winterburn	22 – 1 October 2000	1.80 m (5 ft 11 in)	London Lions	(United Kingdom)
SG	7	Georgia Gayle	26 – 2 June 1997	1.70 m (5 ft 7 in)	Sheffield Hatters	(United Kingdom)
PF	12	Savannah Wilkinson	24 – 31 October 1998	1.78 m (5 ft 10 in)	London Lions	(United Kingdom)
F	13	Harriett Ottewill-Soulsby	27 – 14 August 1995	1.93 m (6 ft 4 in)	Durham Palatinates	(United Kingdom)
C	14	Temi Fagbenle	30 – 8 September 1992	1.93 m (6 ft 4 in)	London Lions	(United Kingdom)
G	17	Hannah Robb	25 – 28 April 1998	1.75 m (5 ft 9 in)	Leicester Riders	(United Kingdom)
F	21	Mikiah Herbert Harrigan	24 – 21 August 1998	1.85 m (6 ft 1 in)	Galatasaray	(Turkey)
G	23	Sydney Wallace	29 – 6 December 1993	1.73 m (5 ft 8 in)	KSC Szekszárd	(Hungary)
F	25	Ire Ozzy-Momodu	24 – 28 January 1999	1.88 m (6 ft 2 in)	Eastern Michigan Eagles	(United States)
C	31	Kristine Anigwe	26 – 31 March 1997	1.93 m (6 ft 4 in)	Chicago Sky	(United States)

Head coach

- (Spain) Chema Buceta

Assistant coach(es)

- (United Kingdom) Stef Collins
- (United Kingdom) Vanessa Ellis

Legend

- (C) Team captain
- Club – describes last
  club before the tournament
- Age – describes age
  on 15 June 2023

=== Slovenia ===
A 16-player roster was announced on 26 May. The final squad was revealed on 13 June.

Slovenia women's national basketball team roster
Players
Coaches
}

Pos.	No.	Name	Age – Date of birth	Height	Club	Ctr.
C	1	Eva Lisec	27 – 17 June 1995	1.92 m (6 ft 4 in)	Nika Syktyvkar	(Russia)
SG	3	Teja Oblak (C)	32 – 20 December 1990	1.72 m (5 ft 8 in)	USK Praha	(Czech Republic)
SG	5	Tina Cvijanovič	25 – 4 March 1998	1.78 m (5 ft 10 in)	Faenza Futura Basket	(Italy)
PF	9	Hana Ivanusa	18 – 6 September 2004	1.86 m (6 ft 1 in)	ŽKD Ježica	(Slovenia)
PF	10	Tina Jakovina	30 – 11 August 1992	1.82 m (6 ft 0 in)	Crvena zvezda	(Serbia)
SG	11	Eva Rupnik	30 – 18 October 1992	1.76 m (5 ft 9 in)	Namur	(Belgium)
SG	13	Zala Friškovec	23 – 10 October 1999	1.80 m (5 ft 11 in)	CCC Polkowice	(Poland)
C	14	Lara Kozina Bubnič	23 – 2 August 1999	1.90 m (6 ft 3 in)	KK Triglav Kranj	(Slovenia)
SF	17	Ajša Sivka	17 – 23 November 2005	1.92 m (6 ft 4 in)	PF Schio	(Italy)
SG	20	Lea Debeljak	21 – 25 October 2001	1.77 m (5 ft 10 in)	ŽKK Celje	(Slovenia)
F	21	Gala Kramzar	24 – 30 March 1999	1.81 m (5 ft 11 in)	KK Triglav Kranj	(Slovenia)
PG	55	Blaza Ceh	19 – 9 December 2003	1.81 m (5 ft 11 in)	ŽKK Celje	(Slovenia)

Head coach

- (Greece) George Dikeoulakos

Assistant coach(es)

- (Slovenia) Tomaz Fartek
- (Greece) Styliani Kaltsidou

Legend

- (C) Team captain
- Club – describes last
  club before the tournament
- Age – describes age
  on 15 June 2023

== Group D ==
=== Hungary ===
A 17-player roster was announced on 15 May. The final squad was revealed on 10 June.

Hungary women's national basketball team roster
Players
Coaches

Pos.	No.	Name	Age – Date of birth	Height	Club	Ctr.
C	2	Virág Kiss	25 – 12 April 1998	1.94 m (6 ft 4 in)	PEAC-Pécs	(Hungary)
SF	4	Debora Dubei (C)	26 – 4 January 1997	1.82 m (6 ft 0 in)	UNI Győr	(Hungary)
PG	7	Veronika Kányási	24 – 27 May 1999	1.78 m (5 ft 10 in)	DVTK	(Hungary)
C	8	Cyesha Goree	29 – 4 August 1993	1.88 m (6 ft 2 in)	KSC Szekszárd	(Hungary)
G	9	Ágnes Studer	24 – 10 September 1998	1.68 m (5 ft 6 in)	KSC Szekszárd	(Hungary)
PG	11	Nina Aho	25 – 24 June 1997	1.75 m (5 ft 9 in)	DVTK	(Hungary)
SF	13	Ágnes Török	25 – 23 January 1998	1.83 m (6 ft 0 in)	UNI Győr	(Hungary)
SF	18	Aliz Varga	22 – 17 March 2001	1.86 m (6 ft 1 in)	Sopron Basket	(Hungary)
SG	21	Réka Lelik	24 – 14 April 1999	1.79 m (5 ft 10 in)	BC Castors Braine	(Belgium)
PG	23	Bernadett Horváth	26 – 27 August 1996	1.70 m (5 ft 7 in)	Ludovika Csata	(Hungary)
C	44	Bernadett Határ	28 – 24 August 1994	2.08 m (6 ft 10 in)	Sopron Basket	(Hungary)
PG	88	Dóra Ruff-Nagy	28 – 2 February 1995	1.70 m (5 ft 7 in)	UNI Győr	(Hungary)

Head coach

- (Hungary) Norbert Székely

Assistant coach(es)

- (Hungary) László Cziczás
- (Hungary) Dalma Iványi

Legend

- (C) Team captain
- Club – describes last
  club before the tournament
- Age – describes age
  on 15 June 2023

=== Serbia ===
A 22-player roster was announced on 12 May. The final squad was revealed on 13 June.

Serbia women's national basketball team roster
Players
Coaches

Pos.	No.	Name	Age – Date of birth	Height	Club	Ctr.
PF	1	Ivana Raca	23 – 10 September 1999	1.88 m (6 ft 2 in)	Fenerbahçe	(Turkey)
SG	6	Saša Čađo	33 – 13 July 1989	1.78 m (5 ft 10 in)	CCC Polkowice	(Poland)
SG	8	Nevena Jovanović	32 – 30 June 1990	1.79 m (5 ft 10 in)	Nika Syktyvkar	(Russia)
PF	11	Aleksandra Crvendakić	27 – 17 March 1996	1.87 m (6 ft 2 in)	Çukurova Basketbol	(Turkey)
PG	12	Yvonne Anderson	33 – 8 March 1990	1.75 m (5 ft 9 in)	Bourges	(France)
C	14	Dragana Stanković	28 – 18 January 1995	1.95 m (6 ft 5 in)	Sopron Basket	(Hungary)
SF	17	Jovana Nogić	25 – 17 December 1997	1.81 m (5 ft 11 in)	CB Avenida	(Spain)
F	20	Kristina Topuzović	28 – 23 August 1994	1.83 m (6 ft 0 in)	Herner TC	(Germany)
SF	25	Maša Janković	23 – 1 February 2000	1.87 m (6 ft 2 in)	Leganés	(Spain)
C	33	Tina Krajišnik (C)	32 – 12 January 1991	1.90 m (6 ft 3 in)	UMMC Ekaterinburg	(Russia)
PG	40	Ivana Katanić	24 – 16 April 1999	1.74 m (5 ft 9 in)	PEAC-Pécs	(Hungary)
PF	51	Mina Đorđević	24 – 23 February 1999	1.86 m (6 ft 1 in)	Fenerbahçe	(Turkey)

Head coach

- (Serbia) Marina Maljković

Assistant coach(es)

- (Serbia) Filip Bencić
- (Serbia) Ljubica Drljača

Legend

- (C) Team captain
- Club – describes last
  club before the tournament
- Age – describes age
  on 15 June 2023

=== Slovakia ===
A 15-player roster was announced on 16 May. The final squad was revealed on 12 June.

Slovakia women's national basketball team roster
Players
Coaches

Pos.	No.	Name	Age – Date of birth	Height	Club	Ctr.
C	3	Ivana Jakubcová	28 – 20 August 1994	1.97 m (6 ft 6 in)	Angers UFAB 49	(France)
PG	5	Radka Stašová	26 – 14 May 1997	1.69 m (5 ft 7 in)	Al-Qazeres	(Spain)
SF	7	Stella Tarkovičová	23 – 16 July 1999	1.81 m (5 ft 11 in)	GiroLive Panthers Osnabrück	(Germany)
SF	9	Terézia Páleníková	27 – 16 August 1995	1.78 m (5 ft 10 in)	Uni Girona CB	(Spain)
PF	11	Sabína Oroszová	30 – 5 June 1993	1.92 m (6 ft 4 in)	Slávia Banská Bystrica	(Slovakia)
C	16	Alica Moravčíková	28 – 5 December 1994	1.90 m (6 ft 3 in)	Piešťanské Čajky	(Slovakia)
SG	17	Alexandra Buknová	23 – 28 October 1999	1.77 m (5 ft 10 in)	MBK Ružomberok	(Slovakia)
PF	34	Tereza Sedláková	26 – 30 May 1997	1.86 m (6 ft 1 in)	CD Talent	(Spain)
G	38	Miroslava Mištinová	26 – 2 June 1997	1.83 m (6 ft 0 in)	CTL Zagłębie Sosnowiec	(Poland)
PG	41	Barbora Wrzesiński (C)	28 – 15 December 1994	1.79 m (5 ft 10 in)	Arka Gdynia	(Poland)
PG	77	Nikola Dudášová	28 – 17 March 1995	1.78 m (5 ft 10 in)	KSC Szekszárd	(Hungary)
SG	88	Natália Martišková	23 – 24 June 1999	1.70 m (5 ft 7 in)	Slávia Banská Bystrica	(Slovakia)

Head coach

- (Slovakia) Juraj Suja

Assistant coach(es)

- (Slovakia) Peter Jankovič
- (Slovakia) Miloslav Michálik

Legend

- (C) Team captain
- Club – describes last
  club before the tournament
- Age – describes age
  on 15 June 2023

=== Turkey ===
A 20-player roster was announced on 5 May. The final squad was revealed on 12 June.

Turkey women's national basketball team roster
Players
Coaches

Pos.	No.	Name	Age – Date of birth	Height	Club	Ctr.
SG	2	Sevgi Uzun	25 – 25 November 1997	1.78 m (5 ft 10 in)	Botaş SK	(Turkey)
SF	3	Feride Akalan	21 – 14 October 2001	1.85 m (6 ft 1 in)	Nesibe Aydın GSK	(Turkey)
PG	4	Olcay Çakır (C)	29 – 13 July 1993	1.82 m (6 ft 0 in)	Fenerbahçe	(Turkey)
SF	6	Gökşen Fitik	21 – 11 August 2001	1.75 m (5 ft 9 in)	Çukurova Basketbol	(Turkey)
C	7	Teaira McCowan	26 – 28 September 1996	2.04 m (6 ft 8 in)	Galatasaray	(Turkey)
PG	10	Alperi Onar	27 – 2 January 1996	1.70 m (5 ft 7 in)	Fenerbahçe	(Turkey)
PF	11	Elif Bayram	21 – 18 September 2001	1.85 m (6 ft 1 in)	Beşiktaş	(Turkey)
PG	14	Derin Erdoğan	20 – 28 June 2002	1.70 m (5 ft 7 in)	Northeastern Huskies	(United States)
PF	15	Tilbe Şenyürek	28 – 26 April 1995	1.92 m (6 ft 4 in)	Gorzów	(Poland)
PF	23	Meltem Yıldızhan	23 – 5 August 1999	1.88 m (6 ft 2 in)	Galatasaray	(Turkey)
C	28	İlayda Güner	23 – 5 November 1999	1.92 m (6 ft 4 in)	Nesibe Aydın GSK	(Turkey)
C	33	Esra Ural	31 – 18 August 1991	1.98 m (6 ft 6 in)	Çukurova Basketbol	(Turkey)

Head coach

- (Turkey) Ekrem Memnun

Assistant coach(es)

- (Turkey) Osman Olcay Orak
- (Turkey) Nevriye Yılmaz

Legend

- (C) Team captain
- Club – describes last
  club before the tournament
- Age – describes age
  on 15 June 2023
