= Ainars Zvirgzdiņš =

Latvian basketball coach

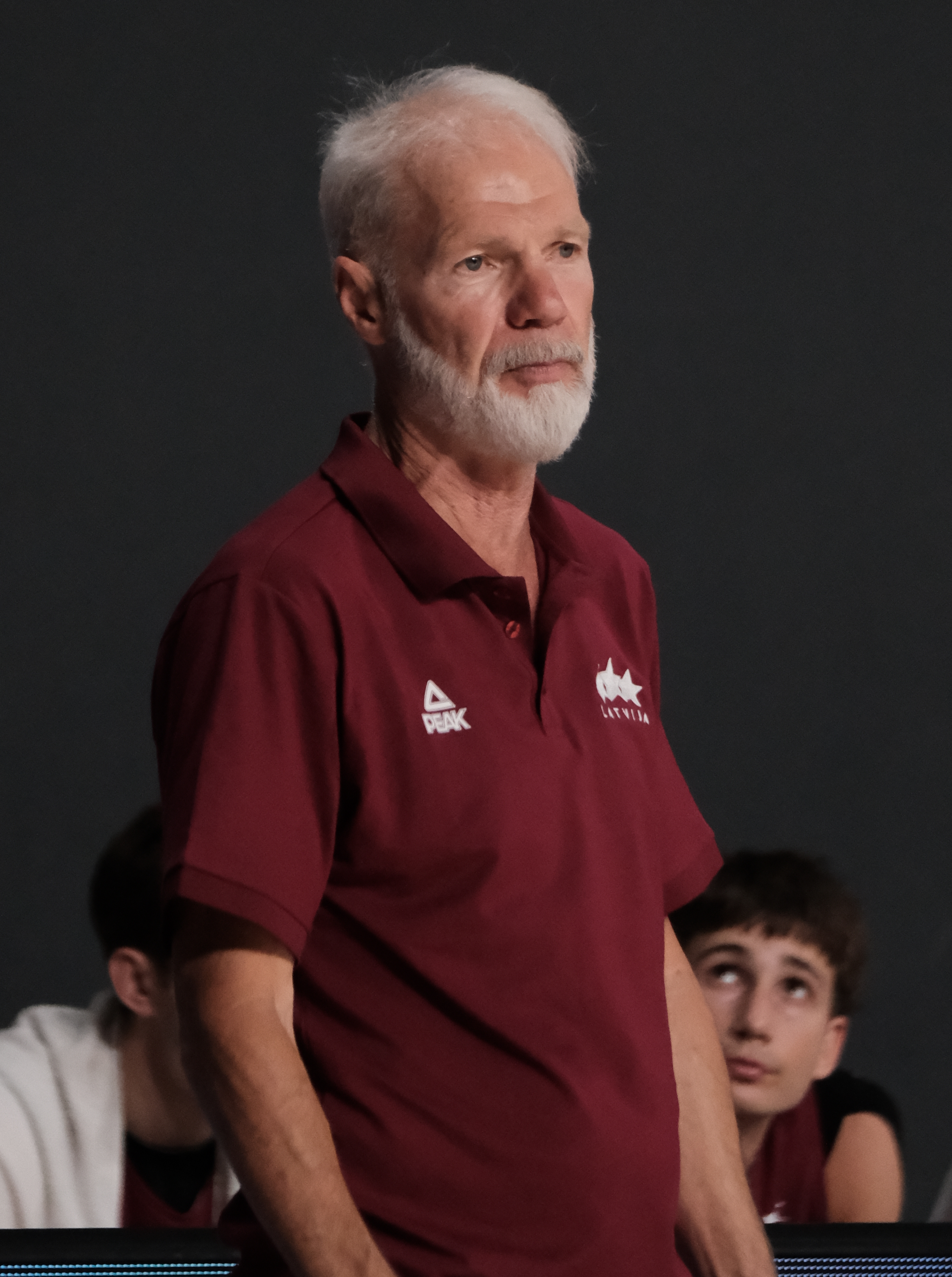

Personal information
- Born: March 2, 1959 (age 67) Sabile, Latvian SSR, Soviet Union
- Position: Women coach

Career history

Coaching
- 2007–2009: Latvia (women)
- 2013–2015: Latvia (women)

Ainars Zvirgzdiņš (born March 2, 1959) is a Latvian basketball coach, mostly known with the Latvia women's national basketball team. He competed with the team at the 2008 Summer Olympics and Eurobasket Women 2007.

Sporting positions
Preceded by ??? Aigars Nerips	Head coach of Latvia women's national basketball team 2007–2009; 2013–2015	Succeeded by George Dikeoulakos; Mārtiņš Zībarts
