= Basketball at the 2017 Jeux de la Francophonie =

Jeux de la Francophonie Basketball Tournament
- Abidjan 2017

Tournament details
- Host nation: Ivory Coast
- City: Abidjan
- Venue: Palais des Sports de Treichville
- Duration: July 22, 2017– July 29, 2017

Women's tournament
- Teams: 16
Medals
Gold medalists	France
Silver medalists	Quebec
Bronze medalists	Senegal

Official website
- www.abidjan2017.ci

Tournaments
← Nice 2013	Moncton-Dieppe 2021 →

The basketball tournament at the 2017 Jeux de la Francophonie in Abidjan, Ivory Coast took place between 22 July and 29 July. Only women's tournament was held in Palais des Sports de Treichville. France defeated Quebec in the gold medal match 73-53.

== Competition schedule ==
G	Group stage	¼	Quarter-finals	½	Semi-finals	B	Bronze medal match	F	Final

Sat 22	Sun 23	Mon 24	Wed 26	Fri 28	Sat 29	
G	G	G	¼	½	B	F

== Participating nations ==
Federation	Nation
FIBA Africa	Benin; Cameroon; Ivory Coast; Gabon; Guinea; Mauritius; Mali; Nigeria; Senegal; Tunisia
FIBA Europe	France; Luxembourg; Romania; Wallonia
FIBA Americas	Quebec
FIBA Asia	Lebanon

== Medalists ==
Event	Gold	Silver	Bronze
Women	France; Romane Bernies; Marie-Eve Paget; Lidija Turčinović; Marie-Michelle Milapie; Margaux Galliou-Loko; Angelina Turmel; Lisa Berkani; Adja Konteh; Catherine Mosengo Masa; Marie Mane; Christelle Diallo; Marième Badiane	Quebec; Kennisha-Shanice Luberisse; Gladys Hakizimana; Raphaëlle Côté; Sarah St Fort; Claudia Édmond; Jane Gagné; Julie Brosseau; Sirah Diarra; Emily Prévost; Catherine Traer; Carrie-Ann Auger; Alexandria Kiss-Rusk	Senegal; Maty Fall; Siga Mariama Barboza; Yaye Irma Dieme; Ndèye Fatou Ndiaye; Loly Ndiaye; Couna Ndao; Nassira Ba; Ndeye Fatou Ndiaye; Aminata Faye; Bineta Ndoye; Marieme Diop; Mame Borso Niang Diallo

== Group stage ==
Times are local UTC+0.

=== Group A ===
Qualified for the quarter-finals

Team	Pld	W	L	PF	PA	PD	Pts
Quebec	3	3	0	181	148	+33	6
Romania	3	2	1	195	166	+29	5
Cameroon	3	1	2	157	178	-21	4
Tunisia	3	0	3	179	220	+41	3

22 July
13:30

Boxscore

Cameroon	43–58	Romania
Scoring by quarter: 10–14, 2–25, 16–7, 15–12
Pts: Assena, Mfoula 11; Rebs: Abenkou 8 Asts: Nyinkev 1		Pts: Ursu, Kelemen 12; Rebs: Ursu 6

Palais des Sports de Treichville, Abidjan
Referees:
(Belgium) Vincent Delestree

22 July
15:45

Boxscore

Tunisia	49–68	Quebec
Scoring by quarter: 10–10, 9–25, 12–10, 18–23
Pts: Jedidi Ep Mistiri 11; Rebs: Jedidi Ep Mistiri 10; Asts: Ben Mechlia 4		Pts: Brosseau 17; Rebs: Diarra 5 Asts: Édmond 6

Palais des Sports de Treichville, Abidjan
Referees:
(Switzerland) Sebastien Clivaz
(Ivory Coast) Hassane Kamate
(Mauritius) M.M.L. Cherubin

23 July
18:00

Romania	53–56	Quebec
Scoring by quarter: 15–14, 15–14, 17–16, 6–12
Pts: Ardelean 15; Rebs: Neagu 7 Asts: Ursu 2		Pts: Kiss-Rusk 21; Rebs: Kiss-Rusk 13; Asts: Kiss-Rusk 4

Palais des Sports de Treichville, Abidjan
Referees:
(Austria) Goran Sljivic
(Senegal) Mbaye Seye
(Burkina Faso) Harouna Maiga

23 July
20:15

Cameroon	68–63	Tunisia
Scoring by quarter: 20–8, 17–19, 19–20, 12–16
Pts: Mfoula 22; Rebs: Mfoula, Nyinkev 5 Asts: Weledji, Tchasi 3		Pts: Hamrouni 24; Rebs: Ben Mechlia 9 Asts: Ben Mechlia 3

Palais des Sports de Treichville, Abidjan
Referees:
(Belgium) Mathieu Bayot

24 july
18:00

Boxscore

Romania	84–67	Tunisia
Scoring by quarter: 22–14, 19–18, 18–19, 25–16
Pts: Ursu 26; Rebs: Ursu 9 Asts: Ursu 3		Pts: Hamrouni 30; Rebs: Hamrouni 6 Asts: Loubiri 3

Palais des Sports de Treichville, Abidjan
Referees:
(Greece) Nikolaos Somos
(Egypt) S. El Sharmouby
(Lebanon) Claude Abi Gebrayel

24 July
20:15

Boxscore

Quebec	57–46	Cameroon
Scoring by quarter: 12–6, 17–16, 11–16, 17–8
Pts: Kiss-Rusk 12; Rebs: Kiss-Rusk 8 Asts: three players 2		Pts: Weledji 14; Rebs: Mfoula 6 Asts: Mfoula 2

Palais des Sports de Treichville, Abidjan
Referees:
(Switzerland) Sebastien Clivaz
(Ivory Coast) Hassane Kamate
(Mauritius) M.M.L. Cherubin
