= Baiba Eglīte =

Latvian basketball player

No. 44 – TTT Rīga
- Position: Guard
- League: LSBL

Personal information
- Born: 9 January 1989 (age 37) Riga, Latvia
- Listed height: 5 ft 9 in (1.75 m)

Career information
- College: UTEP (2012)
- WNBA draft: 2012: undrafted
Medals
Women's 3x3 basketball
Representing Latvia
Europe Cup
Bronze medal – third place	2019 Debrecen

Baiba Eglīte (born 9 January 1989) is a Latvian basketball player for TTT Rīga and the Latvian national team.

She participated at the 2018 FIBA Women's Basketball World Cup.

== University of Texas at El Paso statistics ==
Ratios
Year	Team	GP	FG%	3P%	FT%	RBG	APG	BPG	SPG	PPG
2008-09	UTEP	Did not play per NCAA rules								
2009-10	UTEP	11	52.2%	45.5%	78.6%	1.00	0.36	0.18	0.36	3.64
2010-11	UTEP	19	45.7%	45.0%	87.5%	0.95	0.47	-	0.11	2.53
2011-12	UTEP	26	36.6%	35.5%	-	0.31	0.35	-	0.35	1.58
Career		56	43.4%	40.3%	78.3%	0.66	0.39	0.04	0.27	2.30

Totals
Year	Team	GP	FG	FGA	3P	3PA	FT	FTA	REB	A	BK	ST	PTS
2008-09	UTEP	Did not play per NCAA rules											
2009-10	UTEP	11	12	23	5	11	11	14	11	4	2	4	40
2010-11	UTEP	19	16	35	9	20	7	8	18	9	0	2	48
2011-12	UTEP	26	15	41	11	31	0	1	8	9	0	9	41
Career		56	43	99	25	62	18	23	37	22	2	15	129
