= Julie Brosseau =

Canadian basketball player

No. 20 – Kansas Jayhawks
- Position: Guard
- League: Big 12 Conference

Personal information
- Born: December 29, 1995 (age 30) Repentigny, Quebec
- Listed height: 5 ft 9 in (1.75 m)

Career information
- High school: Collège Montmorency (Laval, Quebec)
- College: Maine (2016–2018); Utah (2019–2020); Kansas (2020–present)

Julie Brosseau (born December 29, 1995) is a Quebecoise basketball shooting guard formerly with the Kansas Jayhawks of the Big 12 Conference. Brosseau represented Quebec at the 2017 Jeux de la Francophonie. Brosseau was Team Quebec's leading scorer as the team won a silver medal after losing to France in the final match. Brosseau was Quebec's flag bearer in the closing ceremony. She transferred to Utah in the Pac-12 Conference, averaging 4.7 points per game in the 2019–20 season. She then moved to Kansas as a graduate transfer for the 2020–21 season.

Brosseau is from the Montreal suburb of Repentigny. While attending Collège Montmorency, she was ranked as the 4th best women's basketball prospect in Canada by Crown Scout Magazine. She debuted for the Lady Black Bears during the 2016–17 season.

== Maine, Utah and Kansas statistics ==
Legend
GP	Games played	GS	Games started	MPG	Minutes per game
FG%	Field goal percentage	3P%	3-point field goal percentage	FT%	Free throw percentage
RPG	Rebounds per game	APG	Assists per game	SPG	Steals per game
BPG	Blocks per game	PPG	Points per game	**Bold**	Career high

Year	Team	GP	Points	FG%	3P%	FT%	RPG	APG	SPG	BPG	PPG
2016–17	Maine	**34**	231	34.7%	33.7%	84.2%	1.7	1.3	**0.8**	0.0	6.8
2017–18	Maine	32	**363**	**37.5%**	34.7%	76.8%	**3.1**	**2.2**	0.7	0.1	**11.3**
2018–19	Utah	Sat due to NCAA transfer rules									
2019–20	Utah	30	142	36.5%	**36.2%**	78.4%	1.3	1.1	0.5	**0.1**	4.7
2020–21	Kansas	25	165	29.9%	26.1%	**88.4%**	1.3	0.7	0.2	0.0	6.6
Career		121	901	35.1%	32.8%	81.3%	1.9	1.4	0.6	0.1	7.4
