= Marie-Paule Foppossi =

French basketball player (born 1998)

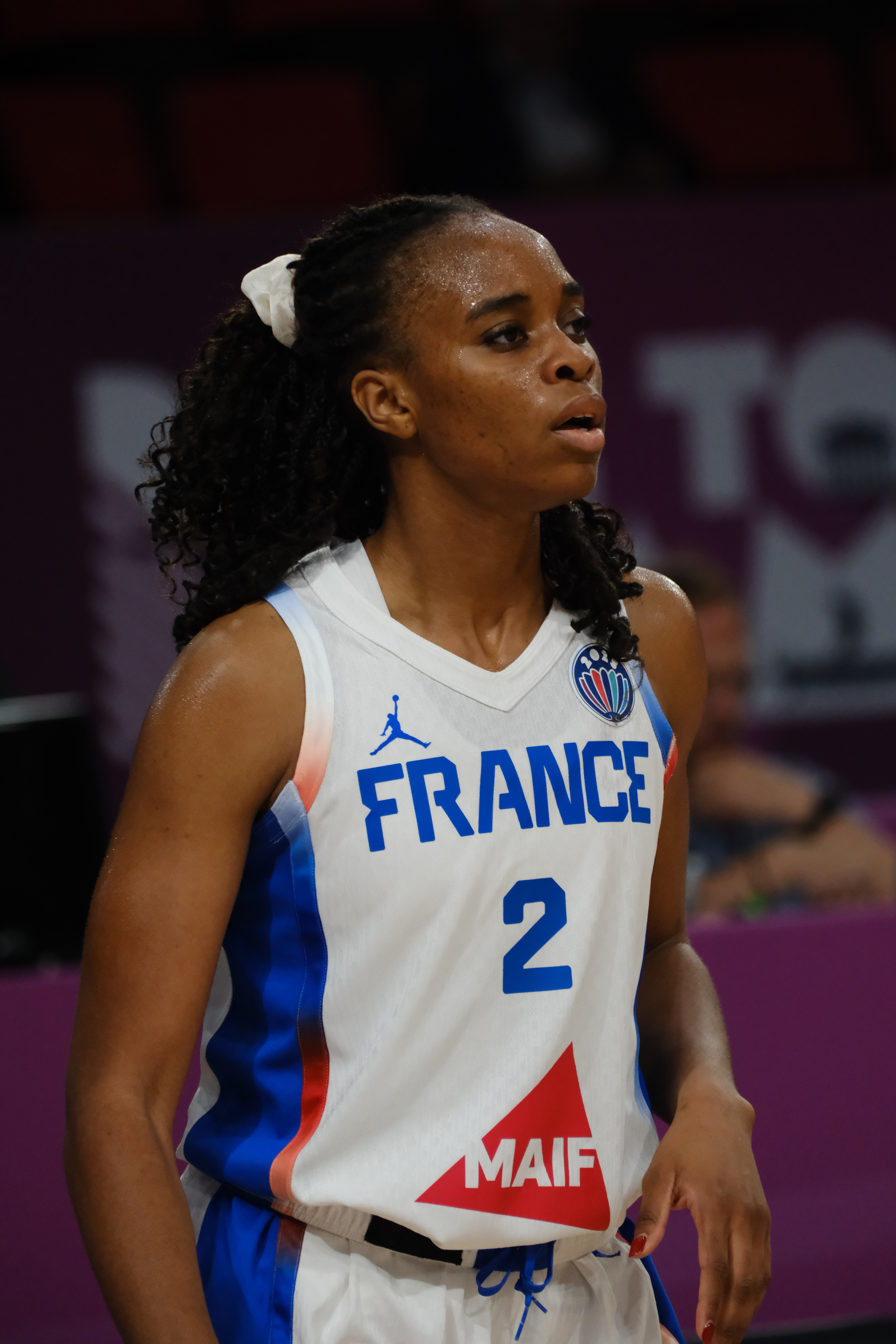
- Foppossi in 2025

No. 2 – Villeneuve d'Ascq
- Position: Small forward
- League: LFB

Personal information
- Born: 28 January 1998 (age 28) Strasbourg, France
- Listed height: 1.84 m (6 ft 0 in)

Career history
- 2016–2017: Cavigal Nice Basket
- 2017–2019: Syracuse Orange
- 2019–2022: Rhode Island Rams
- 2022–2024: Tarbes
- 2024–present: Villeneuve d'Ascq

Marie-Paule Foppossi (born 28 January 1998 in Strasbourg) is a French professional basketball player for ESB Villeneuve-d'Ascq of the La Boulangère Wonderligue.

== College career ==
She played college basketball for the Syracuse Orange, and Rhode Island Rams.

== Professional career ==
Foppossi played for Tarbes GB of the Ligue Féminine de Basketball (LFB) from 2022 to 2024.

In June 2024, she signed with ESB Villeneuve-d'Ascq.

== National team career ==
Foppossi competed at the 2015 U18 European Championship, 2017 FIBA U19 World Cup, 2017 FIBA U20 European Championship, and EuroBasket Women 2023, winning a bronze medal.
