= Lola Pendande =

Spanish basketball player (born 2000)

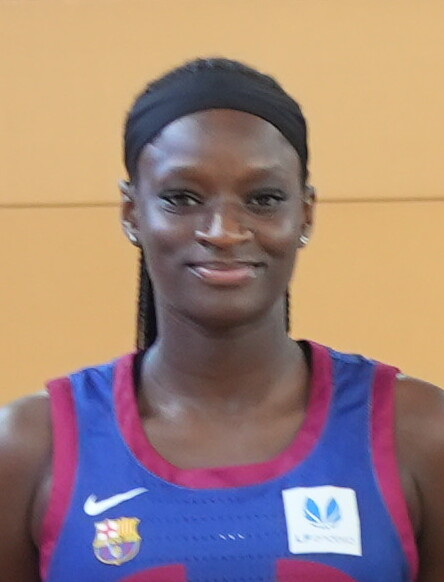

Personal information
- Born: 29 March 2000 (age 26) El Ejido, Spain
- Position: Center

Career history
- CB Santfeliuenc
Medals
Women's basketball
Representing Spain
EuroBasket
Silver medal – second place	2023 Israel/Slovenia

María Dolores "Lola" Pendande Mendes (born 29 March 2000) is a Spanish basketball player who plays as a center for the Spain women's national team. She was born to Bissau-Guinean parents.

== Career ==
She played at the 2018 FIBA U20 Women's European Championship, and EuroBasket Women 2023, winning a silver medal.

She played for University of Utah, and University of Miami.

She played for CB Santfeliuenc.

== National team career ==
Pendande made her international debut in 2016, when she was 16-years-old. In 2022, she made her debut with the senior national team at 22. She played at EuroBasket Women 2023, winning a silver medal.

- 6th 2016 FIBA Under-17 World Championship (youth)
- 2016 FIBA Europe Under-16 Championship (youth)
- 6th 2017 FIBA Europe Under-18 Championship (youth)
- 2023 Eurobasket
