= Belén Arrojo =

Spanish basketball player

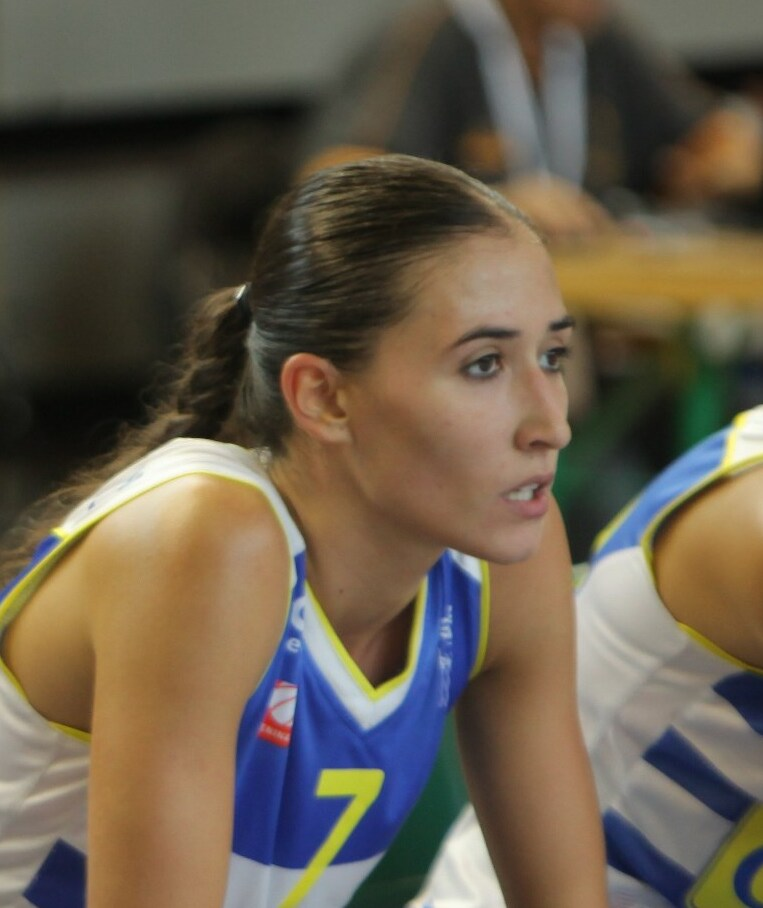

No. 7 – Gernika KESB
- Position: Small forward
- League: LF

Personal information
- Born: 8 January 1995 (age 31) Granada, Spain
- Listed height: 6 ft 2 in (1.88 m)

Career information
- Playing career: 2013–present

Career history
- 2011–2013: Segle XXI (youth/LF2)
- 2013–2014: CB Ciudad de Burgos
- 2014–2015: Mann Filter
- 2015–2017: Cadì La Seu
- 2017–2018: Snatt's Femení Sant Adrià
- 2018–2019: Perfumerías Avenida
- 2019–present: Gernika KESB

Career highlights
- Spanish Cup champion (2019)

María Belén Arrojo Jiménez (born 8 January 1995) is a Spanish basketball player who plays for Lointek Gernika Bizkaia and the Spanish national team. She is considered one of the most promising young players of Spanish basketball.

== Club career ==
Arrojo moved from her natal Granada to Barcelona to play for Segle XXI at 14, and she progressed to play in the (Spanish second tier league) from 2011 to 2013. Since 2013 she has played in the (Spanish top tier league) in different clubs.

=== EuroLeague and EuroCup statistics ===
Season	Team	GP	MPP	PPP	RPP	APP
2018–19 EuroLeague	(Spain) Perfumerías Avenida	11	7.5	1.7	0.8	0.3
2019–20 EuroCup	(Spain) Lointek Gernika Bizkaia	12	30.4	10.6	2.6	5.0

== National team ==
Arrojo started playing with Spain's youth teams at 15, winning a total of five medals from 2010 to 2015. She made her debut with the senior team in 2015, when she was 20 years old.

- 5th 2010 FIBA Europe Under-16 Championship (youth)
- 2011 FIBA Europe Under-16 Championship (youth)
- 5th 2012 FIBA Europe Under-18 Championship (youth)
- 2012 FIBA Under-17 World Championship (youth)
- 4th 2013 FIBA Under-19 World Championship (youth)
- 2013 FIBA Europe Under-18 Championship (youth)
- 2014 FIBA Europe Under-20 Championship (youth)
- 2015 FIBA Europe Under-20 Championship (youth)
- 2018 World Championship
