= Mayra Leiva =

Argentine basketball player

No. 17 – Presidente Venceslau
- Position: Center
- League: NBB

Personal information
- Born: 17 August 1996 (age 28); Mendoza, Argentina
- Listed height: 6 ft 1 in (1.85 m)

Career information
- WNBA draft: 2018: undrafted

Mayra Agustina Leiva Roux (born 17 August 1996) is an Argentine basketball player for Presidente Venceslau and the Argentina women's national basketball team.

She defended Argentina at the 2018 FIBA Women's Basketball World Cup.
