= Haruno Nemoto =

Japanese basketball player

No. 4 – Mitsubishi Electric Koalas
- Position: Shooting guard
- League: WJBL

Personal information
- Born: 18 April 1995 (age 31)
- Listed height: 5 ft 9 in (1.75 m)
- Listed weight: 148 lb (67 kg)

Career information
- WNBA draft: 2017: undrafted

Haruno Nemoto (根本 葉瑠乃, Nemoto Haruno; born 18 April 1995) is a Japanese basketball player for Mitsubishi Electric Koalas and the Japanese national team.

She participated at the 2018 FIBA Women's Basketball World Cup.
