= Baek Ji-eun =

South Korean basketball player

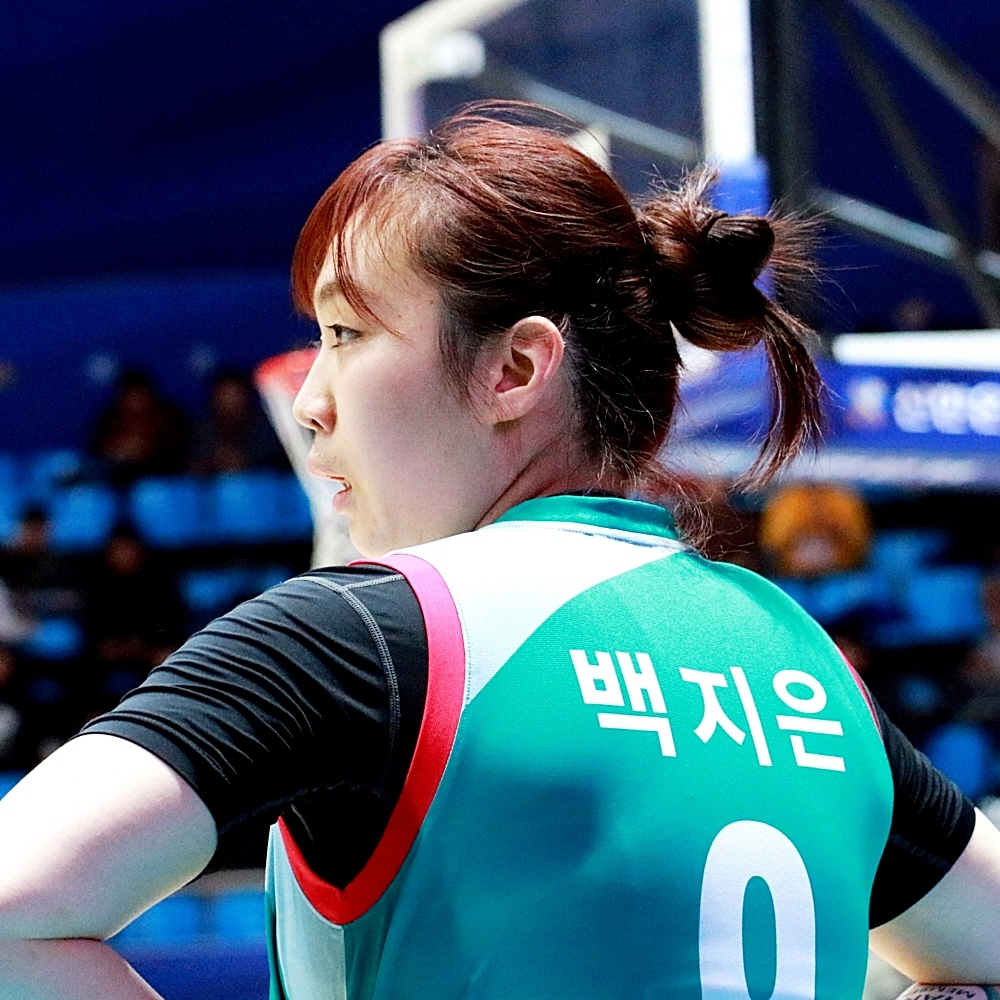

No. 9 – Bucheon KEB Hana Bank
- Position: Forward
- League: WKBL

Personal information
- Born: 5 January 1988 (age 38)
- Listed height: 5 ft 10 in (1.78 m)

Career information
- WNBA draft: 2009: undrafted

Baek Ji-eun (born 5 January 1988) is a South Korean basketball player for Bucheon KEB Hana Bank and the South Korean national team.

She participated at the 2018 FIBA Women's Basketball World Cup.
