= Hatty Nawezhi =

Belgian basketball player

Rioja ISB
- Position: Center
- League: LFB2

Personal information
- Born: 7 September 1994 (age 32) Kinshasa, DR Congo
- Listed height: 6 ft 1 in (1.85 m)

Career information
- College: Oklahoma State
- WNBA draft: 2017: undrafted

Harriet Nahwezhi-Bende (born 7 September 1994) is a Belgian basketball player for Rioja ISB and the Belgian national team.

She participated at the 2018 FIBA Women's Basketball World Cup.
