= George Dikeoulakos =

Greek basketball coach (born 1969)

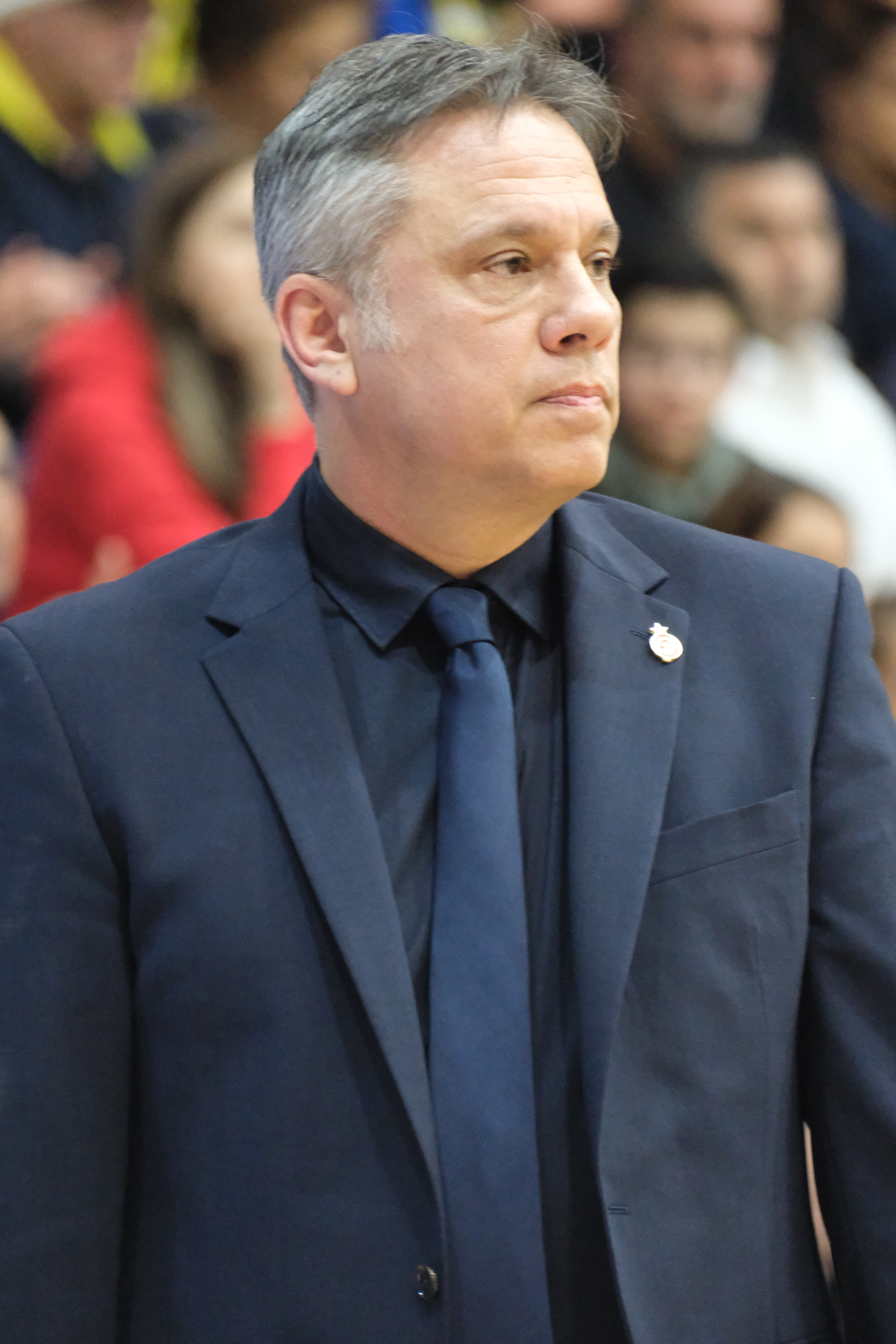
- Dikeoulakos in 2025

Personal information
- Born: 26 January 1969 (age 57) Athens, Greece
- Position: Head coach
- Coaching career: 2000–present

Career history

Coaching
- 2000–2001: Dafnis (assistant)
- 2001–2002: Olympiacos (assistant)
- 2002–2003: Panionios (assistant)
- 2004–2005: Papagou
- 2006–2007: Panellinios (assistant)
- 2008–2010: Athinaikos
- 2010–2011: Lotos Gdynia
- 2011–2012: Fenerbahçe
- 2012–2013: CSM Târgoviște
- 2013–2015: Nadezhda Orenburg
- 2015–2017: Fenerbahçe
- 2017–2018: CCC Polkowice
- 2018–2019: Shanxi Xing Rui Flame
- 2019–2020: Nadezhda Orenburg
- 2021–2025: Beretta Famila Schio
- 2025–2026: ÇBK Mersin
- 2026: Beretta Famila Schio

George Dikeoulakos (or Dikaioulakos, Greek: Γιώργος (Τζώρτζης) Δικαιουλάκος; born 26 January 1969) is a Greek professional basketball coach.

== Playing career ==
As a player, Dikeoulakos played for Papagou in his homeland. At the age of 19, he moved to Yugoslavia and joined Kosovo Polje. He also played for Prishtina, Trepça and Famos Sarajevo. While he was in Yugoslavia, he started his coaching career with young players and youth programs. In 1993, the war in Bosnia forced him to return to Greece, but a number of serious injuries forced him to stop playing and dedicate to coaching career.

== Coaching career ==
His first coaching job was in youth basketball as he worked with the under-15 and under-18 teams of the Greek side Falirou. Soon he promoted as the head coach of the men's team of Akadimia Ilioupolis where at that time were playing in the C division.

For two consecutive seasons he worked as an assistant coach for the A2 team of Milonas where they celebrated the second place which was leading to the A1 division.

The next two years he worked at the A1 team of Dafni as the assistant coach of Kostas Missas and Dirk Bauermann.

One of his career's milestones was the job offered to him by Slobodan Subotić as his assistant of EuroLeague team Olympiacos for the 2001–02 season, where they celebrated the Greek Cup and reached the finals of the Greek League and the last 16 of the EuroLeague. The next season he again worked with Missas at Panionios. In 2004 he was the head coach of the B league team Papagos. In 2006 he was the assistant coach of Kalafatakis at the A1 team Panellinios. That season the team finished fifth and secured a place in the ULEB Cup.

Between 2008 and 2010, he was the head coach of the women's club Athinaikos. With the team, he became the Greek champion, finishing two seasons without losing any games, putting the biggest base for breaking the world record of 105 wins in a row. In 2010, Athinaikos won the triple crown (Greek Championship, Greek Cup and Eurocup). During the season, he also became the head coach of the Latvia women's basketball team.

In January 2011, Dikeoulakos accepted the offer from the Polish EuroLeague team Lotos Gdynia, with whom he won the Polish Cup.

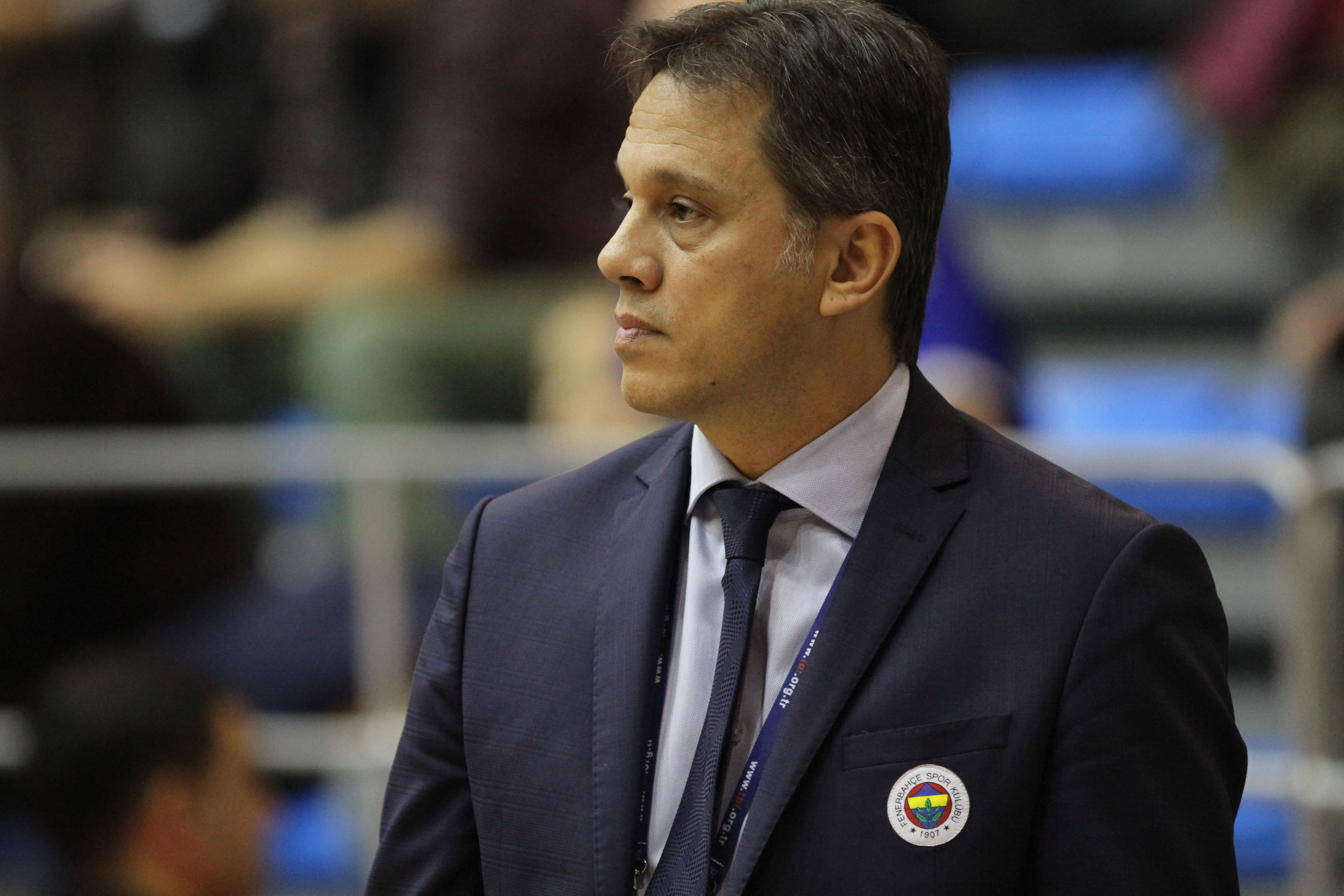
Dikeoulakos with Fenerbahçe in 2015

In May 2011 he moved to Turkey and signed with Fenerbahçe Istanbul. With the team, he won the Turkish championship and reached the EuroLeague Final 4 for the first time in the history of the club. Although it was a successful season, at the end of the season he left. In June 2012 he accepted the two-year contract from the Romanian team CSM Târgovişte. In January 2013, the club announced that Dikeoulakos was sacked although the team was ranked first in the Romanian League and already secured the EuroLeague playoffs. The reason for that conflict was that the club was forcing the coach and the players to accept a salary reduction.

In the meantime he was leading the Greece women's national team, when in November 2013 he accepted the offer of the Russian EuroLeague club Nadezhda from Orenburg. Under his coaching, the Russian club reached the EuroLeague Final 4 for the first time in their history, and finished in the second place for two consecutive seasons, the best position they ever made. In the first final they beat UMMC Yekaterinburg on the road but they didn't manage to take the championship. In May 2015, he announced that he would leave the club for personal reasons. A few hours later, the Turkish team Fenerbahçe announced Dikeoulakos as their new head coach.

In Fenerbahçe he stayed for two years and the result of this cooperation was one championship, one cup, one super cup and two participations in the EuroLeague Final 4.

In June 2017, he returned to Poland and signed for the EuroLeague team CCC Polkowice.

In May 2018 he moved to China and joined Shanxi Xing Rui.

The 2019–20 season found him back at Nadezhda Orenburg. They were stabilized in the third place of the Russian League, and also finished third in their group in EuroLeague. In the play-off games and the entry to the EuroLeague Final 4 they played against Lyon in France on 11 March 2020, and won 80–78. However, due to the COVID-19 pandemic, the remainder of the 2019–20 season was cancelled.

In June 2021, the Italian team Famila Schio announced Dikeoulakos as their new head coach for the next three years. In his first season, he won all three trophies in Italy (Italian Championship, Italian Cup and Italian Supercup), a feat he also repeated in 2022–23. Furthermore, he led Famila Schio to the Final 4 tournament of the 2022–23 EuroLeague Women, where they won bronze medal after defeating USK Praha in the third-place game.

In the 2023–24 season, Dikeoulakos led his team to victory in the Italian Cup, defeating arch-rival Venezia in the final. However, Venezia had their revenge in the league, where they overcame his team to claim the national championship. On the European stage, he guided his squad to the EuroLeague playoffs, where their campaign ended in the quarter-finals after a 2–1 series loss to USK Praha.

In the 2024–25 season, he once again won the Italian championship and the Italian Cup, both times triumphing over long-time rivals Venezia. Under his leadership, the team also advanced to the final stage of the newly established EuroLeague Final Six, held in Zaragoza.

A few days after the Italian finals, the EuroLeague runners-up ÇBK Mersin announced Dikeoulakos as their new head coach for the next two years.

On 17 February 2026, Dikeoulakos parted ways with ÇBK Mersin by mutual agreement. despite the team being in the EuroCup semifinals, and shortly after, the Italian club announced his return to his beloved Schio, where he secured the 2025–2026 season championship title once more.

=== Coaching national teams ===
Starting in 2006, Dikeoulakos was working with Costas Missas as an assistant coach of the Greece women's national team. Together they achieved the fifth place in Eurobasket 2009 in Latvia, securing the ticket for the World Championship.

The same year, the same coaching duet won the gold medal in men's U20 Eurobasket.

The next two years he was the head coach of the Latvia women's national team and in Eurobasket 2011 they finished eighth.

In 2013, the Greek Basketball Federation announced Dikeoulakos as the new head coach with the goal to pass the qualification games for the Eurobasket 2015. In the qualification round the team finished first and qualified for the Eurobasket 2015 where they finished 10th out of 20 countries.

In October 2021, he was announced as the new head coach of the Slovenian women's national team.
