= Ndèye Fatou Ndiaye =

Senegalese basketball player (born 1994)

SLBC
- Position: Shooting guard
- League: SDI

Personal information
- Born: 21 July 1994 (age 32) Republic, Senegal
- Listed height: 5 ft 11 in (1.80 m)

Career information
- High school: Hopkins High School (Minnetonka, Minnesota)
- WNBA draft: 2016: undrafted

Ndèye Fatou Ndiaye (born 21 July 1994) is a Senegalese basketball player for Saint-Louis Basket Club and the Senegalese national team.

She participated at the 2018 FIBA Women's Basketball World Cup.
