= Aigars Nerips =

Latvian basketball coach

TTT Riga
- Position: Head Coach

Personal information
- Born: 7 September 1967 (age 59) Ainaži, Latvian SSR, USSR

Aigars Nerips (born 7 September 1967) is a professional Latvian basketball coach currently signed with Latvian club TTT Riga. He is also head coach of Latvia women's national basketball team.

Under his guidance, the Latvian national team finished 13th at the 2013 European Championships.
