= Latvia women's national basketball team =

Women's national basketball team representing Latvia

Latvia
- FIBA ranking: 36 ▼1 (14 September 2026)
- FIBA zone: FIBA Europe
- National federation: LBS
- Coach: Matīss Rožlapa

Olympic Games
- Appearances: 1

World Cup
- Appearances: 1

EuroBasket
- Appearances: 10
Home	Away

The Latvia women's national basketball team is the national women's basketball team representing Latvia. It is administered by the Latvian Basketball Association. It has participated in EuroBasket Women three times and once in the Olympic Games.

== History ==
Golden age of Latvia women's national basketball team was from 2007 to 2009, when head coach was Ainars Zvirgzdiņš. In EuroBasket 2007 Latvia first time in history reached semi-final. In third place game they lost to Belarus. This result allowed to get in 2008 Olympic Qualifying Tournament, which had overpowered in next summer in Madrid, and Latvia took part of 2008 Summer Olympics.

EuroBasket 2009 was held in Latvia. In this tournament Latvia reached quarterfinal, where they lost to Russia in overtime with 64–69. They also lost to Italy in classification rounds. Latvia got seventh place in this tournament. After this tournament head coach Ainars Zvirgzdiņš and several players left national team.

In EuroBasket 2011 head coach was Greek basketball coach George Dikeoulakos. In his management Latvia also reached quarterfinal, but latterly got eighth place.

In EuroBasket 2013 head coach was Aigars Nerips, Latvia lost all of three games.

In EuroBasket 2015 Latvia lost in the first round.

In EuroBasket 2017, Mārtiņš Zībarts was assigned to manage the national team, Latvia got out of the low tide and reached quarterfinal, they got sixth place finally.

In EuroBasket 2019, Mārtiņš Zībarts was still in charge of the national team, Latvia was eliminated in qualification for quarterfinals.

== Tournament record ==
=== Olympic Games ===
- 2008 : 9th

=== World Cups ===
- 2018 : 13th

=== EuroBasket ===
EuroBasket Women					Qualification		
Year	Position	Pld	W	L	Pld	W	L
(Poland) 1999	9th / 12	7	3	4			
(France) 2001	Did not enter						
(Greece) 2003	Did not enter						
(Turkey) 2005	6th / 12	8	4	4			
(Italy) 2007	4th / 16	9	6	3			
(Latvia) 2009	7th / 16	9	5	4			
(Poland) 2011	8th / 16	9	3	6	6	4	2
(France) 2013	15th / 16	3	0	3	8	5	3
(Hungary) (Romania) 2015	13th / 20	4	2	2	6	5	1
(Czech Republic) 2017	6th / 16	7	3	4	4	3	1
(Latvia) (Serbia) 2019	11th / 16	4	1	3			
(France) (Spain) 2021	Did not qualify						
(Israel) (Slovenia) 2023	13th / 16	3	1	2	4	4	0
(Czech Republic) (Germany) (Italy) (Greece) 2025	Did not qualify				6	4	2
(Belgium) (Finland) (Sweden) (Lithuania) 2027	To be determined				To be determined		
	Total	63	28	35	34	25	9

== Team ==
=== Current roster ===
Roster for the EuroBasket Women 2023.

Latvia women's national basketball team roster roster
Players
Coaches

Pos.	No.	Name	Age – Date of birth	Height	Club	Ctr.
PF	4	Paula Strautmane	26 – 23 March 1997	1.85 m (6 ft 1 in)	AE Sedis Bàsquet	(Spain)
SG	6	Ketija Vihmane	22 – 5 March 2001	1.69 m (5 ft 7 in)	Saarlouis Royals	(Germany)
PF	10	Karlīne Pilābere	32 – 16 November 1990	1.86 m (6 ft 1 in)	Alma Basket Patti	(Italy)
PF	11	Aija Jurjāne	35 – 15 January 1988	1.90 m (6 ft 3 in)	Galatasaray	(Turkey)
C	12	Anete Šteinberga (C)	33 – 29 January 1990	1.90 m (6 ft 3 in)	Tango Bourges Basket	(France)
SG	15	Ieva Pulvere	32 – 22 July 1990	1.72 m (5 ft 8 in)	Galatasaray	(Turkey)
PG	16	Ilze Jākobsone	29 – 19 April 1994	1.68 m (5 ft 6 in)	TTT Riga	(Latvia)
F	21	Vanesa Jasa	19 – 9 July 2003	1.78 m (5 ft 10 in)	TTT Riga	(Latvia)
PF	23	Aleksa Gulbe	23 – 5 February 2000	1.86 m (6 ft 1 in)	CB Avenida	(Spain)
C	25	Marta Miščenko	27 – 27 November 1995	1.96 m (6 ft 5 in)	TTT Riga	(Latvia)
SF	33	Kitija Laksa	27 – 21 May 1996	1.86 m (6 ft 1 in)	Virtus Bologna	(Italy)
SF	35	Kate Krēsliņa	27 – 14 April 1996	1.84 m (6 ft 0 in)	TTT Riga	(Latvia)

Head coach

- (Latvia) Gundars Vētra

Assistant coach(es)

- (Latvia) Mārtiņš Zībarts
- (Latvia) Ainars Zvirgzdiņš

Legend

- (C) Team captain
- Club – describes last
  club before the tournament
- Age – describes age
  on 15 June 2023

=== Notable players ===
- Gunta Baško-Melnbārde
- Anete Jēkabsone-Žogota
- Uljana Semjonova (played in Soviet Union team)
- Ieva Tāre

=== Notable coaches ===
- George Dikeoulakos
- Armands Krauliņš
- Ainars Zvirgzdiņš
- Aigars Nerips
