= Mārtiņš Zībarts =

Latvian basketball coach

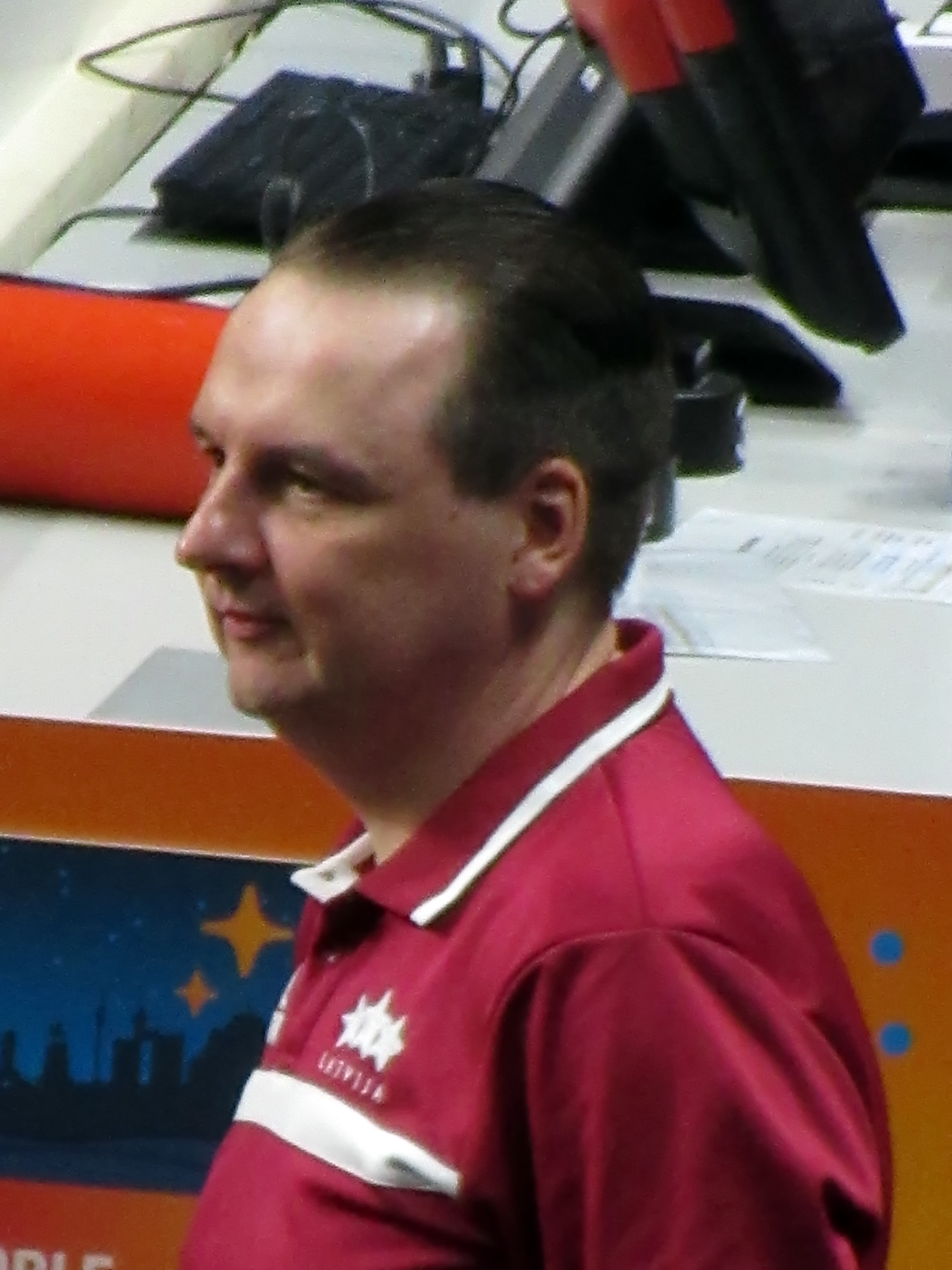

VEF Rīga
- Position: Assistant coach
- League: LBL; LEBL

Personal information
- Born: 15 February 1974 (age 52) Riga, Latvia
- Coaching career: 1999–present

Career history

Coaching
- 1999–2008: Latvijas Universitate
- 2007–2008: Barons (assistant)
- 2008–2009: Barons
- 2009–2010: Barons (assistant)
- 2010–2011: Latvijas Universitate
- 2011–2012: Ventspils (assistant)
- 2012–2013: BC Spartak Primorye (assistant)
- 2013–2014: Spartak Saint Petersburg (assistant)
- 2014–2015: Dynamo Kursk (assistant)
- 2015–2019: Latvia (women)
- 2017–2020: TTT Riga
- 2021–2023: Olympiacos
- 2023–2024: Shanxi Flame
- 2024–2025: TTT Riga
- 2025–2026: Arka Gdynia
- 2026–present: VEF Rīga (assistant)

Mārtiņš Zībarts (born 15 February 1974) is a distinguished basketball coach renowned for his contributions to both men's and women's basketball, currently head coach of TTT Rīga women's basketball team. Throughout his career, Mārtiņš Zībarts has demonstrated a profound commitment to basketball, significantly impacting teams across various countries and earning respect for his strategic approach to coaching. So far in modern era he is the only coach in Latvian basketball who won Euroleague title.

== Early career ==
Zībarts commenced his coaching journey with Latvijas Universitate men's team and simultaneously led the Kolibri Junior women's team from 1999 to 2010.

He served as an assistant coach for Barons during the 2007/08 - 2009/10 seasons, winning 2 times Latvian Championship and FIBA Eurocup. also achieving the Baltic League Semifinals. Zībarts expanded his expertise internationally by taking on assistant coaching positions with:

- Ventspils (2011–2012)
- BC Spartak Primorye (2012–2013)
- Spartak Saint Petersburg (2013–2014)
- Dynamo Kursk (2014–2017)

== Head coach roles ==
- Latvijas Universitate men's team from 1999 to 2011
- In January 2009, Zibarts was named head coach in Barons Riga and he bring team to finals, but lost LBL finals game 7 in overtime.
- Dynamo Kursk in the 2015/16 season
- TTT Riga: He held the head coach position at TTT Riga from 2017 to 2020, and after a series of international engagements, he resumed this role in 2024. After the season he earn Coach of the year award in Eurobasket.com All-Euroleague Awards 2019 Also in FIBA expert Paul Nilsen opinion he earn Best coach award and TTT Riga team - Overachievers prize. Next season TTT Riga made incredible EuroLeague Women win against UMMC Ekaterinburg and it is marked as the best moment for Latvian club basketball since regained independence.
- Olympiacos: In the 2021/22 season, Zībarts signed with Olympiacos, bringing his coaching acumen to the Greek women's basketball scene winning Greek Cup and Championship. The team qualified for Euroleague in the 2022/23 season.
- Shanxi Flame: For the 2023/24 season, he took on the head coach role for Shanxi Flame in China, further broadening his international coaching portfolio and achieved 28–12 record in very competitive competition.

== Latvia Women's National Team ==
From 2015 to 2019, Zībarts was the head coach of the Latvia women's national basketball team, leading them in various international competitions and for the best achievements in decade. Spanish national team coach Lucas Mondelo, holds respect for his Kursk assistant. "He had to adapt during the season to be a third coach in Dynamo Kursk, but we know he is a good head coach. One of the big things he brings to Latvia is the ability to get the right chemistry for the team. Tactically, he is a great coach and one of the best things he does is get the absolute best from his players." Latvia women's national basketball team from 2015 to 2019.

== Achievements and awards ==
- Silver Medal, U20 European Championship 2023
- Greek League Champion 2021/22
- Greek Cup Champion 2021/22
- EEWBL Champion 2018/19
- Baltic League Champion 2018/19, 2019/20
- Quarterfinalist Euroleague 2018/19
- Qualified for the 2018 World Championship with Latvian National Team
- 6th position | 2017 European Championship
- Euroleague Champion 2016/17
- Latvian League Champion 2017/18, 2018/19, 2019/20
- EEWBL Finalist 2017/18
- Russian League Finalist 2016/17
- Euroleague Quarter Finalist 2015/16
- Russian League Semifinalist 2015/16
- Bronze Medal Euroleague 2014/15
- Russian Cup Champion 2014/15, 2015/16
- Quarterfinalist Eurochallenge 2011/12
- Bronze Medal | U20 European Championship 2010
- Latvian League Finalist 2008/09, 2011/12 (Men)
- Latvian League Champion 2007/08, 2009/10 (Men)
- Gold Medal | U18 European Championship 2008 Div B
- Eurocup Champion 2007/08 (Men)
- Silver Medal | U16 European Championship - 2006 Div B
