= Ribera Steakhouse =

Restaurant in Tokyo, Japan

Coordinates: 35°37′48″N 139°43′43″E

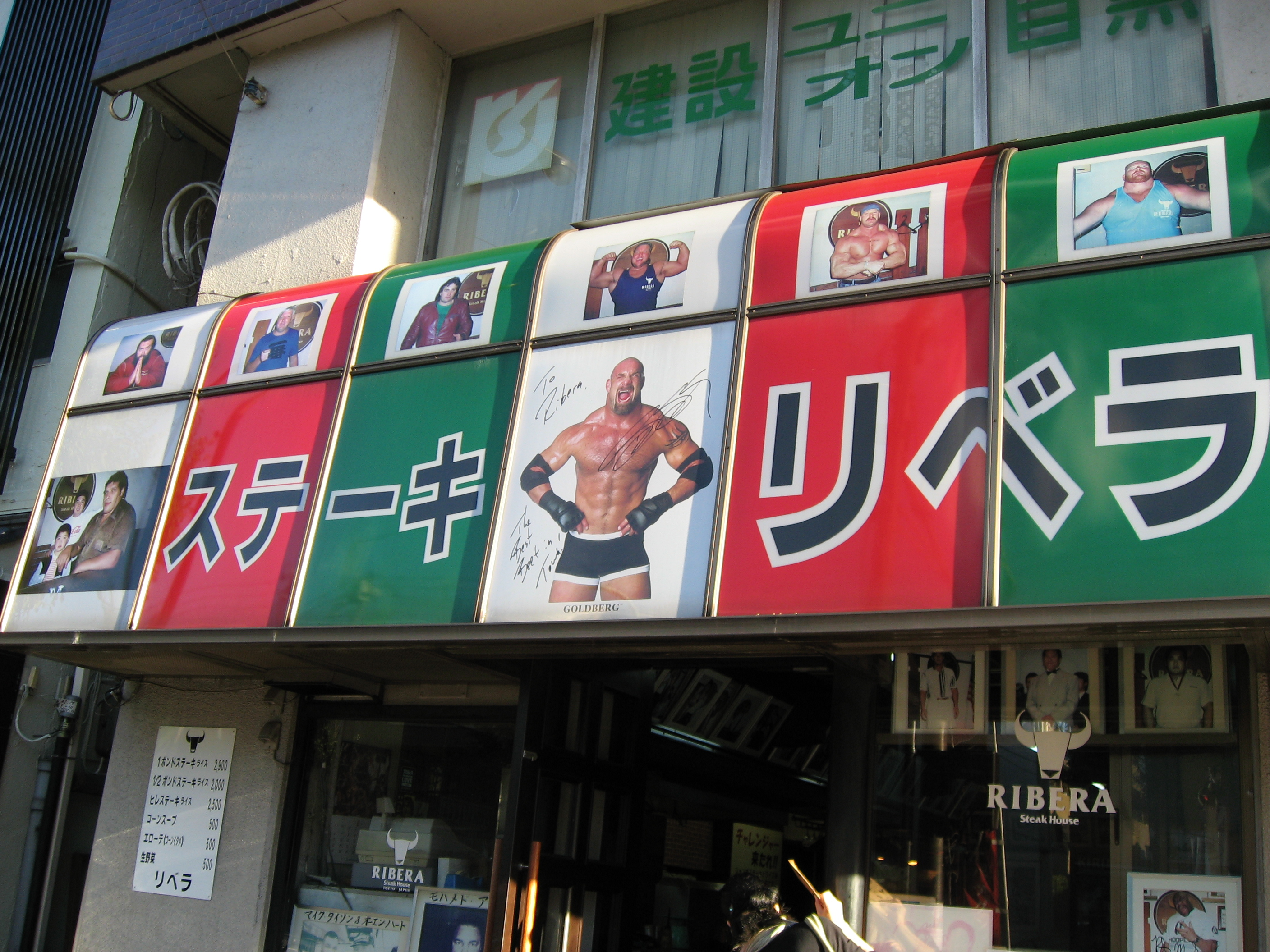
- A shot of one side of the exterior of the Meguro location
- Interactive map of Ribera Steakhouse

Restaurant information
- Food type: Steak house
- Location: Gotanda, Japan
- Other locations: Shimomeguro

Ribera Steakhouse (ステーキハウス リベラ, Stēkihausu Ribera) is a Japanese professional wrestling, boxing and mixed martial arts-themed steak house restaurant with two locations. The original location is in Gotanda, and there is a second, larger location in Shimomeguro. Professional wrestlers frequent the restaurant when touring in Tokyo, a rite of passage in the wrestling community. In addition, some wrestlers receive a complimentary satin Ribera Steakhouse Jacket from the owners.

== History ==
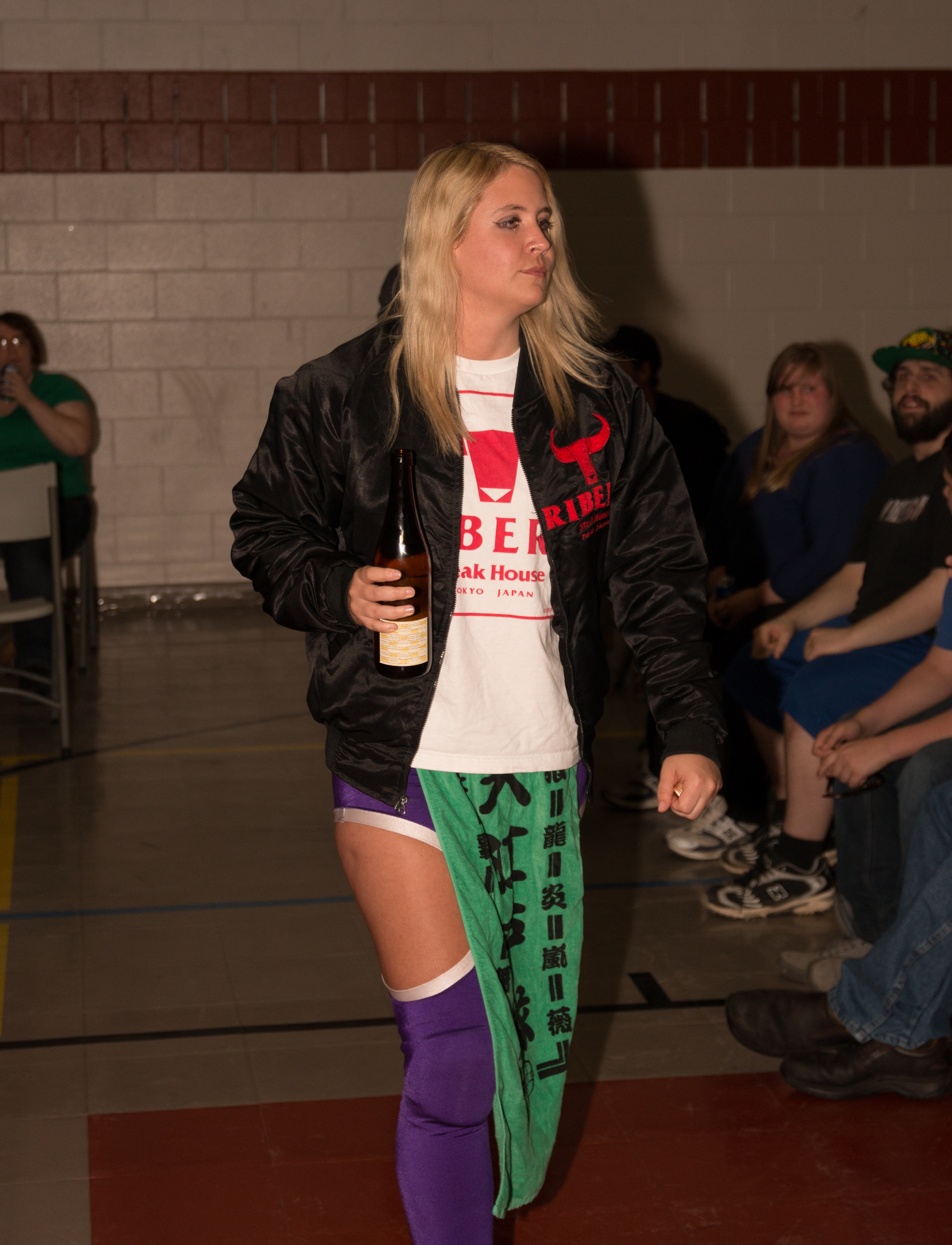
Wrestler Kaitlin Diemond wearing a black satin Ribera Steakhouse jacket

Stan Hansen credits Bruiser Brody with being the first American wrestler to discover the restaurant. In the late 1970s and early 1980s, American professional wrestlers began to frequent the restaurant when they were wrestling in Tokyo. Over time, the owner began to cover the walls with hundreds of pictures of the wrestlers who ate at his restaurant. The owner rotates the pictures to correlate with the wrestlers currently touring the country. The restaurant is also decorated with other sorts of memorabilia such as title belts and trophies.

The owners of Ribera Steakhouse give out the Ribera Steakhouse Jacket to selected patrons. The jacket is satin and has a bull logo on the breast. Road Warrior Animal popularized wearing the jacket with Zubaz pants. Later, it became a rite of passage for American wrestlers to go to the steakhouse and receive their own jacket. Ricky Fuji has said that in English Ribera means, "I'm a wrestler, and I've been to Japan".

The restaurant features New York-style steaks in three sizes—1/2 pound, 1 pound, and 1 1/2 pounds—and sides such as corn, rice, salad, and soup. There is also a Ribera Akebono eating challenge. The challenger must eat 1.35 kilograms of steak and several side dishes in under 30 minutes to win 10,000 yen (approximately US$73 as of June 2022).

A second and bigger location was built in Shimomeguro, and it is run by the original location's owner's son.

== See also ==
- Professional wrestling in Japan
- Dropkick Bar
