= Moe Nagata =

Japanese basketball player

Moe Nagata 永田萌絵
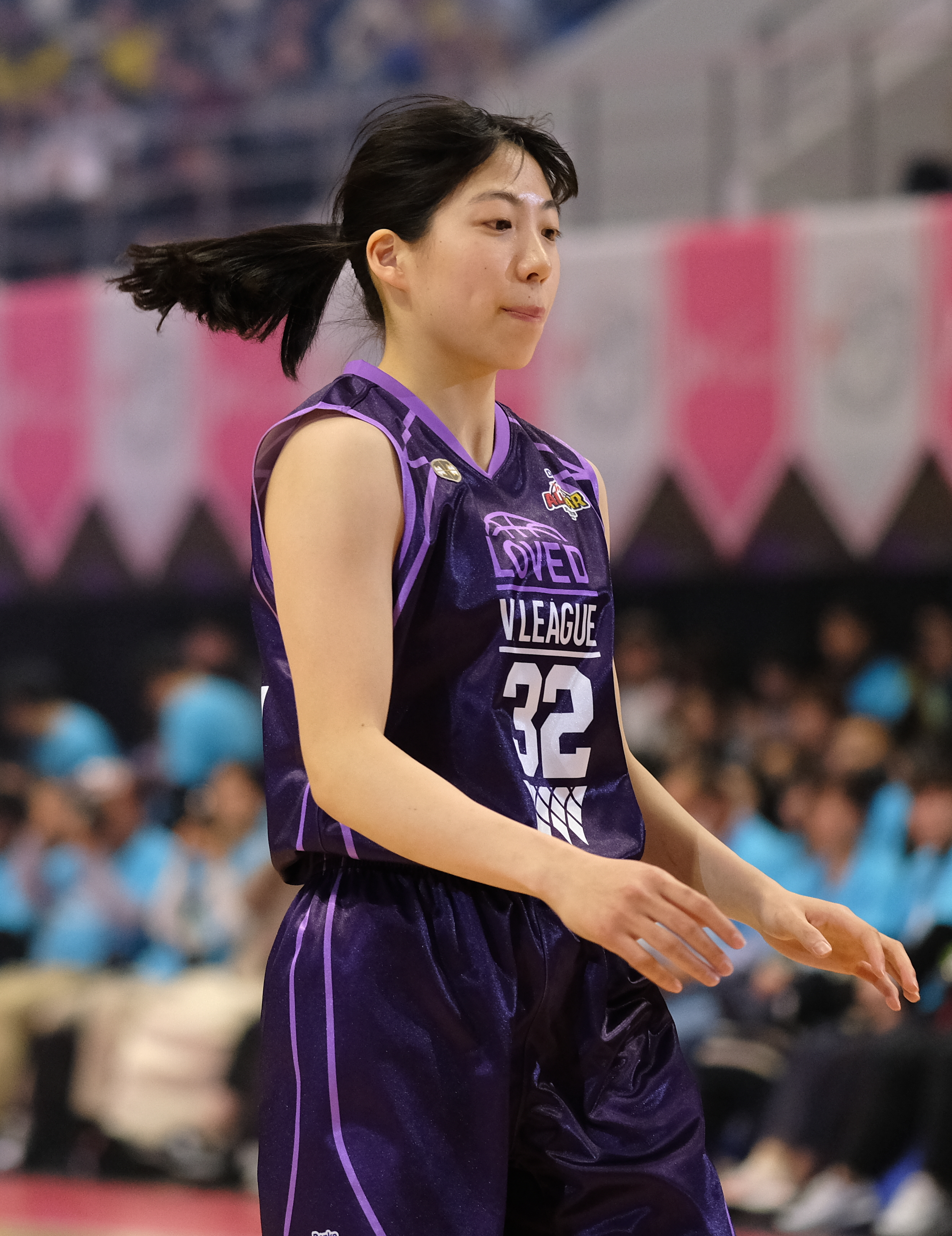

No. 12 – Cheongju KB Stars
- Position: F
- League: Women's Korean Basketball League (WKBL)

Personal information
- Born: June 20, 1997 (age 29) Sasebo, Nagasaki
- Listed height: 5 ft 8 in (1.73 m)
- Listed weight: 141 lb (64 kg)

Career information
- High school: Nagasaki Commercial (Nagasaki)
- College: Tokyo Healthcare University
- Playing career: 2020–present

Career history
- 2020-2021: Toyota Antelopes
- 2022-2024: Denso Iris
- 2024-: Cheongju KB Stars

Career highlights
- Japanese College Champion
Medals
Women's basketball
Representing Japan
FIBA Asia Cup
Gold medal – first place	2021 Jordan
Asian Games
Bronze medal – third place	2018 Jakarta	Team
Women's 3x3 basketball
Representing Japan
FIBA 3x3 Under-23 World Cup
Gold medal – first place	2019 Lanzhou	Team

Moe Nagata (永田萌絵, Nagata Moe; born June 20, 1997) is a Japanese professional basketball player who plays for Denso Iris of the Women's Japan Basketball League. She also plays for Japan women's national 3x3 team. She brought the U23 national team to a gold medal at the FIBA 3x3 Under-23 World Cup in Lanzhou. This was Japan's very first world title in basketball.

== Career ==
Nagata started playing basketball at Sasebo City Kasuga Elementary School. She finished in the top 4 in Nagasaki Prefecture when she was at Sasebo City Shimizu Junior High School. She entered Nagasaki City Nagasaki Commercial High School and was selected as a candidate for the Japan Women's U-18 National Team in her third year in 2015. In high school, she participated in the National Sports Festival in her second and third years, but was unable to in the All Japan high school sports or the national high school basketball championship (Winter Cup). She entered Tokyo Healthcare University in 2018, and in her third year was selected to represent Japan B at the Asian Games, where she won a bronze medal. In her fourth year as captain, she won three intercollegiate championships in a row and was selected as MVP for two consecutive years.

In 2019, when she was in the same fourth year, she participated in the 3x3 U-23 World Cup as a member of the U-23 3x3 Women's Japan National Team and won the gold medal. The victory in this tournament is the first time that a Japanese team has won a world championship in all categories, male and female. In 2020, she received the Nagasaki Prefecture Sports Special Award.

In 2020, Nagata joined the Toyota Motor Antelopes as an early entry. She was a backup player for two seasons, 2020-21 and 2021-22, helping the team win the playoffs two years in a row. In August 2021, Nagata was selected as a candidate for the Japanese national team.

Wanting to play more games, she moved to Denso Iris in 2022. Denso Iris finished first in the 2022-23 regular season (Nagata played in all of 26 games) but lost to Eneos Sunflowers in the playoff semi-finals. Denso Iris finished second in the 2023-24 regular season (played in 18 of 26 games) and won the playoff semi-finals beating Eneos Sunflowers to advance to the finals, but lost to Fujitsu Red Wave and were runners-up.

Nagata left Denso Iris at the end of the 2023-24 season. At the beginning of the 2024-25 season, she joined the Cheongju KB Stars of the Women's Korean Basketball League (WKBL).
