= 2025 Women's Basketball League Asia =

2nd edition of Women's Basketball League Asia

Tournament details
- Host country: China
- City: Dongguan
- Dates: 23–28 September
- Teams: 6
- Venue: 1

Final positions
- Champions: (China) Guangdong Vermilion Birds (1st title)
- Runners-up: (Japan) Fujitsu Red Wave
- Third place: (South Korea) Busan BNK Sum
- Fourth place: (Mongolia) Ulaanbaatar Amazons

Tournament statistics
- Games played: 11
- MVP: Yang Shuyu (Guangdong Vermilion Birds)
- Top scorer: Chennedy Carter (Al-Ula) (29.0 ppg)
- Top rebounds: Queen Egbo (Al-Ula) (13.7 rpg)
- Top assists: Rui Machida (Fujitsu Red Wave) (9.5 apg)

Official website
- 2025 Basketball Champions League Asia

The 2025 Women's Basketball League Asia is the second edition of the premier Asian women's basketball club competition organised by FIBA Asia. The tournament was held at the Dongguan Sports Center in Dongguan, China from 23 to 28 September.

Sichuan Yuanda Meile were the defending champions, but did not defend their crown after failing to win the 2024–25 WCBA.

Guangdong Vermilion Birds won the tournament after defeating Fujitsu Red Wave 95–67 in the final.

== Format ==
6 teams, up from the 4 that took part in the inaugural edition, competed in 2 groups of three. After round robin play, the top two from each group advanced to the semifinals, where the winners played the final.

== Teams ==
The following teams qualified to the main tournament.

Team	Domestic league standings	Appearances
(China) Guangdong Vermilion Birds	2025 Women's Chinese Basketball Association champions	1st
(Chinese Taipei) Cathay Life Tigers	2025 Women's Super Basketball League champions	2nd
(Japan) Fujitsu Red Wave	2024–25 Women's Japan Basketball League champions	2nd
(South Korea) Busan BNK Sum	2024–25 Women's Korean Basketball League champions	1st
(Mongolia) Ulaanbaatar Amazons	2024–25 Women The League champions	1st
(Saudi Arabia) Al-Ula	—	1st

== Venue ==
On 12 August 2025, it was announced that the Dongguan Sports Center in Chengdu, China would host the tournament. The arena has a capacity of 16,133.

Dongguan	2025 Women's Basketball League Asia is located in China
Dongguan Sports Center	2025 Women's Basketball League Asia is located in China
Capacity: 16,133	2025 Women's Basketball League Asia is located in China

== Group phase ==
The schedule and grouping was announced on 27 August 2025. The timings of some of the games were adjusted due to Typhoon Ragasa hitting the host city, Dongguan, during the tournament.

All times are local (UTC+08:00)

=== Group A ===
Pos	Team	Pld	W	L	PF	PA	PD	Pts	Qualification
1	(China) Guangdong Vermilion Birds (H)	2	2	0	165	136	+29	4	Knockout stage
2	(Mongolia) Ulaanbaatar Amazons	2	1	1	162	172	−10	3	Knockout stage
3	(Chinese Taipei) Cathay Life Tigers	2	0	2	144	163	−19	2	5–6 classification match

Source: WBL Asia 2025
Rules for classification: 1) Points; 2) Head-to-head results; 3) Points difference; 4) Points scored.
(H) Hosts

23 September 2025
11:15

Boxscore

Guangdong Vermilion Birds (China)	90–74	(Mongolia) Ulaanbaatar Amazons
Scoring by quarter: 25–28, 28–16, 21–14, 16–16
Pts: Collier 22; Rebs: Chen 11; Asts: Yang L.W. 7		Pts: Robinson, My Truong 25; Rebs: Onolbataar 13; Asts: My Truong 5

Dongguan Sports Center, Dongguan
Attendance: 100
Referees: Glenn Cornelio (PHI), Chan Owe Shiong (MAS), Alexey Stepanenko (KAZ)

25 September 2025
19:30

Boxscore

Ulaanbaatar Amazons (Mongolia)	88–82	(Chinese Taipei) Cathay Life Tigers
Scoring by quarter: 16–24, 18–24, 28–19, 26–15
Pts: Robinson 30; Rebs: Robinson 10; Asts: three players 2		Pts: Han 22; Rebs: Han 6 Asts: Lo 5

Dongguan Sports Center, Dongguan
Attendance: 2,222
Referees: Preeda Muongmee (THA), Glenn Cornelio (PHI), Alexey Stepanenko (KAZ)

26 September 2025
19:30

Boxscore

Cathay Life Tigers (Chinese Taipei)	65–72	(China) Guangdong Vermilion Birds
Scoring by quarter: 12–13, 15–23, 10–23, 25–16
Pts: Han 15; Rebs: Potter 10; Asts: Han, Lo 3		Pts: Yang 18; Rebs: Ejiofor 15; Asts: three players 4

Dongguan Sports Center, Dongguan
Attendance: 1,000
Referees: Yevgeniy Mikheyev (KAZ), Chan Owe Shiong (MAS), Alexey Stepanenko (KAZ)

=== Group B ===
Pos	Team	Pld	W	L	PF	PA	PD	Pts	Qualification
1	(Japan) Fujitsu Red Wave	2	2	0	229	97	+132	4	Knockout stage
2	(South Korea) Busan BNK Sum	2	1	1	145	185	−40	3	Knockout stage
3	(Saudi Arabia) Al-Ula	2	0	2	127	219	−92	2	5–6 classification match

Source: WBL Asia 2025
Rules for classification: 1) Points; 2) Head-to-head results; 3) Points difference; 4) Points scored.

23 September 2025
09:00

Boxscore

Fujitsu Red Wave (Japan)	128–43	(Saudi Arabia) Al-Ula
Scoring by quarter: 28–6, 31–16, 32–13, 37–8
Pts: Hayashi, Miyazawa 22; Rebs: Miyazawa, Fujimoto 8 Asts: Machida 11		Pts: Carter 13; Rebs: Egbo 13; Asts: Khayyat 4

Dongguan Sports Center, Dongguan
Attendance: 122
Referees: Yevgeniy Mikheyev (KAZ), Preeda Muongmee (THA), Leong Chuen Wing (SGP)

25 September 2025
16:30

Boxscore

Al-Ula (Saudi Arabia)	84–91	(South Korea) Busan BNK Sum
Scoring by quarter: 13–16, 18–31, 24–34, 29–10
Pts: Carter 45; Rebs: Egbo 19; Asts: Egbo 6		Pts: Lee 23; Rebs: Kim S. 7 Asts: An 12

Dongguan Sports Center, Dongguan
Attendance: 1,000
Referees: Zhang Xiao (CHN), Suebpong Wichaiphin (THA), Jiang Wenan (CHN)

26 September 2025
16:30

Boxscore

Busan BNK Sum (South Korea)	54–101	(Japan) Fujitsu Red Wave
Scoring by quarter: 13–28, 15–23, 10–32, 16–18
Pts: Kim 13; Rebs: Byun, Park 4 Asts: three players 3		Pts: Fujimoto 19; Rebs: Fujimoto 7 Asts: Machida 10

Dongguan Sports Center, Dongguan
Attendance: 2,000
Referees: Glenn Cornelio (PHI), Preeda Muongmee (THA), Leong Chuen Wing (SGP)

== Final phase ==
=== Bracket ===
Semifinals
27 September
(China) Guangdong Vermilion Birds	91
(South Korea) Busan BNK Sum	56
27 September
(Japan) Fujitsu Red Wave	107
(Mongolia) Ulaanbaatar Amazons	83

Final
28 September
(China) Guangdong Vermilion Birds	95
(Japan) Fujitsu Red Wave	67
Third place
28 September
(South Korea) Busan BNK Sum	79
(Mongolia) Ulaanbaatar Amazons	74

==== 5–6 classification match ====
27 September 2025
13:30

Boxscore

Cathay Life Tigers (Chinese Taipei)	138–52	(Saudi Arabia) Al-Ula
Scoring by quarter: 32–19, 26–22, 34–8, 46–3
Pts: Hsu 26; Rebs: Hsiao 12; Asts: Huang 9		Pts: Carter 29; Rebs: Egbo 9 Asts: Egbo 2

Dongguan Sports Center, Dongguan
Referees: Zhang Xiao (CHN), Suebpong Wichaiphin (THA), Jiang Wenan (CHN)

==== Semifinals ====
27 September 2025
16:30

Boxscore

Fujitsu Red Wave (Japan)	107–83	(Mongolia) Ulaanbaatar Amazons
Scoring by quarter: 32–20, 16–20, 32–26, 27–17
Pts: Hayashi 29; Rebs: Miyazawa 6 Asts: Miyazawa, Fujimoto 6		Pts: Robinson 26; Rebs: Robinson 10; Asts: My Truong 7

Dongguan Sports Center, Dongguan
Referees: Yevgeniy Mikheyev (KAZ), Preeda Muongmee (THA), Chan Owe Shiong (MAS)

27 September 2025
19:30

Boxscore

Guangdong Vermilion Birds (China)	91–56	(South Korea) Busan BNK Sum
Scoring by quarter: 26–10, 28–17, 17–11, 20–19
Pts: Chen 17; Rebs: Ejiofor 9 Asts: Yang, Shen 7		Pts: Kim S. 21; Rebs: Kim M. 4 Asts: Sim, An 3

Dongguan Sports Center, Dongguan
Referees: Glenn Cornelio (PHI), Alexey Stepanenko (KAZ), Leong Chuen Wing (SGP)

==== Third place game ====
28 September 2025
16:00

Boxscore

Busan BNK Sum (South Korea)	79–74	(Mongolia) Ulaanbaatar Amazons
Scoring by quarter: 15–26, 20–16, 22–21, 22–11
Pts: Lee 30; Rebs: Kim S. 9 Asts: Kim, An 5		Pts: Robinson 29; Rebs: Onolbataar 12; Asts: My Truong 8

Dongguan Sports Center, Dongguan
Referees: Glenn Cornelio (PHI), Alexey Stepanenko (KAZ), Leong Chuen Wing (SGP)

==== Final ====
28 September 2025
19:00

Boxscore

Guangdong Vermilion Birds (China)	95–67	(Japan) Fujitsu Red Wave
Scoring by quarter: 18–16, 23–11, 25–15, 29–25
Pts: Yang 23; Rebs: Chen 10; Asts: Chen 7		Pts: Miyazawa 18; Rebs: Machida, Akagi 5 Asts: Machida 12

Dongguan Sports Center, Dongguan
Referees: Yevgeniy Mikheyev (KAZ), Preeda Muongmee (THA), Chan Owe Shiong (MAS)

== Final ranking ==
Rank	Team	Record
1st place, gold medalist(s)	(China) Guangdong Vermilion Birds	4–0
2nd place, silver medalist(s)	(Japan) Fujitsu Red Wave	3–1
3rd place, bronze medalist(s)	(South Korea) Busan BNK Sum	2–2
4th	(Mongolia) Ulaanbaatar Amazons	1–3
5th	(Chinese Taipei) Cathay Life Tigers	1–2
6th	(Saudi Arabia) Al-Ula	0–3

== Awards ==
The awards were announced after the final on 28 September.

2025 Women's Basketball League Asia winner

Guangdong Vermilion Birds
1st title

Most Valuable Player
(China) Yang Shuyu

=== All-Star Five ===
Pos	Player	Club
G	(China) Yang Shuyu (MVP)	(China) Guangdong Vermilion Birds
F	(China) Huang Sijing	(China) Guangdong Vermilion Birds
C	(Japan) Aki Fujimoto	(Japan) Fujitsu Red Wave
F	(Japan) Yuki Miyazawa	(Japan) Fujitsu Red Wave
G	(Romania) Sonia Ursu-Kim	(South Korea) Busan BNK Sum
