= Gotanda =

District of Tokyo, Japan

Coordinates: 35°37′33″N 139°43′25″E

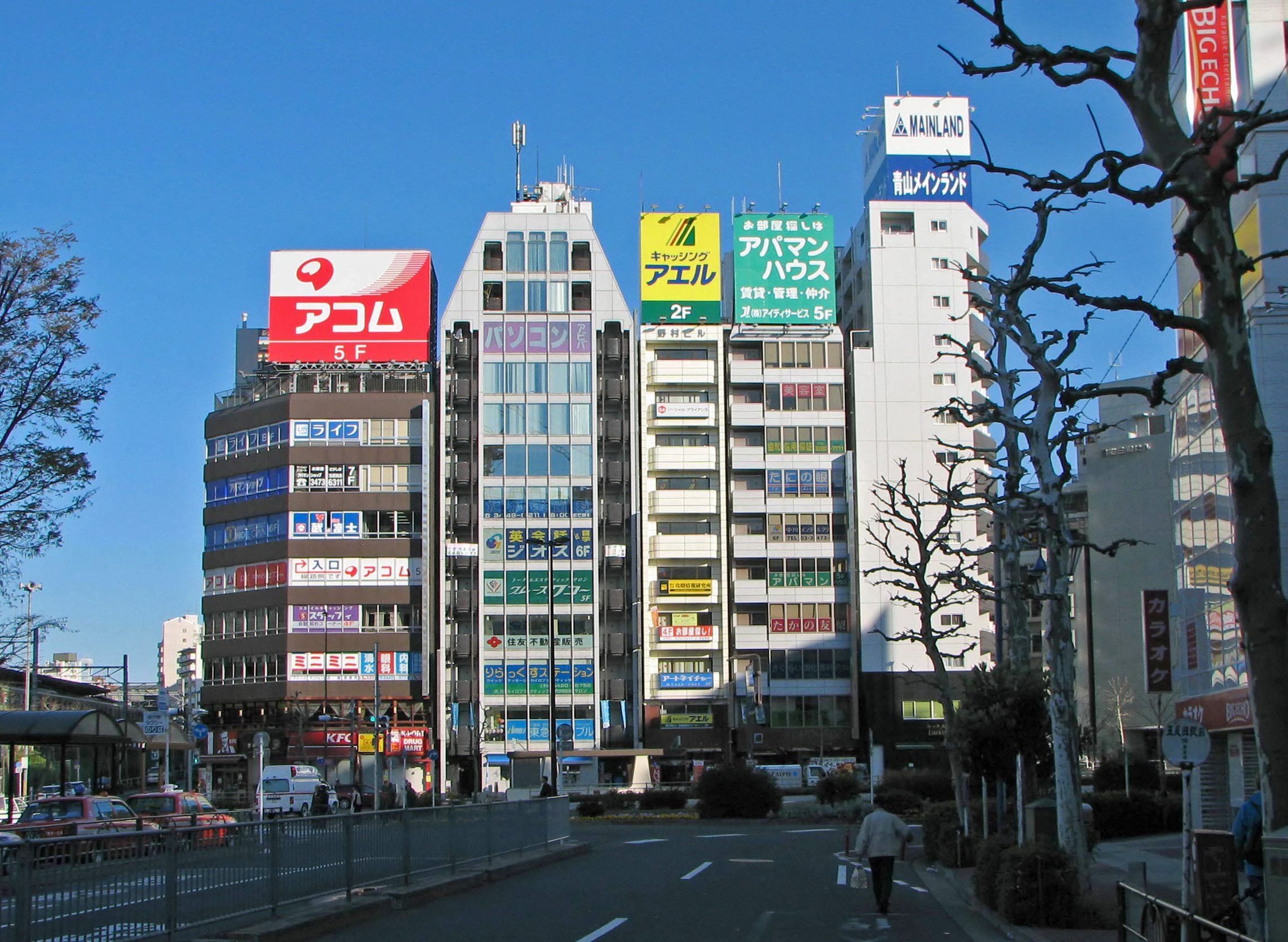
Gotanda buildings

Gotanda (五反田) is a district in the Shinagawa ward of Tokyo, Japan. The district straddles the Meguro River, and is located between the Meguro and Ōsaki stations on the JR Yamanote Line.

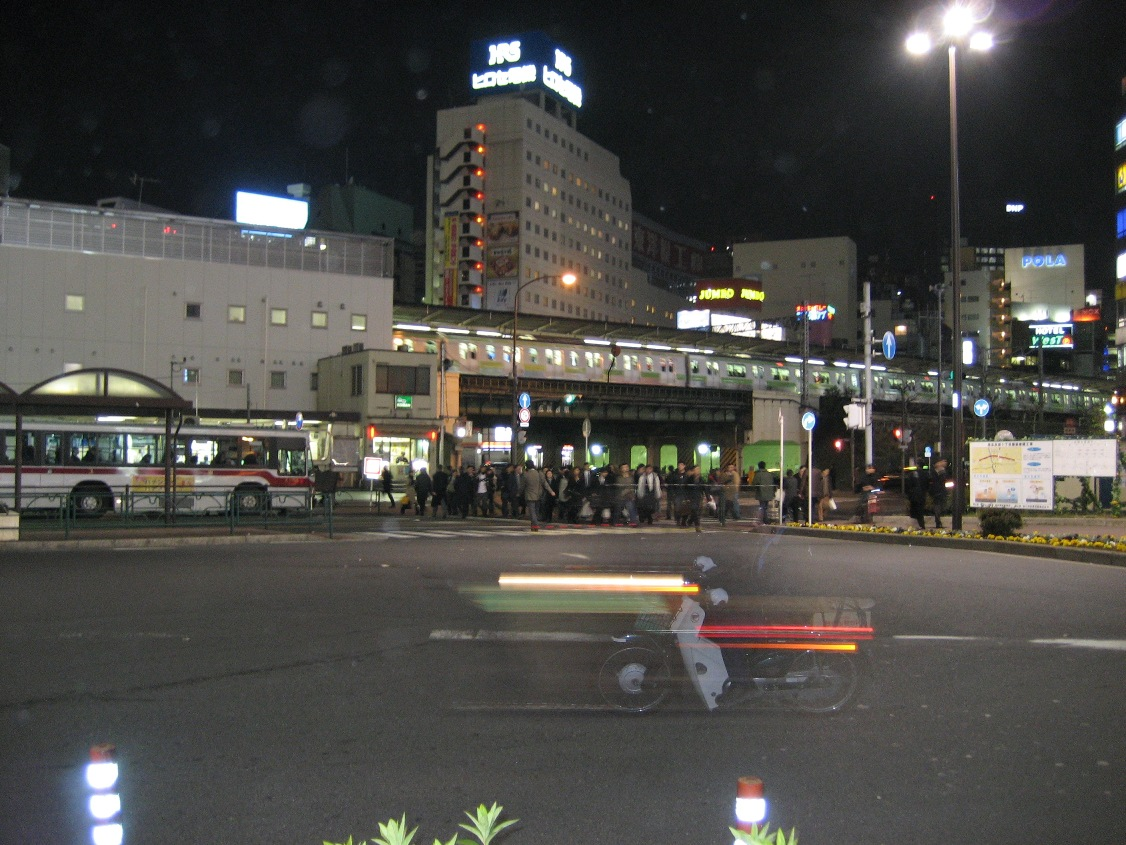
Gotanda Station

The district is centered on Gotanda Station, which is served by the Toei Asakusa Line and the elevated Tōkyū Ikegami Line as well as the Yamanote line. In the Tokyo road network, it is located at the crossings of Japan National Route 1 (Sakurada Avenue / Dai-Ni Keihin), the Central Circular Route (Expressway C2), and Tokyo Metropolitan Route 317 (Yamate Street).

== District profile ==
The JR loop divides the district in half, with Higashi (East) Gotanda lying inside the Yamanote loop, while Nishi (West) Gotanda is outside the loop. Nishi-Gotanda is largely residential, with moderately sized apartment buildings close to the JR station and quiet streets in the outer areas. Higashi-Gotanda is home to Seisen University, NTT Medical Center Tokyo, several temples and shrines, and many office buildings. Higashi-Gotanda also has many hotels, including some capsule hotels. The global headquarters of Sony were previously located along Sony Dōri on the eastern edge of Higashi-Gotanda, but most of the complex has moved to adjacent Shinagawa, Minato Ward.

One of Tokyo's busy major avenues, Sakurada Dōri — a part of National Route 1, passes through both halves of Gotanda, carrying traffic between the inner business districts ringing the Imperial Palace grounds and the outlying areas of Shinagawa-ku, Ōta-ku and beyond that the city of Yokohama.

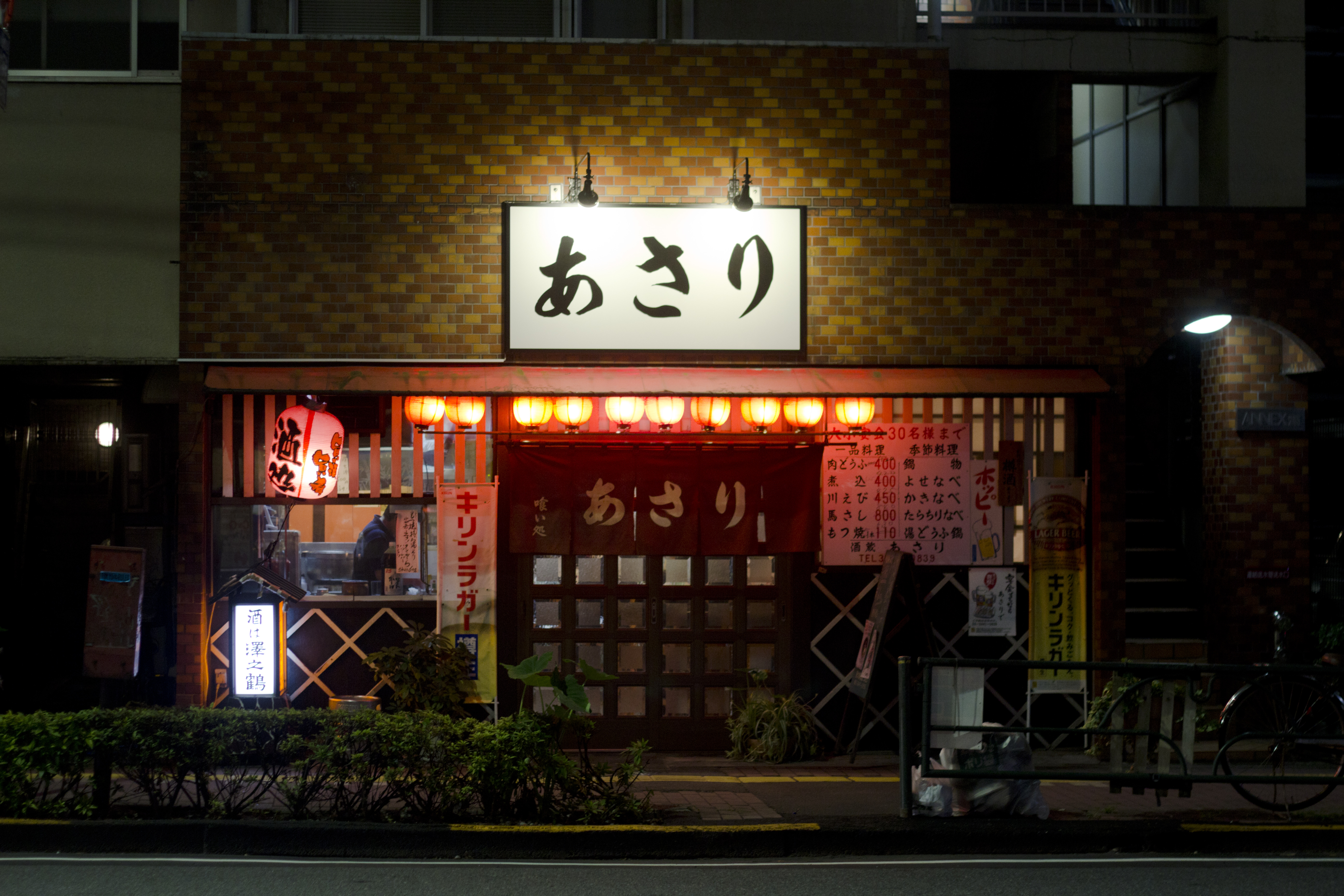
An izakaya near Gotanda station

The area is home to the embassies of Belarus, Indonesia, and North Macedonia, and the Consulates General of Brazil and Peru. Educational and medical institutions in the area include Seisen University, Tokyo Health Care University and NTT Medical Center Tokyo. Corporations with their headquarters in Gotanda include Allied Telesis, Comsys, Gakken, and Imagica.

Gotanda is one of several red-light districts in Tokyo.

== History ==
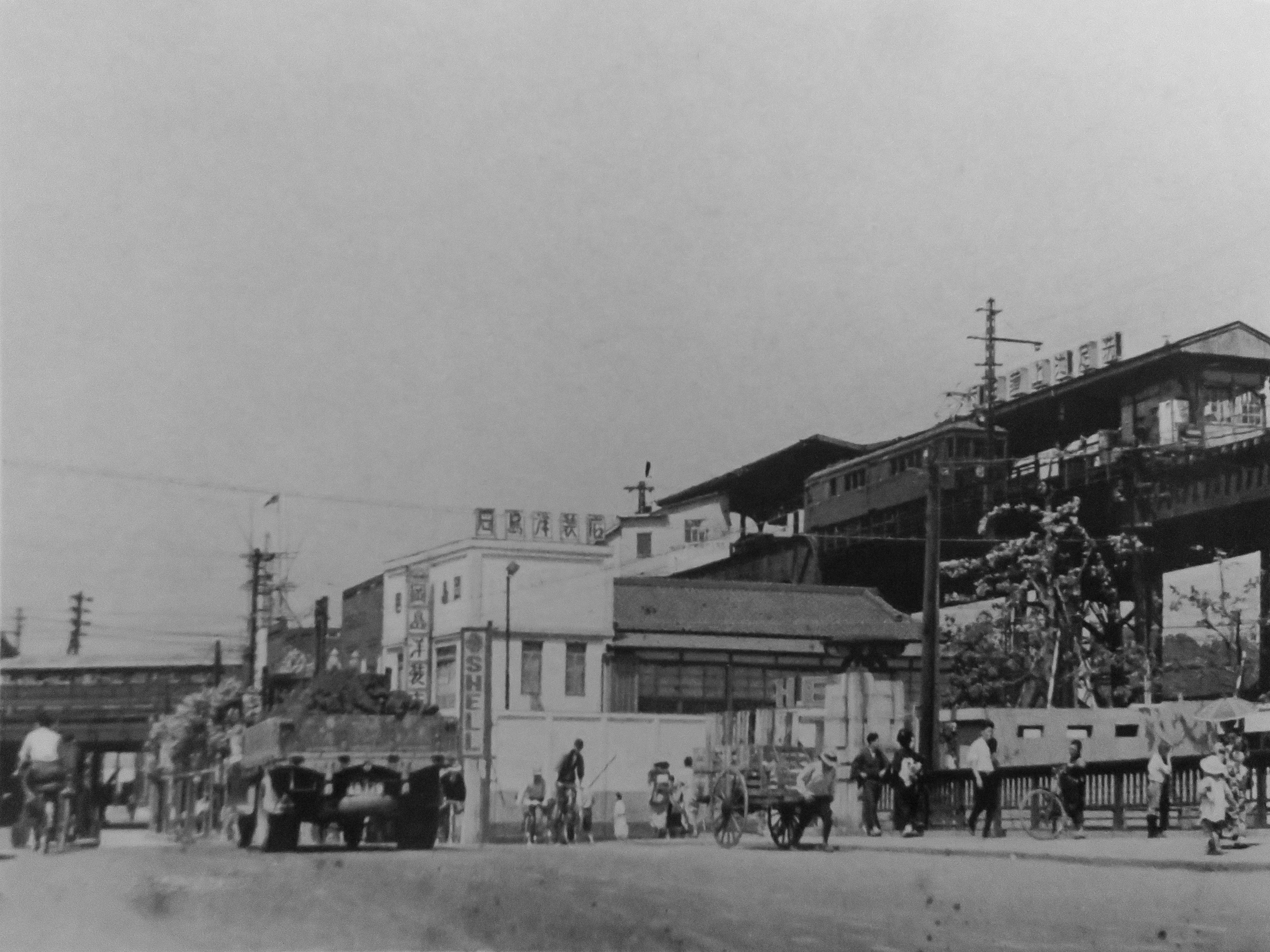
Gotanda Station in 1936

The name Gotanda literally means "five-tan (approx. 5,000 m^{2}) rice paddy" and is said to come from the standard size of rice paddies in the area. Gotanda was a rural rice farming area on the Meguro River through the Edo era and Meiji era; it began to urbanize with the opening of Gotanda Station on the Yamanote Line in 1911.

Gotanda grew quickly in the 1920s, having been re-zoned to accommodate restaurants and nightlife establishments in 1921. This growth was further spurred by the Great Kanto Earthquake of 1923, which destroyed the traditional downtown area of eastern Tokyo and made the railway stops of western Tokyo more popular locations for business development. Tokyu Railway began private commuter rail service from Gotanda in 1928.

The northern area of Gotanda, known as Ikedayama (池田山), housed the Edo residence of the Ikeda clan during the Edo era, and developed into an affluent residential community in the 1910s and 1920s.

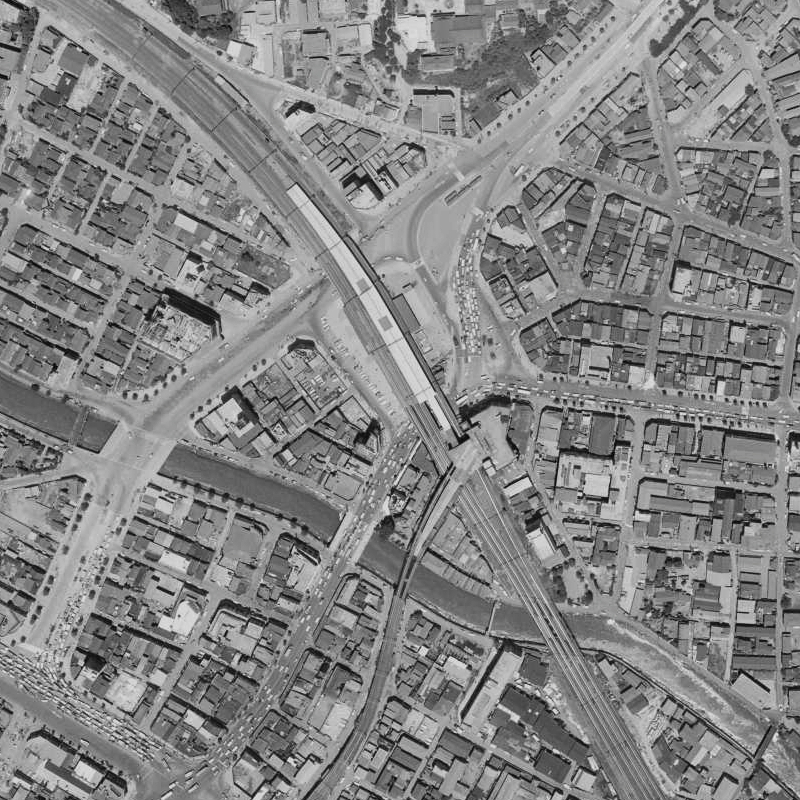
Aerial view of central Gotanda in 1963

After World War II, a black market developed to the north of the Tokyu station, and numerous love hotels were built in the area. Gotanda became a popular after-work nightlife destination for industrial workers employed in factories around nearby Osaki Station.

After factories in the area began to shut down in the 1970s, Tokyo designated the Gotanda and Osaki areas as an urban redevelopment zone in 2002, paving the way for new high-rise commercial and residential developments in the 2000s and 2010s, including a redevelopment of the JR and Tokyu stations.

In the 2010s, Gotanda became a popular alternative to Shibuya among IT start-up companies due to its convenience and relatively low rent costs. The Gotanda Valley Association was founded by six companies in 2018 and grew to 30 members by 2019.
