= Tokyo Healthcare University =

Private university in Tokyo, Japan

Coordinates: 35°37′53″N 139°43′35″E

- 東京医療保健大学
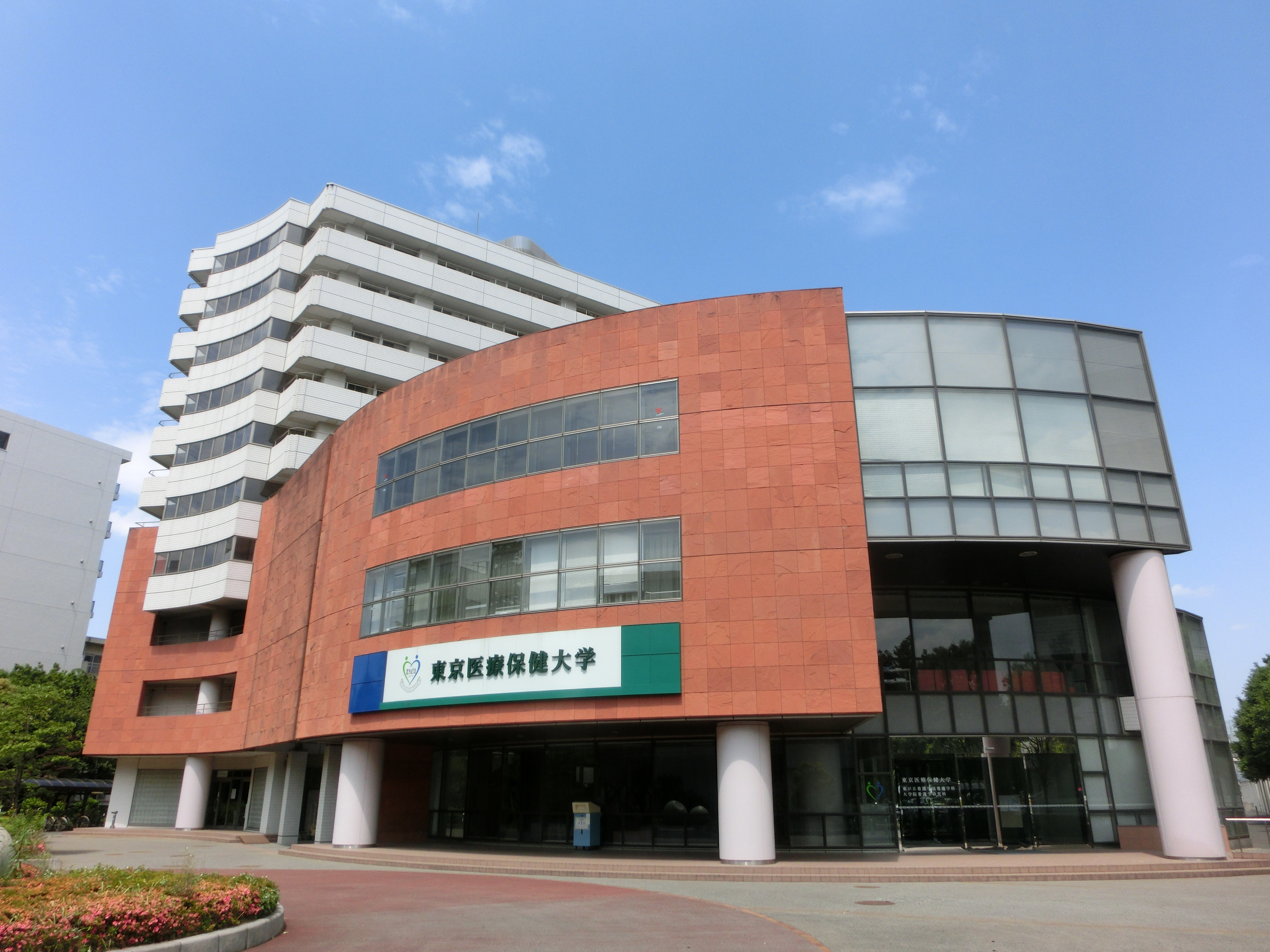
- National Hospital Organization Campus
- Former name: Aobagakuen Junior College
- Type: Private university
- Established: 2005
- President: Satoshi Kimura, M.D.
- Faculty: 231 (full time), 224 (part time)
- Administrative staff: 96
- Students: 2,539
- Undergraduates: 2,378
- Postgraduates: 161
- Location: Shinagawa, Tokyo, Japan
- Website: www.thcu.ac.jp/english/

Tokyo Healthcare University (東京医療保健大学, Tōkyō Iryō Hoken Daigaku) is a private university headquartered in Shinagawa, Tokyo, Japan.

The university offers health professional education programs in undergraduate and graduate levels.

== History ==
The predecessor of the university, Aobagakuen Junior College, was established as a women's two-year junior college in 1966. It became coeducational in 2001 and it was reorganized into a four-year university in 2005.

== Campuses ==
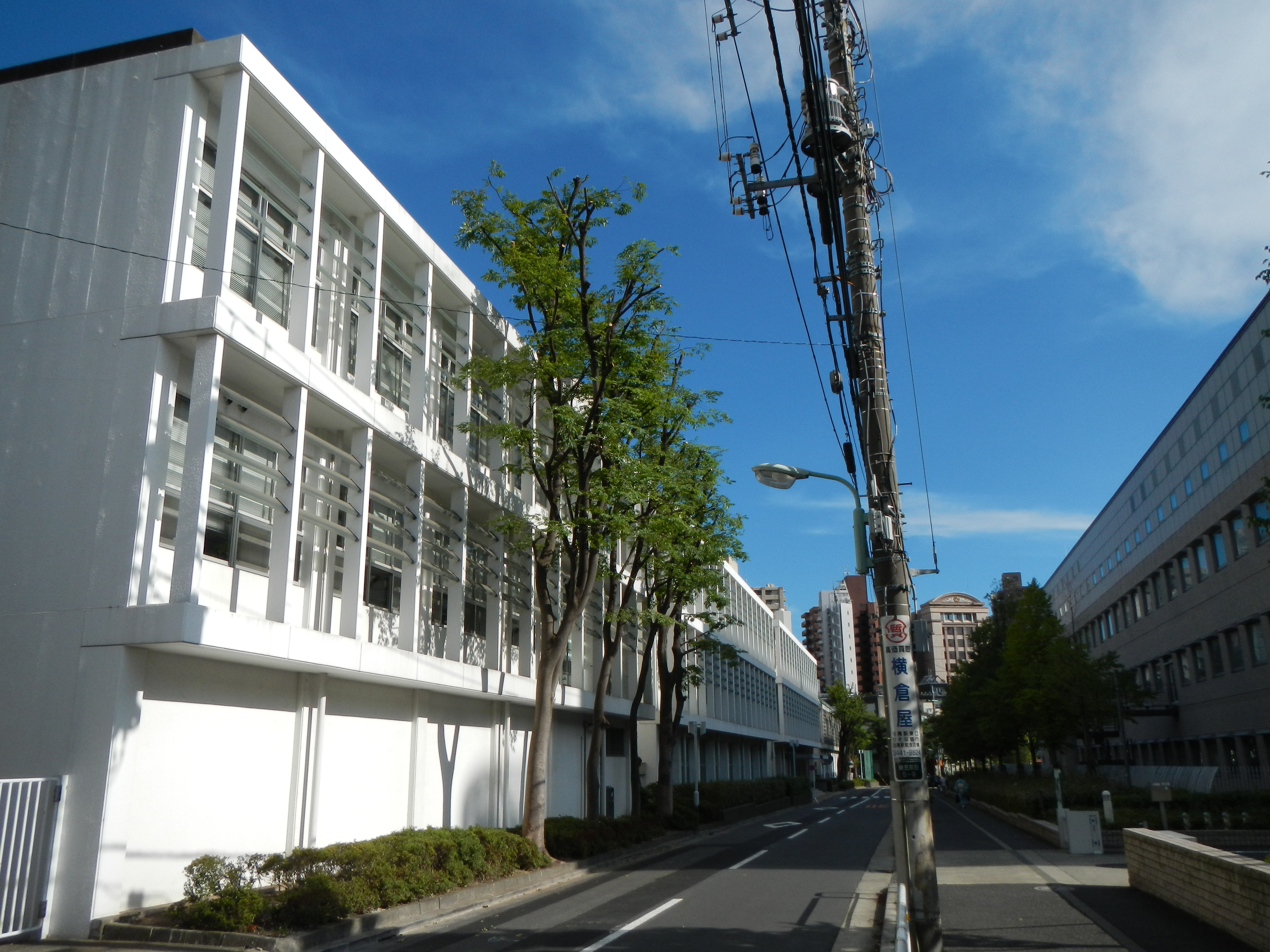
Gotanda Campus

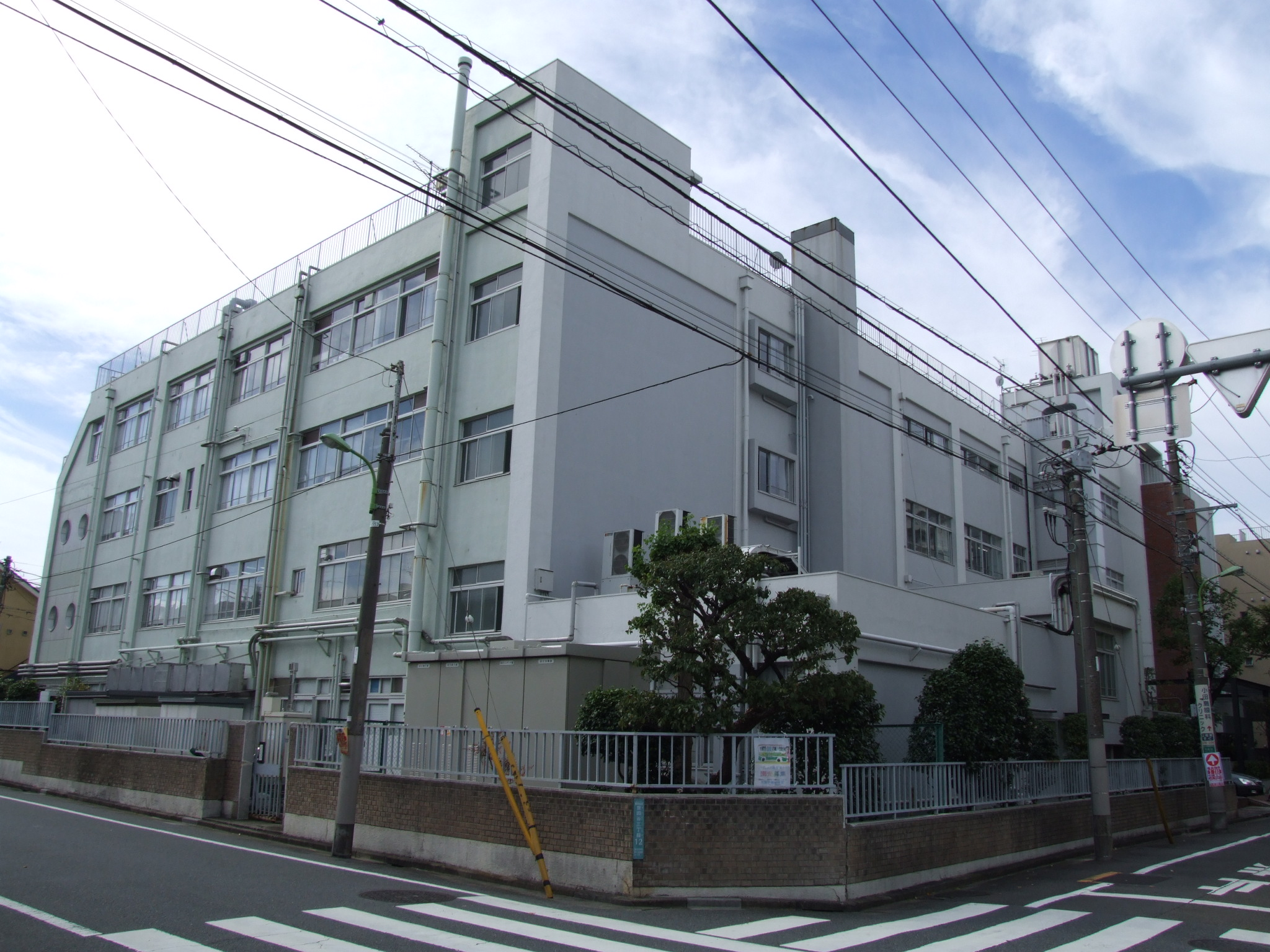
Setagaya Campus

- Gotanda Campus: Higashigotanda, Shinagawa, Tokyo
- Setagaya Campus: Setagaya, Tokyo
- National Hospital Organization (Kokuritsu Byōin Kikō) Campus: Meguro, Tokyo
- National Hospital Organization Tachikawa Campus: Tachikawa, Tokyo
- Funabashi Campus: Funabashi City, Chiba Prefecture
- Onominato Campus: Wakayama City, Wakayama Prefecture
- Japanese Red Cross Wakayama Medical Center (Nisseki Wakayama Iryō Center) Campus: Wakayama City, Wakayama Prefecture

== Organization ==
=== Undergraduate schools ===
The university has five divisions of nursing. Their entrance examinations and educations are conducted separately.

- Faculty of Healthcare: Gotanda and Setagaya Campus
  - Division of Nursing
  - Division of Medical Nutrition
  - Division of Healthcare Informatics
- Higashigaoka Faculty of Nursing: National Hospital Organization Campus
  - Division of Nursing
- Tachikawa Faculty of Nursing: National Hospital Organization Tachikawa Campus
  - Division of Nursing
- Chiba Faculty of Nursing: Funabashi Campus
  - Division of Nursing
- Wakayama Faculty of Nursing: Onominato and Japanese Red Cross Wakayama Medical Center Campus
  - Division of Nursing
- Department of Midwifery (one-year program): Gotanda Campus

=== Graduate schools ===
- Postgraduate School of Healthcare: Gotanda Campus
- Postgraduate School of Nursing: National Hospital Organization Campus
- Wakayama Postgraduate School of Nursing: Japanese Red Cross Wakayama Medical Center Campus
- Chiba Postgraduate School of Nursing: Funabashi Campus

== Notable alums ==
- Joshua Mfonobong Temitope (basketball player)
- Moe Nagata (basketball player)
