= Tokkei Security Hiratsuka General Gymnasium =

Sports venue in Hiratsuka, Japan

Coordinates: 35°20′29.5″N 139°20′19.2″E

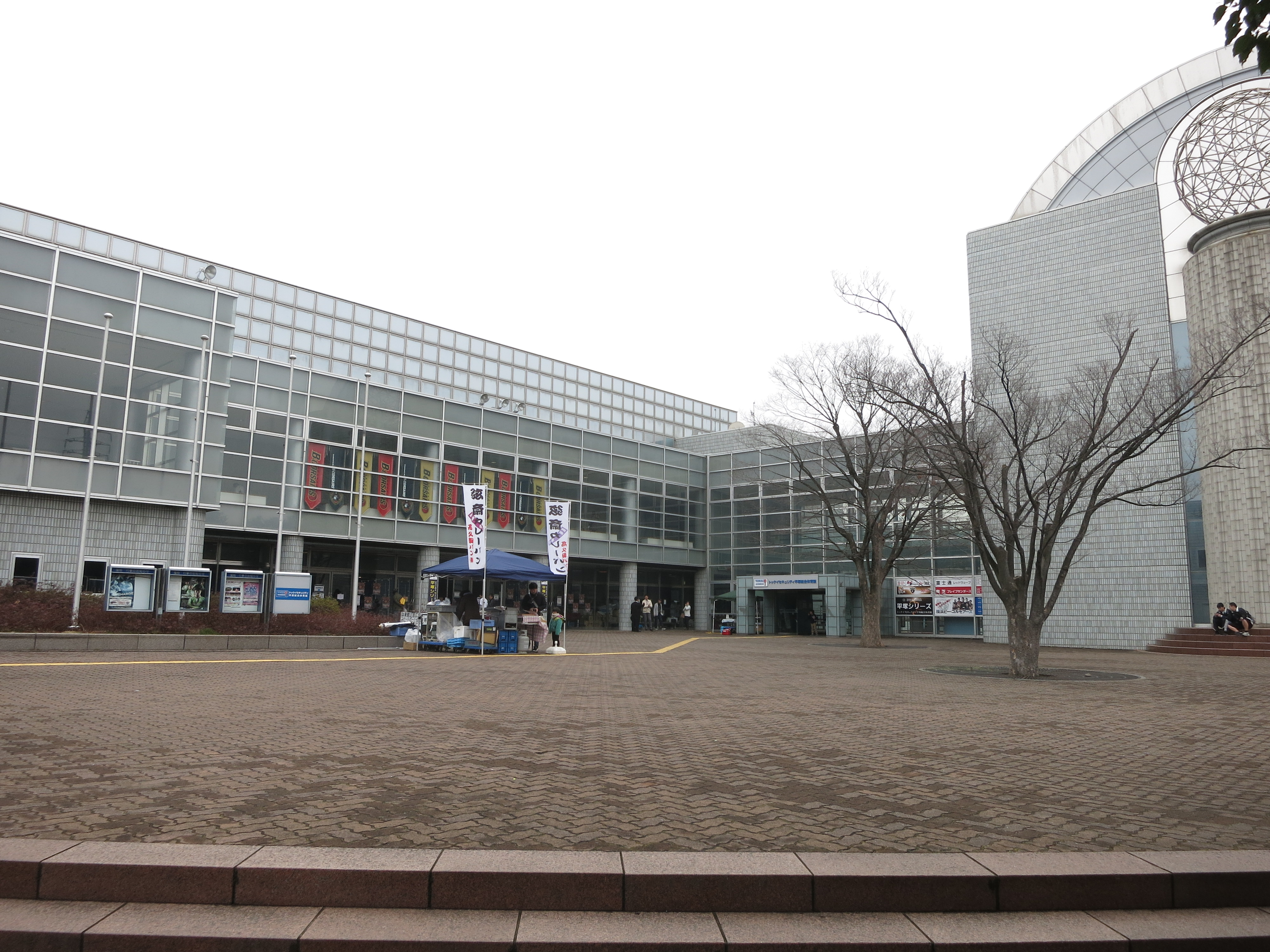

- Location within Kanagawa Prefecture Location within Japan
- Interactive map of Tokkei Security Hiratsuka General Gymnasium
- Full name: Hiratsuka General Gymnasium
- Location: Hiratsuka, Kanagawa, Japan
- Owner: Hiratsuka city
- Operator: Hiratsuka city

Construction
- Opened: October 5, 1982
- Cost

Tenant
- Fujitsu Red Wave

Website
- http://www.city.hiratsuka.kanagawa.jp/koen/page-c_00811.html

Tokkei Security Hiratsuka General Gymnasium is an arena in Hiratsuka, Kanagawa, Japan. This is an anime spot based on Slam Dunk (manga).

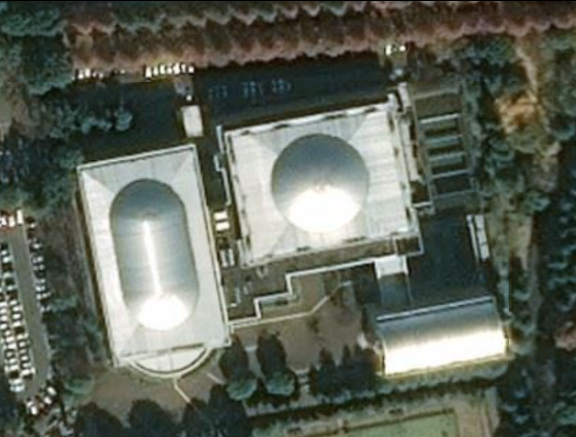
Satellite view
