= NTT Medical Center Tokyo =

Coordinates: 35°37′52.52″N 139°43′32.75″E

- NTT
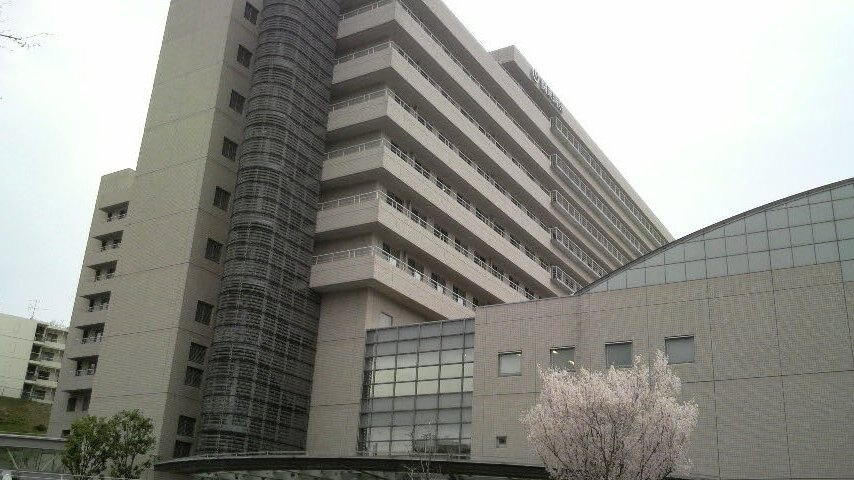

Geography
- Location: 5-9-22 Higashi-Gotanda, Shinagawa-ku, Tokyo, 141-8625, Japan

Organisation
- Care system: Private
- Type: Private

Services
- Beds: 592

History
- Opened: 1952

Links
- Website: www.ntt-east.co.jp/kmc/en/
- Lists: Hospitals in Japan

NTT Medical Center Tokyo (NTT東日本関東病院) is a private hospital located in the Gotanda district of Shinagawa, Tokyo, Japan. It was founded as Kanto Teishin Hospital for employees of the NTT Public Corporation in 1952, and was opened to the general public in 1986. The present hospital building was renovated in 2000. It was accredited by the Joint Commission International in 2011.
