= Joshua Mfonobong Temitope =

Nigerian basketball player

No. 8 – Fujitsu Red Wave
- Position: C
- League: Women's Japan Basketball League

Personal information
- Born: March 18, 2000 (age 26) Nigeria
- Listed height: 6 ft 3 in (1.91 m)
- Listed weight: 170 lb (77 kg)

Career information
- High school: Kochi Chuo High School
- College: Tokyo Healthcare University
- Playing career: 2023–present

Career history
- 2023-2024: Fujitsu Red Wave

Career highlights
- Women's Japan Basketball League Champion

Joshua Mfonobong Temitope (born March 18, 2000) is a Nigerian professional basketball player. She plays for Fujitsu Red Wave of the Women's Japan Basketball League (W-League). Her position is center.

== Career ==
Temitope was born in Nigeria. She entered Kochi Chuo High School in Kōchi, Japan as an international student in 2016. In 2017 (sophomore year) the school made its first appearance in the national high school basketball championship (Winter Cup), winning the first game and advancing to the second round. In 2018 (junior year) it was in the top 16 in the all Japan high school sports and top 8 in the Winter Cup. Temitope went on to Tokyo Healthcare University, where she won the All-Japan University Basketball Championship (Intercollegiate) four years in a row from 2019 (freshman year) to 2022 (senior year).

In January 2023, she joined Fujitsu Red Wave as an early entry.

In the 2023–24 season, Fujitsu finished first in the regular season and made the playoffs. They won the championship for the first time in 16 years, beating Chanson V-Magic in the semi-finals and Denso Iris in the finals. Temitope started in 23 of the 26 regular season games, all three playoff semi-finals, and all three playoff finals. She was voted third in the "25th W-League Regular Season" Awards Best 5 (Center), behind Maki Takada (Denso Iris) and Izodje Uche (Chanson V-Magic).
