= Mamiko Tanaka =

Japanese basketball player (born 1996)

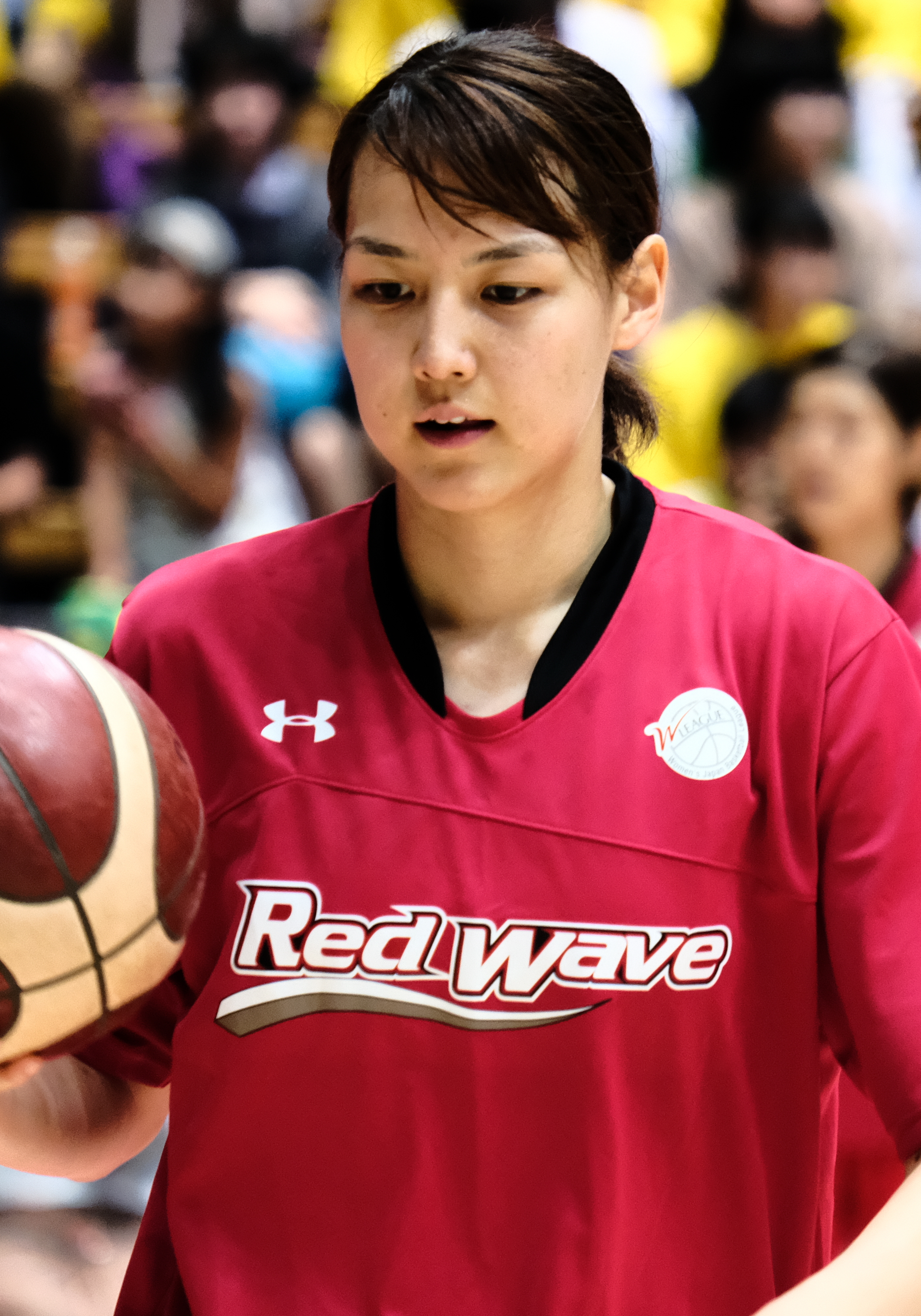
- Tanaka with the Fujitsu Red Wave in 2019

Personal information
- Born: 11 December 1996 (age 29) Mitaka, Tokyo, Japan
- Listed height: 180 cm (5 ft 11 in)
- Listed weight: 70 kg (154 lb)

Career information
- College: Waseda University
- Position: Power forward / center

Career history
- 2019–2023: Fujitsu Red Wave

Mamiko Tanaka (田中 真美子, Tanaka Mamiko; born 11 December 1996) is a former Japanese professional basketball player. She played four seasons for the Fujitsu Red Wave of the Women's Japan Basketball League from 2019 to 2023. She represented Japan at the international youth and collegiate level.

== Early life ==
Tanaka was born in Mitaka, Tokyo. Her brother, Shinichi Tanaka, is a professional rugby player. She started playing basketball at Hino Daiichi Junior High School and played in high school at Tokyo Seitoku University Junior & Senior High School. She played college basketball at Waseda University.

== Professional career ==
Tanaka joined the Fujitsu Red Wave of the Women's Japan Basketball League (W League) in April 2019. She was converted to play as a forward after previously playing the center position. She said her strengths included offensive rebounding and making plays and wanted to improve her three-point shooting in the new position. In her 12 games that season, she averaged 9.4 minutes, 3.3 points, and 3.6 rebounds per game as the team went 13–3 overall. In the 2021–22 season, she averaged 6.8 points and 4.2 rebounds in 18.8 minutes, playing every game as the team went 13–6.

Tanaka averaged 4.2 points and 2.9 rebounds in 13.3 minutes per game in 2021–22. She was invited to her first W League All-Star Game to take part in the event's 3x3 match and was added to the main game as a reserve. The Red Wave went 17–3 in the regular season and reached the playoff finals but were swept by the Toyota Antelopes.

Tanaka averaged 24 minutes, 7.8 points, and 6.0 rebounds per game in 2022–23. She earned a spot in the W League All-Star Game for a second time, and Red Wave coach BT Toews said she was the team's most improved player that season. She recorded a double-double with 10 points and 11 rebounds in the final game of the regular season. In the playoffs, the Red Wave lost to the Eneos Sunflowers in the quarterfinals. Tanaka retired at the end of the season.

== International career ==
Tanaka represented Japan at the international youth level at the 2011 FIBA Asia Under-16 Championship, the 2012 FIBA Under-17 World Championship, and the 2014 FIBA Asia Under-18 Championship. While in college, she played with the national under-24 team and won silver for Japan at the 2017 Summer Universiade in Taiwan, where she averaged 20.8 minutes, 8.2 points, and 4.8 rebounds per game. She competed again at the 2019 Summer Universiade. She trained with the national 3x3 team in preparation for the 2021 FIBA 3x3 Women's Olympic Qualifying Tournament but did not make the final roster, though she traveled with the team to the event.

== Personal life ==
Tanaka is married to professional baseball player Shohei Ohtani. Ohtani announced on Instagram in February 2024 that he had married a Japanese woman but did not disclose her identity. He said in an interview that she was "a normal Japanese woman" he had known for three or four years. He revealed her identity the next month by posting a photograph of himself with Tanaka. They traveled together to Korea that month, and Tanaka was photographed in the stands of the Gocheok Sky Dome during a practice game between the Dodgers and the Korean national team. In April 2025, the couple welcomed their first child, a daughter. In June 2026, they welcomed a second child, a son.

== Career statistics ==
Legend
GP	Games played	MPG	Minutes per game	FG%	Field goal percentage
3P%	3-point field goal percentage	FT%	Free throw percentage	RPG	Rebounds per game
APG	Assists per game	SPG	Steals per game	BPG	Blocks per game
PPG	Points per game	**Bold**	Career high		Led the league

Year	Team	League	GP	MPG	FG%	3P%	FT%	RPG	APG	SPG	BPG	PPG
2019–20	Fujitsu Red Wave	W League	12	9.4	**.619**	.273	.714	3.6	0.3	0.4	0.5	3.3
2020–21	Fujitsu Red Wave	W League	19	18.8	.586	.282	.577	4.2	**0.7**	0.8	**0.9**	7.9
2021–22	Fujitsu Red Wave	W League	19	13.3	.477	**.313**	**.800**	2.9	0.1	0.3	0.5	3.8
2022–23	Fujitsu Red Wave	W League	**28**	**24.0**	.477	.250	.696	**6.0**	**0.7**	**1.0**	**0.9**	**8.9**
