= Ulaanbaatar Amazons =

- Nickname: Amazons
- League: Women's The League
- Founded: 2019
- Location: Ulaanbaatar

The Ulaanbaatar Amazons (Mongolian: Улаанбаатар Амазонс) are a Mongolian women's basketball club based in Ulaanbaatar which plays in the Women's The League.

== History ==
The Ulaanbaatar Amazons was established as a 3x3 basketball team in 2019 with the intention to represent Mongolia internationally. The 3x3 team joined the FIBA 3x3 Women's Series in 2022, and is still competing as of 2026.

They began fielding a full 5x5 team when they joined the Women's The League, Mongolia's domestic women's league. They won the inaugural 2022–23 season. However they lost to the Khuleguud in the final of the 2023–24 season.

The Amazons retained the title in the 2024–25 season again, defeating Khuleguud in the final. They qualified for the 2025 Women's Basketball League Asia as the Mongolian champions. The team finished as second runners-up, losing to the Busan BNK Sum in the third place game.

Back in The League, the Amazons won their fourth title defeating Aravt in the 2025–26 season final.
