= Nishigotanda =

District of Shinagawa, Tokyo, Japan

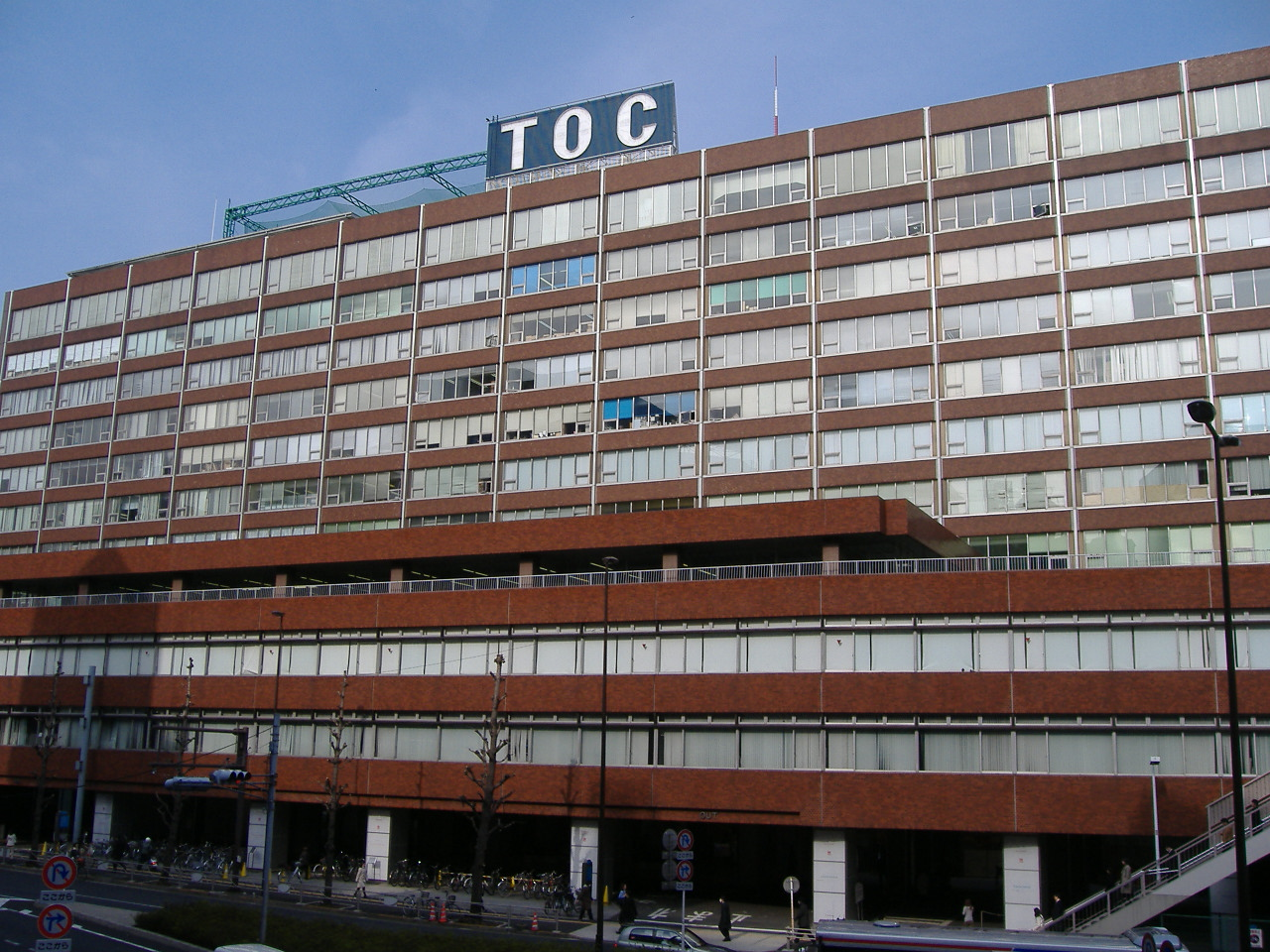
Toc Building

Nishigotanda (西五反田) is a district of Shinagawa, Tokyo, Japan. Nishigotanda is located at the northern part of Shinagawa. It consists of 1 to 8-chōme, and its total population is 20,187 (as of February 1, 2008).

Nishigotanda borders Kamiōsaki and Higashigotanda, Shinagawa on the northeast; Ǒsaki, Shinagawa on the east; Togoshi and Hiratsuka, Shinagawa on the southeast; Ebara, Shinagawa on the south; Koyama, Shinagawa on the southwest; Koyamadai, Shinagawa on the west; and Shimomeguro, Meguro on the northwest.

Pola Cosmetics is headquartered in Nishigotanda.

Nishigotanda 7-chome is home to the 13-story commercial building Toc Building. It houses an exhibition hall, a conference room, and a number of shops, including Office Depot, Uniqlo, Natural Lawson, ABC-Mart, Shop99, and Orihica.

== Education ==
Shinagawa City Board of Education operates public elementary and junior high schools.

Portions of Higashigotanda 1 and 2-chome are zoned to Hino Gakuen (日野学園) for elementary and junior high school. Other sections of 1-chome are zoned to Hosui Elementary School (芳水小学校) and No. 1 Hino Elementary School (第一日野小学校). Other portions of 2-chome are zoned to No. 1 Hino Elementary. Sections of 3-chome are zoned to No. 1 Hino, No. 3 Hino Elementary School (第三日野小学校), and No. 4 Hino Elementary School (第四日野小学校). All of 4-chome is zoned to No. 4 Hino Elementary. 5-chome is divided between No. 4 Hino and No. 1 Hino. All of 6 and 7-chome are zoned to No. 1 Hino. 8-chome is divided between No. 1 Hino and Hosui. All of Higashi-Gotanda is zoned to Hino Gakuen for junior high school.
