= Higashigotanda =

District in Shinagawa, Tokyo, Japan

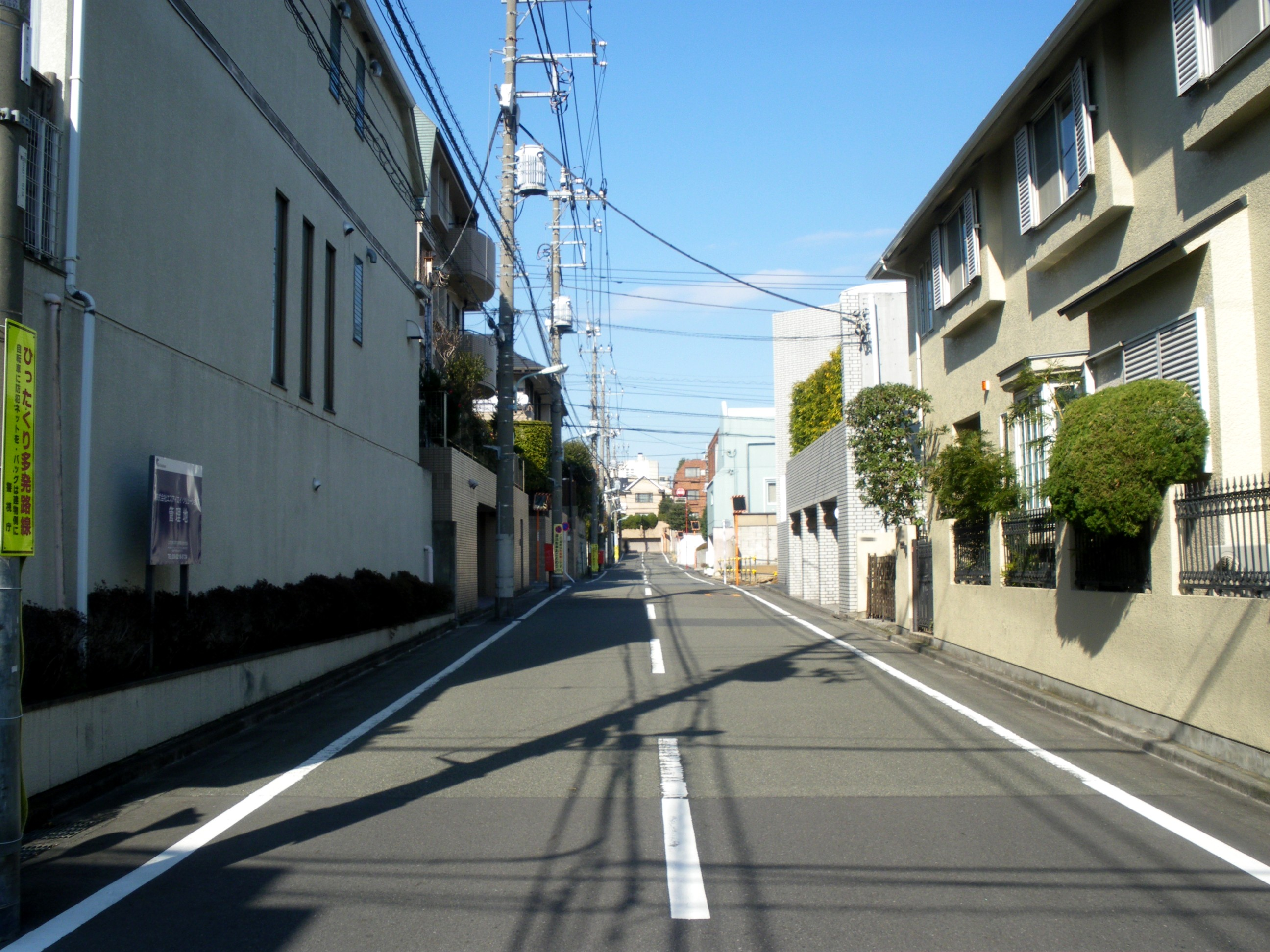
Ikedayama higashigotanda 5chome shinagawa

Higashigotanda (東五反田) is a district located at the northern part of Shinagawa, Tokyo, Japan. It consists of 1 to 5-chōme. As of February 1, 2008, the total population is 10,716.

Higashigotanda borders Kamiōsaki, Shinagawa and Shirokanedai, Minato on the north, Takanawa, Minato on the east, Kitashinagawa, Shinagawa on the southeast, Ōsaki, Shinagawa (across Meguro River) on the south, and Nishigotanda, Shinagawa (across JR Yamanote Line) on the west.

Gotanda Station is located in Higashigotanda 1-chōme.

Higashigotanda has several well-known upper-class residential districts including Shimazuyama (島津山) and Ikedayama (池田山), which roughly correspond to Higashigotanda 3-chōme and 5-chōme, respectively.

Higashigotanda is home to two private universities. Seisen University is located in Higashigotanda 3-chōme, and Tokyo Health Care University is located in Higashigotanda 4-chōme.

== Education ==
Shinagawa City Board of Education operates public elementary and junior high schools.

Hino Gakuen (日野学園) is the zoned combined elementary-junior high school for all of 1 and 3-chome and portions of 2 and 5-chome. It serves as the public junior high school only for 4-chome and the remainder of 5-chome, while 3rd Hino Elementary School (品川区立第三日野小学校) is the zoned elementary school for the aforementioned areas. Part of 2-chome is zoned to Gotenyama Elementary School (御殿山小学校) and Shinagawa Gakuen (品川学園) for junior high school.
