= Fujitsu Red Wave =

Basketball team based in Kawasaki, Kanagawa

Fujitsu Red Wave 富士通レッドウェーブ
- League: Women's Japan Basketball League
- Founded: 1985
- Arena: Todoroki Arena
- Location: Kawasaki, Kanagawa
- Website: sports.jp.fujitsu.com/redwave/
Home	Away

The Fujitsu Red Wave (富士通レッドウェーブ, Fujitsū Reddouēbu) are a Japanese professional basketball team based in Kawasaki, Kanagawa. The Red Wave compete in the "Premier" first division of the Women's Japan Basketball League (WJBL).

== Notable players ==
- Miwa Kuribayashi
- Rui Machida
- Ai Mitani
- Moeko Nagaoka
- Yōko Nagi
- Monica Okoye
- Mio Shinozaki
- Ayumi Suzuki
- Masami Tachikawa
- Mamiko Tanaka
- Joshua Mfonobong Temitope
- Chinatsu Yamamoto
- Ryoko Yano
- Yuki Miyazawa

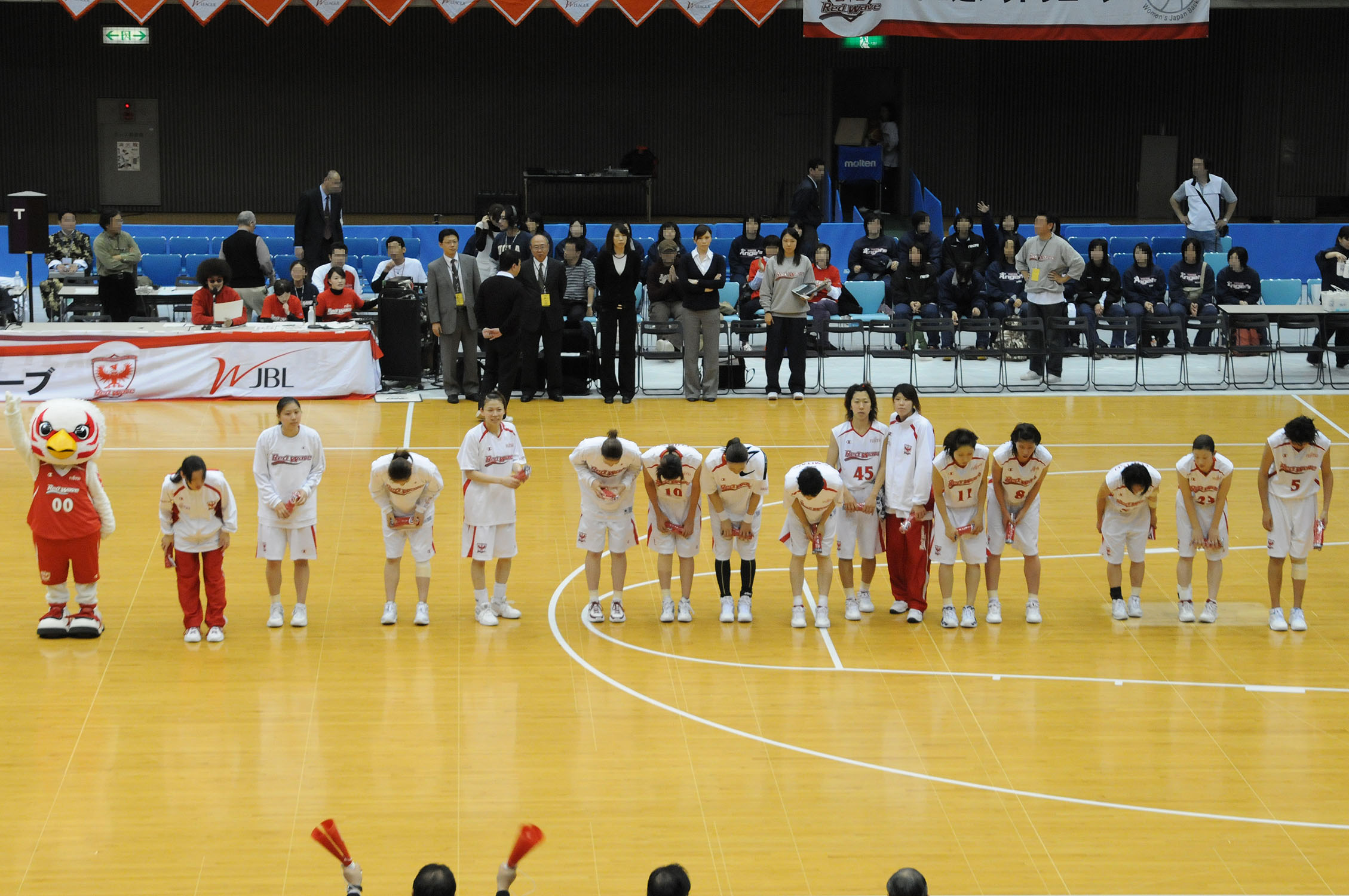

== Coaches ==
- Akemi Okazato
- Natsumi Yabuuchi
- BT Toews

== Venues ==
- Tokkei Security Hiratsuka General Gymnasium
- Yokohama Cultural Gymnasium
- Yokosuka Arena
