= 2013 FIBA Asia Under-16 Championship Qualification =

The 2013 FIBA Asia Under-16 Championship qualification was held in late 2012 and early 2013 with the Gulf region, West Asia, Southeast Asia, East Asia, Central Asia and South Asia each conducting tournaments.

== Qualification format ==
The following are eligible to participate:

- The organizing country.
- The champion team from the previous FIBA Asia Under-16 Championship.
- The four best-placed teams from the previous FIBA Asia Under-16 Championship will qualify the same number of teams from their respective sub-zones.
- The two best teams from the sub-zones.

== 2011 FIBA Asia Under-16 Championship ==
Rank	Team	Note
1st place, gold medalist(s)	China	Direct Qualifier
2nd place, silver medalist(s)	South Korea	East Asia (+1)
3rd place, bronze medalist(s)	Japan	East Asia (+2)
4	Philippines	Southeast Asia (+1)
5	Iraq	West Asia (+1)
6	Lebanon	
7	Indonesia	
8	Saudi Arabia	
9	Chinese Taipei	
10	India	
11	Qatar	
12	Vietnam	
13	Malaysia	
14	Uzbekistan	

== Qualified teams ==
Central Asia (1)	East Asia (1+2+2)	Gulf (2)	South Asia (1)	Southeast Asia (2+1)	West Asia (1+2+1)
Kazakhstan	China	Bahrain	India	Philippines	Iran
	Chinese Taipei	~~Saudi Arabia~~ *		Thailand	Jordan
	Hong Kong			Malaysia	Syria
	Japan				~~TBD~~ **
	South Korea				

* Withdrew.

** Only 3 teams registered from West Asia.

== Central Asia ==
The 2013 CABA Under-16 Championship was held at Shchuchinsk, Kazakhstan from June 26, 2013 . The winner teams qualifies for 2013 FIBA Asia Under-16 Championship.

Team	Pld	W	L	PF	PA	PD	Pts
Kazakhstan	1	1	0	87	34	+53	2
Uzbekistan	1	0	1	34	87	−53	1

June 26
17:00

Kazakhstan	87–34	Uzbekistan

Zhaksy Sports School, Shchuchinsk

== East Asia ==
All the others withdrew, so Chinese Taipei,Hong Kong,Japan,South Korea qualified automatically.

== South Asia ==
The 2013 SABA Under-16 Championship was held at Dakar, Bangladesh from July 3 to 5, 2013. The winner teams qualifies for 2013 FIBA Asia Under-16 Championship.

Team	Pld	W	L	PF	PA	PD	Pts
India	3	3	0	290	131	+159	6
Bangladesh	3	2	1	172	186	-14	5
Nepal	3	1	2	115	195	-80	4
Maldives	3	0	3	121	186	-65	3

July 3
17:00

India	95–50	Maldives

Dhanmondi Indoor Basketball Gymnasium, Dakar

July 3
18:30

Bangladesh	69–46	Nepal

Dhanmondi Indoor Basketball Gymnasium, Dakar

July 4
15:00

India	92–22	Nepal

Dhanmondi Indoor Basketball Gymnasium, Dakar

July 4
16:30

Bangladesh	44–37	Maldives

Dhanmondi Indoor Basketball Gymnasium, Dakar

July 5
15:00

Maldives	34–47	Nepal

Dhanmondi Indoor Basketball Gymnasium, Dakar

July 5
16:30

Bangladesh	59–103	India

Dhanmondi Indoor Basketball Gymnasium, Dakar

== Southeast Asia ==
The 2nd SEABA Under-16 Championship was held at Yogyakarta, Indonesia from July 14 to 18, 2013.The two best teams qualifies for 2013 FIBA Asia Under-16 Championship.

Rank	Team
Gold medal	Philippines
Silver medal	Thailand
Bronze medal	Malaysia
4	Indonesia
5	Singapore

== West Asia ==
The 2012 West Asian Under-15 Championship was held at Amman, Jordan from September 26 to 28, 2013. The three best teams excluding Iran qualifies for 2013 FIBA Asia Under-16 Championship.

Team	Pld	W	L	PF	PA	PD	Pts
Iran	3	3	0	205	143	+62	6
Lebanon	3	2	1	155	164	-9	5
Syria	3	1	2	172	163	+9	4
Jordan	3	0	3	131	193	−62	3

September 26
17:00

Lebanon	36–60	Iran

Prince Hamzah Hall, Amman

September 26
19:00

Jordan	36–56	Syria

Prince Hamzah Hall, Amman

September 27
17:00

Syria	54–60	Lebanon

Prince Hamzah Hall, Amman

September 27
19:00

Jordan	45–78	Iran

Prince Hamzah Hall, Amman

September 28
17:00

Iran	67–62	Syria

Prince Hamzah Hall, Amman

September 28
19:00

Jordan	50–59	Lebanon

Prince Hamzah Hall, Amman
