= 2019 FIBA U16 Asian Championship =

(Cancelled)

Tournament details
- Host country: Lebanon
- City: Beirut
- Dates: 5–12 April 2020
- Teams: 16 (from 1 confederation)
- Venue(s): 1 (in 1 host city)

The 2019 FIBA U16 Asian Championship was originally to be the FIBA Asia's qualifying tournament for the 2020 FIBA Under-17 Basketball World Cup. The tournament would have been held in Beirut, Lebanon, from 5 to 12 April 2020. The top four teams would have represented FIBA Asia at the 2020 FIBA Under-17 Basketball World Cup in Bulgaria. However, both Asian Championship and World Cup were cancelled by FIBA due to the COVID-19 pandemic.

== Qualification ==
=== Allocation of berths ===
According to FIBA Asia rules, the number of participating teams in the FIBA U16 Asian Championship was set at 16. The hosts and the defending champions qualified automatically. All FIBA Asia subzones got two berths each, except for the Central and South Asian subzones, which got one berth each. FIBA Oceania also got one berth. The last three berths were allocated to Asian subzones based on their teams' results in the 2017 FIBA U16 Asian Championship.

Allocation of berths
Subzone	Automatic qualifiers		Default berths	Additional berths as top 3 Asian teams from last championship	Total
Subzone	Hosts	Defending champions	Default berths	Additional berths as top 3 Asian teams from last championship	Total
Central Asia	0	0	1	0	1
East Asia	0	0	2	2	4
Gulf	0	0	2	0	2
South Asia	0	0	1	0	1
Southeast Asia	0	0	2	1	3
West Asia	1	0	2	0	3
FIBA Oceania	0	1	1	—	2
Total	1	1	11	3	16

=== Qualified teams ===
Here are the list of the qualified teams:

Included are the teams' FIBA World Rankings prior to the tournament (as of 7 December 2018).

Means of qualification	Date	Venue	Vacancies	Qualifiers
Host nation	4 February 2020	N/A	1	Lebanon (47)
Defending champions	2–8 April 2018	(China) Foshan	1	Australia (10)
Central Asia qualifiers	20–22 May 2019	(Kazakhstan) Taraz	1	Kazakhstan (64)
East Asia qualifiers	N/A	N/A	4	China (14); South Korea (18); Japan (25); Chinese Taipei (34)
GBA qualifiers	27–31 August 2018	(United Arab Emirates) Dubai	2	Saudi Arabia (82); Kuwait (69)
South Asia qualifiers	3–5 July 2019	(Bangladesh) Dhaka	1	India (52)
Southeast Asia qualifiers	N/A	N/A	3	Philippines (30); Thailand (69); Indonesia (72)
West Asia qualifiers	28 July – 1 August 2018	(Iran) Gorgan	2	Iran (26); Syria (72)
2018 FIBA Under-15 Oceania Championship	4–8 December 2018	(Papua New Guinea) Port Moresby	1	New Zealand (28)
