= 2025 FIBA U16 Asia Cup =

Men's under-16 basketball tournament in Mongolia

8th FIBA Under-16 Asian Basketball Championship

Tournament details
- Host country: Mongolia
- City: Ulaanbaatar
- Dates: 31 August – 7 September
- Teams: 16 (from 1 confederation)
- Venues: 2 (in 1 host city)

Final positions
- Champions: Australia (4th title)
- Runners-up: China
- Third place: New Zealand

Tournament statistics
- MVP: (Australia) Luke Paul

Official website
- www.fiba.basketball

The 2025 FIBA U16 Asia Cup was the eighth edition of the FIBA Under-16 Asia Cup, the continental basketball championship for under-16 men's national teams from the FIBA Asia zone. The tournament was played at the M bank arena and the Buyant Ukhaa Sport Palace in Ulaanbaatar, Mongolia, from 31 August to 7 September 2025. It also served as a qualifier for the 2026 FIBA Under-17 Basketball World Cup in Turkey, where the top four teams qualified.

Australia successfully defended their title from the previous championship after defeating China in the final, 85–58.

On 5 September 2025, after winning their respective quarterfinal matches, Australia, New Zealand, China, and Japan clinched the four spots allocated and will represent FIBA Asia at the 2026 FIBA Under-17 Basketball World Cup.

== Qualification ==
=== Allocation of berths ===
According to FIBA Asia rules, the number of participating teams in the FIBA U16 Asia Cup was set at 16. The hosts and the defending champions qualified automatically. All FIBA Asia subzones got two berths each, except for the Central and South Asian subzones, which got one berth each. FIBA Oceania also got two berths. The host contributes to one berth for his subzone, whereas the defending champion does not. The last three berths were allocated to Asian subzones based on their teams' results in the 2023 FIBA U16 Asian Championship.

Allocation of berths
Subzone	Automatic qualifiers		Default berths	Additional berths as top 3 Asian teams from last championship	Total
Subzone	Hosts	Defending champions	Default berths	Additional berths as top 3 Asian teams from last championship	Total
Central Asia	0	0	1	0	1
East Asia	1	0	2	2	5
Gulf	0	0	2	0	2
South Asia	0	0	1	0	1
Southeast Asia	0	0	2	1	3
West Asia	0	0	2	0	2
FIBA Oceania	0	1 (Note: The defending champion does not contribute to additional berths.)	2	—N/a	2
Total	1	1	12	3	16

=== Qualified teams ===
The following is the list of the qualified teams. FIBA Boys' World Rankings as of 2 December 2024 are in parentheses.

- Central Asia (1)
  - Kazakhstan (78)
- East Asia (5)
  - Mongolia (88; hosts)
  - China (19)
  - Japan (26)
  - South Korea (31)
  - Chinese Taipei (51)
- Gulf (2)
  - Saudi Arabia (79)
  - Bahrain (94)
- South Asia (1)
  - India (39)
- Southeast Asia (3)
  - Philippines (35)
  - Malaysia (74)
  - Indonesia (89)
- West Asia (2)
  - Iran (23)
  - Lebanon (36)
- Oceania (2)
  - Australia (7; 3-times defending champions)
  - New Zealand (15)

== Preliminary round ==
The draw of the preliminary round was held on 30 July 2025 at the FIBA Asia Regional Office in Beirut, Lebanon.

In the preliminary round, the teams were drawn into four groups of four. The winners of each group advanced directly to the quarterfinals; the second and third teams played the playoff match, the winner of which also advanced to the quarterfinals.

All times are local (Mongolian Standard Time; UTC+08:00).

=== Group A ===
Pos	Team	Pld	W	L	PF	PA	PD	Pts	Qualification
1	Australia	3	3	0	345	150	+195	6	Quarterfinals
2	Bahrain	3	2	1	228	289	−61	5	Playoffs
3	Lebanon	3	1	2	224	216	+8	4	Playoffs
4	India	3	0	3	195	337	−142	3	

Source: FIBA
Rules for classification: 1) Points; 2) Head-to-head results; 3) Points difference; 4) Points scored.

31 August 2025
11:30

Box Score

Australia	141–47	Bahrain
Scoring by quarter: 41−11, 33−14, 35−13, 32−9
Pts: Paul 20; Rebs: Byrne 10; Asts: Paul 12		Pts: Meshaei 13; Rebs: Onoduenyi 7 Asts: AlHaddad 4

Buyant Ukhaa Sport Palace, Ulaanbaatar
Referees: Song Houlu (CHN), Tomohiro Hosoda (JPN), An Young Sun (KOR)

31 August 2025
14:00

Box Score

Lebanon	95–73	India
Scoring by quarter: 24−20, 16−14, 21−19, 34−20
Pts: Sawma 34; Rebs: Nahle 13; Asts: El Herera 7		Pts: Rathee 19; Rebs: Tomer 12; Asts: Suneriya, Khan 4

Buyant Ukhaa Sport Palace, Ulaanbaatar
Referees: Lee Kyounghwan (KOR), Nattapong Jontapa (THA), Yusuke Ichikawa (JPN)

1 September 2025
11:30

Box Score

India	42–131	Australia
Scoring by quarter: 11−34, 11−30, 10−32, 10−35
Pts: Tomer 11; Rebs: Tomer 8 Asts: Rathee 4		Pts: Jorgenson 22; Rebs: Machar 9 Asts: Paul 8

M bank arena, Ulaanbaatar
Referees: Tomohiro Hosoda (JPN), An Young San (KOR), Ganbayar Gantumur (MGL)

1 September 2025
14:00

Box Score

Bahrain	70–68	Lebanon
Scoring by quarter: 22−18, 9−15, 15−21, 24−14
Pts: Onoduenyi 23; Rebs: Onoduenyi 23; Asts: Mohamed 4		Pts: El Herera 17; Rebs: Abboud 18; Asts: El Herera 4

M bank arena, Ulaanbaatar
Referees: Chan Owe Shiong (MAS), Preeda Muongmee (THA), Leong Chuen Wing (SGP)

2 September 2025
11:30

Box Score

Australia	73–61	Lebanon
Scoring by quarter: 24−16, 17−18, 14−11, 18−16
Pts: Jorgenson 20; Rebs: Paul 7 Asts: Watene 4		Pts: Sawma 22; Rebs: Abboud 9 Asts: 4 players 2

Buyant Ukhaa Sport Palace, Ulaanbaatar
Referees: Yaroshenko Vladislav (KAZ), Ichikawa Yusuke (JPN)

2 September 2025
14:00

Box Score

India	80–111	Bahrain
Scoring by quarter: 27-30, 12-23, 21-25, 20-33
Pts: Arman 23; Rebs: Tomer 13; Asts: Rathee 8		Pts: Abdulkadir 31; Rebs: Abdulkadir 21; Asts: Ghuloom 7

Buyant Ukhaa Sport Palace, Ulaanbaatar
Referees: Lee Kyounghwan (KOR), Hosoda Tomohiro (JPN), Song Houlu (CHN)

=== Group B ===
Pos	Team	Pld	W	L	PF	PA	PD	Pts	Qualification
1	New Zealand	3	3	0	282	190	+92	6	Quarterfinals
2	Chinese Taipei	3	2	1	295	285	+10	5	Playoffs
3	Philippines	3	1	2	201	251	−50	4	Playoffs
4	Indonesia	3	0	3	216	268	−52	3	

Source: FIBA
Rules for classification: 1) Points; 2) Head-to-head results; 3) Points difference; 4) Points scored.

31 August 2025
16:30

Box Score

New Zealand	96–54	Indonesia
Scoring by quarter: 23−11, 31−20, 23−9, 19−14
Pts: Duncan 15; Rebs: Duncan 14; Asts: Hakaraia, Cate 6		Pts: Naranatha 18; Rebs: Sebastian 6 Asts: Christiano 6

Buyant Ukhaa Sport Palace, Ulaanbaatar
Referees: Aryan Jamshidi (IRI), Jeremy Goh (SGP), Ganbayar Gantumur (MGL)

31 August 2025
19:00

Box Score

Philippines	82–106	Chinese Taipei
Scoring by quarter: 21−28, 21−29, 20−30, 20−19
Pts: Cariño 23; Rebs: Orca 13; Asts: Cabanero 6		Pts: Wang I.L. 24; Rebs: Pan C.W. 6 Asts: Chou Y.C. 5

Buyant Ukhaa Sport Palace, Ulaanbaatar
Referees: Chan Owe Shiong (MAS), Abdullah Alhejaili (KSA), Vladislav Yaroshenko (KAZ)

1 September 2025
16:30

Box Score

Chinese Taipei	82–101	New Zealand
Scoring by quarter: 20−22, 21−37, 23−21, 18−21
Pts: Wang I.L., Sing P.A. 16; Rebs: Chang C.Y., Chou Y.C. 5 Asts: Chou 4		Pts: Sula 22; Rebs: Sula 7 Asts: Sula 5

M bank arena, Ulaanbaatar
Referees: Lee Kyoung-hwan (KOR), Aryan Jamshidi (IRI), Vladislav Yaroshenko (KAZ)

1 September 2025
19:00

Box Score

Indonesia	60–65	Philippines
Scoring by quarter: 20−17, 10−19, 18−15, 12−14
Pts: Christiano 13; Rebs: Sebastian 11; Asts: 6 players 1		Pts: Tan-chi 12; Rebs: Orca 13; Asts: J. Pascual 5

M bank arena, Ulaanbaatar
Referees: Song Houlu CHN), Yusuke Ichikawa (JPN)

2 September 2025
16:30

Box Score

New Zealand	85–54	Philippines
Scoring by quarter: 17−7, 25−19, 24−18, 19−10
Pts: Keogh 17; Rebs: Wilson 14; Asts: Keogh 7		Pts: Hallare 13; Rebs: Cariño 8 Asts: Tan-chi 4

Buyant Ukhaa Sport Palace, Ulaanbaatar
Referees: Aryan Jamshidi (IRI), An Young Sun (KOR), Ganbayar Gantumar (MGL)

2 September 2025
19:00

Box Score

Chinese Taipei	107–102	Indonesia
Scoring by quarter: 26−23, 34−32, 16−21, 31−26
Pts: Wang I.L. 21; Rebs: 3 players 7 Asts: Chou Y.C., Hsiao C.C. 4		Pts: Hernusi 22; Rebs: Sebastian 12; Asts: 3 players 4

Buyant Ukhaa Sport Palace, Ulaanbaatar
Referees: Chan Owe Shiong (MAS), Jeremy Goh (SGP)

=== Group C ===
Pos	Team	Pld	W	L	PF	PA	PD	Pts	Qualification
1	China	3	3	0	300	170	+130	6	Quarterfinals
2	South Korea	3	2	1	289	226	+63	5	Playoffs
3	Malaysia	3	1	2	193	280	−87	4	Playoffs
4	Mongolia (H)	3	0	3	161	267	−106	3	

Source: FIBA
Rules for classification: 1) Points; 2) Head-to-head results; 3) Points difference; 4) Points scored.
(H) Hosts

31 August 2025
16:30

Box Score

South Korea	123–70	Malaysia
Scoring by quarter: 41−16, 29−17, 32−21, 21−16
Pts: Lee S.H. 19; Rebs: 4 players 6 Asts: Park T. 10		Pts: Tai 22; Rebs: Chen 6 Asts: Lim, San 3

M bank arena, Ulaanbaatar
Referees: Travis Stewart (AUS), Lin Yuan Dian (TPE), Sadiq Almeshkhas (BRN)

31 August 2025
19:00

Box Score

China	103–45	Mongolia
Scoring by quarter: 27−13, 32−8, 25−20, 19−4
Pts: Zhang Y. 27; Rebs: Zhang C., Zhao 8 Asts: Yao, Zhou 6		Pts: Batnyam 15; Rebs: Damdin 8 Asts: Gantur, Orgil 2

M bank arena, Ulaanbaatar
Referees: Rakesh Ramalingaiah (IND), Rendra Lesmana (INA), Ralph Lauren Moreto (PHI)

1 September 2025
16:30

Box Score

Malaysia	44–100	China
Scoring by quarter: 10−25, 12−25, 8−24, 14−26
Pts: Sham, Tai 8 Rebs: Lim, Chen 6 Asts: 3 players 2		Pts: Lyu 18; Rebs: Zhang Z. 11; Asts: Chen 9

Buyant Ukhaa Sport Palace, Ulaanbaatar
Referees: Rendra Lesmana (INA), Sadiq Almeshkhas (BRN)

1 September 2025
19:00

Box Score

Mongolia	59–85	South Korea
Scoring by quarter: 13−22, 18−21, 16−24, 12−18
Pts: Damdin 16; Rebs: Damdin 14; Asts: Orgil 3		Pts: Park B. 25; Rebs: Park B. 9 Asts: 3 players 4

Buyant Ukhaa Sport Palace, Ulaanbaatar
Referees: Nattapong Jontapa (THA), Michael Graham (NZL), Ralph Lauren Moreto (PHI)

2 September 2025
16:30

Box Score

China	97–81	South Korea
Scoring by quarter: 22−25, 22−20, 27−12, 26−24
Pts: Zhang C. 25; Rebs: Zhang Z. 20; Asts: Zhang Y. 11		Pts: Park T. 27; Rebs: Lee S.H. 7 Asts: Park T. 9

M bank arena, Ulaanbaatar
Referees: Leong Chuen Wing (SGP), Michael Graham (NZL), Ralph Lauren Moreto (PHI)

2 September 2025
19:00

Box Score

Malaysia	79–57	Mongolia
Scoring by quarter: 16−12, 22−16, 27−9, 14−20
Pts: Tan 23; Rebs: Kingsley Daniel 10; Asts: San 5		Pts: Damdin 18; Rebs: Damdin 8 Asts: Gantur, Khangarid 3

M bank arena, Ulaanbaatar
Referees: Rakesh Ramalingaiah (IND), Aaron Rey Cañete (PHI), Sadiq Almeshkhas (BHR)

=== Group D ===
Pos	Team	Pld	W	L	PF	PA	PD	Pts	Qualification
1	Japan	3	3	0	271	176	+95	6	Quarterfinals
2	Iran	3	2	1	244	170	+74	5	Playoffs
3	Kazakhstan	3	1	2	145	246	−101	4	Playoffs
4	Saudi Arabia	3	0	3	150	218	−68	3	

Source: FIBA
Rules for classification: 1) Points; 2) Head-to-head results; 3) Points difference; 4) Points scored.

31 August 2025
11:30

Box Score

Iran	87–43	Saudi Arabia
Scoring by quarter: 22−15, 25−10, 21−8, 19−10
Pts: Rashidi 23; Rebs: Taghizadeh 12; Asts: Raeisi 6		Pts: Peake 7 Rebs: Al Qattan 6 Asts: Aldubaisi 4

M bank arena, Ulaanbaatar
Referees: Preeda Muongmee (THA), Rakesh Ramaligaiah (IND), Aaron Rey Cañete (PHI)

31 August 2025
14:00

Box Score

Japan	107–51	Kazakhstan
Scoring by quarter: 31−11, 35−16, 23−9, 18−15
Pts: Hawkins 23; Rebs: Shiratani 9 Asts: Miyazato, Takahashi 7		Pts: Atakhanov 11; Rebs: Denissov 6 Asts: Moskalevich 3

M bank arena, Ulaanbaatar
Referees: Leong Chuen Wing (SGP), Michael Graham (NZL), Chan Ho Ming (HKG)

1 September 2025
11:30

Box Score

Saudi Arabia	58–78	Japan
Scoring by quarter: 17−18, 8−29, 16−17, 17−14
Pts: Alzayer, Al Qattan 11; Rebs: Alshinkite, Alzayer 6 Asts: Aldubaisi 3		Pts: Koshi 18; Rebs: Shiratani 7 Asts: Blake 4

Buyant Ukhaa Sport Palace, Ulaanbaatar
Referees: Nattapong Jontapa (THA), Lin Yuan Dian (TPE), Chan Ho Ming (HKG)

1 September 2025
14:00

Box Score

Kazakhstan	41–90	Iran
Scoring by quarter: 16−27, 8−26, 9−21, 8−16
Pts: Shmik 9 Rebs: Tlembay 11; Asts: 4 players 2		Pts: Azari 18; Rebs: Pakgohar 9 Asts: Behnia 6

Buyant Ukhaa Sport Palace, Ulaanbaatar
Referees: Rakesh Ramaligaiah (IND), Aaron Rey Cañete (PHI), Travis Stewart (AUS)

2 September 2025
11:30

Box Score

Iran	67–86	Japan
Scoring by quarter: 18-22, 18-18, 16-20, 15-26
Pts: Rashidi 22; Rebs: Taghizadeh, MorovatHalabi 7 Asts: Rashidi, Behnia 4		Pts: Shiratani 24; Rebs: Shiratani 16; Asts: Miyazato 7

M bank arena, Ulaanbaatar
Referees: Muongee Preeda (THA), Lin Yuan Dian (TPE), Stewart Travis (AUS)

2 September 2025
14:00

Box Score

Kazakhstan	53–49	Saudi Arabia
Scoring by quarter: 17-10, 9-10, 12-22, 15-7
Pts: Tlembay 23; Rebs: Tlembay, Bissengaliyev 13; Asts: Atakhanov 3		Pts: Baltaji 11; Rebs: Alshinkite 17; Asts: Aldubaisi 4

M bank arena, Ulaanbaatar
Referees: Jontapa Nattapong (THA), Lesmana Rendra (INA), Chan Ho Ming (HKG)

== Final round ==
=== Bracket ===
Playoffs
4 September
South Korea	96
Kazakhstan	48
4 September
Chinese Taipei	97
Lebanon	90
4 September
Iran	102
Malaysia	62
4 September
Bahrain	79
Philippines	66

Quarter-finals
5 September
Australia	98
South Korea	70
5 September
Japan	83
Chinese Taipei	72
5 September
New Zealand	92
Iran	69
5 September
China	84
Bahrain	69

Semi-finals
6 September
Australia	101
Japan	36
6 September
New Zealand	72
China	86

Final
7 September
Australia	85
China	58
Third place game
7 September
Japan	92
New Zealand	93

Classification 5th–8th

Classification semifinals
6 September
South Korea	79
Chinese Taipei	74
6 September
Iran	95
Bahrain	62

Fifth place game
7 September
South Korea	78
Iran	73
Seventh place game
7 September
Chinese Taipei	105
Bahrain	103

=== Qualification to Quarterfinals ===
4 September 2025
11:30

Box Score

Bahrain	79–66	Philippines
Scoring by quarter: 22−21, 20−16, 20−13, 17−16
Pts: Abdulla 22; Rebs: Habib, Abdulkadir 12; Asts: Habib, Mohamed 5		Pts: J. Pascual 10; Rebs: Cabanero 8 Asts: G. Pascual 8

M bank arena, Ulaanbaatar
Referees: Jontapa Nattapong (THA), Yaroshenko Vladislav (KAZ), Gantumur Ganbayar (MGL)

4 September 2025
14:00

Box Score

Chinese Taipei	97–90	Lebanon
Scoring by quarter: 29−21, 24−26, 25−23, 19−20
Pts: Wang I.L. 19; Rebs: Wang J.C., Chang Y.C. 7 Asts: Chou Y.C. 7		Pts: Sawma 38; Rebs: Abboud 11; Asts: 4 players 2

M bank arena, Ulaanbaatar
Referees: Muongmee Preeda (THA), Leong Chuen Wing (SGP), Ramalingaiah Rakesh (IND)

4 September 2025
16:30

Box Score

South Korea	96–48	Kazakhstan
Scoring by quarter: 33−15, 24−15, 21−13, 18−5
Pts: Chu 20; Rebs: Min 10; Asts: Park 7		Pts: Tlembay 19; Rebs: Tlembay 14; Asts: Tlembay 3

M bank arena, Ulaanbaatar
Referees: Chan Owe Shiong (MAS), Canete Aron Ray (PHI), Chan Ho Ming (HKG)

4 September 2025
19:00

Box Score

Iran	102–62	Malaysia
Scoring by quarter: 24−12, 25−18, 32−22, 21−10
Pts: Rashidi 21; Rebs: Taghizadeh 12; Asts: Behnia 9		Pts: Lee 16; Rebs: Tai 6 Asts: San, Tan 2

M bank arena, Ulaanbaatar
Referees: Alhejaili Abdullah (KSA), Lesmana Rendra (INA), Goh Jeremy (SGP)

=== Quarterfinals ===
5 September 2025
11:30

Box Score

Australia	98–70	South Korea
Scoring by quarter: 25−21, 23−16, 25−17, 25−16
Pts: Paul 21; Rebs: Mabbott 12; Asts: Browne 8		Pts: Lee S.H. 25; Rebs: Lee S.H. 8 Asts: Park 11

M bank arena, Ulaanbaatar
Referees: Rakesh Ramalingaiah (IND), Nattapong Jontapa (THA), Ganbayar Gantumur (MGL)

5 September 2025
14:00

Box Score

New Zealand	92–69	Iran
Scoring by quarter: 24−10, 22−23, 25−18, 21−18
Pts: Duncan 15; Rebs: Duncan 10; Asts: Cate 7		Pts: Rashidi 23; Rebs: Khosravi 9 Asts: Behnia 5

M bank arena, Ulaanbaatar
Referees: Leong Chuen Wing (SGP), Vladislav Yaroshenko (KAZ), Jeremy Goh (SGP)

5 September 2025
16:30

Box Score

China	84–69	Bahrain
Scoring by quarter: 21−16, 21−15, 26−19, 16−19
Pts: Zhang C. 19; Rebs: Zhang C. 11; Asts: Chen 9		Pts: Abdulkadir 29; Rebs: Abdulkadir 21; Asts: Mohamed 6

M bank arena, Ulaanbaatar
Referees: Chan Owe Shiong (MAS), Rendra Lesmana (INA), Ralph Lauren Moreto (PHI)

5 September 2025
19:00

Box Score

Japan	83–72	Chinese Taipei
Scoring by quarter: 23−24, 22−14, 22−12, 16−22
Pts: Koshi 31; Rebs: Shiratani 14; Asts: Miyazato 6		Pts: Chang 27; Rebs: Chang 8 Asts: Wang I., Chen H. 2

M bank arena, Ulaanbaatar
Referees: Preeda Muongmee (THA), Abdullah Alhejaili (KSA), Aaron Rey Cañete (PHI)

=== 5th–8th place semifinals ===
6 September 2025
11:30

Box Score

Iran	95–62	Bahrain
Scoring by quarter: 20–18, 23−14, 22−19, 30−11
Pts: Morovat 23; Rebs: Morovat 9 Asts: Rashidi 6		Pts: Abdulkadir 20; Rebs: Abdulkadir 13; Asts: Fuad 3

M Bank arena, Ulaanbaatar
Referees: Leong Chuen Wing Leong (SGP), Song Houlu (CHN), Travis Stewart (AUS)

6 September 2025
14:00

Box Score

South Korea	79–74	Chinese Taipei
Scoring by quarter: 29–16, 22−11, 8−26, 20−21
Pts: Park B. 21; Rebs: Lee S.H. 13; Asts: Park T., Kim J.Y.		Pts: Wang I. 20; Rebs: Lu 11; Asts: 3 players 3

M Bank Arena, Ulaanbaatar
Referees: Nattapong Jontapa (THA), Michael Graham (NZL), Yusuke Ichikawa (JPN)

==== Seventh place game ====
7 September 2025
11:30

Box Score

Chinese Taipei	105–103	Bahrain
Scoring by quarter: 27–23, 29−24, 25−34, 24−22
Pts: Wang I. 18; Rebs: 3 players 6 Asts: Chou 6		Pts: Onoduenyi, Abdulkadir 25; Rebs: Abdulkadir 18; Asts: Meshaei, Abdulkadir 5

M Bank arena, Ulaanbaatar
Referees: Lee Kyounghwan (KOR), Nattapong Jontapa (THA), Michael Graham (NZL)

==== Fifth place game ====
7 September 2025
14:00

Box Score

South Korea	78–73	Iran
Scoring by quarter: 19–14, 23−25, 14−21, 22−13
Pts: Park T. 24; Rebs: Park B. 6 Asts: Park T. 8		Pts: Morovat 19; Rebs: Pakgohar 13; Asts: Khosravi 6

M Bank arena, Ulaanbaatar
Referees: Leong Chuen Wing (SGP), Tomohiro Hosoda (JPN), Sadiq Almeshkhas (BRN)

=== Championship semifinals ===
6 September 2025
16:30

Box Score

New Zealand	72–86	China
Scoring by quarter: 16–14, 22−18, 13−23, 21−31
Pts: Sula 14; Rebs: Cate 6 Asts: Cate 11		Pts: Zhang Y. 24; Rebs: Zhao 11; Asts: Chen 8

M bank arena, Ulaanbaatar
Referees: Preeda Muongmee (THA), Lee Kyounghwan (KOR), Vladislav Yaroshenko (KAZ)

6 September 2025
19:00

Box Score

Australia	101–36	Japan
Scoring by quarter: 31–10, 23−9, 20−8, 27−9
Pts: Hamilton 17; Rebs: Byrne 10; Asts: Paul, Hamilton 4		Pts: 3 players 7 Rebs: 3 players 3 Asts: 3 players 2

M bank arena, Ulaanbaatar
Referees: Aryan Jamshidi (IRI), Rakesh Ramalingaiah (IND), Abdullah Alhejaili (KSA)

==== Third place game ====
7 September 2025
16:30

Box Score

Japan	92–93	New Zealand
Scoring by quarter: 9–24, 29−28, 25−22, 29−19
Pts: Koshi 24; Rebs: Hawkins, Miyazato 3 Asts: Miyazato 8		Pts: Cate 17; Rebs: Tuimaunei 6 Asts: Cate 7

M bank arena, Ulaanbaatar
Referees: Preeda Muongmee (THA), Rakesh Ramalingaiah(IND), Aaron Rey Cañete (PHI)

==== Final ====
7 September 2025
19:00

Box Score

Australia	85–58	China
Scoring by quarter: 17–16, 17−17, 21−10, 30−15

M bank arena, Ulaanbaatar

== Final standings ==
Rank	Team	Record
1st place, gold medalist(s)	Australia	6–0
2nd place, silver medalist(s)	China	5–1
3rd place, bronze medalist(s)	New Zealand	5–1
4	Japan	4–2
5	South Korea	5–2
6	Iran	4–3
7	Chinese Taipei	4–3
8	Bahrain	3–4
9	Lebanon	1–3
10	Philippines	1–3
11	Malaysia	1–3
12	Kazakhstan	1–3
13	Indonesia	0–3
14	Saudi Arabia	0–3
15	Mongolia	0–3
16	India	0–3

Qualified for the 2026 FIBA Under-17 Basketball World Cup

== Awards ==
2025 Asian Under-16 champions

Australia
Fourth title

=== All-Tournament Team ===
- G (Australia) Luke Paul (MVP)
- G (New Zealand) Tawhiri Cate
- F (Australia) Will Hamilton
- F (China) Zhang Yizhaojie
- C (China) Zhang Ziyi
