= Dungarpur Mews =

Museum in Dungarpur, Rajasthan, India

Coordinates: 23.8369°N 73.7233°E

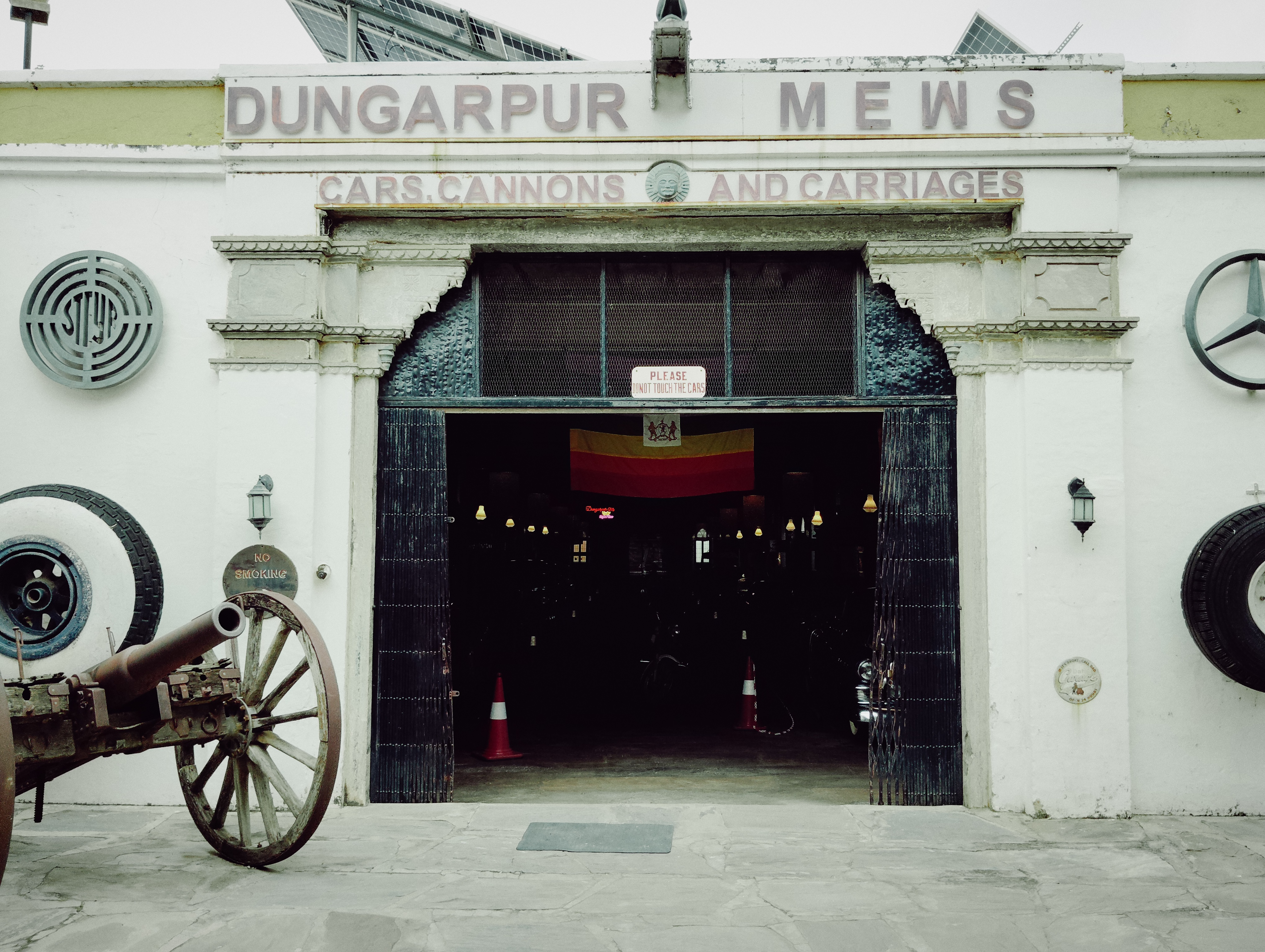
- Interactive map of the Dungarpur Mews area

General information
- Type: Museum
- Location: Udai Bilas Palace, Dungarpur, Rajasthan, India
- Owner: Harshvardhan Singh

The Dungarpur Mews is an automobile museum in Dungarpur, Rajasthan, India.

== Background ==
Located within the Udai Bilas Palace complex, the building was originally used as a stable and for grain storage. It was later converted into an automobile museum by Harshvardhan Singh. At the end of the museum, there is a car bar.

== Collection ==
The museum has more than 40 vehicles. Its collection includes:

- A 1947 Packard Clipper Deluxe
- A 1939 Fiat 7-seater saloon
- A 1942 Willys MB Jeep
- A 1952 Willys CJ-3A
- A 1950 Cadillac Series 62 convertible
- A Standard Vanguard
- A 1949 Standard Flying Fourteen
- A 1966 Volkswagen Beetle
- A 1975 Land Rover
- A 1937 Steyr 220 cabriolet
- A 1983 Mazda 929 Coupe
- A 1984 Jaguar XJS Coupe
- A 1984 Mercedes 380 SL
- A 1984 Mazda RX-7
- A 1988 Honda Accord
- A 1990 BMW 730iL
- A 1995 BMW 740i

The museum also houses a collection of motorcycles, including:

- A 1959 BMW R26
- A 1976 BMW R45
- A 1962 Royal Enfield Bullet
- A 1984 Royal Enfield Bullet
- A Rajdoot Bobby

Besides these, it houses a 1910 Marshall steam engine road roller and a scaled-down model of the DH-5 aircraft. It also features posters, paintings, art installations, radiator grilles, mascots, and lamps. The museum also displays old horse carriages, a few British-made cannons, and two 19th-century double-carriage cannons.

== Gallery ==
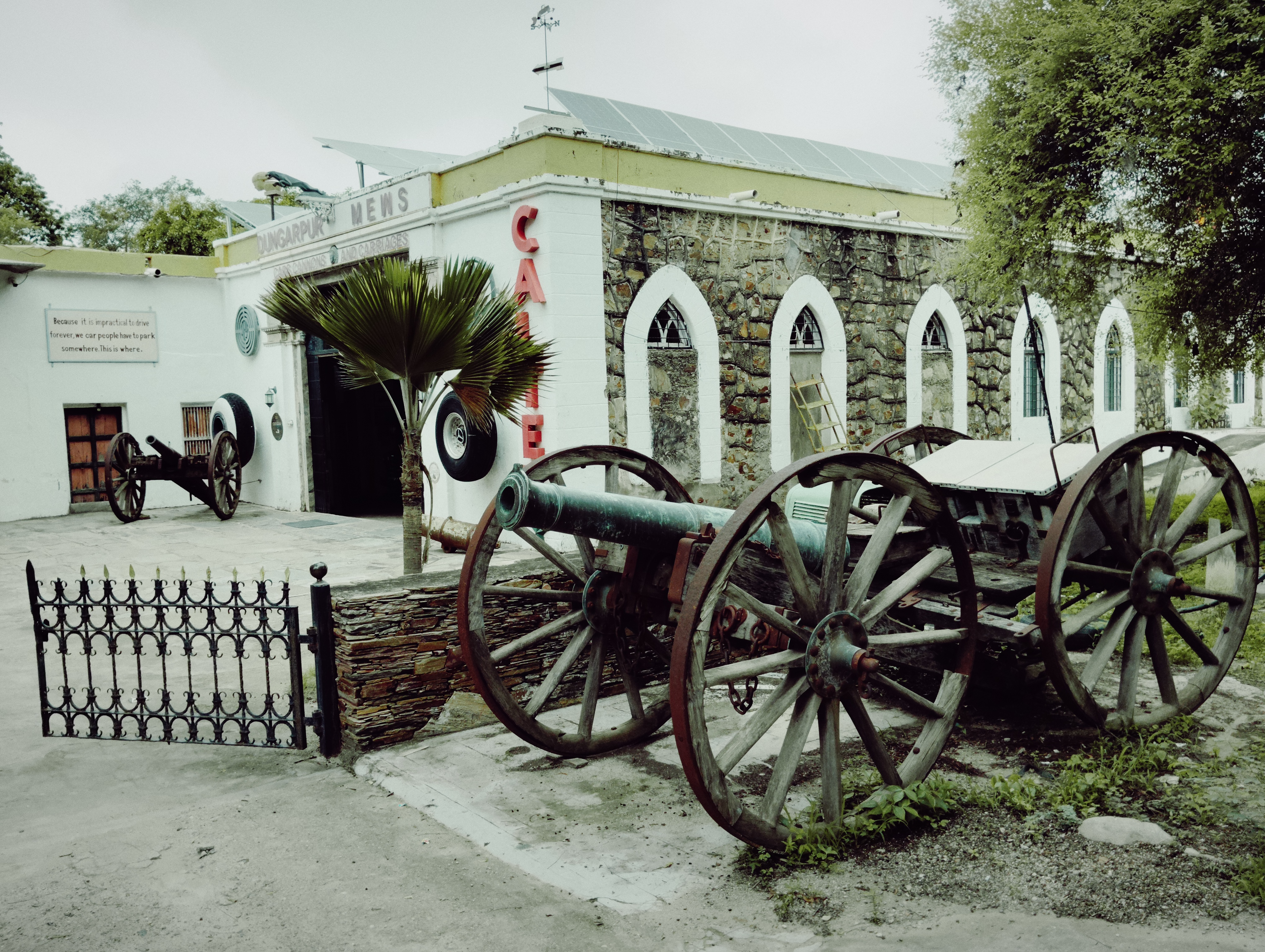
Dungarpur Mews in Udai Bilas Palace

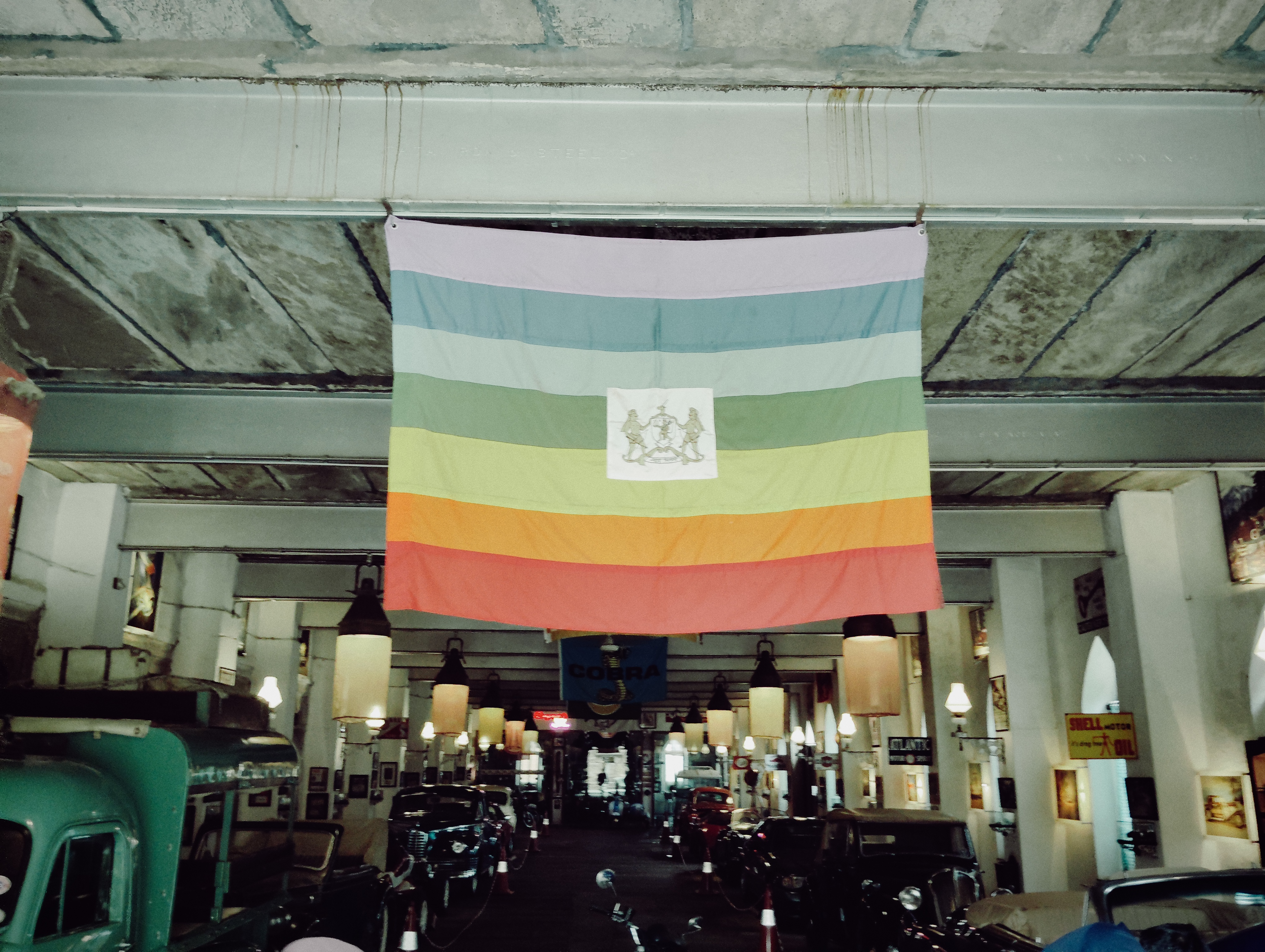
Dungarpur Mews in Udai Bilas Palace

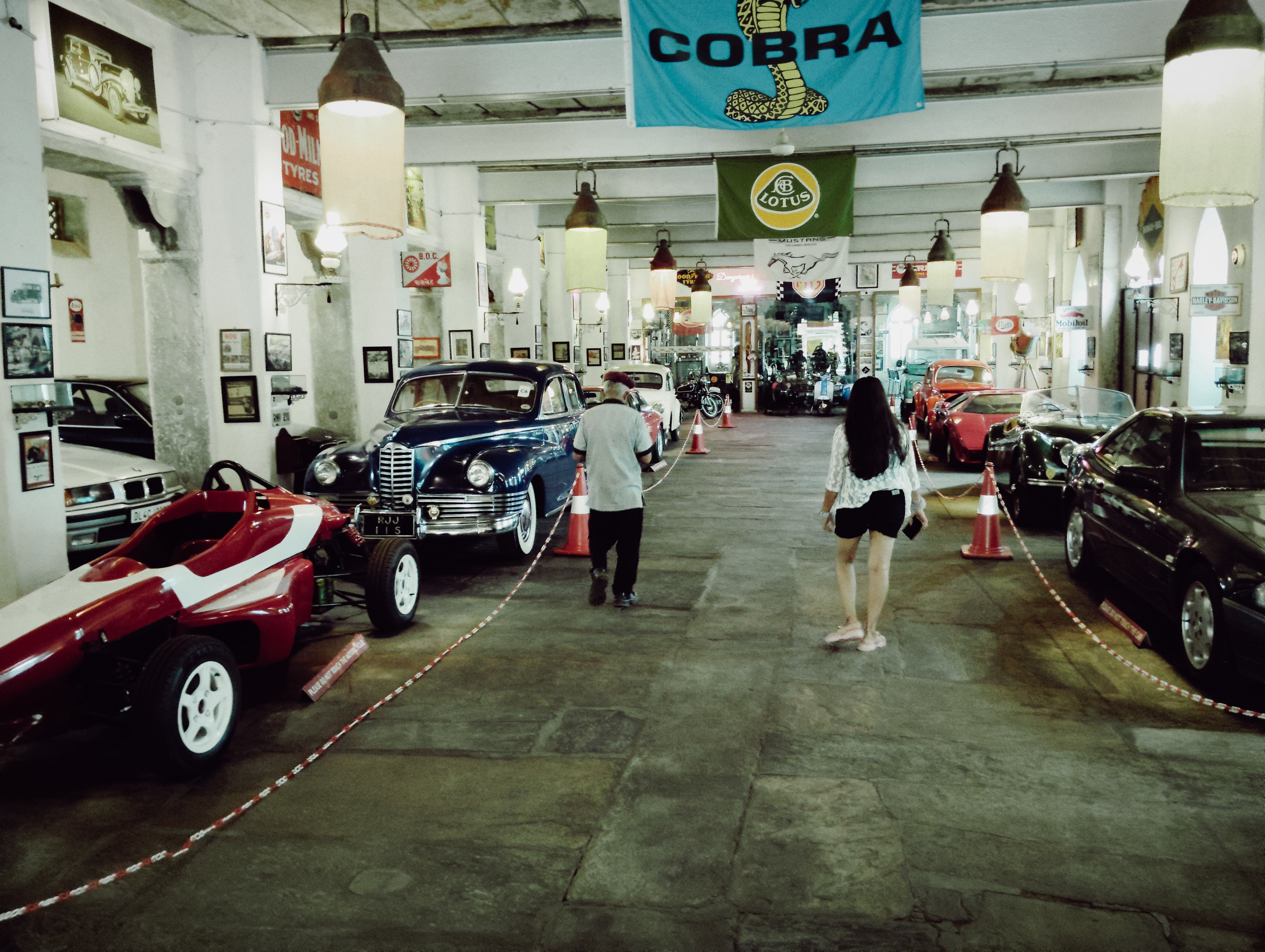
Dungarpur Mews in Udai Bilas Palace

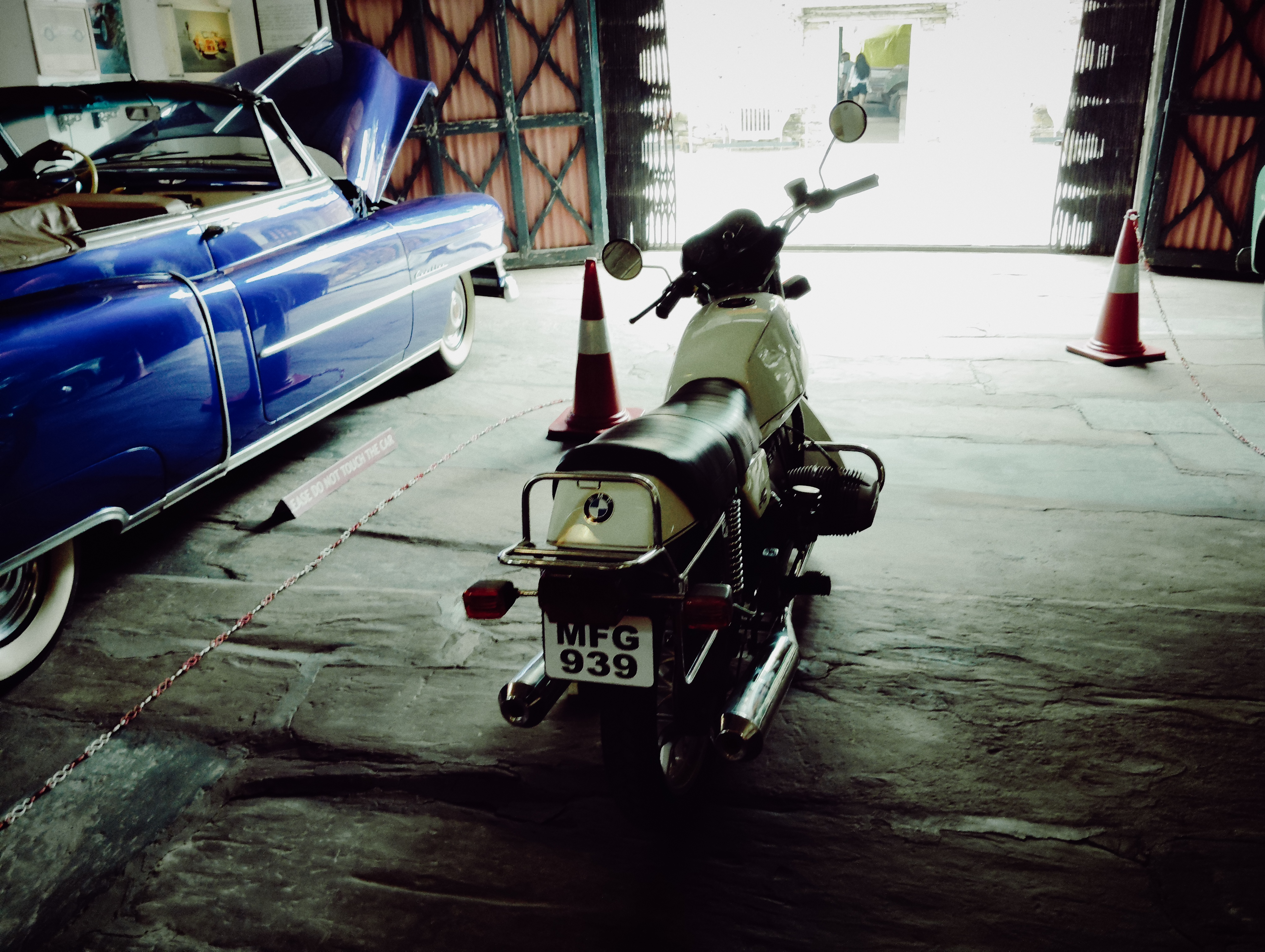
BMW R65

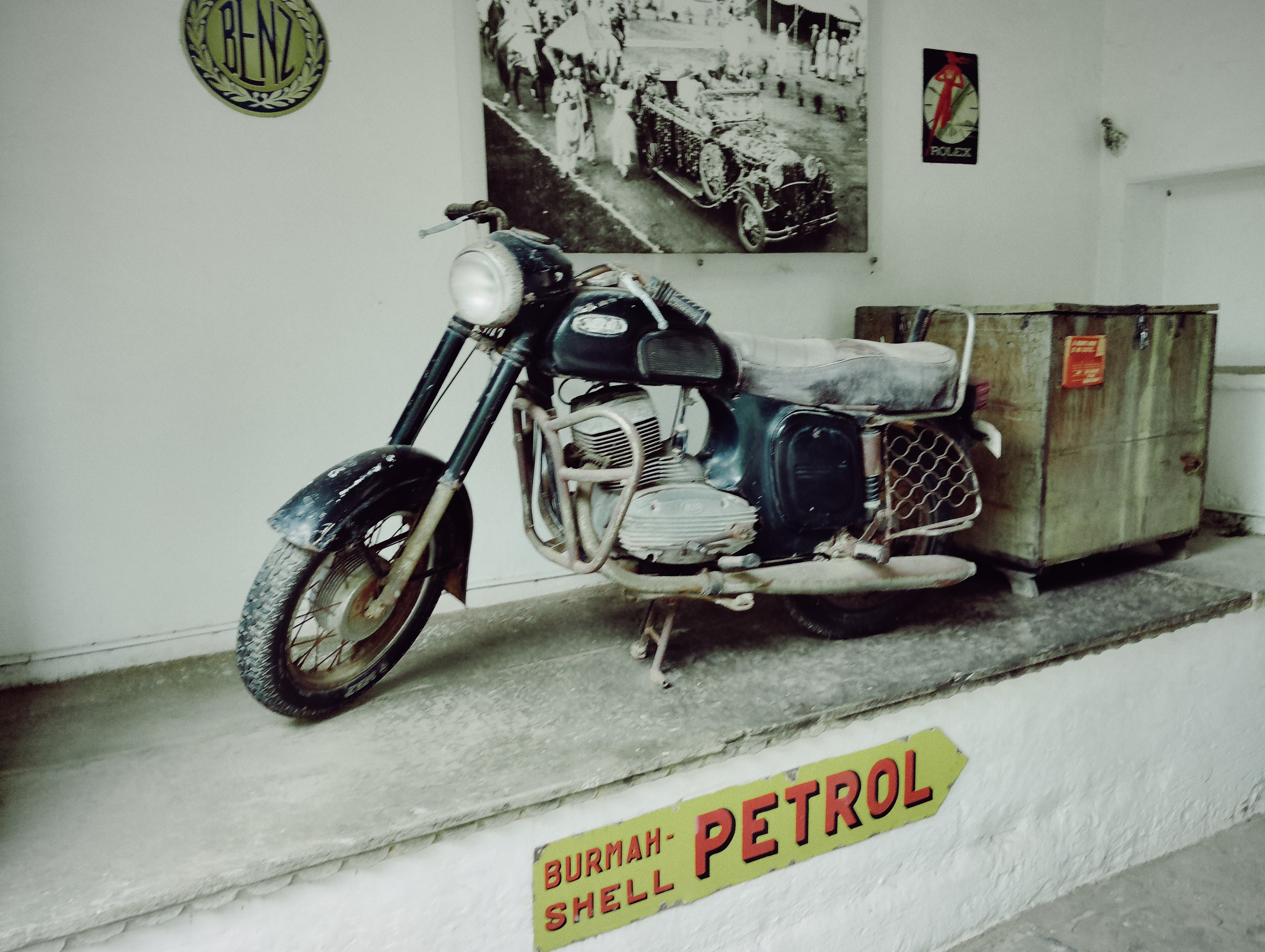
Yezdi at Dungarpur Mews

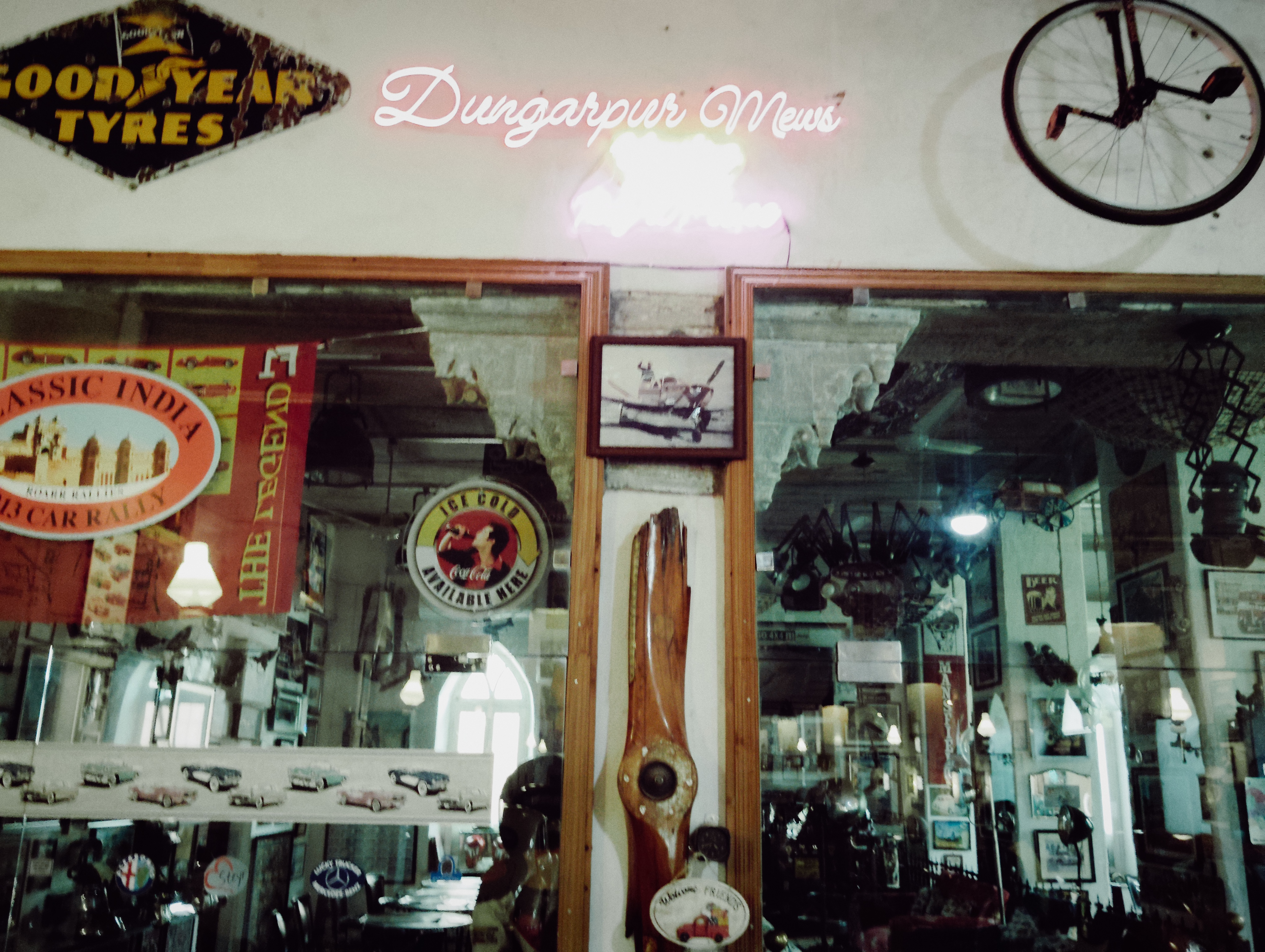
Dungarpur Mews

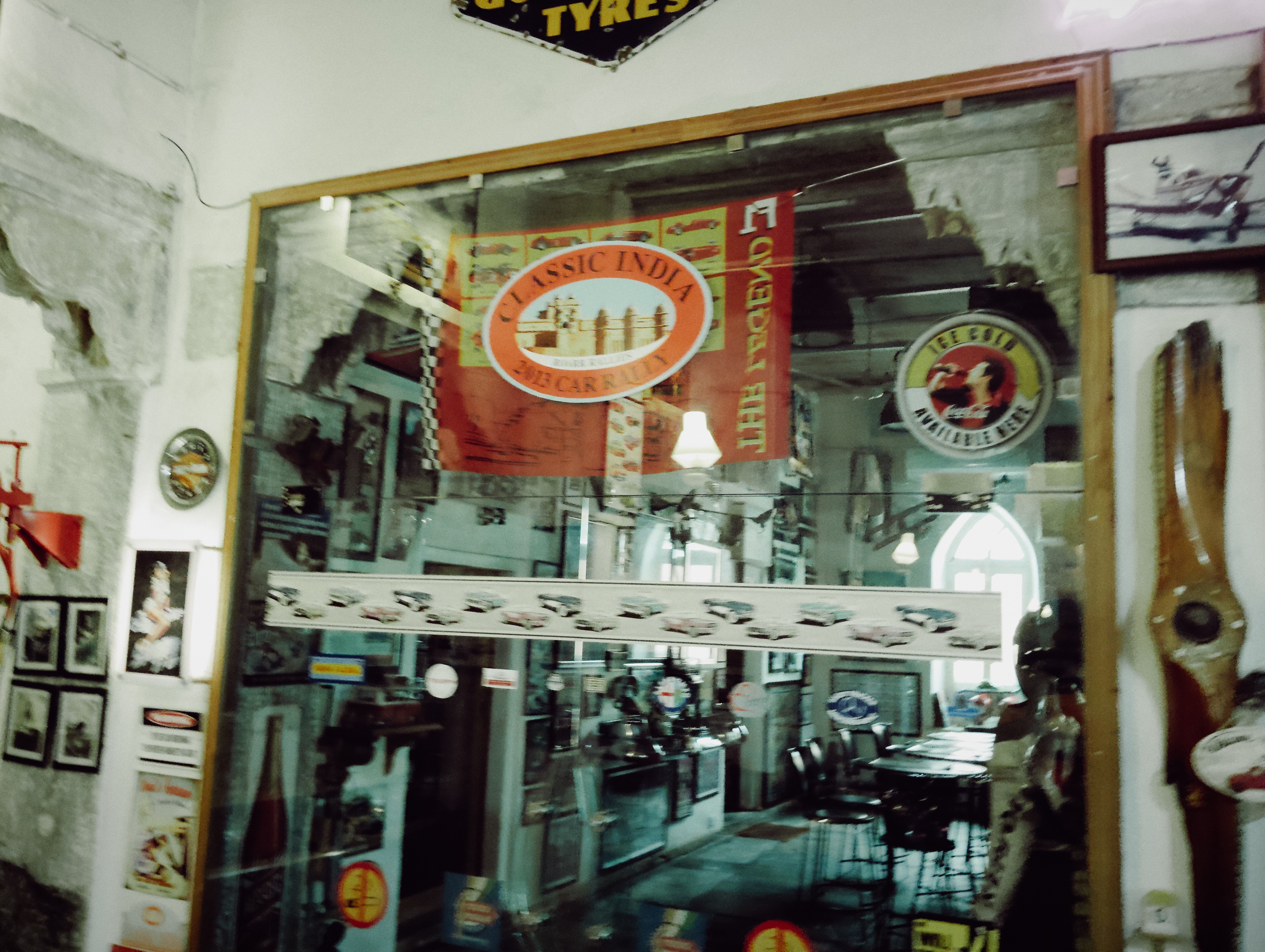
Dungarpur Mews

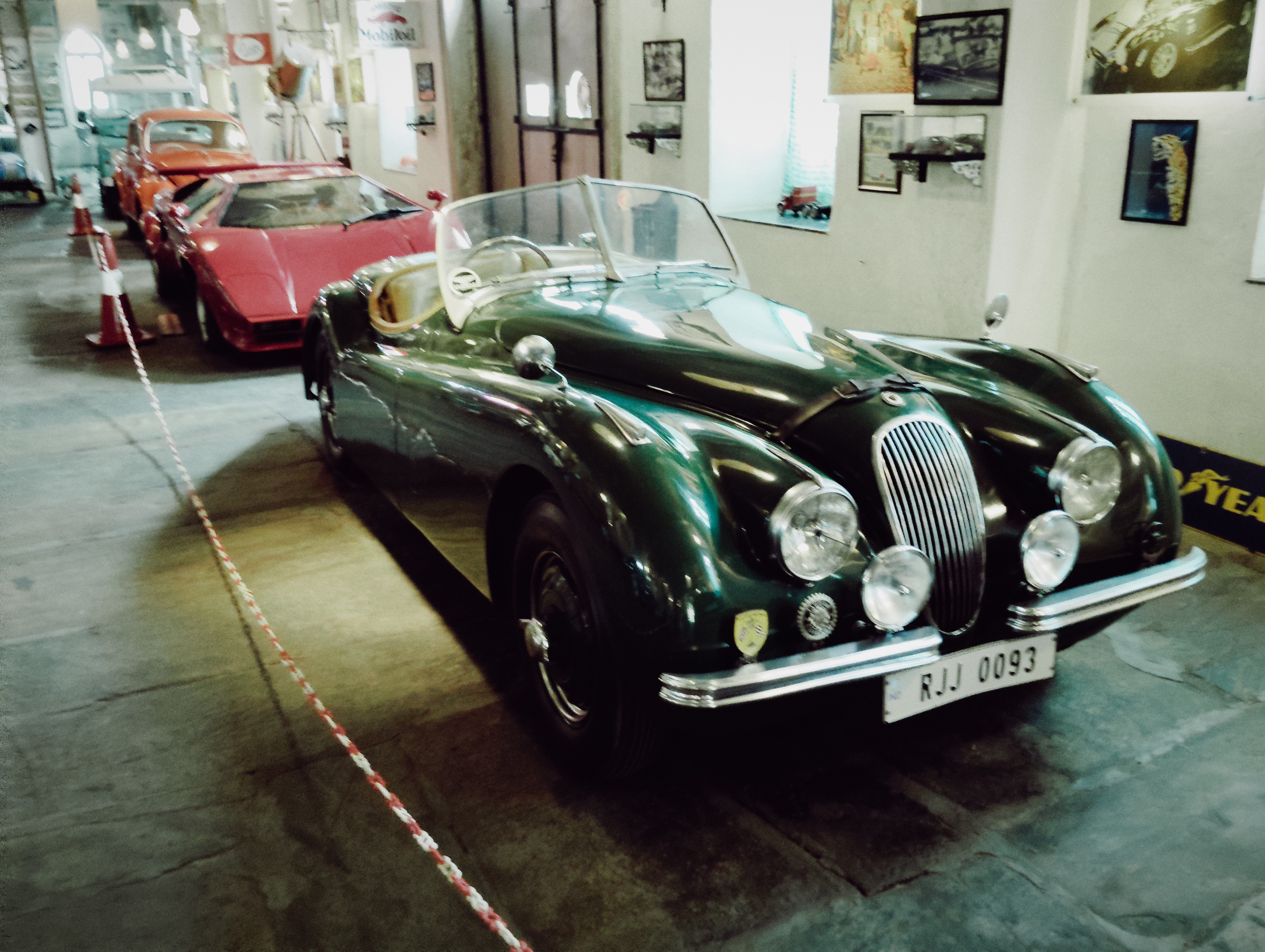
Vintage cars at Dungarpur Mews

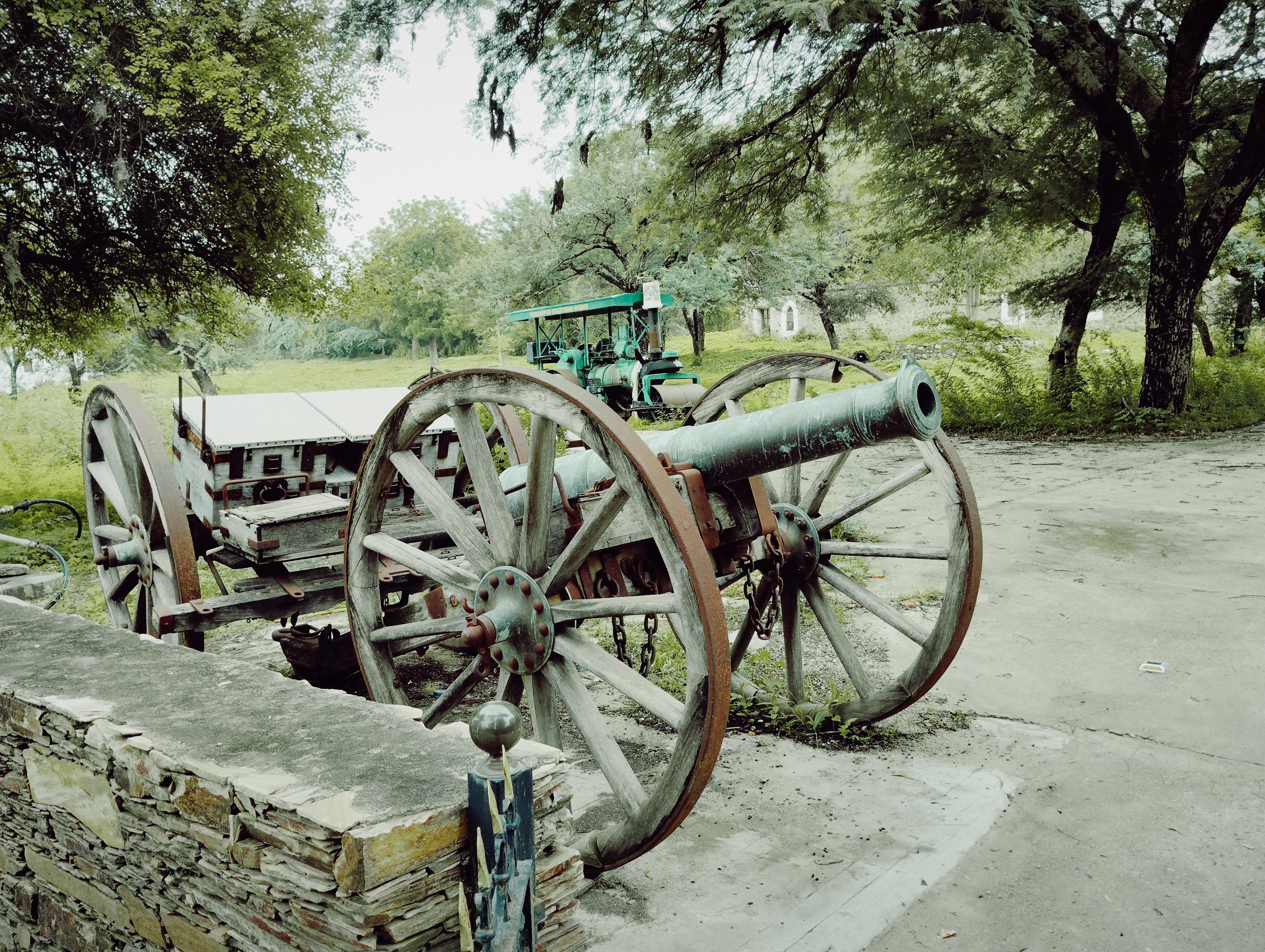
Cannon at Dungarpur Mews
