= 2013 FIBA Asia Under-16 Championship =

International men's youth basketball championship

Tournament details
- Host country: Iran
- Dates: September 25-October 4
- Teams: 16
- Venue: 1 (in 1 host city)

Final positions
- Champions: China (3rd title)
- Runners-up: Philippines
- Third place: Japan
- Fourth place: Chinese Taipei

Tournament statistics
- Top scorer: (India) Mahipal Singh (25.1 points per game)

Official website
- 2013 FIBA Asia Under-16 Championship

The 2013 FIBA Asia Under-16 Championship was the qualifying tournament for FIBA Asia at the 2014 FIBA Under-17 World Championship. The tournament was held in Tehran, Iran from September 25 to October 4.

China successfully defended their title against the first time finalists, the Philippines, 85-78, in the championship match considered as the most competitive finals so far in FIBA Asia Under-16 Championship history. Both teams, as well as Japan, who defeated Chinese Taipei for the bronze medal, 85-72, will represent FIBA Asia in the 2014 FIBA Under-17 World Championship in United Arab Emirates in 2014.

== Qualification ==
According to the FIBA Asia rules, the number of participating teams in the 2013 FIBA Asia Under-16 Championship was set at sixteen (16). Each zone had two places, and the hosts (Iran) and holders (China) were automatically qualified. The other four places were allocated to the zones according to performance in the 2011 FIBA Asia Under-16 Championship.

Central Asia (1)	East Asia (1+2+2)	Gulf (2)	South Asia (1)	Southeast Asia (2+1)	West Asia (1+2+1)
Kazakhstan	China	Bahrain	India	Philippines	Iran
	Chinese Taipei	~~Saudi Arabia~~ *		Thailand	Jordan
	Hong Kong			Malaysia	Syria
	Japan				~~TBD~~ **
	South Korea				

* Withdrew.

** Only 3 teams registered from West Asia.

== Draw ==
Group A	Group B	Group C	Group D
Bahrain; China; Hong Kong; Syria	Iran; South Korea; Malaysia; Thailand	India; Japan; Jordan	Chinese Taipei; Kazakhstan; Philippines

== Preliminary round ==
=== Group A ===
Team	Pld	W	L	PF	PA	PD	Pts
China	3	3	0	287	152	+135	6
Syria	3	2	1	210	224	−14	5
Bahrain	3	1	2	191	226	−35	4
Hong Kong	3	0	3	174	260	−86	3

September 25
15:00

Report

China	95–61	Syria
Scoring by quarter: 30–12, 23–18, 26–18, 16–13
Pts: Hu J.Q. 22; Rebs: Yuan Z.L. 14; Asts: Hu J.Q., Wang C.Z., Luo Y.X. 2		Pts: Shammas 20; Rebs: Shammas 8 Asts: Akhdir, Egho, Hadri 2

Azadi Basketball Hall, Tehran
Referees: Hamlet Arakelyan (KAZ), Sadegh Ghanbarimanab (IRI), Tee Yong Sern (MAS)

September 25
19:00

Report

Bahrain	85–60	Hong Kong
Scoring by quarter: 19–16, 22–19, 17–9, 27–16
Pts: Hasan 22; Rebs: Juma 22; Asts: Baqer 6		Pts: On K.C. 17; Rebs: Liu K.F. 14; Asts: Yang 3

Azadi Basketball Hall, Tehran
Referees: Amarjot Singh Mavi (IND), Ho Chang-Jen (TPE), Hadi Salem (IRI)

September 26
09:00

Report

Hong Kong	48–100	China
Scoring by quarter: 17–22, 12–21, 8–35, 11–22
Pts: On K.C. 11; Rebs: Liu K.F. 7 Asts: Yang 4		Pts: Hu J.Q., Zhao Y.H., Xu M.Z. 15; Rebs: Yuan Z.L. 10; Asts: Zhao Y.H., Xu M.Z. 4

Azadi Basketball Hall, Tehran
Referees: Mohd Ismail Altarawneh (JOR), Mohsen Roshan Zamir (IRI), Tee Yong Sern (MAS)

September 26
11:00

Report

Syria	74–63	Bahrain
Scoring by quarter: 19–8, 21–13, 16–23, 18–19
Pts: Shammas 19; Rebs: Hadri 12; Asts: Diab 2		Pts: Juma 31; Rebs: Juma 24; Asts: Hasan 3

Azadi Basketball Hall, Tehran
Referees: Aibara Nobuyasu (JPN), Hadi Salem (IRI), Alexey Stephanenko (KAZ)

September 27
09:00

Report

China	92–43	Bahrain
Scoring by quarter: 21–12, 19–13, 24–6, 28–12
Pts: Hu J.Q. 19; Rebs: Fu 9 Asts: Xu M.Z. 6		Pts: Hasan 15; Rebs: Hasan 10; Asts: Hasan 2

Azadi Basketball Hall, Tehran
Referees: Sadegh Ghanbarimanab (IRI), Ho Chang-Jen (TPE), Thongchai Thaweewutsophon (THA)

September 27
11:00

Report

Hong Kong	66–75	Syria
Scoring by quarter: 21–18, 15–18, 16–20, 14–19
Pts: On K.C. 17; Rebs: Liu K.F. 13; Asts: Yang 3		Pts: Hadri 26; Rebs: Khori 20; Asts: Shammas, Khori, Al Kerawan 1

Azadi Basketball Hall, Tehran
Referees: Aibara Nobuyasu (JPN), Amarjot Singh Mavi (IND), Hadi Salem (IRI)

=== Group B ===
Team	Pld	W	L	PF	PA	PD	Pts
South Korea	3	3	0	315	215	+100	6
Iran	3	2	1	253	211	+42	5
Malaysia	3	1	2	205	265	−60	4
Thailand	3	0	3	172	254	−82	3

September 25
13:00

Report

South Korea	118–65	Thailand
Scoring by quarter: 32–15, 19–17, 32–14, 34–19
Pts: Park S.K. 19; Rebs: Park S.K., Han S.H. 8 Asts: Kwon H.J. 7		Pts: Numjan 11; Rebs: Jakrawan 7 Asts: Leelaphiphatkul 2

Azadi Basketball Hall, Tehran
Referees: Aibara Nobuyasu (JPN), Mohd Ismail Altarawneh (JOR), Alexey Stephanenko (KAZ)

September 25
17:00

Report

Malaysia	68–104	Iran
Scoring by quarter: 16–31, 24–26, 14–17, 14–30
Pts: Yek L.C. 19; Rebs: Chang Z.F. 14; Asts: Foo T.J. 2		Pts: Razeghin 26; Rebs: Naziri 12; Asts: Seyedi 7

Azadi Basketball Hall, Tehran
Referees: Ahmed Ali Yaseen Al-Suwaili (IRQ), Duan Zhu (CHN), Yuen Chun Yip (HKG)

September 26
13:00

Report

Thailand	56–65	Malaysia
Scoring by quarter: 11–17, 14–17, 19–16, 12–15
Pts: Boonkong 13; Rebs: Leelaphiphatkul, Makmeesiri 8 Asts: Leelaphiphatkul 6		Pts: Tan W.J. 14; Rebs: Chang Z.F. 11; Asts: Foo T.J. 5

Azadi Basketball Hall, Tehran
Referees: Ho Chang-Jen (TPE), Hamlet Arakelyan (KAZ), Duan Zhu (CHN)

September 26
17:00

Report

Iran	78–92	South Korea
Scoring by quarter: 19–20, 23–22, 16–27, 20–23
Pts: Naziri 21; Rebs: Naziri 19; Asts: Seyedi 3		Pts: Han S.H. 24; Rebs: Han S.H. 15; Asts: Kwon H.J., Choi J.H. 3

Azadi Basketball Hall, Tehran
Referees: Ahmed Ali Yaseen Al-Suwaili (IRQ), Mohamed Hasan Alsalam (BHR), Amarjot Singh Mavi (IND)

September 27
13:00

Report

South Korea	105–72	Malaysia
Scoring by quarter: 24–16, 23–24, 25–14, 33–18
Pts: Kwon H.J. 19; Rebs: Han S.H. 11; Asts: Kwon H.J., Choi J.H. 7		Pts: Tan W.J. 17; Rebs: Lau 9 Asts: Foo T.J. 4

Azadi Basketball Hall, Tehran
Referees: Antwan Ashji (SYR), Mohd Ismail Altarawneh (JOR), Hamlet Arakelyan (KAZ)

September 27
17:00

Report

Iran	71–51	Thailand
Scoring by quarter: 23–7, 15–15, 13–6, 20–23
Pts: Razeghin 13; Rebs: Poat Kisomi 10; Asts: Seyedi 3		Pts: Jakrawan 17; Rebs: Auesatjapon 8 Asts: Leelaphiphatkul 3

Azadi Basketball Hall, Tehran
Referees: Alexey Stephanenko (KAZ), Duan Zhu (CHN), Yuen Chun Yip (HKG)

=== Group C ===
Team	Pld	W	L	PF	PA	PD	Pts
Japan	2	2	0	172	128	+44	4
Jordan	2	1	1	157	184	−27	3
India	2	0	2	168	185	−17	2

September 25
09:00

Report

India	97–100 (OT)	Jordan
Scoring by quarter: 22–20, 20–16, 23–24, 21–26, Overtime: 11–14
Pts: M. Singh 25; Rebs: Gupta 20; Asts: M. Singh 5		Pts: Abuaboud 24; Rebs: Abuaboud 15; Asts: Hijazi 3

Azadi Basketball Hall, Tehran
Referees: Duan Zhu (CHN), Mohamed Hasan Alsalam (BHR), Tee Yong Sern (MAS)

September 26
15:00

Report

Jordan	57–87	Japan
Scoring by quarter: 9–19, 12–29, 17–21, 19–18
Pts: Hijazi, Abuaboud 12; Rebs: Abuaboud 13; Asts: 4 players 1		Pts: Hachimura 20; Rebs: Hiraiwa 16; Asts: Maki 6

Azadi Basketball Hall, Tehran
Referees: Shakeeb Abdulkareem (BHR), Sadegh Ghanbarimanab (IRI), Thongchai Thaweewutsophon (THA)

September 27
15:00

Report

Japan	85–71	India
Scoring by quarter: 23–19, 21–10, 18–19, 23–23
Pts: Hachimura 25; Rebs: Hachimura 16; Asts: Hayashi 7		Pts: M. Singh 35; Rebs: Gupta 11; Asts: 4 players 1

Azadi Basketball Hall, Tehran
Referees: Haytham Alkouja (SYR), Mohd Hasan Alsalam (BHR), Mohsen Roshan Zamir (IRI)

=== Group D ===
Team	Pld	W	L	PF	PA	PD	Pts
Chinese Taipei	2	2	0	204	172	+32	4
Philippines	2	1	1	180	183	−3	3
Kazakhstan	2	0	2	170	199	−29	2

September 25
11:00

Live Stats

Chinese Taipei	109–82	Kazakhstan
Scoring by quarter: 29–20, 25–22, 27–16, 28–24
Pts: Tu S.H. 26; Rebs: Sun Y.C., Huang C.C 9 Asts: Tu S.H. 6		Pts: Voronushkin 22; Rebs: Danichenko 17; Asts: Litvinenko, Kirilin 4

Azadi Basketball Hall, Tehran
Referees: Shakeeb Abdulkareem (BHR), Mohsen Roshan Zamir (IRI), Thongchai Thaweewutsophon (THA)

September 26
19:00

Report

Kazakhstan	88–90	Philippines
Scoring by quarter: 26–28, 14–20, 32–19, 16–23
Pts: Voronushkin 22; Rebs: Neff 16; Asts: Kadyr 4		Pts: dela Cruz 19; Rebs: Escoto 19; Asts: Navarro 4

Azadi Basketball Hall, Tehran
Referees: Yuen Chun Yip (HKG), Haytham Alkouja (SYR), Antwan Ashji (SYR)

September 27
19:00

Report

Philippines	90–95	Chinese Taipei
Scoring by quarter: 24–20, 24–24, 18–24, 24–27
Pts: Mi. Nieto 26; Rebs: Mi. Nieto 16; Asts: Ma. Nieto 6		Pts: Tu S.H. 29; Rebs: Hsu C.S. 9 Asts: Chang C.T. 6

Azadi Basketball Hall, Tehran
Referees: Ahmed Ali Yaseen Al-Suwaili (IRQ), Shakeeb Abdulkareem (BHR), Tee Yong Sern (MAS)

== Second round ==
=== Group E ===
Team	Pld	W	L	PF	PA	PD	Pts
China	5	5	0	466	278	+188	10
Bahrain	5	3	2	352	378	−26	8
South Korea	5	3	2	463	397	+66	8
Iran	5	2	3	344	353	−9	7
Syria	5	2	3	345	392	−47	7
Malaysia	5	0	5	332	504	−172	5

September 28
9:00

Report

China	119–52	Malaysia
Scoring by quarter: 30–16, 33–14, 32–11, 24–11
Pts: Hu J.Q., Zhao Y.H., Fu 17; Rebs: Fu 16; Asts: Liu C.Q. 6		Pts: Foo T.J., Tan W.J. 11; Rebs: Wong M.H. 9 Asts: Foo T.J., Tan W.J., Yek L.C. 2

Azadi Basketball Hall, Tehran
Referees: Thongchai Thaweewutsophon (THA), Aibara Nobuyasu (JPN), Amarjot Singh Mavi (IND)

September 28
13:00

Report

Bahrain	82–79	South Korea
Scoring by quarter: 23–23, 22–13, 18–15, 19–28
Pts: Juma 31; Rebs: Juma 20; Asts: Hasan 3		Pts: Kwon H.J. 20; Rebs: Park S.K., Han S.H. 12; Asts: Choi J.H. 4

Azadi Basketball Hall, Tehran
Referees: Hamlet Arakelyan (KAZ), Mohd Ismail Altarawneh (JOR), Ho Chang-Jen (TPE)

September 28
17:00

Report

Syria	46–61	Iran
Scoring by quarter: 12–10, 10–18, 12–20, 12–13
Pts: Khori 17; Rebs: Hadri 13; Asts: Khori, Diab 1		Pts: Azari 15; Rebs: Naziri 9 Asts: Seyedi 5

Azadi Basketball Hall, Tehran
Referees: Ahmed Ali Yaseen Al-Suwaili (IRQ), Alexey Stephanenko (KAZ), Yuen Chun Yip (HKG)

September 29
9:00

Report

South Korea	116–82	Syria
Scoring by quarter: 30–19, 26–19, 29–23, 31–21
Pts: Yang J.H. 26; Rebs: Park S.K., Han S.H. 6 Asts: Kwon H.J. 8		Pts: Khori 19; Rebs: Hadri 13; Asts: Shammas 2

Azadi Basketball Hall, Tehran
Referees: Amarjot Singh Mavi (IND), Alexey Stephanenko (KAZ), Yuen Chun Yip (HKG)

September 29
13:00

Report

Malaysia	83–94	Bahrain
Scoring by quarter: 17–24, 18–30, 22–20, 26–20
Pts: Heng Y.T. 19; Rebs: Foo T.J. 10; Asts: Foo T.J. 4		Pts: Juma 25; Rebs: Juma 20; Asts: Ghazwan 4

Azadi Basketball Hall, Tehran
Referees: Ho Chang-Jen (TPE), Mohd Ismail Altarawneh (JOR), Thongchai Thaweewutsophon (THA)

September 29
17:00

Report

Iran	51–77	China
Scoring by quarter: 14–24, 11–10, 13–27, 13–16
Pts: Seyedi 10; Rebs: Azari, Farhadi 7 Asts: Seyedi 5		Pts: Hu J.Q. 33; Rebs: Hu J.Q. 21; Asts: Liu C.Q. 5

Azadi Basketball Hall, Tehran
Referees: Aibara Nobuyasu (JPN), Ahmed Ali Yaseen Al-Suwaili (IRQ), Hamlet Arakelyan (KAZ)

September 30
9:00

Report

China	83–71	South Korea
Scoring by quarter: 21–19, 22–16, 14–17, 26–19
Pts: Zhao Y.H. 29; Rebs: Hu J.Q., Fu 12; Asts: Xu M.Z. 3		Pts: Kwon H.J. 24; Rebs: Mun S.O. 6 Asts: Yun W.S., Choi J.H. 4

Azadi Basketball Hall, Tehran
Referees: Ahmed Ali Yaseen Al-Suwaili (IRQ), Aibara Nobuyasu (JPN), Mohd Ismail Altarawneh (JOR)

September 30
11:00

Report

Syria	82–57	Malaysia
Scoring by quarter: 20–21, 26–18, 25–10, 11–8
Pts: Hadri 21; Rebs: Hadri 14; Asts: Shammas, Khori 3		Pts: Heng Y.T. 12; Rebs: 4 players 8 Asts: 5 players 1

Azadi Basketball Hall, Tehran
Referees: Thongchai Thaweewutsophon (THA), Hamlet Arakelyan (KAZ), Ho Chang-Jen (TPE)

September 30
17:00

Report

Bahrain	70–50	Iran
Scoring by quarter: 18–10, 11–17, 14–11, 27–12
Pts: Hasan 24; Rebs: Juma 9 Asts: Ghazwan, Baqer, Hasan 1		Pts: Farhadi, Baban 11; Rebs: Azizi 8 Asts: Razeghin, Farhadi 1

Azadi Basketball Hall, Tehran
Referees: Yuen Chun Yip (HKG), Amarjot Singh Mavi (IND), Alexey Stephanenko (KAZ)

=== Group F ===
Team	Pld	W	L	PF	PA	PD	Pts
Philippines	5	4	1	425	386	+39	9
Japan	5	4	1	438	372	+66	9
Chinese Taipei	5	4	1	441	405	+36	9
Kazakhstan	5	1	4	408	423	−15	6
India	5	1	4	372	408	−36	6
Jordan	5	1	4	347	437	−90	6

September 28
11:00

Report

Jordan	60–73	Philippines
Scoring by quarter: 14–17, 17–26, 19–15, 10–15
Pts: Hijazi 14; Rebs: M. Daher, H. Almajali, Abuaboud 9 Asts: Albdour, A. Daher, Abuaboud 2		Pts: Go 22; Rebs: Mi. Nieto 20; Asts: Navarro 3

Azadi Basketball Hall, Tehran
Referees: Haytham Alkouja (SYR), Hadi Salem (IRI), Shakeeb Abdulkareem (BHR)

September 28
15:00

Report

Japan	94–74	Kazakhstan
Scoring by quarter: 33–9, 23–28, 18–18, 20–19
Pts: Hachimura 35; Rebs: Maki, Hachimura 8 Asts: Hayashi 9		Pts: Neff 25; Rebs: Neff 7 Asts: Kadyr, Voronushkin, Kirilin 2

Azadi Basketball Hall, Tehran
Referees: Duan Zhu (CHN), Antwan Ashji (SYR), Sadegh Ghanbarimanab (IRI)

September 28
19:00

Report

India	69–80	Chinese Taipei
Scoring by quarter: 17–27, 17–25, 18–15, 17–13
Pts: M. Singh 34; Rebs: Gupta 6 Asts: M. Singh, Tudu 2		Pts: Wu Y.J. 21; Rebs: Hsu C.S. 11; Asts: Chang C.T. 6

Azadi Basketball Hall, Tehran
Referees: Tee Yong Sern (MAS), Mohd Hasan Alsalam (BHR), Mohsen Roshan Zamir (IRI)

September 29
11:00

Report

Philippines	94–76	Japan
Scoring by quarter: 23–16, 19–18, 36–19, 16–23
Pts: Mi. Nieto 21; Rebs: Mi. Nieto 12; Asts: Ma. Nieto 3		Pts: Maki 16; Rebs: Hachimura 11; Asts: Hayashi 6

Azadi Basketball Hall, Tehran
Referees: Duan Zhu (CHN), Sadegh Ghanbarimanab (IRI), Tee Yong Sern (MAS)

September 29
15:00

Report

Chinese Taipei	81–68	Jordan
Scoring by quarter: 24–13, 21–23, 24–13, 12–19
Pts: Tu S.H. 18; Rebs: Tung C.C. 10; Asts: Chang C.T., Wu Y.J. 3		Pts: Hijazi 19; Rebs: Abuaboud 23; Asts: Hijazi 3

Azadi Basketball Hall, Tehran
Referees: Haytham Alkouja (SYR), Mohd Hasan Alsalam (BHR), Mohsen Roshan Zamir (IRI)

September 29
19:00

Report

Kazakhstan	65–68	India
Scoring by quarter: 13–11, 16–16, 11–22, 25–19
Pts: Kirilin 15; Rebs: Neff 14; Asts: Kirilin 4		Pts: M. Singh 22; Rebs: Kanderiya 10; Asts: M. Singh, Tudu 2

Azadi Basketball Hall, Tehran
Referees: Hadi Salem (IRI), Antwan Ashji (SYR), Shakeeb Abdulkareem (BHR)

September 30
13:00

Report

Jordan	62–99	Kazakhstan
Scoring by quarter: 12–18, 11–25, 16–22, 23–34
Pts: R. Almajali 18; Rebs: Abuaboud 12; Asts: Hijazi 5		Pts: Litvinenko 22; Rebs: Aytkali 9 Asts: Kadyr 10

Azadi Basketball Hall, Tehran
Referees: Duan Zhu (CHN), Mohd Hasan Alsalam (BHR), Hadi Salem (IRI)

September 30
15:00

Report

Japan	96–76	Chinese Taipei
Scoring by quarter: 23–27, 16–12, 25–20, 32–17
Pts: Hachimura 26; Rebs: Hiraiwa 14; Asts: Muto 3		Pts: Sun Y.C. 16; Rebs: Sun Y.C. 10; Asts: Chang C.T. 2

Azadi Basketball Hall, Tehran
Referees: Shakeeb Abdulkareem (BHR), Haytham Alkouja (SYR), Sadegh Ghanbarimanab (IRI)

September 30
19:00

Report

India	67–78	Philippines
Scoring by quarter: 11–17, 14–14, 22–31, 20–16
Pts: M. Singh, Maan 14; Rebs: Hooda 8 Asts: Tudu 4		Pts: Go 26; Rebs: 4 players 8 Asts: Ma. Nieto 4

Azadi Basketball Hall, Tehran
Referees: Mohsen Roshan Zamir (IRI), Antwan Ashji (SYR), Tee Yong Sern (MAS)

== Classification 9th–12th ==
Semifinals
October 2 (OT)
India	80
Malaysia (OT)	82
October 2
Syria	55
Jordan	66

9th place
October 3
Malaysia	86
Jordan	80
11th place
October 3
India	81
Syria	67

=== Semifinals ===
October 2
9:00

Report

Malaysia	82–80 (OT)	India
Scoring by quarter: 16–9, 19–15, 8–16, 24–27, Overtime: 15–13
Pts: Chang Z.F. 26; Rebs: Chang Z.F. 13; Asts: Foo T.J. 8		Pts: M. Singh 26; Rebs: Gupta 12; Asts: Tudu 5

Azadi Basketball Hall, Tehran
Referees: Shakeeb Abdulkareem (BHR), Ho Chang-Jen (TPE), Hadi Salem (IRI)

October 2
11:00

Report

Syria	55–66	Jordan
Scoring by quarter: 13–20, 13–13, 16–12, 13–21
Pts: Hadri 19; Rebs: Khori 17; Asts: Akhdir, Shammas 2		Pts: M. Daher 20; Rebs: M. Daher, Abuaboud 12; Asts: Hijazi 6

Azadi Basketball Hall, Tehran
Referees: Mohd Hasan Alsalam (BHR), Hamlet Arakelyan (KAZ), Mohsen Roshan Zamir (IRI)

=== 11th place ===
October 3
9:00

Report

India	81–67	Syria
Scoring by quarter: 22–10, 21–16, 23–18, 15–23
Pts: M. Singh 19; Rebs: Gupta 11; Asts: Mehla 3		Pts: Shammas 22; Rebs: Shammas 8 Asts: Shammas 4

Azadi Basketball Hall, Tehran
Referees: Mohd Ismail Altarawneh (JOR), Mohd Hasan Alsalam (BHR), Thongchai Thaweewutsophon (THA)

=== 9th place ===
October 3
11:00

Report

Malaysia	86–80	Jordan
Scoring by quarter: 19–19, 17–21, 21–24, 29–16
Pts: Tan W.J., Yek L.C. 21; Rebs: Yek L.C. 10; Asts: Foo T.J., Chong K.W. 5		Pts: Hijazi 28; Rebs: Abuaboud 9 Asts: Hijazi 5

Azadi Basketball Hall, Tehran
Referees: Yuen Chun Yip (HKG), Amarjot Singh Mavi (IND), Mohsen Roshan Zamir (IRI)

== Final round ==
Quarterfinals
October 2
China	102
Kazakhstan	75
October 2
Japan	75
South Korea	71
October 2
Philippines	79
Iran	52
October 2
Bahrain	67
Chinese Taipei	70

Semifinals
October 3
China	99
Japan	78
October 3
Philippines	77
Chinese Taipei	72

Final
October 4
China	85
Philippines	78
3rd place
October 4
Japan	85
Chinese Taipei	72

Semifinals
October 3
Kazakhstan	75
South Korea	88
October 3
Iran	79
Bahrain	56

5th place
October 4
South Korea	66
Iran	53
7th place
October 4
Kazakhstan	97
Bahrain	42

=== Quarterfinals ===
October 2
13:00

Report

South Korea	71–75	Japan
Scoring by quarter: 21–24, 24–18, 17–16, 9–17
Pts: Choi J.H., Yang J.H. 15; Rebs: Kwon H.J., Park S.K. 9 Asts: Mun S.O. 2		Pts: Maki 25; Rebs: Hachimura 25; Asts: Maki 4

Azadi Basketball Hall, Tehran
Referees: Yuen Chun Yip (HKG), Amarjot Singh Mavi (IND), Tee Yong Sern (MAS)

October 2
15:00

Report

Bahrain	67–70	Chinese Taipei
Scoring by quarter: 12–26, 11–15, 23–15, 21–14
Pts: Juma 26; Rebs: Juma 12; Asts: Hasan 2		Pts: Chang C.T. 15; Rebs: Sun Y.C., Tu S.H. 10; Asts: Chang C.T. 3

Azadi Basketball Hall, Tehran
Referees: Haytham Alkouja (SYR), Aibara Nobuyasu (JPN), Mohd Ismail Altarawneh (JOR)

October 2
17:00

Report

Iran	52–79	Philippines
Scoring by quarter: 14–22, 10–16, 22–19, 6–22
Pts: Farhadi 26; Rebs: Naziri 11; Asts: Sheikhi 4		Pts: Mendoza 16; Rebs: Escoto 10; Asts: Navarro 7

Azadi Basketball Hall, Tehran
Referees: Ahmed Ali Yaseen Al-Suwaili (IRQ), Duan Zhu (CHN), Alexey Stephanenko (KAZ)

October 2
19:00

Report

China	102–75	Kazakhstan
Scoring by quarter: 18–14, 30–15, 26–21, 28–25
Pts: Hu J.Q. 29; Rebs: Hu J.Q. 14; Asts: Liu C.Q. 6		Pts: Danichenko 16; Rebs: Aytkali 8 Asts: Kadyr, Kirilin 4

Azadi Basketball Hall, Tehran
Referees: Antwan Ashji (SYR), Sadegh Ghanbarimanab (IRI), Thongchai Thaweewutsophon (THA)

=== Semifinals 5th–8th ===
October 3
13:00

Report

Kazakhstan	75–88	South Korea
Scoring by quarter: 17–26, 17–18, 17–26, 24–18
Pts: Litvinenko, Neff 19; Rebs: Neff 14; Asts: Kadyr 3		Pts: Park M.U. 21; Rebs: Park M.U., Park S.K., Yang J.M. 6 Asts: Kwon H.J. 7

Azadi Basketball Hall, Tehran
Referees: Duan Zhu (CHN), Antwan Ashji (SYR), Hadi Salem (IRI)

October 3
15:00

Report

Bahrain	56–79	Iran
Scoring by quarter: 13–10, 14–9, 9–35, 20–25
Pts: Juma 29; Rebs: Hasan, Juma 9 Asts: Al-Musalli 2		Pts: Baban 22; Rebs: Farhadi 11; Asts: Seyedi 5

Azadi Basketball Hall, Tehran
Referees: Ho Chang-Jen (TPE), Aibara Nobuyasu (JPN), Hamlet Arakelyan (KAZ)

=== Semifinals ===
October 3
17:00

Report

China	99–78	Japan
Scoring by quarter: 17–26, 17–18, 17–26, 24–18
Pts: Zhao Y.H. 32; Rebs: Hu J.Q. 24; Asts: Xu M.Z. 3		Pts: Hachimura 25; Rebs: Hachimura 8 Asts: Hayashi, Taira, Igarashi 2

Azadi Basketball Hall, Tehran
Referees: Ahmed Ali Yaseen Al-Suwaili (IRQ), Haytham Alkouja (SYR), Tee Yong Sern (MAS)

October 3
19:00

Report

Chinese Taipei	72–77	Philippines
Scoring by quarter: 17–23, 20–19, 20–12, 15–23
Pts: Tu S.H., Hsu C.S. 14; Rebs: Wu Y.J. 10; Asts: Wu Y.J. 5		Pts: Mendoza 28; Rebs: Desiderio 15; Asts: Ma. Nieto 6

Azadi Basketball Hall, Tehran
Referees: Shakeeb Abdulkareem (BHR), Sadegh Ghanbarimanab (IRI), Alexey Stephanenko (KAZ)

=== 7th place ===
October 4
11:00

Report

Kazakhstan	97–42	Bahrain
Scoring by quarter: 15–8, 28–15, 22–8, 32–11
Pts: Litvinenko 19; Rebs: Litvinenko 12; Asts: Kirilin 9		Pts: Al-Musalli, Mohamed, Juma 8 Rebs: Al-Madeh 8 Asts: Al-Madeh, Husain, Shakeeb 1

Azadi Basketball Hall, Tehran
Referees: Duan Zhu (CHN), Amarjot Singh Mavi (IND), Thongchai Thaweewutsophon (THA)

=== 5th place ===
October 4
13:00

Report

South Korea	66–53	Iran
Scoring by quarter: 16–18, 22–15, 18–13, 10–7
Pts: Park M.U. 18; Rebs: Park S.K. 15; Asts: Kwon H.J. 7		Pts: Razeghin 16; Rebs: Baban 10; Asts: Seyedi 4

Azadi Basketball Hall, Tehran
Referees: Aibara Nobuyasu (JPN), Antwan Ashji (SYR), Ho Chang-Jen (TPE)

=== 3rd place ===
October 4
15:00

Report

Japan	85–72	Chinese Taipei
Scoring by quarter: 25–19, 20–12, 14–20, 26–21
Pts: Maki 23; Rebs: Hiraiwa 9 Asts: Maki 5		Pts: Hsu C.S. 18; Rebs: Hsu C.S. 17; Asts: Chen P.H., Wu Y.J., Hsu C.S. 2

Azadi Basketball Hall, Tehran
Referees: Haytham Alkouja (SYR), Alexey Stephanenko (KAZ), Yuen Chun Yip (HKG)

=== Final ===
October 4
17:00

Report

China	85–78	Philippines
Scoring by quarter: 24–20, 18–15, 17–20, 26–23
Pts: Zhao Y.H. 25; Rebs: Fu 18; Asts: Liu C.Q., Fu 4		Pts: Mendoza 20; Rebs: Padilla 9 Asts: Padilla 3

Azadi Basketball Hall, Tehran
Referees: Ahmed Ali Yaseen Al-Suwaili (IRQ), Sadegh Ghanbarimanab (IRI), Shakeeb Abdulkareem (BHR)

== Final standing ==
Qualified for the 2014 FIBA Under-17 World Championship

Rank	Team	Record
1st place, gold medalist(s)	China	9–0
2nd place, silver medalist(s)	Philippines	7–2
3rd place, bronze medalist(s)	Japan	7–2
4	Chinese Taipei	6–3
5	South Korea	6–3
6	Iran	4–5
7	Kazakhstan	3–6
8	Bahrain	4–5
9	Malaysia	3–5
10	Jordan	2–5
11	India	2–5
12	Syria	3–5
13	Thailand	0–3
13	Hong Kong	0–3

== Awards ==
2013 Asian Under-16 champions

China
Third title
