= Qatar men's national under-16 basketball team =

Qatar
- FIBA zone: FIBA Asia
- National federation: Qatar Basketball Federation

U17 World Cup
- Appearances: None

U16 Asia Cup
- Appearances: 3
- Medals: None
Home	Away

The Qatar men's national under-16 basketball team is a national basketball team of Qatar, administered by the Qatar Basketball Federation (Arabic: الاتحاد القطري لكرة السلة). It represents the country in men's international under-16 basketball competitions.

== FIBA U16 Asia Cup participations ==
Year	Result
2011	11th
2022	9th
2023	7th

== See also ==
- Qatar men's national basketball team
- Qatar women's national basketball team
- Qatar men's national under-19 basketball team
- Qatar men's national 3x3 team
