= Bahrain men's national under-16 basketball team =

Bahrain
- FIBA zone: FIBA Asia
- National federation: Bahrain Basketball Association

U17 World Cup
- Appearances: None

U16 Asia Cup
- Appearances: 6
- Medals: None

The Bahrain men's national under-16 basketball team is a national basketball team of Bahrain, administered by the Bahrain Basketball Association. It represents the country in international under-16 men's basketball competitions.

== FIBA U16 Asia Cup participations ==
Year	Result
2009	12th
2013	8th
2015	12th
2022	13th
2023	15th
2025	8th

== See also ==
- Bahrain men's national basketball team
- Bahrain men's national under-18 basketball team
