= Syria men's national under-16 basketball team =

Syria
- FIBA ranking: 91 ▼12 (December 2024)
- Joined FIBA: 1948
- FIBA zone: FIBA Asia
- National federation: Syrian Basketball Federation
- Nickname(s): Nosour Qasioun (Arabic: نسور قاسيون, lit. 'Qasioun Eagles')

U17 World Cup
- Appearances: None

U16 Asia Cup
- Appearances: 2 (2009, 2013)
- Medals: None

U16 EuroBasket
- Appearances: 1 (1979)
- Medals: None
Home	Away

The Syria men's national under-16 basketball team is a national basketball team of Syria, administered by the Syrian Basketball Federation. It represents the country in men's international under-16 basketball competitions.

== Competition record ==
=== FIBA Under-17 Basketball World Cup ===
Syria has not yet qualified for the FIBA Under-17 Basketball World Cup.

=== FIBA Under-16 Asia Cup ===
FIBA Under-16 Asia Cup record
Year	Position	Pld	W	L
(Malaysia) 2009	7th place	8	3	5
(Vietnam) 2011	Did not qualify			
(Iran) 2013	12th place	8	3	5
(Indonesia) 2015	Did not qualify			
(China) 2017	Did not qualify			
(Qatar) 2022	Did not qualify			
(Qatar) 2023	Did not qualify			
Total	0 golds, 0 silvers, 0 bronzes	16	6	10

=== FIBA U16 EuroBasket ===
FIBA U16 EuroBasket record
Year	Position	Pld	W	L
(Italy) 1971 to (France) 1977	Did not participate			
(Syria) 1979	7th place	6	2	4
(Greece) 1981 to (North Macedonia) 2022	Did not participate			
Total	0 golds, 0 silvers, 0 bronzes	6	2	4

== See also ==
- Syria men's national basketball team
- Syria men's national under-19 basketball team
- Syria women's national under-16 basketball team
