= Lebanon men's national under-17 basketball team =

Lebanon
- FIBA ranking: 36 ▲3 (Dec 2024)
- Joined FIBA: 1947
- FIBA zone: FIBA Asia
- National federation: FLB
- Coach: Gilbert Nasr

U17 World Cup
- Appearances: 1
- Medals: None

U16 Asia Cup
- Appearances: 6
- Medals: None
Home	Away

The Lebanon men's national under-16 and under-17 basketball team is a national basketball team of Lebanon, administered by Lebanese Basketball Federation. It represents the country in international under-16 and under-17 men's basketball competitions.

== History ==
The team was able to reach the semifinals at 2022 FIBA U16 Asian Championship which awarded Lebanon participation at 2022 FIBA Under-17 Basketball World Cup. That marked first time representation for Lebanon at the global event. At 2022 FIBA Under-17 Basketball World Cup, Lebanon lost all their games and finished 16th overall.

== Tournament records ==
=== FIBA Under-17 World Cup ===
Year	Pos	Pld	W	L
2010 to 2018	Did not qualify			
(Spain) 2022	16th	7	0	7
(Turkey) 2024	Did not qualify			
(Turkey) 2026	Did not qualify			
(Greece) 2028	To be determined			
Total	1/9	7	0	7

=== FIBA Under-16 Asia Cup ===
FIBA Under-16 Asia Cup					WABA Qualifier		
Year	Pos	Pld	W	L	Pld	W	L
(Malaysia) 2009	Did not participate						
(Vietnam) 2011	6th	9	4	5			
(Iran) 2013	Did not participate						
(Indonesia) 2015	6th	9	6	3			
(China) 2017	8th	7	2	5	4	3	1
(Qatar) 2022	4th	6	3	3	4	3	1
(Qatar) 2023	11th	4	1	3			
(Mongolia) 2025	9th	4	1	3	4	4	0
Total	6/8	39	17	22	12	10	2

== See also ==
- Sport in Lebanon
- Lebanon men's national basketball team
- Lebanon men's national under-19 basketball team
- Lebanon women's national basketball team
- Lebanon women's national under-18 basketball team
- Lebanon women's national under-16 basketball team
