= Jordan men's national under-16 basketball team =

Jordan
- FIBA zone: FIBA Asia
- National federation: Jordan Basketball Federation

U17 World Cup
- Appearances: None

U16 Asia Cup
- Appearances: 3
- Medals: None

The Jordan men's national under-16 basketball team is a national basketball team of Jordan, administered by the Jordan Basketball Federation. It represents the country in men's international under-16 basketball competitions.

== FIBA U16 Asia Cup participations ==
Year	Result
2009	8th
2013	10th
2023	8th

== See also ==
- Jordan men's national basketball team
- Jordan men's national under-18 basketball team
- Jordan women's national under-16 basketball team
