= Mahipal Singh =

Maharawal of Dungarpur from 1989 to 2023

- Maharawal

Maharawal of Dungarpur
- Reign: 6 June 1989 – 19 August 2023
- Predecessor: Laxman Singh
- Successor: Harshvardhan Singh
- Born: 14 August 1931
- Died: 19 August 2023 (aged 92)
- Spouse: Dev Kumari
- Issue: Harshvardhan Singh; Kirti Kumari
- Father: Laxman Singh
- Mother: Manhar Kumari

Mahipal Singh was the Maharawal of Dungarpur from 1989 until his death in 2023.

== Birth and education ==
He was born on 14 August 1931 to Laxman Singh. He received his education at Mayo College, Ajmer, and graduated from St. Stephen's College, Delhi.

== Succession ==
After the death of his father on 6 June 1989, Laxman Singh, who held the title of Maharawal of Dungarpur for 70 years, he succeeded him to the title. However, he was only a namesake Maharawal, as the Government of India had abolished privileges, privy purses, and the official recognition of titles long before his succession in 1971.

== Personal life ==
He married Dev Kumari, the daughter of Bijay Singh and granddaughter of Ganga Singh, the Maharaja of Bikaner. He had two children with her: a son, Harshvardhan Singh, and a daughter, Kirti Kumari. Kirti married Daivat Singh of Sirohi.

== Death ==
He died on 19 August 2023. His funeral rituals were held at Udai Bilas Palace, and his last rites were performed at Surpur Rajghat.
