= Harshvardhan Singh Dungarpur =

Indian politician

Member of Parliament Rajya Sabha
- In office 5 July 2016 – 4 July 2022
- Preceded by: Ram Jethmalani, Independent
- Succeeded by: Pramod Tiwari, INC
- Constituency: Rajasthan

Personal details
- Born: 6 June 1956 (age 70) Bikaner, Rajasthan, India
- Party: Bharatiya Janata Party
- Spouse: Priyadarshini Kumari Dungarpur
- Relations: Dungarpur Royal Family
- Children: Three daughters One Son
- Parent(s): Mahipal Singh (Father); Dev Kumari (mother)
- Education: B.A. (Hons.) Educated at St. Xavier's College, University of Mumbai
- Profession: Business
- Website: National Portal of India

Harshvardhan Singh Dungarpur (born 6 June 1956) is an Indian politician. He was a Rajya Sabha member from Rajasthan belonging to the Bharatiya Janata Party.
