= India men's national under-16 basketball team =

India
- Joined FIBA: 1936
- FIBA zone: FIBA Asia
- National federation: Basketball Federation of India
- Coach: Vibhor Bhriguvanshi
- Nickname: The Young Cagers

U17 World Cup
- Appearances: None

U16 Asia Cup
- Appearances: 8
- Medals: None
Home	Away

The India men's national under-16 basketball team is a national basketball team of India, administered by the Basketball Federation of India. It represents the country in international under-16 men's basketball competitions.

The best performance of the team so far is the 5th place at the 2022 FIBA U16 Asian Championship.

== FIBA U16 Asia Cup participations ==
Year	Result
2009	10th
2011	10th
2013	11th
2015	13th
2017	13th
2022	5th
2023	9th
2025	16th

== See also ==
- India men's national basketball team
- India men's national under-18 basketball team
- India women's national under-16 basketball team
