= Kazakhstan men's national under-16 basketball team =

Kazakhstan
- FIBA zone: FIBA Asia
- National federation: Kazakhstan Basketball Federation

U17 World Cup
- Appearances: None

U16 Asia Cup
- Appearances: 5
- Medals: None

The Kazakhstan men's national under-16 basketball team is a national basketball team of Kazakhstan, administered by the Kazakhstan Basketball Federation. It represents the country in international under-16 men's basketball competitions.

== FIBA U16 Asia Cup participations ==
Year	Result
2009	9th
2013	7th
2022	10th
2023	13th
2025	12th

== See also ==
- Kazakhstan men's national basketball team
- Kazakhstan men's national under-19 basketball team
- Kazakhstan women's national under-16 basketball team
