= China men's national under-17 basketball team =

China
- FIBA zone: FIBA Asia
- National federation: Basketball Association of the People's Republic of China
- Coach: Wang Jianjun

U17 World Cup
- Appearances: 7

U16 Asia Cup
- Appearances: 7
- Medals: (gold) Gold: (2009, 2011, 2013); (silver) Silver: (2017, 2025); (bronze) Bronze: (2015, 2023)
Home	Away

The China men's national under-16 and under-17 basketball team is a national basketball team of the People's Republic of China, administered by the Basketball Association of the People's Republic of China. It represents the country in international under-16 and under-17 men's basketball competitions.

== Tournament record ==
=== FIBA U17 World Cup ===
Year	Pos.	Pld	W	L
(Germany) 2010	7th	8	4	4
(Lithuania) 2012	7th	8	4	4
(United Arab Emirates) 2014	7th	7	3	4
(Spain) 2016	10th	7	3	4
(Argentina) 2018	15th	7	1	6
(Spain) 2022	Did not participate			
(Turkey) 2024	13th	7	3	4
(Turkey) 2026	10th	7	3	4
(Greece) 2028	To be determined			
Total	7/9	44	18	26

=== FIBA U16 Asia Cup ===
Year	Result
2009	1st place, gold medalist(s)
2011	1st place, gold medalist(s)
2013	1st place, gold medalist(s)
2015	3rd place, bronze medalist(s)
2017	2nd place, silver medalist(s)
2022	DNP
2023	3rd place, bronze medalist(s)
2025	2nd place, silver medalist(s)

== See also ==
- China men's national basketball team
- China men's national under-19 basketball team
- China women's national under-17 basketball team
