= 2023 FIBA U16 Asian Championship =

Under-16 men's basketball tournament in Qatar

7th FIBA Under-16 Asian Basketball Championship

Tournament details
- Host country: Qatar
- City: Doha
- Dates: 17–24 September
- Teams: 16 (from 1 confederation)
- Venue(s): 2 (in 1 host city)

Final positions
- Champions: Australia (3rd title)
- Runners-up: New Zealand
- Third place: China

Tournament statistics
- MVP: (New Zealand) Oscar Goodman
- Top scorer: (Qatar) Ndao (26.0)
- Top rebounds: (Qatar) Ndao (13.0)
- Top assists: (New Zealand) Jones (4.3)
- PPG (Team): Australia (108.2)
- RPG (Team): Australia (56.5)
- APG (Team): Australia (28.2)

Official website
- www.fiba.basketball/history

The 2023 FIBA U16 Asian Championship was the seventh edition of the FIBA U16 Asian Championship in the International Basketball Federation's FIBA Asia zone. The tournament was held at the Al-Gharafa Indoor Hall and the Al-Rayyan Indoor Hall in Doha, Qatar, from 17 to 24 September 2023. It served as a qualifier for the 2024 FIBA Under-17 Basketball World Cup in Turkey, where the top four teams qualified.

Australia successfully defended their U16 title against first-time semifinalists New Zealand in the thrilling final, 79–76, while China clinched the bronze medal after defeating the Philippines in the battle for third place, 87–59.

== Qualification ==
=== Allocation of berths ===
According to FIBA Asia rules, the number of participating teams in the FIBA U16 Asian Championship was set at 16. The hosts and the defending champions qualified automatically. All FIBA Asia subzones got two berths each, except for the Central and South Asian subzones, which got one berth each. FIBA Oceania also got one berth. The last three berths were allocated to Asian subzones based on their teams' results in the 2022 FIBA U16 Asian Championship.

Allocation of berths
Subzone	Automatic qualifiers		Default berths	Additional berths as top 3 Asian teams from last championship	Total
Subzone	Hosts	Defending champions	Default berths	Additional berths as top 3 Asian teams from last championship	Total
Central Asia	0	0	1	0	1
East Asia	0	0	2	1	3
Gulf	1	0	2	0	3
South Asia	0	0	1	1	2
Southeast Asia	0	0	2	0	2
West Asia	0	0	2	1	3
FIBA Oceania	0	1	1	—	2
Total	1	1	11	3	16

=== Qualified teams ===
The following is the list of the qualified teams. FIBA Boys' World Rankings as of 15 December 2022 are in parentheses.

Means of qualification	Date	Venue	Vacancies	Qualifiers
Host nation	27 January 2020	N/A	1	Qatar (58)
Defending champions	12–19 June 2022	(Qatar) Doha	1	Australia (4)
Central Asia qualifiers	27–29 June 2023	(Uzbekistan) Samarkand	1	Kazakhstan (77)
East Asia, based on FIBA Boys' World Ranking^{[Note 1]}	N/A	N/A	3	China (27); South Korea (29); Japan (31)
GCC U16 Basketball Championship 2023	25–31 July 2023	(Saudi Arabia) Jeddah	2	Bahrain (65); Saudi Arabia (NR)
SABA U16 Championship 2023	28–31 August 2023	(Sri Lanka) Colombo	2	India (34); Sri Lanka (NR)
2023 SEABA Under-16 Championship	17–19 July 2023	(Indonesia) Surabaya	2	Philippines (26); Malaysia (72)
West Asia qualifiers	N/A	N/A	3	Iran (22); Lebanon (39); Jordan (NR)
2022 FIBA Under-15 Oceania Championship	21–26 November 2022	(Guam) Mangilao	1	New Zealand (25)

^{Note 1} The federation of Chinese Taipei protested the decision by the East Asia Basketball Federation Association to use FIBA rankings to determine the qualified teams instead of holding a tournament.

== Preliminary round ==
All times are local (UTC+3).

=== Group A ===
Pos	Team	Pld	W	L	PF	PA	PD	Pts	Qualification
1	Australia	3	3	0	361	119	+242	6	Quarterfinals
2	India	3	2	1	238	222	+16	5	Playoffs
3	Lebanon	3	1	2	211	232	−21	4	Playoffs
4	Sri Lanka	3	0	3	110	347	−237	3	

Source: FIBA
Rules for classification: 1) Points; 2) Head-to-head results; 3) Points difference; 4) Points scored.

17 September 2023
11:30

Boxscore

Australia	114–50	India
Scoring by quarter: 33–14, 36–10, 22–10, 23–16
Pts: Cotton 16; Rebs: Cotton 9 Asts: Beauchamp, Dickeson 6		Pts: Joby 10; Rebs: L. Sharma 6 Asts: Lavish 5

Al-Gharafa Indoor Hall, Doha
Referees: Sherhon Martin (NZL), Harry Santos (PHI), Rashid Al Musheifri (OMA)

17 September 2023
19:30

Boxscore

Lebanon	99–45	Sri Lanka
Scoring by quarter: 27–14, 30–13, 26–12, 16–6
Pts: El Dekss 32; Rebs: Iskandar 9 Asts: Hachem 7		Pts: Herath 18; Rebs: Herath 8 Asts: Bernard 4

Al-Gharafa Indoor Hall, Doha
Referees: Mohammed Hasan Fanharawi (IRQ), Harry Santos (PHI), Rashid Al Musheifri (OMA)

18 September 2023
14:30

Boxscore

Australia	136–26	Sri Lanka
Scoring by quarter: 37–8, 31–3, 35–6, 33–9
Pts: Pilimai 20; Rebs: Pilimai 7 Asts: three players 5		Pts: Samarawickrama 9 Rebs: three players 2 Asts: Bernard, Samarawickrama 3

Al-Gharafa Indoor Hall, Doha
Referees: Elie Rahji (SYR), Rashid Al Musheifri (OMA), Hum Zhung Liang (MAS)

18 September 2023
19:30

Boxscore

India	76–69	Lebanon
Scoring by quarter: 27–16, 19–12, 16–21, 14–20
Pts: L. Sharma 24; Rebs: three players 10; Asts: Dhanasekar 4		Pts: El Dekss 22; Rebs: El Dekss 15; Asts: three players 4

Al-Gharafa Indoor Hall, Doha
Referees: Li Jin (CHN), Anton Kozlov (KAZ), Adel Mohamed Ghuloom (BHN)

19 September 2023
14:30

Boxscore

Sri Lanka	39–112	India
Scoring by quarter: 4–33, 17–35, 10–25, 8–19
Pts: Herath 22; Rebs: Mudianselage 18; Asts: Annakkarge, Bernard 3		Pts: Ankush 27; Rebs: A. Sharma 9 Asts: Dhanasekar 5

Al-Gharafa Indoor Hall, Doha
Referees: Anton Kozlov (KAZ), Rashid Al Musheifri (OMA), Hum Zhung Liang (MAS)

19 September 2023
19:30

Boxscore

Lebanon	43–111	Australia
Scoring by quarter: 5–27, 18–27, 11–33, 9–24
Pts: Iskandar 9 Rebs: El Dekss 12; Asts: Iskandar, El Boustani 2		Pts: Daniels 21; Rebs: Sewell 10; Asts: four players 4

Al-Gharafa Indoor Hall, Doha
Referees: Li Jin (CHN), Adel Mohamed Ghuloom (BHR), Mohammed Ismail Altarawneh (JOR)

=== Group B ===
Pos	Team	Pld	W	L	PF	PA	PD	Pts	Qualification
1	Japan	3	3	0	257	173	+84	6	Quarterfinals
2	Iran	3	2	1	254	175	+79	5	Playoffs
3	Qatar (H)	3	1	2	224	261	−37	4	Playoffs
4	Saudi Arabia	3	0	3	170	296	−126	3	

Source: FIBA
Rules for classification: 1) Points; 2) Head-to-head results; 3) Points difference; 4) Points scored.
(H) Hosts

17 September 2023
14:30

Boxscore

Iran	62–65	Japan
Scoring by quarter: 18–27, 22–14, 15–8, 7–16
Pts: Valizadeh 17; Rebs: Jalali 10; Asts: Obeidi 4		Pts: Takata 21; Rebs: Shiratani 12; Asts: Shingo 4

Al-Gharafa Indoor Hall, Doha
Referees: Mohammed Ismail Altarawneh (JOR), Li Jin (CHN), Adel Mohamed Ghuloom (BHR)

17 September 2023
17:00

Boxscore

Qatar	91–82	Saudi Arabia
Scoring by quarter: 24–23, 21–17, 27–22, 19–20
Pts: I M Mousa 28; Rebs: Ndao 18; Asts: Ndao 6		Pts: Almatroud 24; Rebs: Toukhi 11; Asts: M Ateek 7

Al-Gharafa Indoor Hall, Doha
Referees: Lee Seungmu (KOR), Anton Kozlov (KAZ), Elie Rahji (SYR)

18 September 2023
11:30

Boxscore

Iran	106–45	Saudi Arabia
Scoring by quarter: 29–9, 37–18, 18–9, 22–9
Pts: Mohammadi 23; Rebs: Jalali 15; Asts: Edalatfar 7		Pts: M Ateek, Almatroud 13; Rebs: Khafaji, Almatroud 6 Asts: M Ateek 4

Al-Gharafa Indoor Hall, Doha
Referees: Anton Kozlov (KAZ), Lee Seungmu (KOR), Sherhon Martin (NZL)

18 September 2023
17:00

Boxscore

Japan	93–68	Qatar
Scoring by quarter: 37–15, 18–14, 25–21, 13–18
Pts: Takata 18; Rebs: Benedict 11; Asts: Nakamura 6		Pts: Ndao 32; Rebs: Ndao 15; Asts: I M Mousa

Al-Gharafa Indoor Hall, Doha
Referees: Harry Santos (PHI), Mohammed Ismail Altarawneh (JOR), Mohammed Hasan Fanharawi (IRQ)

19 September 2023
11:30

Boxscore

Saudi Arabia	43–99	Japan
Scoring by quarter: 11–28, 11–20, 8–26, 13–25
Pts: M Ateek, Alzawad 12; Rebs: Alzawad 6 Asts: Alamrad, Alzayer 3		Pts: Takata, Benedict 18; Rebs: Benedict 11; Asts: Shingo 7

Al-Gharafa Indoor Hall, Doha
Referees: Sherhon Martin (NZL), Li Jin (CHN), Harry Santos (PHI)

19 September 2023
17:00

Boxscore

Qatar	65–86	Iran
Scoring by quarter: 21–24, 10–29, 19–14, 15–19
Pts: Ndao 24; Rebs: Ndao 10; Asts: Abuissa, Ndao 4		Pts: Mohammadi 26; Rebs: Jalali 10; Asts: Mohammadi 4

Al-Gharafa Indoor Hall, Doha
Referees: Elie Rahji (SYR), Lee Seungmu (KOR), Mohammed Hasan Fanharawi (IRQ)

=== Group C ===
Pos	Team	Pld	W	L	PF	PA	PD	Pts	Qualification
1	New Zealand	3	3	0	319	169	+150	6	Quarterfinals
2	Jordan	3	2	1	192	222	−30	5	Playoffs
3	South Korea	3	1	2	229	207	+22	4	Playoffs
4	Bahrain	3	0	3	149	291	−142	3	

Source: FIBA
Rules for classification: 1) Points; 2) Head-to-head results; 3) Points difference; 4) Points scored.

17 September 2023
11:30

Boxscore

New Zealand	83–81	South Korea
Scoring by quarter: 25–24, 23–17, 18–17, 17–23
Pts: Crate, Jones 14; Rebs: Goodman 12; Asts: Goodman, Jones 4		Pts: Yang, Yoon 19; Rebs: Edi 7 Asts: Yang 6

Al-Rayyan Indoor Hall, Doha
Referees: Saif Al Dossari (QAT), Jun Horiuchi (JPN), Keyvan Mahmoodi (IRI)

17 September 2023
14:30

Boxscore

Bahrain	44–85	Jordan
Scoring by quarter: 10–23, 6–22, 16–18, 12–22
Pts: Mohsen 12; Rebs: Abdulkarim 7 Asts: Mohsen, Esam 2		Pts: Hijazi 18; Rebs: Hijazi 13; Asts: Basheer 7

Al-Rayyan Indoor Hall, Doha
Referees: Sadegh Ghanbari Damanab (IRI), Imran Ali Baig (IND), Georges Saad (LBN)

18 September 2023
11:30

Boxscore

New Zealand	119–45	Jordan
Scoring by quarter: 33–8, 30–10, 23–15, 33–12
Pts: Ball 15; Rebs: Plumtree 10; Asts: Jones 5		Pts: Ibrahem 11; Rebs: Kassem 5 Asts: Basheer 3

Al-Rayyan Indoor Hall, Doha
Referees: Sadegh Ghanbari Damanab (IRI), Jack Taylor (AUS), Abdullah Alhejaili (KSA)

18 September 2023
14:30

Boxscore

South Korea	89–62	Bahrain
Scoring by quarter: 21–20, 23–7, 22–13, 23–22
Pts: Heo, Yoon 12; Rebs: Kim M.G. 16; Asts: Edi, Kim M.J. 4		Pts: Ali, Mohsen 17; Rebs: Ali 8 Asts: Ali 4

Al-Rayyan Indoor Hall, Doha
Referees: Jun Horiuchi (JPN), Imran Ali Baig (IND), Keyvan Mahmoodi (IRI)

19 September 2023
11:30

Boxscore

Bahrain	43–117	New Zealand
Scoring by quarter: 14–27, 10–26, 7–31, 12–33
Pts: Mohsen 13; Rebs: Ali, Mohsen 4 Asts: Mohamed 2		Pts: Plumtree 22; Rebs: Cate, Crate 9 Asts: Jones 9

Al-Rayyan Indoor Hall, Doha
Referees: Rakesh Ramalingaiah (IND), Georges Saad (LBN), Keyvan Mahmoodi (IRI)

19 September 2023
14:30

Boxscore

Jordan	62–59	South Korea
Scoring by quarter: 19–21, 25–16, 4–11, 14–11
Pts: Hijazi 25; Rebs: Hijazi 12; Asts: Shaaban 6		Pts: Kim 14; Rebs: Edi 7 Asts: Edi, Yang 4

Al-Rayyan Indoor Hall, Doha
Referees: Saif Al Dossari (QAT), Jack Taylor (AUS), Razin Alaoufi (KSA)

=== Group D ===
Pos	Team	Pld	W	L	PF	PA	PD	Pts	Qualification
1	China	3	3	0	298	157	+141	6	Quarterfinals
2	Philippines	3	2	1	208	178	+30	5	Playoffs
3	Malaysia	3	1	2	164	241	−77	4	Playoffs
4	Kazakhstan	3	0	3	170	264	−94	3	

Source: FIBA
Rules for classification: 1) Points; 2) Head-to-head results; 3) Points difference; 4) Points scored.

17 September 2023
17:00

Boxscore

Malaysia	79–71	Kazakhstan
Scoring by quarter: 12–19, 37–13, 6–19, 24–20
Pts: Hoo 20; Rebs: five players 4 Asts: three players 2		Pts: Remezov 20; Rebs: Tau 14; Asts: Tau 3

Al-Rayyan Indoor Hall, Doha
Referees: Jack Taylor (AUS), Bandar Jassim M J Al Suwaidi (QAT), Razin Alaoufi (KSA)

17 September 2023
19:30

Boxscore

Philippines	67–84	China
Scoring by quarter: 24–25, 19–19, 16–24, 8–16
Pts: Alas 20; Rebs: Alas 8 Asts: Alas 3		Pts: Zhang 18; Rebs: Fu 10; Asts: Huang 4

Al-Rayyan Indoor Hall, Doha
Referees: Saif Al Dossari (QAT), Rakesh Ramalingaiah (IND), Abdullah Alhejaili (KSA)

18 September 2023
17:00

Boxscore

China	95–33	Malaysia
Scoring by quarter: 26–14, 21–6, 27–13, 21–0
Pts: Zhang 17; Rebs: Luo 8 Asts: Huang 5		Pts: Khoo 16; Rebs: Kho 6 Asts: four players 1

Al-Rayyan Indoor Hall, Doha
Referees: Saif Al Dossari (QAT), Rakesh Ramalingaiah (IND), Bandar Jassim M J Al Suwaidi (QAT)

18 September 2023
19:30

Boxscore

Philippines	66–42	Kazakhstan
Scoring by quarter: 17–16, 8–14, 22–3, 19–9
Pts: Alas 18; Rebs: Alas 10; Asts: Morales, Velasquez 3		Pts: Muratuly 15; Rebs: Remezov 11; Asts: Muratuly, Talgatov 2

Al-Rayyan Indoor Hall, Doha
Referees: Georges Saad (LBN), Sadegh Damanab Ghanbari (IRI), Razin Alaoufi (KSA)

19 September 2023
17:00

Boxscore

Kazakhstan	57–119	China
Scoring by quarter: 10–29, 21–29, 5–30, 21–31
Pts: Muratuly, Pestov 12; Rebs: three players 4 Asts: Issabayev, Muratuly 3		Pts: Zhang 24; Rebs: Huan 8 Asts: Luo 6

Al-Rayyan Indoor Hall, Doha
Referees: Imran Ali Baig (IND), Jun Horiuchi (JPN), Sadegh Damanab Ghanbari (IRI)

19 September 2023
19:30

Boxscore

Malaysia	52–75	Philippines
Scoring by quarter: 8–29, 15–16, 13–15, 16–15
Pts: three players 7 Rebs: Tan J.W. 11; Asts: three players 2		Pts: Alas 15; Rebs: Alas 13; Asts: Williams 9

Al-Rayyan Indoor Hall, Doha
Referees: Bandar Jassim M J Al Suwaidi (QAT), Abdullah Alhejaili (KSA), Keyvan Mahmoodi (IRI)

== Final round ==
=== Bracket ===
Playoffs
21 September
Jordan	70
Malaysia	64
21 September
Philippines	95
South Korea	71
21 September
India	84
Qatar	87
21 September
Iran	83
Lebanon	53

Quarter-finals
22 September
Australia	117
Jordan	50
22 September
Japan	59
Philippines	64
22 September
New Zealand	110
Qatar	33
22 September
China	62
Iran	56

Semi-finals
23 September
Australia	92
Philippines	36
23 September
New Zealand	86
China	69

Final
24 September
Australia	79
New Zealand	76
Third place
24 September
Philippines	59
China	87

Classification 5th–8th

Classification semifinals
23 September
Jordan	58
Japan	72
23 September
Qatar	56
Iran	83

Fifth place game
24 September
Japan	73
Iran	71
Seventh place game
24 September
Jordan	75
Qatar	97

=== Qualification to Quarterfinals ===
21 September 2023
11:30

Boxscore

Jordan	70–64	Malaysia
Scoring by quarter: 19–14, 20–15, 14–19, 17–16
Pts: Hijazi 16; Rebs: Shaaban 9 Asts: Basheer 5		Pts: Chua 15; Rebs: Chia 8 Asts: Tan J.W. 4

Al-Gharafa Indoor Hall, Doha
Referees: Sadegh Damanab Ghanbari (IRI), Jack Taylor (AUS), Abdullah Alhejaili (KSA)

21 September 2023
14:30

Boxscore

Iran	83–53	Lebanon
Scoring by quarter: 17–9, 20–10, 23–16, 23–18
Pts: Mohammadi 18; Rebs: Jalali 12; Asts: Obeidi 6		Pts: Iskandar 16; Rebs: Batri 6 Asts: El Boustani 5

Al-Gharafa Indoor Hall, Doha
Referees: Lee Seungmu (KOR), Adel Mohamed Ghuloom (BHR), Elie Rahji (SYR)

21 September 2023
17:00

Boxscore

India	84–87	Qatar
Scoring by quarter: 25–20, 15–32, 24–20, 20–15
Pts: L. Sharma, Lavish 23; Rebs: L. Sharma, Lavish 8 Asts: Lavish 6		Pts: I M Mousa 31; Rebs: Ndao 11; Asts: Ndao 6

Al-Gharafa Indoor Hall, Doha
Referees: Sherhon Martin (NZL), Mohammed Hasan Fanharawi (IRQ), Harry Santos (PHI)

21 September 2023
19:30

Boxscore

Philippines	95–71	South Korea
Scoring by quarter: 28–18, 32–20, 20–16, 15–17
Pts: Ludovice 25; Rebs: Alas 13; Asts: Velasquez 7		Pts: Edi 18; Rebs: Edi 12; Asts: Edi 4

Al-Gharafa Indoor Hall, Doha
Referees: Saif Al Dossari (QAT), Rakesh Ramalingaiah (IND), Georges Saad (LBN)

=== Quarterfinals ===
22 September 2023
12:30

Boxscore

Australia	117–50	Jordan
Scoring by quarter: 34–5, 26–18, 26–11, 31–16
Pts: Sewell 18; Rebs: Sewell 13; Asts: Cotton, Dickeson 6		Pts: Aljaibat, Kassem 10; Rebs: Hijazi 4 Asts: six players 1

Al-Gharafa Indoor Hall, Doha
Referees: Bandar Jassim M J Al Suwaidi (QAT), Rashid Al Musheifri (OMA), Razin Alaoufi (KSA)

22 September 2023
14:30

Boxscore

China	62–56	Iran
Scoring by quarter: 17–20, 16–12, 17–13, 12–11
Pts: Zhang 22; Rebs: Zhang 6 Asts: Huang 3		Pts: Valizadeh 12; Rebs: Jalali 12; Asts: Edalatfar, Obeidi 3

Al-Gharafa Indoor Hall, Doha
Referees: Lee Seungmu (KOR), Mohammed Ismail Altarawneh (JOR), Mohammed Hasan Fanharawi (IRQ)

22 September 2023
17:00

Boxscore

New Zealand	110–33	Qatar
Scoring by quarter: 30–14, 29–5, 23–7, 28–7
Pts: Goodman 23; Rebs: Plumtree 17; Asts: Teratana 5		Pts: Ndao 16; Rebs: Ndao 11; Asts: Amah 4

Al-Gharafa Indoor Hall, Doha
Referees: Jun Horiuchi (JPN), Georges Saad (LBN), Jack Taylor (AUS)

22 September 2023
19:30

Boxscore

Japan	59–64	Philippines
Scoring by quarter: 16–16, 19–9, 10–21, 14–18
Pts: Takata 12; Rebs: Benedict, Shiratani 14; Asts: Nakamura 4		Pts: Alas 29; Rebs: Alas 9 Asts: Alas 3

Al-Gharafa Indoor Hall, Doha
Referees: Saif Al Dossari (QAT), Sadegh Damanab Ghanbari (IRI), Anton Kozlov (KAZ)

=== 5th–8th place semifinals ===
23 September 2023
11:30

Boxscore

Qatar	56–83	Iran
Scoring by quarter: 9–27, 13–17, 18–19, 16–20
Pts: Ndao 23; Rebs: Ndao 15; Asts: I M Mousa, Ndao 2		Pts: Khosroshahi 25; Rebs: GharaPazokiKheil 8 Asts: Mohammadi 6

Al-Gharafa Indoor Hall, Doha
Referees: Sherhon Martin (NZL), Harry Santos (PHI), Li Jin (CHN)

23 September 2023
14:30

Boxscore

Jordan	58–72	Japan
Scoring by quarter: 11–20, 8–18, 18–22, 21–12
Pts: Hijazi 21; Rebs: Aljaibat, Ghazal 7 Asts: Shaaban 3		Pts: Sembo 12; Rebs: Wakano 7 Asts: Wakano, Takata 6

Al-Gharafa Indoor Hall, Doha
Referees: Imran Ali Baig (IND), Abdullah Alhejaili (KSA), Keyvan Mahmoodi (IRI)

=== Semifinals ===
23 September 2023
17:00

Boxscore

New Zealand	86–69	China
Scoring by quarter: 24–15, 22–14, 22–21, 18–19
Pts: Crate 23; Rebs: Jones 9 Asts: Teratana 4		Pts: Huan 11; Rebs: Huan 7 Asts: six players 2

Al-Gharafa Indoor Hall, Doha
Referees: Saif Al Dossari (QAT), Lee Seungmu (KOR), Sadegh Damanab Ghanbari (IRI),

23 September 2023
19:30

Boxscore

Australia	92–36	Philippines
Scoring by quarter: 22–7, 23–3, 26–10, 21–16
Pts: Daniels 12; Rebs: Daniels 11; Asts: Sewell 4		Pts: Amos, Chua 6 Rebs: Daja 4 Asts: Ludovice 2

Al-Gharafa Indoor Hall, Doha
Referees: Mohammed Hasan Fanharawi (IRQ), Rakesh Ramalingaiah (IND), Adel Mohamed Ghuloom (BHR)

=== Seventh place game ===
24 September 2023
11:30

Boxscore

Jordan	75–97	Qatar
Scoring by quarter: 19–22, 21–26, 19–26, 16–23
Pts: Hijazi 20; Rebs: Hijazi 13; Asts: Fanous, Hijazi 5		Pts: Ndao 33; Rebs: Ndao 11; Asts: I M Mousa 8

Al-Gharafa Indoor Hall, Doha
Referees: Jun Horiuchi (JPN), Elie Rahji (SYR), Sherhon Martin (NZL)

=== Fifth place game ===
24 September 2023
14:30

Boxscore

Japan	73–71	Iran
Scoring by quarter: 21–22, 16–17, 18–11, 18–21
Pts: Sembo 24; Rebs: Benedict 8 Asts: Nakamura 6		Pts: Valizadeh 24; Rebs: Dadvand, Mohammadi 8 Asts: Edalatfar 3

Al-Gharafa Indoor Hall, Doha
Referees: Mohammed Ismail Altarawneh (JOR), Georges Saad (LBN), Adel Mohamed Ghuloom (BHR)

=== Third place game ===
24 September 2023
17:00

Boxscore

Philippines	59–87	China
Scoring by quarter: 17–20, 12–24, 8–26, 22–17
Pts: Ludovice 15; Rebs: Alas 5 Asts: Ludovice, Williams 3		Pts: Zhang 34; Rebs: Huan 11; Asts: He 7

Al-Gharafa Indoor Hall, Doha
Referees: Sadegh Damanab Ghanbari (IRI), Jack Taylor (AUS), Abdullah Alhejaili (KSA)

=== Final ===
24 September 2023
19:30

Boxscore

Australia	79–76	New Zealand
Scoring by quarter: 18–18, 20–23, 24–21, 17–14
Pts: Daniels 17; Rebs: Cheesman, Daniels 6 Asts: Daniels 5		Pts: Jones 31; Rebs: Goodman 13; Asts: Crate 3

Al-Gharafa Indoor Hall, Doha
Referees: Saif Al Dossari (QAT), Lee Seungmu (KOR), Mohammed Hasan Fanharawi (IRQ)

== Final standings ==
Rank	Team	Record
1st place, gold medalist(s)	Australia	6–0
2nd place, silver medalist(s)	New Zealand	5–1
3rd place, bronze medalist(s)	China	5–1
4	Philippines	4–3
5	Japan	5–1
6	Iran	4–3
7	Qatar	3–4
8	Jordan	3–4
9	India	2–2
10	South Korea	1–3
11	Lebanon	1–3
12	Malaysia	1–3
13	Kazakhstan	0–3
14	Saudi Arabia	0–3
15	Bahrain	0–3
16	Sri Lanka	0–3

Qualified for the 2024 FIBA Under-17 Basketball World Cup

== Awards ==
2023 Asian Under-16 champions

Australia
Third title

=== All-Tournament Team ===
- C (Australia) Henry Sewell
- F (New Zealand) Oscar Goodman (MVP)
- F (New Zealand) Lachlan Crate
- G (China) Zhang Boyuan
- G (Philippines) Kiefer Alas
