= Iran men's national under-16 basketball team =

Iran
- Joined FIBA: 1947
- FIBA zone: FIBA Asia
- National federation: I.R.I.B.F.

U17 World Cup
- Appearances: None

U16 Asia Cup
- Appearances: 6
- Medals: (bronze) Bronze: 1 (2009)
Home	Away
Medal record
Asia Cup
Bronze medal – third place	2009 Johor Bahru	Team

The Iran men's national under-16 basketball team is a national basketball team of Iran, administered by the Islamic Republic of Iran Basketball Federation. It represents the country in international under-16 men's basketball competitions.

== Results ==
=== FIBA Under-16 Asia Cup ===
Champions Runners-up 3rd place 4th place

Year	Rank	Pld.	W	L
2009	3rd	8	7	1
2011	Withdrawn (Note: The team was forced to withdraw from the tournament due to visa issues)			
2013	6th	9	4	5
2015	Did not participate			
2017	7th (Note: Best scoring team)	5	3	2
2022	8th	5	2	3
2023	6th	7	4	3
2025	6th	7	4	3
Total	6/8	41	24	17

== Roster ==
According to the 2022 FIBA U16 Asian Championship:

- Moeinreza Kazemizadeh
- Yasin Samiei
- Mohammad Amini
- Mehrab Alam Beygi
- Sadra Rezaee Gilkalayeh
- Mojtaba Yaghoubi
- Sarem Jafari
- Seyed Amirali Mirjalali
- Mohammad Amin Khosravi
- Mohammad Mahdi Heydari
- Iman Dalirzahan
- Amirhosein Parand

== See also ==
- Iran men's national basketball team
- Iran men's national under-19 basketball team
- Iran women's national under-16 basketball team
