= South Korea men's national under-17 basketball team =

South Korea
- FIBA ranking: 31 ▲1 (December 2024)
- Joined FIBA: 1955
- FIBA zone: FIBA Asia
- National federation: Korea Basketball Association
- Coach: Kim Do-wan

U17 World Cup
- Appearances: 3
- Medals: None

U16 Asia Cup
- Appearances: 8
- Medals: (gold) Gold: 1 (2015); (silver) Silver: 2 (2009, 2011)
Home	Away

The South Korea men's national under-16 and under-17 basketball team is a national basketball team of South Korea, administered by the Korea Basketball Association. It represents the country in international under-16 and under-17 men's basketball competitions.

== FIBA U16 Asia Cup participations ==
Year	Result
2009	2nd place, silver medalist(s)
2011	2nd place, silver medalist(s)
2013	5th
2015	1st place, gold medalist(s)
2017	5th
2022	6th
2023	10th
2025	5th

== FIBA U17 World Cup record ==
Year	Pos.	Pld	W	L
(Germany) 2010	12th	7	0	7
(Lithuania) 2012	11th	7	1	6
(United Arab Emirates) 2014	Did not qualify			
(Spain) 2016	8th	7	3	4
(Argentina) 2018	Did not qualify			
(Spain) 2022	Did not qualify			
(Turkey) 2024	Did not qualify			
(Turkey) 2026	Did not qualify			
(Greece) 2028	To be determined			
Total	3/9	21	4	17

== See also ==
- South Korea men's national basketball team
- South Korea men's national under-19 basketball team
- South Korea women's national under-17 basketball team
