= Chinese Taipei men's national under-17 basketball team =

Chinese Taipei
- FIBA zone: FIBA Asia
- National federation: Chinese Taipei Basketball Association

U17 World Cup
- Appearances: 1 (2016)
- Medals: None

U16 Asia Cup
- Appearances: 6
- Medals: (silver) Silver: 1 (2015)

The Chinese Taipei men's national under-16 and under-17 basketball team is a national basketball team of Chinese Taipei (Taiwan), administered by the Chinese Taipei Basketball Association. It represents the country in international under-16 and under-17 men's basketball competitions.

== FIBA U16 Asia Cup participations ==
Year	Result
2009	5th
2011	9th
2013	4th
2015	2nd place, silver medalist(s)
2017	9th
2022	Did not participate
2023	Did not participate
2025	7th

== FIBA U17 World Cup record ==
Year	Pos.	Pld	W	L
(Germany) 2010	Did not qualify			
(Lithuania) 2012	Did not qualify			
(United Arab Emirates) 2014	Did not qualify			
(Spain) 2016	14th	7	1	6
(Argentina) 2018	Did not qualify			
(Spain) 2022	Did not participate			
(Turkey) 2024	Did not participate			
(Turkey) 2026	Did not qualify			
(Greece) 2028	To be determined			
Total	1/9	7	1	6

== See also ==
- Chinese Taipei men's national basketball team
- Chinese Taipei men's national under-19 basketball team
- Chinese Taipei women's national under-17 basketball team
