= Japan men's national under-17 basketball team =

Japan
- FIBA zone: FIBA Asia
- National federation: Japan Basketball Association
- Coach: Sota Katamine

U17 World Cup
- Appearances: 3

U16 Asia Cup
- Appearances: 8
- Medals: (silver) Silver: (2022); (bronze) Bronze: (2011, 2013)
Home	Away

The Japan men's national under-16 and under-17 basketball team is a national basketball team of Japan, administered by the Japan Basketball Association. It represents the country in international under-16 and under-17 men's basketball competitions.

A prominent member had been Rui Hachimura.

== Tournament record ==
=== FIBA U17 World Cup ===
Year	Pos.	Pld	W	L
(Germany) 2010	Did not qualify			
(Lithuania) 2012	Did not qualify			
(United Arab Emirates) 2014	14th	7	1	6
(Spain) 2016	Did not qualify			
(Argentina) 2018	Did not qualify			
(Spain) 2022	14th	7	1	6
(Turkey) 2024	Did not qualify			
(Turkey) 2026	14th	7	1	6
(Greece) 2028	To be determined			
Total	3/9	21	3	18

=== FIBA U16 Asia Cup ===
Year	Result
2009	6th
2011	3rd place, bronze medalist(s)
2013	3rd place, bronze medalist(s)
2015	4th
2017	6th
2022	2nd place, silver medalist(s)
2023	5th
2025	4th

== Head coaches ==
- (Japan) Takashi Ideguchi – 2013–2014
- (Germany) Torsten Loibl – 2015–present

== See also ==
- Japan men's national basketball team
- Japan men's national under-19 basketball team
- Japan women's national under-17 basketball team
