= Saudi Arabia men's national under-16 basketball team =

Saudi Arabia
- FIBA zone: FIBA Asia
- National federation: Saudi Arabian Basketball Federation

U17 World Cup
- Appearances: None

U16 Asia Cup
- Appearances: 4
- Medals: None

The Saudi Arabia men's national under-16 basketball team is a national basketball team of Saudi Arabia, administered by the Saudi Arabian Basketball Federation. It represents the country in international under-16 men's basketball competitions.

== FIBA U16 Asia Cup participations ==
Year	Result
2009	15th
2011	8th
2023	14th
2025	14th

== See also ==
- Saudi Arabia men's national basketball team
- Saudi Arabia men's national under-18 basketball team
- Saudi Arabia men's national 3x3 team
