= Saudi Women's Basketball League =

- Organising body: Saudi Arabian Basketball Federation (SBF)
- Founded: 2021; 5 years ago
- First season: 2020–21
- Country: Saudi Arabia
- Confederation: FIBA Asia
- Current champions: Al Qadsiah SC (1st title) (2025–26)
- Most championships: Multiple clubs (1 title)
- Saudi Arabian Basketball Federation

The Saudi Women's Basketball League ( Arabic : الدوري السعودي لكرة السلة للسيدات ) is a women's basketball competition in Saudi Arabia organized by the Saudi Arabian Basketball Federation (SBF).

The women's basketball competition was established in the early 2020s as part of the development of women's basketball in Saudi Arabia. The inaugural edition was won by Al-Azm, while the second edition was won by Armed Eagles.

The second edition featured 15 teams from Riyadh, Jeddah and Dammam, with 10 teams advancing to the final stage. Armed Eagles defeated Titanium 33–32 in the final.

The competition was subsequently developed into a national league involving established Saudi sports clubs and private academies. The modern national league's 2023 season was won by Al-Asimah.

For the 2023–24 season, the Saudi Arabian Basketball Federation announced an eight-team competition using a home-and-away format. Al-Hilal won the championship, defeating Al-Ahli 70–64 in the final stage.

== History ==
=== Establishment and early competitions ===
Women's basketball developed in Saudi Arabia through private teams, academies and regional competitions before the establishment of a regular national league structure.

The first edition of the women's basketball competition was won by Al-Azm. The second edition was won by Armed Eagles, who defeated Titanium 33–32 in the final.

The second edition included 15 teams from Riyadh, Jeddah and Dammam. Ten teams advanced to the final stage of the competition.

=== National league era ===
The competition was subsequently reorganized into a national league involving Saudi clubs and academies. The 2023 competition included teams from Riyadh and Jeddah, including Al-Asimah, Al-Nassr, Al-Hilal, Jeddah United, Al-Ittihad and Al-Ahli.

Al-Asimah won the 2023 national championship.

For the 2023–24 season, the Saudi Arabian Basketball Federation announced an eight-team national competition using a home-and-away format.

The participating teams were Al-Asimah, Al-Nassr, Al-Ahli, Jeddah United, Al-Qadsiah, Al-Hilal, Al-Ittihad and Al-Ula.

Al-Hilal won the 2023–24 championship. The club finished the season unbeaten with 13 victories, while Al-Ahli finished second and Al-Ula third.

The 2024–25 Saudi Women's Basketball League was the fifth edition of the Saudi women's basketball league. The season began in November 2024 with six participating teams: Al-Nassr FC, Al-Ahli, Al-Ittihad, Al-Qadsiah, Al-Ula, and Al-Okhdood.

Al-Nassr FC went on to win the championship, securing the title on 18 January 2025 after defeating Al-Ittihad 57–55 in the final round. Al-Nassr finished the competition with 18 points, while Al-Ittihad were among the leading challengers. The six-team field consisted of Al-Nassr, Al-Ahli, Al-Ittihad, Al-Qadsiah, Al-Ula and Al-Okhdood.

The 2025–26 Saudi Women's Basketball League was contested through a preliminary stage followed by a second stage. Al-Qadsiah topped Group A, which also included Al-Fateh and Gym Master, while Al-Ula topped Group B, which included Jeddah United, Jeddah Sports Club, Jeddah Athletes and Sawt Al-Shabaka. Both Al-Qadsiah and Al-Ula remained unbeaten during the preliminary and second stages and advanced to the championship final.

In the final, Al-Qadsiah defeated Al-Ula 66–60 to win the championship. Al-Qadsiah finished first with 10 points and received the gold medals, while Al-Ula finished second with 9 points and received the silver medals. Jeddah United finished third with 8 points, followed by Jeddah Athletes in fourth with 7 points, Gym Master in fifth with 6 points and Jeddah Sports Club in sixth with 5 points. Al-Qadsiah 66–60 Al-Ula

== Competition format ==
The competition has used different formats during its early development.

The first two editions involved regional qualification and final-stage tournaments. The second edition featured 15 teams from three regions, with 10 teams advancing to the final stage.

Beginning with the reorganized national league, the competition adopted a more conventional league structure. For the 2023–24 season, eight teams competed in a home-and-away format.

The team finishing eighth was scheduled for relegation to the regional league, while the regional champion was scheduled for promotion to the national league.

== Champions ==
| Season | Edition | Champions | Runners-up | Final score |
|---|---|---|---|---|
| 2021 | 1st | Al-Azm | Armed Eagles | |
| 2022 | 2nd | Armed Eagles | Titanium WBC | 33–32 |
| 2023 | 3rd | Al-Asimah | Jeddah United | |
| 2023–24 | 4th | Al-Hilal | Al-Ahli | 70–64 |
| 2024–25 | 5th | Al-Nassr | Al-Ahli | |
| 2025–26 | 6th | Al Qadsiah SC | Al-Ula Club | |

== Performance by club ==
| Rk. | Club | Titles | Seasons |
|---|---|---|---|
| 1 | Al-Azm | 1 | 2021 |
| = | Armed Eagles | 1 | 2022 |
| = | Al-Asimah | 1 | 2023 |
| = | Al-Hilal | 1 | 2023–24 |
| = | Al-Nassr | 1 | 2024–25 |
| = | Al Qadsiah SC | 1 | 2025–26 |

== See also ==
- Saudi Arabian Basketball Federation
- Saudi Basketball League
- Saudi Arabia women's national basketball team
