= Bangladesh men's national under-17 basketball team =

Bangladesh
- FIBA zone: FIBA Asia
- National federation: Bangladesh Basketball Federation
- Coach: Md Faisal Kareem
- Nickname: Junior Tigers

U17 World Cup
- Appearances: No Appearances

U16 Asia Cup
- Appearances: 1
Home	Away

The Bangladesh men's national under-16 and under-17 basketball team represents the country in junior men's under-16 and under-17 FIBA tournaments and is governed by the Bangladesh Basketball Federation.

== Competitions records ==
=== FIBA U-17 World Cup ===
FIBA Under-17 Basketball World Cup records
Hosts	Result	Position	GP	Won	Lost
(Germany) 2010	Did not qualify				
(Lithuania) 2012	Did not qualify				
(United Arab Emirates) 2014	Did not qualify				
(Spain) 2016	Did not qualify				
(Argentina) 2018	Did not qualify				
(Bulgaria) 2020	Cancelled due to the COVID-19 pandemic				
(Spain) 2022	Did not qualify				
(Turkey) 2024	Did not qualify				
(Turkey) 2026	Did not qualify				
Total	0/8	0 Title	0	0	0

=== FIBA U-16 Asia Cup ===
FIBA Under-16 Asia Cup records
Hosts	Result	Position	GP	Won	Lost
(Malaysia) 2009	Did not participate				
(Vietnam) 2011	Did not participate				
(Iran) 2013	Did not participate				
(Indonesia) 2015	Group stage	15/15	4	0	0
(China) 2017	Did not participate				
(Qatar) 2022	Did not participate				
(Qatar) 2023	Did not participate				
(Mongolia) 2025	Did not participate				
Total	1/8	0 Title	4	0	4
