= Samira Asghari =

Afghan basketballer

Samira Asghari (Persian: سمیرا اصغری; born 31 March 1994) is a member of the International Olympic Committee for Afghanistan since 2018. Upon her election at the age of 24, Asghari became the first representative from Afghanistan and one of the youngest ever members to join the IOC. Before being selected for the IOC, Asghari played for the Afghanistan women's national basketball team and worked for the Afghanistan National Olympic Committee during the 2010s. With the ANOC, Asghari briefly held the finance director and Deputy Secretary General positions in the early to mid 2010s.

== Early life and education ==
On 31 March 1994, Asghari was born in the Jalrez District, Afghanistan. Shortly after her birth, Asghari and her family became war refugees and moved to Iran. Growing up, Asghari played association football and basketball while attending school. For her post-secondary education, Asghari went to Kateb University for a Bachelor of Arts in international relations.

== Career ==
During the 2010s, Asghari joined the Afghanistan women's national basketball team and was named captain of the Afghan basketball team. Outside of basketball, Asghari worked for an Afghan agency in women's sports before starting her Olympic career with the Afghanistan National Olympic Committee. With the NOC, Asghari first held positions in women's sports and international relations. As an executive for the NOC, Asghari held one year positions as finance director and Deputy Secretary General during the early to mid 2010s. During this time period, Asghari joined committees for the Olympic Council of Asia and International Olympic Committee in 2014.

In 2018, Asghari became the first elected member of the International Olympic Committee from Afghanistan. Her election made Asghari one of the youngest ever members of the IOC when she joined at age 24. As part of the committee, Asghari was selected to join a commission for future winter Olympics in 2019.

Following the Taliban takeover of Afghanistan, it was confirmed that Asghari was living in Europe. Fearful for the safety of her fellow Afghan female athletes, she called on the United States to help them evacuate the country.

== Awards and honors ==
In 2019, the Afghanistan Sports Journalists Federation presented Asghari with the Sports Personality of the Year award.
