= North Korea men's national under-16 basketball team =

North Korea
- FIBA zone: FIBA Asia

World Championships
- Appearances: None

Asia Championships
- Appearances: None

The North Korea national under-16 basketball team is a national basketball team of North Korea, administered by the Amateur Basketball Association of DPR of Korea. It represents the country in international under-16 (under age 16) basketball competitions.

It appeared at the 2015 FIBA Asia Under-16 Championship qualification stage.

== See also ==
- North Korea men's national basketball team
