= Iraq men's national under-16 basketball team =

Iraq
- FIBA zone: FIBA Asia
- National federation: Iraqi Basketball Association

U17 World Cup
- Appearances: None

U16 Asia Cup
- Appearances: 2 (2011, 2015)
- Medals: None

The Iraq men's national under-16 basketball team is a national basketball team of Iraq, administered by the Iraqi Basketball Association. It represents the country in men's international under-16 basketball competitions.

== FIBA U16 Asia Cup participations ==
Year	Result
2011	5th
2015	9th

== See also ==
- Iraq men's national basketball team
- Iraq men's national under-18 basketball team
