= 2015 FIBA Asia Under-16 Championship =

International men's youth basketball championship

Tournament details
- Host country: Indonesia
- City: Jakarta
- Dates: 29 October – 7 November
- Teams: 15
- Venues: 2 (in 1 host city)

Final positions
- Champions: South Korea (1st title)
- Runners-up: Chinese Taipei
- Third place: China
- Fourth place: Japan

Tournament statistics
- Top scorer: (Iraq) Abdullah Abdullah (24.3 points per game)

Official website
- www.fiba.basketball/history

The 2015 FIBA Asia Under-16 Championship was the qualifying tournament for FIBA Asia at the 2016 FIBA Under-17 World Championship. The tournament was supposed to be held in Bangalore, India from July 2 to 12, but according to FIBA's official tournament website, it was rescheduled to October 29 to November 7, in Jakarta, Indonesia.

South Korea defeated Chinese Taipei in the Finals, 78–69 to capture their first FIBA Asia Under-16 Championship after finishing second in the first two installments of the competition. Three-time defending champions China on the other hand managed to capture bronze against Japan, 80–58. The top three teams will represent FIBA Asia in the 2016 FIBA Under-17 World Championship in Spain.

== Qualification ==
=== Allocation of berths ===
According to FIBA Asia rules, the number of participating teams in the FIBA Asia Under-16 Championship was set at 16. The hosts and the defending champions qualified automatically. All FIBA Asia subzones got two berths each, except for the Central and South Asian subzones, which got one berth each. The last four berths were allocated to subzones based on their teams' results in the 2013 FIBA Asia Under-16 Championship.

Allocation of berths
| Subzone | Automatic qualifiers | | Default berths | Additional berths as 2nd–5th place teams from last championship | Total |
| Subzone | Hosts | Defending champions | Default berths | Additional berths as 2nd–5th place teams from last championship | Total |
|---|---|---|---|---|---|
| Central Asia | 0 | 0 | 1 | 0 | 1 |
| East Asia | 0 | 1 | 2 | 3 | 6 |
| Gulf | 0 | 0 | 2 | 0 | 2 |
| South Asia | 0 | 0 | 1 | 0 | 1 |
| Southeast Asia | 1 | 0 | 2 | 1 | 4 |
| West Asia | 0 | 0 | 2 | 0 | 2 |
| Total | 1 | 1 | 10 | 4 | 16 |

=== Qualified teams ===
- Central Asia (1):
  - N/A^{[Note 1]}
- East Asia (6):
  - China (defending champions)
  - Chinese Taipei
  - ~~North Korea~~^{[Note 2]}
  - Hong Kong
  - Japan
  - South Korea
- Gulf (2):
  - Bahrain
  - Kuwait
- South Asia (1):
  - Bangladesh
- Southeast Asia (4):
  - Indonesia (hosts)
  - Philippines
  - Malaysia
  - Thailand
- West Asia (2):
  - Iraq
  - Lebanon

^{Note 1} The Central Asian qualification was cancelled. India from the South Asian subzone was selected to take the Central Asian place, thus completing the 16-team field.
^{Note 2} North Korea reportedly withdrew a day before the beginning of the tournament, bringing down the number of participating teams to 15.

== Draw ==
The draw took place on 8 October 2015 in Jakarta, Indonesia.

| Group A | Group B | Group C | Group D |
|---|---|---|---|
| Japan; Kuwait; Hong Kong; Malaysia | Chinese Taipei; Bangladesh; Indonesia; Lebanon | Philippines; Bahrain; ~~North Korea~~*; Thailand | China; India; South Korea; Iraq |

* Withdrew.

== Preliminary round ==
All times are local (UTC+7).

=== Group A ===
| Pos | Team | Pld | W | L | PF | PA | PD | Pts | Qualification |
|---|---|---|---|---|---|---|---|---|---|
| 1 | Japan | 3 | 3 | 0 | 247 | 139 | +108 | 6 | Advanced to second round |
| 2 | Kuwait | 3 | 1 | 2 | 189 | 221 | −32 | 4 (Note: 1−1, 1.029 (beaten Malaysia, lost to Hong Kong)) | Advanced to second round |
| 3 | Malaysia | 3 | 1 | 2 | 174 | 211 | −37 | 4 (Note: 1−1, 1.007 (beaten Hong Kong, lost to Kuwait)) | Advanced to second round |
| 4 | Hong Kong | 3 | 1 | 2 | 175 | 214 | −39 | 4 (Note: 1−1, 0.969 (beaten Kuwait, lost to Malaysia)) | Proceeded to classification round |

Source: FIBA
Rules for classification: 1) Points; 2) Head-to-head results; 3) Points difference; 4) Points scored; 5) Drawing of lots.
Notes:

29 October 2015
10:00

Boxscore

| Japan | 84–49 | Kuwait |
Scoring by quarter: 17–18, 28–9, 23–14, 16–8
| Pts: Nishida 20; Rebs: Mimori 9 Asts: Ito 8 | | Pts: Aloutaibi 20; Rebs: Husain 12; Asts: Husain 3 |

BritAma Arena, Jakarta
Referees: Wang Mei (CHN), Joenard Garcia (PHI), Kim Jong-Kuk (KOR)

29 October 2015
14:00

Boxscore

| Malaysia | 69–53 | Hong Kong |
Scoring by quarter: 21–13, 23–15, 16–9, 9–16
| Pts: K. Lim 13; Rebs: Lim J.Y., Yap Z.W. 9 Asts: Lee J.K., K. Lim 3 | | Pts: Lin M.C. 19; Rebs: Yip Y.P. 16; Asts: Lau T.W. 2 |

GOR Pulogadung, Jakarta
Referees: Ahmed Al Bulushi (OMA), Lee Kyoung-Hwan (KOR), Suebpong Wichaiphin (THA)

30 October 2015
12:00

Boxscore

| Japan | 77–39 | Malaysia |
Scoring by quarter: 23–4, 16–8, 15–17, 23–10
| Pts: Nishida 23; Rebs: Mimori 11; Asts: Takahara, Tsuchiya 6 | | Pts: Suresh Mahadevan 16; Rebs: Yap Z.W. 6 Asts: Lee J.K. 3 |

BritAma Arena, Jakarta
Referees: Hatim Alharbi (KSA), Mohamed Hasan Alsalam (BRN), Lee Kyoung-Hwan (KOR)

30 October 2015
14:00

Boxscore

| Kuwait | 59–71 | Hong Kong |
Scoring by quarter: 9–15, 13–17, 15–20, 22–19
| Pts: Aloutaibi 26; Rebs: Husain 14; Asts: Husain 4 | | Pts: Lin M.C. 28; Rebs: Li Y.F. 15; Asts: Lau T.W. 5 |

GOR Pulogadung, Jakarta
Referees: Wang Mei (CHN), Yuji Higashi (JPN), Suebpong Wichaiphin (THA)

31 October 2015
14:00

Boxscore

| Hong Kong | 51–86 | Japan |
Scoring by quarter: 13–18, 16–17, 13–21, 9–30
| Pts: Lin M.C., Yip Y.P. 14; Rebs: Li Y.F. 10; Asts: Lin M.C. 2 | | Pts: Nishida 23; Rebs: Nishida 9 Asts: Ito 7 |

BritAma Arena, Jakarta
Referees: Walid Marcel Abirached (LIB), Wahran Al Hasnawi (IRQ), Suebpong Wichaiphin (THA)

31 October 2015
16:00

Boxscore

| Malaysia | 66–81 | Kuwait |
Scoring by quarter: 14–24, 20–22, 9–17, 23–18
| Pts: Low K.Y. 20; Rebs: Ooi L.C. 10; Asts: 5 players 2 | | Pts: Husain 26; Rebs: Husain 14; Asts: Aloutaibi 6 |

BritAma Arena, Jakarta
Referees: Yan Jun (CHN), Kim Jong-Kuk (KOR), Budi Marfan (INA)

=== Group B ===
| Pos | Team | Pld | W | L | PF | PA | PD | Pts | Qualification |
|---|---|---|---|---|---|---|---|---|---|
| 1 | Chinese Taipei | 3 | 3 | 0 | 318 | 173 | +145 | 6 | Advanced to second round |
| 2 | Lebanon | 3 | 2 | 1 | 189 | 149 | +40 | 5 | Advanced to second round |
| 3 | Indonesia (H) | 3 | 1 | 2 | 201 | 191 | +10 | 4 | Advanced to second round |
| 4 | Bangladesh | 3 | 0 | 3 | 60 | 255 | −195 | 2 | Proceeded to classification round |

Source: FIBA
Rules for classification: 1) Points; 2) Head-to-head results; 3) Points difference; 4) Points scored; 5) Drawing of lots.
(H) Hosts

29 October 2015
16:00

Boxscore

| Chinese Taipei | 145–31 | Bangladesh |
Scoring by quarter: 32–2, 42–7, 38–16, 33–6
| Pts: Tang W.C. 27; Rebs: Chen F. 16; Asts: Hsieh W.Y. 8 | | Pts: Rahman 12; Rebs: Prodhan 10; Asts: Biswas, Rusho, Haque 1 |

GOR Pulogadung, Jakarta
Referees: Hatim Alharbi (KSA), Wahran Al Hasnawi (IRQ), Kim Jong-Kuk (KOR)

29 October 2015
18:00

Boxscore

| Lebanon | 83–55 | Indonesia |
Scoring by quarter: 25–12, 18–15, 23–17, 17–11
| Pts: Alaaeddine 16; Rebs: Zeinoun 14; Asts: Captan 5 | | Pts: Wijaya, Sada, Agviandi 8 Rebs: Rizqiano 7 Asts: Rizqiano, Noor 3 |

BritAma Arena, Jakarta
Referees: Snehal Bendke (IND), Mohamed Hasan Alsalam (BRN), Yan Jun (CHN)

30 October 2015
10:00

Boxscore

| Chinese Taipei | 94–86 | Lebanon |
Scoring by quarter: 34–16, 20–29, 23–20, 17–21
| Pts: Lin T.C. 27; Rebs: Tang W.C. 10; Asts: Chen Y.W. 9 | | Pts: Alaaeddine 30; Rebs: Saad 10; Asts: Captan 5 |

BritAma Arena, Jakarta
Referees: Snehal Bendke (IND), Wahran Al Hasnawi (IRQ), Joenard Garcia (PHI)

30 October 2015
18:00

Boxscore

| Bangladesh | 29–90 | Indonesia |
Scoring by quarter: 4–26, 4–16, 11–22, 10–26
| Pts: Prodhan 12; Rebs: Rusho 11; Asts: Rahman 3 | | Pts: Noor 14; Rebs: Saputro, Agviandi 7 Asts: Maulana 10 |

BritAma Arena, Jakarta
Referees: Kim Jong-Kuk (KOR), Chan Ho Ming (HKG), Yan Jun (CHN)

31 October 2015
14:00

Boxscore

| Lebanon | 20–0 | Bangladesh |
Walkover

GOR Pulogadung, Jakarta
Referees: Mohamed Hasan Alsalam (BRN), Chan Ho Ming (HKG), Haryanto Sutaryo (INA)

31 October 2015
18:00

Boxscore

| Indonesia | 56–79 | Chinese Taipei |
Scoring by quarter: 19–20, 12–15, 14–21, 11–23
| Pts: Rachman 12; Rebs: Rizqiano, Rachman 5 Asts: Ray 5 | | Pts: Lin T.C. 33; Rebs: Lin T.C. 12; Asts: Chen Y.W. 7 |

BritAma Arena, Jakarta
Referees: Lee Kyoung-Hwan (KOR), Sabuj Md. Miha (BAN), Georges Saad (LIB)

=== Group C ===
| Pos | Team | Pld | W | L | PF | PA | PD | Pts | Qualification |
|---|---|---|---|---|---|---|---|---|---|
| 1 | Philippines | 2 | 2 | 0 | 168 | 109 | +59 | 4 | Advanced to second round |
| 2 | Thailand | 2 | 1 | 1 | 116 | 128 | −12 | 3 | Advanced to second round |
| 3 | Bahrain | 2 | 0 | 2 | 116 | 163 | −47 | 2 | Advanced to second round |

Source: FIBA
Rules for classification: 1) Points; 2) Head-to-head results; 3) Points difference; 4) Points scored; 5) Drawing of lots.

29 October 2015
12:00

Boxscore

| Philippines | 98–58 | Bahrain |
Scoring by quarter: 22–13, 33–13, 24–14, 19–18
| Pts: Ildefonso 16; Rebs: Gozum 9 Asts: Belangel 6 | | Pts: Abdulhusain 21; Rebs: Almajed 6 Asts: Salman 4 |

BritAma Arena, Jakarta
Referees: Yuji Higashi (JPN), Herman (INA), Lan Wei-hsiung (TPE)

30 October 2015
16:00

Boxscore

| Philippines | 70–51 | Thailand |
Scoring by quarter: 14–12, 16–15, 28–9, 12–15
| Pts: Pagsanjan, Belangel 10; Rebs: Gozum 10; Asts: Mamuyac 5 | | Pts: Limjittakorn 11; Rebs: Limjittakorn 11; Asts: Jaimsawad 4 |

BritAma Arena, Jakarta
Referees: Mohammed Alamiri (KUW), Lan Wei-hsiung (TPE), Sabuj Md. Miha (BAN)

31 October 2015
16:00

Boxscore

| Thailand | 65–58 | Bahrain |
Scoring by quarter: 21–7, 14–19, 14–12, 16–20
| Pts: Banchathon 28; Rebs: Sonsem 7 Asts: Jaimsawad 11 | | Pts: Almajed 13; Rebs: Aboukuora 14; Asts: B. Ali 3 |

GOR Pulogadung, Jakarta
Referees: Snehal Bendke (IND), Yuji Higashi (JPN), Lan Wei-hsiung (TPE)

=== Group D ===
| Pos | Team | Pld | W | L | PF | PA | PD | Pts | Qualification |
|---|---|---|---|---|---|---|---|---|---|
| 1 | China | 3 | 3 | 0 | 274 | 178 | +96 | 6 | Advanced to second round |
| 2 | South Korea | 3 | 2 | 1 | 261 | 250 | +11 | 5 | Advanced to second round |
| 3 | Iraq | 3 | 1 | 2 | 220 | 228 | −8 | 4 | Advanced to second round |
| 4 | India | 3 | 0 | 3 | 211 | 310 | −99 | 3 | Proceeded to classification round |

Source: FIBA
Rules for classification: 1) Points; 2) Head-to-head results; 3) Points difference; 4) Points scored; 5) Drawing of lots.

29 October 2015
14:00

Boxscore

| China | 116–57 | India |
Scoring by quarter: 33–21, 33–12, 27–12, 23–12
| Pts: Huang R.Q. 22; Rebs: Li X.B. 9 Asts: Bai H.T. 8 | | Pts: Poiyamozhi 18; Rebs: Tomar 5 Asts: Hansraj 4 |

BritAma Arena, Jakarta
Referees: Mohammad Alamiri (KUW), Shigeyuki Arisawa (JPN), Budi Marfan (INA)

29 October 2015
16:00

Boxscore

| Iraq | 74–92 | South Korea |
Scoring by quarter: 19–17, 16–15, 13–29, 26–31
| Pts: Abdullah 29; Rebs: Abdullah 10; Asts: Abdullah, Al-Fahad 4 | | Pts: Lee H.J., Lee J.H. 21; Rebs: Shin M.S. 11; Asts: Kim D.J. 10 |

BritAma Arena, Jakarta
Referees: Walid Marcel Abirached (LIB), Chan Ho Ming (HKG), Haryanto Sutaryo (INA)

30 October 2015
14:00

Boxscore

| China | 67–56 | Iraq |
Scoring by quarter: 14–11, 10–12, 25–15, 18–18
| Pts: Zhu R.Z. 23; Rebs: Zhu R.Z. 16; Asts: Wang Y.B. 4 | | Pts: Abdullah 24; Rebs: Abdullah 7 Asts: Al-Fahad 3 |

BritAma Arena, Jakarta
Referees: Ahmed Al Bulushi (OMA), Shigeyuki Arisawa (JPN), Georges Saad (LIB)

30 October 2015
18:00

Boxscore

| India | 85–104 | South Korea |
Scoring by quarter: 23–26, 13–22, 32–28, 17–28
| Pts: Poiyamozhi 33; Rebs: Poiyamozhi 10; Asts: Sisodiya 6 | | Pts: Yang J.M. 25; Rebs: Yang J.M. 12; Asts: Park M.W. 6 |

GOR Pulogadung, Jakarta
Referees: Walid Marcel Abirached (LIB), Herman (INA), Budi Marfan (INA)

31 October 2015
12:00

Boxscore

| South Korea | 65–91 | China |
Scoring by quarter: 23–19, 8–21, 16–32, 18–19
| Pts: Seo M.J. 13; Rebs: Lee H.J. 6 Asts: Yang J.M. 4 | | Pts: Li X.B. 18; Rebs: Zhu R.Z. 9 Asts: Bai H.T. |

BritAma Arena, Jakarta
Referees: Mohammed Alamiri (KUW), Hatim Alharbi (KSA), Joenard Garcia (PHI)

31 October 2015
18:00

Boxscore

| Iraq | 90–69 | India |
Scoring by quarter: 25–16, 24–20, 26–8, 15–25
| Pts: Abdullah 39; Rebs: Jasim 16; Asts: Al-Qarnawi, Jasim 4 | | Pts: Poiyamozhi 26; Rebs: Jayakumar 8 Asts: Sisodiya 6 |

GOR Pulogadung, Jakarta
Referees: Ahmed Al Bulushi (OMA), Shigeyuki Arisawa (JPN), Wang Mei (CHN)

== Second round ==
=== Group E ===
| Pos | Team | Pld | W | L | PF | PA | PD | Pts | Qualification |
|---|---|---|---|---|---|---|---|---|---|
| 1 | Chinese Taipei | 5 | 5 | 0 | 426 | 343 | +83 | 10 | Advance to final round |
| 2 | Lebanon | 5 | 4 | 1 | 427 | 377 | +50 | 9 | Advance to final round |
| 3 | Japan | 5 | 3 | 2 | 386 | 294 | +92 | 8 | Advance to final round |
| 4 | Kuwait | 5 | 2 | 3 | 355 | 374 | −19 | 7 | Advance to final round |
| 5 | Indonesia (H) | 5 | 1 | 4 | 294 | 392 | −98 | 6 | Proceed to classification round |
| 6 | Malaysia | 5 | 0 | 5 | 314 | 422 | −108 | 5 | Proceed to classification round |

Source: FIBA
Rules for classification: 1) Points; 2) Head-to-head results; 3) Points difference; 4) Points scored; 5) Drawing of lots.
(H) Hosts

1 November 2015
12:00

Boxscore

| Chinese Taipei | 90–59 | Malaysia |
Scoring by quarter: 22–21, 28–16, 20–10, 20–12
| Pts: Lin T.C. 29; Rebs: Wu P.C. 10; Asts: Chen Y.W. 8 | | Pts: K. Lim 19; Rebs: K. Lim 7 Asts: Thea Z.S. 3 |

BritAma Arena, Jakarta
Referees: Kim Jong-Kuk (KOR), Wahran Al Hasnawi (IRQ), Suebpong Wichaiphin (THA)

1 November 2015
16:00

Boxscore

| Kuwait | 79–81 | Lebanon |
Scoring by quarter: 15–22, 19–15, 23–23, 22–21
| Pts: Aloutaibi 29; Rebs: Hasan 9 Asts: Alali, Madeed 4 | | Pts: Alaaeddine 32; Rebs: Zeinoun 13; Asts: Zeinoun 8 |

GOR Pulogadung, Jakarta
Referees: Ahmed Al Bulushi (OMA), Joenard Garcia (PHI), Yan Jun (CHN)

1 November 2015
18:00

Boxscore

| Japan | 80–39 | Indonesia |
Scoring by quarter: 16–7, 28–16, 17–0, 19–16
| Pts: Takahara 17; Rebs: Miyamoto 7 Asts: Shimajiri 5 | | Pts: Noor 11; Rebs: Agviandi 10; Asts: Ray 4 |

BritAma Arena, Jakarta
Referees: Hatim Alharbi (KSA), Lee Kyoung-Hwan (KOR), Mohamed Hasan Alsalam (BRN)

2 November 2015
12:00

Boxscore

| Chinese Taipei | 80–67 | Kuwait |
Scoring by quarter: 21–10, 17–15, 20–29, 22–13
| Pts: Tang W.C. 30; Rebs: Tang W.C. 14; Asts: Lin Y.C., Chen Y.W. 5 | | Pts: Aloutaibi 21; Rebs: Aloutaibi, Husain, Almarri 11; Asts: Madeed, Khribit, Hasan 2 |

BritAma Arena, Jakarta
Referees: Lee Kyoung-Hwan (KOR), Mohamed Hasan Alsalam (BRN), Suebpong Wichaiphin (THA)

2 November 2015
14:00

Boxscore

| Lebanon | 84–70 | Japan |
Scoring by quarter: 28–14, 20–20, 13–18, 23–18
| Pts: Alaaeddine 23; Rebs: Saad 16; Asts: Captan 6 | | Pts: Nishida 26; Rebs: Mimori 8 Asts: Nakata, Nishida 4 |

BritAma Arena, Jakarta
Referees: Kim Jong-Kuk (KOR), Yan Jun (CHN), Joenard Garcia (PHI)

2 November 2015
18:00

Boxscore

| Indonesia | 81–71 | Malaysia |
Scoring by quarter: 18–22, 22–12, 16–18, 25–19
| Pts: Noor 20; Rebs: Agviandi 10; Asts: Ray 8 | | Pts: Suresh Mahadevan 19; Rebs: Chang 10; Asts: Lee J.K. 6 |

BritAma Arena, Jakarta
Referees: Snehal Bendke (IND), Wahran Al Hasnawi (IRQ), Wang Mei (CHN)

3 November 2015
12:00

Boxscore

| Japan | 75–83 | Chinese Taipei |
Scoring by quarter: 20–27, 14–19, 15–16, 26–21
| Pts: Nishida 22; Rebs: Kagitomi 7 Asts: Takahara 4 | | Pts: Lin T.C. 24; Rebs: Wu P.C. 16; Asts: Chen Y.W. 6 |

BritAma Arena, Jakarta
Referees: Hatim Alharbi (KSA), Wang Mei (CHN), Mohamed Hasan Alsalam (BRN)

3 November 2015
14:00

Boxscore

| Malaysia | 79–83 | Lebanon |
Scoring by quarter: 21–25, 18–6, 17–27, 23–25
| Pts: K. Lim 18; Rebs: K. Lim 9 Asts: Lee J.K., K. Lim, Low K.Y. 4 | | Pts: Zeinoun 36; Rebs: El Beyrouty 16; Asts: Zeinoun 7 |

BritAma Arena, Jakarta
Referees: Mohammad Alamiri (KUW), Joenard Garcia (PHI), Suebpong Wichaiphin (THA)

3 November 2015
18:00

Boxscore

| Kuwait | 79–63 | Indonesia |
Scoring by quarter: 20–12, 19–15, 15–12, 25–24
| Pts: Aloutaibi 25; Rebs: Hasan 16; Asts: Aloutaibi, Hasan 3 | | Pts: Rizqiano 15; Rebs: Rizqiano 7 Asts: Maulana 5 |

BritAma Arena, Jakarta
Referees: Ahmed Al Bulushi (OMA), Yan Jun (CHN), Lee Kyoung-Hwan (KOR)

=== Group F ===
| Pos | Team | Pld | W | L | PF | PA | PD | Pts | Qualification |
|---|---|---|---|---|---|---|---|---|---|
| 1 | China | 5 | 4 | 1 | 406 | 270 | +136 | 9 (Note: 1–1, 1.140 (beaten South Korea, lost to Philippines)) | Advance to final round |
| 2 | Philippines | 5 | 4 | 1 | 398 | 327 | +71 | 9 (Note: 1–1, 1.020 (beaten China, lost to South Korea)) | Advance to final round |
| 3 | South Korea | 5 | 4 | 1 | 400 | 360 | +40 | 9 (Note: 1–1, 0.861 (beaten Philippines, lost to China)) | Advance to final round |
| 4 | Thailand | 5 | 2 | 3 | 248 | 344 | −96 | 7 | Advance to final round |
| 5 | Iraq | 5 | 1 | 4 | 312 | 333 | −21 | 6 | Proceed to classification round |
| 6 | Bahrain | 5 | 0 | 5 | 272 | 402 | −130 | 5 | Proceed to classification round |

Source: FIBA
Rules for classification: 1) Points; 2) Head-to-head results; 3) Points difference; 4) Points scored; 5) Drawing of lots.
Notes:

1 November 2015
10:00

Boxscore

| Thailand | 52–76 | South Korea |
Scoring by quarter: 7–20, 18–17, 13–12, 14–27
| Pts: Banchathon 17; Rebs: Thanarojwongsa 8 Asts: Limjittakorn, Phithakphawasutthi 3 | | Pts: Lee H.J. 20; Rebs: Shin M.S. 10; Asts: Park M.C. 6 |

BritAma Arena, Jakarta
Referees: Snehal Bendke (IND), Shigeyuki Arisawa (JPN), Chan Ho Ming (HKG)

1 November 2015
14:00

Boxscore

| China | 85–43 | Bahrain |
Scoring by quarter: 16–18, 20–12, 29–8, 20–5
| Pts: Zhu R.Z. 17; Rebs: Zhu R.Z. 9 Asts: Xu J., Wang Y.B., Bai H.T. 4 | | Pts: B. Ali 8 Rebs: Alsaffar, Aboukuora 5 Asts: Abdulhusain 4 |

BritAma Arena, Jakarta
Referees: Georges Saad (LIB), Lan Wei-hsiung (TPE), Sabuj Md. Miha (BAN)

1 November 2015
16:00

Boxscore

| Philippines | 78–69 | Iraq |
Scoring by quarter: 23–17, 17–16, 20–11, 18–25
| Pts: Mamuyac 16; Rebs: Tibayan 12; Asts: Belangel 6 | | Pts: Abdullah 26; Rebs: Abdullah 11; Asts: Abdullah 3 |

BritAma Arena, Jakarta
Referees: Mohammad Alamiri (KUW), Walid Marcel Abirached (LIB), Herman (INA)

2 November 2015
10:00

Boxscore

| China | 91–28 | Thailand |
Scoring by quarter: 22–7, 22–11, 27–0, 20–10
| Pts: Li X. 18; Rebs: Zhao Y. 10; Asts: Wang J. 6 | | Pts: Limjittakorn 7 Rebs: Intaranam 5 Asts: Jaimsawad 3 |

BritAma Arena, Jakarta
Referees: Mohammad Alamiri (KUW), Herman (INA), Sabuj Md. Miha (BAN)

2 November 2015
16:00

Boxscore

| Bahrain | 44–64 | Iraq |
Scoring by quarter: 11–12, 7–14, 14–22, 12–16
| Pts: Abdulkarim 21; Rebs: Aboukuora 11; Asts: Abdulhusain, Ali 3 | | Pts: Al-Madhhachi 16; Rebs: Jasim 13; Asts: Al-Fahad 8 |

GOR Pulogadung, Jakarta
Referees: Hatim Alharbi (KSA), Chan Ho Ming (HKG), Georges Saad (LIB)

2 November 2015
16:00

Boxscore

| South Korea | 77–74 | Philippines |
Scoring by quarter: 25–20, 17–17, 20–18, 15–19
| Pts: Lee H.J. 22; Rebs: Shin M.S. 15; Asts: Shin M.S. 7 | | Pts: Mamuyac 18; Rebs: Tibayan 12; Asts: Belangel 9 |

BritAma Arena, Jakarta
Referees: Ahmed Al Bulushi (OMA), Walid Marcel Abirached (LIB), Yuji Higashi (JPN)

3 November 2015
10:00

Boxscore

| Thailand | 52–49 | Iraq |
Scoring by quarter: 11–10, 12–9, 10–18, 19–12
| Pts: Banchathon 17; Rebs: Thanarojwongsa 7 Asts: Phithakphawasutthi, Jaimsawad 4 | | Pts: Abdullah, Jasim 12; Rebs: Jasim 13; Asts: Al-Fahad 5 |

BritAma Arena, Jakarta
Referees: Snehal Bendke (IND), Shigeyuki Arisawa (JPN), Georges Saad (LIB)

3 November 2015
16:00

Boxscore

| Philippines | 78–72 | China |
Scoring by quarter: 13–16, 26–17, 14–19, 25–20
| Pts: Mamuyac 22; Rebs: Credo 8 Asts: Mamuyac, Credo 5 | | Pts: Bai H.T. 21; Rebs: Zhu R.Z. 13; Asts: Wang Y.B. 4 |

BritAma Arena, Jakarta
Referees: Yuji Higashi (JPN), Kim Jong-Kuk (KOR), Haryanto Sutaryo (INA)

3 November 2015
16:00

Boxscore

| Bahrain | 69–90 | South Korea |
Scoring by quarter: 13–21, 9–28, 20–15, 27–26
| Pts: B. Ali 15; Rebs: Aboukuora 19; Asts: B. Ali 7 | | Pts: Seomoon S.C. 20; Rebs: Park M.W. 8 Asts: Lee J.H. 9 |

GOR Pulogadung, Jakarta
Referees: Walid Marcel Abirached (LIB), Wahran Al Hasnawi (IRQ), Budi Marfan (INA)

== Classification round ==
=== Classification 13th–15th ===
13–15th place semifinals
1 November
Hong Kong | 77
Bangladesh | 65
1 November
BYE
India

Thirteenth place game
2 November
Hong Kong | 70
India | 80
Fifteenth place game
2 November
Bangladesh
BYE

==== 13–15th place semifinals ====
1 November 2015
14:00

Boxscore

| Hong Kong | 77–65 | Bangladesh |
Scoring by quarter: 27–14, 17–9, 14–12, 19–30
| Pts: Yip Y.P. 15; Rebs: Yip Y.P. 11; Asts: Lau T.W. 4 | | Pts: Prodhan 26; Rebs: Prodhan 12; Asts: Rusho 7 |

GOR Pulogadung, Jakarta
Referees: Wang Mei (CHN), Yuji Higashi (JPN), Haryanto Sutaryo (INA)

==== 13th place game ====
2 November 2015
14:00

Boxscore

| Hong Kong | 70–80 | India |
Scoring by quarter: 19–14, 17–24, 11–20, 23–22
| Pts: Yip Y.P. 21; Rebs: Yip Y.P. 12; Asts: Lin M.C. 5 | | Pts: Poiyamozhi 22; Rebs: Tomar, Poiyamozhi 8 Asts: Sisodiya 7 |

GOR Pulogadung, Jakarta
Referees: Shigeyuki Arisawa (JPN), Lan Wei-hsiung (TPE), Haryanto Sutaryo (INA)

=== Classification 9th–12th ===
9–12th place semifinals
5 November
Indonesia | 82
Bahrain | 81
5 November
Iraq | 75
Malaysia | 49

Ninth place game
6 November
Indonesia | 56
Iraq | 71
Eleventh place game
6 November
Bahrain | 84
Malaysia | 87

==== 9–12th place semifinals ====
5 November 2015
14:00

Boxscore

| Indonesia | 82–81 | Bahrain |
Scoring by quarter: 16–24, 20–16, 23–17, 23–24
| Pts: Noor, Maulana 15; Rebs: Agviandi 12; Asts: Maulana 7 | | Pts: B. Ali 17; Rebs: Aboukuora 9 Asts: Abdulhusain 5 |

GOR Pulogadung, Jakarta
Referees: Wang Mei (CHN), Chan Ho Ming (HKG), Joenard Garcia (PHI)

5 November 2015
16:00

Boxscore

| Iraq | 75–49 | Malaysia |
Scoring by quarter: 23–16, 10–9, 20–12, 22–12
| Pts: Abdullah 18; Rebs: Al-Saedi 14; Asts: Abdullah 5 | | Pts: K. Lim 17; Rebs: Suresh Mahadevan 5 Asts: Lee J.K. 6 |

GOR Pulogadung, Jakarta
Referees: Yan Jun (CHN), Yuji Higashi (JPN), Lan Wei-hsiung (TPE)

==== Eleventh place game ====
6 November 2015
14:00

Boxscore

| Bahrain | 84–87 | Malaysia |
Scoring by quarter: 21–16, 24–27, 12–21, 27–23
| Pts: Abdulhusain, Abdulkarim 18; Rebs: Aboukuora 12; Asts: B. Ali 7 | | Pts: K. Lim 18; Rebs: Chang 7 Asts: Inpik 7 |

GOR Pulogadung, Jakarta
Referees: Yan Jun (CHN), Haryanto Sutaryo (INA), Suebpong Wichaiphin (THA)

==== Ninth place game ====
6 November 2015
16:00

Boxscore

| Indonesia | 56–71 | Iraq |
Scoring by quarter: 15–14, 16–21, 13–15, 12–21
| Pts: Rizqiano 12; Rebs: Rizqiano, Agviandi 8 Asts: Rizqiano, Ray 4 | | Pts: Abdullah 32; Rebs: Jasim 14; Asts: Jasim 6 |

GOR Pulogadung, Jakarta
Referees: Lee Kyoung-Hwan (KOR), Shigeki Arisawa (JPN), Georges Saad (LIB)

== Final round ==
=== Bracket ===
Fifth place
F2 | Philippines | 89
E2 | Lebanon | 74
Seventh place
F4 | Thailand | 69
E4 | Kuwait | 49

Consolation semifinals
F4 | Thailand | 46
F2 | Philippines | 81
E4 | Kuwait | 56
E2 | Lebanon | 79

Quarterfinals
E1 | Chinese Taipei | 88
F4 | Thailand | 39
F2 | Philippines | 66
E3 | Japan | 73
F1 | China | 103
E4 | Kuwait | 42
E2 | Lebanon | 79
F3 | South Korea | 105

Semifinals
E1 | Chinese Taipei | 60
E3 | Japan | 57
F1 | China | 84
F3 | South Korea | 90

Final
E1 | Chinese Taipei | 69
F3 | South Korea | 78
Third place
E3 | Japan | 58
F1 | China | 80

=== Quarterfinals ===
5 November 2015
12:00

Boxscore

| Chinese Taipei | 88–39 | Thailand |
Scoring by quarter: 16–9, 25–16, 30–12, 17–2
| Pts: Lin T.C. 18; Rebs: Chang C.Y. 8 Asts: Chen Y.W. 7 | | Pts: Banchathon 12; Rebs: Phithaphawasutthi 7 Asts: Phithaphawasutthi, Jaimsawad 2 |

BritAma Arena, Jakarta
Referees: Kim Jong-Kuk (KOR), Mohamed Hasan Alsalam (BRN), Georges Saad (LIB)

5 November 2015
14:00

Boxscore

| Lebanon | 79–105 | South Korea |
Scoring by quarter: 19–25, 13–22, 27–21, 20–37
| Pts: Zeinoun 32; Rebs: Zeinoun 15; Asts: Alaaeddine 5 | | Pts: Yang J.M. 36; Rebs: Lee H.J., Yang J.M., Shin M.S. 6 Asts: Kim D.J. 8 |

BritAma Arena, Jakarta
Referees: Ahmed Al Bulushi (OMA), Snehal Bendke (IND), Herman (INA)

5 November 2015
16:00

Boxscore

| Japan | 73–66 | Philippines |
Scoring by quarter: 23–9, 23–21, 17–15, 10–21
| Pts: Nishida 20; Rebs: Mimori 9 Asts: Ito 6 | | Pts: Belangel 20; Rebs: Credo 9 Asts: Belangel 5 |

BritAma Arena, Jakarta
Referees: Mohammad Alamiri (KUW), Lee Kyoung-Hwan (KOR), Walid Marcel Abirached (LIB)

5 November 2015
18:00

Boxscore

| Kuwait | 42–103 | China |
Scoring by quarter: 10–25, 15–29, 12–20, 5–29
| Pts: Hasan 14; Rebs: Hasan 4 Asts: Aloutaibi 2 | | Pts: Zhu R.Z. 19; Rebs: Wang R. 12; Asts: Wang Y.B. 10 |

BritAma Arena, Jakarta
Referees: Hatim Alharbi (KSA), Shigeyuki Arisawa (JPN), Budi Marfan (INA)

=== 5–8th place semifinals ===
6 November 2015
12:00

Boxscore

| Thailand | 46–81 | Philippines |
Scoring by quarter: 16–23, 9–33, 11–14, 10–11
| Pts: Banchathon 9 Rebs: Thanarojwongsa 9 Asts: Jaimsawad 5 | | Pts: Gomez de Liano 16; Rebs: Gomez de Liano, Gozum 9 Asts: Lagumen 7 |

BritAma Arena, Jakarta
Referees: Kim Jong-Kuk (KOR), Herman (INA), Lan Wei-hsiung (TPE),

6 November 2015
14:00

Boxscore

| Lebanon | 79–56 | Kuwait |
Scoring by quarter: 14–18, 24–15, 15–11, 26—12
| Pts: Zeinoun, Alaaeddine 15; Rebs: Saad 10; Asts: Captan 3 | | Pts: Husain 18; Rebs: Husain 13; Asts: Aloutaibi 6 |

BritAma Arena, Jakarta
Referees: Wang Mei (CHN), Yuji Higashi (JPN), Mohamed Hasan Alsalam (BRN)

=== Semifinals ===
6 November 2015
16:00

Boxscore

| Chinese Taipei | 60–57 | Japan |
Scoring by quarter: 20–12, 6–12, 17–10, 17–23
| Pts: Tang W.C. 21; Rebs: Han C.Y. 13; Asts: Chen Y.W. 6 | | Pts: Takahara 12; Rebs: Hachimura 11; Asts: Nakata 4 |

BritAma Arena, Jakarta
Referees: Ahmed Al Bulushi (OMA), Walid Marcel Abirached (LIB), Joenard Garcia (PHI)

6 November 2015
18:00

Boxscore

| South Korea | 90–84 | China |
Scoring by quarter: 23–20, 20–26, 26–21, 21–17
| Pts: Yang J.M. 30; Rebs: Shin M.S. 10; Asts: Kim D.J. 13 | | Pts: Wang R. 20; Rebs: Wang R. 8 Asts: Xu 6 |

BritAma Arena, Jakarta
Referees: Mohammad Alamiri (KUW), Hatim Alharbi (KSA), Snehal Bendke (IND)

=== Seventh place game ===
7 November 2015
12:00

Boxscore

| Thailand | 69–49 | Kuwait |
Scoring by quarter: 16–24, 13–5, 18–10, 22–10
| Pts: Banchathon 20; Rebs: Limjittakorn 14; Asts: Jaimsawad 8 | | Pts: Husain 20; Rebs: Aloutaibi, Hasan 13; Asts: Aloutaibi 4 |

BritAma Arena, Jakarta
Referees: Kim Jong-Kuk (KOR), Shigeyuki Arisawa (JPN), Budi Marfan (INA)

=== Fifth place game ===
7 November 2015
14:00

Boxscore

| Philippines | 89–74 | Lebanon |
Scoring by quarter: 17–14, 33–20, 21–18, 18–22
| Pts: Tibayan 16; Rebs: Ildefonso 10; Asts: Mamuyac 8 | | Pts: Alaaeddine 28; Rebs: El Beyrouty 11; Asts: Zeinoun 5 |

BritAma Arena, Jakarta
Referees: Wang Mei (CHN), Mohamed Hasan Alsalam (BRN), Yuji Higashi (JPN)

=== Third place game ===
7 November 2015
16:00

Boxscore

| Japan | 58–80 | China |
Scoring by quarter: 16–14, 8–23, 18–21, 16–22
| Pts: Nishida 18; Rebs: Nishida 6 Asts: Ito 3 | | Pts: Wang R. 22; Rebs: Wu Y.J., Wang R. 9 Asts: Bai H.T. 7 |

BritAma Arena, Jakarta
Referees: Ahmed Al Bulushi (OMA), Hatim Alharbi (KSA), Joenard Garcia (PHI)

=== Final ===
7 November 2015
18:00

Boxscore

| Chinese Taipei | 69–78 | South Korea |
Scoring by quarter: 19–18, 12–12, 15–28, 23–20
| Pts: Lin T.C. 19; Rebs: Wu P.C. 20; Asts: Chen Y.W. 6 | | Pts: Lee J.H., Park M.W. 17; Rebs: Yang J.M., Park M.W., Shin M.S. 6 Asts: Yang J.M. 7 |

BritAma Arena, Jakarta
Referees: Mohammad Alamiri (KUW), Walid Marcel Abirached (LIB), Snehal Bendke (IND)

== Final standing ==
| Qualified for the 2016 FIBA Under-17 World Championship |

| Rank | Team | Record |
|---|---|---|
| 1st place, gold medalist(s) | South Korea | 8–1 |
| 2nd place, silver medalist(s) | Chinese Taipei | 8–1 |
| 3rd place, bronze medalist(s) | China | 7–2 |
| 4 | Japan | 5–4 |
| 5 | Philippines | 6–2 |
| 6 | Lebanon | 6–3 |
| 7 | Thailand | 3–5 |
| 8 | Kuwait | 2–7 |
| 9 | Iraq | 4–4 |
| 10 | Indonesia | 3–5 |
| 11 | Malaysia | 2–6 |
| 12 | Bahrain | 0–7 |
| 13 | India | 1–3 |
| 14 | Hong Kong | 2–3 |
| 15 | Bangladesh | 0–4 |

== Awards ==
2015 FIBA Asia Under-16 champions

South Korea
First title
