= Uzbekistan men's national under-16 basketball team =

Uzbekistan
- FIBA zone: FIBA Asia
- National federation: Basketball Federation of Uzbekistan

U17 World Cup
- Appearances: None

U16 Asia Cup
- Appearances: 1 (2011)
- Medals: None

The Uzbekistan men's national under-16 basketball team is a national basketball team of Uzbekistan, administered by the Basketball Federation of Uzbekistan. It represents the country in men's international under-16 basketball competitions.

== FIBA Under-16 Asia Cup ==
So far, Uzbekistan's only participation at the FIBA Under-16 Asia Cup was in 2011, where they finished in 14th place.

== See also ==
- Uzbekistan men's national basketball team
- Uzbekistan women's national under-16 basketball team
