= Tajikistan women's national basketball team =

Tajikistan
- FIBA ranking: NR (9 February 2025)
- Joined FIBA: 1994
- FIBA zone: FIBA Asia
- National federation: Basketball Federation of Republic Tajikistan

Olympic Games
- Appearances: None

World Cup
- Appearances: None

Asia Cup
- Appearances: None

Asian Games
- Appearances: None
| Home | Away |

The Tajikistan women's national basketball team is the women's basketball side that represents Tajikistan in international competitions.

The team usually plays friendly matches with teams of Iran and Afghanistan.

== Competition record ==
=== FIBA Women's Asia Cup record ===
- Yet to participate

=== Asian Games record ===
- Yet to participate

=== FIBA Asia Under-18 Championship for Women record ===
- Yet to participate
