= Hong Kong men's national under-16 basketball team =

Hong Kong
- FIBA zone: FIBA Asia
- National federation: Basketball Association of Hong Kong, China

U17 World Cup
- Appearances: None

U16 Asia Cup
- Appearances: 3
- Medals: None

First international
- Bahrain 85–60 Hong Kong (Tehran, Iran; 25 September 2013)

Biggest win
- Kuwait 59–71 Hong Kong (Jakarta, Indonesia; 30 October 2015)

Biggest defeat
- Hong Kong 46–124 China (Foshan, China; 3 April 2018)

The Hong Kong men's national under-16 basketball team is a national basketball team of Hong Kong, administered by the Basketball Association of Hong Kong, China. It represents the region in men's international under-16 basketball competitions.

== FIBA U16 Asia Cup participations ==
Year	Result
2013	13th
2015	14th
2017	11th

== See also ==
- Hong Kong men's national basketball team
- Hong Kong men's national under-18 basketball team
- Hong Kong women's national under-16 basketball team
