= Bahrain Basketball Association =

- Formation: 1974 BBA was established
- Headquarters: P.O. Box 5143
- Location: Manama, Bahrain
- President: Mr. Alaa Madara
- TV Partner: Bahrain Sport TV
- Affiliations: FIBA; FIBA Asia; Bahrain Olympic Committee
- Website: https://basketball.bh

Basketball was introduced in Bahrain through schools’ matches at the early 1940s when the first game between Kuwait and Bahrain teams was played at the Industrial School grounds in Manama. In 1974 the Bahrain Basketball Association (BBA) was established, thanks to zealous efforts by Shaikh Ali bin Khalifa Al Khalifa, the promoter and first BBA president, a position he held up until 2000, and oversaw the development of the game from its inception to full-fledged stage, until the attainment by Bahrain of a pioneering role in the game among Arab countries.

With the inception of the BBA the game activities expanded into a full sports occasion, thereby fruitfully exploiting the efforts of the players. In 1974 the Bahrain team participated in two championships, namely, the 7th Asian Games Championship in Tehran, and the first and second Arab Championships in Baghdad and Kuwait (1976), respectively, followed by a string of participation events.

In September 2016 Shaikh Isa bin Ali bin Khalifa Al Khalifa was elected President of BBA, following a unanimous vote. He took the administrative and technical work of the BBA to a qualitative stage, using a new vision focusing on the single objective of developing and enhancing the game.

On 11 October 2019, Shaikh Khalid bin Hamad Al Khalifa ordered a temporarily reformation of BBA after the resignation of 5 board members out of 9 including the president.

The current President of BBA is Mr. Alaa Madara who was elected on 22 September 2024.

== Leagues ==
- Zain League
- Zain Super
- Khalifa Bin Salman Cup
