= Basketball Association of Hong Kong, China =

Governing body of basketball

- Founded: 1957; 69 years ago
- Affiliation: FIBA
- Affiliation date: 1957
- Regional affiliation: FIBA Asia
- Headquarters: So Kon Po, Hong Kong
- President: Reman Chan Siu Wong

Official website
- basketball.org.hk

The Basketball Association of Hong Kong, China (BAHKC, Chinese: 中國香港籃球總會) is the governing body of basketball in Hong Kong.

The Basketball Association of Hong Kong, China operates the Hong Kong men's national team and Hong Kong women's national team. They organise national competitions in Hong Kong, for both the men's and women's senior teams and also the youth national basketball teams.

The top professional league in Hong Kong is the Hong Kong A1 Division Championship.

== See also ==
- Hong Kong men's national basketball team
- Hong Kong men's national under-18 basketball team
- Hong Kong men's national under-16 basketball team
- Hong Kong men's national 3x3 team
- Hong Kong women's national basketball team
- Hong Kong women's national under-18 basketball team
- Hong Kong women's national under-16 basketball team
- Hong Kong women's national 3x3 team
