= Ali Noorzad =

Afghan basketball player (born 1985)

Personal information
- Born: November 21, 1985 (age 40)
- Listed height: 6 ft 3 in (1.91 m)
- Listed weight: 200 lb (91 kg)

Career information
- High school: Cherry Hill East (Cherry Hill, New Jersey)
- College: Rutgers–Camden (2010–2011)
- Position: Shooting guard / small forward

Ali Noorzad (Persian: علی نورزاد; born 21 November 1985) is an Afghan international basketball player. He played college basketball for the Rutgers–Camden Scarlet Raptors during the 2010–11 season.

He represented Afghanistan's national basketball team at the 2010 Asian Games in Guangzhou, China, where he played the most minutes for his team.
