= North Korea men's national basketball team =

National sports team

North Korea
- FIBA ranking: NR (1 September 2026)
- Joined FIBA: 1947
- FIBA zone: FIBA Asia
- National federation: Amateur Basketball Association of DPR Korea
- Coach: Un Sik Ji

Olympic Games
- Appearances: None

FIBA World Cup
- Appearances: None

FIBA Asia Cup
- Appearances: 2
- Medals: Silver: 1993
Home	Away

The Democratic People's Republic of Korea national basketball team (recognized as Korea DPR by FIBA and known colloquially and in the media as North Korea) represents the Democratic People's Republic of Korea in international basketball and is controlled by the Amateur Basketball Association of DPR of Korea, the governing body for basketball in North Korea.

In December 2013, former American basketball professional Dennis Rodman visited North Korea to help train the national team after he developed a friendship with Supreme Leader Kim Jong Un during his first visit to the country in February 2013. Rodman's visit and a match between the North Korean team and former NBA stars was depicted in the 2015 documentary film Dennis Rodman's Big Bang in Pyongyang.

North Korea regularly competed in international tournaments from the 1970s through the 2000s. However in 2012, FIBA announced a major overhaul of its international qualification process beginning in 2017. The new format replaced isolated summer tournaments with multiple qualification windows throughout the year featuring home-and-away matches between teams. This shift requires regular international travel for players, coaches, referees, and media personnel. North Korea has never fielded a men's national team for competition since this change was put into effect. Their last appearance was the 2010 Asian Games.

== Roster ==
The following is the North Korea roster in the men's basketball tournament of the 2010 Asian Games.

North Korea roster
Players
Coaches

Pos.	No.	Nat.	Name	Ht.	Wt.	Age
G	4	(North Korea)	Choe Jin-song	1.83 m (6 ft 0 in)	87 kg (192 lb)
G	6	(North Korea)	Il Ho	1.83 m (6 ft 0 in)	85 kg (187 lb)
F	7	(North Korea)	An Bin-yong	1.85 m (6 ft 1 in)	78 kg (172 lb)
F	8	(North Korea)	Pak Jin-myong	1.91 m (6 ft 3 in)	82 kg (181 lb)
G	9	(North Korea)	Pak Chol-un	1.85 m (6 ft 1 in)	81 kg (179 lb)
F	10	(North Korea)	Sin Byol-kum	1.91 m (6 ft 3 in)	87 kg (192 lb)
G	11	(North Korea)	Kwang Kye	1.80 m (5 ft 11 in)	84 kg (185 lb)
F/C	12	(North Korea)	Kim Chol-un	1.93 m (6 ft 4 in)	83 kg (183 lb)
G	13	(North Korea)	Hyok Jin-o	1.83 m (6 ft 0 in)	84 kg (185 lb)
F	14	(North Korea)	Ri Song-kum	1.88 m (6 ft 2 in)	87 kg (192 lb)
F	15	(North Korea)	Kim Myong-chang	1.88 m (6 ft 2 in)	81 kg (179 lb)

Head coach

- (North Korea) Un Sik-ji

Assistant coach(es)

- (North Korea) Won Gil-so

Legend

- (C) Team captain
- Injured

- Roster

== Tournament records ==
=== FIBA Asia Cup ===
Year	Position	Pld	W	L
(Philippines) 1960	Did not enter			
(Taiwan) 1963	Did not enter			
(Malaysia) 1965	Did not enter			
(South Korea) 1967	Did not enter			
(Thailand) 1969	Did not enter			
(Japan) 1971	Did not enter			
(Philippines) 1973	Did not enter			
(Thailand) 1975	Did not enter			
(Malaysia) 1977	Did not enter			
(Japan) 1979	Did not enter			
(India) 1981	Did not enter			
(Hong Kong) 1983	Did not enter			
(Malaysia) 1985	Did not enter			
(Thailand) 1987	Did not enter			
(China) 1989	Did not enter			
(Japan) 1991	5th place	8	5	3
(Indonesia) 1993	Runners-up	6	5	1
(South Korea) 1995	Did not enter			
(Saudi Arabia) 1997	Did not enter			
(Japan) 1999	Withdrew			
(China) 2001	Withdrew			
(China) 2003	Did not enter			
(Qatar) 2005	Did not enter			
(Japan) 2007	Did not enter			
(China) 2009	Did not enter			
(China) 2011	Did not enter			
(Philippines) 2013	Did not enter			
(China) 2015	Did not enter			
(Lebanon) 2017	Did not enter			
(Indonesia) 2022	Did not enter			
(Saudi Arabia) 2025	Did not enter			
2029	Did not enter			
Total	2/32	14	10	4

=== Asian Games ===
Year	Rank	Pld	W	L
(India) 1951	Did not enter			
(Philippines) 1954	Did not enter			
(Japan) 1958	Did not enter			
(Indonesia) 1962	Did not enter			
(Thailand) 1966	Did not enter			
(Thailand) 1970	Did not enter			
(Iran) 1974	5th place	4	3	1
(Thailand) 1978	3rd place	9	7	2
(India) 1982	5th place	7	3	4
(South Korea) 1986	Did not enter			
(China) 1990	8th place	6	2	4
(Japan) 1994	Did not enter			
(Thailand) 1998	Did not enter			
(South Korea) 2002	5th place	5	2	3
(Qatar) 2006	Did not enter			
(China) 2010	8th place	8	3	5
(South Korea) 2014	Did not enter			
(Indonesia) 2018	Did not enter			
(China) 2022	Did not enter			
(Japan) 2026	Did not enter			
Total	6/17	39	20	19

== See also ==
- Basketball in North Korea
- North Korea national under-17 basketball team
- North Korea women's national basketball team
