= Afghanistan men's national basketball team =

Men's national basketball team

Afghanistan
- FIBA ranking: NR (13 July 2026)
- Joined FIBA: 1968
- FIBA zone: FIBA Asia
- National federation: Afghanistan National Basketball Federation

South Asian Games
- Appearances: 1 (first in 2010)
- Medals: Gold: 2010
Home	Away
Medal record
Event / 1st / 2nd / 3rd; South Asian Games / 1 / 0 / 0
South Asian Games
Gold medal – first place	2010 Dhaka

The Afghanistan men's national basketball team (Pashto: د افغانستان د نارینه وو د باسکېتبال ملي لوبډله Persian: تیم ملی بسکتبال مردان افغانستان) is the men's national basketball team of Afghanistan and is controlled by the Afghanistan National Basketball Federation. Afghanistan joined FIBA and became a member of FIBA Asia in 1968. Afghanistan won the 2010 South Asian Games, becoming the first sports team to win gold in the nation's history.

== History ==
=== Early history ===
Basketball was first played in Afghanistan in 1936. In 1966, the Afghanistan National Olympic Committee (ANOC) founded the first national basketball team after receiving challenges from India and Pakistan. Tom Gouttierre, an American Peace Corps volunteer and coach of the team at Habibia High School, became the first coach. Using detailed, confidential instructions from John Wooden, the Afghanistan team became the only other to run the famous UCLA zone press.

Although the international games were canceled, in 1969 Gouttierre returned on a Fulbright Fellowship and again became the Habibia coach, and in 1970 Bill Bradley of the New York Knicks tutored the team while visiting the country. That year China challenged the ANOC. Because of the lack of preparation time, Gouttierre decided that current and former Habibia players were the best choice for a second Afghanistan national team. Using the zone press, it defeated a much larger Chinese team in Parwan Province in the Afghanistan team's first international victory.

=== FIBA Asia Cup ===
Afghanistan has failed to qualify for the FIBA Asia Cup, while as well as only entering in the qualification rounds only once in 2013 when they entered in the South Asian Basketball Association Qualifying Round. Afghanistan would defeat Nepal before losing to India and failing to qualify for the Asia Cup. This is their only appearance in FIBA Asia Cup qualification rounds to date.

=== Asian Games ===
Afghanistan has made two brief appearance in the Asian Games in 2006 and 2010. Both times the men's national team would struggle for success and failing to qualify outside the first round in both years respectively. The 2010 edition would be marked as the last time Afghanistan has played any competitive men's national teams games.

=== South Asian Games ===
Afghanistan would see their best success in international competition in the form of the 2010 edition of the South Asian Games. They would defeat India and claim gold in what has been their only appearance in the South Asian Games to date.

== Competitive record ==
=== Summer Olympics ===
Year	Position	Pld	W	L
(Germany) 1936	Not a FIBA member			
(United Kingdom) 1948	Not a FIBA member			
(Finland) 1952	Not a FIBA member			
(Australia) 1956	Not a FIBA member			
(Italy) 1960	Not a FIBA member			
(Japan) 1964	Not a FIBA member			
(Mexico) 1968	Did not enter			
(Germany) 1972	Did not enter			
(Canada) 1976	Did not enter			
(Soviet Union) 1980	Did not enter			
(United States) 1984	Did not enter			
(South Korea) 1988	Did not enter			
(Spain) 1992	Did not enter			
(United States) 1996	Did not enter			
(Australia) 2000	Did not enter			
(Greece) 2004	Did not enter			
(China) 2008	Did not enter			
(United Kingdom) 2012	Did not enter			
(Brazil) 2016	Did not enter			
(Japan) 2020	Did not enter			
(France) 2024	Did not enter			
(United States) 2028	Did not enter			
Total	0/22	0	0	0

=== FIBA World Cup ===
Year	Position	Pld	W	L
(Argentina) 1950	Not a FIBA member			
(Brazil) 1954	Not a FIBA member			
(Chile) 1959	Not a FIBA member			
(Brazil) 1963	Not a FIBA member			
(Uruguay) 1967	Not a FIBA member			
(Socialist Federal Republic of Yugoslavia) 1970	Did not enter			
(Puerto Rico) 1974	Did not enter			
(Philippines) 1978	Did not enter			
(Colombia) 1982	Did not enter			
(Spain) 1986	Did not enter			
(Argentina) 1990	Did not enter			
(Canada) 1994	Did not enter			
(Greece) 1998	Did not enter			
(United States) 2002	Did not enter			
(Japan) 2006	Did not enter			
(Turkey) 2010	Did not enter			
(Spain) 2014	Did not enter			
(China) 2019	Did not enter			
(Philippines) (Japan) (Indonesia) 2023	Did not enter			
(Qatar) 2027	Did not enter			
(France) 2031	Did not enter			
Total	0/21	0	0	0

=== FIBA Asia Cup ===
Year	Position	Pld	W	L
(Philippines) 1960	Not a FIBA member			
(Taiwan) 1963	Not a FIBA member			
(Malaysia) 1965	Not a FIBA member			
(South Korea) 1967	Not a FIBA member			
(Thailand) 1969	Did not enter			
(Japan) 1971	Did not enter			
(Philippines) 1973	Did not enter			
(Thailand) 1975	Did not enter			
(Malaysia) 1977	Did not enter			
(Japan) 1979	Did not enter			
(India) 1981	Did not enter			
(Hong Kong) 1983	Did not enter			
(Malaysia) 1985	Did not enter			
(Thailand) 1987	Did not enter			
(China) 1989	Did not enter			
(Japan) 1991	Did not enter			
(Indonesia) 1993	Did not enter			
(South Korea) 1995	Did not enter			
(Saudi Arabia) 1997	Did not enter			
(Japan) 1999	Did not enter			
(China) 2001	Did not enter			
(China) 2003	Did not enter			
(Qatar) 2005	Did not enter			
(Japan) 2007	Did not enter			
(China) 2009	Did not enter			
(China) 2011	Did not enter			
(Philippines) 2013	Did not qualify			
(China) 2015	Did not enter			
(Lebanon) 2017	Did not enter			
(Indonesia) 2022	Did not enter			
(Saudi Arabia) 2025	Did not enter			
2029	Did not enter			
Total	0/32	0	0	0

=== Asian Games ===
- 1970-2002 : Did not qualify
- 2006 : 13th
- 2010 : 13th
- 2014-2022 : Did not qualify

=== South Asian Games ===
Year	Position	Pld	W	L
(India) 1987	Not part of SAOC until 2004			
(Sri Lanka) 1991	Not part of SAOC until 2004			
(India) 1995	Not part of SAOC until 2004			
(Bangladesh) 2010	1st place, gold medalist(s)	?	?	?
(Nepal) 2019	Left SAOC in 2016			
Total	0/5	0	0	0

== Honours ==
- South Asian Games
  - Gold Medal: 2010

== Coaches ==
Head Coach:* (United States) Mamo Rafiq – 2007-now

Assistant Coach: * (Afghanistan) Abdul Wasi Pazhman - 2010

Assistant Coach: * (Philippines) Leo Balayon - 2009

== 2010 team ==
The following twelve players were named to the roster for the 2010 Asian Games.

Afghanistan men's national basketball team roster
Players
Coaches

Pos.	No.	Name	Age – Date of birth	Height	Club	Ctr.
G/F	3	Aaron Gholami	14 – January 11, 1996	1.75 m (5 ft 9 in)	Mölndal Basket	(Sweden)
G/F	4	Yousof Etemadi	32 – July 21, 1978	1.95 m (6 ft 5 in)	Malibu Pirates	(United States)
F/C	5	Nafi Mashriqi	30 – December 12, 1979	2.01 m (6 ft 7 in)	NYC Thunder	(United States)
F	6	Qais Haider	23 – June 25, 1987	1.93 m (6 ft 4 in)	Free agent
G/F	7	Masseh Tahiry	21 – July 31, 1989	1.86 m (6 ft 1 in)	Free agent
G	8	Sayed Yussuf Ansary	21 – July 18, 1989	1.83 m (6 ft 0 in)	Free agent
F/C	9	Habib Kabir	23 – May 25, 1987	1.98 m (6 ft 6 in)	Sacramento CC	(United States)
G	10	Abdullah Karimi	27 – December 21, 1982	1.83 m (6 ft 0 in)	Free agent
G/F	11	Haroun Arefi	23 – February 1, 1987	1.93 m (6 ft 4 in)	Free agent
G	12	Ali Noorzad	24 – November 21, 1985	1.93 m (6 ft 4 in)	Free agent
G	13	Safi Mojaddidi	23 – February 2, 1987	1.83 m (6 ft 0 in)	Free agent
G	14	Mohammad Soratgar	19 – May 6, 1991	1.83 m (6 ft 0 in)	Free agent
F	15	Sayed Amiri	22 – August 5, 1988	1.96 m (6 ft 5 in)	Free agent

Head coach

- (United States) Mamo Rafiq

Assistant coach(es)

- (Afghanistan) Abdul Wasi Pazhman

Legend

- (C) Team captain
- (NP) Naturalized player
- Club – describes last
  club before the tournament
- Age – describes age
  on 11 November 2010

=== Depth chart ===
Pos.	Starting 5	Bench 1	Bench 2
C	Nafi Mashriqi	Habib Kabir
PF	Haroun Arefi	Qais Haider
SF	Yousof Etemadi	Masseh Tahiry	Sayed Amiri
SG	Safi Mojaddidi	Sayed Yussuf Ansary
PG	Ali Noorzad	Abdullah Karimi	Mohammad Soratgar

== See also ==
- Afghanistan women's national basketball team
