= Kuwait men's national under-16 basketball team =

Kuwait
- FIBA zone: FIBA Asia
- National federation: Kuwait Basketball Association

U17 World Cup
- Appearances: None

U16 Asia Cup
- Appearances: 3
- Medals: None

The Kuwait men's national under-16 basketball team is a national basketball team of Kuwait, administered by the Kuwait Basketball Association. It represents the country in men's international under-16 basketball competitions.

== FIBA U16 Asia Cup participations ==
Year	Result
2009	13th
2015	12th
2022	12th

== See also ==
- Kuwait men's national basketball team
- Kuwait men's national under-18 basketball team
- Kuwait women's national under-18 basketball team
