= Sheikh Kamal Sports Complex =

Sport complex in Bangladesh

- Location: Dhaka, Bangladesh
- Owner: Abahani Limited Dhaka
- Operator: Abahani Limited Dhaka

Sheikh Kamal Sports Complex also known as the Abahani Sports Complex is a sport complex located in Dhanmondi, Dhaka, Bangladesh. It is owned by Abahani Limited Dhaka. The complex is currently under construction.

Abahani Limited Dhaka commenced construction of the sports complex in Dhanmondi, Dhaka, in January 2023. It will have football, cricket, hockey and volleyball grounds. When finished, it will be the second largest sports complex in Bangladesh, after the Bashundhara Sports Complex.

== Facilities ==
- Abahani Limited Dhaka Football Stadium
- Abahani Limited Dhaka Cricket Stadium
- Abahani Limited Dhaka Volleyball Arena
- Abahani Limited Dhaka Hockey Stadium
