= 2011 FIBA Asia Under-16 Championship =

2011 FIBA U16 Asia Cup
2nd FIBA Under-16 Asian Basketball Championship

Tournament details
- Host country: Vietnam
- Dates: October 18–28
- Teams: 16 (from 44 federations)
- Venue: 1 (in 1 host city)

Final positions
- Champions: China (2nd title)

Tournament statistics
- MVP: (China) Zhou Qi
- Top scorer: (India) Bhamara (19.3)
- Top rebounds: (Japan) Baba (3.7)
- Top assists: (India) A. Singh (4.0)
- PPG (Team): Philippines (89.4)
- RPG (Team): Philippines (15.6)
- APG (Team): Philippines (16.5)

Official website
- 2011 FIBA Asia U-16 Championship

The 2011 FIBA Asia Under-16 Championship was the qualifying tournament for FIBA Asia at the Under-17 World Championship 2012. The tournament was held in Nha Trang, Vietnam from October 18 to October 28. China defeated Korea in the championship to notch their second title, and both the finalists represented FIBA Asia in the 2012 FIBA Under-17 World Championship in Lithuania.

== Qualification ==
According to the FIBA Asia rules, each zone had two places, and the hosts (Vietnam) and holders (China) were automatically qualified. The other four places are allocated to the zones according to performance in the 2009 FIBA Asia Under-16 Championship.

East Asia (1+2+2)	Gulf (2)	Middle Asia (2)	Southeast Asia (1+2+1)	West Asia (2+1)
China	Saudi Arabia	India	Vietnam	Iraq
Chinese Taipei	~~Bahrain~~ *	Uzbekistan	Philippines	Lebanon
Japan			Malaysia	Iran
South Korea			Indonesia	
~~TBD~~ **				

* Bahrain replaced by Qatar.

** Only 4 teams registered from East Asia.

== Draw ==
The draw was held on September 25, 2011, at the Media Conference Room at the Wuhan Sports Center.

Group A	Group B	Group C	Group D
China; India; Malaysia; Chinese Taipei	South Korea; Iraq; Uzbekistan; Lebanon	~~Iran~~ * Qatar; Saudi Arabia; Japan	Philippines; Indonesia; Vietnam

* Iran did not participate in the tournament due to the Vietnamese decision for not granting visa to Iranian players. Vietnamese Basketball Federation offered apology to Iran over failure to send visa for Iranian junior team to join the competition.

== Preliminary round ==
=== Group A ===
Team	Pld	W	L	PF	PA	PD	Pts
China	3	3	0	230	101	+129	6
India	3	2	1	193	156	+37	5
Chinese Taipei	3	1	2	167	185	−18	4
Malaysia	3	0	3	107	255	−148	3

October 18
12:00

Report

Malaysia	37–71	Chinese Taipei
Scoring by quarter: 10–15, 11–22, 2–15, 14–19
Pts: Tan H.K., Keng E.H. 5 Rebs: Keng E.H. 2 Asts: 0		Pts: Lu K.S. 22; Rebs: Wang I.F., Huang C.Y. 2 Asts: 0

Khanh Hoa Sports Hall, Nha Trang
Referees: Rafael Britanico (PHI), Shigeyuki Arisawa (JPN), Choi Moon-Shik (KOR)

October 18
21:00

Report

China	64–27	India
Scoring by quarter: 16–6, 15–4, 15–3, 18–14
Pts: Zhou Q. 15; Rebs: Luo K.W. 1 Asts: 0		Pts: L. Singh 9 Rebs: 0 Asts: 0

Khanh Hoa Sports Hall, Nha Trang
Referees: Perry Stothart (CAN), Abdulrahman Al-Amri (KSA), Le Chuong Giang (VIE)

October 19
15:00

Report

Chinese Taipei	44–75	China
Scoring by quarter: 12–17, 16–21, 9–20, 7–17
Pts: Wang I.F. 13; Rebs: Wang I.F. 1 Asts: 0		Pts: Zhou Q. 24; Rebs: Guo X.P., Lai J.H. 1 Asts: Zhou Q. 1

Khanh Hoa Sports Hall, Nha Trang
Referees: Fedor Dmitriev (BLR), Arnolfo Bermeo (PHI), Ilham Burhanudin (INA)

October 19
21:00

Report

India	93–40	Malaysia
Scoring by quarter: 17–0, 17–8, 30–15, 29–17
Pts: Saminathan 18; Rebs: A. Singh 2 Asts: 0		Pts: Tan Z.H. 11; Rebs: Four players 1 Asts: Ng K.X. 1

Khanh Hoa Sports Hall, Nha Trang
Referees: Yoji Fujigaki (JPN), Ravshan Ganiev (UZB), Le Viet Duc (VIE)

October 20
13:00

Report

Chinese Taipei	52–73	India
Scoring by quarter: 8–21, 18–18, 15–18, 11–16
Pts: Lu K.S. 15; Rebs: Four players 2 Asts: Four players 2		Pts: A. Singh 25; Rebs: Sangwan, A. Singh 4 Asts: A. Singh 5

Khanh Hoa Sports Hall, Nha Trang
Referees: Arnolfo Bermeo (PHI), Nicolas El-Maalouf (LIB), Le Chuong Giang (VIE)

October 20
15:00

Report

Malaysia	30–91	China
Scoring by quarter: 11–29, 10–17, 6–17, 3–28
Pts: Keng E.H. 9 Rebs: Tan H.K., Singh 2 Asts: Foo T.J. 1		Pts: Zhou Q. 16; Rebs: Heng Y.F. 3 Asts: Liu B. 5

Khanh Hoa Sports Hall, Nha Trang
Referees: Herman (INA), Rabee Al-Masri (LIB), Le Viet Duc (VIE)

=== Group B ===
Team	Pld	W	L	PF	PA	PD	Pts
South Korea	3	3	0	284	164	+120	6
Lebanon	3	2	1	248	180	+68	5
Iraq	3	1	2	238	180	+58	4
Uzbekistan	3	0	3	82	328	−246	3

October 18
10:00

Report

Uzbekistan	21–108	Lebanon
Scoring by quarter: 2–27, 3–30, 14–29, 2–22
Pts: Muratov 8 Rebs: Akramov 2 Asts: 0		Pts: Salem 25; Rebs: Kourjian 2 Asts: Salem, Abou Jaoude 1

Khanh Hoa Sports Hall, Nha Trang
Referees: Yoji Fujigaki (JPN), Le Viet Duc (VIE), Ilham Burhanudin (INA)

October 18
19:00

Report

South Korea	73–70	Iraq
Scoring by quarter: 13–19, 21–11, 11–28, 28–12
Pts: Kim N.H. 25; Rebs: Lee W.J., Kim G.C. 1 Asts: Lee W.J., Yun Y.B. 1		Pts: Jassim 21; Rebs: Abdullah 1 Asts: 0

Khanh Hoa Sports Hall, Nha Trang
Referees: Fedor Dmitriev (BLR), Arnolfo Bermeo (PHI), Herman (INA)

October 19
9:00

Report

Iraq	100–32	Uzbekistan
Scoring by quarter: 33–6, 26–7, 16–8, 25–11
Pts: Fadhel 21; Rebs: 0 Asts: Majeed, Fadhel, Abdullah 1		Pts: Muratov 11; Rebs: Jahangirov 2 Asts: Bokhodirov 2

Khanh Hoa Sports Hall, Nha Trang
Referees: Shigeyuki Arisawa (JPN), Herman (INA), Le Chuong Giang (VIE)

October 19
17:00

Report

Lebanon	65–91	South Korea
Scoring by quarter: 10–34, 13–19, 17–24, 25–14
Pts: Hadidian 22; Rebs: El-Kaissi, Salem 1 Asts: El-Kaissi, Al-Agha 1		Pts: Heo H. 23; Rebs: Won J.H., Heo H. 1 Asts: Heo H., Park I.T. 1

Khanh Hoa Sports Hall, Nha Trang
Referees: Perry Stothart (CAN), Abdulrahman Al-Amri (KSA), Rafael Britanico (PHI)

October 20
11:00

Report

Uzbekistan	29–120	South Korea
Scoring by quarter: 4–34, 6–18, 10–28, 9–40
Pts: Bokhodirov 11; Rebs: Zimoveyskiy, Ivashov 3 Asts: Zimoveyskiy 5		Pts: Kim G.C. 16; Rebs: Kim Y., Shin M.C., Kim G.M. 4 Asts: Lee W.J., Won J.H. 5

Khanh Hoa Sports Hall, Nha Trang
Referees: Abdulrahman Al-Amri (KSA), Ilham Burhanudin (INA), Bang Nguyen Khac (VIE)

October 20
17:00

Report

Lebanon	75–68	Iraq
Scoring by quarter: 14–23, 18–5, 27–21, 16–19
Pts: Hadidian 28; Rebs: Hadidian 7 Asts: Salem 5		Pts: Hameed 17; Rebs: Muayad 3 Asts: Abdul-Qader, Jassim 3

Khanh Hoa Sports Hall, Nha Trang
Referees: Fedor Dmitriev (BLR), Rafael Britanico (PHI), Shigeyuki Arisawa (JPN)

=== Group C ===
Team	Pld	W	L	PF	PA	PD	Pts
Japan	2	2	0	205	91	+114	4
Saudi Arabia	2	1	1	121	133	−12	3
Qatar	2	0	2	102	204	−102	2
Iran	0	0	0	0	0	0	0

October 18
8:00

Report

Saudi Arabia	36–86	Japan
Scoring by quarter: 8–20, 9–23, 12–21, 7–22
Pts: Hawsawi 13; Rebs: Four players 1 Asts: Musallam 1		Pts: Shirato 18; Rebs: Sugiura 2 Asts: Shinkawa, Shirato, Sugiura 1

Khanh Hoa Sports Hall, Nha Trang
Referees: Huang Yung-chu (TPE), Zanim Mohd Hashim (IND), Chan Wai Seong (MAS)

October 18
17:00

Iran	vs.	Qatar
Cancelled

Khanh Hoa Sports Hall, Nha Trang

October 19
11:00

Japan	vs.	Iran
Cancelled

Khanh Hoa Sports Hall, Nha Trang

October 19
13:00

Report

Qatar	47–85	Saudi Arabia
Scoring by quarter: 17–34, 6–21, 8–21, 16–9
Pts: Dawoud 15; Rebs: Al-Ahmad 1 Asts: 0		Pts: Sakar 29; Rebs: Al-Tamar 1 Asts: 0

Khanh Hoa Sports Hall, Nha Trang
Referees: Chen Ying-cheng (TPE), Nael Al-Sarhan (IRQ), Nicolas El-Maalouf (LIB)

October 20
9:00

Saudi Arabia	vs.	Iran
Cancelled

Khanh Hoa Sports Hall, Nha Trang

October 20
21:00

Report

Japan	119–55	Qatar
Scoring by quarter: 45–11, 18–9, 25–18, 31–17
Pts: Yamamoto 22; Rebs: Shinkawa 2 Asts: Kaneko, Kakiuchi 3		Pts: Abdelkawy 24; Rebs: Saad, Dawoud 2 Asts: Saad 2

Khanh Hoa Sports Hall, Nha Trang
Referees: Chan Wai Seong (MAS), Manoj Subbayya Kotian (IND), Huang Yung-chu (TPE)

=== Group D ===
Team	Pld	W	L	PF	PA	PD	Pts
Philippines	2	2	0	204	55	+149	4
Indonesia	2	1	1	105	154	−49	3
Vietnam	2	0	2	86	186	−100	2

October 18
15:00

Report

Vietnam	61–75	Indonesia
Scoring by quarter: 12–25, 13–13, 14–24, 22–13
Pts: Nguyen D.T. 17; Rebs: Nguyen V.H., Phan M.G. 2 Asts: 0		Pts: Abraham 18; Rebs: Istiadi, Ramadhan 4 Asts: Abraham 1

Khanh Hoa Sports Hall, Nha Trang
Referees: Rabee Al-Masri (LIB), Chen Ying-cheng (TPE), Nael Al-Sarhan (IRQ)

October 19
19:00

Report

Indonesia	30–93	Philippines
Scoring by quarter: 9–27, 4–29, 9–22, 8–15
Pts: Abraham 9 Rebs: Istiadi, Ramadhan 2 Asts: 0		Pts: Alejandro, Lao 15; Rebs: Six players 1 Asts: Lao 1

Khanh Hoa Sports Hall, Nha Trang
Referees: Song Yanping (CHN), Chan Wai Seong (MAS), Choi Moon-Shik (KOR)

October 20
19:00

Report

Philippines	111–25	Vietnam
Scoring by quarter: 32–11, 27–6, 24–5, 28–3
Pts: Rivero 20; Rebs: Rivero, Diputado 2 Asts: Ramos, Lao, Asilum 3		Pts: Nguyen X.H.T., J. Tran 5 Rebs: J. Tran 3 Asts: Nguyen X.H.T., J. Tran, Nguyen V.H. 1

Khanh Hoa Sports Hall, Nha Trang
Referees: Perry Stothart (CAN), Yong Wai Chong (MAS), Sung Ki-Jun (KOR)

== Second round ==
- The results and the points of the matches between the same teams that were already played during the preliminary round shall be taken into account for the second round.

=== Group E ===
Team	Pld	W	L	PF	PA	PD	Pts	Tiebreaker
China	5	5	0	384	196	+188	10	
South Korea	5	4	1	361	335	+26	9	
Lebanon	5	2	3	320	382	−62	7	1–0
Iraq	5	2	3	329	369	−40	7	0–1
India	5	1	4	297	341	−44	6	1–0
Chinese Taipei	5	1	4	298	366	−68	6	0–1

October 22
11:00

Report

Chinese Taipei	59–79	South Korea
Scoring by quarter: 12–22, 14–18, 17–23, 16–16
Pts: Lu K.S. 13; Rebs: Huang C.Y., Chen C.J. 1 Asts: Lu K.S., Pan S.T. 2		Pts: Kim G.C. 18; Rebs: Heo H., Park I.T. 1 Asts: Four players 3

Khanh Hoa Sports Hall, Nha Trang
Referees: Yong Wai Chong (MAS), Herman (INA), Ravshan Ganiev (UZB)

October 22
13:00

Report

India	65–77	Lebanon
Scoring by quarter: 13–17, 18–17, 16–29, 18–14
Pts: L. Singh 16; Rebs: Sangwan, Satyawan, A. Singh 1 Asts: Kumar 5		Pts: Salem 22; Rebs: Wehbe 1 Asts: Zeinoun 8

Khanh Hoa Sports Hall, Nha Trang
Referees: Perry Stothart (CAN), Le Viet Duc (VIE), Arnolfo Bermeo (PHI)

October 22
15:00

Report

China	84–41	Iraq
Scoring by quarter: 22–10, 19–11, 28–10, 25–10
Pts: Zhao J.W 24; Rebs: Lai J.H, Zhou Q. 2 Asts: Zhao J.W 4		Pts: Jassim 13; Rebs: Four players 1 Asts: Abdul-Qader 3

Khanh Hoa Sports Hall, Nha Trang
Referees: Yoji Fujigaki (JPN), Chan Wai Seong (MAS), Abdulrahman Al-Amri (KSA)

October 23
9:00

Report

Lebanon	42–88	China
Scoring by quarter: 5–22, 15–32, 13–12, 9–22
Pts: Salem 12; Rebs: Al-Agha, Salem 2 Asts: Abou Jaoude 3		Pts: Zhou Q. 16; Rebs: Lai J.H 3 Asts: Yu D.H. 4

Khanh Hoa Sports Hall, Nha Trang
Referees: Fedor Dmitriev (BLR), Yoji Fujigaki (JPN), Rafael Britanico (PHI)

October 23
11:00

Report

Iraq	78–73 (OT)	Chinese Taipei
Scoring by quarter: 20–13, 14–16, 18–19, 15–19, Overtime: 11–6
Pts: Jassim 24; Rebs: Raadi, Muayad, Hameed 2 Asts: Raadi 3		Pts: Pan S.T. 15; Rebs: Pan S.T. 3 Asts: Liu J.H., Pan S.T. 3

Khanh Hoa Sports Hall, Nha Trang
Referees: Shigeyuki Arisawa (JPN), Ilham Burhanudin (INA), Ravshan Ganiev (UZB)

October 23
13:00

Report

South Korea	76–68	India
Scoring by quarter: 16–14, 15–20, 16–13, 29–21
Pts: Heo H. 31; Rebs: Kim G.C. 4 Asts: Lee W.J. 7		Pts: Bhamara 41; Rebs: Bhamara 6 Asts: L. Singh, Kumar 3

Khanh Hoa Sports Hall, Nha Trang
Referees: Perry Stothart (CAN), Yong Wai Chong (MAS), Abdulrahman Al-Amri (KSA)

October 24
9:00

Report

India	64–72	Iraq
Scoring by quarter: 15–14, 15–26, 19–15, 15–17
Pts: Bhamara 32; Rebs: Sangwan 5 Asts: A. Singh 5		Pts: Hameed 27; Rebs: Hameed 5 Asts: Hussein 3

Khanh Hoa Sports Hall, Nha Trang
Referees: Yoji Fujigaki (JPN), Arnolfo Bermeo (PHI), Herman (INA)

October 24
11:00

Report

Chinese Taipei	70–61	Lebanon
Scoring by quarter: 15–20, 16–14, 22–14, 17–13
Pts: Lu K.S. 24; Rebs: Pan S.T., Chen P.L. 3 Asts: Wang I.F., Pan S.T. 3		Pts: Zeinoun, El-Kaissi, Hadidian 10; Rebs: Assaf, Hadidian 2 Asts: Salem, Daaboul 2

Khanh Hoa Sports Hall, Nha Trang
Referees: Perry Stothart (CAN), Rafael Britanico (PHI), Ilham Burhanudin (INA)

October 24
13:00

Report

China	73–42	South Korea
Scoring by quarter: 20–10, 18–5, 20–12, 15–15
Pts: Zhou Q. 19; Rebs: Heng Y.F, Zhou Q. 2 Asts: Zhao J.W 9		Pts: Kim N.H. 13; Rebs: Kim M.K. 4 Asts: Lee W.J., Heo H. 3

Khanh Hoa Sports Hall, Nha Trang
Referees: Fedor Dmitriev (BLR), Shigeyuki Arisawa (JPN), Le Viet Duc (VIE)

=== Group F ===
Team	Pld	W	L	PF	PA	PD	Pts
Philippines	5	5	0	494	197	+297	10
Japan	5	4	1	451	256	+195	9
Indonesia	5	3	2	278	350	−72	8
Saudi Arabia	5	2	3	291	356	−65	7
Qatar	5	1	4	253	434	−181	6
Vietnam	5	0	5	241	415	−174	5

October 22
17:00

Report

Japan	97–36	Vietnam
Scoring by quarter: 29–4, 23–2, 29–15, 16–15
Pts: Baba 17; Rebs: Kakiuchi 4 Asts: Kakiuchi 7		Pts: J. Tran 9 Rebs: J. Tran 2 Asts: Nguyen X.H.T. 4

Khanh Hoa Sports Hall, Nha Trang
Referees: Zanim Mohd Hashim (IND), Rabee Al-Masri (LIB), Nael Al-Sarhan (IRQ)

October 22
19:00

Report

Saudi Arabia	65–70	Indonesia
Scoring by quarter: 14–10, 13–15, 17–20, 21–25
Pts: Sakar 18; Rebs: Al-Thalabi 5 Asts: Musallam 5		Pts: Kosasih 20; Rebs: Kosasih 5 Asts: Indraprasto 9

Khanh Hoa Sports Hall, Nha Trang
Referees: Fedor Dmitriev (BLR), Huang Yung-chu (TPE), Yang Hongfeng (CHN)

October 22
21:00

Report

Qatar	28–107	Philippines
Scoring by quarter: 6–36, 4–20, 10–29, 8–22
Pts: Dawoud 10; Rebs: Al-Ahmad 2 Asts: Saad 2		Pts: Cani, Heading 15; Rebs: Rivero 4 Asts: Javelosa, Ramos 5

Khanh Hoa Sports Hall, Nha Trang
Referees: Nicolas El-Maalouf (LIB), Manoj Subbayya Kotian (IND), Chen Ying-cheng (TPE)

October 23
15:00

Report

Vietnam	66–69 (OT)	Qatar
Scoring by quarter: 14–13, 16–23, 17–5, 9–15, Overtime: 10–13
Pts: J. Tran 23; Rebs: Nguyen V.H. 6 Asts: Nguyen X.H.T. 7		Pts: Abdelkawy 30; Rebs: Abdelkawy 3 Asts: Dawoud 7

Khanh Hoa Sports Hall, Nha Trang
Referees: Yang Hongfeng (CHN), Choi Moon-Shik (KOR), Huang Yung-chu (TPE)

October 23
17:00

Report

Indonesia	46–77	Japan
Scoring by quarter: 9–19, 9–25, 13–28, 15–5
Pts: Abraham 13; Rebs: Fahdani 2 Asts: Yogia 5		Pts: Shirato 21; Rebs: Chikui 2 Asts: Kaneko 7

Khanh Hoa Sports Hall, Nha Trang
Referees: Nael Al-Sarhan (IRQ), Song Yanping (CHN), Rabee Al-Masri (LIB)

October 23
19:00

Report

Philippines	100–42	Saudi Arabia
Scoring by quarter: 28–12, 25–15, 23–10, 24–5
Pts: Rivero 17; Rebs: Alejandro, Go, Asilum 1 Asts: Alejandro, Asilum 7		Pts: Sakar 11; Rebs: Musallam 2 Asts: Mobarki, Musallam, Barnawi 2

Khanh Hoa Sports Hall, Nha Trang
Referees: Sung Ki-Jun (KOR), Chen Ying-cheng (TPE), Zanim Mohd Hashim (IND)

October 24
15:00

Report

Saudi Arabia	63–53	Vietnam
Scoring by quarter: 13–20, 18–14, 13–10, 19–9
Pts: Sakar 32; Rebs: Al-Tamar, Barnawi 2 Asts: Barnawi 5		Pts: Nguyen M.T. 18; Rebs: Nguyen V.H., Nguyen D.T. 3 Asts: Nguyen X.H.T. 4

Khanh Hoa Sports Hall, Nha Trang
Referees: Manoj Subbayya Kotian (IND), Yang Hongfeng (CHN), Chen Ying-cheng (TPE)

October 24
17:00

Report

Qatar	54–57	Indonesia
Scoring by quarter: 16–17, 9–17, 17–13, 12–10
Pts: Saad 27; Rebs: Saad 4 Asts: Abdelkawy 4		Pts: Abraham 13; Rebs: Kosasih 3 Asts: Indraprasto, Yogia 4

Khanh Hoa Sports Hall, Nha Trang
Referees: Choi Moon-Shik (KOR), Chan Wai Seong (MAS), Nicolas El-Maalouf (LIB)

October 24
19:00

Report

Japan	72–83	Philippines
Scoring by quarter: 22–21, 14–27, 21–22, 15–13
Pts: Sugiura 30; Rebs: Baba 5 Asts: Baba 4		Pts: Alejandro 36; Rebs: Alejandro, Ramos 2 Asts: Four players 3

Khanh Hoa Sports Hall, Nha Trang
Referees: Rabee Al-Masri (LIB), Sung Ki-Jun (KOR), Song Yanping (CHN)

== Classification 13th–14th ==
October 22
9:00

Report

Malaysia	78–30	Uzbekistan
Scoring by quarter: 11–6, 20–11, 21–5, 26–8
Pts: Keng E.H. 20; Rebs: Tong J.X., Lee K.F., Ng K.X. 3 Asts: Sim Y.W. 2		Pts: Muratov 12; Rebs: Muratov 2 Asts: Ovanesov, Jahangirov 1

Khanh Hoa Sports Hall, Nha Trang
Referees: Song Yanping (CHN), Sung Ki-Jun (KOR), Bang Nguyen Khac (VIE)

== Classification 9th–12th ==
Semifinals
October 26
India	107
Vietnam	40
October 26
Chinese Taipei	125
Qatar	37

9th place
October 27
India	60
Chinese Taipei	61
11th place
October 27
Vietnam	58
Qatar	59

=== Semifinals ===
October 26
9:00

Report

India	107–40	Vietnam
Scoring by quarter: 29–11, 24–3, 29–5, 25–21
Pts: L. Singh, A. Singh 20; Rebs: A. Singh 5 Asts: A. Singh 7		Pts: Nguyen D.T. 10; Rebs: Nguyen V.H. 3 Asts: Nguyen X.H.T., Nguyen D.T. 2

Khanh Hoa Sports Hall, Nha Trang

October 26
11:00

Report

Chinese Taipei	125–37	Qatar
Scoring by quarter: 29–7, 19–12, 40–7, 37–11
Pts: Hsieh T.R. 25; Rebs: Hsieh T.R. 3 Asts: Yeh W.C. 7		Pts: Saad 16; Rebs: Saad 4 Asts: Saad 3

Khanh Hoa Sports Hall, Nha Trang
Referees: Ravshan Ganiev (UZB), Nael Al-Sarhan (IRQ), Yoji Fujigaki (JPN)

=== 11th place ===
October 27
9:00

Report

Vietnam	58–59	Qatar
Scoring by quarter: 5–13, 15–21, 20–18, 18–7
Pts: Nguyen D.T. 20; Rebs: Nguyen V.H. 5 Asts: Do D.M. 5		Pts: Abdelkawy 21; Rebs: Saad 7 Asts: Al-Abidi, Abdelkawy 3

Khanh Hoa Sports Hall, Nha Trang
Referees: Chan Wai Seong (MAS), Choi Moon-Shik (KOR), Arnolfo Bermeo (PHI)

=== 9th place ===
October 27
11:00

Report

India	60–61	Chinese Taipei
Scoring by quarter: 16–11, 18–21, 8–17, 18–12
Pts: Bhamara 29; Rebs: Bhamara 5 Asts: A. Singh 9		Pts: Wang I.F. 17; Rebs: Huang C.Y. 4 Asts: Wang I.F., Pan S.T. 5

Khanh Hoa Sports Hall, Nha Trang
Referees: Shigeyuki Arisawa (JPN), Le Chuong Giang (VIE), Abdulrahman Al-Amri (KSA)

== Final round ==
Quarterfinals
October 26
Japan	71
Lebanon	52
October 26
Saudi Arabia	19
China	100
October 26
South Korea	107
Indonesia	48
October 26
Iraq	69
Philippines	82

Semifinals
October 27
Japan	43
China	82
October 27
South Korea	67
Philippines	58

Final
October 28
China	92
South Korea	52
3rd place
October 28
Japan	94
Philippines	81

Semifinals
October 27
Lebanon	76
Saudi Arabia	43
October 27
Indonesia	38
Iraq	99

5th place
October 28
Lebanon	60
Iraq	76
7th place
October 28
Saudi Arabia	47
Indonesia	52

=== Quarterfinals ===
October 26
13:00

Report

Japan	71–52	Lebanon
Scoring by quarter: 25–8, 23–22, 17–11, 6–11
Pts: Sugiura 24; Rebs: Sugiura 5 Asts: Baba 7		Pts: Salem 24; Rebs: Al-Agha, Salem 4 Asts: Zeinoun, Salem, Abou Jaoude 2

Khanh Hoa Sports Hall, Nha Trang
Referees: Fedor Dmitriev (BLR), Herman (INA), Yong Wai Chong (MAS)

October 26
15:00

Report

Saudi Arabia	19–100	China
Scoring by quarter: 5–32, 2–21, 2–31, 10–16
Pts: Sakar 6 Rebs: Al-Tamar 2 Asts: Barnawi 2		Pts: Heng Y.F. 16; Rebs: Heng Y.F. 5 Asts: Xu Z.Y. 8

Khanh Hoa Sports Hall, Nha Trang
Referees: Sung Ki-Jun (KOR), Huang Yung-chu (TPE), Manoj Subbayya Kotian (IND)

October 26
17:00

Report

South Korea	107–48	Indonesia
Scoring by quarter: 19–4, 26–12, 28–17, 34–15
Pts: Shin M.C. 22; Rebs: Kim G.C. 4 Asts: Lee W.J. 7		Pts: Ramadhan 13; Rebs: Fahdani 4 Asts: Indraprasto, Airawan, Abraham 3

Khanh Hoa Sports Hall, Nha Trang
Referees: Chen Ying-cheng (TPE), Nicolas El-Maalouf (LIB), Zanim Mohd Hashim (IND)

October 26
19:00

Report

Iraq	69–82	Philippines
Scoring by quarter: 9–30, 25–21, 18–11, 17–20
Pts: Hameed 20; Rebs: Fadhel 3 Asts: Abdul-Qader 7		Pts: Javelosa 14; Rebs: Javelosa 5 Asts: Alejandro, Javelosa 5

Khanh Hoa Sports Hall, Nha Trang
Referees: Perry Stothart (CAN), Song Yanping (CHN), Chan Wai Seong (MAS)

=== Semifinals 5th–8th ===
October 27
13:00

Report

Lebanon	76–43	Saudi Arabia
Scoring by quarter: 21–12, 17–12, 22–8, 16–11
Pts: Salem 17; Rebs: Al-Agha 6 Asts: Zeinoun 5		Pts: Sakar 18; Rebs: Al-Thalabi 3 Asts: Musallam 3

Khanh Hoa Sports Hall, Nha Trang
Referees: Le Viet Duc (VIE), Ravshan Ganiev (UZB), Manoj Subbayya Kotian (IND)

October 27
15:00

Report

Indonesia	38–99	Iraq
Scoring by quarter: 10–25, 10–29, 11–17, 7–28
Pts: Kosasih 10; Rebs: Kosasih 6 Asts: Kosasih, Abraham 1		Pts: Jassim, Saad 18; Rebs: Hameed 3 Asts: Abdul-Qader 8

Khanh Hoa Sports Hall, Nha Trang
Referees: Yang Hongfeng (CHN), Bang Nguyen Khac (VIE), Huang Yung-chu (TPE)

=== Semifinals ===
October 27
17:00

Report

Japan	43–82	China
Scoring by quarter: 14–30, 13–14, 6–16, 10–22
Pts: Sugiura 19; Rebs: Sugiura 3 Asts: Kaneko, Kakiuchi 4		Pts: Zhao J.W., Yan H.X. 18; Rebs: Yu D.H., Yan H.X. 3 Asts: Zhao J.W. 7

Khanh Hoa Sports Hall, Nha Trang
Referees: Fedor Dmitriev (BLR), Zanim Mohd Hashim (IND), Herman (INA)

October 27
19:00

Report

South Korea	67–58	Philippines
Scoring by quarter: 19–21, 18–8, 21–21, 9–8
Pts: Heo H. 22; Rebs: Kim G.C. 8 Asts: Heo H. 6		Pts: Alejandro, Asilum 12; Rebs: Javelosa 11; Asts: Cani 6

Khanh Hoa Sports Hall, Nha Trang
Referees: Perry Stothart (CAN), Rabee Al-Masri (LIB), Yong Wai Chong (MAS)

=== 7th place ===
October 28
9:00

Report

Saudi Arabia	47–52	Indonesia
Scoring by quarter: 14–11, 10–8, 10–13, 13–20
Pts: Barnawi 17; Rebs: Al-Malalah, Barnawi 4 Asts: Hawsawi, Al-Tamar 3		Pts: Fahdani 17; Rebs: Fahdani 3 Asts: Yogia 5

Khanh Hoa Sports Hall, Nha Trang
Referees: Nicolas El-Maalouf (LIB), Nael Al-Sarhan (IRQ), Le Chuong Giang (VIE)

=== 5th place ===
October 28
11:00

Report

Lebanon	60–76	Iraq
Scoring by quarter: 13–24, 17–10, 9–16, 21–26
Pts: Salem 19; Rebs: Al-Agha 4 Asts: Zeinoun 8		Pts: Hameed 17; Rebs: Raadi, Muayad, Hameed 2 Asts: Hussein 6

Khanh Hoa Sports Hall, Nha Trang
Referees: Rafael Britanico (PHI), Sung Ki-Jun (KOR), Yang Hongfeng (CHN)

=== 3rd place ===
October 28
13:00

Report

Japan	94–81	Philippines
Scoring by quarter: 11–16, 21–15, 30–11, 32–39
Pts: Kaneko 25; Rebs: Baba 13; Asts: Kaneko 5		Pts: Cani, Lao 16; Rebs: Heading 8 Asts: Cani 4

Khanh Hoa Sports Hall, Nha Trang
Referees: Song Yanping (CHN), Chen Ying-cheng (TPE)

=== Final ===
October 28
15:00

Report

China	92–52	South Korea
Scoring by quarter: 15–8, 25–15, 25–19, 27–10
Pts: Zhou Q. 43; Rebs: Zhou Q. 19; Asts: Zhao J.W. 6		Pts: Heo H. 19; Rebs: Heo H. 6 Asts: Seven players 1

Khanh Hoa Sports Hall, Nha Trang
Referees: Fedor Dmitriev (BLR), Perry Stothart (CAN), Yoji Fujigaki (JPN)

== Final standing ==
Qualified for the 2012 FIBA Under-17 World Championship

Rank	Team	Record
1st place, gold medalist(s)	China	9–0
2nd place, silver medalist(s)	South Korea	7–2
3rd place, bronze medalist(s)	Japan	6–2
4	Philippines	6–2
5	Iraq	5–4
6	Lebanon	4–5
7	Indonesia	4–4
8	Saudi Arabia	2–6
9	Chinese Taipei	4–4
10	India	3–5
11	Qatar	2–5
12	Vietnam	0–7
13	Malaysia	1–3
14	Uzbekistan	0–4

== Awards ==
2011 Asian Under-16 champions

China
Second title
