= Bangladesh Basketball Federation =

Sports governing body

- Abbreviation: BBF
- Formation: 1972
- Headquarters: Dhaka, Bangladesh
- Region served: Bangladesh
- Official language: Bengali

Bangladesh Basketball Federation is the national organization for basketball and is responsible for governing the sport in Bangladesh. Dr Shamim Newaz is the president and Major Mohammad Atiqul Hafeez (Retd.) is the general secretary of the federation.

== History ==
Bangladesh Basketball Federation was established in 1972 under the National Sports Council. It is an associate member of FIBA (Fédération Internationale de Basketball Amateur). The federation owns the Dhanmondi Wooden Floor Gymnasium, the only active basketball gymnasium in Bangladesh. It is set to lose the ground to the proposed Sheikh Kamal Sports Complex.

Bangladesh Olympics Association suspended Sabuj Miah, national women's basketball team coach, over allegations him assaulting a female player in November 2019.
