= Saudi Arabia women's national basketball team =

Saudi Arabia
- FIBA ranking: 82 ▼3 (14 September 2026)
- Joined FIBA: 1964
- FIBA zone: FIBA Asia
- National federation: Saudi Basketball Federation

Olympic Games
- Appearances: None

World Cup
- Appearances: None

Asia Cup
- Appearances: None
Home	Away

The Saudi Arabia women's national basketball team represents Saudi Arabia in international competitions and friendly matches. It is managed by the Saudi Basketball Federation.

Saudi Arabia made the international headlines after it sent a team to the 2019 Special Olympics World Summer Games where its team won the gold medal.

== See also ==
- Saudi Arabia men's national basketball team
