= Yusei Sugiura =

Japanese basketball player (born 1995)

Yusei Sugiura 杉浦佑成
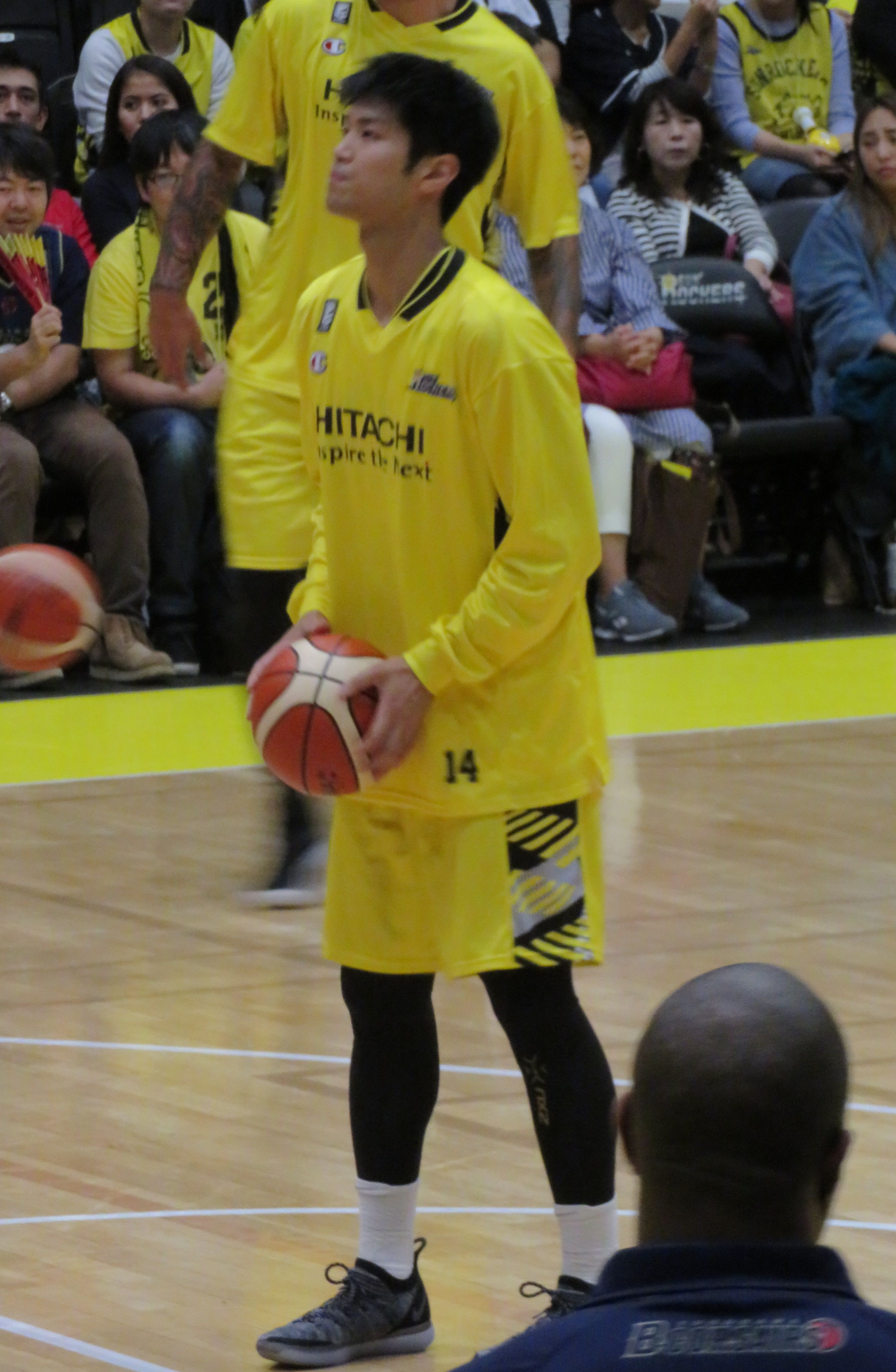
- Sugiura in 2018

No. 9 – Shiga Lakes
- Position: Small forward
- League: B.League, FIBA 3X3

Personal information
- Born: June 24, 1995 (age 31) Setagaya-ku, Tokyo
- Listed height: 6 ft 5 in (1.96 m)
- Listed weight: 209 lb (95 kg)

Career information
- High school: Fukuoka University Ohori High School (Chūō-ku, Fukuoka)
- College: University of Tsukuba
- Playing career: 2017–present

Career history
- 2017–2020: Sun Rockers Shibuya
- 2020–2021: Shimane Susanoo Magic
- 2021–2022: San-en NeoPhoenix
- 2022–present: Shiga Lakes
Medals
Representing Japan
FIBA Asia Under-16 Championship
Bronze medal – third place	2011 Nha Trang	Team

Yusei Sugiura (杉浦 佑成, Sugiura Yūsei; born June 24, 1995) is a Japanese professional basketball player who plays for the Shiga Lakes of the B.League in Japan. He also plays for Japan men's national 3x3 team.

== Non-FIBA Events statistics ==
Year	Team	GP	GS	MPG	FG%	3P%	FT%	RPG	APG	SPG	BPG	PPG
2015	Universiade Japan	6		6.55	.417	.500	.750	1.3	0.5	0.3	0.0	3.0
2017	Universiade Japan	7		16.11	.319	.100	.333	2.6	0.6	0.6	0.1	4.6
2015-17	Average	13		11.54	.339	.214	.636	2.0	0.5	0.5	0.1	3.8

== Career statistics ==
Legend
GP	Games played	GS	Games started	MPG	Minutes per game
FG%	Field goal percentage	3P%	3-point field goal percentage	FT%	Free throw percentage
RPG	Rebounds per game	APG	Assists per game	SPG	Steals per game
BPG	Blocks per game	PPG	Points per game	**Bold**	Career high

=== Regular season ===
Year	Team	GP	GS	MPG	FG%	3P%	FT%	RPG	APG	SPG	BPG	PPG
2016-17	Shibuya	6	0	4.29	.231	.111	.000	0.5	0.0	0.0	0.0	1.2
2017-18	Shibuya	23	3	9.48	.327	.324	.857	0.7	0.3	0.26	0.0	2.3
2018-19	Shibuya	60	41	16.42	.351	.372	.706	1.2	0.7	0.3	0.03	4.8

=== Early cup games ===
Year	Team	GP	GS	MPG	FG%	3P%	FT%	RPG	APG	SPG	BPG	PPG
2018	Shibuya	3	1	23.03	.276	.100	1.000	1.7	0.3	0	0	7.7

== Personal ==
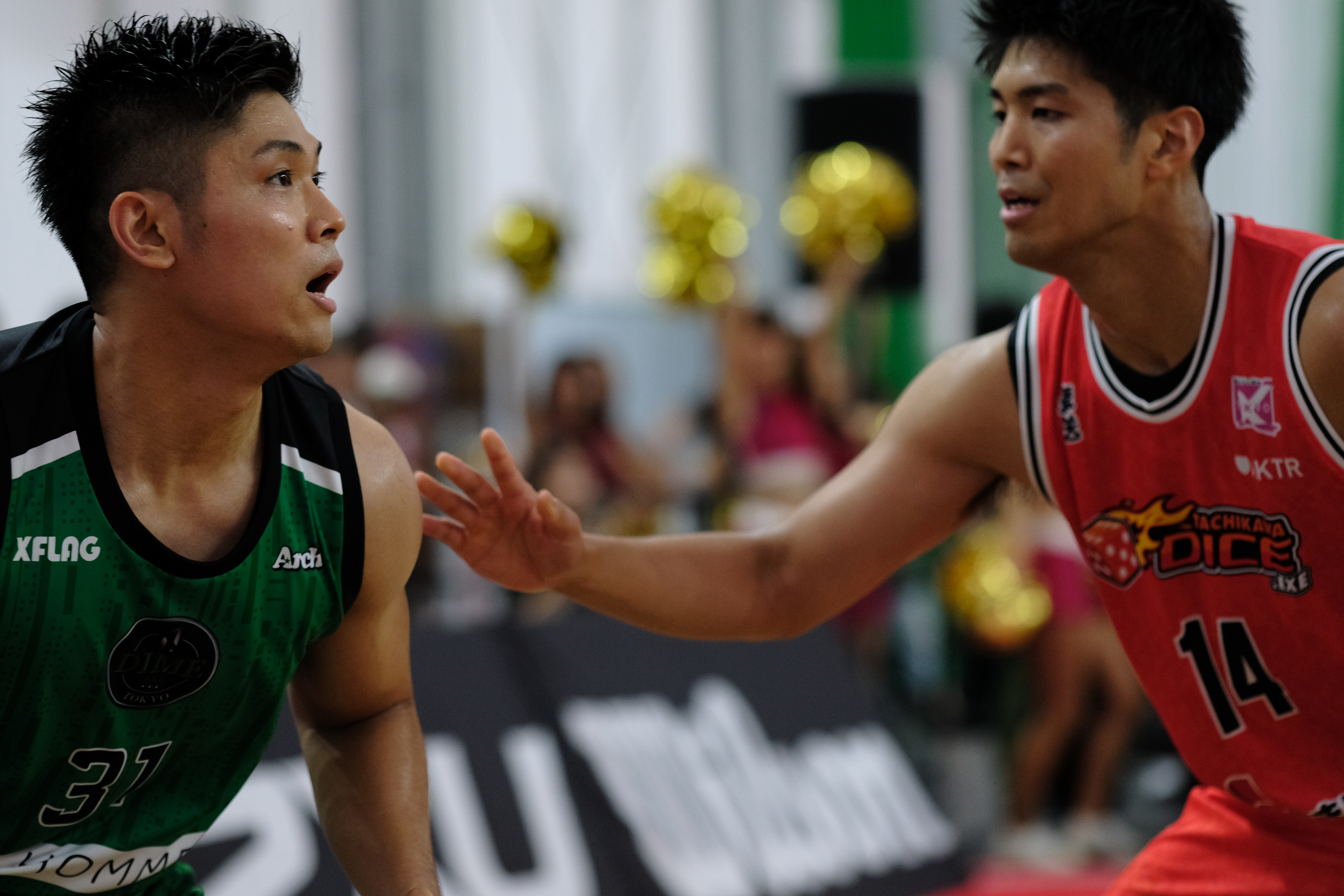
with Tachikawa Dice

His mother is from Akita Prefecture. He is a nephew of Kimikazu Suzuki, a basketball head coach.
