= Saudi Arabian Basketball Federation =

- Abbreviation: SBF
- Formation: 1964; 62 years ago
- Location: Riyadh, Saudi Arabia
- President: Dr Ghassan Yousuf Tashkandi
- Secretary General: Abdulelah Bin Shail
- Affiliations: FIBA; FIBA Asia; Saudi Arabia Olympic Committee
- Website: saudi.basketball

The Saudi Arabian Basketball Federation (Arabic: الاتحاد العربي السعودي لكرة السلة) is the governing body of basketball in Saudi Arabia.

The federation founded in 1964, represents basketball with public authorities as well as with national and international sports organizations and as such with Saudi Arabia in international competitions. It also defends the moral and material interests of Basketball in Saudi Arabia. It is affiliated with FIBA and FIBA Asia.

The federation also in control with the Saudi Arabia national basketball team, 3x3 national team and the Saudi Arabia women's national basketball team.

== Structure ==
- Dr Ghassan Tashkandi, President
- Yassar Mukhtar, Vice President
- Homoud Al Malki, Board Member
- Aljawhara Fallatah, Board Member
- Mohammed Al Zain, Board Member
- Dareen Sabban, Board Member
- Abdulelah Bin Sail, Executive Manager

== Committees ==
- Competitions and Statistics Committee
- Technical Committee
- 3x3 Committee
- Referees Committee
- Public affairs and Mass Participation Committee
- Media Committee
- Strategic Committee
- Women Affairs Committee
- Players Committee
- Discipline Committee
- Appeal Committee

== Competitions ==
- Saudi Basketball League
- SBF Cup
- 3x3 Cup
