= FIBA U16 Asia Cup =

Under-16 basketball championship

- Most recent season or competition: 2025 FIBA U16 Asia Cup
- Formerly: FIBA Asia Under-16 Championship, FIBA U16 Asian Championship
- Sport: Basketball
- Founded: 2009; 17 years ago
- First season: 2009
- Organizing body: FIBA Asia
- No. of teams: 16
- Countries: FIBA Asia and FIBA Oceania member nations
- Continent: Asia and Oceania
- Most recent champion: Australia (4th title)
- Most titles: Australia (4 titles)
- Qualification: FIBA Under-17 Basketball World Cup
- Related competitions: FIBA U18 Asia Cup
- Website: www.fiba.basketball/history

The FIBA U16 Asia Cup, formerly known as the FIBA Asia Under-16 Championship and FIBA U16 Asian Championship, is a biennial international under-16 men's basketball competition organized by FIBA Asia.

The event also serves as a qualification tournament for the FIBA Under-17 Basketball World Cup, where the top four finishers automatically qualify.

== Summary ==
Year	Hosts	Final			Third place match		
Year	Hosts	Champions	Score	Runners-up	Third place	Score	Fourth place
2009; Details	(Malaysia); Johor Bahru	China	104–69	South Korea	Iran	83–73; OT	Philippines
2011; Details	(Vietnam); Nha Trang	China	92–52	South Korea	Japan	94–81	Philippines
2013; Details	(Iran); Tehran	China	85–78	Philippines	Japan	85–72	Chinese Taipei
2015; Details	(Indonesia); Jakarta	South Korea	78–69	Chinese Taipei	China	80–58	Japan
2017; Details	(China); Foshan	Australia	91–67	China	New Zealand	76–60	Philippines
2019 (Note: It was originally scheduled to be held in 2020 but cancelled due to the COVID-19 pandemic.); Details	(Lebanon); Beirut	Cancelled due to the COVID-19 pandemic in Asia					
2022; Details	(Qatar); Doha	Australia	94–63	Japan	New Zealand	89–62	Lebanon
2023; Details	(Qatar); Doha	Australia	79–76	New Zealand	China	87–59	Philippines
2025; Details	(Mongolia); Ulaanbaatar	Australia	85–58	China	New Zealand	93–92	Japan
2027; Details	(Jordan); Amman		–			–	

== Medal table ==
Rank	Nation	Gold	Silver	Bronze	Total
1	Australia	4	0	0	4
2	China	3	2	2	7
3	South Korea	1	2	0	3
4	New Zealand	0	1	3	4
5	Japan	0	1	2	3
6	Chinese Taipei	0	1	0	1
6	Philippines	0	1	0	1
8	Iran	0	0	1	1
Totals (8 entries)		8	8	8	24

== Participation details ==
Team	(Malaysia) 2009	(Vietnam) 2011	(Iran) 2013	(Indonesia) 2015	(China) 2017	(Qatar) 2022	(Qatar) 2023	(Mongolia) 2025	(Jordan) 2027	Total
Australia					1st	1st	1st	1st		4
Bahrain	12th		8th	12th		13th	15th	8th		6
Bangladesh				15th						1
China	1st	1st	1st	3rd	2nd		3rd	2nd		7
Chinese Taipei	5th	9th	4th	2nd	9th			7th		6
Hong Kong			13th	14th	11th					3
India	10th	10th	11th	13th	13th	5th	9th	16th		8
Indonesia		7th		10th		11th		13th		4
Iran	3rd		6th		7th	8th	6th	6th		6
Iraq		5th		9th						2
Japan	6th	3rd	3rd	4th	6th	2nd	5th	4th		8
Jordan	8th		10th				8th		Q	4
Kazakhstan	9th		7th			10th	13th	12th		5
Kuwait	13th			12th		12th				3
Lebanon		6th		6th	8th	4th	11th	9th		6
Macau					12th					1
Malaysia	11th	13th	9th	11th	10th		12th	11th		7
Mongolia								15th		1
New Zealand					3rd	3rd	2nd	3rd		4
Philippines	4th	4th	2nd	5th	4th	7th	4th	10th		8
Qatar		11th				9th	7th			3
Saudi Arabia	15th	8th					14th	14th		4
Singapore	14th									1
South Korea	2nd	2nd	5th	1st	5th	6th	10th	5th		8
Sri Lanka							16th			1
Syria	7th		12th							2
Thailand	16th		13th	7th						3
Uzbekistan		14th								1
Vietnam		12th								1
Total	16	14	14	15	13	13	16	16	16	

== General statistics ==
All-time statistics, as of the 2025 FIBA U16 Asia Cup.

Team	Played	Won	Lost	%Won
Australia	23	23	0	100.00%
Bahrain	36	10	26	27.78%
Bangladesh	4	0	4	0.00%
China	52	47	5	90.38%
Chinese Taipei	44	28	16	63.64%
Hong Kong	11	2	9	18.18%
India	43	16	27	37.21%
Indonesia	22	7	15	31.82%
Iran	41	24	17	58.54%
Iraq	17	9	8	52.94%
Japan	57	37	20	64.91%
Jordan	22	8	14	36.36%
Kazakhstan	25	8	17	32.00%
Kuwait	19	5	14	26.32%
Lebanon	38	17	21	44.74%
Macau	3	0	3	0.00%
Malaysia	37	12	25	32.43%
Mongolia	3	0	3	0.00%
New Zealand	24	18	6	75.00%
Philippines	55	35	20	63.64%
Qatar	18	6	12	33.33%
Saudi Arabia	21	3	18	14.29%
Singapore	7	2	5	28.57%
South Korea	58	41	17	70.69%
Syria	16	6	10	37.50%
Thailand	18	4	14	22.22%
Uzbekistan	4	0	4	0.00%
Vietnam	7	0	7	0.00%
Sri Lanka	3	0	3	0.00%

== Under-17 World Cup record ==
Nation	(Germany) 2010	(Lithuania) 2012	(United Arab Emirates) 2014	(Spain) 2016	(Argentina) 2018	(Spain) 2022	(Turkey) 2024	(Turkey) 2026	(Greece) 2028	Total
Australia	Part of FIBA Oceania				6th	6th	15th	3rd		4
China	7th	7th	7th	10th	15th	–	13th	10th		7
Chinese Taipei	–	–	–	14th	–	–	–	–		1
Japan	–	–	14th	–	–	14th	–	14th		3
Lebanon	–	–	–	–	–	16th	–	–		1
New Zealand	Part of FIBA Oceania				14th	12th	4th	12th		4
Philippines	–	–	15th	–	13th	–	16th	–		3
South Korea	12th	11th	–	8th	–	–	–	–		3
United Arab Emirates	–	–	16th	–	–	–	–	–		1
Total	2	2	4	3	4	4	4	4	4	

== See also ==
- FIBA Asia Cup
- FIBA U18 Asia Cup
- FIBA U16 Women's Asia Cup
- FIBA U17 World Cup
