= Afghanistan women's national basketball team =

Afghanistan
- FIBA ranking: NR (18 March 2026)
- Joined FIBA: 1968
- FIBA zone: FIBA Asia
- National federation: National Basketball Association of Afghanistan (NBAA)

Olympic Games
- Appearances: None

World Cup
- Appearances: None

Asia Cup
- Appearances: None
Home	Away

Afghanistan women's national basketball team was formed by US troops after the invasion of Afghanistan in 2001. The Afghanistan women's national basketball team was run by the Afghan Olympic Committee. The team was disbanded following the 2021 Taliban takeover of Afghanistan.

== See also ==
- Afghanistan men's national basketball team
