= FIBA Asia =

Basketball governing authority in Asia

- Formation: 1960
- Type: Sports federation
- Headquarters: Beirut, Lebanon
- Members: 44 member associations
- Official language: English
- President: (India) Kempa Govindaraj
- Website: fiba.basketball/asia

FIBA Asia is a zone within the International Basketball Federation (FIBA) which contains Asian FIBA member associations.

== Sub-zones ==
The 44 member associations have been assigned to six sub-zones:

1. Central Asia Basketball Association (CABA) – five member associations
2. East Asia Basketball Association (EABA) – eight member associations
3. Gulf Basketball Association (GBA) – six member associations
4. South Asia Basketball Association (SABA) – eight member associations
5. Southeast Asia Basketball Association (SEABA) – ten member associations
6. West Asia Basketball Association (WABA) – seven member associations

== Board ==
Bold indicates members of the FIBA Central Board.

FIBA Asia President
(India) **Kempa Govindaraj**
Chairman
(China) **Yao Ming**
Vice Presidents
(Lebanon) Akram Halabi (1st Vice President)
(Philippines) **Alfredo Panlilio** (2nd Vice President)
Treasurer
(United Arab Emirates) Abdullatif Al Fardan Al Uaimi
Member of Gender in Minority
(China) Xu Lan
Sub-zone Representatives
(Bangladesh) Arbhijit Sarker (SABA)
(Japan) **Yuko Mitsuya** (EABA)
(Kazakhstan) Abay Alpamyssov (CABA)
(Saudi Arabia) Ghassan Tashkandi (GBA)
(Syria) Tarif Koutrach (WABA)
Vacant (SEABA) (Note: Danny Kosasih of Indonesia was selected as the SEABA Zone Representative on 22 May 2023. However, he died on 5 September 2024.)
FIBA Executive Director for Asia
(Lebanon) Hagop Khajirian

== Members ==
Country	Association	National teams	FIBA affiliation
Central Asia (CABA)
Kazakhstan	Kazakhstan Basketball Federation	Men's; U18/19; U16/17; Women's; U18/19; U16/17	1992
Kyrgyzstan	Kyrgyz Basketball Federation	Men's; U18/19; U16/17; Women's; U18/19; U16/17	1992
Tajikistan	Tajikistan Basketball Federation	Men's; U18/19; U16/17; Women's; U18/19; U16/17	1994
Turkmenistan	Turkmenistan Basketball Federation	Men's; U18/19; U16/17; Women's; U18/19; U16/17	1998
Uzbekistan	Basketball Federation of Uzbekistan	Men's; U18/19; U16/17; Women's; U18/19; U16/17	1992
East Asia (EABA)
China	Chinese Basketball Association	Men's; U18/19; U16/17; Women's; U18/19; U16/17	1936 (Note: CBA unilaterally declared its "withdrawal" in 1958, returned in 1974)
Chinese Taipei	Chinese Taipei Basketball Association	Men's; U18/19; U16/17; Women's; U18/19; U16/17	1952 (Note: Membership terminated in 1974, reinstated in 1981)
Hong Kong	Basketball Association of Hong Kong, China	Men's; U18/19; U16/17; Women's; U18/19; U16/17	1957
Japan	Japan Basketball Association	Men's; U18/19; U16/17; Women's; U18/19; U16/17	1936
Macau	Macau–China Basketball Association	Men's; U18/19; U16/17; Women's; U18/19; U16/17	1979
Mongolia	Mongolian Basketball Association	Men's; U18/19; U16/17; Women's; U18/19; U16/17	2000
North Korea	Amateur Basketball Association of DPR of Korea	Men's; U18/19; U16/17; Women's; U18/19; U16/17	1947
South Korea	Korea Basketball Association	Men's; U18/19; U16/17; Women's; U18/19; U16/17	1947
Persian Gulf (GBA)
Bahrain	Bahrain Basketball Association	Men's; U18/19; U16/17; Women's; U18/19; U16/17	1975
Kuwait	Kuwait Basketball Association	Men's; U18/19; U16/17; Women's; U18/19; U16/17	1959
Oman	Oman Basketball Association	Men's; U18/19; U16/17; Women's; U18/19; U16/17	1987
Qatar	Qatar Basketball Federation	Men's; U18/19; U16/17; Women's; U18/19; U16/17	1977
Saudi Arabia	Saudi Arabian Basketball Federation	Men's; U18/19; U16/17; Women's; U18/19; U16/17	1964
United Arab Emirates	United Arab Emirates Basketball Association	Men's; U18/19; U16/17; Women's; U18/19; U16/17	1976
South Asia (SABA)
Afghanistan	Afghanistan National Basketball Federation (ANBF)	Men's; U18/19; U16/17; Women's; U18/19; U16/17	1968
Bangladesh	Bangladesh Basketball Federation	Men's; U18/19; U16/17; Women's; U18/19; U16/17	1978
Bhutan	Bhutan Basketball Federation	Men's; U18/19; U16/17; Women's; U18/19; U16/17	1983
India	Basketball Federation of India	Men's; U18/19; U16/17; Women's; U18/19; U16/17	1936
Maldives	Maldives Basketball Association	Men's; U18/19; U16/17; Women's; U18/19; U16/17	1997
Nepal	Nepal Basketball Association	Men's; U18/19; U16/17; Women's; U18/19; U16/17	2000
Pakistan	Pakistan Basketball Federation	Men's; U18/19; U16/17; Women's; U18/19; U16/17	1958
Sri Lanka	Sri Lanka Basketball Federation	Men's; U18/19; U16/17; Women's; U18/19; U16/17	1959
Southeast Asia (SEABA)
Brunei	Brunei Basketball Association	Men's; U18/19; U16/17; Women's; U18/19; U16/17	1970
Cambodia	Cambodia Basketball Federation	Men's; U18/19; U16/17; Women's; U18/19; U16/17	1958
Indonesia	Indonesian Basketball Association (PERBASI)	Men's; U18/19; U16/17; Women's; U18/19; U16/17	1954
Laos	Fédération de Basketball du Laos	Men's; U18/19; U16/17; Women's; U18/19; U16/17	1965
Malaysia	Malaysia Basketball Association	Men's; U18/19; U16/17; Women's; U18/19; U16/17	1957
Myanmar	Myanmar Basketball Federation	Men's; U18/19; U16/17; Women's; U18/19; U16/17	1949
Philippines	Samahang Basketbol ng Pilipinas	Men's; U18/19; U16/17; Women's; U18/19; U16/17	1936
Singapore	Basketball Association of Singapore	Men's; U18/19; U16/17; Women's; U18/19; U16/17	1954
Thailand	Basketball Sport Association of Thailand	Men's; U18/19; U16/17; Women's; U18/19; U16/17	1953
Vietnam	Vietnam Basketball Federation	Men's; U18/19; U16/17; Women's; U18/19; U16/17	1952
West Asia (WABA)
Iran	Iran Basketball Federation	Men's; U18/19; U16/17; Women's; U18/19; U16/17	1947
Iraq	Iraqi Basketball Association	Men's; U18/19; U16/17; Women's; U18/19; U16/17	1948
Jordan	Jordan Basketball Federation	Men's; U18/19; U16/17; Women's; U18/19; U16/17	1957
Lebanon	Fédération Libanaise de Basketball	Men's; U18/19; U16/17; Women's; U18/19; U16/17	1947
Palestine	Palestinian Basketball Federation	Men's; U18/19; U16/17; Women's; U18/19; U16/17	1963
Syria	Syrian Basketball Federation	Men's; U18/19; U16/17; Women's; U18/19; U16/17	1947
Yemen	Yemen Basketball Association (YBA)	Men's; U18/19; U16/17; Women's; U18/19; U16/17	1971

== Tournaments ==
=== Basketball ===
National teams:

- FIBA Asia Cup – since 2017, also includes FIBA Oceania members
- FIBA Women's Asia Cup – since 2017, also includes FIBA Oceania members
- FIBA U18 Asia Cup - since 2018, also includes FIBA Oceania members
- FIBA U18 Women's Asia Cup - since 2018, also includes FIBA Oceania members
- FIBA U16 Asia Cup - since 2018, also includes FIBA Oceania members
- FIBA U16 Women's Asia Cup - since 2017, also includes FIBA Oceania members
- FIBA 3x3 Asia Cup
- FIBA 3x3 U17 Asia Cup

Clubs:

- Basketball Champions League Asia
- Women's Basketball League Asia
- East Asia Super League
- West Asia Super League

Defunct

- FIBA Asia Challenge
- FIBA Asia Under-20 Championship
- FIBA Asia Under-20 Championship for Women

== Title holder ==
=== Men ===
Tournament	Year	Champion	Title	Runner-up	Next edition
National teams
FIBA Asia Cup	2025	Australia	3rd	China	2029
FIBA Under-18 Asia Cup	2026	Australia	3rd	China	2028
FIBA Under-16 Asia Cup	2025	Australia	4th	China	2027
FIBA 3x3 Asia Cup	2026	New Zealand	1st	South Korea	2027
FIBA 3x3 Under-18 Asia Cup	2022	Japan	2nd	India	TBD
Club teams
Basketball Champions League Asia	2025	(Japan) Utsunomiya Brex	1st	(Lebanon) Al Riyadi	2026
East Asia Super League	2025–26	(Japan) Utsunomiya Brex	1st	(Chinese Taipei) Taoyuan Pauian Pilots	2026–27
West Asia Super League	2025–26	(Lebanon) Al Riyadi	3rd	(Lebanon) Sagesse	2026–27

=== Women ===
Tournament	Division	Year	Champion	Title	Runner-up	Next edition
National teams
FIBA Women's Asia Cup	Division A	2025	Australia	1st	Japan	2027
FIBA Women's Asia Cup	Division B	2025	Chinese Taipei	1st	Iran	2027
FIBA Under-18 Women's Asia Cup	Division A	2026	Australia	3rd	Japan	2028
FIBA Under-18 Women's Asia Cup	Division B	2026	Lebanon	1st	Kazakhstan	2028
FIBA Under-16 Women's Asia Cup	Division A	2025	Australia	4th	New Zealand	2027
FIBA Under-16 Women's Asia Cup	Division B	2025	India	2nd	Iran	2027
FIBA 3x3 Asia Cup (women)		2026	Australia	6th	Philippines	2027
FIBA 3x3 Under-18 Asia Cup (women)		2022	Japan	1st	Malaysia	TBD
Club teams
Women's Basketball League Asia		2026	(Japan) Denso Iris	1st	(China) Sichuan Yuanda Meile	2027

== World rankings ==
Men's rankings (as of 1 September 2026)
Asia*	FIBA	±	National team	Points
1	7	Steady	Australia	822
2	22	Steady	Japan	550.7
3	25	Steady	New Zealand	515.2
4	28	▼2	Iran	472
5	30	Steady	China	469.1
6	33	▼2	Lebanon	461.8
7	40	▼1	Philippines	397.3
8	41	Steady	Jordan	387.1
9	57	Steady	South Korea	282.7
10	64	▲1	Saudi Arabia	244.7
11	71	▼3	Chinese Taipei	210
12	73	▲1	Syria	200.1
13	74	▲2	Qatar	185.7
14	76	▼1	India	170.8
15	77	▲3	Brunei	166.8
16	78	▼1	Guam	160.2
17	81	▲5	Kazakhstan	151.7
18	82	▼1	Iraq	149.5
19	92	▲2	Indonesia	121.3
20	94	▲3	Thailand	117.1
21	97	▲7	Palestine	107
22	104	▲7	United Arab Emirates	97.3
23	105	▲3	Mongolia	97.1
24	110	▲8	Kuwait	87
25	113	▲8	Malaysia	83.1
26	115	▲8	Hong Kong	82.4
27	126	▲4	Sri Lanka	69.5
28	129	Steady	Maldives	66.8
29	130	▲1	Vietnam	64.5
30	131	▼3	Samoa	64.4
31	132	▲1	Singapore	63.9
32	135	▲6	Oman	54.7
33	136	▼2	Tahiti	53.4
34	138	▼2	Tonga	52.2
35	139	▼2	Bangladesh	51.4
36	140	▲2	Fiji	50.2
37	142	▼3	American Samoa	49.1
38	143	Steady	Nepal	45.8
39	147	▼2	Macau	37
40	149	▼2	Cook Islands	25.6
41	153	Steady	Kyrgyzstan	12.3
42	154	▼3	Papua New Guinea	8.9
43	155	▼3	Solomon Islands	8
44	156	▼3	New Caledonia	6.4
45	157	▼3	Vanuatu	5.4
46	158	Steady	Federated States of Micronesia	3.1
47	159	Steady	Palau	2.7
*Local rankings based on FIBA ranking points

Women's rankings (as of 14 September 2026)
Asia*	FIBA	±	National team	Points
1	5	▼2	Australia	723.7
2	8	▼3	China	711.7
3	9	▲1	Japan	572.9
4	14	▲1	South Korea	475.1
5	21	Steady	New Zealand	280.6
6	30	▲9	Philippines	259.9
7	39	▼3	Chinese Taipei	221.6
8	44	▼3	Lebanon	191.4
9	47	▼3	Iran	182.6
10	59	▼2	Indonesia	143.8
11	61	▼3	Thailand	140.6
12	62	▼2	India	136.7
13	68	▼3	Jordan	120.4
14	69	▼2	Kazakhstan	115.1
15	72	▼2	Mongolia	112
16	80	▼4	Malaysia	100.5
17	84	Steady	Syria	81.3
18	89	Steady	Uzbekistan	75.1
19	101	▼1	Cook Islands	60.7
20	104	Steady	Maldives	52.7
21	105	Steady	Hong Kong	51
22	110	Steady	Nepal	42.6
23	114	▲1	Tahiti	33.1
24	115	▲1	Sri Lanka	32.2
25	116	▲1	Kyrgyzstan	29.8
*Local rankings based on FIBA ranking points

=== Team of the Year ===
Teams ranking in the top four – Men's
Year	First	Second	Third	Fourth
2025	Australia	Japan	New Zealand	Iran
2024	Australia	Japan	New Zealand	Iran
2023	Australia	Iran	New Zealand	China
2022	Australia	Iran	New Zealand	China
2021	Australia	Iran	New Zealand	China
2020	Australia	Iran	New Zealand	China
2019	Australia	Iran	China	Philippines
2018	Australia	Iran	China	Philippines
2017	Australia	China	New Zealand	Iran
2016	Australia	China	Iran	New Zealand
2015	Australia	China	Iran	New Zealand
2014	Australia	China	New Zealand	Iran
2013	Australia	China	New Zealand	Iran
2012	Australia	China	New Zealand	Iran
2011	Australia	China	New Zealand	Iran

Teams ranking in the top four – Women's
Year	First	Second	Third	Fourth
2025	Australia	China	Japan	South Korea
2024	China	Australia	Japan	South Korea
2023	China	Australia	Japan	South Korea
2022	Australia	China	Japan	South Korea
2021	Australia	China	Japan	South Korea
2020	Australia	China	Japan	South Korea
2019	Australia	China	Japan	South Korea
2018	Australia	China	Japan	South Korea
2017	Australia	China	Japan	South Korea
2016	Australia	China	South Korea	Japan
2015	Australia	China	South Korea	Japan
2014	Australia	China	South Korea	Japan
2013	Australia	China	South Korea	Japan
2012	Australia	China	South Korea	Japan
2011	Australia	China	South Korea	Japan

== Performance record ==
- Doesn't include classification rounds

1st	Gold Medal
2nd	Silver Medal
3rd	Bronze Medal
SF	Semifinals
FR	Final round
QF	Quarterfinals
R16	Round of 16
RD2	Second round
RD1	Preliminary round
WD	Withdrew
DQ	Disqualified
	Host team

=== Olympics ===
Men
Nation	36 (Nazi Germany) (18)	48 (United Kingdom) (23)	52 (Finland) (23)	56 (Australia) (15)	60 (Italy) (16)	64 (Japan) (16)	68 (Mexico) (16)	72 (West Germany) (16)	76 (Canada) (12)	80 (Soviet Union) (12)	84 (United States) (12)	88 (South Korea) (12)	92 (Spain) (12)	96 (United States) (12)	00 (Australia) (12)	04 (Greece) (12)	08 (China) (12)	12 (United Kingdom) (12)	16 (Brazil) (12)	20 (Japan) (12)	24 (France) (12)	Years
China	**RD2**; 15th	**RD2**; 18th							**WD**	**WD**	**RD1**; 10th	**RD1**; 11th	**RD1**; 12th	**QF**; 8th	**RD1**; 10th	**QF**; 8th	**QF**; 8th	**RD1**; 12th	**RD1**; 12th			11
Chinese Taipei				**RD1**; 11th																		1
India										**RD1**; 12th												1
Iran		**RD1**; 14th															**RD1**; 11th			**RD1**; 12th		3
Iraq		**RD1**; 22nd																				1
Japan	**RD1**; 9th			**RD1**; 10th	**RD1**; 15th	**RD1**; 10th		**RD1**; 14th	**RD1**; 11th											**RD1**; 11th	**RD1**; 11th	8
South Korea		**QF**; 8th		**RD1**; 14th		**RD1**; 16th	**RD1**; 14th					**RD1**; 9th		**RD1**; 12th								6
Philippines	**QF**; 5th	**RD1**; 12th	**R16**; 9th	**QF**; 7th	**RD1**; 11th		**RD1**; 13th	**RD1**; 13th														7
Singapore				**RD1**; 13th																		1
Thailand				**RD1**; 15th																		1

Women
Nation	76 (Canada) (12)	80 (Soviet Union) (12)	84 (United States) (12)	88 (South Korea) (12)	92 (Spain) (12)	96 (United States) (12)	00 (Australia) (12)	04 (Greece) (12)	08 (China) (12)	12 (United Kingdom) (12)	16 (Brazil) (12)	20 (Japan) (12)	24 (France) (12)	Years
China			**3rd**	**RD1**; 6th	**2nd**	**RD1**; 9th		**RD1**; 9th	**SF**; 4th	**QF**; 6th	**RD1**; 10th	**QF**; 5th	**RD1**; 9th	10
Japan	**FR**; 5th					**QF**; 7th		**RD1**; 10th			**QF**; 8th	**2nd**	**RD1**; 12th	6
South Korea			**2nd**	**RD1**; 7th		**RD1**; 10th	**SF**; 4th	**RD1**; 12th	**QF**; 8th			**RD1**; 10th		7

=== World Cup ===
Men
Nation	50 (Argentina) (10)	54 (Brazil) (12)	59 (Chile) (13)	63 (Brazil) (13)	67 (Uruguay) (13)	70 (Socialist Federal Republic of Yugoslavia) (13)	74 (Puerto Rico) (14)	78 (Philippines) (14)	82 (Colombia) (13)	86 (Spain) (24)	90 (Argentina) (16)	94 (Canada) (16)	98 (Greece) (16)	02 (United States) (16)	06 (Japan) (24)	10 (Turkey) (24)	14 (Spain) (24)	19 (China) (32)	2023 (Philippines) (Japan) (Indonesia) (32)	2027 (Qatar) (32)	Years
China								**RD1**; 11th	**RD1**; 12th	**RD2**; 9th	**RD1**; 14th	**RD2**; 8th		**RD2**; 12th	**R16**; 15th	**R16**; 16th		**RD1**; 24th	**RD1**; 29th		10
Iran																**RD1**; 19th	**RD1**; 20th	**RD1**; 23rd	**RD1**; 31st		4
Japan				**RD1**; 13th	**RD1**; 11th								**RD1**; 14th		**RD1**; 20th			**RD1**; 31st	**RD1**; 19th		6
Jordan																**RD1**; 23rd		**RD1**; 28th	**RD1**; 32nd		3
South Korea						**RD1**; 11th		**RD1**; 13th		**RD1**; 22nd	**RD1**; 15th	**RD1**; 13th	**RD1**; 16th				**RD1**; 23rd	**RD1**; 26th			8
Lebanon														**RD1**; 16th	**RD1**; 18th	**RD1**; 21st			**RD1**; 23rd		4
Malaysia										**RD1**; 24th											1
Philippines		**FR**; 3rd	**QF**; 8th	**DQ**			**RD1**; 13th	**FR**; 8th		**WD**							**RD1**; 21st	**RD1**; 32nd	**RD1**; 24th		7
Qatar															**RD1**; 24th					**TBD**; TBD	2

== Australia and New Zealand ==
Although the national basketball federations of Australia and New Zealand remain members of FIBA Oceania, their national teams have competed in FIBA Asia competitions since 2017. This change was part of a restructuring of the international competition system and did not involve the two federations formally joining FIBA Asia.

== See also ==
- Sports in Asia
