= 2022 FIBA Under-17 Basketball World Cup squads =

This article shows the rosters of all participating teams at the 2022 FIBA Under-17 Basketball World Cup in Spain.

Squad was announced on FIBA website.

== Group A ==
=== Canada ===
A 12-player squad was announced on 30 June 2022.

Canada men's national under-17 basketball team roster
Players
Coaches

Pos.	No.	Name	Age – Date of birth	Height	Club
PF	1	Christian Nitu	16 – 30 October 2005	2.11 m (6 ft 11 in)	(Canada) Whitby
PF	4	Stephen Osei	17 – 4 March 2005	2.06 m (6 ft 9 in)	(Canada) Toronto
G	5	Jacob Theodosiou	16 – 4 October 2005	1.93 m (6 ft 4 in)	(Canada) Waterloo
SG	6	Ishan Sharma	16 – 15 July 2005	1.96 m (6 ft 5 in)	(Canada) Milton
SF	8	Hudson Ward	16 – 12 July 2005	2.01 m (6 ft 7 in)	(Canada) Leduc
C	10	Char Yeiy	16 – 25 April 2006	2.03 m (6 ft 8 in)	(Canada) London
PG	11	Mikkel Tyne	17 – 2 May 2005	1.78 m (5 ft 10 in)	(Canada) Brampton
PF	13	Jaion Pitt	16 – 12 February 2006	1.98 m (6 ft 6 in)	(Canada) Norwood
G	15	Osezojie Baraka Okojie	17 – 15 June 2005	1.91 m (6 ft 3 in)	(Canada) Caledon
G	17	Felix Kossaras	17 – 21 May 2005	1.96 m (6 ft 5 in)	(Canada) Montreal
C	22	Olivier Rioux	16 – 2 February 2006	2.36 m (7 ft 9 in)	(Canada) Terrebonne
F	23	Jovan Milicevic	17 – 10 May 2005	2.11 m (6 ft 11 in)	(Canada) Toronto

Head coach

Patrick Tatham

Assistant coach(es)

Chris Cheng
Jason Dawkins

=== France ===
A 12-player squad was announced on 30 June 2022.

France men's national under-17 basketball team roster
Players
Coaches

Pos.	No.	Name	Age – Date of birth	Height	Club
SF	1	Pacôme Dadiet	16 – 27 July 2005	2.00 m (6 ft 7 in)	(France) Paris Basketball
PG	6	Théo Pichard	17 – 8 April 2005	1.96 m (6 ft 5 in)	(France) Centre Fédéral de Basket-ball
SF	9	Noah Penda	17 – 7 January 2005	1.99 m (6 ft 6 in)	(France) Centre Fédéral de Basket-ball
SG	10	Ilane Fibleuil	17 – 26 June 2005	1.96 m (6 ft 5 in)	(France) Centre Fédéral de Basket-ball
PG	11	Illan Pietrus	17 – 20 June 2005	1.89 m (6 ft 2 in)	(France) SIG Strasbourg
PF	12	Mohamed Diawara	17 – 29 April 2005	2.04 m (6 ft 8 in)	(France) Paris Basketball
C	14	Wilson Jacques	17 – 10 April 2005	2.13 m (7 ft 0 in)	(France) Centre Fédéral de Basket-ball
C	20	Alexandre Dam Sarr	17 – 26 April 2005	2.13 m (7 ft 0 in)	(United States) Overtime Elite
PF	21	Maxim Logué	16 – 18 July 2005	2.02 m (6 ft 8 in)	(France) Centre Fédéral de Basket-ball
SG	23	Killian Malwaya	16 – 4 August 2005	1.95 m (6 ft 5 in)	(France) ASVEL Basket
SG	26	Elidjah-Gabriel Lamart	16 – 9 August 2005	1.95 m (6 ft 5 in)	(France) Cholet Basket
SF	35	Zaccharie Risacher	17 – 8 April 2005	2.02 m (6 ft 8 in)	(France) ASVEL Basket

Head coach

Bernard Faure

Assistant coach(es)

Éric Kehlhoffner
Christophe Simon

=== New Zealand ===
A 12-player squad was announced on 20 June 2022.

New Zealand men's national under-17 basketball team roster
Players
Coaches

Pos.	No.	Name	Age – Date of birth	Height	Club
F	3	William Passi	17 – 10 February 2005	1.98 m (6 ft 6 in)	(New Zealand) Counties Manukau Basketball
G	9	George Grant	17 – 2 February 2005	1.89 m (6 ft 2 in)	(New Zealand) Basketball Otago
G	10	Kaia Berridge	16 – 29 December 2005	1.91 m (6 ft 3 in)	(New Zealand) Tauranga City Basketball
C	11	Julius Halaifonua	16 – 9 May 2006	2.14 m (7 ft 0 in)	(New Zealand) Harbour Basketball
F	12	Nic Book	16 – 2 January 2006	2.03 m (6 ft 8 in)	(New Zealand) Canterbury Basketball
SG	13	George Turner	17 – 9 April 2005	1.95 m (6 ft 5 in)	(New Zealand) Counties Manukau Basketball
G	15	Phoenix Trego	17 – 23 January 2005	1.86 m (6 ft 1 in)	New Zealand
F	21	Will Shortt	17 – 5 January 2005	2.00 m (6 ft 7 in)	(New Zealand) Basketball Auckland
G	23	Hunter Trego	17 – 23 January 2005	1.86 m (6 ft 1 in)	New Zealand
C	25	Kalid Petzer	17 – 15 June 2005	2.05 m (6 ft 9 in)	(New Zealand) Basketball Auckland
SG	42	Brody Perry	17 – 6 January 2005	1.90 m (6 ft 3 in)	(New Zealand) Franklin Basketball
F	50	Dante Matakatea	17 – 14 March 2005	1.96 m (6 ft 5 in)	(New Zealand) Basketball Auckland

Head coach

Darron Larsen

Assistant coach(es)

Chris Tupu
Jack Williamson

=== Serbia ===
A 12-player squad was announced on 30 June 2022.

Serbia men's national under-17 basketball team roster
Players
Coaches

Pos.	No.	Name	Age – Date of birth	Height	Club
G	4	Đorđe Ćurčić	17 – 17 April 2005	1.95 m (6 ft 5 in)	(Serbia) KK Borac Čačak
F	5	Asim Đulović	16 – 30 July 2005	1.98 m (6 ft 6 in)	(Serbia) KK Dynamic
F	6	Bogoljub Marković	16 – 12 July 2005	2.04 m (6 ft 8 in)	(Serbia) KK Mega Basket
G	7	Andrej Mušicki	17 – 14 February 2005	1.86 m (6 ft 1 in)	(Serbia) KK Mega Basket
F	8	Mitar Bošnjaković	15 – 24 August 2006	1.99 m (6 ft 6 in)	(Spain) Real Madrid Baloncesto
F	9	Pavle Nikolić	16 – 4 September 2005	2.00 m (6 ft 7 in)	(Serbia) KK Borac Čačak
G	16	Ognjen Stanković	17 – 19 March 2005	1.97 m (6 ft 6 in)	(Serbia) KK Mega Basket
F	23	Danilo Dožić	17 – 11 February 2005	2.06 m (6 ft 9 in)	(Serbia) KK Dynamic
G	31	Matija Milošević	17 – 31 May 2005	1.93 m (6 ft 4 in)	(Serbia) KK Borac Čačak
F	34	Filip Jović	17 – 1 February 2005	2.04 m (6 ft 8 in)	(Serbia) KK Dynamic
C	35	Lazar Gačić	17 – 31 January 2005	2.12 m (6 ft 11 in)	(Serbia) KK Crvena zvezda
C	70	Viktor Mikić	16 – 14 September 2005	2.10 m (6 ft 11 in)	(Serbia) KK Dynamic

Head coach

Dragoljub Avramović

Assistant coach(es)

Tomislav Tomović
Marko Spasić

== Group B ==
=== Dominican Republic ===
A 12-player squad was announced on 27 June 2022.

Dominican Republic men's national under-17 basketball team roster
Players
Coaches

Pos.	No.	Name	Age – Date of birth	Height	Club
SG	0	Gabriele Cambria	16 – 4 July 2005	1.90 m (6 ft 3 in)	(Dominican Republic) Santo Domingo
G	1	Danny Carbuccia	16 – 23 February 2006	1.85 m (6 ft 1 in)	(United States) Archbishop Stepinac High School
SF	2	Rodrigo Aybar	17 – 26 May 2005	1.90 m (6 ft 3 in)	(United States) NBA Academy Latin America
F	3	Jalen Pichardo	17 – 14 May 2005	2.03 m (6 ft 8 in)	(United States) Overtime Elite
PG	4	Wandy Muñoz	17 – 1 February 2005	1.76 m (5 ft 9 in)	(Dominican Republic) Santiago
F	5	Ernesto Almonte	17 – 5 March 2005	1.95 m (6 ft 5 in)	(Dominican Republic) Puerto Plata
C	8	Luis Bridgewater	17 – 8 February 2005	2.03 m (6 ft 8 in)	(Dominican Republic) Santo Domingo
F	9	Jonathan Estrella Abenza	17 – 4 May 2005	1.96 m (6 ft 5 in)	(Spain) UCAM Murcia CB
C	14	Steven Solano	17 – 15 March 2005	1.90 m (6 ft 3 in)	(United States) Dominican Republic
F	21	Maylon Marte	17 – 21 April 2005	1.96 m (6 ft 5 in)	(Dominican Republic) Distrito Nacional
F	23	Luis Díaz	17 – 11 February 2005	1.91 m (6 ft 3 in)	(Dominican Republic) Distrito Nacional
G	24	Yeison Liberato	17 – 16 January 2005	1.88 m (6 ft 2 in)	(Dominican Republic) Distrito Nacional

Head coach

Jonathan Espaillat

=== Japan ===
A 12-player squad was announced on 27 June 2022.

Japan men's national under-17 basketball team roster
Players
Coaches

Pos.	No.	Name	Age – Date of birth	Height	Club
PG	4	Shuta Kajitani	17 – 2 January 2005	1.78 m (5 ft 10 in)	(Japan) Hiroshima Minami High School
SG	5	Kei Rooney	17 – 6 January 2005	1.83 m (6 ft 0 in)	(Japan) Shochi Fukaya High School
G	6	Suguru Ishiguchi	17 – 9 January 2005	1.80 m (5 ft 11 in)	(Japan) Tokai University Suwa High School
SF	7	Shuntaro Buto	17 – 4 February 2005	1.90 m (6 ft 3 in)	(Japan) Kaishi Kokusai High School
PG	8	Shuto Sakihama	17 – 8 May 2005	1.75 m (5 ft 9 in)	(Japan) Fukuoka Daiichi High School
F	9	Shawn Williams	17 – 22 May 2005	1.99 m (6 ft 6 in)	(Japan) Sendai University Meisei High School
PF	10	Yuto Kawashima	17 – 27 May 2005	2.01 m (6 ft 7 in)	(Japan) Fukuoka University Ohori High School
G	11	Eijiro Ogawa	16 – 1 October 2005	1.87 m (6 ft 2 in)	(Japan) Haguro High School
F	12	Oga Suzuki	16 – 25 November 2005	1.91 m (6 ft 3 in)	(Japan) Fukuoka University Ohori High School
SF	13	Teruchika Naito	16 – 11 January 2006	1.90 m (6 ft 3 in)	(Japan) Levanga Hokkaido
PF	14	Patrick Appeah	17 – 12 April 2005	1.96 m (6 ft 5 in)	(Japan) Fukuoka Daiichi High School
PF	15	Leon Watanabe	16 – 2 April 2006	2.04 m (6 ft 8 in)	(Japan) Fukuoka University Ohori High School

Head coach

Alejandro Martínez

Assistant coach(es)

Takayasu Fujii

=== Lithuania ===
A 12-player squad was announced on 30 June 2022.

Lithuania men's national under-17 basketball team roster
Players
Coaches

Pos.	No.	Name	Age – Date of birth	Height	Club
PG	1	Kristupas Kepežinskas	17 – 27 March 2005	1.88 m (6 ft 2 in)	(Lithuania) BC Žalgiris
SG	3	Vytautas Žygas	17 – 2 May 2005	1.97 m (6 ft 6 in)	(Lithuania) BC Žalgiris
SG	8	Justas Stonkus	16 – 31 December 2005	1.92 m (6 ft 4 in)	(Lithuania) Plungės SRC
PG	9	Nikas Stuknys	17 – 30 June 2005	1.94 m (6 ft 4 in)	(Lithuania) Panevėžio SC
C	10	Danas Kazakevičius	17 – 23 May 2005	2.07 m (6 ft 9 in)	(Germany) Baunach Young Pikes
SF	11	Augustas Navickas	16 – 15 September 2005	1.96 m (6 ft 5 in)	(Lithuania) BC Žalgiris
SF	12	Petras Padegimas	17 – 14 May 2005	2.01 m (6 ft 7 in)	(Lithuania) BC Žalgiris
C	17	Mantas Kočanas	17 – 28 June 2005	2.04 m (6 ft 8 in)	(Lithuania) BC Žalgiris
PF	23	Aleksas Bieliauskas	16 – 3 December 2005	2.06 m (6 ft 9 in)	(Lithuania) BC Žalgiris
G	24	Nojus Kulieša	17 – 13 February 2005	1.86 m (6 ft 1 in)	(Lithuania) Sostinės krepšinio mokykla
PF	36	Ernestas Matulevič	17 – 19 February 2005	2.01 m (6 ft 7 in)	(Lithuania) Sostinės krepšinio mokykla
PG	45	Deividas Žukauskas	17 – 1 March 2005	1.88 m (6 ft 2 in)	(Lithuania) KA Saulė

Head coach

Remigijus Bardauskas

Assistant coach(es)

Mindaugas Tamušauskas

=== Spain ===
A 12-player squad was announced on 29 June 2022.

Spain men's national under-17 basketball team roster
Players
Coaches

Pos.	No.	Name	Age – Date of birth	Height	Club
PG	5	Conrad Martínez	17 – 6 January 2005	1.82 m (6 ft 0 in)	(Spain) Joventut Badalona
SG	6	Lucas Marí	16 – 20 October 2005	1.96 m (6 ft 5 in)	(Spain) Valencia Basket
SG	8	Ruben Vicente	17 – 14 February 2005	1.97 m (6 ft 6 in)	(Spain) Unicaja Málaga
SF	9	Sergio de Larrea	16 – 4 December 2005	1.97 m (6 ft 6 in)	(Spain) Valencia Basket
SF	10	Bruno Vidarte	17 – 2 March 2005	2.00 m (6 ft 7 in)	(Spain) Real Madrid Baloncesto
PF	11	Alvaro Folgueiras	17 – 1 April 2005	2.02 m (6 ft 8 in)	(Spain) Unicaja Málaga
PG	12	Lucas Hernández	17 – 4 January 2005	1.92 m (6 ft 4 in)	(Spain) Casademont Zaragoza
PF	13	Izan Almansa	17 – 7 June 2005	2.07 m (6 ft 9 in)	(United States) Overtime Elite
C	14	David Barberá	17 – 17 April 2005	2.06 m (6 ft 9 in)	(Spain) Valencia Basket
C	15	Aday Mara	17 – 7 April 2005	2.20 m (7 ft 3 in)	(Spain) Casademont Zaragoza
SF	16	Hugo González	16 – 5 February 2006	1.98 m (6 ft 6 in)	(Spain) Real Madrid Baloncesto
PG	17	Abel Delicado	17 – 25 May 2005	1.86 m (6 ft 1 in)	(Spain) Real Madrid Baloncesto

Head coach

Javier Zamora

Assistant coach(es)

Jorge Sanz
Juan Gil

== Group C ==
=== Lebanon ===
A 12-player squad was announced on 30 June 2022.

Lebanon men's national under-17 basketball team roster
Players
Coaches

Pos.	No.	Name	Age – Date of birth	Height	Club
SF	00	Toni Awwad	16 – 1 February 2006	1.91 m (6 ft 3 in)	Lebanon
PG	1	Rayan Hachem	17 – 2 July 2005	1.96 m (6 ft 5 in)	(Lebanon) Hoops Club
C	5	Jean El Shamee	17 – 14 February 2005	2.06 m (6 ft 9 in)	Lebanon
SG	6	Serouj Avedissian	16 – 20 October 2005	1.83 m (6 ft 0 in)	(Lebanon) Homenetmen
PF	10	Chris El Hachem	16 – 27 August 2005	1.98 m (6 ft 6 in)	Lebanon
C	11	Nikolai Choueiri	16 – 27 April 2006	2.01 m (6 ft 7 in)	(Lebanon) Hoops Club
PG	13	Giorgio Azzi	17 – 1 May 2005	1.88 m (6 ft 2 in)	Lebanon
PF	23	Bryan Saleh	17 – 6 June 2005	2.01 m (6 ft 7 in)	(Lebanon) Sagesse
PG	24	Jad Tabbara	16 – 27 April 2006	1.78 m (5 ft 10 in)	(Lebanon) Al Riyadi
C	34	Karl Zamatta	16 – 7 May 2006	2.03 m (6 ft 8 in)	Lebanon
SF	35	Anthony Naba	16 – 15 April 2006	2.01 m (6 ft 7 in)	Lebanon
SF	72	Ray Abou Sleiman	16 – 29 May 2006	1.88 m (6 ft 2 in)	Lebanon

Head coach

Rabih Francis

Assistant coach(es)

Georges Akiki
Maroun Dib

=== Mali ===
A 12-player squad was announced on 30 June 2022.

Mali men's national under-17 basketball team roster
Players
Coaches

Pos.	No.	Name	Age – Date of birth	Height	Club
PF	0	Tiemoko Diallo	16 – 17 October 2005	2.01 m (6 ft 7 in)	Mali
PF	5	Djibril Dembélé	14 – 29 August 2007	2.04 m (6 ft 8 in)	Mali
SG	6	Diafar Silimana	16 – 17 November 2005	1.90 m (6 ft 3 in)	Mali
G	7	Ibrahim Doumbia	16 – 2 February 2006	1.83 m (6 ft 0 in)	Mali
SG	8	Souleymane Dagnon	15 – 30 August 2006	1.92 m (6 ft 4 in)	Mali
SF	9	Karamoko Keïta	16 – 1 January 2006	2.00 m (6 ft 7 in)	Mali
PF	11	Moussa Diawara	17 – 11 January 2005	2.02 m (6 ft 8 in)	Mali
G	12	Chouaybou Keïta	16 – 6 February 2006	1.85 m (6 ft 1 in)	Mali
C	21	Ladji Coulibaly	15 – 15 July 2006	2.03 m (6 ft 8 in)	Mali
G	23	Abdoul Keïta	16 – 16 February 2006	1.85 m (6 ft 1 in)	Mali
C	32	Malick Diallo	17 – 6 May 2005	2.11 m (6 ft 11 in)	(Spain) Joventut Badalona
C	34	Cheick Keïta	16 – 28 November 2005	2.06 m (6 ft 9 in)	Mali

Head coach

Mamoutou Kané

Assistant coach(es)

Ibrahim Cissé
Aissata Maiga

=== Slovenia ===
A 12-player squad was announced on 30 June 2022.

Slovenia men's national under-17 basketball team roster
Players
Coaches

Pos.	No.	Name	Age – Date of birth	Height	Club
G	4	Luka Šmitran	17 – 11 April 2005	1.89 m (6 ft 2 in)	(Slovenia) Cedevita Olimpija
G	5	Lon Ličan	17 – 31 January 2005	1.93 m (6 ft 4 in)	(Slovenia) Cedevita Olimpija
F	6	Rok Popovič	16 – 6 September 2005	2.02 m (6 ft 8 in)	(Slovenia) Cedevita Olimpija
G	7	Jan Vide	17 – 15 January 2005	1.97 m (6 ft 6 in)	(Spain) Real Madrid
G	8	Samo Vrabec	16 – 22 October 2005	1.92 m (6 ft 4 in)	(Slovenia) Nova Gorica mladi
C	9	Teodor Regoršek	16 – 12 October 2005	2.10 m (6 ft 11 in)	(Slovenia) Slovenske Konjice
G	10	Nejc Dizdarević	17 – 6 April 2005	1.92 m (6 ft 4 in)	(Slovenia) Janče
F	11	Nik Urbanija	17 – 18 May 2005	2.01 m (6 ft 7 in)	(Slovenia) Zlatorog Laško
F	12	Jure Rener	16 – 7 July 2005	2.01 m (6 ft 7 in)	(Slovenia) Helios Suns
G	13	Filip Pirš	17 – 13 March 2005	1.91 m (6 ft 3 in)	(Slovenia) Zlatorog Laško
F	14	Vid Borišek	17 – 7 March 2005	1.93 m (6 ft 4 in)	(Slovenia) Hopsi Polzela
C	15	Blaž Tratar	17 – 24 January 2005	2.01 m (6 ft 7 in)	(Slovenia) Zlatorog Laško

Head coach

Dejan Gašparin

Assistant coach(es)

Domen Zevnik

=== United States ===
A 12-player squad was announced on 22 June 2022.

United States men's national under-17 basketball team roster
Players
Coaches

Pos.	No.	Name	Age – Date of birth	Height	Club
F	4	Koa Peat	15 – 20 January 2007	2.03 m (6 ft 8 in)	(United States) Perry High School
SF	5	Karter Knox	17 – 16 May 2005	1.98 m (6 ft 6 in)	(United States) Tampa Catholic High School
PG	6	Jeremy Fears Jr.	17 – 19 April 2005	1.88 m (6 ft 2 in)	(United States) La Lumiere School
G	7	Boogie Fland	15 – 10 July 2006	1.91 m (6 ft 3 in)	(United States) Archbishop Stepinac High School
SG	8	Ian Jackson	17 – 14 February 2005	1.98 m (6 ft 6 in)	(United States) Cardinal Hayes High School
F	9	Cooper Flagg	15 – 21 December 2006	2.03 m (6 ft 8 in)	(United States) Montverde Academy
G	10	David Castillo	16 – 17 August 2005	1.85 m (6 ft 1 in)	(United States) Sunrise Christian School
F	11	Ron Holland	16 – 7 July 2005	2.03 m (6 ft 8 in)	(United States) Duncanville High School
G	12	D. J. Wagner	17 – 4 May 2005	1.90 m (6 ft 3 in)	(United States) Camden High School
F	13	Sean Stewart	17 – 17 February 2005	2.03 m (6 ft 8 in)	(United States) Montverde Academy
F	14	Asa Newell	16 – 5 October 2005	2.03 m (6 ft 8 in)	(United States) Montverde Academy
C	15	Dennis Evans III	16 – 13 July 2005	2.16 m (7 ft 1 in)	(United States) Hillcrest High School

Head coach

Sharman White

Assistant coach(es)

Eric Flannery
Stephen Turner

== Group D ==
=== Argentina ===
A 12-player squad was announced on 17 June 2022.

Argentina men's national under-17 basketball team roster
Players
Coaches

Pos.	No.	Name	Age – Date of birth	Height	Club
F	0	Santiago Bilbao	17 – 4 January 2005	1.98 m (6 ft 6 in)	(Argentina) Argentino de Junín
G	6	Tiago Drocezesky	16 – 2 September 2005	1.93 m (6 ft 4 in)	(Argentina) Bahía Basket
G	7	Drazen Sinigoj	17 – 17 March 2005	1.92 m (6 ft 4 in)	(United States) Our Lady of Mount Carmel School
SF	8	Juan Bocca	17 – 18 March 2005	1.98 m (6 ft 6 in)	(Spain) Obradoiro CAB
F	9	Máximo Lomello	17 – 9 March 2005	2.04 m (6 ft 8 in)	(Argentina) Atenas de Córdoba
G	10	Víctor Pérez	17 – 4 March 2005	1.89 m (6 ft 2 in)	(Argentina) Obras Sanitarias
F	12	Lucas Giovannetti	17 – 14 June 2005	2.01 m (6 ft 7 in)	(Spain) CB Estudiantes
PG	13	Juan Respaud	16 – 7 July 2005	1.90 m (6 ft 3 in)	(Argentina) Obras Sanitarias
F	15	Tiziano Prome	17 – 28 February 2005	2.01 m (6 ft 7 in)	(Argentina) Bahía Basket
C	18	Iván Pratto	15 – 21 January 2007	2.08 m (6 ft 10 in)	(Argentina) Unión Central de Villa María
C	24	Joaquín López	17 – 26 May 2005	2.03 m (6 ft 8 in)	(Argentina) Obras Sanitarias
C	28	Lautaro Viatri	16 – 8 September 2005	2.02 m (6 ft 8 in)	(Uruguay) Lagomar SC

Head coach

Leonardo Gutiérrez

Assistant coach(es)

Guido Fabbris
Federico Renzetti

=== Australia ===
A 12-player squad was announced on 2 July 2022.

Australia men's national under-17 basketball team roster
Players
Coaches

Pos.	No.	Name	Age – Date of birth	Height	Club
G	4	Kristian Ferronato	17 – 19 January 2005	1.92 m (6 ft 4 in)	(Australia) Victoria
G	5	Lachlan Brewer	17 – 27 April 2005	1.94 m (6 ft 4 in)	(Australia) Tasmania
G	6	Tristan Devers	17 – 2 July 2005	1.92 m (6 ft 4 in)	(Australia) Victoria
G	7	Joshua Dent	16 – 5 September 2005	1.90 m (6 ft 3 in)	(Australia) New South Wales
G	8	Kye Savage	16 – 23 July 2005	1.86 m (6 ft 1 in)	(Australia) Tasmania
G	9	Carlin Briggs	17 – 16 March 2005	1.97 m (6 ft 6 in)	(Australia) Victoria
F	10	Joshua Hughes	17 – 8 January 2005	2.06 m (6 ft 9 in)	(Australia) Queensland
C	11	Rocco Zikarsky	15 – 11 July 2006	2.17 m (7 ft 1 in)	(Australia) Queensland
G	12	Jacob Furphy	15 – 5 August 2006	1.94 m (6 ft 4 in)	(Australia) Tasmania
F	13	Roman Siulepa	15 – 9 July 2006	1.98 m (6 ft 6 in)	(Australia) Queensland
F	14	James O'Donnell	16 – 22 August 2005	2.04 m (6 ft 8 in)	(Australia) New South Wales
F	15	Austin Rapp	16 – 20 August 2005	2.04 m (6 ft 8 in)	(Australia) Victoria

Head coach

Justin Schueller

Assistant coach(es)

Greg Vanderjagt
Sam Gruggen

=== Egypt ===
A 12-player squad was announced on 30 June 2022.

Egypt men's national under-17 basketball team roster
Players
Coaches

Pos.	No.	Name	Age – Date of birth	Height	Club
SG	1	Selim Elselmy	17 – 1 January 2005	1.91 m (6 ft 3 in)	(Egypt) Sporting
PG	4	Mohammed Hussin	16 – 10 March 2006	1.82 m (6 ft 0 in)	(Egypt) Al Ahly
PF	7	Ahmed Abouelela	16 – 3 May 2006	2.01 m (6 ft 7 in)	(Egypt) Zamalek
PF	9	Omar Abdelmeguid	17 – 1 January 2005	2.06 m (6 ft 9 in)	(Egypt) Al Ittihad Alexandria
F	10	Hassan Amer	16 – 11 November 2005	2.01 m (6 ft 7 in)	(Egypt) Al Ahly
PG	11	Karim El-Gizawy	17 – 13 January 2005	1.91 m (6 ft 3 in)	(Egypt) Al Ahly
PG	12	Youssef El-Ghayesh	16 – 9 December 2005	1.88 m (6 ft 2 in)	(Egypt) Sporting
C	13	Hussein El-Maraghy	17 – 8 March 2005	2.04 m (6 ft 8 in)	(Egypt) Gezira
SF	14	Ali El-Diasty	17 – 5 June 2005	1.98 m (6 ft 6 in)	(Egypt) Gezira
SG	15	Adam El-Halawany	17 – 9 April 2005	1.91 m (6 ft 3 in)	(Egypt) Sporting
F	23	Mohamed Hussein	17 – 18 February 2005	1.98 m (6 ft 6 in)	(Egypt) Zamalek
SF	77	Seifeldin Hendawy	16 – 5 September 2005	1.98 m (6 ft 6 in)	(United States) NBA Academy Africa

Head coach

Amr Aboul Kheir

Assistant coach(es)

Ahmed El-Garhi
Haytham Gad

=== Poland ===
A 12-player squad was announced on 28 June 2022.

Poland men's national under-17 basketball team roster
Players
Coaches

Pos.	No.	Name	Age – Date of birth	Height	Club
PG	1	Kajetan Kuczawski	16 – 3 November 2005	1.86 m (6 ft 1 in)	(Poland) UKS SP 27 Katowice
SG	2	Marcin Kosiorowski	16 – 22 September 2005	1.91 m (6 ft 3 in)	(Poland) MKS Grójec
PG	3	Mateusz Samiec	17 – 14 April 2005	1.90 m (6 ft 3 in)	(Poland) Sudety Jelenia Góra
C	4	Kacper Jaworski	17 – 20 April 2005	2.11 m (6 ft 11 in)	(Poland) Śląsk Wrocław
SG	5	Mateusz Orłowski	15 – 29 August 2006	1.90 m (6 ft 3 in)	(Poland) Korona Kraków
G	6	Jakub Osiński	17 – 28 April 2005	1.88 m (6 ft 2 in)	(Poland) Hutnik Warszawa
SF	7	Jan Nowicki	17 – 31 March 2005	2.01 m (6 ft 7 in)	(Poland) Basket Junior Poznań
SG	8	Igor Urban	16 – 29 July 2005	1.92 m (6 ft 4 in)	(Poland) Basket Junior Poznań
SF	9	Tymoteusz Sternicki	16 – 10 June 2006	2.03 m (6 ft 8 in)	(Poland) Gdyńska Akademia Koszykówki
PF	10	Szymon Nowicki	17 – 2 June 2005	2.01 m (6 ft 7 in)	(Poland) Gdyńska Akademia Koszykówki
PF	13	Jakub Szumert	16 – 4 December 2005	2.03 m (6 ft 8 in)	(Poland) Hutnik Warszawa
SG	14	Iwo Baganc	15 – 12 November 2006	1.94 m (6 ft 4 in)	(Poland) Fundacja Basket Poznań

Head coach

Wojciech Bychawski

Assistant coach(es)

Rafał Gil
Marek Żukowski
