= Halaifonua =

Halaifonua is a Tongan surname. Notable people with the surname include:

- David Halaifonua (born 1987), Tongan rugby union player
- Julius Halaifonua (born 2006), New Zealand basketball player
- Tanginoa Halaifonua (born 1996), Tongan rugby union player
