= Justin Schueller =

Australian professional basketball coach

Personal information
- Born: 1981 (age 44–45)

Career information
- Coaching career: 2007–present

Career history

Coaching
- 2007–2008: North Adelaide Rockets
- 2017–2019: Kilsyth Cobras
- 2017–2023: Melbourne United (assistant)
- 2021–2022: Geelong Supercats
- 2023–2025: Brisbane Bullets

Career highlights
- As head coach: Central ABL champion (2007); As assistant coach: 2× NBL champion (2018, 2021)

Justin Schueller (born c. 1981) is an Australian professional basketball coach. Between 2017 and 2023, he spent six seasons as an assistant coach with Melbourne United of the National Basketball League (NBL), including their NBL championship-winning seasons in 2017–18 and 2020–21. Between 2023 and 2025, he served as head coach of the Brisbane Bullets.

== Early career ==
Schueller grew up playing basketball until getting injured at senior level, when he subsequently moved into coaching.

In 2007 and 2008, Schueller served as head coach of the North Adelaide Rockets in the Central ABL. He guided the Rockets to the 2007 Central ABL championship.

Schueller was a basketball coach at the Tasmanian Institute of Sport for around five years before departing in 2013. He subsequently became the Basketball Victoria Country high performance coach.

== Professional career ==
In September 2016, Schueller was appointed head coach of the Kilsyth Cobras men's team of the South East Australian Basketball League (SEABL) for the 2017 season. He led the Cobras to an 11–13 record, tied for the fourth best record in the East Conference. He returned to the Cobras for the 2018 SEABL season, where he led the men's team to a league-best 15–5 regular season record before falling just short of a grand final berth with a loss in the preliminary final. He returned to the Cobras in 2019 for the inaugural season of the NBL1. He led the men's team to the NBL1 semi-finals before parting ways with the club after three seasons.

In 2017, Schueller became a development coach with Melbourne United of the National Basketball League (NBL). He served as an assistant coach with United for six seasons, including their NBL championship-winning seasons in 2017–18 and 2020–21.

Schueller joined the Geelong Supercats as head coach for the 2020 NBL1 season. After his first season was cancelled due to the COVID-19 pandemic, he coached the Supercats in the 2021 season and 2022 season. He missed a handful of games during the 2022 season due to Melbourne United finals commitments and international duties. The Supercats concluded the 2022 season with a record of 12 wins and 10 losses, securing eighth position by a single game to qualify for the postseason.

On 8 February 2023, Schueller was appointed head coach of the Brisbane Bullets on a two-year deal. In the 2023–24 NBL season, the Bullets finished in seventh spot in the standings with a record of 13 wins and 15 losses, missing out on the play-in by percentage margin. The Bullets endured an injury-ravaged season in 2024–25, as they finished outside the top six with a 12–17 record. On 17 February 2025, the club parted ways with Schueller.

== National team career ==
In 2014, Schueller served as an assistant coach with the Australian under-17 men's team at the FIBA Under-17 World Championship, where the team won silver. He continued as an assistant coach with the team at the 2016 FIBA Under-17 World Championship. He was elevated to head coach of the under-17 men's team in 2017, going on to lead the team to sixth place at the 2018 FIBA Under-17 Basketball World Cup. After helping the Crocodiles to a gold medal and a perfect 6–0 record across the 2022 FIBA Under-16 Asian Championship, he led the team at the 2022 FIBA Under-17 Basketball World Cup.

== Personal life ==
Schueller is married to wife Cody. As of 2023, he lived in Williamstown, Victoria.
