= 2022 FIBA Under-17 Basketball World Cup =

International men's youth basketball championship

Tournament details
- Host country: Spain
- Dates: 2–10 July
- Teams: 16 (from 4 confederations)
- Venues: 3 (in 1 host city)

Final positions
- Champions: United States (6th title)
- Runners-up: Spain
- Third place: France
- Fourth place: Lithuania

Tournament statistics
- Games played: 56
- Attendance: 27,678 (494 per game)
- MVP: (Spain) Izan Almansa
- Top scorer: (Slovenia) Jan Vide (20.1 points per game)

Official website
- www.fiba.basketball

The 2022 FIBA Under-17 Basketball World Cup (Spanish: Copa del Mundo de Baloncesto FIBA Sub-17 2022) was the seventh edition of the FIBA Under-17 Basketball World Cup, the biennial international men's youth basketball championship contested by the U17 national teams of the member associations of FIBA.

It was hosted by Spain from 2 to 10 July 2022. It was originally planned to be played in La Nucia and Alicante, then was moved to Málaga.

The United States won their sixth title with a win over Spain, while France defeated Lithuania for the bronze medal.

== Qualified teams ==
Means of qualification	Dates	Venue(s)	Berth(s)	Qualifiers
Host nation	–	–	1	Spain
2021 FIBA Under-16 African Championship	6–15 August 2021	(Egypt) Cairo	2	Egypt; Mali
2021 FIBA U16 European Challengers	16–21 August 2021	Various	5	France; Lithuania; Poland; Serbia; Slovenia
2021 FIBA Under-16 Americas Championship	23–29 August 2021	(Mexico) Xalapa	4	Argentina; Canada; Dominican Republic; United States
2022 FIBA U16 Asian Championship (Note: Postponed to 2022 due to the COVID-19 pandemic in Asia.)	12–19 June 2022	(Qatar) Doha	4	Australia; Japan; New Zealand; Lebanon
Total			16	

== Venue ==
Málaga	2022 FIBA Under-17 Basketball World Cup (Spain)
Martín Carpena	2022 FIBA Under-17 Basketball World Cup (Spain)
Capacity: 11,300	2022 FIBA Under-17 Basketball World Cup (Spain)

== Draw ==
The draw took place on 17 March 2022.

=== Seeding ===
Pot 1 Team United States Argentina Spain France	Pot 2 Team Lithuania Poland Serbia Slovenia	Pot 3 Team Australia Japan New Zealand Lebanon	Pot 4 Team Canada Dominican Republic Egypt Mali

== Preliminary round ==
All times are local (UTC+2).

=== Group A ===
Pos	Team	Pld	W	L	PF	PA	PD	Pts
1	France	3	3	0	272	158	+114	6
2	Serbia	3	2	1	274	220	+54	5
3	Canada	3	1	2	216	219	−3	4
4	New Zealand	3	0	3	153	318	−165	3

Source: FIBA
Rules for classification: 1) Points; 2) Head-to-head results; 3) Points difference; 4) Points scored.

2 July 2022
13:15

Boxscore

New Zealand	46–94	Canada
Scoring by quarter: 10–15, 8–22, 12–22, 16–35
Pts: Trego 14; Rebs: Book 12; Asts: Book, Trego 3		Pts: Sharma 16; Rebs: Rioux 10; Asts: Theodosiou, Tyne 4

Polideportivo Municipal El Limón, Alhaurín de la Torre
Attendance: 0
Referees: Ashley Gloss (USA), Daigo Urushima (JPN), Özlem Yalman (TUR)

2 July 2022
15:45

Boxscore

France	81–68	Serbia
Scoring by quarter: 13–26, 26–9, 24–14, 18–19
Pts: Penda 13; Rebs: Fibleuil 8 Asts: Pietrus, Pichard 4		Pts: Bošnjaković 13; Rebs: Jović 8 Asts: Stanković 5

Polideportivo Municipal El Limón, Alhaurín de la Torre
Attendance: 146
Referees: Daniel García (VEN), Jenna Reneau (USA), Ariadna Chueca (ESP)

3 July 2022
13:15

Boxscore

Serbia	120–72	New Zealand
Scoring by quarter: 27–17, 32–21, 32–15, 29–19
Pts: Jović 18; Rebs: Mikić 10; Asts: Mušicki 5		Pts: Halaifonua 26; Rebs: Halaifonua 6 Asts: Trego 6

Polideportivo Municipal El Limón, Alhaurín de la Torre
Attendance: 130
Referees: Martin Vulić (CRO), Lee Kyoung-hwan (KOR), Yana Nikogossyan (KAZ)

3 July 2022
15:45

Boxscore

Canada	55–87	France
Scoring by quarter: 9–26, 23–23, 9–19, 14–19
Pts: Okojie 15; Rebs: Milicevic, Rioux 6 Asts: Okojie 3		Pts: Fibleuil 15; Rebs: Sarr 8 Asts: Dadiet 6

Polideportivo Municipal El Limón, Alhaurín de la Torre
Attendance: 275
Referees: Julio Anaya (PAN), Andreia Silva (BRA), Yasmina Alcaraz (ESP)

5 July 2022
13:15

Boxscore

New Zealand	35–104	France
Scoring by quarter: 10–26, 9–24, 9–17, 7–37
Pts: Book 17; Rebs: Halaifonua 7 Asts: Trego 2		Pts: Risacher 19; Rebs: Jacques 10; Asts: Pietrus 5

Polideportivo Municipal El Limón, Alhaurín de la Torre
Attendance: 157
Referees: Scott Beker (AUS), Wojciech Liszka (POL), Joyce Muchenu (ZIM)

5 July 2022
15:45

Boxscore

Serbia	86–67	Canada
Scoring by quarter: 31–8, 14–19, 25–23, 16–17
Pts: Jović 20; Rebs: Bošnjaković 10; Asts: Stanković 5		Pts: four players 10; Rebs: Osei, Pitt 7 Asts: Okojie 5

Polideportivo Municipal El Limón, Alhaurín de la Torre
Attendance: 220
Referees: Johnny Batista (PUR), Ashley Gloss (USA), Mihkel Männiste (EST)

=== Group B ===
Pos	Team	Pld	W	L	PF	PA	PD	Pts
1	Lithuania	3	3	0	252	191	+61	6
2	Spain (H)	3	2	1	250	186	+64	5
3	Dominican Republic	3	1	2	196	250	−54	4
4	Japan	3	0	3	192	263	−71	3

Source: FIBA
Rules for classification: 1) Points; 2) Head-to-head results; 3) Points difference; 4) Points scored.
(H) Hosts

2 July 2022
18:30

Boxscore

Dominican Republic	81–69	Japan
Scoring by quarter: 20–9, 18–17, 28–13, 15–30
Pts: Aybar 28; Rebs: Liberato 9 Asts: Liberato 4		Pts: Kawashima 16; Rebs: Kawashima 9 Asts: Sakihama 4

Polideportivo Municipal El Limón, Alhaurín de la Torre
Attendance: 194
Referees: Andreia Silva (BRA), Mihkel Männiste (EST), Saif Al-Dossari (QAT)

2 July 2022
21:00

Boxscore

Spain	68–71	Lithuania
Scoring by quarter: 20–19, 14–10, 11–17, 23–25
Pts: Mara 15; Rebs: Almansa 9 Asts: Martínez 5		Pts: Stonkus 24; Rebs: Bieliauskas 12; Asts: Kulieša, Navickas 2

Polideportivo Municipal El Limón, Alhaurín de la Torre
Attendance: 613
Referees: Julio Anaya (PAN), Blanca Burns (USA), Gatis Saliņš (LAT)

3 July 2022
18:30

Boxscore

Lithuania	108–60	Dominican Republic
Scoring by quarter: 28–22, 29–9, 28–18, 23–11
Pts: Stonkus 16; Rebs: Bieliauskas, Matulevič 7 Asts: Kepežinskas 5		Pts: Díaz 15; Rebs: Pichard 4 Asts: Carbuccia 3

Polideportivo Municipal El Limón, Alhaurín de la Torre
Attendance: 166
Referees: Johnny Batista (PUR), Jenna Reneau (USA), Ariadna Chueca (ESP)

3 July 2022
21:00

Boxscore

Japan	60–109	Spain
Scoring by quarter: 11–33, 18–20, 11–24, 20–32
Pts: Kawashima 16; Rebs: Kawashima 3 Asts: Kajitani 3		Pts: Almansa 15; Rebs: Almansa 16; Asts: Folgueiras 5

Polideportivo Municipal El Limón, Alhaurín de la Torre
Attendance: 459
Referees: Scott Beker (AUS), Wojciech Liszka (POL), Andrada Csender (ROU)

5 July 2022
18:30

Boxscore

Japan	63–73	Lithuania
Scoring by quarter: 11–19, 14–25, 25–12, 13–17
Pts: Kawashima 27; Rebs: Kawashima 10; Asts: Sakihama 8		Pts: Bieliauskas 14; Rebs: Bieliauskas 13; Asts: Žygas 5

Polideportivo Municipal El Limón, Alhaurín de la Torre
Attendance: 160
Referees: Daniel García (VEN), Blanca Burns (USA), Sara El-Sharnouby (EGY)

5 July 2022
21:00

Boxscore

Spain	73–55	Dominican Republic
Scoring by quarter: 20–10, 16–13, 16–20, 21–12
Pts: Almansa, Hernández 13; Rebs: Almansa 7 Asts: De Larrea 9		Pts: Aybar 16; Rebs: Solano 6 Asts: Aybar, Carbuccia 4

Polideportivo Municipal El Limón, Alhaurín de la Torre
Attendance: 481
Referees: Kerem Baki (TUR), Andreia Silva (BRA), Carlos Vélez (COL)

=== Group C ===
Pos	Team	Pld	W	L	PF	PA	PD	Pts
1	United States	3	3	0	320	163	+157	6
2	Slovenia	3	2	1	204	195	+9	5
3	Mali	3	1	2	213	225	−12	4
4	Lebanon	3	0	3	143	297	−154	3

Source: FIBA
Rules for classification: 1) Points; 2) Head-to-head results; 3) Points difference; 4) Points scored.

2 July 2022
18:15

Boxscore

Mali	56–65	Slovenia
Scoring by quarter: 8–11, 17–12, 15–21, 16–21
Pts: M. Diallo 19; Rebs: M. Diallo 10; Asts: Dagnon, M. Diallo 5		Pts: Vide 31; Rebs: Tratar 11; Asts: Pirš 3

Palacio de los Deportes Elena Benítez, San Pedro Alcántara
Attendance: 152
Referees: Wojciech Liszka (POL), Viola Györgyi (ROU), Sara El-Sharnouby (EGY)

2 July 2022
20:45

Boxscore

United States	120–44	Lebanon
Scoring by quarter: 28–16, 31–12, 34–11, 27–5
Pts: Castillo, Jackson 21; Rebs: Flagg 13; Asts: Fland 9		Pts: Avedissian 13; Rebs: Saleh 7 Asts: Azzi 2

Palacio de los Deportes Elena Benítez, San Pedro Alcántara
Attendance: 280
Referees: Scott Beker (AUS), Ryan Jones (NZL), Joyce Muchenu (ZIM)

3 July 2022
18:15

Boxscore

Lebanon	48–93	Mali
Scoring by quarter: 11–30, 16–20, 9–38, 12–15
Pts: Avedissian 12; Rebs: Saleh 5 Asts: Hachem 3		Pts: Doumbia 20; Rebs: Coulibaly 18; Asts: Diawara 5

Palacio de los Deportes Elena Benítez, San Pedro Alcántara
Attendance: 216
Referees: Kerem Baki (TUR), Ryan Jones (NZL), Özlem Yalman (TUR)

3 July 2022
20:45

Boxscore

Slovenia	55–88	United States
Scoring by quarter: 12–20, 12–20, 15–26, 16–22
Pts: Vide 20; Rebs: Vide 6 Asts: Vide 2		Pts: Holland 14; Rebs: Flagg, Stewart 8 Asts: four players 3

Palacio de los Deportes Elena Benítez, San Pedro Alcántara
Attendance: 644
Referees: Gatis Saliņš (LAT), Joyce Muchenu (ZIM), Arnau Padros (ESP)

5 July 2022
18:15

Boxscore

Slovenia	84–51	Lebanon
Scoring by quarter: 14–13, 21–16, 26–13, 23–9
Pts: Borišek 16; Rebs: Rener 10; Asts: Pirs 6		Pts: Zamatta 17; Rebs: Zamatta 12; Asts: Hachem 4

Palacio de los Deportes Elena Benítez, San Pedro Alcántara
Attendance: 294
Referees: Viola Györgyi (ROU), Yasmina Alcaraz (ESP), Ariadna Chueca (ESP)

5 July 2022
20:45

Boxscore

United States	112–64	Mali
Scoring by quarter: 16–12, 39–20, 24–15, 33–17
Pts: Jackson 26; Rebs: Stewart 8 Asts: Fears Jr. 7		Pts: Coulibaly 15; Rebs: Keita 12; Asts: Keita 4

Palacio de los Deportes Elena Benítez, San Pedro Alcántara
Attendance: 627
Referees: Julio Anaya (PAN), Andrada Csender (ROU), Saif Al-Dossari (QAT)

=== Group D ===
Pos	Team	Pld	W	L	PF	PA	PD	Pts
1	Australia	3	3	0	262	164	+98	6
2	Poland	3	2	1	223	198	+25	5
3	Argentina	3	1	2	157	207	−50	4
4	Egypt	3	0	3	161	234	−73	3

Source: FIBA
Rules for classification: 1) Points; 2) Head-to-head results; 3) Points difference; 4) Points scored.

2 July 2022
13:00

Boxscore

Australia	85–68	Poland
Scoring by quarter: 24–18, 15–15, 17–18, 29–17
Pts: Zikarsky 19; Rebs: Zikarsky 12; Asts: Dent 7		Pts: J. Nowicki 14; Rebs: J. Nowicki, Sternicki 8 Asts: J. Nowicki 3

Palacio de los Deportes Elena Benítez, San Pedro Alcántara
Attendance: 350
Referees: Martin Vulić (CRO), Carlos Vélez (COL), Lee Kyoung-hwan (KOR)

2 July 2022
15:30

Boxscore

Argentina	59–50	Egypt
Scoring by quarter: 18–16, 14–9, 14–10, 13–15
Pts: Giovannetti 22; Rebs: Respaud, Sinigoj 8 Asts: Giovannetti 3		Pts: Abdelmeguid 11; Rebs: Amer, Hendawy 7 Asts: El-Gizawy, Hussin 3

Palacio de los Deportes Elena Benítez, San Pedro Alcántara
Attendance: 217
Referees: Kerem Baki (TUR), Johnny Batista (PUR), Yasmina Alcaraz (ESP)

3 July 2022
13:00

Boxscore

Egypt	46–91	Australia
Scoring by quarter: 16–23, 12–13, 14–23, 4–32
Pts: El-Halawany 18; Rebs: El-Ghayesh 6 Asts: El-Halawany 3		Pts: Zikarsky 17; Rebs: Zikarsky 10; Asts: Ferronato 6

Palacio de los Deportes Elena Benítez, San Pedro Alcántara
Attendance: 187
Referees: Ashley Gloss (USA), Mihkel Männiste (EST), Amir Taboubi (TUN)

3 July 2022
15:30

Boxscore

Poland	71–48	Argentina
Scoring by quarter: 25–15, 17–14, 12–8, 17–11
Pts: S. Nowicki 17; Rebs: S. Nowicki 13; Asts: Osiński 8		Pts: Giovannetti 9 Rebs: Respaud 6 Asts: Bocca 2

Palacio de los Deportes Elena Benítez, San Pedro Alcántara
Attendance: 291
Referees: Daniel García (VEN), Blanca Burns (USA), Daigo Urushima (JPN)

5 July 2022
13:00

Boxscore

Australia	86–50	Argentina
Scoring by quarter: 26–10, 24–15, 15–15, 21–10
Pts: Savage 15; Rebs: Zikarsky 11; Asts: Dent 6		Pts: Bocca 8 Rebs: Respaud 7 Asts: Bilbao, Prome 2

Palacio de los Deportes Elena Benítez, San Pedro Alcántara
Attendance: 213
Referees: Martin Vulić (CRO), Daigo Urushima (JPN), Amir Taboubi (TUN)

5 July 2022
15:30

Boxscore

Egypt	65–84	Poland
Scoring by quarter: 19–21, 16–22, 8–21, 22–20
Pts: El-Gizawy, Hendawy 19; Rebs: Amer 7 Asts: Hendawy 4		Pts: S. Nowicki 17; Rebs: S. Nowicki 9 Asts: Kuczawski 5

Palacio de los Deportes Elena Benítez, San Pedro Alcántara
Attendance: 271
Referees: Gatis Salins (LAT), Arnau Padros Feliu (ESP), Yana Nikogossyan (KAZ)

== Final round ==
=== Bracket ===
Round of 16
6 July
France	108
Japan	43
6 July
Slovenia	69
Argentina	55
6 July
Canada	63
Spain	87
6 July
Lebanon	43
Australia	93
6 July
Serbia	107
Dominican Republic	77
6 July
United States	103
Egypt	48
6 July
New Zealand	48
Lithuania	61
6 July
Mali	58
Poland	76

Quarter-finals
8 July
France	83
Slovenia	63
8 July
Spain	70
Australia	68
8 July
Serbia	80
United States	106
8 July
Lithuania	73
Poland	44

Semi-finals
9 July
France	53
Spain	68
9 July
United States	89
Lithuania	62

Final
10 July
Spain	67
United States	79
Third place
10 July
France	66
Lithuania	58

=== Round of 16 ===
6 July 2022
13:00

Boxscore

Lebanon	43–93	Australia
Scoring by quarter: 10–23, 7–30, 17–24, 9–16
Pts: Zamatta 11; Rebs: Zamatta 11; Asts: Hachem 2		Pts: Zikarsky 15; Rebs: O'Donnell 11; Asts: Rapp, Siulepa 5

Palacio de los Deportes Elena Benítez, San Pedro Alcántara
Attendance: 152
Referees: Andreia Silva (BRA), Martin Vulić (CRO), Joyce Muchenu (ZIM)

6 July 2022
13:15

Boxscore

France	108–43	Japan
Scoring by quarter: 25–17, 28–6, 26–16, 29–4
Pts: Sarr 19; Rebs: Fibleuil 7 Asts: Pichard 5		Pts: Kawashima 14; Rebs: Naito, Watanabe 3 Asts: Rooney 4

Polideportivo Municipal El Limón, Alhaurín de la Torre
Attendance: 102
Referees: Viola Györgyi (ROU), Ryan Jones (NZL), Saif Al-Dossari (QAT)

6 July 2022
16:30

Boxscore

Slovenia	69–55	Argentina
Scoring by quarter: 9–17, 26–8, 15–17, 19–13
Pts: Vide 20; Rebs: Popovic 12; Asts: Vide 8		Pts: Giovannetti 15; Rebs: Bocca 7 Asts: three players 2

Palacio de los Deportes Elena Benítez, San Pedro Alcántara
Attendance: 257
Referees: Johnny Batista (PUR), Ashley Gloss (USA), Andrada Csender (ROU)

6 July 2022
16:45

Boxscore

New Zealand	48–61	Lithuania
Scoring by quarter: 9–18, 15–18, 14–9, 10–16
Pts: Book 15; Rebs: Book 14; Asts: Trego 4		Pts: Žygas 13; Rebs: Bieliauskas 13; Asts: Kepežinskas 5

Polideportivo Municipal El Limón, Alhaurín de la Torre
Attendance: 189
Referees: Daniel García (VEN), Vélez (COL), Yasmina Alcaraz (ESP)

6 July 2022
19:15

Boxscore

United States	103–48	Egypt
Scoring by quarter: 34–11, 28–12, 27–19, 14–6
Pts: Knox 18; Rebs: Flagg 10; Asts: Fland 5		Pts: Amer 11; Rebs: El-Halawany 6 Asts: Amer 2

Palacio de los Deportes Elena Benítez, San Pedro Alcántara
Attendance: 317
Referees: Özlem Yalman (TUR), Mihkel Männiste (EST), Kyounghwan Lee (KOR)

6 July 2022
19:30

Boxscore

Serbia	107–77	Dominican Republic
Scoring by quarter: 21–22, 33–17, 30–22, 23–16
Pts: Marković 18; Rebs: Mikić 10; Asts: Stanković 7		Pts: Aybar 30; Rebs: Liberato 7 Asts: Liberato 2

Polideportivo Municipal El Limón, Alhaurín de la Torre
Attendance: 216
Referees: Julio Cesar Anaya Freile (PAN), Scott Beker (AUS), Wojciech Liszka (POL)

6 July 2022
21:45

Boxscore

Mali	58–76	Poland
Scoring by quarter: 14–23, 10–12, 17–14, 17–27
Pts: M. Diallo 17; Rebs: M. Diallo 18; Asts: Doumbia 6		Pts: S. Nowicki 29; Rebs: Szumert 10; Asts: J. Nowicki 8

Palacio de los Deportes Elena Benítez, San Pedro Alcántara
Attendance: 413
Referees: Kerem Baki (TUR), Blanca Cecilia Burns (USA), Ariadna Chueca Moreno (ESP)

6 July 2022
22:00

Boxscore

Canada	63–87	Spain
Scoring by quarter: 14–18, 14–30, 22–18, 13–21
Pts: Okojie 17; Rebs: Milicevic 6 Asts: Okojie 4		Pts: Mara 14; Rebs: Pérez 13; Asts: Langarita 6

Polideportivo Municipal El Limón, Alhaurín de la Torre
Attendance: 707
Referees: Gatis Salins (LAT), Jenna Jordan Reneau (USA), Daigo Urushima (JPN)

=== 9–16th classification playoffs ===
Classification quarterfinals
8 July
Japan	66
Argentina	80
8 July
Canada	94
Lebanon	41
8 July
Dominican Republic	55
Egypt	61
8 July
New Zealand	80
Mali	59

Classification semifinals
9 July
Argentina	80
Canada	91
9 July
Egypt	82
New Zealand	54

Ninth place match
10 July
Canada	92
Egypt	70
Eleventh place match
10 July
Argentina	80
New Zealand	70

Classification semifinals
9 July
Japan	77
Lebanon	71
9 July
Dominican Republic	62
Mali	52

13th place match
10 July
Japan	68
Dominican Republic	85
15th place match
10 July
Lebanon	54
Mali	75

==== 9–16th place quarterfinals ====
8 July 2022
12:30

Boxscore

Japan	66–80	Argentina
Scoring by quarter: 27–19, 10–23, 17–20, 12–18
Pts: Kawashima 26; Rebs: Naito 7 Asts: Sakihama 11		Pts: Sinigoj 20; Rebs: Prome 7 Asts: Respaud 5

Polideportivo Municipal El Limón, Alhaurín de la Torre
Attendance: 0
Referees: Daniel Garcia (VEN), Ryan Jones (NZL), Sara El-Sharnouby (EGY)

8 July 2022
15:00

Boxscore

Dominican Republic	55–61	Egypt
Scoring by quarter: 13–17, 6–13, 14–13, 22–18
Pts: Aybar 16; Rebs: Díaz 10; Asts: Muñoz 4		Pts: Hendawy 24; Rebs: three players 10; Asts: El-Gizawy, El-Selmy 3

Polideportivo Municipal El Limón, Alhaurín de la Torre
Attendance: 39
Referees: Martin Vulić (CRO), Özlem Yalman (TUR), Lee Kyoung-hwan (KOR)

8 July 2022
17:30

Boxscore

Canada	94–41	Lebanon
Scoring by quarter: 23–11, 22–5, 21–12, 28–13
Pts: Sharma 17; Rebs: Osei 9 Asts: Tyne 7		Pts: Zamatta 12; Rebs: Zamatta 9 Asts: Azzi 3

Polideportivo Municipal El Limón, Alhaurín de la Torre
Attendance: 29
Referees: Mihkel Männiste (EST), Joyce Muchenu (ZWE), Andrada Csender (ROU)

8 July 2022
20:00

Boxscore

New Zealand	80–59	Mali
Scoring by quarter: 19–9, 11–22, 23–12, 27–16
Pts: Turner 22; Rebs: Book 10; Asts: Book 5		Pts: Diallo 15; Rebs: Diallo 14; Asts: Dagnon 5

Polideportivo Municipal El Limón, Alhaurín de la Torre
Attendance: 61
Referees: Carlos Vélez (COL), Ashley Gloss (USA), Amir Taboubi (TUN)

==== 13–16th place semifinals ====
9 July 2022
12:30

Boxscore

Japan	77–71	Lebanon
Scoring by quarter: 13–23, 28–16, 15–21, 21–11
Pts: Kawashima 19; Rebs: Watanabe 9 Asts: Sakihama 5		Pts: Avedissian 26; Rebs: Zamatta 9 Asts: Hachem 4

Polideportivo Municipal El Limón, Alhaurín de la Torre
Attendance: 34
Referees: Viola Györgyi (ROU), Sara El-Sharnouby (EGY), Yana Nikogossyan (KAZ)

9 July 2022
15:00

Boxscore

Dominican Republic	62–52	Mali
Scoring by quarter: 16–17, 12–16, 19–12, 15–7
Pts: Diaz 16; Rebs: Liberato 12; Asts: Aybar 6		Pts: Doumbia 19; Rebs: M. Diallo 17; Asts: Keita 6

Polideportivo Municipal El Limón, Alhaurín de la Torre
Attendance: 54
Referees: Julio Anaya (PAN), Ariadna Chueca Moreno (ESP), Arnau Padros (ESP)

==== 15th place game ====
10 July 2022

Boxscore

Lebanon	54–75	Mali
Scoring by quarter: 20–18, 12–18, 12–18, 10–21
Pts: Avedissian 15; Rebs: Choueiri 10; Asts: Azzi 4		Pts: Doumbia 21; Rebs: Silimana 14; Asts: Dagnon, Keita 4

Polideportivo Municipal El Limón, Alhaurín de la Torre
Attendance: 12
Referees: Andrada Csender (ROU), Mihkel Männiste (EST), Amir Taboubi (TUN)

==== 13th place game ====
10 July 2022
12:30

Boxscore

Japan	68–85	Dominican Republic
Scoring by quarter: 14–12, 18–30, 10–20, 26–23
Pts: Ogawa 21; Rebs: Kawashima 13; Asts: Kawashima 5		Pts: Aybar, Carbuccia 17; Rebs: Estrella 9 Asts: Liberato, Muñoz 3

Polideportivo Municipal El Limón, Alhaurín de la Torre
Attendance: 26
Referees: Johnny Batista (PUR), Saif Al-Dossari (QAT), Yana Nikogossyan (KAZ)

==== 9–12th place semifinals ====
9 July 2022
17:30

Boxscore

Argentina	80–91	Canada
Scoring by quarter: 20–30, 19–22, 22–18, 19–21
Pts: Bocca 23; Rebs: Bocca 6 Asts: Respaud 6		Pts: Tyne 24; Rebs: Osei 8 Asts: Tyne 6

Polideportivo Municipal El Limón, Alhaurín de la Torre
Attendance: 69
Referees: Martin Vulić (CRO), Blanca Burns (USA), Yasmina Alcaraz (ESP)

9 July 2022
20:00

Boxscore

Egypt	82–54	New Zealand
Scoring by quarter: 20–13, 26–9, 12–15, 24–17
Pts: Abouelela 22; Rebs: El-Halawany 9 Asts: El-Halawany, Hussin 5		Pts: Matakatea 19; Rebs: Matakatea 9 Asts: Trego 7

Polideportivo Municipal El Limón, Alhaurín de la Torre
Attendance: 52
Referees: Jenna Reneau (USA), Daigo Urushima (JPN), Saif Al-Dossari (QAT)

==== Eleventh place game ====
10 July 2022

Boxscore

Argentina	80–70	New Zealand
Scoring by quarter: 23–14, 24–22, 9–17, 24–17
Pts: Respaud 17; Rebs: Viatri 8 Asts: Respaud 6		Pts: Halaifonua 18; Rebs: Halaifonua 13; Asts: Trego 4

Polideportivo Municipal El Limón, Alhaurín de la Torre
Attendance: 66
Referees: Carlos Vélez (COL), Özlem Yalman (TUR), Lee Kyoung-hwan (KOR)

==== Ninth place game ====
10 July 2022
18:00

Boxscore

Canada	92–70	Egypt
Scoring by quarter: 29–12, 24–16, 17–13, 22–29
Pts: Pitt, Sharma 13; Rebs: Okojie, Yeiy 9 Asts: Okojie 8		Pts: Hendawy 23; Rebs: El-Gizawy 8 Asts: El-Gizawy 7

Polideportivo Municipal El Limón, Alhaurín de la Torre
Attendance: 57
Referees: Viola Györgyi (ROU), Joyce Muchenu (ZIM), Ariadna Chueca (ESP)

=== Quarterfinals ===
8 July 2022
13:00

Boxscore

Lithuania	73–44	Poland
Scoring by quarter: 13–17, 23–7, 24–7, 13–13
Pts: Žygas 20; Rebs: Kazakevičius 11; Asts: Kepežinskas 7		Pts: Kuczawski 10; Rebs: S. Nowicki 7 Asts: Kosiorowski 2

Palacio de Deportes José María Martín Carpena, Málaga
Attendance: 304
Referees: Scott Beker (AUS), Daigo Urushima (JPN), Arianda Chueca Moreno (ESP)

8 July 2022
15:30

Boxscore

Serbia	80–106	United States
Scoring by quarter: 18–26, 18–22, 24–27, 20–31
Pts: Gačić 14; Rebs: Marković 9 Asts: Stanković 6		Pts: Flagg 18; Rebs: Flagg 11; Asts: Fears Jr. 5

Palacio de Deportes José María Martín Carpena, Málaga
Attendance: 649
Referees: Gatis Salins (LAT), Andreia Silva (BRA), Kerem Baki (TUR)

8 July 2022
18:30

Boxscore

France	83–63	Slovenia
Scoring by quarter: 26–14, 12–21, 19–16, 26–12
Pts: Risacher 14; Rebs: Risacher 8 Asts: Pietrus 5		Pts: Ličan 15; Rebs: Tratar 5 Asts: Vide 5

Palacio de Deportes José María Martín Carpena, Málaga
Attendance: 711
Referees: Jenna Reneau (USA), Wojciech Liszka (POL), Viola Györgyi (ROU)

8 July 2022
21:00

Boxscore

Spain	70–68	Australia
Scoring by quarter: 16–19, 15–18, 18–20, 21–11
Pts: Langarita 23; Rebs: Almansa 9 Asts: De Larrea 4		Pts: Dent 16; Rebs: Zikarsky 8 Asts: Dent 5

Palacio de Deportes José María Martín Carpena, Málaga
Attendance: 1,577
Referees: Julio Anaya (PAN), Blanca Burns (USA), Johnny Batista (PUR)

=== 5–8th classification playoffs ===
Classification semifinals
9 July
Slovenia	74
Australia	86
9 July
Serbia	105
Poland	75

Fifth place match
10 July
Australia	67
Serbia	69
Seventh place match
10 July
Slovenia	77
Poland	74

==== 5–8th place semifinals ====
9 July 2022
13:00

Boxscore

Serbia	105–75	Poland
Scoring by quarter: 28–22, 19–18, 32–18, 26–17
Pts: Bošnjaković, Stanković 20; Rebs: Stanković 11; Asts: Stanković 9		Pts: Kosiorowski 17; Rebs: S. Nowicki 13; Asts: Kuczawski 5

Palacio de Deportes José María Martín Carpena, Málaga
Attendance: 133
Referees: Johnny Batista (PUR), Carlos Vélez (COL), Ryan Jones (NZL)

9 July 2022
15:30

Boxscore

Slovenia	74–86	Australia
Scoring by quarter: 17–16, 14–19, 15–25, 28–26
Pts: Vide 25; Rebs: Tratar 8 Asts: Vide 6		Pts: Zikarsky 22; Rebs: Zikarsky 10; Asts: Devers 6

Palacio de Deportes José María Martín Carpena, Málaga
Attendance: 228
Referees: Mihkel Männiste (EST), Özlem Yalman (TUR), Ashley Gloss (USA)

==== Seventh place game ====
10 July 2022
13:00

Boxscore

Slovenia	77–74	Poland
Scoring by quarter: 20–16, 20–19, 20–18, 17–21
Pts: Vide 22; Rebs: Vide 7 Asts: Pirs 9		Pts: S. Nowicki 16; Rebs: S. Nowicki 11; Asts: S. Nowicki 6

Palacio de Deportes José María Martín Carpena, Málaga
Attendance: 142
Referees: Ashley Gloss (USA), Martin Vulić (CRO), Yasmina Alcaraz Moreno (ESP)

==== Fifth place game ====
10 July 2022
15:30

Boxscore

Australia	67–69	Serbia
Scoring by quarter: 24–21, 17–14, 16–16, 10–18
Pts: Dent 20; Rebs: O'Donnell 12; Asts: Dent 3		Pts: Bošnjaković 14; Rebs: Dožić 6 Asts: Stanković 4

Palacio de Deportes José María Martín Carpena, Málaga
Attendance: 231
Referees: Wojciech Liszka (POL), Andreia Silva (BRA), Daigo Urushima (JPN)

=== Semifinals ===
9 July 2022
18:30

Boxscore

United States	89–62	Lithuania
Scoring by quarter: 21–7, 17–14, 26–20, 25–21
Pts: Fears Jr. 18; Rebs: Holland 10; Asts: Holland 6		Pts: Žygas 17; Rebs: Bieliauskas, Padegimas 11; Asts: Žygas 4

Palacio de Deportes José María Martín Carpena, Málaga
Attendance: 1,385
Referees: Kerem Baki (TUR), Scott Beker (AUS), Wojciech Liszka (POL)

9 July 2022
21:00

Boxscore

France	53–68	Spain
Scoring by quarter: 17–13, 13–19, 18–14, 5–22
Pts: Malwaya 11; Rebs: Jacques 6 Asts: Risacher 5		Pts: Mara 16; Rebs: Almansa 14; Asts: Martínez 4

Palacio de Deportes José María Martín Carpena, Málaga
Attendance: 2,485
Referees: Gatis Saliņš (LAT), Andreia Silva (BRA), Daniel García (VEN)

=== Third place game ===
10 July 2022
18:30

Boxscore

France	66–58	Lithuania
Scoring by quarter: 18–14, 17–11, 21–16, 10–17
Pts: Fibleuil 16; Rebs: Jacques, Penda 6 Asts: Pichard 5		Pts: Stonkus 15; Rebs: three players 4 Asts: Kepežinskas 3

Palacio de Deportes José María Martín Carpena, Málaga
Attendance: 1,975
Referees: Jenna Reneau (USA), Scott Beker (AUS), Blanca Burns (USA)

=== Final ===
10 July 2022
21:00

Boxscore

Spain	67–79	United States
Scoring by quarter: 20–13, 18–20, 13–29, 16–17
Pts: Mara, González 16; Rebs: Almansa 15; Asts: Martínez 6		Pts: Fears Jr. 17; Rebs: Flagg 17; Asts: Fears Jr. 6

Palacio de Deportes José María Martín Carpena, Málaga
Attendance: 8,112
Referees: Julio Anaya (PAN), Gatis Saliņš (LAT), Kerem Baki (TUR)

== Final ranking ==
Rank	Team	Record
1st place, gold medalist(s)	United States	7–0
2nd place, silver medalist(s)	Spain	5–2
3rd place, bronze medalist(s)	France	6–1
4th	Lithuania	5–2
5th	Serbia	5–2
6th	Australia	5–2
7th	Slovenia	4–3
8th	Poland	3–4
9th	Canada	4–3
10th	Egypt	2–5
11th	Argentina	3–4
12th	New Zealand	1–6
13th	Dominican Republic	3–4
14th	Japan	1–6
15th	Mali	2–5
16th	Lebanon	0–7

== Statistics and awards ==
=== Statistical leaders ===
==== Players ====
Points

Name	PPG
(Slovenia) Jan Vide	20.1
(Japan) Yuto Kawashima	19.1
(Dominican Republic) Rodrigo Aybar	17.9
(Poland) Szymon Nowicki	14.4
(Australia) Rocco Zikarsky	13.6

Rebounds

Name	RPG
(Mali) Malick Diallo	12.6
(Spain) Izan Almansa	11.9
(United States) Cooper Flagg	10.0
(Lithuania) Aleksas Bieliauskas	9.6
(Poland) Szymon Nowicki	9.6

Assists

Name	APG
(Serbia) Ognjen Stanković	5.4
(Japan) Shuto Sakihama	4.9
(Australia) Joshua Dent	4.4
(United States) Jeremy Fears Jr.	4.4
(Canada) Osezojie Okojie	4.3
(New Zealand) Hunter Trego	4.3

Blocks

Name	BPG
(Australia) Rocco Zikarsky	3.1
(United States) Cooper Flagg	2.9
(Mali) Ladji Coulibaly	2.6
(Poland) Szymon Nowicki	2.6
(Poland) Jakub Szumert	2.1

Steals

Name	SPG
(Poland) Szymon Nowicki	3.6
(Dominican Republic) Yeison Liberato	2.7
(Japan) Shuto Sakihama	2.6
(United States) Cooper Flagg	2.4
(Serbia) Ognjen Stanković	2.4

Efficiency

Name	EFFPG
(Poland) Szymon Nowicki	21.7
(Australia) Rocco Zikarsky	20.3
(Spain) Izan Almansa	20.1
(Mali) Malick Diallo	19.9
(United States) Cooper Flagg	19.4

==== Teams ====
Points

Team	PPG
United States	99.6
Serbia	90.7
France	83.1
Australia	82.3
Canada	79.4

Rebounds

Team	RPG
United States	55.3
Australia	53.7
Mali	52.4
Lithuania	49.3
Canada	46.3

Assists

Team	APG
United States	23.3
Spain	19.7
Australia	19.4
Serbia	18.4
France	18.1

Blocks

Team	BPG
United States	8.3
Australia	7.3
Mali	5.9
Spain	5.7
Poland	5.6

Steals

Team	SPG
United States	16.3
France	13.1
Dominican Republic	12.4
Serbia	11.7
Poland	11.6

Efficiency

Team	EFFPG
United States	133.4
France	105.3
Australia	105.0
Serbia	100.3
Spain	96.0

=== Awards ===
The awards were announced on 11 July 2022.

Position	Player
All-Tournament Team	(Spain) Lucas Langarita
All-Tournament Team	(France) Ilane Fibleuil
All-Tournament Team	(United States) Koa Peat
All-Tournament Team	(United States) Cooper Flagg
All-Tournament Team	(Spain) Izan Almansa
MVP	(Spain) Izan Almansa
