= Boogie Fland =

American basketball player (born 2006)

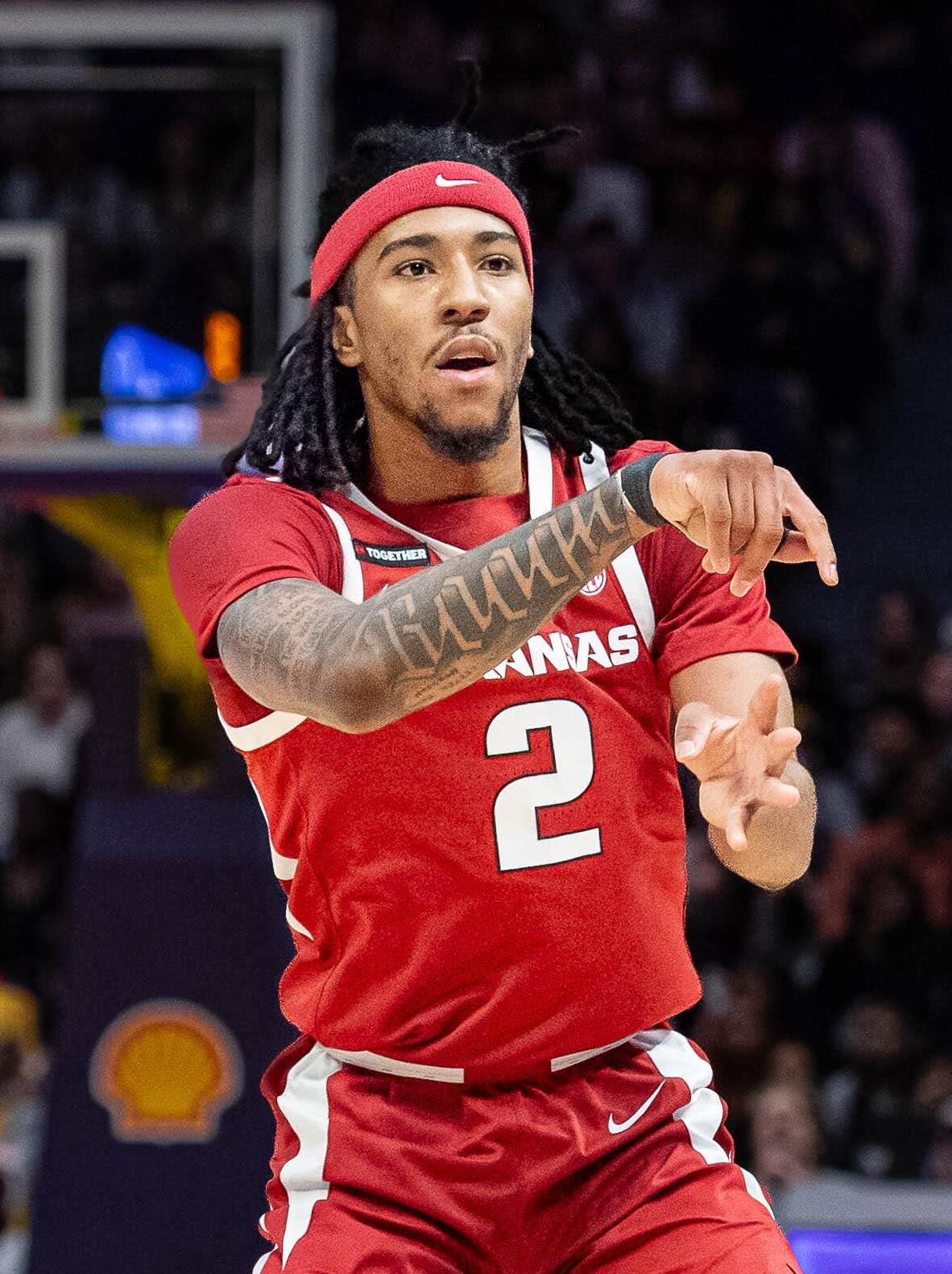
- Fland with Arkansas in 2025

No. 0 – Florida Gators
- Position: Point guard / shooting guard
- League: Southeastern Conference

Personal information
- Born: July 10, 2006 (age 20) New York City, New York, U.S.
- Listed height: 6 ft 3 in (1.91 m)
- Listed weight: 185 lb (84 kg)

Career information
- High school: Archbishop Stepinac (White Plains, New York)
- College: Arkansas (2024–2025); Florida (2025–present)

Career highlights
- McDonald's All-American (2024); Jordan Brand Classic (2024); Nike Hoop Summit (2024); Mr. New York Basketball (2024)
Medals
Men's basketball
Representing United States
FIBA Under-17 Basketball World Cup
Gold medal – first place	2022 Spain	Team

Johnuel "Boogie" Fland (born July 10, 2006) is an American college basketball player for the Florida Gators. He previously played for the Arkansas Razorbacks. ESPN and Rivals rated him as a five-star recruit while 247Sports rated him as a 4-star recruit. All three had rated him as one of the top 25 players in the class of 2024.

== Early life and high school career ==
A native of The Bronx, Fland attended local public schools throughout his early life. Fland’s father is Dominican-American while his mother is African-American. In middle school, he led M.S. 54 – Booker T. Washington to a city championship. Fland would attend Archbishop Stepinac High School, leading the school to the Catholic High School Athletic Association Intersectional Final his sophomore, Junior, and Senior years. Stepinac lost the 2022 final but won back-to-back in 2023 and 2024, with Fland announced the Finals MVP in both games. After the 2024 season ended, the CHSAA and Public Schools Athletic League announced that their champions would play each other for a city championship for the first time ever; Stepinac won this inaugural championship over the Eagle Academy for Young Men II. As a senior, Fland averaged 19.2 points, 6.5 rebounds, 3.6 assists, and 2.4 steals per game while leading the Crusaders to a 26–4 record.

As a sophomore, Fland was one of the first two New York City high school basketball players to receive NIL deals, along with his friend Ian Jackson. Along with Accelerate Sports Ventures, he developed a clothing line while also promoting the NIL merchandise platform Spreadshop.

=== Recruiting ===
Fland was rated a five-star recruit by ESPN and Rivals and a four-star recruit by 247Sports. Into his senior year, he fielded more than 30 recruiting offers from NCAA Division I basketball programs. In October 2023, he committed to playing college basketball for Kentucky over Alabama and Indiana after three visits from John Calipari in September and October. On April 15, 2024, he decommitted after John Calipari departed Kentucky for a coaching position at Arkansas. He ultimately opted to follow Calipari and committed to play at Arkansas on April 25, 2024.

College recruiting
Name	Hometown	School	Height	Weight	Commit date
Boogie Fland; SG	The Bronx, NY	Archbishop Stepinac High School (NY)	6 ft 2 in (1.88 m)	175 lb (79 kg)	Apr 25, 2024
Boogie Fland; SG	Recruit ratings: Rivals: 247Sports: ESPN: (91)				
Overall recruit ranking: Rivals: 10 247Sports: 22 ESPN: 16
Note: In many cases, Scout, Rivals, 247Sports, On3, and ESPN may conflict in their listings of height and weight.; In these cases, the average was taken. ESPN grades are on a 100-point scale.; Sources: "2024 Team Ranking". Rivals.

== College career ==
Fland averaged 13.5 points, 5.1 assists, 3.2 rebounds and 1.5 steals per game for Arkansas despite missing time with a thumb injury. He entered the 2025 NBA draft but ultimately decided to return to college. Fland transferred to defending national champion Florida for his sophomore season.

== Career statistics ==
Legend
GP	Games played	GS	Games started	MPG	Minutes per game
FG%	Field goal percentage	3P%	3-point field goal percentage	FT%	Free throw percentage
RPG	Rebounds per game	APG	Assists per game	SPG	Steals per game
BPG	Blocks per game	PPG	Points per game	**Bold**	Career high

=== College ===
Year	Team	GP	GS	MPG	FG%	3P%	FT%	RPG	APG	SPG	BPG	PPG
2024–25	Arkansas	21	18	31.8	.379	.340	.833	3.2	5.1	1.5	.0	13.5
2025–26	Florida	35	35	30.0	.447	.240	.726	2.5	3.5	1.7	.1	11.6

== National team career ==
Fland played for the United States under-17 basketball team at the 2022 FIBA Under-17 Basketball World Cup, averaging the second most assists on the team.

== Personal life ==
Fland was given the nickname 'Boogie' as a child because he was always dancing.
