= 2022 FIBA U16 Asian Championship =

Basketball championship

6th FIBA Under-16 Asian Basketball Championship

Tournament details
- Host country: Qatar
- City: Doha
- Dates: 12–19 June 2022
- Teams: 13 (from 1 confederation)
- Venue(s): 1 (in 1 host city)

Final positions
- Champions: Australia (2nd title)
- Runners-up: Japan
- Third place: New Zealand

Tournament statistics
- MVP: (Japan) Yuto Kawashima
- Top scorer: (Japan) Yuto Kawashima (26.6)
- Top rebounds: (India) Lokendra Singh (12.6)
- Top assists: (India) Jaideep Rathore (5.7)
- PPG (Team): Australia (95.8)
- RPG (Team): Australia (59.8)
- APG (Team): Australia (20.2)

Official website
- www.fiba.basketball/history

The 2022 FIBA U16 Asian Championship was the sixth edition of the under-16 basketball championship in the International Basketball Federation's FIBA Asia zone. The tournament was held in Doha, Qatar from 12 to 19 June 2022. This marked the return of the Under-16 competition which was last held five years ago in China.

Australia successfully defended their U16 title against Japan in the final, 94–63, while New Zealand retained the bronze medal after defeating first-time semifinalists Lebanon in the battle for third place, 89–62. All four semifinalists were qualified for the 2022 FIBA Under-17 Basketball World Cup in Spain as Asian representatives.

== Qualification ==
=== Allocation of berths ===
According to FIBA Asia rules, the number of participating teams in the FIBA U16 Asian Championship was set at 16. The hosts and the defending champions qualified automatically. All FIBA Asia subzones got two berths each, except for the Central and South Asian subzones, which got one berth each. FIBA Oceania also got one berth. The last three berths were allocated to Asian subzones based on their teams' results in the 2017 FIBA U16 Asian Championship.

Allocation of berths
Subzone	Automatic qualifiers		Default berths	Additional berths as top 3 Asian teams from last championship	Total
Subzone	Hosts	Defending champions	Default berths	Additional berths as top 3 Asian teams from last championship	Total
Central Asia	0	0	1	0	1
East Asia	0	0	2	2	4
Gulf	1	0	2	0	3
South Asia	0	0	1	0	1
Southeast Asia	0	0	2	1	3
West Asia	0	0	2	0	2
FIBA Oceania	0	1	1	—	2
Total	1	1	11	3	16

=== Qualified teams ===
The following is the list of the qualified teams. FIBA Boys' World Rankings as of 1 January 2022 are in parentheses.

- Central Asia (1)
  - Kazakhstan (80)
- East Asia (4)
  - ~~China~~ (21; withdrew)
  - ~~Chinese Taipei~~ (22; withdrew)
  - Japan (32)
  - South Korea (27)
- Gulf (3)
  - Qatar (NR; hosts)
  - Bahrain (43)
  - Kuwait (69)
- South Asia (1)
  - India (50)
- Southeast Asia (3)
  - Indonesia (66)
  - Philippines (24)
  - ~~Thailand~~ (60; withdrew)
- West Asia (2)
  - Iran (17)
  - Lebanon (35)
- FIBA Oceania (2)
  - Australia (8; defending champions)
  - New Zealand (30)

== Preliminary round ==
All times are local (UTC+3).

=== Group A ===
Pos	Team	Pld	W	L	PF	PA	PD	Pts	Qualification
1	Australia	3	3	0	287	115	+172	6	Advanced to Quarterfinals Round
2	India	3	2	1	204	187	+17	5	Proceeded to Playoffs Round
3	Qatar (H)	3	1	2	163	242	−79	4	Proceeded to Playoffs Round
4	Bahrain	3	0	3	143	253	−110	3	

Source: FIBA
Rules for classification: 1) Points; 2) Head-to-head results; 3) Points difference; 4) Points scored.
(H) Hosts

12 June 2022
15:45

Boxscore

India	47–95	Australia
Scoring by quarter: 7–22, 9–28, 11–26, 20–19
Pts: Rathore 13; Rebs: Dagar 4 Asts: Rathore 5		Pts: Zikarsky 18; Rebs: O'Donnell 19; Asts: Dent 8

Al-Gharafa Sports Club Multi-Purpose Hall, Doha
Referees:
Lee Seungmu
Ahmed Hassan Al Khamees
Rashid Al Musheifri

12 June 2022
18:00

Boxscore

Qatar	85–61	Bahrain
Scoring by quarter: 15–22, 22–14, 26–14, 22–11
Pts: Ndao 20; Rebs: Hajar 9 Asts: Abuissa 3		Pts: Fardan 15; Rebs: Salem 9 Asts: Ahmed 3

Al-Gharafa Sports Club Multi-Purpose Hall, Doha
Referees:
Yevgeniy Mikheyev
Callum Welch
Haruga Iwai

13 June 2022
13:30

Boxscore

Bahrain	41–80	India
Scoring by quarter: 8–19, 12–18, 12–18, 9–25
Pts: Ghareeb 15; Rebs: Ramadhan 7 Asts: four players 2		Pts: K. Singh 22; Rebs: J. Singh 10; Asts: Dagar, Rathore 6

Al-Gharafa Sports Club Multi-Purpose Hall, Doha
Referees:
Yevgeniy Mikheyev
Ahmed Hassan Al Khamees
Callum Welch

13 June 2022
18:00

Boxscore

Australia	104–27	Qatar
Scoring by quarter: 18–10, 21–6, 37–7, 28–4
Pts: Zikarsky 16; Rebs: Zikarsky 10; Asts: Rapp, Savage 5		Pts: Abuissa, Mousa 6 Rebs: Mousa 5 Asts: Alojan, Daradkeh 1

Al-Gharafa Sports Club Multi-Purpose Hall, Doha
Referees:
Seungmu Lee
Mohammed Hasan Fanharawi
Rashid Al Musheifri

14 June 2022
11:15

Boxscore

Australia	88–41	Bahrain
Scoring by quarter: 19–12, 19–11, 19–9, 31–9
Pts: Savage 16; Rebs: Zikarsky 15; Asts: Rapp 3		Pts: Nayem 10; Rebs: Almashari 5 Asts: Ramadhan 5

Al-Gharafa Sports Club Multi-Purpose Hall, Doha
Referees:
Callum Welch
Khaled Alshammari
Rashid Al Musheifri

14 June 2022
18:00

Boxscore

India	77–51	Qatar
Scoring by quarter: 23–16, 14–13, 29–9, 11–13
Pts: K. Singh 31; Rebs: L. Singh 12; Asts: L. Singh, Rathore 7		Pts: Mousa 15; Rebs: three players 9 Asts: Hajar 3

Al-Gharafa Sports Club Multi-Purpose Hall, Doha
Referees:
Seungmu Lee
Reynante Hufana
Mohammed Hasan Fanharawi

=== Group B ===
Pos	Team	Pld	W	L	PF	PA	PD	Pts	Qualification
1	Iran	2	2	0	139	93	+46	4	Advanced to Quarterfinals Round
2	Lebanon	2	1	1	132	122	+10	3	Proceeded to Playoffs Round
3	Indonesia	2	0	2	86	142	−56	2	Proceeded to Playoffs Round

Source: FIBA
Rules for classification: 1) Points; 2) Head-to-head results; 3) Points difference; 4) Points scored.

12 June 2022
20:15

Boxscore

Indonesia	49–76	Lebanon
Scoring by quarter: 18–27, 8–18, 12–20, 11–11
Pts: Wijaya 16; Rebs: Louis, Putra 8 Asts: Louis 4		Pts: Avedissian 19; Rebs: Zamatta 10; Asts: Azzi 3

Al-Gharafa Sports Club Multi-Purpose Hall, Doha
Referees:
Reynante Hufana
Mohammed Hasan Fanharawi
Khaled AlShammari

13 June 2022
15:45

Boxscore

Iran	66–37	Indonesia
Scoring by quarter: 18–12, 18–8, 19–14, 11–3
Pts: Amini 25; Rebs: Amini 15; Asts: Parand, Samiei 2		Pts: Louis 9 Rebs: Abhyasa 7 Asts: Wijaya 2

Al-Gharafa Sports Club Multi-Purpose Hall, Doha
Referees:
Reynante Hufana
Haruga Iwai
Khaled Alshammari

14 June 2022
20:15

Boxscore

Lebanon	56–73	Iran
Scoring by quarter: 11–23, 12–5, 13–21, 20–24
Pts: Hachem 14; Rebs: Zamatta 10; Asts: Avedissian, Azzi 3		Pts: Amini 29; Rebs: Jafari 15; Asts: Beygi 4

Al-Gharafa Sports Club Multi-Purpose Hall, Doha
Referees:
Yevgeniy Mikheyev
Haruga Iwai
Ahmed Hassan Al Khamees

=== Group C ===
Pos	Team	Pld	W	L	PF	PA	PD	Pts	Qualification
1	Japan	2	2	0	171	100	+71	4	Advanced to Quarterfinals Round
2	Philippines	2	1	1	149	118	+31	3	Proceeded to Playoffs Round
3	Kuwait	2	0	2	78	180	−102	2	Proceeded to Playoffs Round

Source: FIBA
Rules for classification: 1) Points; 2) Head-to-head results; 3) Points difference; 4) Points scored.

12 June 2022
13:30

Boxscore

Kuwait	33–98	Japan
Scoring by quarter: 6–23, 5–23, 13–29, 9–23
Pts: Asadallah 10; Rebs: Asadallah 5 Asts: five players 1		Pts: Ogawa 15; Rebs: Naito 13; Asts: Sakihama 6

Al-Gharafa Sports Club Multi-Purpose Hall, Doha
Referees:
Craig Copes
Rakesh Ramalingaiah
Bandar Jassim Al Suwaidi

13 June 2022
20:15

Boxscore

Philippines	82–45	Kuwait
Scoring by quarter: 25–9, 18–15, 21–9, 18–12
Pts: Mahmood 16; Rebs: Bahay 8 Asts: Bahay 6		Pts: Alsaied 12; Rebs: Alsaied 9 Asts: Alenizi 4

Al-Gharafa Sports Club Multi-Purpose Hall, Doha
Referees:
Saif Al Dossari
Aryan Jamshidi
Craig Copes

14 June 2022
15:45

Boxscore

Japan	73–67	Philippines
Scoring by quarter: 17–14, 18–10, 14–14, 24–29
Pts: Kawashima 26; Rebs: Kawashima 18; Asts: Ishiguchi 7		Pts: Harris 18; Rebs: four players 6 Asts: Bahay 3

Al-Gharafa Sports Club Multi-Purpose Hall, Doha
Referees:
Rakesh Ramalingaiah
Claude Abi Gebrael
Bandar Jassim Al Suwaidi

=== Group D ===
Pos	Team	Pld	W	L	PF	PA	PD	Pts	Qualification
1	South Korea	2	2	0	168	132	+36	4	Advanced to Quarterfinals Round
2	New Zealand	2	1	1	165	146	+19	3	Proceeded to Playoffs Round
3	Kazakhstan	2	0	2	126	181	−55	2	Proceeded to Playoffs Round

Source: FIBA
Rules for classification: 1) Points; 2) Head-to-head results; 3) Points difference; 4) Points scored.

12 June 2022
11:15

Boxscore

Kazakhstan	67–92	New Zealand
Scoring by quarter: 18–19, 16–30, 16–20, 17–23
Pts: Severgin 28; Rebs: Khangereyev, Kuantayev 4 Asts: Mukhazhanov 4		Pts: Book 25; Rebs: Halaifonua 10; Asts: Matakatea, Trego 4

Al-Gharafa Sports Club Multi-Purpose Hall, Doha
Referees:
Saif Al Dossari
Adel Mohamed Ghuloom
Aryan Jamshidi

13 June 2022
11:15

Boxscore

South Korea	89–59	Kazakhstan
Scoring by quarter: 23–19, 17–3, 30–17, 19–20
Pts: Kang T.H., Kim S.W. Rebs: Ku M.Y. 9 Asts: Lee G.W. 6		Pts: Mukhazhanov 12; Rebs: Severgin 10; Asts: Severgin 5

Al-Gharafa Sports Club Multi-Purpose Hall, Doha
Referees:
Claude Abi Gebrael
Adel Mohamed Ghuloom
Rendra Lesmana

14 June 2022
13:30

Boxscore

New Zealand	73–79 (OT)	South Korea
Scoring by quarter: 15–18, 21–11, 19–26, 11–11, Overtime: 7–13
Pts: Halaifonua 16; Rebs: Halaifonua 17; Asts: Halaifonua 4		Pts: Lee 20; Rebs: Ku 10; Asts: Ko 3

Al-Gharafa Sports Club Multi-Purpose Hall, Doha
Referees:
Saif Al Dossari
Adel Mohamed Ghuloom
Aryan Jamshidi

== Final round ==
=== Bracket ===
Playoffs
Philippines	83
Kazakhstan	60
Lebanon	78
Qatar	54
New Zealand	107
Kuwait	57
India	97
Indonesia	53

Quarterfinals
Australia	109
Philippines	83
South Korea	64
Lebanon	72
Iran	66
New Zealand	72
Japan	91
India	84

Semifinals
Australia	85
Lebanon	51
New Zealand	79
Japan	99

Gold Medal Game
Australia	94
Japan	63
Bronze Medal Game
Lebanon	62
New Zealand	89

Classification 5th–8th

Classification Semifinals
Philippines	77
South Korea	88
Iran	78
India	83

Fifth Place Game
South Korea	80
India	90
Seventh Place Game
Philippines	95
Iran	87

=== Qualification to Quarterfinals ===
16 June 2022
13:30

Boxscore

New Zealand	107–57	Kuwait
Scoring by quarter: 21–15, 24–17, 41–9, 21–16
Pts: Book 17; Rebs: Book, Halaifonua 10; Asts: Berridge 5		Pts: Alsaied, Alhusaini 17; Rebs: Alhusaini 4 Asts: Asadallah 3

Al-Gharafa Sports Club Multi-Purpose Hall, Doha
Referees: Rakesh Ramalingaiah (IND), Bandar Al Suwaidi (QAT), Rendra Lesmana (INA)

16 June 2022
15:45

Boxscore

Philippines	83–60	Kazakhstan
Scoring by quarter: 26–17, 27–18, 20–16, 10–9
Pts: Competente 15; Rebs: three players 9 Asts: Harris 7		Pts: Severgin 24; Rebs: Severgin 9 Asts: Severgin 3

Al-Gharafa Sports Club Multi-Purpose Hall, Doha
Referees: Saif Al Dossari (QAT), Adel Ghuloom (BHR), Claude Abi Gebrael (LBN)

16 June 2022
18:00

Boxscore

India	97–53	Indonesia
Scoring by quarter: 20–18, 23–11, 27–8, 27–16
Pts: L. Singh 30; Rebs: L. Singh 17; Asts: Dagar 9		Pts: Wijaya 16; Rebs: Abhyasa, Putra 6 Asts: Leonard 4

Al-Gharafa Sports Club Multi-Purpose Hall, Doha
Referees: Ahmed Hassan Al Khamees (KSA), Craig Copes (AUS), Aryan Jamshidi (IRN)

16 June 2022
20:15

Boxscore

Lebanon	78–54	Qatar
Scoring by quarter: 20–9, 17–13, 20–14, 21–18
Pts: Hachem 17; Rebs: Zamatta 9 Asts: Hachem 8		Pts: Moh. Ndao 18; Rebs: Mou. Ndao 15; Asts: Mou. Ndao 5

Al-Gharafa Sports Club Multi-Purpose Hall, Doha
Referees: Yevgeniy Mikheyev (KAZ), Callum Welch (NZL), Mohammed Hasan Fanharawi (IRQ)

=== Quarterfinals ===
17 June 2022
13:30

Boxscore

Australia	109–83	Philippines
Scoring by quarter: 24–29, 23–22, 29–17, 33–15
Pts: Savage 27; Rebs: Dent 10; Asts: Dent 8		Pts: Competente 18; Rebs: Mahmood 8 Asts: Bahay 3

Al-Gharafa Sports Club Multi-Purpose Hall, Doha
Referees: Saif Al Dossari (QAT), Haruga Iwai (JPN), Rendra Lesmana (INA)

17 June 2022
15:45

Boxscore

Japan	91–84	India
Scoring by quarter: 26–16, 21–19, 21–28, 23–21
Pts: Kawashima 32; Rebs: Kawashima 17; Asts: Ishiguchi 7		Pts: K. Singh 31; Rebs: K. Singh, J. Singh 9 Asts: Rathore 4

Al-Gharafa Sports Club Multi-Purpose Hall, Doha
Referees: Khaled Alshammari (KUW), Bandar Al Suwaidi (QAT), Rashid Al Musheifri (OMN)

17 June 2022
18:00

Boxscore

Iran	66–72	New Zealand
Scoring by quarter: 12–17, 15–23, 19–17, 20–15
Pts: Khosravi 26; Rebs: Amini 15; Asts: Khosravi 3		Pts: Book, Matakatea 17; Rebs: Halaifonua 9 Asts: three players 4

Al-Gharafa Sports Club Multi-Purpose Hall, Doha
Referees: Yevgeniy Mikheyev (KAZ), Lee Seungmu (KOR), Mohammed Hasan Fanharawi (IRQ)

17 June 2022
20:15

Boxscore

South Korea	64–72	Lebanon
Scoring by quarter: 20–21, 18–18, 17–16, 9–17
Pts: Kim, Ku 19; Rebs: Ku 11; Asts: Ko 4		Pts: Zamatta 24; Rebs: Zamatta 21; Asts: Azzi 4

Al-Gharafa Sports Club Multi-Purpose Hall, Doha
Referees: Ahmed Hassan Al Khamees (SAU), Adel Mohamed Ghuloom (BHR), Reynante Hufana (PHI)

=== 5–8th place semifinals ===
18 June 2022
13:30

Boxscore

Philippines	77–88	South Korea
Scoring by quarter: 16–20, 16–19, 25–22, 20–27
Pts: Bahay 25; Rebs: Harris, Mahmood 6 Asts: Bahay 9		Pts: Lee Y. 17; Rebs: Lee Y. 6 Asts: Ku 7

Al-Gharafa Sports Club Multi-Purpose Hall, Doha
Referees: Callum Welch (NZL), Bandar Jassim Al Suwaidi (QAT), Adel Mohamed Ghuloom (BHR)

18 June 2022
15:45

Boxscore

Iran	78–83 (OT)	India
Scoring by quarter: 19–10, 21–10, 13–31, 17–19, Overtime: 8-13
Pts: Amini 27; Rebs: Khosravi 15; Asts: Amini 7		Pts: Dagar 25; Rebs: L. Singh 18; Asts: L. Singh 6

Al-Gharafa Sports Club Multi-Purpose Hall, Doha
Referees: Haruga Iwai (JPN), Craig Copes (AUS), Claude Abi Gebrael (LBN)

=== Semifinals ===
18 June 2022
18:00

Boxscore

New Zealand	79–99	Japan
Scoring by quarter: 13–29, 18–25, 23–19, 25–26
Pts: Book 25; Rebs: Book 12; Asts: Berridge 4		Pts: Kawashima 38; Rebs: Kawashima 7 Asts: Ishiguchi 9

Al-Gharafa Sports Club Multi-Purpose Hall, Doha
Referees: Yevgeniy Mikheyev (KAZ), Lee Seung-mu (KOR), Khaled AlShammari (KUW)

18 June 2022
20:15

Boxscore

Australia	85–51	Lebanon
Scoring by quarter: 23–7, 18–16, 20–15, 24–13
Pts: Furphy 15; Rebs: Zikarsky 9 Asts: five players 2		Pts: Sleiman 10; Rebs: El Shamee, Tabbara 4 Asts: Azzi, Hachem 3

Al-Gharafa Sports Club Multi-Purpose Hall, Doha
Referees: Saif Al Dossari (QAT), Aryan Jamshidi (IRN), Ahmed Hassan Al Khamees (SAU)

=== Seventh place game ===
19 June 2022
13:30

Boxscore

Philippines	95–87	Iran
Scoring by quarter: 20–18, 19–30, 29–15, 27–24
Pts: Konov 18; Rebs: Bahay, Harris 6 Asts: Bahay 7		Pts: Khosravi 28; Rebs: Mirjalalifilabi 8 Asts: Jafari 4

Al-Gharafa Sports Club Multi-Purpose Hall, Doha
Referees: Callum Welch (NZL), Khaled AlShammari (KUW), Rendra Lesmana (INA)

=== Fifth place game ===
19 June 2022
15:45

Boxscore

South Korea	80–90	India
Scoring by quarter: 19–30, 14–15, 20–26, 27–19
Pts: Ku 17; Rebs: Ko 8 Asts: Ko 6		Pts: L. Singh 29; Rebs: L. Singh 20; Asts: Rathore 8

Al-Gharafa Sports Club Multi-Purpose Hall, Doha
Referees: Craig Copes (AUS), Aryan Jamshidi (IRN), Claude Abi Gebrael (LBN)

=== Third place game ===
19 June 2022
18:00

Boxscore

Lebanon	62–89	New Zealand
Scoring by quarter: 10–28, 13–23, 24–17, 15–21
Pts: El Shamee, Choueiri 12; Rebs: three players 5 Asts: Hachem 5		Pts: Book 17; Rebs: Book 10; Asts: Matakatea 4

Al-Gharafa Sports Club Multi-Purpose Hall, Doha
Referees: Haruga Iwai (JPN), Ahmed Hassan Al Khamees (SAU), Mohammed Hasan Fanharawi (IRQ)

=== Final ===
19 June 2022
20:15

Boxscore

Australia	94–63	Japan
Scoring by quarter: 19–14, 22–18, 24–15, 29–16
Pts: Siulepa 18; Rebs: O'Donnell 12; Asts: Dent 5		Pts: Kawashima 23; Rebs: Kawashima 7 Asts: three players 2

Al-Gharafa Sports Club Multi-Purpose Hall, Doha
Referees: Yevgeniy Mikheyev (KAZ), Saif Al Dossari (QAT), Lee Seung-mu (KOR)

== Qualified teams for FIBA U17 Basketball World Cup ==
The following four teams from FIBA Asia qualified for the 2022 FIBA Under-17 Basketball World Cup.

Team	Qualified on	Previous appearances in FIBA Under-17 Basketball World Cup^{1}
Australia	17 June 2022	5 (2010, 2012, 2014, 2016, 2018)
Japan	17 June 2022	1 (2014)
New Zealand	17 June 2022	1 (2018)
Lebanon	17 June 2022	0 (debut)

== Final ranking ==
Qualified for the 2022 FIBA Under-17 Basketball World Cup.

Rank	Team	Record
1st place, gold medalist(s)	Australia	6–0
2nd place, silver medalist(s)	Japan	4–1
3rd place, bronze medalist(s)	New Zealand	4–2
4	Lebanon	3–3
5	India	5–2
6	South Korea	3–2
7	Philippines	3–3
8	Iran	2–3
9	Qatar	1–3
10	Kazakhstan	0–3
11	Indonesia	0–3
12	Kuwait	0–3
13	Bahrain	0–3

== Awards ==
2022 Asian Under-16 champions

Australia
Second title

=== All-Tournament Team ===
- C (Australia) Rocco Zikarsky
- F (India) Kushal Singh
- F (Japan) Yuto Kawashima (MVP)
- G (New Zealand) Nic Book
- G (Japan) Suguru Ishiguchi
