= FIBA Under-17 Basketball World Cup Most Valuable Player =

Youth basketball award

The FIBA Under-17 Basketball World Cup Most Valuable Player is a biennial award, that is given by FIBA, to the Most Valuable Player of the FIBA Under-17 World Cup.

== Winners ==
| | Denotes player whose team won that years tournament |
| | Denotes player inducted into the FIBA Hall of Fame |
| | Denotes player who is still active |
| Player (X) | Denotes the number of times the player had been named MVP at that time |
| Team (X) | Denotes the number of times a player from this team had won at that time |

| Year | Player | Position | Team | Ref. |
|---|---|---|---|---|
| 2010 | Bradley Beal | Guard/Forward | United States | |
| 2012 | Jahlil Okafor | Center | United States (2) | |
| 2014 | Malik Newman | Guard | United States (3) | |
| 2016 | Collin Sexton | Guard | United States (4) | |
| 2018 | Jalen Green | Guard | United States (5) | |
| 2022 | Izan Almansa | Center | Spain | |
| 2024 | Cameron Boozer | Forward | United States (6) | |
| 2026 | Joaquim Boumtje-Boumtje | Center | United States (7) | |
