= Izan Almansa =

Spanish basketball player (born 2005)

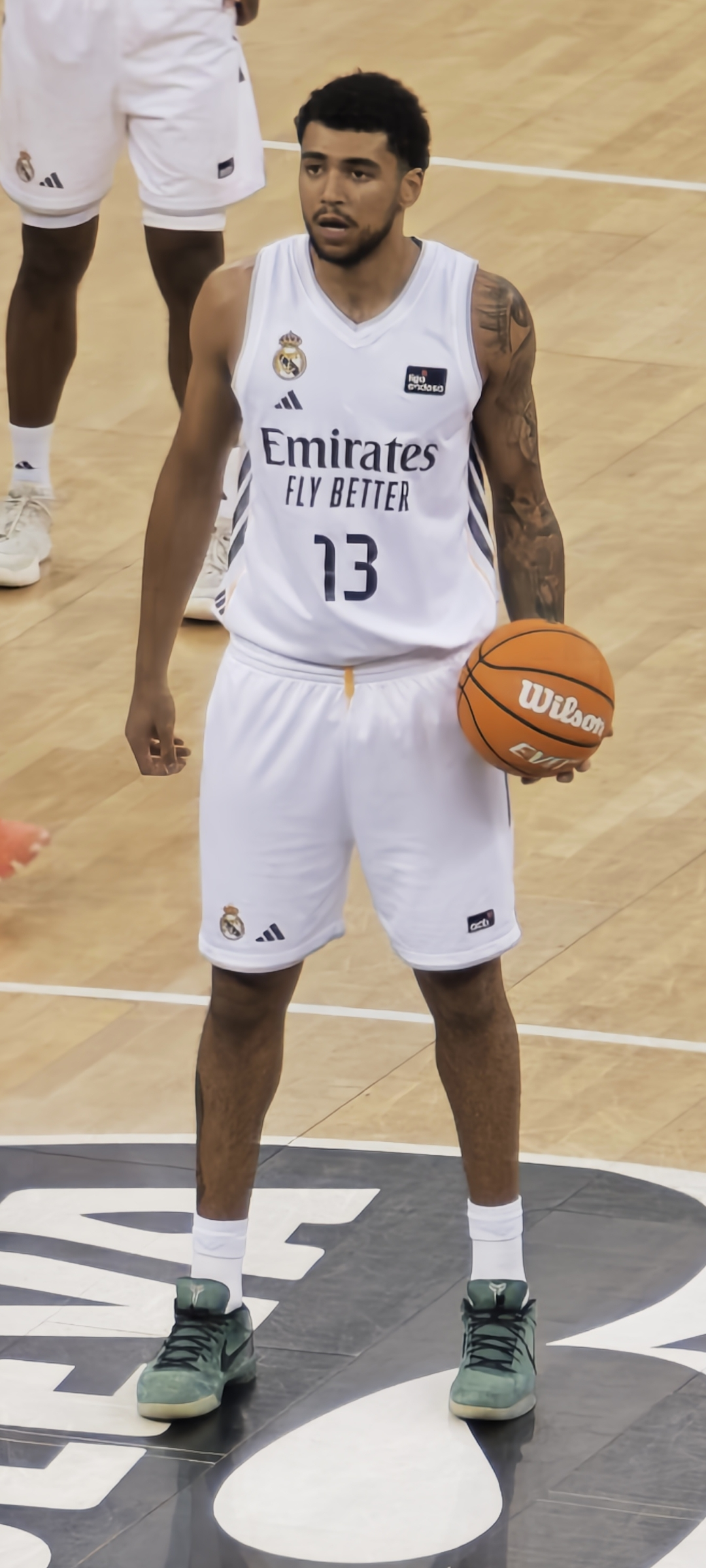
- Almansa with Real Madrid in 2025

No. 13 – Gonzaga Bulldogs
- Position: Center / power forward
- Conference: Pac-12 Conference

Personal information
- Born: 7 June 2005 (age 21) Murcia, Spain
- Listed height: 6 ft 10 in (2.08 m)
- Listed weight: 225 lb (102 kg)

Career information
- College: Gonzaga (2026–present)
- NBA draft: 2025: undrafted
- Playing career: 2020–2026

Career history
- 2020–2021: Real Madrid B
- 2021–2022: Team OTE
- 2022–2023: YNG Dreamerz
- 2023–2024: NBA G League Ignite
- 2024–2025: Perth Wildcats
- 2025–2026: Real Madrid

Career highlights
- All-Liga ACB Young Players Team (2026); NBA Rising Stars Game (2024); NBA G League Next Up Game (2024); FIBA Under-19 World Cup MVP (2023); FIBA Under-17 World Cup MVP (2022); FIBA U18 EuroBasket MVP (2022)
- Stats at Basketball Reference
Medals
Men's basketball
Representing Spain
FIBA U19 World Cup
Gold medal – first place	2023 Hungary	Team
FIBA U17 World Cup
Silver medal – second place	2022 Spain	Team
FIBA U18 EuroBasket
Gold medal – first place	2022 Turkey	Team

Izan Almansa Pérez (born 7 June 2005) is a Spanish college basketball player for the Gonzaga Bulldogs of the Pac-12 Conference. He represents the Spain national team internationally.

== Early life and youth career ==
Almansa was born in Murcia, Spain, to Cristina Almansa, a Murcia native, and Steve Horton, an American professional basketball player for CB Murcia. Horton returned to the United States after his retirement from playing. Almansa grew up in Spain playing association football and dreamed of playing it professionally. He did not begin to play basketball until he was nine years old, following a friend who had signed up. Almansa initially joined the UCAM Murcia youth ranks and measured 1.85 m (6 ft 1 in) by age 12. In his final year with UCAM, he led the Infantil (under-14) squad to a sixth-place finish at the Spanish National Championship – the club's best performance ever at the Infantil level – while averaging 18 points and 18 rebounds per game. In a group stage victory over La Salle Laguna, he recorded 32 points, 28 rebounds, and six steals.

In the summer of 2019, Almansa was recruited by Real Madrid. He went on to play two years with the Real Madrid Cadete (under-16) team. Almansa also played three games with the Real Madrid reserves in the fourth-tier Liga EBA during the 2020–21 season.

== College career ==
On 12 May 2026, Almansa committed to playing college basketball at Gonzaga University, though the move was reportedly "far from official" due to "complex eligibility issues". He arrived on campus in mid-2026 for summer workouts with the Bulldogs. Almansa was officially added to Gonzaga's roster on September 28, despite not yet having received an eligibility waiver from the NCAA.

== Professional career ==
=== Team OTE (2021–2022) ===
On 5 August 2021, Almansa signed with the Overtime Elite (OTE), a professional basketball league for high school-aged players, ahead of its inaugural season. In the 2021–22 season, he played for Team OTE against the other two OTE teams, as well as prep schools and postgraduate teams. Almansa averaged 6.4 points and 5.0 rebounds per game while shooting 50.4 percent from the field and 36.4 percent from three-point range.

=== YNG Dreamerz (2022–2023) ===
Ahead of the 2022–23 OTE season, Almansa was drafted by the YNG Dreamerz, one of six teams in a restructured league. In his second season in the competition, he averaged 9.3 points and 8.6 rebounds per game, finishing fifth in the league in the latter category. In the final regular-season game, Almansa recorded 21 points, 10 rebounds and six assists to clinch the second seed. He helped his team reach the championship series, where they lost to the City Reapers, led by twins Amen and Ausar Thompson.

=== NBA G League Ignite (2023–2024) ===
On 30 June 2023, Almansa signed with the NBA G League Ignite. In his team debut on 10 November, he recorded seven points, seven rebounds, two blocks and two steals in a 107–102 loss to the Ontario Clippers. Almansa recorded his first double-double two weeks later against the South Bay Lakers, putting up 22 points and 10 rebounds in 27 minutes. He was chosen to compete in both the Rising Stars Challenge and the G League Next Up Game at the 2024 NBA All-Star Weekend in Indianapolis. In 48 games with the Ignite, Almansa averaged 10.5 points, 7.2 rebounds, and 1.5 assists per game on 54.3 percent shooting.

On 23 April 2024, Almansa announced that he had declared for the 2024 NBA draft; his entry was confirmed by the NBA on 2 May. However, he subsequently withdrew his name on 16 June to explore options in Europe and Australia.

=== Perth Wildcats (2024–2025) ===
On 29 June 2024, Almansa signed with the Perth Wildcats of the Australian National Basketball League (NBL), joining the team as part of the league's Next Stars program for the 2024–25 season. He averaged 6.9 points and 3.9 rebounds on 51.1 per cent shooting in 33 games.

In April 2025, Almansa declared for the NBA draft. After testing positive for cannabis following a game with the Wildcats on 1 December 2024, Basketball Australia imposed a one-month ban on Almansa, which he served from 7 April to 6 May 2025.

=== NBA draft and Summer League ===
Following the first round of the 2025 NBA draft, Almansa was invited to the green room for the second round the next day. He was the only one of 12 prospects in the green room for the second round who did not get drafted. Almansa subsequently signed an Exhibit 10 contract with the Philadelphia 76ers and joined the team for the 2025 NBA Summer League.

=== Real Madrid (2025–2026) ===
In August 2025, Almansa returned to Real Madrid on a contract until 30 June 2029. He averaged 5.1 points and 2.3 rebounds in 10 minutes per game in Liga ACB play and made three EuroLeague appearances. Almansa departed from the club via mutual consent on 20 August 2026, allowing him to join the Gonzaga Bulldogs.

== National team career ==
=== Junior national team ===
Almansa was selected to play at the 2021 FIBA U16 European Challengers, though Spain later withdrew from the tournament.

Almansa led the national under-17 team to a silver-medal finish at the 2022 FIBA U17 World Cup in Spain, which was their first-ever medal at the event. He averaged 12.1 points, 11.9 rebounds, 1.6 assists, 1.6 blocks and 1.1 steals per game on 55.7 percent shooting and was named the tournament MVP – the first non-American player to ever win the award. Spain lost in the final to the United States, with Almansa recording nine points, 15 rebounds, two assists and two steals in the 79–67 defeat.

Just a few weeks after the U17 World Cup, Almansa represented the national under-18 team at the 2022 FIBA U18 European Championship in Turkey. He averaged 15.7 points, 10.7 rebounds, 1.6 steals, and 1.1 blocks in 25 minutes per game, leading Spain to a gold medal and winning tournament MVP honors once again. He became the first player to ever win tournament MVP awards at both the FIBA U17 World Cup and the FIBA U18 European Championship.

=== Senior national team ===
In November 2024, Almansa was named in a Spanish senior national team squad for a pair of FIBA EuroBasket qualifier games against Slovakia.

== Personal life ==
Almansa received the Princess Leonor Award – given to the best under-18 Spanish athlete – from the King of Spain, Felipe VI, at the 2022 Premios Nacionales del Deporte.

In 2023, Almansa enrolled at the Universidad Católica San Antonio de Murcia to pursue his Bachelor of Business Administration through an online program specially developed for athletes in concert with the Spanish Olympic Committee.
