= Yuto Kawashima =

Japanese basketball player (born 2005)

Seattle University
- Position: Power forward

Personal information
- Born: 27 May 2005 (age 21) Gunma Prefecture, Japan
- Listed height: 200 cm (6 ft 7 in)
- Listed weight: 99 kg (218 lb)

Career information
- College: Seattle University
Medals
Men's basketball
Representing Japan
Asian Games
Silver medal – second place	2026 Aichi-Nagoya	Men's tournament

Yuto Kawashima (Japanese: 川島 悠翔; born 27 May 2005) is a Japanese basketball player who plays as a power forward for Seattle University. He has represented Japan at multiple international youth competitions and at the Asian Games. Kawashima was a member of the Japan team that won the silver medal in the men's tournament at the 2026 Asian Games.

== Early life and education ==
Kawashima was born in Gunma Prefecture, Japan. He attended Fukuoka University Ohori High School before joining the NBA Global Academy in Australia in 2022. He subsequently enrolled at Seattle University.

== Youth career ==
Kawashima represented Japan at the 2022 FIBA Under-16 Asian Championship. He was named the tournament's Most Valuable Player and selected to the All-Tournament Team as Japan finished as runners-up.

Later in 2022, Kawashima played at the 2022 FIBA Under-17 Basketball World Cup. He averaged 19.1 points, 6.7 rebounds and 1.9 assists per game, ranking second in the tournament in scoring.

He also represented Japan at the 2022 FIBA Under-18 Asian Championship and was selected to the tournament's All-Tournament Team.

== International career ==
Kawashima was selected for Japan's men's basketball team at the 2022 Asian Games, which were held in 2023 in Hangzhou, China. Japan finished eighth in the tournament.

At the 2023 FIBA Under-19 Basketball World Cup, Kawashima again represented Japan at youth international level. He subsequently became part of Japan's senior national-team setup and played in the 2025 FIBA Asia Cup qualification campaign.

In 2026, Kawashima was selected for Japan's men's basketball team for the 2026 Asian Games in Aichi-Nagoya. He was listed as a 200 cm power forward representing Seattle University.

Kawashima started for Japan in the men's final against South Korea. Japan lost the final and won the silver medal. Kawashima later described the medal as a source of pride despite his disappointment with his performance in the final.
