= Viktor Mikić =

Serbian basketball player (born 2005)

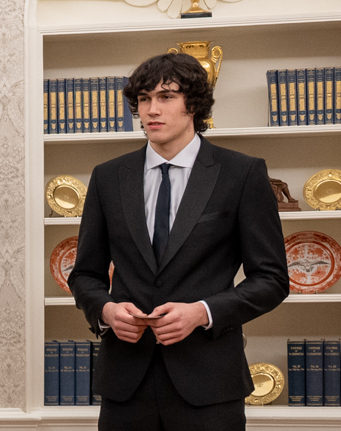
- Mikić in 2025

No. 12 – Florida Gators
- Position: Center
- League: Southeastern Conference

Personal information
- Born: September 14, 2005 (age 21) Belgrade, Serbia and Montenegro
- Listed height: 6 ft 11 in (2.11 m)
- Listed weight: 250 lb (113 kg)

Career information
- High school: Hamilton Heights (Chattanooga, Tennessee)
- College: Florida (2024–present)

Career history
- 2022–2023: Partizan
- 2022: →Dunav

Career highlights
- NCAA champion (2025)

Viktor Mikić (Serbian Cyrillic: Виктор Микић; born 14 September 2005) is a Serbian college basketball player for the Florida Gators of the Southeastern Conference (SEC).

Mikić is the first Serbian basketball player in history to win the NCAA championship.

== Professional career ==
On 15 February 2023, Mikić made his professional debut for Partizan in a Radivoj Korać Cup match against Spartak Subotica. He did not score any points.

== National team career ==
He represented the Serbia national under-17 basketball team at the 2022 FIBA Under-17 Basketball World Cup. He averaged 9.6 points and 8.2 rebounds per game.
