= Rocco Zikarsky =

Australian basketball player (born 2006)

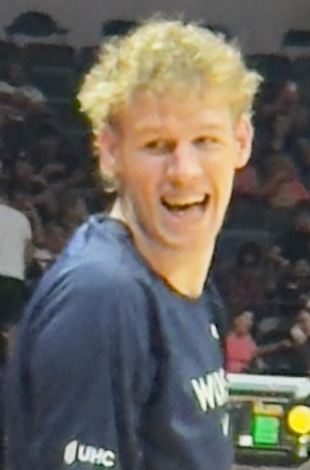
- Zikarsky before a preseason game in 2025

No. 44 – Minnesota Timberwolves
- Position: Center
- League: NBA

Personal information
- Born: 11 July 2006 (age 20) Sunshine Coast, Queensland, Australia
- Listed height: 7 ft 3 in (2.21 m)
- Listed weight: 227 lb (103 kg)

Career information
- High school: Brisbane Grammar School (Brisbane, Queensland)
- NBA draft: 2025: 2nd round, 45th overall pick
- Drafted by: Chicago Bulls
- Playing career: 2023–present

Career history
- 2023: BA Centre of Excellence
- 2023–2025: Brisbane Bullets
- 2025–present: Minnesota Timberwolves
- 2025–present: →Iowa Wolves
- Stats at NBA.com
- Stats at Basketball Reference

Rocco Zikarsky (born 11 July 2006) is an Australian professional basketball player for the Minnesota Timberwolves of the National Basketball Association (NBA), on a two-way contract with the Iowa Wolves of the NBA G League. He previously played for the Brisbane Bullets of the National Basketball League (NBL). He was drafted by the Chicago Bulls in the second round of the 2025 NBA draft.

== Early life and career ==
Zikarsky was born in Hurstville (Sydney), New South Wales to German Olympic medal-winning swimmer Björn Zikarsky and Australian champion ironwoman Kylie Zikarsky. He grew up on the Sunshine Coast, Queensland, excelled in Queensland representative teams and was a standout player at the NBA Global Academy in Canberra. He attended Brisbane Grammar School throughout his early teenage years. He has 3 siblings, Ruben, Jade and Lennox. He is the nephew of Bengt Zikarsky.

In 2023, Zikarsky played for the BA Centre of Excellence in the NBL1 East, averaging 9.9 points, six rebounds, and 2.3 blocks in seven games.

== Professional career ==
On 7 July 2023, Zikarsky signed with the Brisbane Bullets of the National Basketball League (NBL) as part of the NBL's Next Stars program. At 16 years old, he became the youngest player in the program's history. On 7 January 2024, he had six points and four blocks in 10 and-a-half minutes against the Sydney Kings. He played in 27 of the Bullets' 28 games in the 2023–24 season, averaging 3.2 points, 2.1 rebounds and one block on 59.7% shooting in seven minutes per game.

Zikarsky returned to the Bullets for the 2024–25 NBL season, entering his second season as one of the top prospects for the 2025 NBA draft. In the Bullets' season opener, Zikarsky played six minutes, scored four points and grabbed three rebounds. He struggled to break into the starting lineup ahead of fellow centre Tyrell Harrison. On 29 November 2024, he made his first NBL start with Harrison out with illness, recording thirteen points, eight rebounds and three blocks in a 117–89 loss to the Perth Wildcats.

Zikarsky declared his eligibility for the 2025 NBA draft on 30 April 2025 and later attended the NBA draft combine. He was selected with the 45th overall pick by the Chicago Bulls. His draft rights were then immediately traded to the Minnesota Timberwolves. On July 9, 2025, he signed a two-way contract with the Timberwolves. In his pre-season debut against the Denver Nuggets, he recorded 9 points, 8 rebounds and 1 steal in 13 minutes of play. On February 22, 2026, Zikarsky made his official NBA debut against the Philadelphia 76ers, where he logged in one rebound in four minutes of gameplay in a 135-108 loss to the 76ers.

== National team career ==
In 2022, Zikarsky played for Australia at the FIBA U16 Asian Championship and the FIBA U17 Basketball World Cup. In 2024, he led Australia to victory at the Albert Schweitzer-Tournament, earning MVP honours. He averaged 18.7 points, 11 rebounds, and 2.9 blocks in 26 minutes per game on 73.1% shooting.

Zikarsky debuted for the Australian Boomers during the FIBA Asia Cup 2025 Qualifiers.

== Career statistics ==
Legend
GP	Games played	GS	Games started	MPG	Minutes per game
FG%	Field goal percentage	3P%	3-point field goal percentage	FT%	Free throw percentage
RPG	Rebounds per game	APG	Assists per game	SPG	Steals per game
BPG	Blocks per game	PPG	Points per game	**Bold**	Career high

=== NBA ===
Year	Team	GP	GS	MPG	FG%	3P%	FT%	RPG	APG	SPG	BPG	PPG
2025–26	Minnesota	5	0	7.2	.625	—	1.000	2.8	.4	.0	1.0	2.8
Career		5	0	7.2	.625	—	1.000	2.8	.4	.0	1.0	2.8

=== NBL ===
Year	Team	GP	GS	MPG	FG%	3P%	FT%	RPG	APG	SPG	BPG	PPG
2023–24	Brisbane	**27**	0	7.0	**.597**	.000	.500	2.1	.1	.1	**1.0**	3.2
2024–25	Brisbane	18	**1**	**11.8**	.524	**.200**	**.571**	**3.4**	**.3**	**.3**	.6	**4.6**

== See also ==
- List of tallest players in NBA history
