= Ian Jackson (basketball) =

American basketball player (born 2005)

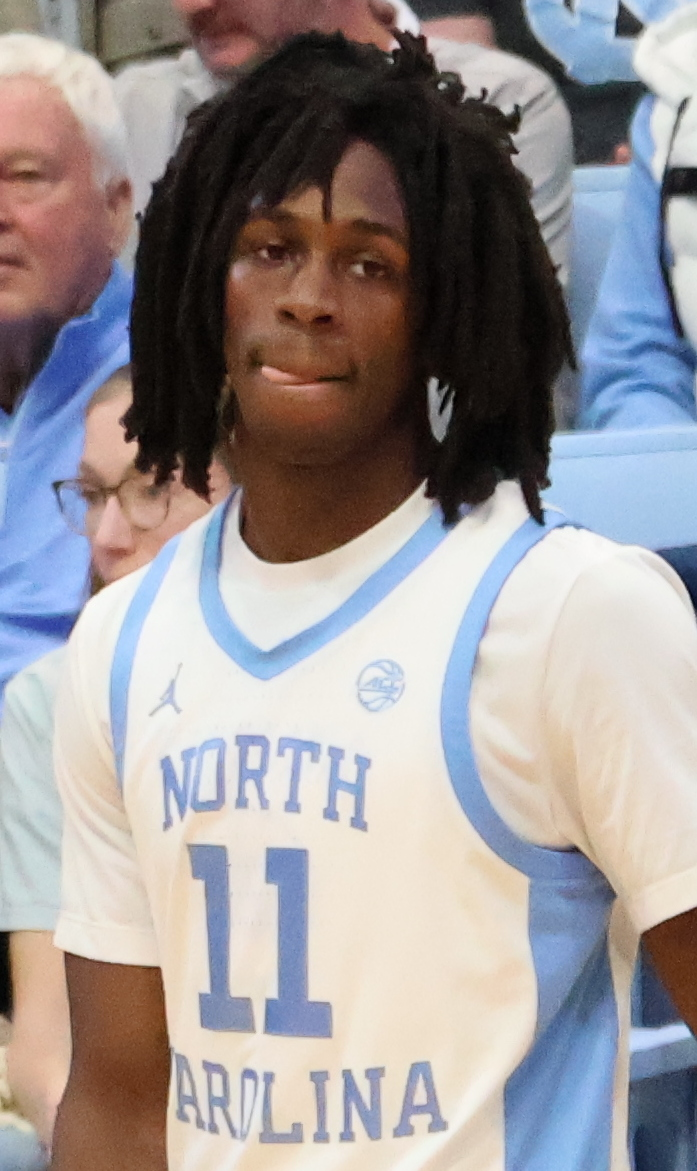
- Jackson with North Carolina in 2025

No. 11 – St. John's Red Storm
- Position: Shooting guard
- League: Big East Conference

Personal information
- Born: February 14, 2005 (age 21) Harlem, New York, U.S.
- Listed height: 6 ft 5 in (1.96 m)
- Listed weight: 195 lb (88 kg)

Career information
- High school: Cardinal Hayes (The Bronx, New York); Our Saviour Lutheran (The Bronx, New York)
- College: North Carolina (2024–2025); St. John's (2025–present)

Career highlights
- ACC All-Freshman Team (2025); McDonald's All-American (2024); Nike Hoop Summit (2024)
Medals
Men's basketball
Representing United States
FIBA Under-17 Basketball World Cup
Gold medal – first place	2022 Spain	Team
FIBA Americas Under-16 Championship
Gold medal – first place	2021 Mexico	Team

Ian Jalen Patrick Jackson (born February 14, 2005) is an American college basketball player for the St. John's Red Storm of the Big East Conference. He previously played for the North Carolina Tar Heels.

== Early life and high school career ==
Jackson was born in Harlem, New York and grew up in The Bronx, New York and initially attended Cardinal Hayes High School. He was named the National Sophomore of the Year by MaxPreps after averaging 19.8 points, five rebounds, and four assists per game. Jackson transferred to Our Saviour Lutheran School before the start of his senior year. He also announced he would simultaneously compete in Overtime Elite (OTE) as a non-professional player for the JellyFam team. Jackson was named first-team All-OTE at the end of the season. He was selected to play in the 2024 McDonald's All-American Boys Game.

=== Recruiting ===
Jackson was a consensus five-star recruit and one of the top players in the 2024 class, according to major recruiting services. He committed to play college basketball at North Carolina over offers from Kentucky, Arkansas, LSU, and Oregon.

== College career ==
On December 30, 2024, Jackson was named the ACC Rookie of the Week after making his first college start and scoring a season high 26 points in a game against Campbell University.

In February 2025, Jackson was named one of the top candidates for the 2025 Julius Erving Small Forward of the Year Award.

== National team career ==
Jackson played for the United States national under-16 team at the 2021 FIBA Under-16 Americas Championship. The following summer, he played for the under-17 team at the 2022 FIBA Under-17 Basketball World Cup. Jackson was also named to the United States' roster for the 2023 FIBA Under-19 Basketball World Cup.

== Personal life ==
Jackson is the son of Dwight Jackson and Latisha Simon. He is one of seven brothers.
