= Jan Vide =

Slovenian basketball player

No. 37 – Virginia Cavaliers
- Position: Shooting guard / small forward
- League: Atlantic Coast Conference

Personal information
- Born: 15 January 2004 (age 22) Domžale, Slovenia
- Listed height: 6 ft 6 in (1.98 m)
- Listed weight: 200 lb (91 kg)

Career information
- College: UCLA (2023–2024); Loyola Marymount (2024–2026); Virginia (2026–present)
- Playing career: 2020–present

Career history
- 2020–2023: Real Madrid B

Career highlights
- EB Next Generation Tournament MVP (2023)

Jan Vide (born 15 January 2004) is a Slovenian college basketball player for the Virginia Cavaliers of the Atlantic Coast Conference. He previously played for the UCLA Bruins and the Loyola Marymount Lions.

== Early life and career ==
Vide grew up in Domžale, Slovenia and played for the youth team of Helios Suns. He began playing for the Under-18 team of Real Madrid in 2020 at the age of 14. He was named the MVP of the 2022–23 Euroleague Basketball Next Generation Tournament. Vide attended SEK-El Castillo International School while playing for Real Madrid.

== College career ==
Vide committed to playing college basketball in the United States for UCLA. He averaged 1.9 points, 0.8 rebounds, and 0.5 assists over 24 games during his freshman season. After the end of the season, Vide entered the NCAA transfer portal.

Vide transferred to Loyola Marymount. In his first season with the Lions, he played in 32 games off the bench and averaged averaged 6.3 points and 2.4 assists. As a junior, Vide averaged 12.1 points and 4.0 assists per game.

After his junior season, Vide transferred a second time to Virginia.

== National team career ==
Vide was named to the Slovenia under-17 national team and played in the 2022 FIBA U18 European Championship where he averaged a tournament-high 20.1 points per game. Vide was also selected to play for Slovenia in the 2023 FIBA Under-19 Basketball World Cup. He averaged 17.9 points, 3.7 rebounds, and 1.6 steals per game as Slovenia finished in ninth place.
