= Julius Halaifonua =

New Zealand basketball player (born 2006)

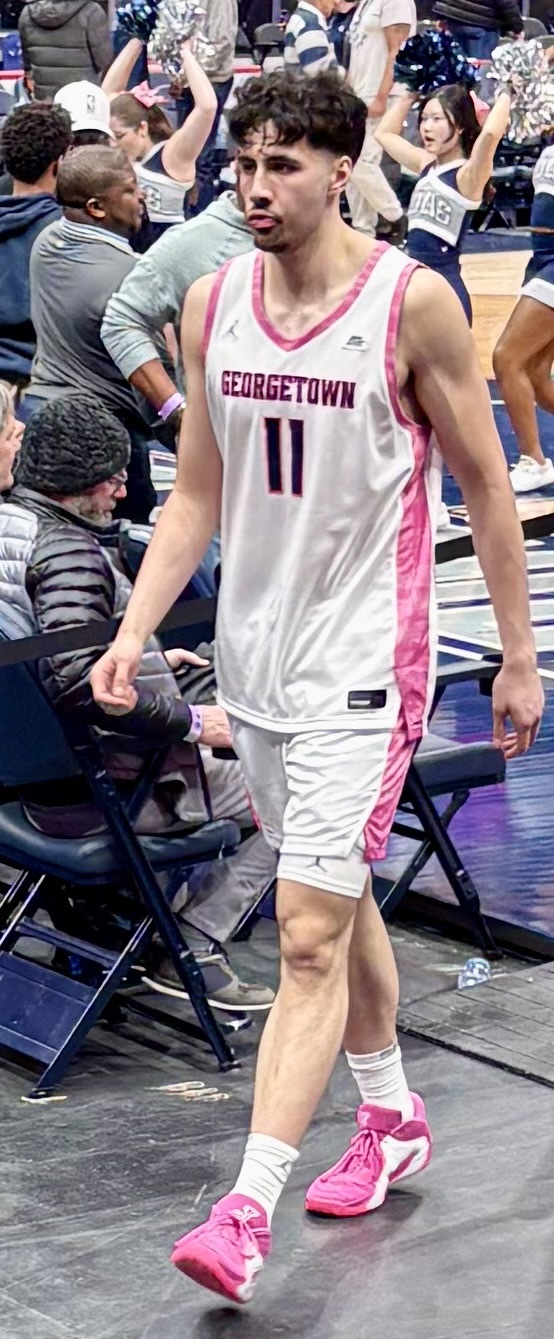
- Halaifonua at Georgetown in 2026

No. 25 – Oklahoma State Cowboys
- Position: Center
- Conference: Big 12 Conference

Personal information
- Born: 9 May 2006 (age 20) Auckland, New Zealand
- Listed height: 7 ft 0 in (2.13 m)
- Listed weight: 259 lb (117 kg)

Career information
- High school: Rosmini College (Auckland, New Zealand); NBA Global Academy (Canberra, Australia)
- College: Georgetown (2024–2026); Oklahoma State (2026–present)

Julius Halaifonua (born 9 May 2006) is a New Zealand college basketball player for the Oklahoma State Cowboys of the Big 12 Conference. He previously played for the Georgetown Hoyas.

== Early life and high school ==
Halaifonua grew up in Auckland, New Zealand, the son of Willie Halaifonua and his wife, Turea. His father played rugby, which the younger Halaifonua also played in addition to basketball. However, he quit the sport in 2013 after his father died as a result of injuries sustained during a match.

Halaifonua attended Rosmini College before transferring to the NBA Global Academy in Australia. In 16 games at the academy, he scored 12.8 points per game on 57% shooting from the field.

=== Recruiting ===
Halaifonua was rated a four-star recruit and committed to play college basketball in the United States at Georgetown over offers from Kentucky, North Carolina, and Xavier. At the time of his commitment, Halaifonua was considered by scouts to be the top New Zealand basketball prospect of his generation.

College recruiting
Name	Hometown	School	Height	Weight	Commit date
Julius Halaifonua; C	Auckland, New Zealand	NBA Global Academy (Australia)	7 ft 0 in (2.13 m)	270 lb (120 kg)	Aug 5, 2024
Julius Halaifonua; C	Recruit ratings: Rivals: 247Sports:				
Overall recruit ranking: Rivals: 164 247Sports: 60 ESPN: NR
Note: In many cases, Scout, Rivals, 247Sports, On3, and ESPN may conflict in their listings of height and weight.; In these cases, the average was taken. ESPN grades are on a 100-point scale.; Sources: "Georgetown 2024 Basketball Commitments". Rivals.; "2024 Georgetown Hoyas Recruiting Class". ESPN.; "2024 Team Ranking". Rivals.

== College career ==
=== Georgetown ===
As a freshman, Halaifonua appeared in six games at Georgetown before a foot injury sidelined him for the remainder of the 2024–25 season.

Halaifonua enjoyed greater success during his second collegiate season, and was named to the Big East weekly Honor Roll on 29 December 2025. He scored 21 points and added 10 rebounds for his first collegiate double-double in the Hoyas' upset victory over Villanova in the Big East tournament.

On April 17, 2026, Halaifonua announced that he would be entering the NCAA transfer portal, just eleven days after announcing that he would be returning to Georgetown for a third season.

=== Oklahoma State ===
On April 27, 2026, Halaifonua announced that he would transfer to Oklahoma State University.

== National team career ==
Halaifonua played a starring role for New Zealand at the 2025 FIBA Under-19 Basketball World Cup. He helped lead the Junior Tall Blacks to a fourth-place finish in the tournament, the highest-ever finish for a New Zealand team in that competition. During the tournament Halaifonua averaged 10.6 points per game and 5.4 rebounds per game.

== Personal life ==
Halaifonua is of Tongan and Samoan descent, and he cited the large number of fellow Polynesian athletes at Georgetown as part of his decision to attend the school.

== Career statistics ==
Legend
GP	Games played	GS	Games started	MPG	Minutes per game
FG%	Field goal percentage	3P%	3-point field goal percentage	FT%	Free throw percentage
RPG	Rebounds per game	APG	Assists per game	SPG	Steals per game
BPG	Blocks per game	PPG	Points per game	**Bold**	Career high

=== College ===
Year	Team	GP	GS	MPG	FG%	3P%	FT%	RPG	APG	SPG	BPG	PPG
2024–25	Georgetown	6	0	13.3	.412	.250	**1.000**	2.0	.7	0	.5	3.0
2025–26	Georgetown	**32**	**28**	**19.8**	**.608**	**.273**	.747	**4.4**	**1.3**	**.3**	**.7**	**9.5**
Career		38	28	18.7	.591	.267	.753	4.0	1.2	.2	.7	8.4
