= 2024 FIBA Under-17 Basketball World Cup squads =

This article shows the rosters of all participating teams at the 2024 FIBA Under-17 Basketball World Cup in Turkey.

== Group A ==
=== Lithuania ===
A 12-player squad was announced on 27 June 2024.

Lithuania men's national under-17 basketball team roster
Players
Coaches

Pos.	No.	Name	Age – Date of birth	Height	Club
PF	1	Rokas Norutis	17 – 1 January 2007	1.95 m (6 ft 5 in)	(Lithuania) BC Šiauliai
PG	4	Kajus Mikalauskas	17 – 29 January 2007	1.91 m (6 ft 3 in)	(Lithuania) Kauno Žalgiris-3
PF	5	Mantas Liutkevičius	17 – 11 March 2007	1.82 m (6 ft 0 in)	(Lithuania) Vilniaus krepšinio mokykla
C	7	Grantas Strelčiūnas	16 – 27 August 2007	2.04 m (6 ft 8 in)	(Lithuania) Vilniaus krepšinio mokykla
C	11	Artūras Butajevas	17 – 27 March 2007	2.05 m (6 ft 9 in)	(Spain) FC Barcelona
SF	12	Majus Bulanovas	17 – 15 May 2007	1.93 m (6 ft 4 in)	(Lithuania) Kauno Žalgiris-3
PF	16	Ignas Urbonas	16 – 22 November 2007	1.98 m (6 ft 6 in)	(Lithuania) Sostinės krepšinio mokykla
PF	22	Adomas Pocius	17 – 22 March 2007	1.95 m (6 ft 5 in)	(Lithuania) Sostinės krepšinio mokykla
SF	23	Erikas Sirgedas	16 – 5 August 2007	1.92 m (6 ft 4 in)	(Lithuania) Sostinės krepšinio mokykla
PF	24	Dovydas Buika	17 – 3 January 2007	1.97 m (6 ft 6 in)	(Lithuania) Kauno Žalgiris-2
C	27	Arminas Vilkas	17 – 15 May 2007	2.02 m (6 ft 8 in)	(Lithuania) Tornado krepšinio mokykla
SF	44	Matas Deniušas	17 – 8 April 2007	2.00 m (6 ft 7 in)	(Lithuania) Sostinės krepšinio mokykla

Head coach

Tomas Urbelionis

Assistant coach(es)

Arimantas Mikaločius
Marius Leonavičius

=== Philippines ===
A 12-player squad was announced on 26 June 2024.

Philippines men's national under-17 basketball team roster
Players
Coaches

Pos.	No.	Name	Age – Date of birth	Height	Club
G	0	Noah Banal	16 – 22 November 2007	1.85 m (6 ft 1 in)	(Philippines) Malayan High School of Science
G	1	Joaquin Ludovice	17 – 1 January 2007	1.75 m (5 ft 9 in)	(Philippines) University of Santo Tomas
PG	2	Elijah Williams	17 – 11 May 2007	1.80 m (5 ft 11 in)	(United States) Hudson Catholic Regional High School
F	5	Paul Diao	17 – 21 May 2007	1.98 m (6 ft 6 in)	(United States) West Campus High School
PG	6	Irus Chua	17 – 6 March 2007	1.80 m (5 ft 11 in)	(Philippines) De La Salle Santiago Zobel School
C	8	Bonn Daja	17 – 10 January 2007	1.93 m (6 ft 4 in)	(Philippines) The Rizal Memorial Colleges
PG	11	Kurt Velasquez	17 – 21 February 2007	1.80 m (5 ft 11 in)	(Philippines) University of Santo Tomas
G	12	Dominic Arejola	17 – 20 March 2007	1.82 m (6 ft 0 in)	(Philippines) De La Salle Santiago Zobel School
G	13	Samuel Alegre	15 – 19 July 2008	1.85 m (6 ft 1 in)	(United States) Northwood High School
G	25	Cletz Amos	17 – 25 January 2007	1.85 m (6 ft 1 in)	(Australia) Brisbane State High School
F	26	Edryn Morales	17 – 26 February 2007	1.93 m (6 ft 4 in)	(United States) Manville High School
F	38	Jaime Gomez De Liano	17 – 26 January 2007	1.96 m (6 ft 5 in)	University of the Philippines Diliman

Head coach

Josh Reyes

Assistant coach(es)

Joseph Ricardo
Jorge Sison

=== Puerto Rico ===
A 12-player squad was announced on 20 June 2024.

Puerto Rico men's national under-17 basketball team roster
Players
Coaches

Pos.	No.	Name	Age – Date of birth	Height	Club
C	0	Jahrel Vigo	17 – 26 March 2007	1.86 m (6 ft 1 in)	(United States) Allentown Central Catholic High School
PG	1	Samuel Pino	16 – 5 September 2007	1.83 m (6 ft 0 in)	(Puerto Rico) Colegio Marista Guaynabo
PF	2	Luke Cruz	16 – 16 July 2007	1.83 m (6 ft 0 in)	(United States) Rumson-Fair Haven Regional High School
F	3	Mason Santiago	17 – 10 May 2007	1.94 m (6 ft 4 in)	(United States) St. Peter's Prep Boys Basketball
G	5	Rognny Santiago	16 – 30 October 2007	1.85 m (6 ft 1 in)	(United States) Basketball Without Borders
PG	10	Jordan Dill	17 – 11 May 2007	1.83 m (6 ft 0 in)	(United States) Germantown Friends School
F	11	Justin Roman	17 – 30 April 2007	1.99 m (6 ft 6 in)	(United States) Colonial High School
G	13	Richard Rosa	16 – 9 August 2007	1.82 m (6 ft 0 in)	(United States) West Hardin High School
C	14	Jayden Colón	17 – 27 March 2007	1.83 m (6 ft 0 in)	(Puerto Rico) Washburn School
C	15	Vincent Stewart	17 – 4 June 2007	2.07 m (6 ft 9 in)	(United States) DME Academy
F	20	Alexander Montes	17 – 21 February 2007	1.98 m (6 ft 6 in)	(United States) Deerfield Beach High School
G	21	Felipe Quiñones	17 – 19 January 2007	1.98 m (6 ft 6 in)	(United States) IMG Academy

Head coach

Eddin Santiago

Assistant coach(es)

Álex Falcón
José Laracuente

=== Spain ===
A 12-player squad was announced on 28 June 2024.

Spain men's national under-17 basketball team roster
Players
Coaches

Pos.	No.	Name	Age – Date of birth	Height	Club
PG	4	Raúl Villar	16 – 13 October 2007	1.91 m (6 ft 3 in)	(Spain) FC Barcelona
SG	5	Máximo García-Plata	16 – 12 September 2007	1.90 m (6 ft 3 in)	(Spain) CB Estudiantes
SG	6	Sergi Kemu	17 – 25 February 2007	1.91 m (6 ft 3 in)	(Spain) Valencia Basket
PG	7	Guillermo del Pino	17 – 12 January 2007	1.95 m (6 ft 5 in)	(Spain) Baloncesto Málaga
PG	9	Andy Huelves	17 – 10 March 2007	1.91 m (6 ft 3 in)	(Spain) Zentro Basket
SF	10	Gildas Giménez	17 – 12 January 2007	1.97 m (6 ft 6 in)	(Spain) Real Madrid
PF	11	Alberto Blanco	17 – 20 January 2007	2.03 m (6 ft 8 in)	(Spain) Zentro Basket
PF	12	Ignacio Campoy	16 – 3 December 2007	2.00 m (6 ft 7 in)	(Spain) Real Madrid
C	13	Daniel Balde	17 – 13 January 2007	2.03 m (6 ft 8 in)	(Spain) Joventut Badalona
SF	14	Eric del Castillo	17 – 31 May 2007	1.97 m (6 ft 6 in)	(Spain) Joventut Badalona
C	16	Ian Platteeuw	16 – 3 November 2007	2.11 m (6 ft 11 in)	(Spain) Joventut Badalona
C	19	Nicolás Gómez	16 – 18 July 2007	2.07 m (6 ft 9 in)	(Spain) Valencia Basket

Head coach

Joaquín Prado

Assistant coach(es)

Marco Justo
Alberto Miranda

== Group B ==
=== China ===
A 12-player squad was announced on 28 June 2024.

China men's national under-17 basketball team roster
Players
Coaches

Pos.	No.	Name	Age – Date of birth	Height	Club
G	4	He Wenwei	17 – 5 January 2007	1.80 m (5 ft 11 in)	(China) Guangdong Southern Tigers
PG	5	Liu Yang	17 – 22 February 2007	1.82 m (6 ft 0 in)	(China) Zhejiang Lions
G	6	Li Yuezhou	17 – 9 April 2007	1.85 m (6 ft 1 in)	(China) Zhejiang Golden Bulls
F	7	Shen Wudi	17 – 29 January 2007	1.88 m (6 ft 2 in)	(China) Zhejiang Golden Bulls
G	8	Feng Yubo	17 – 2 February 2007	1.93 m (6 ft 4 in)	(China) Zhejiang Lions
G	9	Fu Jingbo	16 – 27 July 2007	1.88 m (6 ft 2 in)	(China) Shijiazhuang No.2 High School
F	10	Chen Xiaoyi	17 – 19 March 2007	1.93 m (6 ft 4 in)	(China) Shenzhen Leopards
F	11	Zhang Boyuan	17 – 22 January 2007	2.03 m (6 ft 8 in)	(China) Shanxi Loongs
F	12	Fu Wenhao	17 – 1 March 2007	2.03 m (6 ft 8 in)	(China) Shenzhen Leopards
C	13	Wang Hongze	17 – 7 June 2007	2.07 m (6 ft 9 in)	(China) Guangdong Southern Tigers
C	14	Liu Li	16 – 20 August 2007	2.10 m (6 ft 11 in)	(China) Fujian Sturgeons
C	15	Huan Sinan	17 – 8 May 2007	2.15 m (7 ft 1 in)	(China) Joe Tsai Foundation

Head coach

Li Xiaoyong

Assistant coach(es)

Branko Maksimović
Liu Cheng

=== France ===
A 12-player squad was announced on 28 June 2024.

France men's national under-17 basketball team roster
Players
Coaches

Pos.	No.	Name	Age – Date of birth	Height	Club
PG	0	Akram Naji	17 – 2 April 2007	1.93 m (6 ft 4 in)	(France) Élan Chalon
SF	1	Hugo Yimga	15 – 3 July 2008	2.02 m (6 ft 8 in)	Pôle France
PG	2	Maxence Lemoine	17 – 19 June 2007	1.88 m (6 ft 2 in)	(France) SIG Strasbourg
PG	5	Theo Guedegbe	17 – 20 January 2007	1.91 m (6 ft 3 in)	(France) ASVEL Basket
SF	10	Noa Kouakou-Heugue	17 – 28 April 2007	2.04 m (6 ft 8 in)	Pôle France
PF	11	Cameron Houindo	16 – 10 January 2008	2.02 m (6 ft 8 in)	Pôle France
PF	13	Jonas Boulefaa	17 – 16 January 2007	2.05 m (6 ft 9 in)	Pôle France
SF	14	Nathan Soliman	15 – 14 May 2009	2.01 m (6 ft 7 in)	Pôle France
C	21	Jahel Trefle	16 – 21 December 2007	2.05 m (6 ft 9 in)	(France) Élan Béarnais
SG	22	Soren Bracq	17 – 23 February 2007	1.92 m (6 ft 4 in)	(France) Cholet Basket
PG	23	Christopher Ebunangombe	16 – 26 July 2007	1.95 m (6 ft 5 in)	Pôle France
SG	30	Yannis Allard	17 – 5 January 2007	2.00 m (6 ft 7 in)	Pôle France

Head coach

Lamine Kebe

Assistant coach(es)

Maxime Bezin
Nicolas Corbe

=== Guinea ===
A 12-player squad was announced on 28 June 2024.

Guinea men's national under-17 basketball team roster
Players
Coaches

Pos.	No.	Name	Age – Date of birth	Height	Club
SG	2	Sékou Touré	15 – 24 August 2008	1.87 m (6 ft 2 in)	(United States) Busch Academy
C	3	Arafan Diané	16 – 19 November 2007	2.10 m (6 ft 11 in)	(Canada) Institut de Sport Dynastie
SG	4	Karanmadi Gassama	17 – 10 June 2007	1.60 m (5 ft 3 in)	(France) Cergy-Pontoise Basket Ball
PG	5	Gassim Savané	17 – 5 March 2007	1.82 m (6 ft 0 in)	(Canada) J. Addison School
SG	6	Keyssane Massengo	17 – 10 May 2007	1.87 m (6 ft 2 in)	(France) Lille Métropole BC
SG	7	Nour Gassim Touré	15 – 23 October 2008	1.94 m (6 ft 4 in)	(United States) Principia School
C	8	Sekou Cissé	16 – 5 May 2008	2.05 m (6 ft 9 in)	(United States) Principia School
F	12	Mohamed Kourouma	15 – 8 October 2008	2.01 m (6 ft 7 in)	(United States) Accelerated Prep: Colorado's Premier Prep School
C	13	Mohamed Touré	16 – 29 September 2007	2.00 m (6 ft 7 in)	(United States) San Gabriel Academy
C	15	Salim Diaby	16 – 24 December 2007	2.08 m (6 ft 10 in)	(United States) Busch Academy
F	23	Abdouramane Touré	16 – 14 August 2007	1.95 m (6 ft 5 in)	(United States) Notre Dame High School
F	45	Oumar Dabo	15 – 8 December 2008	2.00 m (6 ft 7 in)	(United States) San Gabriel Academy

Head coach

Ibrahima Touré

Assistant coach(es)

Souleymane Camara
Mohamed Hady
Souleymane Kassé

=== United States ===
A 12-player squad was announced on 19 June 2024.

United States men's national under-17 basketball team roster
Players
Coaches

Pos.	No.	Name	Age – Date of birth	Height	Club
F	4	Koa Peat	17 – 20 January 2007	2.03 m (6 ft 8 in)	(United States) Perry High School
G	5	Cayden Boozer	16 – 18 July 2007	1.90 m (6 ft 3 in)	(United States) Christopher Columbus High School
G	6	Caleb Holt	16 – 26 November 2007	1.93 m (6 ft 4 in)	(United States) Buckhorn High School
G	7	AJ Dybantsa	17 – 29 January 2007	2.03 m (6 ft 8 in)	(United States) Utah Prep
G	8	JJ Mandaquit	17 – 26 May 2007	1.85 m (6 ft 1 in)	(United States) Utah Prep
G	9	Jordan Smith	16 – 11 September 2007	1.90 m (6 ft 3 in)	(United States) Paul VI Catholic High School
SG	10	Jalen Haralson	17 – 30 April 2007	2.01 m (6 ft 7 in)	(United States) La Lumiere School
C	11	Chris Cenac	17 – 1 February 2007	2.08 m (6 ft 10 in)	(United States) Isidore Newman School
F	12	Cameron Boozer	16 – 18 July 2007	2.03 m (6 ft 8 in)	(United States) Christopher Columbus High School
G	13	Brandon McCoy Jr.	16 – 13 November 2007	1.93 m (6 ft 4 in)	(United States) St. John Bosco High School
F	14	Tyran Stokes	16 – 12 October 2007	2.01 m (6 ft 7 in)	(United States) Prolific Prep
C	15	Jaden Toombs	17 – 27 May 2007	2.08 m (6 ft 10 in)	(United States) Dynamic Prep

Head coach

Sharman White

Assistant coach(es)

Scott Fitch
Chester Mason

== Group C ==
=== Argentina ===
A 12-player squad was announced on 25 June 2024.

Argentina men's national under-17 basketball team roster
Players
Coaches

Pos.	No.	Name	Age – Date of birth	Height	Club
PF	1	Tyler Kropp	17 – 6 March 2007	2.04 m (6 ft 8 in)	(United States) Olentangy Liberty High School
F	4	Tomás Scola	17 – 17 April 2007	2.00 m (6 ft 7 in)	(Italy) Pallacanestro Varese
PF	5	Santiago Cabodevilla	17 – 19 June 2007	2.01 m (6 ft 7 in)	(Italy) Basket Corato
PF	6	Joaquín Sarmiento	17 – 18 January 2007	2.01 m (6 ft 7 in)	(Italy) Assigeco Basket Academy
F	7	Martín Chapero	16 – 24 November 2007	2.00 m (6 ft 7 in)	(Argentina) Club Atlético Peñarol
PG	8	Matías Dominé	17 – 18 February 2007	1.87 m (6 ft 2 in)	(Argentina) Quilmes de Mar del Plata
SG	9	Martín Torriani	17 – 22 March 2007	1.89 m (6 ft 2 in)	(Argentina) Boca Juniors
PG	10	Juan Arias	17 – 25 April 2007	1.77 m (5 ft 10 in)	(Argentina) Argentino de Junín
SG	11	Felipe Minzer	16 – 13 September 2007	1.97 m (6 ft 6 in)	(Spain) Basket Zaragoza
PF	14	Fidel Cifuentes Rotta	16 – 1 November 2007	2.01 m (6 ft 7 in)	(Argentina) Boca Juniors
PF	15	Iván Prato	17 – 21 January 2007	2.08 m (6 ft 10 in)	(Italy) Pallacanestro Varese
PG	21	Simón Gradin	16 – 31 March 2008	1.98 m (6 ft 6 in)	(Argentina) Obras Sanitarias

Head coach

Leonardo Gutiérrez

Assistant coach(es)

Juan Fernández
Mariano Marcos

=== Italy ===
A 12-player squad was announced on 27 June 2024.

Italy men's national under-17 basketball team roster
Players
Coaches

Pos.	No.	Name	Age – Date of birth	Height	Club
G	0	Patrick Hassan	17 – 20 January 2007	1.85 m (6 ft 1 in)	(Italy) Orange1 Basket Bassano
F	1	Maikcol Perez	16 – 1 December 2007	2.02 m (6 ft 8 in)	(Italy) Orange1 Basket Bassano
G	2	Adrian Mathis	17 – 5 January 2007	1.85 m (6 ft 1 in)	(United States) Lake Travis High School
C	7	Jason Nistrio	17 – 7 June 2007	2.11 m (6 ft 11 in)	(Italy) Orange1 Basket Bassano
G	8	Giovanni Granai	17 – 14 January 2007	1.94 m (6 ft 4 in)	(Italy) Stella Azzurra Roma
G	11	Francesco Carnevale	17 – 11 May 2007	1.94 m (6 ft 4 in)	(Italy) Orange1 Basket Bassano
C	19	Luigi Suigo	17 – 29 January 2007	2.16 m (7 ft 1 in)	(Italy) Olimpia Milano
G	22	Achille Lonati	17 – 22 January 2007	1.95 m (6 ft 5 in)	(Italy) Olimpia Milano
F	23	Diego Garavaglia	17 – 4 April 2007	2.00 m (6 ft 7 in)	(Italy) Olimpia Milano
G	24	Matteo Accorsi	17 – 13 May 2007	1.90 m (6 ft 3 in)	(Italy) Virtus Segafredo Bologna
G	25	Mattia Ceccato	17 – 8 June 2007	1.95 m (6 ft 5 in)	(Italy) Olimpia Milano
C	32	Brian Angeletti	17 – 1 June 2007	2.02 m (6 ft 8 in)	(Italy) Orange1 Basket Bassano

Head coach

Giuseppe Mangone

Assistant coach(es)

Vanni Talpo
Alfredo Lamberti

=== New Zealand ===
A 12-player squad was announced on 24 April 2024.

New Zealand men's national under-17 basketball team roster
Players
Coaches

Pos.	No.	Name	Age – Date of birth	Height	Club
G	0	James Matthews	16 – 18 August 2007	1.87 m (6 ft 2 in)	(New Zealand) Nelson Giants
PG	2	Gus Dallow	17 – 2 May 2007	1.82 m (6 ft 0 in)	(New Zealand) Auckland Tuatara
SG	4	Mana Martin	16 – 31 July 2007	1.97 m (6 ft 6 in)	(New Zealand) Canterbury Rams
SF	5	Troy Plumtree	17 – 11 January 2007	1.96 m (6 ft 5 in)	(New Zealand) Wellington Saints
F	8	Jackson Kiss	17 – 26 May 2007	2.01 m (6 ft 7 in)	(New Zealand) Auckland Tuatara
G	9	Jackson Ball	16 – 10 March 2008	1.92 m (6 ft 4 in)	(New Zealand) Hawke's Bay Hawks
F	11	Ihaka Cate	16 – 29 August 2007	1.98 m (6 ft 6 in)	(New Zealand) Canterbury Rams
F	12	Oscar Goodman	17 – 5 February 2007	2.03 m (6 ft 8 in)	(Australia) Centre of Excellence
G	13	Hayden Jones	17 – 9 January 2007	2.00 m (6 ft 7 in)	(New Zealand) Nelson Giants
SG	14	Lachlan Crate	17 – 23 January 2007	2.00 m (6 ft 7 in)	(New Zealand) Manawatu Jets
SF	15	Jameer Reed	16 – 15 August 2007	1.95 m (6 ft 5 in)	(New Zealand) Auckland Tuatara
G	17	Hunter Te Ratana	17 – 17 April 2007	1.93 m (6 ft 4 in)	(New Zealand) Auckland Tuatara

Head coach

Leyton Haddleton

Assistant coach(es)

Darron Larsen
Greg Brockbank
Jason Crummer

=== Turkey ===
A 12-player squad was announced on 28 June 2024.

Turkey men's national under-17 basketball team roster
Players
Coaches

Pos.	No.	Name	Age – Date of birth	Height	Club
PF	0	Anıl Alyanak	16 – 7 January 2008	2.03 m (6 ft 8 in)	(Turkey) TAC Spor Kulübü
C	2	Rezon Elezay	17 – 22 May 2007	2.18 m (7 ft 2 in)	(Turkey) Beşiktaş JK
SG	5	Mete Paçacı	17 – 4 May 2007	1.91 m (6 ft 3 in)	(Turkey) Bursaspor
SG	10	Cengiz Coşkun	17 – 23 April 2007	1.94 m (6 ft 4 in)	(Turkey) Bahçeşehir Koleji SK
SG	11	Atahan Akbaş	17 – 22 April 2007	1.97 m (6 ft 6 in)	(Turkey) İstanbul Anka Spor
PG	12	Mert Kocagözoğlu	16 – 10 September 2007	1.98 m (6 ft 6 in)	(Turkey) İstanbul Anka Spor
SG	13	Derin Can Üstün	17 – 7 March 2007	1.92 m (6 ft 4 in)	(Slovenia) KK Cedevita Olimpija
PF	15	Aldın Türkoğlu	16 – 5 November 2007	2.08 m (6 ft 10 in)	(Turkey) İstanbul Anka Spor
PF	16	Emirhan Serbest	17 – 17 March 2007	2.05 m (6 ft 9 in)	(Turkey) Gemlik
C	21	Ahmet Arda Aydın	16 – 31 July 2007	2.05 m (6 ft 9 in)	(Turkey) Bahçeşehir Koleji SK
SF	24	Yavuz Selim Kara	17 – 25 March 2007	2.03 m (6 ft 8 in)	(Turkey) Bahçeşehir Koleji SK
PG	29	Kaan Onat	17 – 8 April 2007	1.95 m (6 ft 5 in)	(Turkey) İstanbul Anka Spor

Head coach

Hasan Özmeriç

Assistant coach(es)

Özcan Çakar
Cihan Gündüz

== Group D ==
=== Australia ===
A 12-player squad was announced on 28 June 2024.

Australia men's national under-17 basketball team roster
Players
Coaches

Pos.	No.	Name	Age – Date of birth	Height	Club
G	1	Nash Walker	16 – 26 September 2007	1.95 m (6 ft 5 in)	(Australia) NBA Global Academy
G	2	Joel Robinson	16 – 1 October 2007	1.94 m (6 ft 4 in)	(Australia) Victoria State
SG	3	Indy Cotton	17 – 8 May 2007	1.95 m (6 ft 5 in)	(Australia) Queensland
PG	4	Dash Daniels	16 – 18 December 2007	1.95 m (6 ft 5 in)	(Australia) NBA Global Academy
PG	5	Alexander Dickeson	16 – 13 November 2007	1.91 m (6 ft 3 in)	(Australia) Centre of Excellence
PF	7	Mading Kuany	16 – 10 July 2007	2.00 m (6 ft 7 in)	(Australia) NBA Global Academy
G	9	Harrison Beauchamp	17 – 5 January 2007	1.97 m (6 ft 6 in)	(Australia) Victoria State
C	10	Sa Pilimai	17 – 5 May 2007	2.17 m (7 ft 1 in)	(Australia) NBA Global Academy
F	11	Ajak Nyuon	17 – 13 May 2007	2.09 m (6 ft 10 in)	(Australia) Centre of Excellence
C	12	Henry Sewell	16 – 15 November 2007	2.06 m (6 ft 9 in)	(Australia) Victoria State
PG	31	Ryder Cheesman	17 – 20 January 2007	1.93 m (6 ft 4 in)	(Australia) Victoria State
F	32	Roor Akhuar	17 – 30 April 2007	2.00 m (6 ft 7 in)	(Australia) Centre of Excellence

Head coach

Nathan Cooper-Brown

Assistant coach(es)

Ashley Arnott
Luke Cann

=== Canada ===
A 12-player squad was announced on 28 June 2024.

Canada men's national under-17 basketball team roster
Players
Coaches

Pos.	No.	Name	Age – Date of birth	Height	Club
SG	0	Kole Grandison	17 – 21 January 2007	1.93 m (6 ft 4 in)	(United States) Immaculate Conception High School
PG	3	Tutjiek Wal	17 – 27 January 2007	1.94 m (6 ft 4 in)	(United States) Archbishop O'Leary Catholic High School
PG	4	Jordan Charles	16 – 23 July 2007	1.80 m (5 ft 11 in)	(United States) Dream City Christian School
PG	5	Amari Upshaw	16 – 12 February 2008	1.93 m (6 ft 4 in)	(Canada) Orangeville Prep
SG	7	Quinten Ethier	17 – 1 January 2007	1.90 m (6 ft 3 in)	(Canada) Ridley College
PG	8	Miles Sadler	16 – 4 July 2007	1.78 m (5 ft 10 in)	(United States) Dream City Christian School
PF	12	Stefan Ilic	15 – 22 October 2008	2.06 m (6 ft 9 in)	(Canada) Tri City Prep
SF	13	Patrick Anamali	17 – 23 January 2007	1.98 m (6 ft 6 in)	(Canada) Edge Prep
C	15	Maxime Meyer	16 – 14 January 2008	2.10 m (6 ft 11 in)	(United States) IMG Academy
C	21	Tristan-James St. Louis	16 – 20 December 2007	2.10 m (6 ft 11 in)	(Canada) Orangeville Prep
SF	22	Mahliq Guiseppi-Kitson	17 – 3 April 2007	1.93 m (6 ft 4 in)	(Canada) United Scholastic Academy
PF	23	Paul Osaruyi	16 – 26 February 2008	2.03 m (6 ft 8 in)	(United States) Dream City Christian School

Head coach

Chris Cheng

Assistant coach(es)

Dan Vanhooren
Peter Guarasci

=== Egypt ===
A 12-player squad was announced on 26 June 2024.

Egypt men's national under-17 basketball team roster
Players
Coaches

Pos.	No.	Name	Age – Date of birth	Height	Club
PF	1	Rami Magdy	15 – 29 July 2008	1.98 m (6 ft 6 in)	(Egypt) Al Ittihad Alexandria
SF	2	Annas Tolba	16 – 24 September 2007	1.95 m (6 ft 5 in)	(Egypt) Al Ahly
PF	5	Omar Mowafak	16 – 15 September 2007	2.04 m (6 ft 8 in)	(Egypt) Al Ahly
PF	7	Ali Assran	17 – 4 March 2007	2.05 m (6 ft 9 in)	(Egypt) Al Ahly
PG	8	Youssef El-Gabry	17 – 5 February 2007	1.83 m (6 ft 0 in)	(Egypt) Alexandria Sporting
PG	10	Mohamed Shahin	17 – 14 April 2007	1.90 m (6 ft 3 in)	(Egypt) Smouha
SF	12	Nour El-Sawy	16 – 7 November 2007	1.97 m (6 ft 6 in)	(Egypt) Smouha
SG	14	Mohab Refaat	17 – 19 June 2007	1.90 m (6 ft 3 in)	(Egypt) Al Ittihad Alexandria
PF	15	Belal Sohaib	16 – 8 April 2008	2.07 m (6 ft 9 in)	(Egypt) Al Ahly
PG	30	Youssef El-Halawany	16 – 24 July 2007	1.88 m (6 ft 2 in)	(Egypt) Smouha
SG	34	Ahmed Fady	17 – 11 June 2007	1.97 m (6 ft 6 in)	(Egypt) Al Ahly
C	35	Omar Essam	16 – 1 October 2007	2.10 m (6 ft 11 in)	(Egypt) Al Ahly

Head coach

Amr Abouelkhir

Assistant coach(es)

Mohamed Abofrekha
Haytham Kamel

=== Germany ===
A 12-player squad was announced on 26 June 2024.

Germany men's national under-17 basketball team roster
Players
Coaches

Pos.	No.	Name	Age – Date of birth	Height	Club
F	2	Milo Murray	16 – 12 October 2007	1.97 m (6 ft 6 in)	(Germany) BBU '01
SG	4	Kenan Reinhart	17 – 4 May 2007	1.92 m (6 ft 4 in)	(Germany) RheinStars Köln
SG	7	Julis Baumer	17 – 4 January 2007	1.96 m (6 ft 5 in)	(Germany) Porsche BBA
SF	10	Declan Duru	17 – 12 January 2007	2.00 m (6 ft 7 in)	(Spain) Real Madrid
SG	11	Fabian Kayser	15 – 25 March 2009	2.02 m (6 ft 8 in)	(Germany) Paderborn Baskets
PG	12	Lukas Stojic	17 – 14 January 2007	1.91 m (6 ft 3 in)	(Croatia) KK Medveščak
PF	13	Ivan Crnjac	17 – 10 March 2007	2.03 m (6 ft 8 in)	(Germany) Skyliners Frankfurt
C	14	Fynn Lastring	17 – 11 May 2007	2.08 m (6 ft 10 in)	(Germany) VfL AstroStars Bochum
SG	15	Jervis Scheffs	16 – 9 October 2007	1.92 m (6 ft 4 in)	(Germany) BBU '01
C	17	Clemens Sokolov	17 – 25 May 2007	2.10 m (6 ft 11 in)	(Germany) Post SV Nürnberg
PF	22	Nevio Bennefeld	17 – 30 January 2007	2.11 m (6 ft 11 in)	(Germany) Alba Berlin
PG	24	Tom Brüggemann	17 – 28 February 2007	1.87 m (6 ft 2 in)	(Germany) Paderborn Baskets

Head coach

Dirk Bauermann

Assistant coach(es)

Heimo Förster
Stephen Arigbabu
