= Rafa Villar (basketball) =

Spanish basketball player (born 2004)

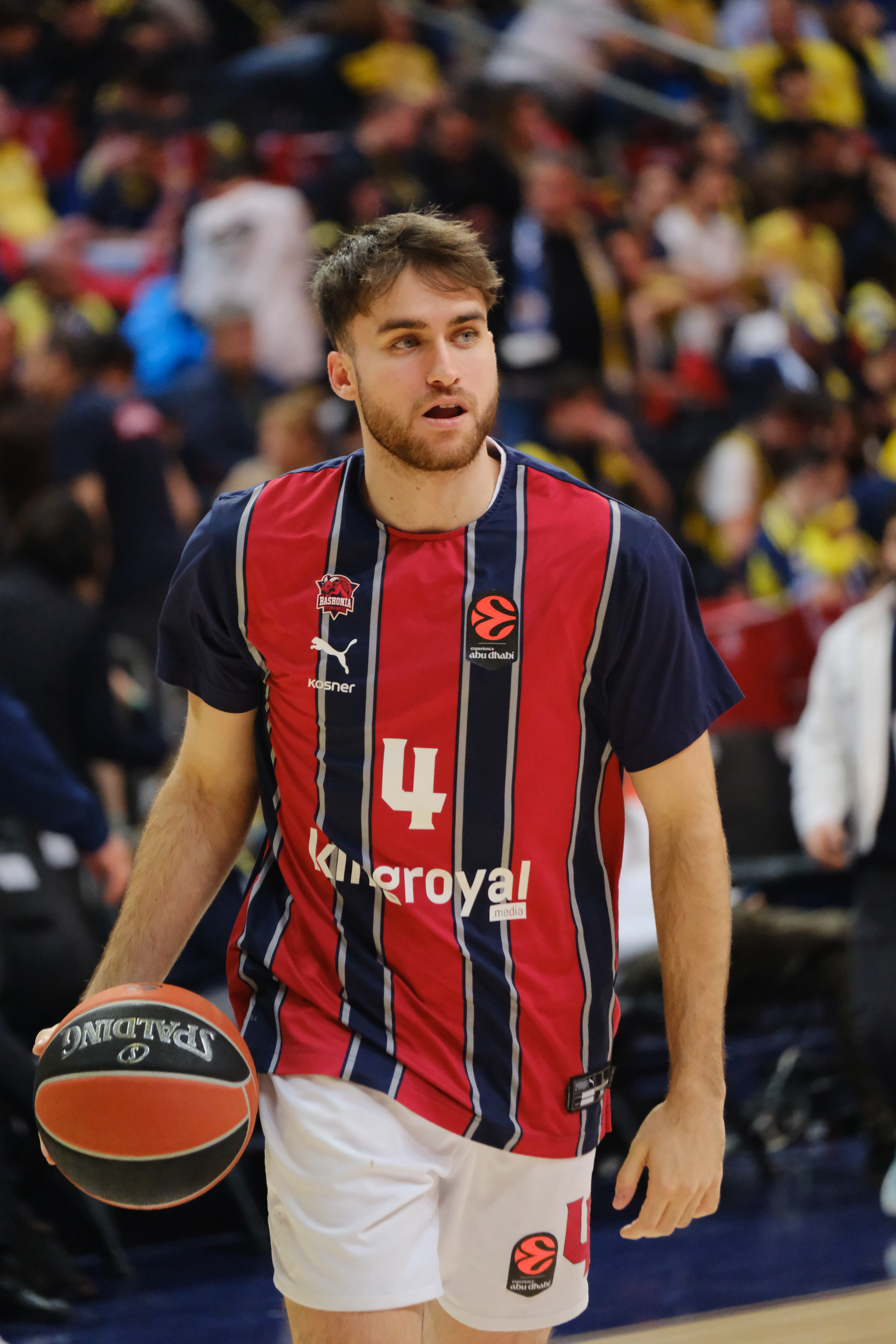
- Villar with Baskonia in 2026

No. 44 – Bàsquet Manresa
- Position: Point guard
- League: Liga ACB; EuroCup

Personal information
- Born: 9 August 2004 (age 22) Barcelona, Spain
- Listed height: 1.91 m (6 ft 3 in)

Career information
- Playing career: 2021–present

Career history
- 2021–2024: FC Barcelona
- 2021–2022: →FC Barcelona B
- 2022–2024: →Força Lleida
- 2024–2025: Força Lleida
- 2025–2026: Baskonia
- 2026–present: Manresa

Career highlights
- Spanish Cup winner (2026); All-Liga ACB Young Players Team (2026)
Medals
Men's basketball
Representing Spain
U18 European Championship
Gold medal – first place	2022 Turkey	U18 Team
U19 World Cup
Gold medal – first place	2023 Hungary	U19 Team

Rafael "Rafa" Villar Cornago (born 9 August 2004), is a Spanish professional basketball player for Manresa of the Liga ACB and the EuroCup. He has also represented the Spanish national team. Standing at 6 ft 4 in (1.93 m), Villar plays in the point guard position.

His younger brother Raúl Villar is a basketball player for the Charlotte 49ers.

== Early life and youth career ==
Growing up in l'Hospitalet de Llobregat, Rafa Villar started playing basketball in the youth ranks of a local team, CB L'Hospitalet. Villar joined the FC Barcelona youth ranks at the infantil category. He made his way through the team's youth categories until reaching FC Barcelona B, playing in the Liga EBA.

== Professional career ==
Villar would make his professional debut in 2021, while still a FC Barcelona B player. He played his first minutes for the FC Barcelona first team in a EuroLeague game against Zalgiris in the 2021-22 season. He would go on to make his Liga ACB debut in the 2022-23 season, in a game against Manresa. He would play two more Liga ACB games that season.

In December 2022, Villar was loaned out to Força Lleida, which at the time was playing in LEB Oro. After playing 27 games and reaching the playoffs, Villar's loan with the Catalans would be extended for an additional season. In the 2023-24 season, Villar would win the LEB Oro playoffs and achieve promotion to Liga ACB with Força Lleida.

In June 2024, Villar's tenure at FC Barcelona ended as the club decided against extending his contract. Shortly after, in July 2024, Villar became a Força Lleida player once again as he joined the Liga ACB team as a free agent. He signed a 2 year contract with the Catalans. On June 30, 2025, Lleida announced Villar had activated the exit clause of his contract, thus leaving the team before the start of the 2025-26 season.

On July 1, 2025, Baskonia officially announced Villar as a new player, joining on a three season contract.

On July 23, 2026, Villar signed with Manresa of the Liga ACB and the EuroCup.

== National team career ==
Villar has played in several international tournaments with the youth ranks of the Spanish national team, winning the U18 European Championship in 2022 and the U19 World Cup in 2023.

He made his debut the senior Spanish national team in a qualifier game for EuroBasket 2025 against Slovakia.

== Awards and accomplishments ==
=== Spanish junior national team ===
- 2022 U18 European Championship: Gold
- 2023 U19 World Cup: Gold
