= Ma Chengqing =

Chinese basketball player

Personal information
- Nationality: Chinese
- Born: 15 November 1975 (age 50) Nanning, China

Sport
- Sport: Basketball

Ma Chengqing (simplified Chinese: 马澄清; traditional Chinese: 馬澄清; pinyin: Mǎ Chéngqīng; born 15 November 1975) is a Chinese basketball player. She competed in the women's tournament at the 1996 Summer Olympics.

She has two twin sons, Huan Sinan and Huan Sifeng, both of them are basketball players.
