= Steven Huan =

Chinese basketball player (born 2007)

Steven Huan 郇斯枫
No. 10 – UMBC Retrievers
- Position: Center / Power forward
- Conference: America East Conference

Personal information
- Born: May 8, 2007 (age 19) Nanjing, Jiangsu, China
- Listed height: 7 ft 0 in (2.13 m)
- Listed weight: 235 lb (107 kg)

Career information
- High school: Tsinghua University (Beijing, China); Bishop O'Connell (Arlington, Virginia); St. Andrew's Episcopal (Potomac, Maryland)
- College: UMBC (2026–present)

Career highlights
- CJBL National Tournament All-Tournament Team (2022)
Medals
Men's basketball
Representing China
FIBA U18 Asia Cup
Bronze medal – third place	2024 Amman

Huan Sifeng (Chinese: 郇斯枫; born May 8, 2007) , also known as Steven Huan, is a Chinese college basketball player who plays as a center/power forward. He currently plays for UMBC Retrievers men's basketball.

He is the elder twin brother of Huan Sinan, who is also a basketball player.

== Early life ==
Huan comes from a basketball family. His mother, Ma Chengqing, is a former basketball player who stood 194 cm (6 ft 4 in) tall and represented the China women's national basketball team at the 1996 Summer Olympics. Sifeng and his brother began playing basketball at the age of six and attended Tsinghua University High School for junior high school.

On August 19, 2022, Huan represented Tsinghua University High School at the 2021–22 Chinese Junior-high-school Basketball League (CJBL) National Tournament. Tsinghua defeated Mingde Huaxing Middle School 89–81 in the semifinals and eventually finished third in the tournament. Huan was named to the tournament's All-Star Team.

In 2022, Huan moved to the United States for high school basketball. Unlike his brother, who received a Joe Tsai Basketball Scholarship, Huan attended Bishop O'Connell High School and later St. Andrew's Episcopal School.

During his senior season, Huan received scholarship offers from the University of Maryland, College Park, University of Maryland, Baltimore County, University of Central Florida, Wichita State University and Long Island University.

== Recruiting ==
College recruiting
Name	Hometown	School	Height	Weight	Commit date
Sifeng Huan; C	Potomac, Maryland	St. Andrew's Episcopal School	6 ft 10 in (2.08 m)	210 lb (95 kg)	Apr 23, 2026
Sifeng Huan; C	Recruit ratings: 247Sports:				
Overall recruit ranking: 247Sports: 41 (C)
Note: In many cases, Scout, Rivals, 247Sports, On3, and ESPN may conflict in their listings of height and weight.; In these cases, the average was taken. ESPN grades are on a 100-point scale.; Sources: "2026 Team Ranking". Rivals.

== College career ==
On April 23, 2026, Huan committed to play college basketball for the UMBC Retrievers.

== National team career ==
Huan represented China at the 2024 FIBA U18 Asia Cup, helping the team win the bronze medal. He also participated the 2025 FIBA Under-19 Basketball World Cup, in both of which he was selected with his brother Sinan.
