= 2024 FIBA Under-17 Basketball World Cup =

International men's youth basketball championship

2024 FIBA 17 Yaş Altı Basketbol Dünya Kupası

Tournament details
- Host country: Turkey
- Dates: 29 June–7 July
- Teams: 16 (from 4 confederations)
- Venues: 2 (in 1 host city)

Final positions
- Champions: United States (7th title)
- Runners-up: Italy
- Third place: Turkey
- Fourth place: New Zealand

Tournament statistics
- Games played: 56
- MVP: (United States) Cameron Boozer
- Top scorer: (Guinea) Abdouramane Touré (23.0 ppg)

Official website
- Website

The 2024 FIBA Under-17 Basketball World Cup was the eighth edition of the FIBA Under-17 Basketball World Cup, the biennial international men's youth basketball championship contested by the U17 national teams of the member associations of FIBA.

It was held in Turkey from 29 June to 7 July 2024. To be eligible for this competition, players must be born on or after 1 January 2007.

The United States won the final against Italy to win their seventh title.

== Qualified teams ==
Means of qualification	Date(s)	Venue(s)	Berth(s)	Qualifiers
Host nation	—N/a	—N/a	1	Turkey
2023 FIBA Under-16 Americas Championship	5–11 June 2023	(Mexico) Mérida	4	United States; Canada; Puerto Rico; Argentina
2023 FIBA Under-16 African Championship	13–23 July 2023	(Tunisia) Monastir	2	Guinea; Egypt
2023 FIBA U16 European Championship	5–13 August 2023	(North Macedonia) Skopje	5	Spain; Italy; France; Lithuania; Germany
2023 FIBA U16 Asian Championship	17–22 September 2023	(Qatar) Doha	4	Australia; New Zealand; China; Philippines
Total			16	

== Venues ==
Istanbul		2024 FIBA Under-17 Basketball World Cup (Turkey)
Sinan Erdem Dome	Ahmet Cömert Sport Hall	2024 FIBA Under-17 Basketball World Cup (Turkey)
Capacity: 16,000	Capacity: 3,500	2024 FIBA Under-17 Basketball World Cup (Turkey)

== Draw ==
The draw took place on 27 March 2024.

=== Seeding ===
Pot 1 Team Turkey United States Spain Australia	Pot 2 Team France Italy Lithuania Canada	Pot 3 Team Germany Puerto Rico Argentina Guinea	Pot 4 Team New Zealand China Egypt Philippines

== Preliminary round ==
All times are local (UTC+3).

=== Group A ===
Pos	Team	Pld	W	L	PF	PA	PD	Pts
1	Spain	3	3	0	265	172	+93	6
2	Lithuania	3	2	1	277	208	+69	5
3	Puerto Rico	3	1	2	241	237	+4	4
4	Philippines	3	0	3	135	301	−166	3

Source: FIBA
Rules for classification: 1) Points; 2) Head-to-head results; 3) Points difference; 4) Points scored.

29 June 2024
12:00

Boxscore

Spain	89–63	Puerto Rico
Scoring by quarter: 17–12, 21–12, 24–23, 27–16
Pts: Giménez 17; Rebs: Giménez 9 Asts: three players 4		Pts: Vigo 9 Rebs: Vigo 8 Asts: Quiñones 4

Ahmet Cömert Sport Hall, Istanbul
Attendance: 85
Referees: Beniamino Attard (ITA), Daigo Urushima (JPN), Fernando Leite (BRA)

29 June 2024
12:30

Boxscore

Lithuania	107–48	Philippines
Scoring by quarter: 23–13, 23–16, 35–7, 26–12
Pts: Butajevas 22; Rebs: Butajevas 9 Asts: Buika 6		Pts: Amos 10; Rebs: Velasquez 6 Asts: three players 2

Sinan Erdem Dome, Istanbul
Attendance: 400
Referees: Alan dos Santos (BRA), Maj Forsberg (DEN), Mehmet Karabilecen (TUR)

30 June 2024
17:00

Boxscore

Puerto Rico	80–95	Lithuania
Scoring by quarter: 16–20, 22–23, 19–28, 23–24
Pts: Dill 21; Rebs: Roman, M. Santiago 5 Asts: Quiñones 3		Pts: Butajevas 19; Rebs: Butajevas 12; Asts: Buika, Mikalauskas 4

Ahmet Cömert Sport Hall, Istanbul
Attendance: 150
Referees: Abayomi Koledoye (NGR), Krishna Domínguez (CHI), Park Kyoung-jin (KOR)

30 June 2024
17:30

Boxscore

Philippines	34–96	Spain
Scoring by quarter: 2–30, 11–27, 11–19, 10–20
Pts: Daja 12; Rebs: Daja 5 Asts: Morales 3		Pts: García-Plata 15; Rebs: Campoy 11; Asts: García-Plata 9

Sinan Erdem Dome, Istanbul
Attendance: 650
Referees: Maripier Malo (CAN), Yann Davidson (MAD), Jean Ruhamiriza (RWA)

2 July 2024
15:00

Boxscore

Spain	80–75	Lithuania
Scoring by quarter: 18–20, 17–22, 21–23, 24–10
Pts: Giménez 15; Rebs: Platteeuw 8 Asts: Villar 5		Pts: Buika 15; Rebs: Butajevas 10; Asts: Liutkevičius 5

Ahmet Cömert Sport Hall, Istanbul
Attendance: 300
Referees: Viola Györgyi (NOR), Waseem Husainy (CAN), Nicolas Fernandes (AUS)

2 July 2024
15:00

Boxscore

Philippines	53–98	Puerto Rico
Scoring by quarter: 24–16, 6–32, 4–30, 19–20
Pts: Ludovice 13; Rebs: Daja, Morales 9 Asts: Velasquez 6		Pts: Dill 15; Rebs: Stewart Jr. 10; Asts: Quiñones 6

Sinan Erdem Dome, Istanbul
Attendance: 220
Referees: Mehmet Karabilecen (TUR), Wissam Zein (SYR), Fernando Leite (BRA)

=== Group B ===
Pos	Team	Pld	W	L	PF	PA	PD	Pts
1	United States	3	3	0	374	192	+182	6
2	France	3	1	2	251	247	+4	4
3	China	3	1	2	227	317	−90	4
4	Guinea	3	1	2	220	316	−96	4

Source: FIBA
Rules for classification: 1) Points; 2) Head-to-head results; 3) Points difference; 4) Points scored.

29 June 2024
17:00

Boxscore

China	92–101	Guinea
Scoring by quarter: 22–30, 21–22, 21–26, 28–23
Pts: Huan 25; Rebs: Huan 8 Asts: Li, Zhang 3		Pts: Diané 28; Rebs: Diané 13; Asts: N. Touré 7

Ahmet Cömert Sport Hall, Istanbul
Attendance: 75
Referees: Gvidas Gedvilas (LTU), Mohammad Taha (JOR), Cecília Montgomery-Tóth (HUN)

29 June 2024
17:30

Boxscore

United States	104–81	France
Scoring by quarter: 31–17, 24–25, 27–17, 22–22
Pts: Cam. Boozer 29; Rebs: Boozer 12; Asts: Cay. Boozer 9		Pts: Allard 19; Rebs: Soliman 5 Asts: Bracq 5

Sinan Erdem Dome, Istanbul
Attendance: 600
Referees: Martin Horozov (BUL), Ariadna Chueca (ESP), Carlos Vélez (COL)

30 June 2024
14:30

Boxscore

France	70–73	China
Scoring by quarter: 19–19, 23–13, 16–24, 12–17
Pts: Yimga 29; Rebs: Yimga 9 Asts: Lemoine, Naji 4		Pts: Zhang 18; Rebs: Huan 10; Asts: He 5

Ahmet Cömert Sport Hall, Istanbul
Attendance: 200
Referees: Wissam Zein (SYR), Sara El-Sharnouby (EGY), Fernando Leite (BRA)

30 June 2024
15:00

Boxscore

Guinea	49–124	United States
Scoring by quarter: 14–28, 9–31, 18–37, 8–28
Pts: Cissé, Diané 14; Rebs: Diané 11; Asts: three players 3		Pts: Dybantsa 19; Rebs: Cam. Boozer 10; Asts: Mandaquit, Stokes 6

Sinan Erdem Dome, Istanbul
Attendance: 325
Referees: Gvidas Gedvilas (LTU), Viola Györgyi (NOR), Mbaye Seye (SEN)

2 July 2024
12:30

Boxscore

France	100–70	Guinea
Scoring by quarter: 27-18, 24-14, 21-21, 28-17
Pts: Yimga 16; Rebs: Yimga 7 Asts: Bracq 6		Pts: A. Touré 19; Rebs: Diané 11; Asts: N. Touré 5

Ahmet Cömert Sport Hall, Istanbul
Attendance: 160
Referees: Krishna Domínguez (MEX), Sara El-Sharnouby (EGY), Daigo Urushima (JPN)

2 July 2024
12:30

Boxscore

China	62–146	United States
Scoring by quarter: 10-38, 20-35, 23-35, 9-38
Pts: Li 17; Rebs: three players 5 Asts: Li 4		Pts: Haralson 21; Rebs: Cam. Boozer 9 Asts: Stokes 10

Sinan Erdem Dome, Istanbul
Attendance: 215
Referees: Ariadna Chueca (ESP), Park Kyoung-jin (KOR), Jean Ruhamiriza (RWA)

=== Group C ===
Pos	Team	Pld	W	L	PF	PA	PD	Pts
1	New Zealand	3	2	1	272	270	+2	5 (Note: Turkey 94–114 New Zealand)
2	Turkey (H)	3	2	1	247	239	+8	5
3	Argentina	3	1	2	215	242	−27	4 (Note: Argentina 83–79 Italy)
4	Italy	3	1	2	248	231	+17	4

Source: FIBA
Rules for classification: 1) Points; 2) Head-to-head results; 3) Points difference; 4) Points scored.
(H) Hosts
Notes:

29 June 2024
19:30

Boxscore

Argentina	83–79	Italy
Scoring by quarter: 19–27, 25–28, 19–14, 20–10
Pts: Kropp 29; Rebs: Minzer 9 Asts: Arias 5		Pts: Perez 20; Rebs: Perez 6 Asts: Carnevale, Hassan 3

Ahmet Cömert Sport Hall, Istanbul
Attendance: 100
Referees: Viola Györgyi (NOR), Nicolas Fernandes (AUS), Carmelo de la Rosa (PUR)

29 June 2024
20:00

Boxscore

Turkey	94–114	New Zealand
Scoring by quarter: 21–38, 16–28, 19–30, 38–18
Pts: Onat 17; Rebs: Onat 5 Asts: Akbaş 6		Pts: Goodman 26; Rebs: Plumtree 14; Asts: Goodman 7

Sinan Erdem Dome, Istanbul
Attendance: 750
Referees: Maripier Malo (CAN), Waseem Husainy (CAN), Teresa Stuck (USA)

30 June 2024
19:30

Boxscore

New Zealand	89–81	Argentina
Scoring by quarter: 24–26, 12–17, 20–18, 33–20
Pts: Plumtree 22; Rebs: Plumtree 11; Asts: five players 2		Pts: Kropp 25; Rebs: Minzer 9 Asts: Arias 5

Ahmet Cömert Sport Hall, Istanbul
Attendance: 120
Referees: Nicolas Fernandes (AUS), Carlos Vélez (COL), Daigo Urushima (JPN)

30 June 2024
20:00

Boxscore

Italy	74–79	Turkey
Scoring by quarter: 28–18, 14–25, 18–18, 14–18
Pts: Garavaglia 18; Rebs: Suigo 11; Asts: Hassan 7		Pts: Onat 24; Rebs: Kara 8 Asts: Ustun 7

Sinan Erdem Dome, Istanbul
Attendance: 1,600
Referees: Martin Horozov (BUL), Maj Forsberg (DEN), Alan dos Santos (BRA)

2 July 2024
20:00

Boxscore

New Zealand	69–95	Italy
Scoring by quarter: 14–14, 20–28, 21–27, 14–26
Pts: Goodman 13; Rebs: four players 7 Asts: Goodman 4		Pts: Lonati 16; Rebs: Accorsi, Garavaglia 5 Asts: Ceccato 7

Ahmet Cömert Sport Hall, Istanbul
Attendance: 100
Referees: Martin Horozov (BUL), Teresa Stuck (USA), Amal Dahra (FRA)

2 July 2024
20:00

Boxscore

Argentina	51–74	Turkey
Scoring by quarter: 11–20, 15–17, 13–12, 12–25
Pts: Minzer 18; Rebs: Kropp 9 Asts: Minzer 4		Pts: Onat 32; Rebs: Türkoğlu 9 Asts: Türkoğlu, Ustun 5

Sinan Erdem Dome, Istanbul
Attendance: 500
Referees: Gvidas Gedvilas (LTU), Maripier Malo (CAN), Carmelo de la Rosa (PUR)

=== Group D ===
Pos	Team	Pld	W	L	PF	PA	PD	Pts
1	Australia	3	3	0	231	203	+28	6
2	Canada	3	2	1	210	187	+23	5
3	Germany	3	1	2	184	222	−38	4
4	Egypt	3	0	3	216	229	−13	3

Source: FIBA
Rules for classification: 1) Points; 2) Head-to-head results; 3) Points difference; 4) Points scored.

29 June 2024
14:30

Boxscore

Egypt	82–85	Australia
Scoring by quarter: 14–13, 15–28, 20–21, 33–23
Pts: Essam 17; Rebs: Assran 8 Asts: El-Halawany 5		Pts: Beauchamp 19; Rebs: Sewell 5 Asts: Daniels, Sewell 4

Ahmet Cömert Sport Hall, Istanbul
Attendance: 85
Referees: Park Kyoung-jin (KOR), Wissam Zein (SYR), Sun Jian (CHN)

29 June 2024
15:00

Boxscore

Germany	52–77	Canada
Scoring by quarter: 21–19, 11–23, 4–19, 16–16
Pts: Duru 17; Rebs: Duru 12; Asts: Baumer, Duru 3		Pts: Ethier 22; Rebs: Ethier 8 Asts: Charles, Sadler 5

Sinan Erdem Dome, Istanbul
Attendance: 550
Referees: Krishna Domínguez (MEX), Yasmina Alcaraz (ESP), Yann Davidson (MAD)

30 June 2024
12:00

Boxscore

Australia	74–60	Germany
Scoring by quarter: 20–14, 6–18, 22–17, 26–11
Pts: Beauchamp 16; Rebs: Kuany 11; Asts: Daniels 5		Pts: Baumer, Scheffs 12; Rebs: Duru 8 Asts: Baumer 5

Ahmet Cömert Sport Hall, Istanbul
Attendance: 100
Referees: Beniamino Attard (ITA), Cecília Montgomery-Tóth (HUN), Teresa Stuck (USA)

30 June 2024
12:30

Boxscore

Canada	72–63	Egypt
Scoring by quarter: 14–22, 17–16, 19–13, 22–12
Pts: Sadler 30; Rebs: Ilic 12; Asts: Sadler 7		Pts: Shahin 19; Rebs: Essam 8 Asts: El-Gabry, Shahin 5

Sinan Erdem Dome, Istanbul
Attendance: 105
Referees: Ariadna Chueca (ESP), Carmelo de la Rosa (PUR), Amal Dahra (FRA)

2 July 2024
17:30

Boxscore

Egypt	71–72 (OT)	Germany
Scoring by quarter: 13–15, 15–10, 19–15, 14–21, Overtime: 10–11
Pts: El-Halawany 19; Rebs: Essam 12; Asts: El-Halawany, Shahin 5		Pts: Kayser 20; Rebs: Duru 11; Asts: Kayser 5

Ahmet Cömert Sport Hall, Istanbul
Attendance: 100
Referees: Beniamino Attard (ITA), Carlos Vélez (COL), Mohammad Taha (JOR)

2 July 2024
17:30

Boxscore

Canada	61–72	Australia
Scoring by quarter: 18–23, 14–16, 19–13, 10–20
Pts: Grandison, Sadler 11; Rebs: Ilic 10; Asts: Sadler 5		Pts: Daniels 14; Rebs: Daniels 10; Asts: Akuhar 4

Sinan Erdem Dome, Istanbul
Attendance: 450
Referees: Alan dos Santos (BRA), Maj Forsberg (DEN), Yann Davidson (MAD)

== Final round ==
=== Bracket ===
Round of 16
3 July
Philippines	45
United States	141
3 July
Argentina	71
Canada	77
3 July
Lithuania	76
China	70
3 July
New Zealand	85
Egypt	64
3 July
Puerto Rico	91
France	84
3 July
Italy (OT)	95
Australia	91
3 July
Spain	77
Guinea	55
3 July
Turkey	81
Germany	54

Quarter-finals
5 July
United States	111
Canada	60
5 July
Lithuania	65
New Zealand	73
5 July
Puerto Rico	65
Italy	83
5 July
Spain	57
Turkey	59

Semi-finals
6 July
United States	145
New Zealand	65
6 July
Italy	90
Turkey	63

Final
7 July
United States	129
Italy	88
Third place
7 July
New Zealand	78
Turkey	101

=== Round of 16 ===
3 July 2024
12:00

Boxscore

Puerto Rico	91–84	France
Scoring by quarter: 23–23, 21–19, 24–19, 23–23
Pts: Quiñones 42; Rebs: M. Santiago 7 Asts: Vigo 4		Pts: Yimga 23; Rebs: Yimga 14; Asts: Lemoine 7

Ahmet Cömert Sport Hall, Istanbul
Attendance: 130
Referees: Gvidas Gedvilas (LTU), Maj Forsberg (DEN), Park Kyoung-jin (KOR)

3 July 2024
12:30

Boxscore

Lithuania	76–70	China
Scoring by quarter: 15–19, 24–10, 18–23, 19–18
Pts: Mikalauskas 19; Rebs: Urbonas 10; Asts: Buika 6		Pts: Zhang 28; Rebs: Shen 9 Asts: He 5

Sinan Erdem Dome, Istanbul
Attendance: 150
Referees: Beniamino Attard (ITA), Cecília Montgomery-Tóth (HUN), Amal Dahra (FRA)

3 July 2024
14:30

Boxscore

Philippines	45–141	United States
Scoring by quarter: 13–43, 10–37, 12–26, 10–35
Pts: Ludovice 15; Rebs: Daja 5 Asts: Williams 3		Pts: Peat 22; Rebs: Stokes 10; Asts: Cay. Boozer 9

Ahmet Cömert Sport Hall, Istanbul
Attendance: 150
Referees: Viola Györgyi (NOR), Mehmet Karabilecen (TUR), Sara El-Sharnouby (EGY)

3 July 2024
15:00

Boxscore

Spain	77–55	Guinea
Scoring by quarter: 34–11, 7–15, 20–13, 16–16
Pts: Del Pino 17; Rebs: Villar 8 Asts: Huelves, Kemu 4		Pts: A. Touré 22; Rebs: Diané 10; Asts: Savane 4

Sinan Erdem Dome, Istanbul
Attendance: 230
Referees: Waseem Husainy (CAN), Sun Jian (CHN), Mbaye Seye (SEN)

3 July 2024
17:00

Boxscore

New Zealand	85–64	Egypt
Scoring by quarter: 32–11, 23–13, 12–21, 18–19
Pts: Crate 14; Rebs: Goodman, Plumtree 7 Asts: Jones 5		Pts: Assran 21; Rebs: Assran 9 Asts: El-Halawany 5

Ahmet Cömert Sport Hall, Istanbul
Attendance: 120
Referees: Carmelo de la Rosa (PUR), Yann Davidson (MAD), Yasmina Alcaraz (ESP)

3 July 2024
17:30

Boxscore

Italy	95–91 (OT)	Australia
Scoring by quarter: 15–16, 20–25, 22–22, 22–16, Overtime: 16–12
Pts: Garavaglia 19; Rebs: Perez 11; Asts: Perez 9		Pts: Nyuon 22; Rebs: Daniels 9 Asts: Daniels 8

Sinan Erdem Dome, Istanbul
Attendance: 300
Referees: Carlos Vélez (COL), Maripier Malo (CAN), Daigo Urushima (JPN)

3 July 2024
19:30

Boxscore

Argentina	71–77	Canada
Scoring by quarter: 12–11, 22–23, 14–21, 23–22
Pts: Kropp 28; Rebs: Minzer 12; Asts: Minzer 9		Pts: Charles, Sadler 18; Rebs: Osaruyi 9 Asts: Sadler 4

Ahmet Cömert Sport Hall, Istanbul
Attendance: 100
Referees: Martin Horozov (BUL), Ariadna Chueca (ESP), Mohammad Taha (JOR)

3 July 2024
20:00

Boxscore

Turkey	81–54	Germany
Scoring by quarter: 22–9, 17–12, 17–16, 25–17
Pts: Ustun 18; Rebs: Kara 10; Asts: Onat 6		Pts: Duru 11; Rebs: three players 3 Asts: Duru, Scheffs 2

Sinan Erdem Dome, Istanbul
Attendance: 650
Referees: Alan dos Santos (BRA), Nicolas Fernandes (AUS), Fernando Leite (BRA)

=== 9–16th classification playoffs ===
Classification quarterfinals
5 July
Philippines	67
Argentina	83
5 July
China	73
Egypt	85
5 July
France	96
Australia	71
5 July
Guinea	65
Germany	69

Classification semifinals
6 July
Argentina	90
Egypt	72
6 July
France	91
Germany	43

Ninth place match
7 July
Argentina	65
France	83
Eleventh place match
7 July
Egypt	65
Germany	88

Classification semifinals
6 July
Philippines	66
China	85
6 July
Australia	78
Guinea	98

13th place match
7 July
China	105
Guinea	101
15th place match
7 July
Philippines	53
Australia	115

==== 9–16th place quarterfinals ====
5 July 2024
12:00

Boxscore

China	73–85	Egypt
Scoring by quarter: 23–18, 13–20, 21–21, 16–26
Pts: Li 19; Rebs: Wang 10; Asts: Li 7		Pts: El-Sawy, Essam 18; Rebs: Essam 13; Asts: Fady 7

Ahmet Cömert Sport Hall, Istanbul
Attendance: 80
Referees: Krishna Domínguez (CHI), Jean Ruhamiriza (RWA), Mbaye Seye (SEN)

5 July 2024
14:30

Boxscore

Philippines	67–83	Argentina
Scoring by quarter: 15–27, 16–26, 17–16, 19–14
Pts: Velasquez 17; Rebs: Daja 9 Asts: Ludovice 5		Pts: Torriani 15; Rebs: Kropp 9 Asts: Torriani 7

Ahmet Cömert Sport Hall, Istanbul
Attendance: 70
Referees: Beniamino Attard (ITA), Carmelo de la Rosa (PUR), Yasmina Alcaraz (ESP)

5 July 2024
17:00

Boxscore

Guinea	65–69	Germany
Scoring by quarter: 19–20, 12–26, 13–10, 21–13
Pts: Diané 23; Rebs: Diané 18; Asts: Savane, S. Touré 3		Pts: Crnjac, Stojic 13; Rebs: Duru 9 Asts: Scheffs, Stojic 5

Ahmet Cömert Sport Hall, Istanbul
Attendance: 100
Referees: Maj Forsberg (DEN), Wissam Zein (SYR), Teresa Stuck (USA)

5 July 2024
19:30

Boxscore

France	96–71	Australia
Scoring by quarter: 24–10, 30–26, 24–14, 18–21
Pts: Naji 16; Rebs: Allard, Yimga 5 Asts: Bracq, Lemoine 4		Pts: Daniels, Sewell 13; Rebs: Nyuon 5 Asts: Cheesman 5

Ahmet Cömert Sport Hall, Istanbul
Attendance: 100
Referees: Martin Horozov (BUL), Cecília Montgomery-Tóth (HUN), Mohammad Taha (JOR)

==== 13–16th place semifinals ====
6 July 2024
12:00

Boxscore

China	85–66	Philippines
Scoring by quarter: 29–12, 26–20, 13–11, 17–23
Pts: Li 24; Rebs: Li 12; Asts: Li 4		Pts: Ludovice 15; Rebs: Ludovice, Morales 6 Asts: Ludovice 4

Ahmet Cömert Sport Hall, Istanbul
Attendance: 70
Referees: Krishna Domínguez (CHI), Mohammad Taha (JOR), Amal Dahra (FRA)

6 July 2024
14:30

Boxscore

Guinea	98–78	Australia
Scoring by quarter: 30–15, 13–19, 22–19, 33–25
Pts: A. Touré 36; Rebs: A. Touré 10; Asts: S. Touré 8		Pts: Walker 15; Rebs: Daniels 7 Asts: Beauchamp, Daniels 5

Ahmet Cömert Sport Hall, Istanbul
Attendance: 100
Referees: Beniamino Attard (ITA), Yasmina Alcaraz (ESP), Jean Ruhamiriza (RWA)

===== 15th place game =====
7 July 2024
10:30

Boxscore

Australia	115–53	Philippines
Scoring by quarter: 31–16, 25–11, 32–13, 27–13
Pts: Daniels 28; Rebs: Robinson 9 Asts: Robinson 7		Pts: Morales 17; Rebs: Morales 9 Asts: Ludovice 6

Ahmet Cömert Sport Hall, Istanbul
Attendance: 100
Referees: Viola Györgyi (NOR), Waseem Husainy (CAN), Mbaye Seye (SEN)

===== 13th place game =====
7 July 2024
13:00

Boxscore

Guinea	101–105	China
Scoring by quarter: 27–22, 21–23, 18–27, 35–33
Pts: A. Touré 50; Rebs: Diané 10; Asts: N. Touré, S. Touré 8		Pts: Zhang 32; Rebs: Chen, Wang 6 Asts: Li 8

Ahmet Cömert Sport Hall, Istanbul
Attendance: 70
Referees: Maj Forsberg (DEN), Wissam Zein (SYR), Teresa Stuck (USA)

==== 9–12th place semifinals ====
6 July 2024
17:00

Boxscore

Egypt	72–90	Argentina
Scoring by quarter: 18–26, 22–21, 23–22, 9–21
Pts: Essam 15; Rebs: Assran 11; Asts: El-Halawany 7		Pts: Minzer 23; Rebs: Minzer 7 Asts: Minzer 7

Ahmet Cömert Sport Hall, Istanbul
Attendance: 50
Referees: Ariadna Chueca (ESP), Park Kyoung-jin (KOR), Teresa Stuck (USA)

6 July 2024
19:30

Boxscore

Germany	43–91	France
Scoring by quarter: 4–30, 10–22, 17–19, 12–20
Pts: Kayser, Murray 8 Rebs: Bennefeld 5 Asts: Brüggemann 2		Pts: Boulefaa 20; Rebs: Allard 7 Asts: Naji 6

Ahmet Cömert Sport Hall, Istanbul
Attendance: 100
Referees: Maripier Malo (CAN), Carmelo de la Rosa (PUR), Sun Jian (CHN)

===== Eleventh place game =====
7 July 2024
15:30

Boxscore

Germany	88–65	Egypt
Scoring by quarter: 23–17, 23–16, 23–12, 19–20
Pts: Crnjac 19; Rebs: Baumer, Lastring 5 Asts: Bruggemann 4		Pts: El-Halawany, Magdy 14; Rebs: Mowafak 6 Asts: Mowafak 4

Ahmet Cömert Sport Hall, Istanbul
Attendance: 75
Referees: Krishna Domínguez (CHI), Mehmet Karabilecen (TUR), Amal Dahra (FRA)

===== Ninth place game =====
7 July 2024
18:00

Boxscore

France	83–65	Argentina
Scoring by quarter: 15–16, 27–14, 18–20, 23–15
Pts: Ebunangombe 16; Rebs: Noa Kouakou-Heugue, Soliman 5 Asts: three players 5		Pts: Kropp 18; Rebs: Cifuentes, Kropp 7 Asts: Torriani 5

Ahmet Cömert Sport Hall, Istanbul
Referees: Martin Horozov (BUL), Yasmina Alcaraz (ESP), Daigo Urushima (JPN)

=== Quarterfinals ===
5 July 2024
12:30

Boxscore

Lithuania	65–73	New Zealand
Scoring by quarter: 19–17, 18–13, 11–19, 17–24
Pts: Urbonas 16; Rebs: Butajevas 16; Asts: Urbonas 5		Pts: Goodman 19; Rebs: Jones 13; Asts: Goodman, Jones 3

Sinan Erdem Dome, Istanbul
Attendance: 110
Referees: Ariadna Chueca (ESP), Park Kyoung-jin (KOR), Daigo Urushima (JPN)

5 July 2024
15:00

Boxscore

United States	111–60	Canada
Scoring by quarter: 37–12, 29–15, 27–14, 18–19
Pts: Dybantsa 18; Rebs: Cam. Boozer, Cenac 10; Asts: Dybantsa 6		Pts: Sadler 14; Rebs: Osaruyi 8 Asts: Charles 5

Sinan Erdem Dome, Istanbul
Attendance: 450
Referees: Viola Györgyi (NOR), Mehmet Karabilecen (TUR), Fernando Leite (BRA)

5 July 2024
17:30

Boxscore

Puerto Rico	65–83	Italy
Scoring by quarter: 18–25, 18–17, 15–19, 14–22
Pts: Quiñones 21; Rebs: Stewart Jr. 12; Asts: Quiñones 4		Pts: Perez 16; Rebs: Perez 10; Asts: Mathis, Perez 4

Sinan Erdem Dome, Istanbul
Attendance: 650
Referees: Alan dos Santos (BRA), Nicolas Fernandes (AUS), Yann Davidson (MAD)

5 July 2024
20:00

Boxscore

Spain	57–59	Turkey
Scoring by quarter: 16–26, 19–8, 9–15, 13–10
Pts: Gimenez 20; Rebs: Campoy 17; Asts: Villar 5		Pts: Onat 16; Rebs: Selim Kara 12; Asts: Onat 9

Sinan Erdem Dome, Istanbul
Attendance: 1,689
Referees: Gvidas Gedvilas (LTU), Maripier Malo (CAN), Carlos Vélez (COL)

=== 5–8th classification playoffs ===
Classification semifinals
6 July
Canada	104
Lithuania (OT)	106
6 July
Puerto Rico	65
Spain	58

Fifth place match
7 July
Lithuania	96
Puerto Rico	82
Seventh place match
7 July
Canada	71
Spain	80

==== 5–8th place semifinals ====
6 July 2024
11:30

Boxscore

Lithuania	106–104 (OT)	Canada
Scoring by quarter: 21–20, 19–14, 29–29, 19–25, Overtime: 18–16
Pts: Urbonas 22; Rebs: Butajevas 19; Asts: Liutkevičius 11		Pts: Charles 32; Rebs: Ilic 8 Asts: Charles 5

Sinan Erdem Dome, Istanbul
Attendance: 140
Referees: Alan dos Santos (BRA), Wissam Zein (SYR), Sara El-Sharnouby (EGY)

6 July 2024
14:00

Boxscore

Spain	58–65	Puerto Rico
Scoring by quarter: 17–13, 16–20, 12–17, 13–15
Pts: Del Pino 9 Rebs: Campoy 13; Asts: Villar 4		Pts: R. Santiago 15; Rebs: Stewart Jr. 7 Asts: Quiñones, Roman 5

Sinan Erdem Dome, Istanbul
Attendance: 190
Referees: Gvidas Gedvilas (LTU), Viola Györgyi (NOR), Mehmet Karabilecen (TUR)

==== Seventh place game ====
7 July 2024
11:30

Boxscore

Spain	80–71	Canada
Scoring by quarter: 20–19, 22–14, 12–19, 26–19
Pts: Campoy 20; Rebs: Campoy 13; Asts: Villar 7		Pts: Charles 16; Rebs: Ilic, Meyer 6 Asts: Charles 5

Sinan Erdem Dome, Istanbul
Attendance: 125
Referees: Carmelo de la Rosa (PUR), Park Kyoung-jin (KOR), Cecília Montgomery-Tóth (HUN)

==== Fifth place game ====
7 July 2024
14:00

Boxscore

Puerto Rico	82–96	Lithuania
Scoring by quarter: 17–20, 14–24, 27–22, 24–30
Pts: Rosa 24; Rebs: Vigo 10; Asts: Roman 4		Pts: Liutkevičius 23; Rebs: Butajevas, Urbonas 8 Asts: Urbonas 6

Sinan Erdem Dome, Istanbul
Attendance: 225
Referees: Maripier Malo (CAN), Carlos Vélez (COL), Fernando Leite (BRA)

=== Semifinals ===
6 July 2024
17:00

Boxscore

New Zealand	65–145	United States
Scoring by quarter: 13–34, 21–35, 13–35, 18–41
Pts: Crate, Plumtree 12; Rebs: Jones 6 Asts: Cate, Reed 3		Pts: McCoy, Peat 19; Rebs: Cam. Boozer 11; Asts: Cay. Boozer 9

Sinan Erdem Dome, Istanbul
Attendance: 600
Referees: Waseem Husainy (CAN), Cecília Montgomery-Tóth (HUN), Yann Davidson (MAD)

6 July 2024
20:00

Boxscore

Turkey	63–90	Italy
Scoring by quarter: 15–23, 11–19, 15–26, 22–22
Pts: Coşkun 14; Rebs: Kara, Onat 5 Asts: three players 3		Pts: Garavaglia 18; Rebs: Perez 12; Asts: Carnevale 4

Sinan Erdem Dome, Istanbul
Attendance: 2,900
Referees: Martin Horozov (BUL), Nicolas Fernandes (AUS), Fernando Leite (BRA)

=== Third place game ===
7 July 2024
17:00

Boxscore

Turkey	101–78	New Zealand
Scoring by quarter: 25–16, 23–17, 25–20, 28–25
Pts: Ustun 27; Rebs: Onat, Ustun 8 Asts: three players 4		Pts: Goodman 25; Rebs: Kiss 13; Asts: Plumtree 5

Sinan Erdem Dome, Istanbul
Attendance: 2,300
Referees: Beniamino Attard (ITA), Nicolas Fernandes (AUS), Yann Davidson (MAD)

=== Final ===
7 July 2024
20:00

Boxscore

Italy	88–129	United States
Scoring by quarter: 19–32, 17–41, 27–27, 25–29
Pts: Lonati 20; Rebs: Perez 8 Asts: Perez 8		Pts: Peat 26; Rebs: Cam. Boozer 13; Asts: Mandaquit 10

Sinan Erdem Dome, Istanbul
Attendance: 2,500
Referees: Gvidas Gedvilas (LTU), Ariadna Chueca (ESP), Alan dos Santos (BRA)

== Final ranking ==
Rank	Team	Record
1st place, gold medalist(s)	United States	7–0
2nd place, silver medalist(s)	Italy	4–3
3rd place, bronze medalist(s)	Turkey	5–2
4th	New Zealand	4–3
5th	Lithuania	5–2
6th	Puerto Rico	3–4
7th	Spain	5–2
8th	Canada	3–4
9th	France	4–3
10th	Argentina	3–4
11th	Germany	3–4
12th	Egypt	1–6
13th	China	3–4
14th	Guinea	2–5
15th	Australia	4–3
16th	Philippines	0–7

== Statistics and awards ==
=== Statistical leaders ===
==== Players ====
Points

Name	PPG
(Guinea) Abdouramane Touré	23.0
(United States) Cameron Boozer	20.1
(Argentina) Tyler Kropp	20.0
(Guinea) Arafan Diane	19.1
(Turkey) Kaan Onat	18.9

Rebounds

Name	RPG
(Guinea) Arafan Diane	11.7
(Lithuania) Artūras Butajevas	11.3
(Spain) Ignacio Campoy	10.0
(United States) Cameron Boozer	9.9
(Germany) Declan Duru	8.6
(Italy) Maikcol Perez	8.6

Assists

Name	APG
(United States) Cayden Boozer	6.4
(United States) JJ Mandaquit	6.0
(United States) Tyran Stokes	5.6
(Lithuania) Dovydas Buika	4.8
(Turkey) Kaan Onat	4.7

Blocks

Name	BPG
(China) Huan Sinan	3.8
(Italy) Diego Garavaglia	2.0
(Turkey) Omar Essam	1.9
(Australia) Mading Kuany	1.7
(Canada) Stefan Ilic	1.7
(Italy) Luigi Suigo	1.7

Steals

Name	SPG
(Australia) Dash Daniels	3.6
(United States) Brandon McCoy Jr.	3.4
(Puerto Rico) Justin Roman	3.1
(Germany) Julis Baumer	3.0
(Argentina) Felipe Minzer	3.0

Efficiency

Name	EFFPG
(United States) Cameron Boozer	30.6
(Guinea) Arafan Diané	23.3
(Argentina) Felipe Minzer	22.1
(United States) Tyran Stokes	21.4
(United States) Koa Peat	21.0

=== Awards ===
The awards were announced on 7 July 2024.

All-Star Five
Guards	Forwards	Center
(United States) AJ Dybantsa (Turkey) Kaan Onat	(United States) Cameron Boozer (Italy) Maikcol Perez (New Zealand) Oscar Goodman	N/A
MVP: (United States) Cameron Boozer
All-Second Team
Guards	Forwards	Center
(Turkey) Derin Ustun	(United States) Tyran Stokes (United States) Koa Peat (Italy) Diego Garavaglia	(Lithuania) Artūras Butajevas
Best defensive player: (United States) Brandon McCoy Jr.
Best coach: (Italy) Giuseppe Mangone
