= Oscar Goodman (basketball) =

New Zealand basketball player (born 2007)

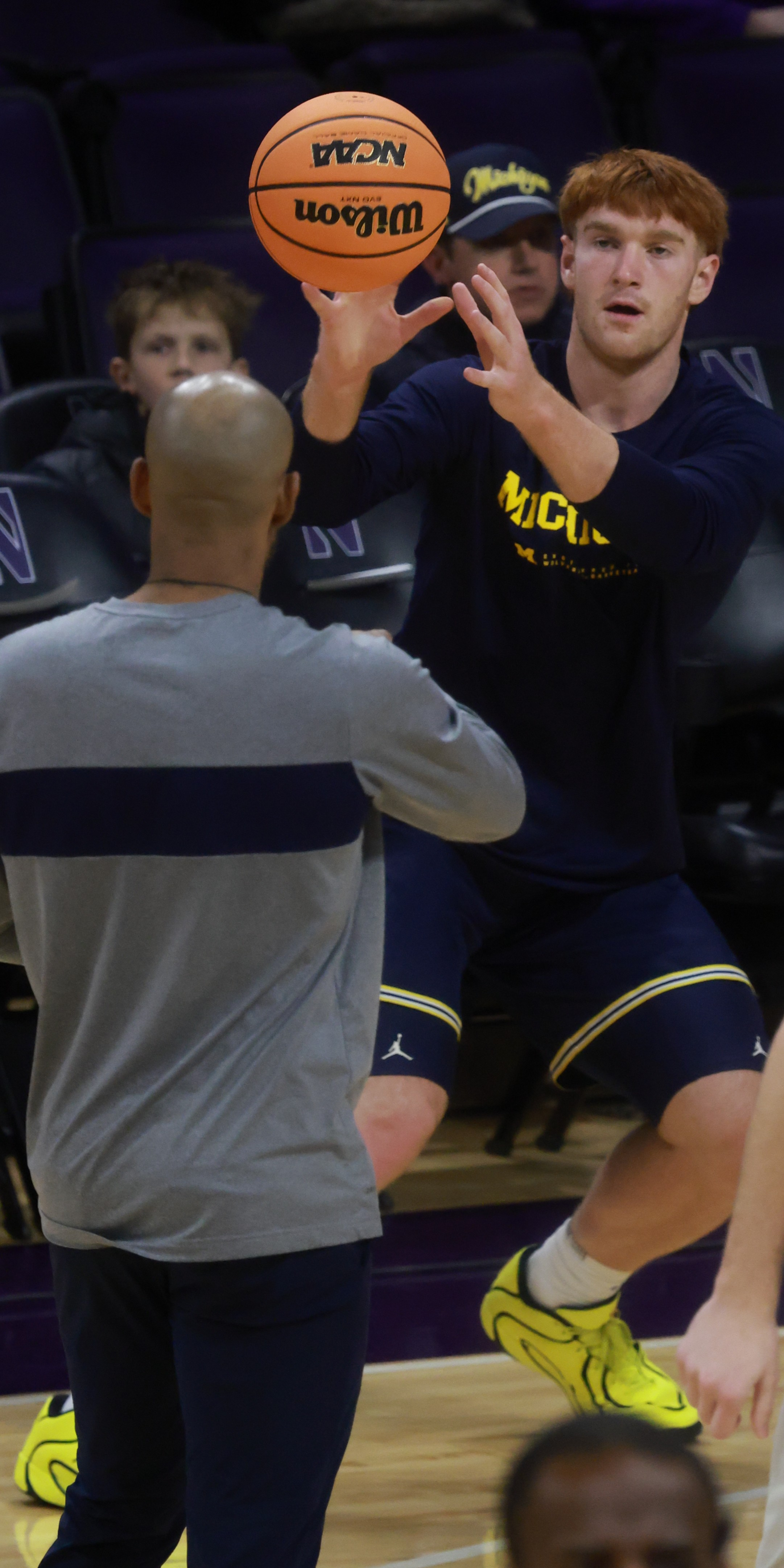
- Goodman for the 2025–26 Michigan Wolverines

No. 12 – Michigan Wolverines
- Position: Power forward
- League: Big Ten Conference

Personal information
- Born: 5 February 2007 (age 19) Ōpunake, New Zealand
- Listed height: 6 ft 7 in (2.01 m)
- Listed weight: 235 lb (107 kg)

Career information
- High school: New Plymouth (New Plymouth, New Zealand); NBA Global Academy (Canberra, Australia)
- College: Michigan (2025–present)

Career highlights
- NCAA champion (2026); FIBA U16 Asian Championship MVP (2023)
Medals
Men's basketball
Representing New Zealand
FIBA Under-16 Asia Cup
Silver medal – second place	2023 Qatar	Team
FIBA U15 Oceania Cup
Silver medal – second place	2022 Guam	Team

Oscar Goodman (born 5 February 2007) is a New Zealand college basketball player for the Michigan Wolverines. He was an NCAA national champion in 2026. Goodman represented the New Zealand under-15, 16 and 17 national team in several international youth competitions, earning first team all-tournament honours in 2022, 2023 and 2024; as well as MVP of the 2023 FIBA Under-16 Asian Championship. At age 17, he became one of the youngest players to ever represent the New Zealand national team, before joining the under-19 team.

== Early life and New Zealand career ==
Goodman was born on 5 February 2007 in Ōpunake, New Zealand. He is the eldest of five sons, born to former rowers Matt and Andie Goodman. At age 12, his family moved from Coromandel to South Taranaki, where basketball resources made it possible for him to become serious about the sport. By the time he was in under-14 competition he was noticed in New Zealand. Goodman attended New Plymouth Boys' High School.

He represented the silver medal New Zealand team at the 2022 FIBA Under-15 Oceania Championship, where he was the team's leading scorer and one of the all-tournament first team honorees (along with teammate Hayden Jones). Goodman averaged 11 points, 5.8 rebounds, 1.8 assists and 1.4 blocks, playing 19.9 minutes in 5 games. He was then selected for an NBA Academy development camp, and adapted to training in Canberra for months at a time away from his New Zealand home.

Goodman saw action for the Taranaki Airs of the New Zealand National Basketball League in April and May 2023. At the 2023 FIBA Under-16 Asian Championship, he earned tournament MVP honours for the silver medal New Zealand team. Despite the 79–76 championship game loss to Australia, he and teammate Lachlan Crate outnumbered the sole Australian selectee on the all-tournament team. Over the course of 6 games, Goodman averaged 14 points, 8.3 rebounds, 2.2 assists, 1.3 steals and 1.2 blocks in 22.5 minutes. It was the first time New Zealand had reached the championship game of the FIBA Under-16 Asia Cup.

In 2024, Goodman played semi-professional basketball for the BA Centre of Excellence of the NBL1 in the NBL1 East from April to June. The team is under Basketball Australia and run by the Australian Institute of Sport. That year Goodman earned 2024 FIBA Under-17 Basketball World Cup All-tournament first team honours. In 7 appearances, Goodman averaged 17 points, 6.3 rebounds, 3.0 assists and 1.4 steals in 26.6 minutes. Goodman was the first basketball player from New Zealand to earn All-tournament first team honours in a worldwide international basketball competition since 2002 (when Pero Cameron did so at the 2002 FIBA World Championship). His 2024 World Cup performance solidified his blue chip status as a top college basketball recruit. A few days after the World Cup, along with Julius Halaifonua, he led the NBA Global Academy to a victory in the fifth annual 2024 NBA Academy Games with a 6–0 record in mid-July.

Goodman visited Ann Arbor during the 12 October weekend and was leaning toward committing to Michigan by 15 October. With several major basketball programs expressing interest, Goodman elected to commit to Michigan basketball's 2025 recruiting class on 23 October 2024. He chose the Wolverines over offers from several programs, including Ohio State, Texas Tech and Georgetown (whom he visited before Michigan). At the time of his commitment, he was listed at between 6 ft 6 in (1.98 m) and 6 ft 8 in (2.03 m), and between 225 lb and 230 lbs. In November 2024, he was selected as one of the youngest players to ever make an open men's international debut as a member of the New Zealand men's national basketball team, competing in the 2025 FIBA Asia Cup qualification. He graduated high school in November 2024. After enrolling at Michigan for a semester, Goodman was selected to represent New Zealand in the 2025 FIBA Under-19 Basketball World Cup in Switzerland.

== College career ==
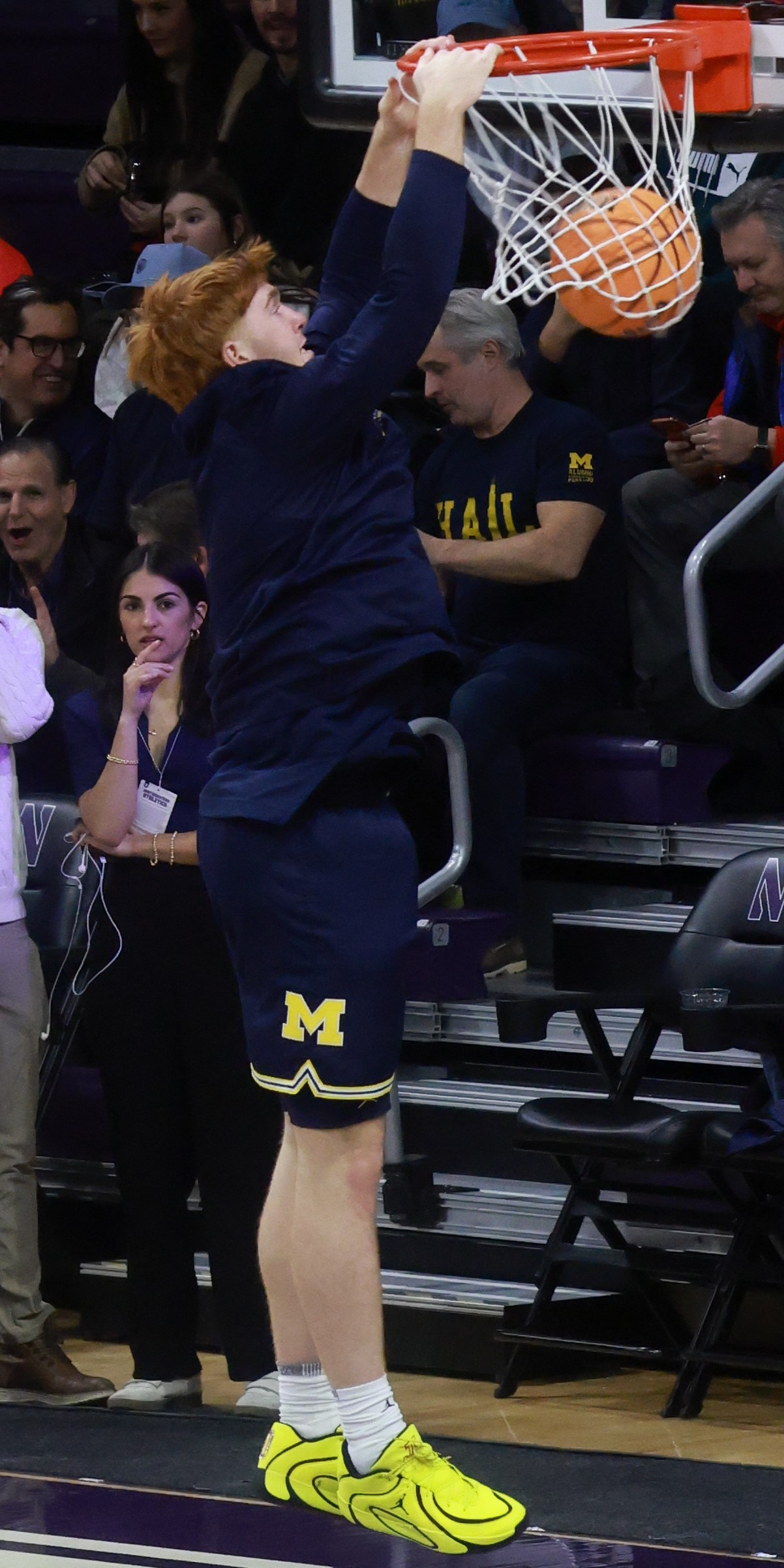
Goodman of the 2025–26 Wolverines

On January 7, 2025, Goodman enrolled early at the University of Michigan, joining the 2024–25 Wolverines team midseason. At the time of his enrolment, he was initially ranked as the 75th overall basketball player in the national class of 2025 by 247Sports. That same month, 247Sports switched him to their 2024 recruiting class, ranking him as the No. 101 overall player and No. 93 in the composite ranking. Goodman used the season to redshirt and was limited to practice only. Goodman debut in the 2025–26 Wolverines season-opening 121–78 victory against Oakland on November 3 with three points. One of his most memorable moments of the season was his dunk in the November 25, 2025 Players Era Festival contest against Auburn. On February 5, Goodman scored 6 points in a 110–69 victory against Penn State. The team won the championship at the 2026 NCAA Division I men's basketball tournament and tied the Big Ten Conference record for single-season wins. Goodman is regarded as the second player (men's or women's) from New Zealand to win an NCAA Division I basketball championship (Jack Salt, 2018–19 Virginia Cavaliers). Although his ingame playing time was limited, he successfully executed 4 dunks over the course of the season and developed by practicing against the Michigan's front line of Yaxel Lendeborg, Morez Johnson Jr. and Aday Mara.

With Moustapha Thiam sidelined, Goodman opened the season in the starting lineup for Michigan against Oakland on November 2, 2026. Goodman posted a career high 11-points and 8 rebounds in the November 15 game against William & Mary, contributing to the team's all-time record 75-point half and record 8 double-digit scorers.
