= Tyler Kropp =

Argentine-American basketball player (born 2007)

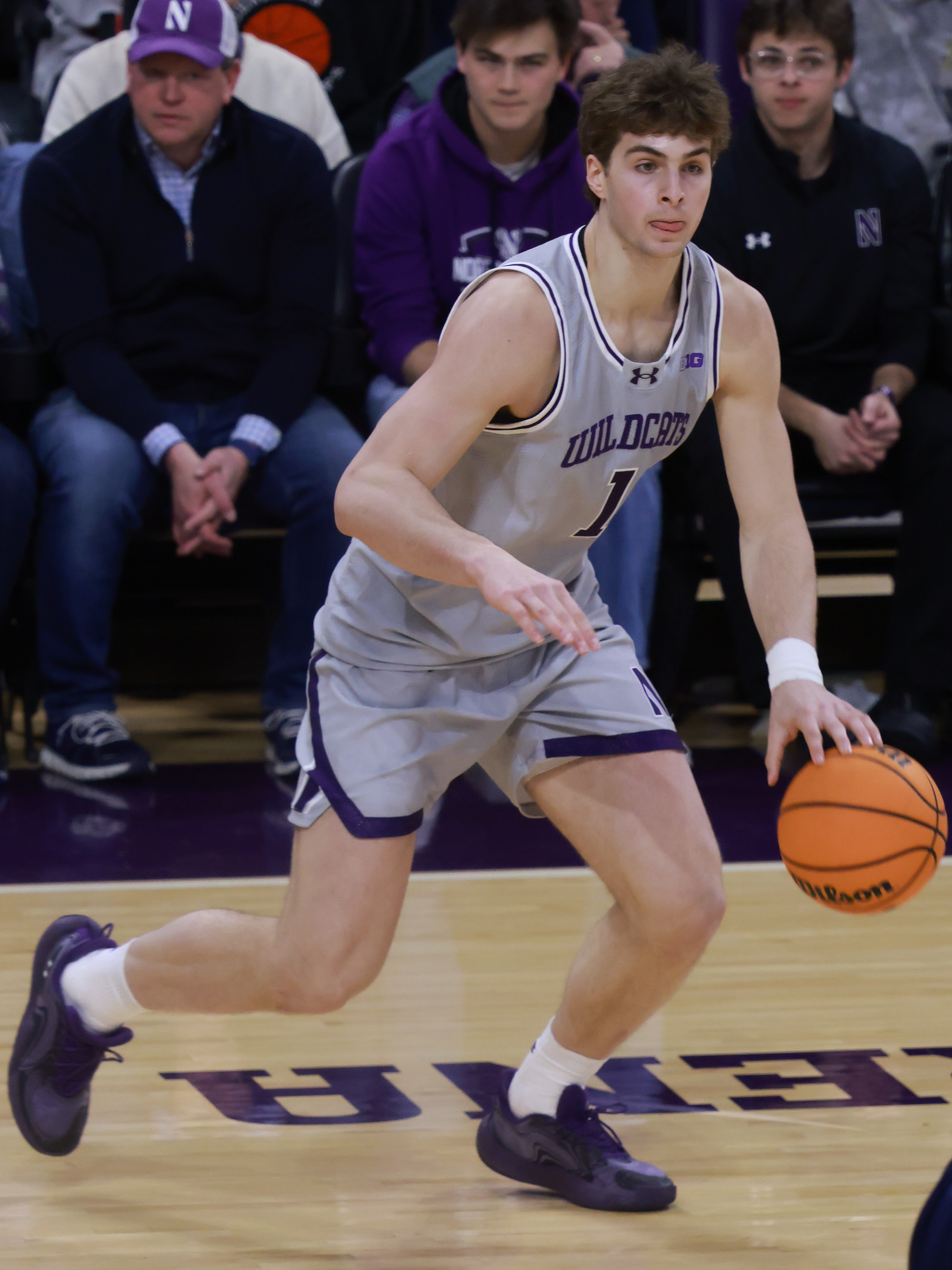
- Kropp for the 2025–26 Northwestern Wildcats

Washington State Cougars
- Position: Power forward
- Conference: Pac-12 Conference

Personal information
- Born: March 6, 2007 (age 19)
- Listed height: 6 ft 9 in (2.06 m)
- Listed weight: 230 lb (104 kg)

Career information
- High school: Olentangy Liberty (Powell, Ohio)
- College: Northwestern (2025–2026); Washington State (2026–present)
Medals
Men's basketball
Representing Argentina
FIBA Under-18 AmeriCup
Silver medal – second place	2024 Argentina	Team

Tyler Kropp (born March 6, 2007) is an Argentine-American college basketball player for the Washington State Cougars of the Pac-12 Conference. He previously played for the Northwestern Wildcats.

== Early life and high school ==
Kropp grew up in Powell, Ohio and attended Olentangy Liberty High School. He averaged 22.3 points and 11.0 rebounds per game during his junior season. Kropp was named second-team All-Ohio as a senior after averaging 19.0 points, 9.4 rebounds, and 3.0 assists per game. Kropp was rated a three-star recruit and committed to play college basketball at Northwestern over offers from Davidson, Dayton, Richmond, and Harvard.

== College career ==
Kropp started 10 games as a freshman while averaging 3.1 points and 2.1 rebounds per game. He opted to transfer to Washington State following the season.

== National team career ==
Kropp competes for Argentina in international play. He played in the 2023 FIBA Under-16 Americas Championship and averaged 10.2 points and 10.5 rebounds over six games as Argentina finished fourth. Kropp played in the 2024 FIBA U18 AmeriCup and was named to the All-Tournament team after leading the competition in both scoring and rebounding as Argentina finished as the runner-up. He was also selected to play in the 2024 FIBA Under-17 Basketball World Cup, where he averaged 20 points and 7.4 rebounds per game. Kropp led the 2025 FIBA Under-19 Basketball World Cup in scoring with a 21.7 points per game average and was named to the second team of the All-Tournament Team.

== Career statistics ==
=== College ===
Year	Team	GP	GS	MPG	FG%	3P%	FT%	RPG	APG	SPG	BPG	PPG
2025–26	Northwestern	31	10	11.9	.442	.273	.923	2.1	.3	.4	.3	3.1

== Personal life ==
Kropp's mother, Mabel, was born and raised in Argentina, and moved to the United States to attend Ohio State University.
