= Raúl Villar =

Spanish basketball player born 2007

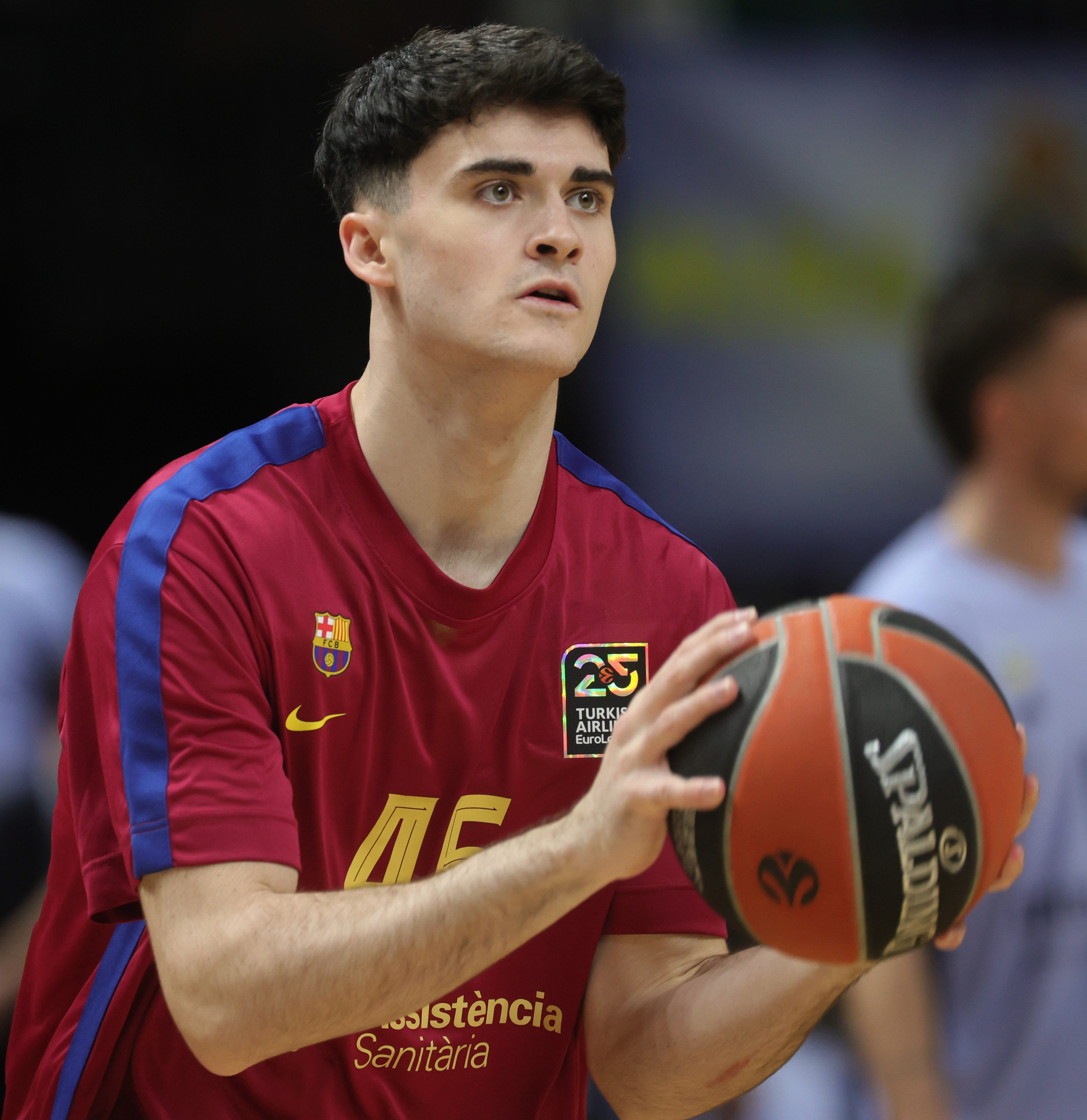
- Villar with FC Barcelona in 2025

No. 4 – Charlotte 49ers
- Position: Point guard
- League: American Athletic Conference

Personal information
- Born: 13 October 2007 (age 19) Barcelona, Spain
- Listed height: 1.90 m (6 ft 3 in)

Career information
- College: Charlotte (2025–present)
- Playing career: 2022–present

Career history
- 2022–2025: FC Barcelona
- 2022–2025: →FC Barcelona B
Medals
Men's basketball
Representing Spain
FIBA U20 EuroBasket
Bronze medal – third place	2026 Slovenia	Team
FIBA Europe U18 Championship
Gold medal – first place	2025 Serbia	Team

Raúl Villar Cornago (born 13 October 2007), is a Spanish college basketball player for Charlotte 49ers of the American Athletic Conference (AAC). He has also played in the Spanish national team's youth ranks. Standing at 6 ft 3 in (1.90 m), Villar plays in the point guard position.

His older brother Rafa Villar is a professional basketball player for Baskonia.

== Early life and youth career ==
Growing up in l'Hospitalet de Llobregat, Raúl Villar started playing basketball in the youth ranks of a local team, CB L'Hospitalet. He would later join the FC Barcelona youth ranks in 2018, starting at Barcelona's mini category. He made his way through the team's youth categories until reaching FC Barcelona B in 2022, playing in the Liga EBA.

== Professional career ==
Villar made his professional debut in February 2025, while still a FC Barcelona B player. He played his first minutes for the FC Barcelona first team in a EuroLeague game against traditional rivals Real Madrid in the 2024-25 season. He was the first player in FC Barcelona's history to start in the mini team and to play in each youth category until reaching the first team.

Villar would go on to make his Liga ACB debut only a few days later, in March, 2025. It would be in a 2024-25 season win against CB Breogán at the Palau Blaugrana.

== National team career ==
Villar has played in several international tournaments with the youth ranks of the Spanish national team, playing for the U17 team in the 2024 U17 World Cup.

== Career statistics ==
Legend
GP	Games played	GS	Games started	MPG	Minutes per game
FG%	Field goal percentage	3P%	3-point field goal percentage	FT%	Free throw percentage
RPG	Rebounds per game	APG	Assists per game	SPG	Steals per game
BPG	Blocks per game	PPG	Points per game	**Bold**	Career high

=== College ===
Year	Team	GP	GS	MPG	FG%	3P%	FT%	RPG	APG	SPG	BPG	PPG
2025–26	Charlotte	32	1	11.9	.388	.296	.815	1.6	1.2	0.6	0.0	3.3
