= Luigi Suigo =

Italian basketball player (born 2007)

No. 19 – Villanova Wildcats
- Position: Center
- League: Big East Conference

Personal information
- Born: 29 January 2007 (age 19) Tradate, Varese, Italy
- Listed height: 7 ft 3 in (2.21 m)
- Listed weight: 289 lb (131 kg)

Career information
- College: Villanova (2026–present)
- Playing career: 2023–present

Career history
- 2023–2025: Olimpia Milano
- 2025–2026: Mega
Medals
Men's basketball
Representing Italy
FIBA U17 World Cup
Silver medal – second place	2024 Turkey	Team

Luigi Suigo (born 29 January 2007) is an Italian college basketball player for the Villanova Wildcats of the Big East Conference. He previously played for professional teams Olimpia Milano and Mega from 2023 to 2026. He has also represented the Italy national team.

== Early life and youth career ==
Luigi Suigo was born on 29 January 2007, in Tradate, of the Varese province. He began playing basketball at age five, later joining a local youth team at age seven. His early development was interrupted by a heel injury related to a growth spurt, which sidelined him for five years. During this period, Suigo continued to practice independently, citing James Harden as his idol, particularly regarding his perimeter play and step-back shooting technique.

== Professional career ==
=== Olimpia Milano (2023–2025) ===
Suigo played for the youth teams of Pallacanestro Varese before joining the Olimpia Milano junior team in 2022. During his tenure, he became a two-time Italian youth champion and earned all-star honors. He gained further recognition at the 2024 Adidas Next Generation Tournament, where he averaged 14.5 points and 7.5 rebounds per game; including a 21 point, eleven rebound performance in the final against Žalgiris, earning him a selection to the All-Tournament Team.

While a member of the youth system, Suigo was occasionally called up to the senior squad of Olimpia Milano. He made his first appearance in 2023 and totaled two senior games across two seasons before leaving the club.

=== Mega Basket (2025–2026) ===
On 16 July 2025, Suigo signed with Mega Basket. On 5 October 2025, Suigo made his ABA League debut, recording 11 points and five rebounds in a 117–81 loss against Cedevita Olimpija.

On 8 February 2026, Suigo tallied twelve points and eleven rebounds in a 94–89 loss against Spartak Subotica, earning his first double-double in his professional career. On 21 February 2026, Suigo tallied a career-high 23 points, eight rebounds and two assists in a 106–84 loss against Crvena zvezda in the final of the Radivoj Korać Cup. On 26 April 2026, in his final game of the ABA season, Suigo scored three points and tallied one steal in a 98–89 win against Borac Čačak. In 26 ABA League games, Suigo averaged 7.9 points, 5.1 rebounds, and 1.0 blocks in 17.8 minutes per game. Following the end of the season, Suigo declared for the 2026 NBA draft, while evaluating his options to play collegiate basketball. On 13 June 2026, Suigo withdrew from the 2026 NBA draft and committed to Villanova University.

== National team career ==
=== Junior national team ===
Suigo was a member of the Italy U-17 national basketball team that won the silver medal at the 2024 FIBA Under-17 World Cup. Over seven tournament games, he averaged 7.0 points, 6.6 rebounds and 1.7 blocks per game. Suigo was also a member of the Italy U-18 national basketball team that participated at the 2024 FIBA U18 EuroBasket. Over seven tournament games, he averaged 7.0 points, 7.6 rebounds and 1.9 blocks per game.

=== Senior national team ===
Suigo represented Italy during 2027 FIBA Basketball World Cup qualification. In his four appearances, he averaged 2.3 points and 1.8 rebounds in 7.4 minutes per game.

== Career statistics ==
Legend
GP	Games played	GS	Games started	MPG	Minutes per game
FG%	Field goal percentage	3P%	3-point field goal percentage	FT%	Free throw percentage
RPG	Rebounds per game	APG	Assists per game	SPG	Steals per game
BPG	Blocks per game	PPG	Points per game	**Bold**	Career high

=== ABA League ===
Year	Team	League	GP	MPG	FG%	3P%	FT%	RPG	APG	SPG	BPG	PPG
2025–26	Mega	ABA League	26	17.9	.535	.271	.647	5.1	0.7	0.5	1.0	7.9
