= Abdou Toure =

Guinean basketball player (born 2007)

No. 1 – Arkansas Razorbacks
- Position: Shooting guard / small forward
- League: Southeastern Conference

Personal information
- Born: August 14, 2007 (age 19) New Haven, Connecticut, U.S.
- Listed height: 6 ft 5 in (1.96 m)
- Listed weight: 205 lb (93 kg)

Career information
- High school: Notre Dame (West Haven, Connecticut)
- College: Arkansas (2026–present)

Career highlights
- Allen Iverson National Player of the Year (2026); Nike Hoop Summit (2026)

Abdouramane Toure (born August 14, 2007) is a college basketball player for the Arkansas Razorbacks. He was a consensus five-star recruit and one of the top players in the 2026 class. Born in the United States, Toure represents Guinea in international competition.

== Early life ==
Toure attended Notre Dame High School in West Haven, Connecticut, where he played four years of varsity basketball for the Green Knights. He earned a starting role as a freshman and helped his team reach the Connecticut Interscholastic Athletic Conference (CIAC) Division I semifinals, garnering second-team All-Southern Connecticut Conference (SCC) honors.

Toure stepped into a larger role in his sophomore season due to the departure of several key starters. He averaged 21.8 points, 7.5 rebounds, 3.6 assists, two steals, and two blocks per game, (Note: His averages are alternatively reported as 22 points, seven rebounds, four assists, two blocks, and 1.8 steals per game) leading Notre Dame to a 28–0 record and its first-ever CIAC Division I state championship title. Toure also broke the school's single-game scoring record with 49 points in a 76–65 win over Wilbur Cross High School on February 14, 2024. He was named the Connecticut MaxPreps Player of the Year and the CT Insider Player of the Year. That offseason, Toure helped Notre Dame win the inaugural Vertical Hoops EuroCup, an invitational under-17 tournament held in Poland. He also participated in the Under Armour Elite 24 game, where he scored 16 points and made the game-winning shot.

As a junior, Toure averaged 25.2 points, 6.5 rebounds, 3.3 assists, and 2.3 steals per game, leading Notre Dame to a 25–2 record and their second straight CIAC Division I state championship title. On December 30, 2024, he scored his 1,000th career point against Edgewater High School during the Kingdom of the Sun tournament in Florida. In the state championship game, Toure posted 27 points and 20 rebounds in a 68–55 win over Saint Bernard School. In addition to repeating as the Connecticut MaxPreps Player of the Year and the CT Insider Player of the Year, he was also named the Connecticut Gatorade Player of the Year. In the offseason, Toure participated in the Adidas Eurocamp and the NBPA Top 100 Camp.

As a senior, Toure averaged 24.6 points, seven rebounds, three assists, and two steals per game. He led the Green Knights to a 22–4 record and an appearance in the CIAC Division I state semifinals. At the City of Palms Classic in December 2025, Toure helped Notre Dame win the Sunshine Series championship after averaging 39 points per game, earning MVP honors for the series. He also won the slam dunk contest without prior notice and without warming up. The following week, Toure averaged 28 points per game at the Beach Ball Classic. On January 17, 2026, he scored 31 points in a highly anticipated matchup against Jason Crowe Jr. and Inglewood High School at the Hoophall Classic, converting a slam dunk which was ranked number one on the SportsCenter Daily Top 10 Plays.

Toure was named the Allen Iverson National Player of the Year. He collected second-team All-American honors from MaxPreps and the Naismith Awards. Toure repeated as the Connecticut Gatorade Player of the Year, Connecticut MaxPreps Player of the Year, and CT Insider Player of the Year, and finished his career as Notre Dame's all-time leading scorer with 1,981 points. He was selected to play in the Nike Hoop Summit as a member of Team World, as well as the Iverson Classic and the Ballislife x SeaWorld All-American Game. Regionally, Toure was selected to play in the inaugural Thank You Basketball All-Star Game and the 63rd JCC Schoolboy/Schoolgirl Classic, which were both scheduled for the same day. He earned MVP honors at the former. Toure graduated from Notre Dame in May 2026.

Outside of school, Toure played with Expressions Elite in the Nike Elite Youth Basketball League (EYBL). He also played on the Adidas 3SSB 17U circuit with the Boston Amateur Basketball Club (BABC) in 2025, earning second-team all-circuit honors after averaging 15.7 points and 6.6 rebounds per game.

=== Recruiting ===
Toure is a consensus five-star recruit and one of the top players in the 2026 class, according to major recruiting services. He was considered a consensus top-50 prospect during his junior season, but finished his career as a consensus top-15 recruit in the class of 2026 rankings. Toure received his first four NCAA Division I offers in late 2023 from Bryant, Rutgers, Sacred Heart, and Yale. The list had doubled to eight by mid-July 2024, before growing to 16 offers by the end of December. Toure ultimately collected over 25 Division I offers.

On August 20, 2025, Toure announced his top seven choices: Arkansas, Florida State, Louisville, Maryland, Oregon, Providence, and UConn. The following month, he named Arkansas, Providence, and UConn as his three finalists. On October 3, 2025, Toure verbally committed to playing college basketball for the Arkansas Razorbacks for head coach John Calipari. He signed with the Razorbacks in November.

== National team career ==
Toure represented Guinea at the 2024 FIBA Under-17 Basketball World Cup, where he averaged a tournament-leading 23 points to go along with 3.6 rebounds and two assists per game. The team was coached by his uncle, Ibrahima Toure, while two of his cousins, Nour Gassim Toure and Sekoul Toure, played alongside him. Toure scored 50 points in a 105–101 loss to China, tying the single-game scoring record for the event. He also recorded a 36-point, 10-rebound double-double in a 98–78 win over Australia.

== Personal life ==
Toure was born and raised in New Haven, Connecticut, to Mamoudou Toure and Bountou Camara, both natives of Guinea. His father played high school basketball at Hyde Leadership School, helping them reach the CIAC Class S championship games in 1999 and 2000, and became a longtime sales manager at a car dealership. Additionally, his uncle, Salif Boudie, played college basketball at Arkansas State and UMass Lowell.

Toure grew up as a Los Angeles Lakers fan. He has an older sister, Fatou, and two younger brothers: Massa and Baba.
