= Noa Kouakou-Heugue =

French basketball player (born 2007)

No. 00 – Élan Chalon
- Position: Power forward / center
- League: LNB Élite

Personal information
- Born: 28 April 2007 (age 19) Lille, France
- Listed height: 2.09 m (6 ft 10 in)
- Listed weight: 95 kg (209 lb)

Career information
- High school: INSEP (Paris, France)
- Playing career: 2023–present

Career history
- 2023–2025: Pôle France
- 2025–2026: Perth Wildcats
- 2026–present: Élan Chalon

Noa Kouakou-Heugue (born 28 April 2007) is a French professional basketball player for Élan Chalon of the LNB Élite.

== Early life and career ==
Kouakou-Heugue was born in Lille, France. He began playing basketball in the south of France at age 11. His junior club was ASVEL Villeurbanne.

In 2022, he joined INSEP in Paris. He debuted in the Nationale Masculine 1 in the 2023–24 season with Pôle France, averaging 3.4 points and 4.0 rebounds in 28 games. In the 2024–25 season, he played 34 games for Pôle France and averaged 9.7 points, 4.8 rebounds, 1.8 assists and 1.0 blocks per game.

In March 2025, he was named MVP of the Adidas Next Generation Tournament in Belgrade.

== Professional career ==
On 7 July 2025, Kouakou-Heugue signed with the Perth Wildcats of the Australian National Basketball League (NBL) as part of the league's Next Stars program. He was assigned a bench role as a back-up power forward or centre. Limited playing opportunities at the start of the 2025–26 season led to a dispute between Kouakou-Heugue and the Wildcats. Following a game on 2 November, he ceased attending training and matches while attempting to exit his two-year Next Star contract in order to return home to play for Élan Chalon. With the contract held by both the NBL and the Wildcats, neither party was willing to release him without a significant payout, which Élan Chalon was unwilling to provide. He subsequently returned to training alongside plans to see out his contract after two weeks away from the team. He finished the season having played 17 games as the Wildcats reached the playoffs, with season highs of 8 points and 4 rebounds in round six. On 22 April 2026, Kouakou-Heugue and the Wildcats parted ways.

On 24 June 2026, Kouakou-Heugue signed with Élan Chalon of the LNB Élite.

== National team career ==
Kouakou-Heugue played for the French under-16 national team at the 2023 FIBA U16 European Championship and the French under-17 national team at the 2024 FIBA Under-17 Basketball World Cup. With the French under-19 national team at the 2025 FIBA Under-19 Basketball World Cup, he averaged seven points, five rebounds and 1.6 blocks per game.

== Personal life ==
Kouakou-Heugue is of an Ivory Coast background.
