= Miles Sadler =

No. 1 – West Virginia Mountaineers
- Position: Point guard
- League: Big 12 Conference

Personal information
- Born: July 4, 2007 (age 19)
- Listed height: 6 ft 0 in (1.83 m)
- Listed weight: 170 lb (77 kg)

Career information
- High school: Bella Vista Prep (Scottsdale, Arizona)
- College: West Virginia (2026–present)

Miles Sadler (born July 4, 2007) is a Canadian college basketball player for the West Virginia Mountaineers.

== Early life ==
Sadler was born on July 4, 2007, and grew up in Brampton, Ontario, Canada. He later moved to the U.S. and first attended Dream City Christian School in Glendale, Arizona. After his sophomore year at Dream City, Sadler transferred to Bella Vista Prep in Scottsdale where, as a junior, he posted averages of 16 points, five assists, and four rebounds per game with the basketball team. As a senior, Sadler was named a high school All-American after averaging 18.5 points and 5.7 assists, leading Bella Vista to the 2026 Chipotle Nationals title and the Nike EYBL Scholastic Championship. In the Chipotle Nationals tournament, he posted 23.3 points and 8.3 assists per game.

Sadler was ranked a five-star prospect and one of the top-25 recruits in the class of 2026. He committed to play college basketball for the West Virginia Mountaineers, becoming the highest-ranked recruit in team history.

== College career ==
In his collegiate debut for the Mountaineers, Sadler posted 16 points and nine assists in a win over Niagara. The following game, he had 25 points and six assists against Stetson. Sadler was afterwards named the Big 12 Conference Freshman of the Week.

== International career ==
Sadler competed for Canada at the 2024 FIBA Under-17 Basketball World Cup, averaging 13.9 points per game.
