= Jilin Provincial Experimental School =

- 吉林省实验中学

Location
- 6565 Renmin Street, Changchun, Jilin (130022); Changchun; China

Information
- Type: Public
- Motto: 笃学 践行 求是 创新 (Learn, Practice, Seek Truth and Innovate)
- Established: 1948
- School district: Chaoyang District
- Headmaster: Yang Jun（杨军）
- Staff: 248
- Faculty: 228
- Enrollment: ~5,000
- Campus: Urban
- Nickname: 实验园 (Experiment Garden)
- Information: Flowery Path （花蹊）
- Website: Official website

Jilin Provincial Experimental School (Chinese: 吉林省实验中学; pinyin: Jílínshěng Shíyàn Zhōngxué) is a coeducational public middle school for both boarding and day students from grades 7 to 12 (ages 12 to 18). Founded in 1948, the school was originally located in Jilin City of Jilin, Northeast China. In 1955, along with the Provincial Government, the School moved to the new capital city Changchun. It is a key high school in Jilin Province and is listed the Top 100 Chinese High Schools

== Notable alumni ==
Yi Sha, Chinese mainland actor (Chinese: 沙溢).
