= Huan Sinan =

Chinese basketball player (born 2007)

Huan Sinan 郇斯楠
No. 33 – Purdue Boilermakers
- Position: Center
- Conference: Big Ten Conference

Personal information
- Born: May 8, 2007 (age 19) Nanjing, Jiangsu, China
- Listed height: 7 ft 1 in (2.16 m)
- Listed weight: 230 lb (104 kg)

Career information
- High school: Tsinghua University (Beijing, China); Windermere (Windermere, Florida); Georgetown Preparatory School (North Bethesda, Maryland)
- College: Purdue (2026–present)

Career highlights
- Nike Hoop Summit (2026)
Medals
Men's basketball
Representing China
FIBA U18 Asia Cup
Bronze medal – third place	2024 Amman
FIBA U16 Asia Cup
Bronze medal – third place	2023 Doha

Huan Sinan (Chinese: 郇斯楠; born May 8, 2007) is a Chinese college basketball player who plays as a center for the Purdue Boilermakers of the Big Ten Conference. He has represented China at multiple FIBA youth competitions.

He has an elder twin brother, Huan Sifeng (郇斯枫), who is also a center playing for UMBC Retrievers men's basketball.

== Early life ==
Huan was born in Nanjing, Jiangsu, China, on May 8, 2007. He comes from a basketball family. His mother, Ma Chengqing (Chinese: 马澄清), is a former basketball player who represented the China women's national basketball team at the 1996 Summer Olympics. Ma was measured 1.94m (6 ft 4 in) tall.

Huan and his twin brother began playing basketball at the age of six. He attended Tsinghua University High School before moving to the United States through the Joe Tsai Basketball Scholarship program in 2022.

For his freshman season, Huan attended Windermere High School in Florida. He appeared in 32 games and averaged 6.4 points, 5.8 rebounds and 4.7 blocks per game, setting the school record for blocked shots.

Beginning with his sophomore year, Huan transferred to Georgetown Preparatory School in North Bethesda, Maryland. He helped Georgetown Prep win the Interstate Athletic Conference championship and complete the first undefeated regular season and tournament championship campaign in school history.

He averaged 18.8 points, 8.7 rebounds, 3.5 blocks and 2.1 assists per game and was named Interstate Athletic Conference Player of the Year.

Before the conclusion of his senior season, Huan received scholarship offers from Purdue University, University of Alabama, Creighton University, University of Florida, Mississippi State University and University of Illinois Urbana–Champaign.

On March 27, 2026, Huan was selected to represent the World Team at the Nike Hoop Summit and started the game.

== Recruiting ==
College recruiting
Name	Hometown	School	Height	Weight	Commit date
Sinan Huan; C	Rockville, MD	Georgetown Prep	7 ft 0 in (2.13 m)	225 lb (102 kg)	Nov 12, 2025
Sinan Huan; C	Recruit ratings: Rivals: 247Sports: ESPN: (84)				
Overall recruit ranking: Rivals: 69 247Sports: 65 ESPN: 71
Note: In many cases, Scout, Rivals, 247Sports, On3, and ESPN may conflict in their listings of height and weight.; In these cases, the average was taken. ESPN grades are on a 100-point scale.; Sources: "Sinan Huan at ESPN.com". ESPN.; "2026 Team Ranking". Rivals.

== College career ==
On November 12, 2025, Huan committed to Purdue University, becoming a member of the Purdue Boilermakers men's basketball program beginning with the 2026–27 season.

== National team career ==
Huan represented China at the 2023 FIBA U16 Asia Cup. He averaged 10.3 points, 7.4 rebounds and 4.7 blocks per game, helping China win the bronze medal. He led the tournament in blocked shots.

In 2024, Huan was selected to the China men's national under-17 basketball team for the 2024 FIBA Under-17 Basketball World Cup. During the tournament, he averaged 13.7 points, 6.8 rebounds and 3.8 blocks in 20.7 minutes per game, finishing as the tournament leader in blocks for the second consecutive year. Later that year, despite being eligible for the younger age group, he also represented China at the 2024 FIBA U18 Asia Cup. He averaged 5.2 points, 5.8 rebounds and 2.2 blocks in 15.5 minutes per game, helping China win the bronze medal.

In 2025, Huan was selected to the China men's national under-19 basketball team for the 2025 FIBA Under-19 Basketball World Cup. He emerged as a regular starter, starting all seven games and averaging 11.3 points, 4.7 rebounds and 5.0 blocks in 25.0 minutes per game. Huan once again led the tournament in blocks. His average of 5.0 blocks per game ranked as the third-highest mark in tournament history, trailing only France's Victor Wembanyama, who averaged 5.7 blocks at the 2021 FIBA Under-19 Basketball World Cup, and fellow Chinese player Zhou Qi, who averaged 5.1 blocks at the 2013 FIBA Under-19 Basketball World Cup.
