= Zhang Boyuan =

Chinese basketball player (born 2007)

Zhang Boyuan 张博源
No. 6 – Louisville Cardinals
- Position: Small forward
- League: Atlantic Coast Conference

Personal information
- Born: January 22, 2007 (age 19) Changchun, Jilin, China
- Listed height: 6 ft 9 in (2.06 m)
- Listed weight: 220 lb (100 kg)

Career information
- High school: Jilin Experimental (Changchun, China); Veritas Academy (Garden Grove, California)
- College: Louisville (2026–present)

Career highlights
- Nike Hoop Summit (2025)
Medals
Men's basketball
Representing China
FIBA U18 Asia Cup
Bronze medal – third place	2024 Amman
FIBA U16 Asia Cup
Bronze medal – third place	2023 Doha

Zhang Boyuan (Chinese: 张博源; born January 22, 2007), is a Chinese college basketball player for the Louisville Cardinals of the Atlantic Coast Conference (ACC).

A Chinese youth international, Zhang has represented his country at the U16, U17, U18 and U19 levels.

== Early life ==
Zhang Boyuan was born on January 22, 2007, in Changchun, China. Zhang attended the Changchun Amateur Youth Sports School (CAYSS) and represented CAYSS in the Chinese Junior High School Basketball League. During the 2020 season, he started seven games in the group stage and four games in the knockout stage. In the 2021–22 Chinese Junior High School Basketball League season, he appeared in 12 games across the group and knockout stages.

In 2023, Zhang competed for CAYSS in the 2023 Chinese U17 National Youth League, averaging 26.1 points and 6.8 rebounds per game.

For high school, Zhang attended Jilin Experimental High School, where he competed in China High School Basketball League (CHBL). He also joined the youth system of the Shanxi Loongs and participated in the Chinese U21 National Youth League. During both his 10th-grade (2023–24) and 11th-grade (2024–25) seasons, (Note: In Secondary Schools in China, there are 3 years in junior high schools and 3 in high schools) he averaged at least 20 points and five rebounds per game.

Rather than signing a professional contract with the Shanxi Loongs and entering the Chinese Basketball Association (CBA) upon turning 18, Zhang chose to move to the United States and enroll at Veritas Academy in California, to further his pursuit of a professional career at a higher level. Competing in the Nike Elite Youth Basketball League (EYBL) during the 2025–26 season, he averaged 20.2 points per game.

According to recruiting service 247Sports, Zhang was rated a four-star recruit in the class of 2026 and ranked among the top 60 prospects nationally, including among the top small forwards in his class.

College recruiting
Name	Hometown	School	Height	Weight	Commit date
Boyuan Zhang; SF	Garden Grove, Calif.	Veritas Prep.	6 ft 8 in (2.03 m)	205 lb (93 kg)	May 11, 2026
Boyuan Zhang; SF	Recruit ratings: Rivals: 247Sports: ESPN: (87)				
Overall recruit ranking: Rivals: 46, 15 (SF) 247Sports: 53, 21 (SF) ESPN: 51, 18 (SF)
Note: In many cases, Scout, Rivals, 247Sports, On3, and ESPN may conflict in their listings of height and weight.; In these cases, the average was taken. ESPN grades are on a 100-point scale.; Sources: "2026 Louisville Basketball Team Recruiting Prospects". ESPN.; "2026 Team Ranking". Rivals.

== College career ==
On May 11, 2026, Zhang committed to play college basketball for the Louisville Cardinals of the University of Louisville.

== International career ==
In 2023, Zhang was selected to the China men's national under-16 basketball team for the 2023 FIBA U16 Asian Championship. He averaged 20.5 points and 5.0 rebounds per game and helped China win the bronze medal.

In 2024, Zhang represented China at the 2024 FIBA Under-17 Basketball World Cup. In a group-stage victory over France, he recorded 18 points and eight rebounds as China defeated France 73–70. Later that year, Zhang competed at the 2024 FIBA Under-18 Asia Cup, helping China capture the bronze medal. He averaged 17.2 points, 2.8 rebounds and 1.3 assists per game and was named to the All-Tournament Team.

In March 2025, Zhang was selected to the World Team roster for the 2025 Nike Hoop Summit, becoming one of the Chinese players invited to the event.

In April 2025, Zhang was named to the China men's national under-19 basketball team. Two months later, he was selected to China's final 12-man roster for the 2025 FIBA Under-19 Basketball World Cup.
