= Arafan Diané =

Guinean basketball player (born 2007)

No. 14 – Houston Cougars
- Position: Center
- League: Big 12 Conference

Personal information
- Born: 19 November 2007 (age 18) Conakry, Guinea
- Listed height: 7 ft 0 in (2.13 m)
- Listed weight: 280 lb (127 kg)

Career information
- High school: Dynastie Prep (Montreal, Quebec, Canada); Iowa United Prep (Des Moines, Iowa, U.S.)
- College: Houston (2026–present)

Career highlights
- McDonald's All-American (2026); Jordan Brand Classic (2026); Nike Hoop Summit (2026)
Medals
Men's basketball
Representing Guinea
FIBA U16 African Championship
Gold medal – first place	2023 Tunisia	Team

Arafan Diané (born 19 November 2007) is a Guinean college basketball player for the Houston Cougars of the Big 12 Conference.

== Early life ==
Diané is from Conakry, Guinea. At age 12, while looking for a football at a local market, he met basketball coach Souleymane Kassé, who saw his potential and suggested he buy a basketball instead after noticing his long limbs. He trained with Kassé for a year before he was recommended to Alex Victor, who ran Dynastie Prep, a prep basketball program in Montreal, Canada. "[Kassé] called us up and he was like, ‘The kid needs to leave. He’s getting better too quick. I really think he needs to leave as soon as possible," recalled Victor. Due to the 2021 military coup, Diané was initially unable to fly out of the country alone. On his 14th birthday, nearly two years later, he took a flight to Canada.

Diané played at Dynastie Prep in Montreal from 2021 to 2024, initially competing on the MADE Hoops circuit against top prospects like AJ Dybantsa before being moved up to the varsity team the following year. Ahead of his junior season, he transferred to Iowa United Prep in Des Moines, Iowa, a year-round program that played in both high school basketball and the Amateur Athletic Union (AAU) circuit. Diané had a strong showing at the 2025 NBPA Top100 Camp in Rock Hill, South Carolina, where he averaged 13.3 points and 4.9 rebounds per game. That summer, he also earned first-team all-Adidas 3SSSB circuit honors after averaging 16.9 points and a circuit-leading 10.8 rebounds per game. As a senior in 2025–26, Diané led Iowa United during its first season in the Nike EYBL Scholastic conference. He averaged 12 points and a conference-leading 10.2 rebounds per game. Diané was named a first-team All-American by The Sporting News. He was also selected to play in the 2026 McDonald's All-American Game on the West team.

Diané is a consensus four-star recruit, according to major recruiting services. He reduced the list of his college offers down to his top 12 choices in August 2025. The following month, Diané narrowed it down to his top five choices: Arkansas, Houston, Indiana, Kentucky, and Virginia. After taking official visits to all five finalists, he committed to playing college basketball for the Houston Cougars under head coach Kelvin Sampson on 19 November 2025, which was also his 18th birthday.

== National team career ==
Diané captained Guinea at the 2023 FIBA U16 African Championship. He helped the team win its first African championship title (at any level), posting 14 points and 11 rebounds in an 84–76 upset win in the final over five-time tournament winners Egypt. Diané averaged 17.4 points and a tournament-leading 17.3 rebounds per game, registering seven double-doubles in as many games, and subsequently earned tournament All-Star Five honors. Standing at 2.03 m (6 ft 8 in), he was dubbed "Baby Shaq" by FIBA.com.

The following year, Diané represented Guinea at the 2024 FIBA Under-17 World Cup. He averaged 19.1 points and a tournament-leading 11.7 rebounds per game, posting six double-doubles in seven games.

== Personal life ==
Diané speaks six languages, including English and French.
