= Dash Daniels =

Australian basketball player (born 2007)

No. 4 – South East Melbourne Phoenix
- Position: Shooting guard
- League: NBL

Personal information
- Born: 18 December 2007 (age 18)
- Listed height: 196 cm (6 ft 5 in)
- Listed weight: 90 kg (198 lb)

Career information
- Playing career: 2024–present

Career history
- 2024: BA Centre of Excellence
- 2025–2026: Melbourne United
- 2025: Sandringham Sabres
- 2026–present: South East Melbourne Phoenix
Medals
Men's basketball
Representing Australia
FIBA Asia Cup
Gold medal – first place	2025 Saudi Arabia

Dash Daniels (born 18 December 2007) is an Australian professional basketball player for the South East Melbourne Phoenix of the National Basketball League (NBL). In 2025, Daniels joined Melbourne United as an NBL Next Star. The following year, he continued his Next Star status at the South East Melbourne Phoenix.

== Early life ==
Daniels was born on 18 December 2007. He is the younger brother of NBA player Dyson Daniels. He grew up playing basketball like his brother, training at the Hoop City facility owned by Melbourne United in Cheltenham. He was selected player of the tournament at Australia's 2024 U18 national championships.

Similar to his brother, Daniels was developed by the NBA Global Academy. He was one of 11 players invited to the 2024 NBA Academy Games and also was named the top defensive player at the Basketball Without Borders camp in 2025.

Alongside the NBA Global Academy, Daniels played for the BA Centre of Excellence in the NBL1 East during the 2024 NBL1 season. In 10 games, he averaged 5.0 points, 3.7 rebounds and 1.3 assists per game.

== Professional career ==
Daniels had offers to play college basketball for top programs in the U.S., but declined in order to stay in Australia. In December 2024, at age 16, he signed with Melbourne United of the Australian National Basketball League (NBL), becoming one of the league's youngest players ever. He signed as an NBL Next Star for the 2025–26 season, but joined the team in January 2025 for the rest of the 2024–25 season as a training player.

Daniels joined the Sandringham Sabres of the NBL1 South during the 2025 NBL1 season. In eight games, he averaged 15.13 points, 3.5 rebounds, 1.88 assists and 2.0 steals per game.

In the 2025–26 NBL season, Daniels appeared in 35 games for Melbourne, including 11 starts. He finished second among United players in three-point percentage, shooting 36 per cent from long range on 1.5 attempts per game. He had a season-best 14-point against the New Zealand Breakers in round 1.

On 15 July 2026, Daniels parted ways with United.

On 17 July 2026, Daniels signed with the South East Melbourne Phoenix as a Next Star for the 2026–27 NBL season. In his debut for the Phoenix on 19 September, he recorded 24 points and 12 rebounds in a 100–79 win over the Perth Wildcats.

== National team career ==
Daniels has played for Australian national teams at various competitions. At age 14, he played six games and helped Australia win the title at the 2023 FIBA Under-16 Asian Championship, while at age 15, he participated at the 2024 FIBA Under-17 Basketball World Cup and was the tournament's leader with 3.6 steals per game.

Daniels was named to the Australian Boomers team for the 2025 FIBA Asia Cup. He played in six games, averaging 7.4 minutes per game and 2.3 points as the Boomers won the gold medal.

In October 2025, Daniels was named in the Boomers squad for the first window of the FIBA Basketball World Cup 2027 Asian Qualifiers. In August 2026, he was named in the squad for two more Asian qualifiers.
