= 2019 FIBA U16 Women's Asian Championship =

(Cancelled)

Tournament details
- Host country: Australia
- City: Canberra
- Dates: 5–10 April 2020
- Teams: 10 (from 1 confederation)
- Venue: 1 (in 1 host city)

The 2019 FIBA U16 Women's Asian Championship was originally to be the FIBA Asia's qualifying tournament for the 2020 FIBA Under-17 Women's Basketball World Cup. The tournament would have been held in Canberra, Australia, from 5 to 10 April 2020. The top four teams would have represented FIBA Asia at the 2020 FIBA Under-17 Women's Basketball World Cup in Romania. However, both Asian Championship and World Cup were cancelled by FIBA due to the COVID-19 pandemic.

== Qualified teams ==
For Division A:

- Semifinalists of the 2017 FIBA U16 Women's Asian Championship:
  - Australia (Hosts)
  - Japan
  - China
  - New Zealand
- 5th-7th Placers of the 2017 FIBA U16 Women's Asian Championship:
  - South Korea
  - Chinese Taipei
  - Thailand
- Division B winners at the 2017 FIBA U16 Women's Asian Championship:
  - India

For Division B:

- 3rd-4th Placers of the 2018 FIBA Under-15 Women's Oceania Championship:
  - Samoa
  - Fiji
- Six (6) teams from FIBA Asia on a first-come first-registered basis, eventually were left unnamed.
