= Hong Kong women's national under-16 basketball team =

Hong Kong
- Joined FIBA: 1957
- FIBA zone: FIBA Asia
- National federation: Basketball Association of Hong Kong, China

U17 World Cup
- Appearances: None

U16 Asia Cup
- Appearances: 5
- Medals: None

U16 Asia Cup Division B
- Appearances: 2
- Medals: None

First international
- China 137–28 Hong Kong (Pune, India; 30 November 2009)

Biggest win
- Maldives 19–109 Hong Kong (Amman, Jordan; 13 July 2023)

Biggest defeat
- China 137–28 Hong Kong (Pune, India; 30 November 2009); China 141–32 Hong Kong (Bengaluru, India; 22 October 2017)

The Hong Kong women's national under-16 basketball team is a national basketball team of Hong Kong, administered by the Basketball Association of Hong Kong, China. It represents the region in international under-16 women's basketball competitions.

== FIBA U16 Asia Cup participations ==
Year	Division A	Division B
2009	9th	—N/a
2011	8th	—N/a
2013	9th	—N/a
2015	7th	—N/a
2017	8th	—N/a
2023	—N/a	4th
2025	—N/a	4th

== See also ==
- Hong Kong women's national basketball team
- Hong Kong women's national under-18 basketball team
- Hong Kong men's national under-16 basketball team
