= 2023 FIBA U16 Women's Asian Championship =

International under-16 basketball tournament

7th FIBA Under-16 Women's Asian Basketball Championship

Tournament details
- Host country: Jordan
- City: Amman
- Dates: 10–16 July
- Teams: 17 (from 1 confederation)
- Venue: 1 (in 1 host city)

Final positions
- Champions: Australia (3rd title)
- Runners-up: Japan
- Third place: New Zealand

Official website
- Division A at www.fiba.basketball/history Division B at www.fiba.basketball/history

The 2023 FIBA U16 Women's Asian Championship was an international under-16 girls' basketball tournament that was held from 10 to 16 July 2023 in Amman, Jordan.

The seventh edition of the biennial competition, this was also the FIBA Asia's qualifying tournament for the 2024 FIBA Under-17 Women's Basketball World Cup in Mexico.

== Qualified teams ==
For Division A:

- Semifinalists of the 2022 FIBA U16 Women's Asian Championship:
  - Australia
  - Japan
  - South Korea
  - New Zealand
- Rest of top seven teams from the 2017 FIBA U16 Women's Asian Championship:
  - China
  - Chinese Taipei
  - Thailand
- Division B winners and runners-up at the 2022 FIBA U16 Women's Asian Championship:
  - Samoa
  - Syria

For Division B:

- The host nation:
  - Jordan
- 4th placer of the 2022 FIBA Under-15 Women's Oceania Championship:
  - Guam
- Teams from FIBA Asia on a first-come first-registered basis:
  - Hong Kong
  - Iran
  - Malaysia
  - Maldives
  - Philippines
  - Singapore

Included were the FIBA World Rankings prior to the tournament for all participating teams in each division.

Division A	Division B
Australia (3); China (11); Japan (12); South Korea (25); Chinese Taipei (28); New Zealand (31); Thailand (44); Syria (66); Samoa (70)	Philippines (56); Malaysia (63); Iran (67); Hong Kong (68); Jordan (87); Singapore (88); Guam (97); Maldives (100)

== Division A ==
All times are local (UTC+03:00)

=== Preliminary round ===
==== Group A ====
Pos	Team	Pld	W	L	PF	PA	PD	Pts	Qualification or relegation
1	Australia	4	4	0	401	167	+234	8	Semifinals
2	Chinese Taipei	4	3	1	355	243	+112	7	Semifinals
3	South Korea	4	2	2	329	253	+76	6	Fifth place game
4	Syria	4	1	3	196	342	−146	5	Seventh place game
5	Thailand	4	0	4	134	410	−276	4	Relegated to 2025 Division B

Source: FIBA
Rules for classification: 1) Points; 2) Head-to-head results; 3) Points difference; 4) Points scored.

10 July 2023
09:00

Boxscore

South Korea	91–58	Syria
Scoring by quarter: 15–10, 26–17, 30–14, 20–17
Pts: Hwang H. 21; Rebs: Hwang Y. 10; Asts: Lee W. 9		Pts: Almohammad 25; Rebs: Almohammad 8 Asts: Almohammad 5

Prince Hamzah Stadium, Amman
Referees: Mohammad Taha (JOR), Jennifer Ammoury (LIB), Ng Hwa Loong (MAS)

10 July 2023
11:00

Boxscore

Thailand	28–117	Chinese Taipei
Scoring by quarter: 7–36, 15–37, 3–21, 3–23
Pts: Khamkaew 7 Rebs: Khamkaew 7 Asts: Bangploy 4		Pts: Pan 16; Rebs: Chen 11; Asts: Pan 6

Prince Hamzah Stadium, Amman
Referees: Glenn Cornelio (PHI), Elham Khazneh (JOR), Mahsa Kargari (IRI)

11 July 2023
09:00

Boxscore

Australia	125–20	Thailand
Scoring by quarter: 32–4, 39–2, 32–14, 22–0
Pts: Hall 23; Rebs: Taylor 12; Asts: Perkins 7		Pts: Matanboon 8 Rebs: Bangploy 5 Asts: Khamkaew 2

Prince Hamzah Stadium, Amman
Referees: Jennifer Ammoury (LIB), Mahsa Kargari (IRI), Ho Yuen Mok (HKG)

11 July 2023
11:00

Boxscore

Chinese Taipei	85–81	South Korea
Scoring by quarter: 24–22, 22–21, 16–20, 23–18
Pts: Pan 24; Rebs: Hsu Y. S. 8 Asts: Chen 7		Pts: Lee G. 32; Rebs: Yang 11; Asts: Lee W. 8

Prince Hamzah Stadium, Amman
Referees: Mohammad Taha (JOR), Samaneh Dehghani (IRI), Jin Leong Ong (SGP)

12 July 2023
09:00

Boxscore

Syria	31–102	Chinese Taipei
Scoring by quarter: 14–21, 6–28, 5–31, 6–22
Pts: Al-Mohammad, Sarkis 8 Rebs: Sarkis 10; Asts: Al-Mousannef 4		Pts: Pan 19; Rebs: Peng 13; Asts: Pan, Peng 9

Prince Hamzah Stadium, Amman
Referees: Sergio Kassab (LIB), Samaneh Dehghani (IRI), Hwa Loong Ng (MAS)

12 July 2023
11:00

Boxscore

South Korea	53–71	Australia
Scoring by quarter: 9–20, 13–22, 15–17, 16–12
Pts: Lim 13; Rebs: Yang 8 Asts: Lee W., Hwang H. 6		Pts: Perkins 19; Rebs: Crook 16; Asts: Taylor 5

Prince Hamzah Stadium, Amman
Referees: Ahmad Suleiman Al-Yousef (JOR), Mahsa Kargari (IRI), Ho Yuen Mok (HKG)

13 July 2023
09:00

Boxscore

Australia	102–43	Syria
Scoring by quarter: 30–16, 30–7, 20–9, 22–11
Pts: Hall 24; Rebs: Hodges 10; Asts: Lehmann 6		Pts: Al-Mohammad 14; Rebs: Al-Mousannef, Ghanaimi 5 Asts: Safar 5

Prince Hamzah Stadium, Amman
Referees: Elham Khazneh (JOR), Jin Leong Ong (SGP), Mohanad Jawad Fanharawi (SYR)

13 July 2023
11:00

Boxscore

Thailand	39–104	South Korea
Scoring by quarter: 19–29, 13–28, 3–24, 4–23
Pts: Bangploy, Piampratchayakun 8 Rebs: Matanboon 7 Asts: Matanboon 6		Pts: Lee G. 27; Rebs: Lee G. 16; Asts: Lim 9

Prince Hamzah Stadium, Amman
Referees: Jennifer Ammoury (LIB), Mok Ho Yuen (HKG), Sergio Kassab (LIB)

14 July 2023
09:00

Boxscore

Chinese Taipei	51–103	Australia
Scoring by quarter: 17–33, 10–22, 18–17, 6–31
Pts: Peng 12; Rebs: Peng 10; Asts: Wang 6		Pts: Perkins 25; Rebs: Hodges 12; Asts: Lehmann 9

Prince Hamzah Stadium, Amman
Referees: Taha Al-Hashedi (YEM), Mahsa Kargari (IRI), Jin Leong Ong (SGP)

14 July 2023
11:00

Boxscore

Syria	64–47	Thailand
Scoring by quarter: 14–9, 23–11, 14–14, 13–13
Pts: Al-Mohammad 27; Rebs: Al-Younes 16; Asts: Al-Mousannef 4		Pts: Khamkaew 20; Rebs: Khamkaew 11; Asts: Bangploy 5

Prince Hamzah Stadium, Amman
Referees: Glenn Cornelio (PHI), Jennifer Ammoury (LIB), Ahmad Suleiman Al-Yousef (JOR)

==== Group B ====
Pos	Team	Pld	W	L	PF	PA	PD	Pts	Qualification
1	Japan	3	3	0	251	116	+135	6	Semifinals
2	New Zealand	3	2	1	219	199	+20	5	Semifinals
3	China	3	1	2	211	214	−3	4	Fifth place game
4	Samoa	3	0	3	128	280	−152	3	Seventh place game

Source: FIBA
Rules for classification: 1) Points; 2) Head-to-head results; 3) Points difference; 4) Points scored.

10 July 2023
13:00

Boxscore

Japan	106–28	Samoa
Scoring by quarter: 34–7, 20–6, 31–9, 21–6
Pts: Kanazawa 24; Rebs: Y. Abe, Suzuki 7 Asts: Hamada 8		Pts: L. Hiko 11; Rebs: L. Hiko, Manumaleuga 8 Asts: Reupena 2

Prince Hamzah Stadium, Amman
Referees: Ahmad Suleiman Alyousef (JOR), Samaneh Dehgani (IRI), Sergio Kassab (LIB)

11 July 2023
13:00

Boxscore

New Zealand	44–75	Japan
Scoring by quarter: 13–25, 8–19, 18–14, 5–17
Pts: Flavell 19; Rebs: Hokianga, Mailei 7 Asts: Four players 4		Pts: Kanazawa 19; Rebs: K. Abe, Suzuki 8 Asts: Hamada 4

Prince Hamzah Stadium, Amman
Referees: Glenn Cornelio (PHI), Sergio Kassab (LIB), Ahmad Suleiman Al-Yousef (JOR)

12 July 2023
13:00

Boxscore

Japan	70–44	China
Scoring by quarter: 21–12, 20–15, 13–6, 16–11
Pts: Hamada, Kanazawa 13; Rebs: K. Abe, Y. Abe 7 Asts: Yamada 4		Pts: Du 13; Rebs: Liang 10; Asts: He, Wang 3

Prince Hamzah Stadium, Amman
Referees: Glenn Cornelio (PHI), Mohammad Taha (JOR), Taha Al-Hashedi (YEM)

12 July 2023
15:30

Boxscore

Samoa	51–80	New Zealand
Scoring by quarter: 14–20, 10–21, 15–27, 12–12
Pts: C. Hiko 14; Rebs: L. Hiko 9 Asts: Manumaleuga, Reupena 2		Pts: Hippolite, Nelson 14; Rebs: Douglas-Karauna 8 Asts: Hippolite, Mailei 4

Prince Hamzah Stadium, Amman
Referees: Elham Khazneh (JOR), Anan Daraghma (PLE), Jin Leong Ong (SGP)

13 July 2023
15:30

Boxscore

China	94–49	Samoa
Scoring by quarter: 15–13, 23–13, 26–8, 30–15
Pts: Xie, Zhao 13; Rebs: Liang 7 Asts: Liu 5		Pts: Sione 14; Rebs: L. Hiko 10; Asts: C. Hiko, Reupena 2

Prince Hamzah Stadium, Amman
Referees: Samaneh Dehghani (IRI), Hwa Loong Ng (MAS), Mahsa Kargari (IRI)

14 July 2023
13:00

Boxscore

New Zealand	95–73	China
Scoring by quarter: 26–11, 18–18, 29–24, 22–20
Pts: Hokianga 31; Rebs: Flavell, Parahi 7 Asts: Hokianga 7		Pts: Wang J. 20; Rebs: Liu 10; Asts: Huang, Zhang 3

Prince Hamzah Stadium, Amman
Referees: Wissam Zein (SYR), Mohammad Taha (JOR), Sergio Kassab (LIB)

=== Knockout round ===
==== Bracket ====
Semifinals
15 July
Australia	99
New Zealand	62
15 July
Japan	93
Chinese Taipei	46

Final
16 July
Australia	80
Japan	74
Third place game
16 June
New Zealand	66
Chinese Taipei	63

==== Semifinals ====
15 July 2023
11:00

Boxscore

Australia	99–62	New Zealand
Scoring by quarter: 26–11, 25–18, 25–20, 23–13
Pts: Somfai 24; Rebs: Crook 12; Asts: Perkins 7		Pts: Douglas-Karauna 13; Rebs: Hickey 5 Asts: Hokianga 4

Prince Hamzah Stadium, Amman
Referees: Glenn Cornelio (PHI), Elham Khazneh (JOR), Anan Daraghma (PLE)

15 July 2023
13:00

Boxscore

Japan	93–46	Chinese Taipei
Scoring by quarter: 22–10, 25–15, 23–12, 23–9
Pts: K. Abe 20; Rebs: Three players 7 Asts: Yamada 7		Pts: Lin 13; Rebs: Wang 8 Asts: Pan 4

Prince Hamzah Stadium, Amman
Referees: Ahmad Suleiman Al-Yousef (JOR), Jennifer Ammoury (LIB), Taha Al-Hashedi (YEM)

==== Seventh place game ====
15 July 2023
09:00

Boxscore

Syria	50–72	Samoa
Scoring by quarter: 12–17, 14–12, 17–20, 7–23
Pts: Al-Mohammad 22; Rebs: Al-Mohammad, Ghanaimi 9 Asts: Al-Mohammad 5		Pts: Manumaleuga 22; Rebs: Reupena 15; Asts: L. Hiko, Reupena 5

Prince Hamzah Stadium, Amman
Referees: Sergio Kassab (LIB), Mok Ho Yuen (HKG), Hwa Loong Ng (MAS)

==== Fifth place game ====
16 July 2023
09:00

Boxscore

South Korea	84–63	China
Scoring by quarter: 24–24, 20–13, 16–7, 24–19
Pts: Lee G. 36; Rebs: Jung 12; Asts: Lim 10		Pts: Huang 18; Rebs: Liang 12; Asts: Wang H. 5

Prince Hamzah Stadium, Amman
Referees: Ahmad Suleiman Al-Yousef (JOR), Sasha Nicholson (NZL), Jennifer Ammoury (LIB)

==== Third place game ====
16 July 2023
11:00

Boxscore

New Zealand	66–63	Chinese Taipei
Scoring by quarter: 18–16, 21–8, 7–14, 20–25
Pts: Flavell 16; Rebs: Flavell 12; Asts: Hokianga 6		Pts: Hsu Y. T., Peng 15; Rebs: Peng 9 Asts: Peng 6

Prince Hamzah Stadium, Amman
Referees: Taha Al-Hashedi (YEM), Samaneh Dehghani (IRI), Sergio Kassab (LIB)

==== Final ====
16 July 2023
13:00

Boxscore

Australia	80–74	Japan
Scoring by quarter: 18–19, 19–20, 17–13, 26–22
Pts: Hall 21; Rebs: Perkins 7 Asts: Perkins 5		Pts: K. Abe 22; Rebs: K. Abe 7 Asts: Hamada 8

Prince Hamzah Stadium, Amman
Referees: Glenn Cornelio (PHI), Hu Jing (CHN), Mohammad Taha (JOR)

== Division B ==
All times are local (UTC+03:00)

=== Preliminary round ===
==== Group A ====
Pos	Team	Pld	W	L	PF	PA	PD	Pts	Qualification
1	Philippines	3	3	0	329	120	+209	6	Semifinals
2	Hong Kong	3	2	1	216	162	+54	5	Semifinals
3	Jordan (H)	3	1	2	216	205	+11	4	Fifth place game
4	Maldives	3	0	3	73	347	−274	3	Seventh place game

Source: FIBA
Rules for classification: 1) Points; 2) Head-to-head results; 3) Points difference; 4) Points scored.
(H) Hosts

10 July 2023
17:30

Boxscore

Philippines	79–40	Hong Kong
Scoring by quarter: 17–11, 20–9, 21–8, 21–12
Pts: Fajardo 17; Rebs: De La O 12; Asts: Arnaldo 6		Pts: Kam 14; Rebs: Mak 11; Asts: Mak 4

Prince Hamzah Stadium, Amman
Referees: Wissam Zein (SYR), Kim Ga-in (KOR), Taha Al-Hashedi (YEM)

10 July 2023
19:30

Boxscore

Jordan	94–32	Maldives
Scoring by quarter: 24–11, 23–4, 22–13, 25–4
Pts: H. Alkarain 18; Rebs: Najjar 10; Asts: Bouri, Sammar 4		Pts: Shirhan 12; Rebs: Firash 5 Asts: Three players 1

Prince Hamzah Stadium, Amman
Referees: Sasha Nicholson (NZL), Anan Daraghma (PLE), Madison Crowley-Long (AUS)

11 July 2023
15:30

Boxscore

Philippines	144–22	Maldives
Scoring by quarter: 41–5, 29–6, 31–4, 43–7
Pts: Canindo 21; Rebs: De La O 12; Asts: Arnaldo 7		Pts: Shirhan 11; Rebs: Nimal 9 Asts: Three players 1

Prince Hamzah Stadium, Amman
Referees: Madison Crowley-Long (AUS), Via Diah Rohmana (INA), Mohanad Jawad Fanharawi (IRQ)

11 July 2023
19:30

Boxscore

Hong Kong	67–64	Jordan
Scoring by quarter: 16–16, 14–21, 24–13, 13–14
Pts: Kam 22; Rebs: Yan 16; Asts: Ka 8		Pts: Z. Alkarain 27; Rebs: H. Alkarain 10; Asts: Z. Alkarain 6

Prince Hamzah Stadium, Amman
Referees: Taha Al-Hashedi (YEM), Kim Ga-in (KOR), Shigeyuki Arisawa (JPN)

12 July 2023
19:30

Boxscore

Jordan	58–106	Philippines
Scoring by quarter: 19–26, 14–30, 16–23, 9–27
Pts: Z. Alkarain 26; Rebs: Z. Alkarain 7 Asts: H. Alkarain 2		Pts: Sayson 19; Rebs: Canindo, Palma 8 Asts: Nair 7

Prince Hamzah Stadium, Amman
Referees: Hu Jing (CHN), Wissam Zein (SYR), Sasha Nicholson (NZL)

13 July 2023
13:00

Boxscore

Maldives	19–109	Hong Kong
Scoring by quarter: 8–31, 7–25, 4–26, 0–27
Pts: Shirhan 7 Rebs: Nimal 8 Asts: Nimal, Shameem 2		Pts: Lo 19; Rebs: Mak 14; Asts: Lo 7

Prince Hamzah Stadium, Amman
Referees: Madison Crowley-Long (AUS), Via Diah Rohmana (INA), Shigeyuki Arisawa (JPN)

==== Group B ====
Pos	Team	Pld	W	L	PF	PA	PD	Pts	Qualification
1	Iran	3	3	0	229	181	+48	6	Semifinals
2	Malaysia	3	2	1	212	184	+28	5	Semifinals
3	Singapore	3	1	2	187	216	−29	4	Fifth place game
4	Guam	3	0	3	155	202	−47	3	Seventh place game

Source: FIBA
Rules for classification: 1) Points; 2) Head-to-head results; 3) Points difference; 4) Points scored.

10 July 2023
15:30

Boxscore

Malaysia	74–80	Iran
Scoring by quarter: 14–18, 15–26, 21–18, 24–18
Pts: Lee K. 20; Rebs: Oh 9 Asts: Ang 6		Pts: Zamani Dehyaghoubi, Zarei 17; Rebs: Houdneh, Dehyaghoubi 11; Asts: Zarei 11

Prince Hamzah Stadium, Amman
Referees: Hu Jing (CHN), Shigeyuki Arisawa (JPN), Chitchanok Srisawat (THA)

11 July 2023
17:30

Boxscore

Singapore	71–60	Guam
Scoring by quarter: 22–15, 18–16, 19–12, 12–17
Pts: Yeoh 16; Rebs: Yeoh 13; Asts: Lock 6		Pts: Peters 21; Rebs: Peters 12; Asts: Peters 4

Prince Hamzah Stadium, Amman
Referees: Anan Daraghma (PLE), Hu Jing (CHN), Huanhg Yun-Hsuan (TPE)

12 July 2023
11:00

Boxscore

Malaysia	66–53	Guam
Scoring by quarter: 19–10, 14–9, 16–22, 17–12
Pts: Yap 15; Rebs: Oh 13; Asts: Ang, Yap 3		Pts: Ada, Paulino 13; Rebs: Peters 14; Asts: Ada, Peters 3

Prince Hamzah Stadium, Amman
Referees: Chitchanok Srisawat (THA), Mohanad Jawad Fanharawi (IRQ), Huang Yun-Hsuan (TPE)

12 July 2023
17:30

Boxscore

Iran	84–65	Singapore
Scoring by quarter: 24–10, 14–16, 23–14, 23–25
Pts: Houdneh 21; Rebs: Houdneh 22; Asts: Zarei 15		Pts: Lock 18; Rebs: Toe 9 Asts: Lock 6

Prince Hamzah Stadium, Amman
Referees: Shigeyuki Arisawa (JPN), Kim Ga-in (KOR), Via Diah Rohmana (INA)

13 July 2023
17:30

Boxscore

Singapore	51–72	Malaysia
Scoring by quarter: 10–17, 9–15, 14–25, 18–15
Pts: T. Lau 14; Rebs: Kong, Toe 6 Asts: Lock 4		Pts: Yap 16; Rebs: Yap 14; Asts: Yap 4

Prince Hamzah Stadium, Amman
Referees: Kim Ga-in (KOR), Sasha Nicholson (NZL), Huang Yun-Hsuan (TPE)

13 July 2023
19:30

Boxscore

Guam	42–65	Iran
Scoring by quarter: 16–17, 10–20, 9–14, 7–14
Pts: Peters 9 Rebs: Brub 9 Asts: Paulino, Peters 3		Pts: Zamani Dehyaghoubi 19; Rebs: Dehyaghoubi 10; Asts: Zarei 9

Prince Hamzah Stadium, Amman
Referees: Hu Jing (CHN), Taha Al-Hashedi (YEM), Chitchanok Srisawat (THA)

=== Knockout round ===
==== Bracket ====
Semifinals
15 July
Philippines	79
Malaysia	44
15 July
Iran	64
Hong Kong	58

Final
16 July
Philippines	83
Iran	60
Third place game
16 June
Malaysia	52
Hong Kong	46

==== Semifinals ====
15 July 2023
17:30

Boxscore

Philippines	79–44	Malaysia
Scoring by quarter: 15–13, 30–14, 21–8, 13–9
Pts: Fajardo 20; Rebs: De La O, Palma 11; Asts: Arnaldo 6		Pts: Wong 16; Rebs: Yap 9 Asts: Ang 4

Prince Hamzah Stadium, Amman
Referees: Via Diah Rohmana (INA), Mohanad Jawad Fanharawi (IRQ), Hu Jing (CHN)

15 July 2023
19:30

Boxscore

Iran	64–58	Hong Kong
Scoring by quarter: 13–16, 13–12, 20–14, 18–16
Pts: Zamani Dehyaghoubi 18; Rebs: Zamani Dehyaghoubi 23; Asts: Zarei 9		Pts: Lo 17; Rebs: Mak 19; Asts: Kam 5

Prince Hamzah Stadium, Amman
Referees: Sasha Nicholson (NZL), Shigeyuki Arisawa (JPN), Kim Ga-in (KOR)

==== Seventh place game ====
14 July 2023
17:30

Boxscore

Maldives	54–65	Guam
Scoring by quarter: 11–19, 12–17, 11–16, 20–13
Pts: Shirhan 27; Rebs: Nimal 12; Asts: Shameem 3		Pts: Peters 11; Rebs: Guzman, Peters 8 Asts: Three players 3

Prince Hamzah Stadium, Amman
Referees: Huang Yun-Hsuan (TPE), Hu Jing (CHN), Via Diah Rohmana (INA)

==== Fifth place game ====
14 July 2023
19:30

Boxscore

Jordan	62–56	Singapore
Scoring by quarter: 16–17, 10–8, 16–12, 20–19
Pts: Shamieh 20; Rebs: Najjar 11; Asts: Z. Alkarain 5		Pts: T. Lau 20; Rebs: Lock, Yeoh 10; Asts: Toe 4

Prince Hamzah Stadium, Amman
Referees: Anan Daraghma (PLE), Madison Crowley-Long (AUS), Kim Ga-in (KOR)

==== Third place game ====
16 July 2023
17:30

Boxscore

Malaysia	52–46	Hong Kong
Scoring by quarter: 10–15, 7–14, 12–10, 23–7
Pts: Lee 11; Rebs: Ang 11; Asts: Ang, Lee 3		Pts: Mak 15; Rebs: Tai 8 Asts: Three players 2

Prince Hamzah Stadium, Amman
Referees: Mohanad Jawad Fanharawi (IRQ), Chitchanok Srisawat (THA), Elham Khazneh (JOR)

==== Final ====
16 July 2023
19:30

Boxscore

Philippines	83–60	Iran
Scoring by quarter: 19–15, 22–11, 18–19, 24–15
Pts: Smith 21; Rebs: Palma 11; Asts: Fajardo 9		Pts: Houdneh, Jafari 14; Rebs: Houdneh 16; Asts: Bazoobandi 7

Prince Hamzah Stadium, Amman
Referees: Shigeyuki Arisawa (JPN), Kim Ga-in (KOR), Anan Daraghma (PLE)

== Final standings ==
Qualified for the 2024 FIBA Under-17 Women's Basketball World Cup
Relegated to Division B of the 2025 FIBA U16 Women's Asia Cup

Rank	Team	Record
1st place, gold medalist(s)	Australia	6–0
2nd place, silver medalist(s)	Japan	4–1
3rd place, bronze medalist(s)	New Zealand	3–2
4	Chinese Taipei	3–3
5	South Korea	3–2
6	China	1–3
7	Samoa	1–3
8	Syria	1–4
9	Thailand	0–4

Promoted to Division A of the 2025 FIBA U16 Women's Asia Cup

Rank	Team	Record
1st place, gold medalist(s)	Philippines	5–0
2nd place, silver medalist(s)	Iran	4–1
3rd place, bronze medalist(s)	Malaysia	3–2
4	Hong Kong	2–3
5	Jordan	2–2
6	Singapore	1–3
7	Guam	1–3
8	Maldives	0–4

== Awards ==
2023 FIBA U16 Women's Asian Champions

Australia
3rd title

The individual awards were announced on 16 July 2023, after the Division A Final.

All-Star Five
Guards	Forwards
(Australia) Ruby Perkins (Japan) An Kanazawa (Chinese Taipei) Peng Yu-Chen	(Australia) Sienna Lehmann (Japan) Kokona Abe
MVP: (Australia) Sienna Lehmann
