= Sri Lanka women's national under-16 basketball team =

National under-16 women's basketball team representing Sri Lanka

Sri Lanka
- Joined FIBA: 1959
- FIBA zone: FIBA Asia
- National federation: Sri Lanka Basketball Federation

U17 World Cup
- Appearances: None

U16 Asia Cup
- Appearances: 3
- Medals: None

U16 Asia Cup Division B
- Appearances: 1
- Medals: None

First international
- Japan 120–9 Sri Lanka; 2009 FIBA Asia Under-16 Championship for Women (Pune, India; 30 November 2009)

The Sri Lanka women's national under-16 basketball team is a national basketball team of Sri Lanka, administered by the Sri Lanka Basketball Federation. It represents the country in international under-16 women's basketball competitions.

== FIBA U16 Asia Cup participations ==
Year	Division A	Division B
2009	12th	—N/a
2011	10th	—N/a
2013	12th	—N/a
2017	—N/a	5th

== Current roster (2017) ==
Sri Lanka roster at the 5th FIBA Under-16 Women's Asian Championship:

Sri Lanka Women's National Under-16 Basketball Team roster
Players
Coaches

Pos.	No.	Name	Age – Date of birth	Height	Club
SF	4	Gnei Hazeena Abdul	16 – March 29, 2001	1.64 m (5 ft 5 in)
C	5	Shyni Meagana Hettiarachchi	15 – November 19, 2001	1.77 m (5 ft 10 in)
F	6	Buthsarani Tharindya Ilangathilaka Ilangathilaka Mudiyanelage	16 – July 5, 2001	1.67 m (5 ft 6 in)
PG	7	Madawala Liyanage Shayami Perera	15 – March 5, 2002	1.67 m (5 ft 6 in)
PG	8	Rashmi Taniya Perera Sri Wickramage Don	16 – February 21, 2001	1.66 m (5 ft 5 in)
PG	9	Induruwa Manudi Thisaka Pathirana	16 – January 28, 2001	1.61 m (5 ft 3 in)
C	10	Ravini Sashrika Punchi Rewage	16 – April 30, 2001	1.77 m (5 ft 10 in)
F	11	Thisari Hiniduma Kapuge	15 – July 4, 2002	1.73 m (5 ft 8 in)
PG	12	Hansini Sahani Maleesha Ruppegoda Gamage	16 – May 15, 2001	1.60 m (5 ft 3 in)
SF	13	Asha Nisma Sheik Amildeen	16 – May 24, 2001	1.67 m (5 ft 6 in)
C	14	Liyaara Malmi Hettiarachchi	16 – August 20, 2001	1.76 m (5 ft 9 in)
SF	15	Leia Hamza	15 – December 23, 2001	1.64 m (5 ft 5 in)

Head coach

- (Sri Lanka) Sivashakthi Selvaraja

Legend

- Age – describes age
  on October 22, 2017

== See also ==
- Sri Lanka women's national basketball team
- Sri Lanka women's national under-18 basketball team
