= Kazakhstan women's national under-16 basketball team =

Kazakhstan
- Joined FIBA: 1992
- FIBA zone: FIBA Asia
- National federation: Kazakhstan Basketball Federation

U17 World Cup
- Appearances: None

U16 Asia Cup
- Appearances: 3
- Medals: None

U16 Asia Cup Division B
- Appearances: 2
- Medals: (bronze) Bronze: 1 (2017)

First international
- Malaysia 78–54 Kazakhstan; 2009 FIBA Asia Under-16 Championship for Women (Pune, India; 30 November 2009)

The Kazakhstan women's national under-16 basketball team is a national basketball team of Kazakhstan, administered by the Kazakhstan Basketball Federation. It represents the country in international under-16 women's basketball competitions.

== FIBA U16 Asia Cup record ==
Year	Division A	Division B	P	W	L	PF	PA	PD
2009	10th	—N/a	6	1	5	345	453	–108
2011	Did not participate							
2013	8th	—N/a	6	3	3	379	367	+12
2015	11th	—N/a	5	2	3	310	326	–16
2017	—N/a	3rd place, bronze medalist(s)	5	3	2	336	256	+80
2022	—N/a	6th	5	2	3	267	272	–5
2023	Did not participate							
Total	3/7	2/3	27	11	16	1,637	1,674	–37

== See also ==
- Kazakhstan women's national basketball team
- Kazakhstan women's national under-18 basketball team
- Kazakhstan men's national under-16 basketball team
