= Nepal women's national under-16 basketball team =

Nepal
- FIBA ranking: not ranked as of December 2024
- Joined FIBA: 2000
- FIBA zone: FIBA Asia
- National federation: Nepal Basketball Association
- Coach: Bipin Kapali (2017)

U17 World Cup
- Appearances: None

U16 Asia Cup
- Appearances: None

U16 Asia Cup Division B
- Appearances: 1 (2017)
- Medals: None

First international
- India 106–37 Nepal; 2017 FIBA Under-16 Women's Asian Championship (Bangalore, India; 22 October 2017)

The Nepal women's national under-16 basketball team is a national basketball team of Nepal, administered by the Nepal Basketball Association. It represents the country in international under-16 women's basketball competitions.

== FIBA U16 Asia Cup ==
So far, the team's only participation at the FIBA U16 Women's Asia Cup was during the 2017 FIBA Under-16 Women's Asian Championship in Bangalore, India, wherein they finished sixth in Division B.

== Current roster (2017) ==
Nepal roster at the 5th FIBA Under-16 Women's Asian Championship:

Nepal Women's National Under-17 Basketball Team roster
Players
Coaches

Pos.	No.	Name	Age – Date of birth	Height	Club
C	4	Shreyasi Rana	14 – April 12, 2003	1.78 m (5 ft 10 in)
C	5	Nistha Rajbhandari	14 – March 13, 2003	1.78 m (5 ft 10 in)
PG	6	Nilam Sherpa	15 – March 3, 2002	1.53 m (5 ft 0 in)
SG	7	Mamata Gurung	15 – February 12, 2002	1.60 m (5 ft 3 in)
PF	8	Tshering Sherpa	16 – October 10, 2001	1.63 m (5 ft 4 in)
C	9	Aaditi Choudhary	14 – March 11, 2003	1.82 m (6 ft 0 in)
SG	10	Sushma Gautam	15 – October 8, 2002	1.60 m (5 ft 3 in)
F	11	Pratikshya Magar (c)	15 – March 11, 2002	1.65 m (5 ft 5 in)
SF	12	Roshani Shrestha	14 – January 18, 2003	1.58 m (5 ft 2 in)
SF	13	Erisha Shrestha	16 – February 4, 2001	1.65 m (5 ft 5 in)
SF	14	Sanskriti Maskay	15 – June 6, 2002	1.65 m (5 ft 5 in)
PG	15	Asmita Thapa	15 – April 1, 2002	1.58 m (5 ft 2 in)

Head coach

- (Nepal) Bipin Kapali

Assistant coach(es)

- (Nepal) Sushil Gurung

Legend

- (c) Team captain
- Age – describes age
  on October 22, 2017

== See also ==
- Nepal women's national basketball team
- Nepal men's national under-16 basketball team
