= Huimin =

Huimin may refer to:

== People ==
- Muslims in China (回民)
- Situ Huimin (1910–1987), Chinese film director, screenwriter and actor
- Wang Huimin (born 1992), female Chinese volleyball player
- Yang Huimin (1915–1992), Girl Guide during the 1937 Battle of Shanghai
- Zhang Huimin (born 1999), Chinese girl who completed a 3,550 kilometres run when she was eight years old
- Huimin Zhao, chemical engineering professor at the University of Illinois, Urbana-Champaign

== Places ==
- Huimin County (惠民县), Shandong
- Huimin District (回民区), Hohhot, Inner Mongolia
- Huimin, Lancang County (惠民镇), Lancang Lahu Autonomous County, Yunan
