= Thailand women's national under-16 basketball team =

Thailand
- Joined FIBA: 1953
- FIBA zone: FIBA Asia
- National federation: Basketball Sport Association of Thailand

U17 World Cup
- Appearances: None

U16 Asia Cup
- Appearances: 5
- Medals: None

First international
- South Korea 78–58 Thailand; 2009 FIBA Asia Under-16 Championship for Women (Pune, India; 30 November 2009)

The Thailand women's national under-16 basketball team is a national basketball team of Thailand, administered by the Basketball Sport Association of Thailand. It represents the country in international under-16 women's basketball competitions.

== FIBA U16 Asia Cup participations ==
Year	Result in Division A
2009	5th
2013	7th
2015	5th
2017	7th
2023	9th

== See also ==
- Thailand women's national basketball team
- Thailand women's national under-19 basketball team
- Thailand men's national under-16 basketball team
