= 2015 FIBA Asia Under-16 Championship for Women =

4th FIBA Under-16 Women's Asian Basketball Championship

Tournament details
- Host country: Indonesia
- City: Medan
- Dates: 2–9 August
- Teams: 12 (from 1 confederation)
- Venue: 1 (in 1 host city)

Final positions
- Champions: China (3rd title)
- Runners-up: Japan
- Third place: South Korea

Tournament statistics
- Top scorer: (China) Li Y.R. (22.1)
- Top rebounds: (Uzbekistan) Salavotova (19.2)
- Top assists: (China) Wang J.Q. (4.1)
- PPG (Team): China (87.4)
- RPG (Team): China (63.6)
- APG (Team): China (19.6)

Official website
- www.fiba.basketball/history

The 2015 FIBA Asia Under-16 Championship for Women was the qualifying tournament for FIBA Asia at the 2016 FIBA Under-17 World Championship for Women. The tournament was held in Medan, Indonesia from August 2 to 9.

China defeated Japan in the rematch of the last edition's finals, 92–75, en route their third title, while Korea edged Chinese Taipei in the battle for Third Place, 60–52. China, Japan and Korea will represent FIBA Asia at the 2016 FIBA Under-17 World Championship for Women which will be held in Spain.

The championship was divided into two levels: Level I and Level II. The two lowest finishers of Level I met the top two finishers of Level II to determine which teams qualified for the top Level of the 2017 Championship. The losers were relegated to Level II.

== Qualifying ==
- Semifinalists of the 2013 FIBA Asia Under-16 Championship for Women:
  - China
  - Japan
  - South Korea
  - Chinese Taipei
- Qualifying round winners at the 2013 FIBA Asia Under-16 Championship for Women:
  - India
  - Thailand
- Levels:
  - Level I include teams that won in the qualifying round and the semifinalists of the 2013 championship.
  - Level II are the other teams including the host country which ranked ninth in 2013.

== Draw ==
Level I	Level II
China; Japan; South Korea; Chinese Taipei; India; Thailand	Malaysia; Kazakhstan; Indonesia; Hong Kong; Singapore; Uzbekistan

- According to the tournament's website, here are the twelve (12) teams already confirmed their participation for the competition:
  - China
  - Chinese Taipei
  - Hong Kong
  - India
  - Indonesia
  - Japan
  - Kazakhstan
  - South Korea
  - Malaysia
  - Singapore
  - Thailand
  - Uzbekistan

== Preliminary round ==
=== Level I ===
Pos	Team	Pld	W	L	PF	PA	PD	Pts	Qualification
1	China	5	5	0	428	221	+207	10	Advance to final round
2	Japan	5	4	1	453	263	+190	9	Advance to final round
3	South Korea	5	3	2	381	347	+34	8	Advance to final round
4	Chinese Taipei	5	2	3	320	392	−72	7	Advance to final round
5	Thailand	5	1	4	327	427	−100	6	Qualification to qualifying round
6	India	5	0	5	229	488	−259	5	Qualification to qualifying round

Source: FIBA.com
Rules for classification: (1) Tournament points, (2) Head-to-head tournament points, (3) Head-to-head goal average, (4) Overall goal average, (5) Drawing of lots

2 August
13:00

Report

India	52–97	South Korea
Scoring by quarter: 8–30, 9–17, 18–25, 17–25
Pts: Pawar 13; Rebs: Suren 12; Asts: Masilamani 4		Pts: Lee S.H. 18; Rebs: Park H.J. 11; Asts: Park H.J. 6

Angkasapura Lanud Hall, Medan
Referees: Ferdinand Pascual (PHI), Alexandr Rulyov (KAZ), Yuli Wullandari (INA)

2 August
15:00

Report

Thailand	43–108	Japan
Scoring by quarter: 12–30, 12–20, 14–38, 5–20
Pts: Udomsuk 12; Rebs: Lumdappang, Udomsuk 8 Asts: Summat 3		Pts: Hashiguchi 23; Rebs: Kimura 9 Asts: Kabashima, Kimura 5

Angkasapura Lanud Hall, Medan
Referees: Lim Sok Hoon (MAS), Fong Kin Lun (HKG), Alexey Stepanenko (KAZ)

2 August
17:00

Report

China	93–39	Chinese Taipei
Scoring by quarter: 14–13, 27–2, 28–7, 34–17
Pts: Li Y.R. 16; Rebs: Li Y.R. 21; Asts: Song Y.N., Li S. 3		Pts: Wen S.H. 10; Rebs: Wang T.Y., Wen S.H. 4 Asts: Chen M.H. 5

Angkasapura Lanud Hall, Medan
Referees: Johan Christiana (INA), Liu Chee Khun (MAS), Zhao Jing (SIN)

3 August
13:00

Report

Chinese Taipei	81–70	Thailand
Scoring by quarter: 22–26, 16–18, 18–20, 25–6
Pts: Wen S.H. 16; Rebs: Wu W.J. 9 Asts: Chen M.H. 8		Pts: Lumdappang 30; Rebs: Lumdappang 14; Asts: Lumdappang 4

Angkasapura Lanud Hall, Medan
Referees: Alexandr Rulyov (KAZ), Liu Chee Khun (MAS), Zhao Jing (SIN)

3 August
15:00

Report

Japan	113–39	India
Scoring by quarter: 24–15, 27–10, 25–7, 37–7
Pts: Kajiwara, Hashiguchi 16; Rebs: Takahara 12; Asts: Abe, Kimura 6		Pts: Pawar 12; Rebs: Namarta 7 Asts: Masilamani 5

Angkasapura Lanud Hall, Medan
Referees: Fong Kin Lun (HKG), Johan Christiana (INA), Alexey Stepanenko (KAZ)

3 August
17:00

Report

South Korea	53–78	China
Scoring by quarter: 18–20, 12–13, 5–25, 18–20
Pts: Lee S.H. 10; Rebs: Moon J.Y. 5 Asts: 7 players 1		Pts: Li Y.R. 25; Rebs: Li Y.R. 15; Asts: Wang J.Q. 6

Angkasapura Lanud Hall, Medan
Referees: Ferdinand Pascual (PHI), Lim Sok Hoon (MAS), Yuli Wullandari (INA)

4 August
13:00

Report

Thailand	74–80	South Korea
Scoring by quarter: 19–19, 20–14, 15–29, 20–18
Pts: Udomsuk 18; Rebs: Udomsuk 17; Asts: Summat 4		Pts: Lim Y.S. 25; Rebs: Park H.J., Lee S.H. 8 Asts: Kim M.J. 5

Angkasapura Lanud Hall, Medan
Referees: Yuli Wullandari (INA), Fong Kin Lun (HKG), Zhao Jing (SIN)

4 August
15:00

Report

Chinese Taipei	64–86	Japan
Scoring by quarter: 14–16, 14–26, 15–20, 19–24
Pts: Su C.H. 18; Rebs: Wang T.Y. 12; Asts: Kao Y.L. 2		Pts: Takahara 18; Rebs: Takahara, Hashiguchi 8 Asts: Kasagi 5

Angkasapura Lanud Hall, Medan
Referees: Ferdinand Pascual (PHI), Lim Sok Hoon (MAS), Alexandr Rulyov (KAZ)

4 August
17:00

Report

China	96–32	India
Scoring by quarter: 32–5, 22–11, 29–9, 13–7
Pts: Luo 17; Rebs: Li Y.R. 15; Asts: Song Y.N. 6		Pts: Chakravortty 8 Rebs: Anbazhagan 7 Asts: Masilamani 3

Angkasapura Lanud Hall, Medan
Referees: Alexey Stepanenko (KAZ), Johan Christiana (INA), Liu Chee Khun (MAS)

5 August
13:00

Report

India	58–90	Thailand
Scoring by quarter: 12–11, 12–33, 21–23, 13–23
Pts: Chakravortty 17; Rebs: Chakravortty 13; Asts: Chandahalli 3		Pts: Udomsuk 28; Rebs: Lumdappang 15; Asts: Thongpoon 3

Angkasapura Lanud Hall, Medan
Referees: Johan Christiana (INA), Fong Kin Lun (HKG), Zhao Jing (SIN)

5 August
15:00

Report

South Korea	95–44	Chinese Taipei
Scoring by quarter: 29–7, 19–8, 29–12, 18–17
Pts: Lee S.H. 17; Rebs: Park H.J. 10; Asts: Park I.A., Park H.J., Lim Y.S. 4		Pts: Kao Y.L., Wen S.H. 9 Rebs: Su C.H., Chen Y.T. 5 Asts: Su C.H., Nien S.C. 3

Angkasapura Lanud Hall, Medan
Referees: Lim Sok Hoon (MAS), Alexandr Rulyov (KAZ), Yuli Wullanduri (INA)

5 August
17:00

Report

Japan	47–61	China
Scoring by quarter: 19–19, 13–16, 8–14, 7–12
Pts: Kasagi 16; Rebs: Kasagi 5 Asts: Kasagi 2		Pts: Li Y.R. 26; Rebs: Li Y.R. 22; Asts: Wang J.Q. 5

Angkasapura Lanud Hall, Medan
Referees: Ferdinand Pascual (PHI), Liu Chee Khun (MAS), Alexey Stepanenko (KAZ)

6 August
13:00

Report

Chinese Taipei	92–48	India
Scoring by quarter: 32–12, 23–6, 19–14, 18–16
Pts: Chen M.H. 19; Rebs: Wang T.Y., Wen S.H. 7 Asts: Kao Y.L., Wen S.H. 5		Pts: Chakravortty, Suren 10; Rebs: Suren 16; Asts: Janardhanan 4

Angkasapura Lanud Hall, Medan
Referees: Alexey Stepanenko (KAZ), Liu Chee Khun (MAS), Yuli Wullandari (INA)

6 August
15:00

Report

South Korea	56–99	Japan
Scoring by quarter: 18–26, 11–29, 19–20, 8–24
Pts: Park H.J. 14; Rebs: Park H.J. 12; Asts: Park H.J. 4		Pts: Mineharu 16; Rebs: Fujimoto 10; Asts: Abe 4

Angkasapura Lanud Hall, Medan
Referees: Ferdinand Pascual (PHI), Johan Christiana (INA), Alexandr Rulyov (KAZ)

6 August
17:00

Report

Thailand	50–100	China
Scoring by quarter: 16–27, 11–34, 15–27, 8–12
Pts: Udomsuk 16; Rebs: Udomsuk, Thongpoon 6 Asts: Thongpoon 2		Pts: Li Y.R. 26; Rebs: Liu Y.T. 15; Asts: Li S. 8

Angkasapura Lanud Hall, Medan
Referees: Lim Sok Hoon (MAS), Fong Kin Lun (HKG), Zhao Jing (SIN)

=== Level II ===
Pos	Team	Pld	W	L	PF	PA	PD	Pts	Qualification
1	Hong Kong	5	5	0	342	205	+137	10	Qualification to qualifying round
2	Indonesia (H)	5	3	2	280	240	+40	8 (Note: Indonesia wins head-to-head against Singapore)	Qualification to qualifying round
3	Singapore	5	3	2	274	245	+29	8 (Note: Singapore loses head-to-head against Indonesia)	
4	Malaysia	5	2	3	282	303	−21	7	
5	Kazakhstan	5	2	3	310	326	−16	7	
6	Uzbekistan	5	0	5	206	375	−169	5	

Source: FIBA.com
Rules for classification: (1) Tournament points, (2) Head-to-head tournament points, (3) Head-to-head goal average, (4) Overall goal average, (5) Drawing of lots
(H) Hosts
Notes:

2 August
09:00

Report

Singapore	76–63	Kazakhstan
Scoring by quarter: 21–13, 17–18, 16–10, 22–22
Pts: Chan 27; Rebs: Choo J.Y. 15; Asts: Leong L.Y. 4		Pts: Yevsyukova 15; Rebs: Mubarakova 7 Asts: Baibolekova 4

Angkasapura Lanud Hall, Medan
Referees: Snehal Bendke (IND), Lee Ji-Youn (KOR), Zhang Lei (CHN)

2 August
11:00

Report

Hong Kong	71–32	Malaysia
Scoring by quarter: 17–11, 22–4, 21–6, 11–11
Pts: Lau S.H. 15; Rebs: Shek M.N. 7 Asts: Sham T.C. 5		Pts: Chan Y.V. 9 Rebs: Foo S.Y. 12; Asts: Chong S.R. 3

Angkasapura Lanud Hall, Medan
Referees: Watcharin Padungratchadakit (THA), Jun Horiuchi (JPN), Vaibhav Singh (IND)

2 August
19:30

Report

Uzbekistan	43–86	Indonesia
Scoring by quarter: 15–20, 8–18, 9–18, 11–30
Pts: Ejova, Salavotova 11; Rebs: Salavotova 18; Asts: Pak, Zalametdinova 2		Pts: Aoijs 21; Rebs: Kurniawan 8 Asts: Paguno 4

Angkasapura Lanud Hall, Medan
Referees: Ferdinand Pascual (PHI), Chen Ming-ling (TPE), Zhang Wei (CHN)

3 August
09:00

Report

Malaysia	72–53	Uzbekistan
Scoring by quarter: 19–14, 18–14, 22–13, 13–12
Pts: Chan Y.V. 20; Rebs: Foo S.Y. 10; Asts: Chong S.R. 5		Pts: Salavotova 18; Rebs: Salavotova 21; Asts: Ejova 4

Angkasapura Lanud Hall, Medan
Referees: Jun Horiuchi (JPN), Chen Ming-ling (TPE), Zhang Wei (CHN)

3 August
11:00

Report

Kazakhstan	50–80	Hong Kong
Scoring by quarter: 10–26, 16–19, 8–15, 16–20
Pts: Saitova 16; Rebs: Baibolekova 9 Asts: Baibolekova 4		Pts: Shek M.N. 16; Rebs: Shek M.N. 8 Asts: Wong H.Y. 4

Angkasapura Lanud Hall, Medan
Referees: Lee Ji-Youn (KOR), Preeda Muongmee (THA), Vaibhav Singh (IND)

3 August
19:00

Report

Indonesia	52–46	Singapore
Scoring by quarter: 15–10, 12–14, 6–9, 19–13
Pts: Nariswari 12; Rebs: Kurniawan, Wongsohardjo 9 Asts: Denaya, Rasali, Paguno 2		Pts: Chan 20; Rebs: Choo J.Y. 12; Asts: Leong L.Y., Chan, Ng 1

Angkasapura Lanud Hall, Medan
Referees: Snehal Bendke (IND), Watcharin Padungratchadakit (THA), Zhang Lei (CHN)

4 August
09:00

Report

Uzbekistan	38–69	Kazakhstan
Scoring by quarter: 8–21, 4–21, 10–13, 16–14
Pts: Abdumovlonova 11; Rebs: Salavotova 12; Asts: Ejova 3		Pts: Baibolekova 24; Rebs: Mubarakova 9 Asts: Baibolekova 6

Angkasapura Lanud Hall, Medan
Referees: Zhang Lei (CHN), Jun Horiuchi (JPN), Vaibhav Singh (IND)

4 August
11:00

Report

Hong Kong	49–43	Singapore
Scoring by quarter: 4–10, 15–12, 13–6, 17–15
Pts: C. Wong 17; Rebs: Shek M.N. 9 Asts: Chou K.Y. 4		Pts: Chan 13; Rebs: Choo J.Y. 16; Asts: Ang, Ng 2

Angkasapura Lanud Hall, Medan
Referees: Watcharin Padungratchadakit (THA), Chen Ming-ling (TPE), Lee Ji-Youn (KOR)

4 August
19:00

Report

Malaysia	49–50	Indonesia
Scoring by quarter: 11–17, 8–8, 11–7, 19–18
Pts: Foo S.Y. 19; Rebs: Foo S.Y. 16; Asts: Lim Y.X. 4		Pts: Denaya 13; Rebs: Antonio 11; Asts: Paguno, Hartono 2

Angkasapura Lanud Hall, Medan
Referees: Snehal Bendke (IND), Preeda Muongmee (THA), Zhang Wei (CHN)

5 August
09:00

Report

Singapore	60–39	Uzbekistan
Scoring by quarter: 11–9, 20–6, 18–10, 11–14
Pts: Ang 10; Rebs: Choo J.Y. 10; Asts: Yeo, Ng 3		Pts: Aytpaeva 10; Rebs: Salavotova 21; Asts: Ejova 2

Angkasapura Lanud Hall, Medan
Referees: Watcharin Padungratchadakit (THA), Chen Ming-ling (TPE), Zhang Lei (CHN)

5 August
11:00

Report

Kazakhstan	80–87 (OT)	Malaysia
Scoring by quarter: 25–14, 12–13, 17–27, 19–19, Overtime: 7–14
Pts: Mubarakova 16; Rebs: Mubarakova 13; Asts: Borissova, Saitova 3		Pts: Yap K.S. 25; Rebs: Foo S.Y. 9 Asts: Lim Y.X. 3

Angkasapura Lanud Hall, Medan
Referees: Ferdinand Pascual (PHI), Vaibhav Singh (IND), Zhang Wei (CHN)

5 August
19:00

Report

Indonesia	47–54	Hong Kong
Scoring by quarter: 6–14, 11–15, 16–11, 14–14
Pts: Denaya, Nariswari 13; Rebs: Nariswari 10; Asts: Rasali, Wongsohardjo 3		Pts: Lau S.H. 15; Rebs: Shek M.N. 13; Asts: C. Wong 4

Angkasapura Lanud Hall, Medan
Referees: Snehal Bendke (IND), Jun Horiuchi (JPN), Lee Ji-Youn (KOR)

6 August
09:00

Report

Malaysia	42–49	Singapore
Scoring by quarter: 6–15, 11–10, 17–8, 8–16
Pts: Yap K.S. 14; Rebs: Foo S.Y. 11; Asts: Foo S.Y. 3		Pts: Leong L.Y., Choo J.Y. 12; Rebs: Choo J.Y. 12; Asts: Ang, Choo J.Y., Chan 2

Angkasapura Lanud Hall, Medan
Referees: Lee Ji-Youn (KOR), Chen Ming-ling (TPE), Zhang Lei (CHN)

6 August
11:00

Report

Uzbekistan	33–88	Hong Kong
Scoring by quarter: 12–15, 9–24, 4–17, 8–32
Pts: Salavotova 14; Rebs: Salavotova 24; Asts: Ejova 4		Pts: Sham T.C. 16; Rebs: Ip 7 Asts: Sham T.C. 4

Angkasapura Lanud Hall, Medan
Referees: Snehal Bendke (IND), Jun Horiuchi (JPN), Zhang Wei (CHN)

6 August
19:00

Report

Kazakhstan	48–45	Indonesia
Scoring by quarter: 12–9, 13–7, 8–19, 15–10
Pts: Yevsyukova 15; Rebs: Mubarakova 13; Asts: 5 players 1		Pts: Wongsohardjo 12; Rebs: Nariswari 8 Asts: Wongsohardjo 3

Angkasapura Lanud Hall, Medan
Referees: Ferdinand Pascual (PHI), Watcharin Padungratchadakit (THA), Vaibhav Singh (IND)

== Qualifying round ==
Winners are promoted to Level I of the 2017 FIBA U16 Women's Asian Championship.

8 August
13:00

Report

India	44–66	Hong Kong
Scoring by quarter: 11–15, 11–18, 13–18, 9–15
Pts: Pawar 19; Rebs: Pawar 9 Asts: Masilamani 5		Pts: C. Wong 18; Rebs: Lau S.H. 10; Asts: Lau S.H. 5

Angkasapura Lanud Hall, Medan
Referees: Watcharin Padungratchadakit (THA), Jun Horiuchi (JPN), Lee Ji-Youn (KOR)

8 August
15:00

Report

Thailand	74–60	Indonesia
Scoring by quarter: 17–16, 25–7, 16–9, 16–28
Pts: Saraban 21; Rebs: Lumdappang, Thongpoon 10; Asts: Nusomkaeo 5		Pts: Denaya 11; Rebs: Kurniawan, Nariswari 6 Asts: Wongsohardjo 5

Angkasapura Lanud Hall, Medan
Referees: Lim Sok Hoon (MAS), Fong Kin Lun (HKG), Zhang Lei (CHN)

== Final round ==
Top three teams qualify to the 2016 FIBA Under-17 World Championship for Women.

Semifinals
8 August
China	89
Chinese Taipei	46
8 August
Japan	64
South Korea	55

Final
9 August
China	95
Japan	72
Third place
9 August
Chinese Taipei	52
South Korea	60

=== Semifinals ===
8 August
17:00

Report

China	89–46	Chinese Taipei
Scoring by quarter: 11–9, 29–12, 26–11, 23–14
Pts: Li Y.R. 20; Rebs: Zhang L.G. 11; Asts: Wang M.Q. 5		Pts: Chen M.H. 10; Rebs: Wen S.H. 5 Asts: Kao Y.L., Chen M.H. 2

Angkasapura Lanud Hall, Medan
Referees: Snehal Bendke (IND), Alexey Stepanenko (KAZ), Yuli Wullanduri (INA)

8 August
19:00

Report

Japan	64–55	South Korea
Scoring by quarter: 17–21, 18–6, 16–19, 13–9
Pts: Takahara 14; Rebs: Kasagi 12; Asts: Abe 6		Pts: Lee S.H. 18; Rebs: Park H.J. 16; Asts: Lim Y.S. 2

Angkasapura Lanud Hall, Medan
Referees: Ferdinand Pascual (PHI), Liu Chee Khun (MAS), Alexandr Rulyov (KAZ)

=== Third place game ===
9 August
14:00

Report

Chinese Taipei	52–60	South Korea
Scoring by quarter: 12–14, 12–8, 8–15, 20–23
Pts: Kao Y.L. 13; Rebs: Wang T.Y. 9 Asts: Shiau S.J., Chen M.H. 2		Pts: Park H.J. 18; Rebs: Park H.J. 20; Asts: Park I.A., Park H.J. 4

Angkasapura Lanud Hall, Medan
Referees: Ferdinand Pascual (PHI), Watcharin Padungratchadakit (THA), Yuli Wullanduri (INA)

=== Final ===
9 August
16:00

Report

China	95–72	Japan
Scoring by quarter: 24–23, 22–15, 23–23, 26–11
Pts: Li Y.R. 31; Rebs: Li Y.R. 18; Asts: Li S. 7		Pts: Abe 31; Rebs: Kasagi, Seki 4 Asts: Kasagi 4

Angkasapura Lanud Hall, Medan
Referees: Snehal Bendke (IND), Lee Ji-Youn (KOR), Lim Sok Hoon (MAS)

== Final standing ==
Qualified for the 2016 FIBA Under-17 World Championship for Women

Rank	Team	Record
1st place, gold medalist(s)	China	7–0
2nd place, silver medalist(s)	Japan	5–2
3rd place, bronze medalist(s)	South Korea	4–3
4	Chinese Taipei	2–5
5	Thailand	2–4
6	India	0–6
7	Hong Kong	6–0
8	Indonesia	3–3
9	Singapore	3–2
10	Malaysia	2–3
11	Kazakhstan	2–3
12	Uzbekistan	0–5

== Awards ==
2015 Asian Under-16 champions

China
Third title
