= Singapore women's national under-16 basketball team =

Singapore
- FIBA zone: FIBA Asia
- National federation: Basketball Association of Singapore

U17 World Cup
- Appearances: None

U16 Asia Cup
- Appearances: 3
- Medals: None

U16 Asia Cup Division B
- Appearances: 1
- Medals: None

The Singapore women's national under-16 basketball team is a national basketball team of Singapore, administered by the Basketball Association of Singapore. It represents the country in international under-16 women's basketball competitions.

== FIBA U16 Asia Cup participations ==
Year	Division A	Division B
2009	11th	—N/a
2011	9th	—N/a
2015	9th	—N/a
2023	—N/a	6th

== See also ==
- Singapore women's national basketball team
- Singapore women's national under-18 basketball team
- Singapore men's national under-16 basketball team
