= South Korea women's national under-17 basketball team =

South Korea
- Joined FIBA: 1947
- FIBA zone: FIBA Asia
- National federation: Korea Basketball Association
- Coach: Lee Sang-hoon

U17 World Cup
- Appearances: 4
- Medals: None

U16 Asia Cup
- Appearances: 7
- Medals: (silver) Silver: 1 (2011); (bronze) Bronze: 3 (2013, 2015, 2022)

First international
- South Korea 78–58 Thailand; 2009 FIBA Asia Under-16 Championship (Pune, India; 30 November 2009)
Medal record
U-16 Asian Championship
Silver medal – second place	2011 Jinan
Bronze medal – third place	2013 Colombo
Bronze medal – third place	2015 Medan
Bronze medal – third place	2022 Amman

The South Korea women's national under-16 and under-17 basketball team is a national basketball team of South Korea, administered by the Korea Basketball Association. It represents the country in international under-16 and under-17 women's basketball competitions.

== FIBA U16 Asia Cup participations ==
Year	Result
2009	4th
2011	2nd place, silver medalist(s)
2013	3rd place, bronze medalist(s)
2015	3rd place, bronze medalist(s)
2017	5th
2022	3rd place, bronze medalist(s)
2023	5th

== FIBA U17 World Cup record ==
Year	Pos.	Pld	W	L
(France) 2010	Did not qualify			
(Netherlands) 2012	9th	7	3	4
(Czech Republic) 2014	10th	7	2	5
(Spain) 2016	15th	6	0	6
(Belarus) 2018	Did not qualify			
(Hungary) 2022	14th	7	1	6
(Mexico) 2024	Did not qualify			
(Czech Republic) 2026	Did not qualify			
(Indonesia) 2028	To be determined			
Total	4/8	27	6	21

== See also ==
- South Korea women's national basketball team
- South Korea women's national under-19 basketball team
- South Korea men's national under-17 basketball team
