= Maldives women's national under-16 basketball team =

Women's basketball team

Maldives
- FIBA ranking: 101 ▼5 (December 2024)
- Joined FIBA: 1997
- FIBA zone: FIBA Asia
- National federation: Maldives Basketball Association

U17 World Cup
- Appearances: None

U16 Asia Cup
- Appearances: None

U16 Asia Cup Division B
- Appearances: 2 (2017, 2023)
- Medals: None

First international
- Maldives 14–130 Malaysia; 2017 FIBA Under-16 Women's Asian Championship (Bangalore, India; 22 October 2017)

Biggest defeat
- Maldives 22–144 Philippines (Amman, Jordan; July 11, 2023)

The Maldives women's national under-16 basketball team is a national basketball team of Maldives, administered by the Maldives Basketball Association. It represents the country in international under-16 women's basketball competitions.

The team participated for the first time during the 2017 FIBA Under-16 Women's Asian Championship in Bangalore, India, wherein they finished seventh in Division B.

== FIBA U16 Asia Cup record ==
Maldives' U16 Women's Asia Cup record
Year	Results in Division B			
Year	Position	Pld	W	L
(India) 2017	7th place	4	0	4
(Jordan) 2022	Did not participate			
(Jordan) 2023	8th place	4	0	4

== Current roster ==
Maldives roster at the 7th FIBA Under-16 Women's Asian Championship:

Maldives Women's National Under-17 Basketball Team roster
Players
Coaches

Pos.	No.	Name	Age – Date of birth	Height	Club
SF	4	Kalsam Nimal	13 – August 25, 2009	1.55 m (5 ft 1 in)	Lioness Sports Club
SF	5	Sarah Zakariyah	13 – January 16, 2010	1.65 m (5 ft 5 in)	Lioness Sports Club
SF	7	Mariyam Sifan	13 – February 11, 2010	1.67 m (5 ft 6 in)	Lioness Sports Club
F	9	Lyra Firash	13 – July 4, 2010	1.75 m (5 ft 9 in)	Lioness Sports Club
SG	10	Mariyam Shirhan	13 – July 25, 2009	1.59 m (5 ft 3 in)	Elite Sports Club
PG	11	Fathmath Shameem	16 – May 24, 2007	1.53 m (5 ft 0 in)	Elite Sports Club
C	12	Fathimath Shujau	14 – December 30, 2008	1.72 m (5 ft 8 in)	Lioness Sports Club
SG	13	Ana Simad	14 – June 19, 2009	1.62 m (5 ft 4 in)	Elite Sports Club
F	14	Aminath Thahseen	15 – July 29, 2007	1.69 m (5 ft 7 in)	Lioness Sports Club
SF	15	Aminath Akram	14 – July 14, 2009	1.61 m (5 ft 3 in)	Lioness Sports Club
PG	19	Mariyam Amil	15 – October 25, 2007	1.55 m (5 ft 1 in)	Lioness Sports Club
C	21	Aishath Khuwailid	13 – November 12, 2009	1.73 m (5 ft 8 in)	Lioness Sports Club

Head coach

- (Maldives) Guraish Afrah

Legend

- Age – describes age
  on July 14, 2023

== See also ==
- Maldives men's national basketball team
