= 2017 FIBA U16 Women's Asian Championship =

International youth basketball tournament

5th FIBA Under-16 Women's Asian Basketball Championship

Tournament details
- Host country: India
- City: Bengaluru
- Dates: 22–28 October 2017
- Teams: 15 (from 1 confederation)
- Venue: 2 (in 1 host city)

Final positions
- Champions: Australia (1st title)
- Runners-up: Japan
- Third place: China

Tournament statistics
- Top scorer: (India) Yadav (20.4)
- Top rebounds: (Nepal) Magar (16.0)
- Top assists: (South Korea) Heo Y.U. (7.3)
- PPG (Team): Japan (89.5)
- RPG (Team): Iran (70.5)
- APG (Team): India (23.8)

Official website
- Division A at www.fiba.basketball/history Division B at www.fiba.basketball/history

The 2017 FIBA U16 Women's Asian Championship was the qualifying tournament for FIBA Asia at the 2018 FIBA Under-17 Women's Basketball World Cup. Originally slated to be held at Hyderabad, the tournament venue was moved and held in Bengaluru, India from October 22 to 28.

Australia stormed back from a 13-point deficit in the third quarter to eke out a come-from-behind 61–60 win against Japan in the Finals, notching their first-ever championship in the tournament. Meanwhile, dethroned defending champions China salvaged the bronze medal after dispatching New Zealand, 60–43.

All these teams will represent FIBA Asia at the next year's FIBA U17 Women's World Cup to be held in Belarus.

== Venues ==
Bangalore	Karnataka
Sree Kanteerava Indoor Stadium	2017 FIBA U16 Women's Asian Championship (Karnataka)
Capacity: 4,000	2017 FIBA U16 Women's Asian Championship (Karnataka)
Koramangala Indoor Stadium	2017 FIBA U16 Women's Asian Championship (Karnataka)
Capacity: 2,000	2017 FIBA U16 Women's Asian Championship (Karnataka)

== Qualified teams ==
For Division A:

- Semifinalists of the 2015 FIBA Asia Under-16 Championship for Women:
  - China
  - Chinese Taipei
  - Japan
  - South Korea
- Qualifying round winners at the 2015 FIBA Asia Under-16 Championship for Women:
  - Hong Kong
  - Thailand
- Teams from FIBA Oceania:
  - Australia
  - New Zealand

For Division B:

- The host nation, being relegated to Division B at the previous championship:
  - India
- Early registrants for the Division B slots from FIBA Asia:
  - Iran
  - Kazakhstan
  - Malaysia
  - Maldives
  - Nepal
  - Sri Lanka

== Competition format ==
The tournament composed of two divisions, Division A and Division B.

For each division, during the Group Phase, eight participating teams were divided into two groups (A and B) of four teams each. Each team played all the other teams in its own group (a total of three games for each team), and all four teams in each group advanced to their division's Quarter-finals. A total of twelve games were played in the Group Phase.

During the Final Phase, Quarter-finals games were decided on the ranking of the participating teams in the Group Phase:

- Game 13: 1st A v 4th B
- Game 14: 2nd B v 3rd B
- Game 15: 3rd A v 2nd B
- Game 16: 4th A v 1st B

For Division A, the four winners advanced to the Semi-finals and to the 2018 FIBA Under-17 Women's Basketball World Cup.

Meanwhile, the four losing quarterfinalists went on to play 5th-8th Classification Games wherein the two winners advanced to play 5-6 Classification Game, while the two losers played 7-8 Classification Game

During the Semi-Finals, the four teams played as follows:

- Game 21: Winner of Game 13 v Winner of Game 14
- Game 22: Winner of Game 15 v Winner of Game 16

In determining the Champions and the Third Place winner, the four teams played as follows:

- Game 23: Loser of Game 21 v Loser of Game 22
- Game 24: Winner of Game 21 v Winner of Game 22

For Division B, the Champions will earn the right to be promoted to the next championship, replacing the last-placed (eighth placer) team from Division A.

== Divisions ==
Division A will include teams that won in the 2015 qualifying round and the semifinalists of the previous championship. FIBA Oceania teams Australia and New Zealand will compete in the tournament for the first time and will be placed in the same division.

Division B included the host team, previous championship Level II participants Kazakhstan and Malaysia. Returning participant that was absent two years ago is Sri Lanka. Completing the seven-team Division B were the first-time participants Iran, Nepal and Maldives.

Included were the FIBA World Rankings prior to the draw.

Division A	Division B
Australia (7); China (9); Japan (11); South Korea (15); Chinese Taipei (27); New Zealand (33); Thailand (35); Hong Kong (43)	India (37); Malaysia (39); Kazakhstan (44); Sri Lanka (49); Iran (NR); Maldives (NR); Nepal (NR)

== Division A ==
All times are local (UTC+05:30)

=== Preliminary round ===
==== Group A ====
Pos	Team	Pld	W	L	PF	PA	PD	Pts
1	Australia	3	3	0	232	153	+79	6
2	New Zealand	3	2	1	188	171	+17	5
3	South Korea	3	1	2	184	225	−41	4
4	Chinese Taipei	3	0	3	194	249	−55	3

Source: FIBA
Rules for classification: 1) Points; 2) Head-to-head results; 3) Points difference; 4) Points scored.

22 October 2017
11:00

Boxscore

Australia	61–43	New Zealand
Scoring by quarter: 7–5, 14–7, 20–13, 20–18
Pts: Heal, Palmer, Hollingsworth 10; Rebs: Potter 8 Asts: Amoore, Poa, Emma-Nnopu 3		Pts: Leger-Walker 13; Rebs: Leger-Walker 13; Asts: Lokotui, Leger-Walker 2

Kanteerava Indoor Stadium, Bangalore
Referees: Ricor Buaron (PHI), Gayan Buddhika Kahingala Waduge (SRI), Rakesh Ramalingaiah (IND)

22 October 2017
13:15

Boxscore

South Korea	90–68	Chinese Taipei
Scoring by quarter: 17–16, 17–13, 30–4, 26–35
Pts: Na G.B., Jung Y.R. 14; Rebs: Jung Y.R. 19; Asts: Heo Y.U. 18		Pts: Lin C.J. 17; Rebs: Cheng H.T. 9 Asts: Tseng H.Y. 9

Kanteerava Indoor Stadium, Bangalore
Referees: Budi Marfan (INA), Imran Ali Baig (IND), Alexandr Rulyov (KAZ)

23 October 2017
11:00

Boxscore

New Zealand	74–44	South Korea
Scoring by quarter: 25–13, 22–14, 15–7, 12–10
Pts: Leger-Walker 17; Rebs: Pupuke-Robati 10; Asts: Leger-Walker 6		Pts: Lee D.Y. 10; Rebs: Jung Y.R., Lee H.R. 7 Asts: Na G.B., Choi M.J. 3

Kanteerava Indoor Stadium, Bangalore
Referees: Ricor Buaron (PHI), Snehal Bendke (IND), Alexandr Rulyov (KAZ)

23 October 2017
13:15

Boxscore

Chinese Taipei	60–88	Australia
Scoring by quarter: 15–24, 15–19, 12–24, 18–21
Pts: Lin C.J. 19; Rebs: Cheng H.T. 9 Asts: Li Y.J. 6		Pts: Amoore 18; Rebs: Emma-Nnopu 12; Asts: Melbourne 5

Kanteerava Indoor Stadium, Bangalore
Referees: Imran Ali Baig (IND), Wee Chun Lim (MAS), Budi Marfan (INA)

24 October 2017
11:00

Boxscore

Australia	83–50	South Korea
Scoring by quarter: 20–9, 11–10, 27–13, 25–18
Pts: Palmer 13; Rebs: Emma-Nnopu 12; Asts: Heal, Palmer, Poa 4		Pts: Na G.B. 23; Rebs: Na G.B. 6 Asts: Heo Y.U. 6

Kanteerava Indoor Stadium, Bangalore
Referees: Alexandr Rulyov (KAZ), Imran Ali Baig (IND) Wee Chun Lim (MAS)

24 October 2017
13:15

Boxscore

Chinese Taipei	66–71	New Zealand
Scoring by quarter: 20–13, 9–20, 21–16, 16–22
Pts: Tseng H.Y. 15; Rebs: Ting C.J. 10; Asts: Tseng H.Y. 5		Pts: Leger-Walker 30; Rebs: Pupuke-Robati 20; Asts: Leger-Walker 6

Kanteerava Indoor Stadium, Bangalore
Referees: Yuen Chun Yip (HKG), Fahimeh Alimoradihamedan (IRI), Gayan Buddhika Kahingala Waduge (SRI)

==== Group B ====
Pos	Team	Pld	W	L	PF	PA	PD	Pts
1	Japan	3	3	0	298	126	+172	6
2	China	3	2	1	283	130	+153	5
3	Thailand	3	1	2	158	268	−110	4
4	Hong Kong	3	0	3	132	347	−215	3

Source: FIBA
Rules for classification: 1) Points; 2) Head-to-head results; 3) Points difference; 4) Points scored.

22 October 2017
15:30

Boxscore

Japan	115–37	Thailand
Scoring by quarter: 28–12, 18–10, 38–8, 31–7
Pts: Miura 20; Rebs: Hirashita 9 Asts: Takahashi 6		Pts: Sriharaksa 14; Rebs: Chumjinda 9 Asts: Nonsiri 3

Kanteerava Indoor Stadium, Bangalore
Referees: Snehal Bendke (IND), Kim Jong-Kuk (KOR), Raj Kumar Maharjan (NEP)

22 October 2017
17:45

Boxscore

China	141–32	Hong Kong
Scoring by quarter: 29–7, 27–6, 46–6, 39–13
Pts: Wan J.Y., Liu Y.T. 21; Rebs: Guo M.Y. 15; Asts: Zheng 7		Pts: Law N.W. 11; Rebs: Law N.W. 5 Asts: S. Ho 2

Kanteerava Indoor Stadium, Bangalore
Referees: Lee Ji-Youn (KOR), Nicolas Fernandes (TAH), Lim Wee Chun (MAS)

23 October 2017
15:30

Boxscore

Hong Kong	36–113	Japan
Scoring by quarter: 12–37, 14–32, 10–22, 0–22
Pts: Ho P.Y. 8 Rebs: Lue S.T. 6 Asts: Law N.W. 2		Pts: Hirashita 22; Rebs: Hirashita 9 Asts: Shuto 8

Kanteerava Indoor Stadium, Bangalore
Referees: Kim Jong-Kuk (KOR), Gayan Buddhika Kahingala Waduge (SRI), Rakesh Ramalingaiah (IND)

23 October 2017
17:45

Boxscore

Thailand	28–89	China
Scoring by quarter: 5–23, 6–26, 9–27, 8–13
Pts: Phuekraksa 6 Rebs: 4 players 5 Asts: Sriharaksa, Sirisathaphornsap 1		Pts: Wan J.Y. 12; Rebs: Wan J.Y. 12; Asts: Zheng 8

Kanteerava Indoor Stadium, Bangalore
Referees: Nicolas Fernandes (TAH), Lee Ji-Youn (KOR), Raj Kumar Maharjan (NEP)

24 October 2017
15:30

Boxscore

China	53–70	Japan
Scoring by quarter: 18–20, 16–10, 9–22, 10–18
Pts: Liu Y.T. 20; Rebs: Liu Y.T. 19; Asts: Zheng 4		Pts: Hayashi 12; Rebs: McArthur 10; Asts: Takahashi, Miura 3

Kanteerava Indoor Stadium, Bangalore
Referees: Budi Marfan (INA), Snehal Bendke (IND), Ricor Buaron (PHI)

24 October 2017
17:45

Boxscore

Thailand	93–64	Hong Kong
Scoring by quarter: 18–24, 22–12, 27–12, 26–16
Pts: Chumjinda 24; Rebs: Sriharaksa 15; Asts: Phuekraksa 4		Pts: Law N.W. 18; Rebs: Lue S.T. 10; Asts: Poon W.N., Mok S.K., Law N.W. 2

Kanteerava Indoor Stadium, Bangalore
Referees: Kim Jong-Kuk (KOR), Nicolas Fernandes (TAH), Rakesh Ramalingaiah (IND)

=== Knockout round ===
==== Bracket ====
Quarterfinals
26 October
Australia	123
Hong Kong	29
26 October
China	72
South Korea	57
26 October
New Zealand	80
Thailand	52
26 October
Japan	82
Chinese Taipei	49

Semifinals
27 October
Australia	86
China	46
27 October
New Zealand	65
Japan	97

Final
28 October
Australia	61
Japan	60
Third place game
28 October
China	60
New Zealand	43

5th place bracket

5th–8th place semifinals
27 October
Hong Kong	63
South Korea	109
27 October
Thailand	69
Chinese Taipei	74

Fifth place game
28 October
South Korea	69
Chinese Taipei	52
Seventh place game
28 October
Hong Kong	59
Thailand	83

==== Quarterfinals ====
26 October 2017
11:00

Boxscore

Australia	123–29	Hong Kong
Scoring by quarter: 34–3, 29–13, 32–4, 28–9
Pts: Amoore 17; Rebs: Rees 12; Asts: Melbourne 7		Pts: Law N.W., Yeung Y.H. 5 Rebs: Law N.W. 3 Asts: Dai T.Y. 2

Kanteerava Indoor Stadium, Bangalore
Referees: Preeda Muongmee (THA), Fahimeh Alimoradihademan (IRI), Nicolas Fernandes (TAH)

26 October 2017
13:15

Boxscore

China	72–57	South Korea
Scoring by quarter: 20–7, 23–22, 16–17, 13–11
Pts: Liu Y.T. 17; Rebs: Liu Y.T. 21; Asts: Zhou 4		Pts: Na G.B., Eom S.O. 12; Rebs: Heo Y.U., Lee D.Y. 7 Asts: Heo Y.U. 5

Kanteerava Indoor Stadium, Bangalore
Referees: Ricor Buaron (PHI), Imran Ali Baig (IND), Budi Marfan (INA)

26 October 2017
15:30

Boxscore

New Zealand	80–52	Thailand
Scoring by quarter: 19–12, 18–9, 20–14, 23–17
Pts: Lokotui 19; Rebs: Pupuke-Robati 15; Asts: Lokotui, Samia 3		Pts: Phuekraksa 14; Rebs: Sarathana 8 Asts: Chumjinda, Sirisathaphornsap 3

Kanteerava Indoor Stadium, Bangalore
Referees: Snehal Bendke (IND), Lee Ji-Youn Lee (KOR), Yuen Chun Yip (HKG)

26 October 2017
17:45

Boxscore

Japan	82–49	Chinese Taipei
Scoring by quarter: 26–9, 21–11, 15–16, 20–13
Pts: Noguchi 18; Rebs: Hirashita 10; Asts: Takahashi 6		Pts: Ting C.J. 14; Rebs: Lin C.J. 13; Asts: Tseng H.Y. 4

Kanteerava Indoor Stadium, Bangalore
Referees: Alexandr Rulyov (KAZ), Kim Jong-Kuk (KOR), Rakesh Ramalingaiah (IND)

==== 5th–8th place semifinals ====
27 October 2017
11:00

Boxscore

Hong Kong	63–109	South Korea
Scoring by quarter: 11–30, 13–24, 17–26, 22–29
Pts: Chan N.Y. 16; Rebs: Ho P.Y. 8 Asts: Mok S.K. 7		Pts: Choi M.H. 24; Rebs: Park S.E. 12; Asts: Jeon H.K. 14

Kanteerava Indoor Stadium, Bangalore
Referees: Peng Ling (CHN), Fahimeh Alimoradihamedan (IRI), Gayan Buddhika Kahingala Waduge (SRI)

27 October 2017
13:15

Boxscore

Thailand	69–74	Chinese Taipei
Scoring by quarter: 17–26, 14–18, 22–11, 16–19
Pts: Sriharaksa 20; Rebs: Sriharaksa 15; Asts: Jantarwong, Sriharaksa 3		Pts: Lin C.J. 21; Rebs: Cheng H.T. 15; Asts: Li Y.J. 4

Kanteerava Indoor Stadium, Bangalore
Referees: Imran Ali Baig (IND), Lim Wee Chun (MAS), Rakesh Ramalingaiah (IND)

==== Semifinals ====
27 October 2017
15:30

Boxscore

Australia	86–46	China
Scoring by quarter: 17–4, 27–16, 30–10, 12–16
Pts: Emma-Nnopu 17; Rebs: Emma-Nnopu 6 Asts: Heal, Palmer, Fowler 3		Pts: Wan J.Y. 11; Rebs: Huang, Wan J.Y., Liu Y.T. 6 Asts: Wang Y. 2

Kanteerava Indoor Stadium, Bangalore
Referees: Budi Marfan (INA), Kim Jong-Kuk (KOR), Preeda Muongmee (THA)

27 October 2017
17:45

Boxscore

New Zealand	65–97	Japan
Scoring by quarter: 16–25, 13–23, 19–22, 17–27
Pts: Leger-Walker 22; Rebs: Pupuke-Robati 8 Asts: Leger-Walker 5		Pts: Shuto 24; Rebs: Nakazawa 8 Asts: 4 players 3

Kanteerava Indoor Stadium, Bangalore
Referees: Ricor Buaron (PHI), Snehal Bendke (IND), Alexandr Rulyov (KAZ)

==== Seventh place game ====
28 October 2017
11:00

Boxscore

Hong Kong	59–83	Thailand
Scoring by quarter: 11–20, 6–15, 21–29, 21–19
Pts: Law N.W. 15; Rebs: Lue S.T. 9 Asts: Mok S.K. 4		Pts: Sriharaksa 25; Rebs: Sarathana 19; Asts: Phuekraksa 6

Kanteerava Indoor Stadium, Bangalore
Referees: Lim Wee Chun (MAS), Raj Kumar Maharjan (NEP), Rakesh Ramalingaiah (IND)

==== Fifth place game ====
28 October 2017
13:15

Boxscore

South Korea	69–52	Chinese Taipei
Scoring by quarter: 13–11, 27–13, 12–21, 17–7
Pts: Eom S.O. 20; Rebs: Eom S.O. 10; Asts: Heo Y.U. 7		Pts: Ting C.J. 14; Rebs: Lin C.J. 12; Asts: Li Y.J. 7

Kanteerava Indoor Stadium, Bangalore
Referees: Imran Ali Baig (IND), Fahimeh Alimoradihamedan (IRI) Gayan Buddhika Kahingala Waduge (SRI)

==== Third place game ====
28 October 2017
15:30

Boxscore

China	60–43	New Zealand
Scoring by quarter: 18–13, 19–7, 10–13, 13–10
Pts: Zheng 20; Rebs: Liu Y.T. 15; Asts: Zhou 5		Pts: Rogers 12; Rebs: Leger-Walker 9 Asts: Dalton, Rogers 2

Kanteerava Indoor Stadium, Bangalore
Referees: Kumiko Kumagai (JPN), Preeda Muongmee (THA), Alexandr Rulyov (KAZ)

==== Final ====
28 October 2017
20:00

Boxscore

Australia	61–60	Japan
Scoring by quarter: 18–26, 14–15, 16–10, 13–9
Pts: Palmer 14; Rebs: Emma-Nnopu, Fowler 10; Asts: Palmer 4		Pts: Hirashita 15; Rebs: Ikematsu, Hirashita 6 Asts: Takahashi 4

Kanteerava Indoor Stadium, Bangalore
Referees: Snehal Bendke (IND), Ricor Buaron (PHI), Kim Jong-Kuk (KOR)

== Division B ==
All times are local (UTC+05:30)

=== Preliminary round ===
==== Group A ====
Pos	Team	Pld	W	L	PF	PA	PD	Pts
1	India (H)	3	3	0	289	148	+141	6
2	Iran	3	2	1	226	205	+21	5
3	Sri Lanka	3	1	2	202	218	−16	4
4	Nepal	3	0	3	117	263	−146	3

Source: FIBA
Rules for classification: 1) Points; 2) Head-to-head results; 3) Points difference; 4) Points scored.
(H) Hosts

22 October 2017
20:00

Boxscore

India	106–37	Nepal
Scoring by quarter: 26–8, 23–8, 34–4, 23–17
Pts: Yadav 23; Rebs: Senthil Kumar 11; Asts: Yadav 7		Pts: Magar 11; Rebs: Magar 9 Asts: E. Shrestha 4

Kanteerava Indoor Stadium, Bangalore
Referees: Yuen Chun Yip (HKG), Shigeyuki Arisawa (JPN), Chang Lu-yueh (TPE)

23 October 2017
16:45

Boxscore

Nepal	32–89	Iran
Scoring by quarter: 10–23, 4–22, 8–23, 10–21
Pts: N. Sherpa 9 Rebs: Magar 14; Asts: Magar, R. Shrestha 2		Pts: Talakoub 17; Rebs: Maleki 18; Asts: Talakoub 4

Koramangala Indoor Stadium, Bangalore
Referees: Shigeyuki Arisawa (JPN), Kong Sin Mui (HKG), Chitchanok Srisawat (THA)

23 October 2017
20:00

Boxscore

Sri Lanka	58–86	India
Scoring by quarter: 7–30, 12–20, 12–25, 27–11
Pts: Hiniduma Kapuge 20; Rebs: L. Hettiarachchi 8 Asts: Sri Wickramage Don 3		Pts: Jayakumar 19; Rebs: Senthil Kumar 19; Asts: Yadav 10

Kanteerava Indoor Stadium, Bangalore
Referees: Preeda Muongmee (THA), Peng Ling (CHN), Sung Ming-lu (TPE)

24 October 2017
16:45

Boxscore

Nepal	48–68	Sri Lanka
Scoring by quarter: 4–20, 13–20, 18–12, 13–16
Pts: Magar 20; Rebs: Magar 29; Asts: Magar 3		Pts: Hamza 13; Rebs: Hiniduma Kapuge 8 Asts: Hiniduma Kapuge 4

Kanteerava Indoor Stadium, Bangalore
Referees: Kumiko Kumagai (JPN), Chitchanok Srisawat (THA), Sung Ming-lu (TPE)

24 October 2017
20:00

Boxscore

India	97–53	Iran
Scoring by quarter: 27–19, 23–7, 31–15, 16–12
Pts: Yadav 29; Rebs: Senthil Kumar 10; Asts: Karwa 7		Pts: Shirazi 12; Rebs: Ghaffari 11; Asts: Nazari 4

Kanteerava Indoor Stadium, Bangalore
Referees: Peng Ling (CHN), Shigeyuki Arisawa (JPN), Lee Ji-Youn (KOR)

25 October 2017
15:30

Boxscore

Sri Lanka	76–84	Iran
Scoring by quarter: 19–20, 14–15, 23–25, 20–24
Pts: L. Hettiarachchi 21; Rebs: L. Hettiarachchi 16; Asts: Ilangathilaka Mudiyanselage, Ruppegoda Gamage 3		Pts: Ghazvini 26; Rebs: Maleki 24; Asts: Ghazvini 3

Kanteerava Indoor Stadium, Bangalore
Referees: Yuen Chun Yip (HKG), Kumiko Yumagai (JPN), Lee Ji-Youn (KOR)

==== Group B ====
Pos	Team	Pld	W	L	PF	PA	PD	Pts
1	Malaysia	2	2	0	194	64	+130	4
2	Kazakhstan	2	1	1	164	74	+90	3
3	Maldives	2	0	2	24	244	−220	2

Source: FIBA
Rules for classification: 1) Points; 2) Head-to-head results; 3) Points difference; 4) Points scored.

22 October 2017
17:45

Boxscore

Malaysia	130–14	Maldives
Scoring by quarter: 32–3, 46–6, 27–2, 25–3
Pts: Tan L.T., Lim S.Y. 15; Rebs: J. Lim 11; Asts: Tang S.X., Yap S.H., Fu Y.L. 5		Pts: Wildhan 8 Rebs: Nashid 6 Asts: 0

Koramangala Indoor Stadium, Bangalore
Referees: Peng Ling (CHN), Kumiko Kumagai (JPN), Preeda Muongmee (THA)

23 October 2017
17:45

Boxscore

Kazakhstan	50–64	Malaysia
Scoring by quarter: 8–16, 7–13, 18–20, 17–15
Pts: Umerova 11; Rebs: Komarova, Serikova 8 Asts: Abdurashitova 4		Pts: Yap S.H. 18; Rebs: Ng 14; Asts: Tan H.Y. 3

Koramangala Indoor Stadium, Bangalore
Referees: Yuen Chun Yip (HKG), Chang Lu-yueh (TPE), Ge Qian (CHN)

24 October 2017
14:30

Boxscore

Maldives	10–114	Kazakhstan
Scoring by quarter: 4–28, 4–19, 0–36, 2–31
Pts: Hussain 4 Rebs: Nasir 5 Asts: Wildhan 1		Pts: Abbassova 18; Rebs: Marchenko 11; Asts: Abdurashitova 5

Koramangala Indoor Stadium, Bangalore
Referees: Kong Sin Mui (HKG), Ge Qian (CHN), Preeda Muongmee (THA)

=== Knockout round ===
==== Bracket ====
Quarterfinals
26 October
Kazakhstan	71
Sri Lanka	58
26 October
Iran	129
Maldives	39
26 October
Malaysia	88
Nepal	36

Semifinals
27 October
Kazakhstan	40
India	77
27 October
Iran	68
Malaysia	85

Final
28 October
India	64
Malaysia	48
Third place game
28 October
Kazakhstan	61
Iran	47

5th place bracket

5th–7th place semifinal
27 October
Maldives	32
Nepal	72

Fifth place
28 October
Sri Lanka	74
Nepal	38

==== Quarterfinals ====
26 October 2017
14:30

Boxscore

Kazakhstan	71–58	Sri Lanka
Scoring by quarter: 13–17, 22–19, 18–9, 18–13

Koramangala Indoor Stadium, Bangalore
Referees: Shigeyuki Arisawa (JPN), Chang Lu-yueh (TPE), Sung Ming-lu (TPE)

26 October 2017
16:45

Boxscore

Iran	129–39	Maldives
Scoring by quarter: 25–7, 34–10, 25–18, 45–4
Pts: Golmohammadi 14; Rebs: Nastarantehrani 24; Asts: Nazari, Talakoub 6		Pts: Amir 10; Rebs: Nashid 12; Asts: 5 players 1

Koramangala Indoor Stadium, Bangalore
Referees: Lim Wee Chun (MAS), Ge Qian (CHN), Raj Kumar Maharjan (NEP)

26 October 2017
20:00

Boxscore

Malaysia	88–36	Nepal
Scoring by quarter: 13–11, 20–2, 36–11, 19–12
Pts: Lee 13; Rebs: Fu Y.L. 12; Asts: Wong Z.W. 5		Pts: Magar 9 Rebs: Magar 14; Asts: T. Sherpa, Magar, E. Shrestha 3

Koramangala Indoor Stadium, Bangalore
Referees: Kong Sin Mui (HKG), Gayan Buddhika Kahingala Waduge (SRI), Chitchanok Srisawat (THA)

==== 5th–7th place semifinal ====
27 October 2017
14:30

Boxscore

Maldives	32–72	Nepal
Scoring by quarter: 4–26, 7–11, 14–13, 7–22
Pts: Wildhan 14; Rebs: Hamza 11; Asts: 4 players 1		Pts: Gautam 14; Rebs: T. Sherpa 19; Asts: Gautam 17

Koramangala Indoor Stadium, Bangalore
Referees: Shigeyuki Arisawa (JPN), Chang Lu-yueh (TPE), Ge Qian (CHN)

==== Semifinals ====
27 October 2017
16:45

Boxscore

Iran	68–85	Malaysia
Scoring by quarter: 17–17, 16–18, 18–28, 17–22
Pts: Ghazvini 25; Rebs: Golmohammadi 23; Asts: 4 players 2		Pts: Tan L.T. 22; Rebs: Ng 18; Asts: Wong Z.W., Tan H.Y. 8

Koramangala Indoor Stadium, Bangalore
Referees: Lee Ji-Youn (KOR), Kong Sin Mui (HKG), Sung Ming-lu (TPE)

27 October 2017
20:00

Boxscore

Kazakhstan	40–77	India
Scoring by quarter: 11–18, 9–27, 10–16, 10–16
Pts: Komarova 12; Rebs: Umerova 6 Asts: Ignatiadi, Abdurashitova 2		Pts: Yadav 21; Rebs: Senthil Kumar 16; Asts: Karwa, Yadav 7

Kanteerava Indoor Stadium, Bangalore
Referees: Yuen Chun Yip (HKG), Nicolas Fernandes (TAH), Kumiko Kumagai (JPN)

==== Fifth place game ====
28 October 2017
09:00

Boxscore

Sri Lanka	74–38	Nepal
Scoring by quarter: 19–15, 9–8, 23–8, 23–7
Pts: Hamza 22; Rebs: L. Hettiarachchi 20; Asts: Hiniduma Kapuge 5		Pts: Magar 14; Rebs: T. Sherpa 14; Asts: T. Sherpa, Magar 3

Kanteerava Indoor Stadium, Bangalore
Referees: Chitchanok Srisawat (THA), Kong Sin Mui (HKG), Peng Ling (CHN)

==== Third place game ====
28 October 2017
14:30

Boxscore

Iran	47–61	Kazakhstan
Scoring by quarter: 7–17, 14–16, 15–14, 11–14
Pts: Ghazvini 20; Rebs: Golmohammadi 14; Asts: Ghaffari 3		Pts: Komarova 17; Rebs: Marchenko 12; Asts: Abdurashitova 7

Koramangala Indoor Stadium, Bangalore
Referees: Shigeyuki Arisawa (JPN), Chang Lu-yueh (TPE), Lee Ji-Youn (KOR)

==== Final ====
28 October 2017
17:45

Boxscore

Malaysia	48–64	India
Scoring by quarter: 3–15, 21–17, 10–20, 14–12
Pts: Wong Z.W. 14; Rebs: Ng 14; Asts: Lim J.Z., Ng 3		Pts: Yadav 14; Rebs: Yadav 12; Asts: Karwa 10

Kanteerava Indoor Stadium, Bangalore
Referees: Nicolas Fernandes (TAH), Budi Marfan (INA), Yuen Chun Yip (HKG)

== Final standings ==
Qualified for the 2018 FIBA Under-17 Women's Basketball World Cup
Relegated to Division B of the 2019 FIBA U16 Women's Asian Championship

Rank	Team	Record
1st place, gold medalist(s)	Australia	6–0
2nd place, silver medalist(s)	Japan	5–1
3rd place, bronze medalist(s)	China	4–2
4	New Zealand	3–3
5	South Korea	3–3
6	Chinese Taipei	1–5
7	Thailand	2–4
8	Hong Kong	0–6

Promoted to Division A of the 2019 FIBA U16 Women's Asian Championship

Rank	Team	Record
1	India	5–0
2	Malaysia	4–1
3	Kazakhstan	3–2
4	Iran	3–3
5	Sri Lanka	2–3
6	Nepal	1–5
7	Maldives	0–4

== Statistical leaders ==
=== Players ===
Points

Pos.	Name	PPG
1	(India) Vaishnavi Yadav	22.3
2	(New Zealand) Charlisse Leger-Walker	20.0
3	(China) Yutong Liu	16.3
4	(Sri Lanka) Thisari Hiniduma Kapuge	16.0
4	(Chinese Taipei) Chia-Jung Lin	16.0
5	(Malaysia) Siew Hong Yap	15.0

Rebounds

Pos.	Name	RPG
1	(Nepal) Pratikshya Magar	17.3
2	(Iran) Ghazal Maleki	16.0
3	(India) Pushpa Senthil Kumar	13.3
4	(China) Yutong Liu	13.0
5	(New Zealand) Sharne Pupuke-Robati	12.0

Steals

Pos.	Name	SPG
1	(India) Vaishnavi Yadav	5.3
2	(Malaysia) Ze Wei Wong	5.0
3	(South Korea) Yeeun Heo	4.7
4	(South Korea) Yerim Jung	4.0
4	(Japan) Maika Miura	4.0
4	(Kazakhstan) Alexandra Kumarova	4.0

Assists

Pos.	Name	APG
1	(South Korea) Yeeun Heo	8.7
2	(India) Vaishnavi Yadav	7.3
3	(China) Ming Zheng	6.3
4	(Chinese Taipei) Hsuan-Yi Tseng	6.0
5	(New Zealand) Charlisse Leger-Walker	4.7
5	(India) Neha Karwa	4.7

Blocks

Pos.	Name	BPG
1	(India) Sanjana Ramesh	3.0
2	(China) Muyao Guo	2.0
2	(Malaysia) Tricia Ng	2.0
3	(Japan) Lina Nakazawa	1.7
3	(Australia) Olivia Pollerd	1.7
3	(Thailand) Yada Sriharaksa	1.7
3	(Chinese Taipei) Chih-Jung Ting	1.7

Other statistical leaders

Stat	Name	Avg.
Field goal percentage	(Japan) Sakura Noguchi (China) Jiyuan Wan	71.4%
3-point FG percentage	(Japan) Yu Suzuki (Malaysia) Zi Wei Wong	50.0%
Free throw percentage	(China) Muyao Guo	100%
Turnovers	(Maldives) Mariyam Wildhan	12.5
Fouls	(South Korea) Yeeun Heo	4.7

=== Teams ===
Points

Pos.	Name	PPG
1	India	96.3
2	Japan	95.0
3	Malaysia	94.0
5	Australia	88.8
5	China	88.8
5	Iran	88.8

Rebounds

Pos.	Name	RPG
1	Kazakhstan	72.5
2	China	71.0
3	Iran	69.8
4	Malaysia	66.7
5	Australia	62.0

Assists

Pos.	Name	APG
1	India	25.0
2	Japan	22.3
3	China	22.0
4	Australia	20.3
5	Malaysia	19.3

Steals

Pos.	Name	SPG
1	Malaysia	25.7
2	Japan	21.3
3	Kazakhstan	20.0
4	South Korea	19.8
5	India	19.3

Blocks

Pos.	Name	BPG
1	China	6.5
2	Australia	6.3
3	Chinese Taipei	4.8
4	Japan	4.3
4	India	4.3

Other statistical leaders

Stat	Name	Avg.
Field goal percentage	India	52.2%
3-point FG percentage	Chinese Taipei	30.0%
Free throw percentage	Australia	70.7%
Turnovers	Maldives	50.0
Fouls	South Korea	26.5
