= Liu Yutong (basketball) =

Chinese basketball player (born 2001)

No. 23 – Shanghai Swordfish
- Position: Center
- League: WCBA

Personal information
- Born: 5 February 2001 (age 25) Harbin, Heilongjiang, China
- Listed height: 6 ft 7 in (2.01 m)
- Listed weight: 243 lb (110 kg)

Career information
- High school: Tsinghua University High School
- College: Beijing Normal University
- Playing career: 2020–present

Career history
- 2023-2025: Shanxi Flame
- 2025: Beijing Great Wall
- 2025-present: Shanghai Swordfish

Career highlights
- CUBA MVP (2020); CUBA Champion (2019, 2020, 2021); WCBA All-Star (2024); WCBA Rookie of the Year (2024)
Medals
Women's basketball
Representing China
Summer World University Games
Gold medal – first place	2025 Rhine-Ruhr
Gold medal – first place	2021 Chengdu
U18 Asia Cup
Gold medal – first place	2018 India
U16 Asia Cup
Bronze medal – third place	2017 India
Gold medal – first place	2015 Indonesia

Liu Yutong (Chinese: 刘禹彤) is a Chinese basketball player, playing for the Shanghai Swordfish in the Women's Chinese Basketball Association. She is a center known for her physical playstyle, and nicknamed Big Baby and Female Shaq.

== Early life ==
She attended Tsinghua University High School, where she was a teammate of Han Xu.

== College career ==
Playing for Beijing Normal University, she led the university to three consecutive national titles, first in 2019 against Peking University, scoring 30 points and 16 rebounds, then in 2020 and 2021 against Tsinghua University.

In 2020, she earned the Chinese University Basketball Association's MVP.

== Professional career ==
As a rookie Shanxi Flame player, she became an All-Star in the 2023-2024 WCBA season.

After missing nearly two months of the 2024-2025 season, she was released by the Shanxi Flame and subsequently signed with the Beijing Great Wall.

== International career ==
Yutong represented China at the 2015 FIBA Asia Under-16 Championship for Women, 2016 FIBA Under-17 World Championship for Women, 2017 FIBA Under-16 Women's Asian Championship, 2018 FIBA Under-17 Women's Basketball World Cup and the 2018 FIBA U18 Women's Asian Championship.

She won the gold medal playing for China at the 2021 and 2025 World University Games.

She played her first game on the senior national team on March 4, 2026 in a 74-69 win against Brazil, scoring 12 points and 5 rebounds.
