= 2013 FIBA Asia Under-16 Championship for Women =

3rd FIBA Under-16 Women's Asian Basketball Championship

Tournament details
- Host country: Sri Lanka
- City: Colombo
- Dates: 23–30 November
- Teams: 12 (from 1 confederation)
- Venue(s): 1 (in 1 host city)

Final positions
- Champions: China (2nd title)
- Runners-up: Japan
- Third place: South Korea

Tournament statistics
- Top scorer: (Sri Lanka) Samarasinghe (Hong Kong) Cheung W.S. (14.4)
- Top rebounds: (Kazakhstan) Arzamastseva (13.5)
- Top assists: (China) Zhang M.M. (7.1)
- PPG (Team): China; Japan (84.7)
- RPG (Team): China (56.3)
- APG (Team): China (21.1)

Official website
- 2013 FIBA Asia U-16 Championship for Women

The 2013 FIBA Asia Under-16 Championship for Women is the qualifying tournament for FIBA Asia at the 2014 FIBA Under-17 World Championship for Women. The tournament was held in Colombo, Sri Lanka from 23 to 30 November 2013. Sugathadasa Indoor Stadium was the main venue for the entire tournament.

China defeated Japan in the finals, 62–50 to notch their second title, while Korea thrashed Chinese Taipei in the battle for Third Place, 86–64. China, Japan and Korea will represent FIBA Asia at the 2014 FIBA Under-17 World Championship for Women which will be held in Slovakia.

The championship was divided into two levels: Level I and Level II. The two lowest finishers of Level I met the top two finishers of Level II to determine which teams qualified for the top Level of the 2015 Championship. The losers were relegated to Level II.

== Participating teams ==
Level I	Level II
China; Chinese Taipei; India; Japan; South Korea; Malaysia	Hong Kong; Jordan; Kazakhstan; Sri Lanka; Indonesia; Thailand

== Preliminary round ==
=== Level I ===
Advances to the semifinals
Advances to the qualifying round

Team	Pld	W	L	PF	PA	PD	Pts
Japan	5	5	0	444	222	+222	10
China	5	4	1	450	278	+172	9
South Korea	5	3	2	381	334	+47	8
Chinese Taipei	5	2	3	387	366	+21	7
India	5	1	4	259	487	–228	6
Malaysia	5	0	5	171	405	–234	5

23 November 2013
13:00

Box Scores

Japan	112–45	India
Scoring by quarter: 25–3, 25–17, 24–13, 38–12
Pts: Endo 15; Rebs: Goto 11; Asts: Mizuno 3		Pts: Thimmaiah 15; Rebs: Venkataraman 8 Asts: Vandana 3

Sugathadasa Indoor Stadium, Colombo
Referees: Haryanto Sutaryo (INA), Yevgeniy Mikheyev (KAZ), Ahmad Suleiman Alyousef (JOR)

23 November 2013
15:00

Box Scores

Chinese Taipei	85–30	Malaysia
Scoring by quarter: 17–7, 29–8, 22–5, 17–10
Pts: Cho 16; Rebs: Cho, Hsu T.Y., Hsu Y.L. 7 Asts: Chiu J.L. 5		Pts: Hiew K.L. 9 Rebs: Hiew K.L. 11; Asts: 4 players 1

Sugathadasa Indoor Stadium, Colombo
Referees: Watcharin Padungratchadakit (THA), Yoji Fujigaki (JPN), Alexandr Rulyov (KAZ)

23 November 2013
17:00

Box Scores

South Korea	50–82	China
Scoring by quarter: 13–18, 15–22, 12–15, 10–27
Pts: An H.J. 11; Rebs: An H.J. 8 Asts: An H.J. 3		Pts: Ha W.X., Dilana 16; Rebs: Ha W.X. 16; Asts: Zhang M.M. 8

Sugathadasa Indoor Stadium, Colombo
Referees: Yevgeniy Mikheyev (KAZ), Ahmad Suleiman Alyousef (JOR), Haryanto Sutaryo (INA)

24 November 2013
13:00

Box Scores

Chinese Taipei	56–87	Japan
Scoring by quarter: 16–27, 9–24, 16–14, 15–22
Pts: Wang J.T. 11; Rebs: Hsu Y.L. 10; Asts: Chiu J.L. 3		Pts: Mizuno 22; Rebs: Nakada 7 Asts: Endo 6

Sugathadasa Indoor Stadium, Colombo
Referees: Yevgeniy Mikheyev (KAZ), Watcharin Padungratchadakit (THA), Imran Ali Baig (IND)

24 November 2013
15:00

Box Scores

China	109–51	India
Scoring by quarter: 31–8, 27–10, 26–17, 25–16
Pts: Wang Z. 24; Rebs: Ha W.X. 10; Asts: Wang J.Q. 5		Pts: Verma 15; Rebs: Vandana, Verma 5 Asts: Thimmaiah 3

Sugathadasa Indoor Stadium, Colombo
Referees: Haryanto Sutaryo (INA), Ahmad Suleiman Alyousef (JOR), Ng Pei Yin (MAS)

24 November 2013
17:00

Box Scores

Malaysia	46–86	South Korea
Scoring by quarter: 14–17, 8–24, 15–26, 9–19
Pts: Lim 14; Rebs: R. Wong 6 Asts: Ho C.Y., Ng Y.F., Khoo K.S. 2		Pts: Choi S.H. 17; Rebs: Yun Y.B., Kim S.Y. 6 Asts: Park G.R., An H.J. 4

Sugathadasa Indoor Stadium, Colombo
Referees: Yoji Fujigaki (JPN), Alexandr Rulyov (KAZ), Watcharin Padungratchadakit (THA)

25 November 2013
13:00

Box Scores

Japan	75–59	China
Scoring by quarter: 20–18, 21–14, 18–9, 16–18
Pts: Nakada 22; Rebs: Nishioka 11; Asts: Shibuya 4		Pts: Zou Q.J. 18; Rebs: Ha W.X. 9 Asts: Zhang M.M. 7

Sugathadasa Indoor Stadium, Colombo
Referees: Watcharin Padungratchadakit (THA), Yevgeniy Mikheyev (KAZ), Ahmad Suleiman Alyousef (JOR)

25 November 2013
15:00

Box Scores

South Korea	89–67	Chinese Taipei
Scoring by quarter: 25–27, 34–12, 18–14, 12–14
Pts: Kang Y.L. 21; Rebs: Han E.J. 14; Asts: An H.J. 5		Pts: Chiu J.L. 12; Rebs: Hsu Y.L. 6 Asts: Kao Y.L. 6

Sugathadasa Indoor Stadium, Colombo
Referees: Snehal Bendke (IND), Haryanto Sutaryo (INA), Alexandr Rulyov (KAZ)

25 November 2013
17:00

Box Scores

India	57–55	Malaysia
Scoring by quarter: 17–10, 12–14, 14–19, 14–12
Pts: Hemmige 12; Rebs: Kollam 16; Asts: Varkey 6		Pts: Hiew K.L. 12; Rebs: Lim, Hiew K.L. 11; Asts: Khoo K.S. 4

Sugathadasa Indoor Stadium, Colombo
Referees: Yevgeniy Mikheyev (KAZ), Ahmad Suleiman Alyousef (JOR), Watcharin Padungratchadakit (THA)

26 November 2013
13:00

Box Scores

South Korea	50–83	Japan
Scoring by quarter: 12–22, 14–25, 7–16, 17–20
Pts: Kim Y.J. 11; Rebs: An H.J. 10; Asts: Park G.R. 4		Pts: Mizuno 15; Rebs: Akaho 11; Asts: Shibuya 6

Sugathadasa Indoor Stadium, Colombo
Referees: Snehal Bendke (IND), Watcharin Padungratchadakit (THA), Alexandr Rulyov (KAZ)

26 November 2013
15:00

Box Scores

Malaysia	28–90	China
Scoring by quarter: 6–27, 6–18, 7–23, 9–22
Pts: Khoo K.S. 9 Rebs: Khoo K.S., Hiew K.L. 5 Asts: Ng Y.F. 2		Pts: Zhang L.G. 18; Rebs: Zhang L.G. 15; Asts: Sun Y.M., Zhang M.M. 7

Sugathadasa Indoor Stadium, Colombo
Referees: Yevgeniy Mikheyev (KAZ), Ahmad Suleiman Alyousef (JOR), Imran Ali Baig (IND)

26 November 2013
17:00

Box Scores

Chinese Taipei	105–50	India
Scoring by quarter: 28–16, 29–19, 24–8, 24–7
Pts: Hsu Y.L. 24; Rebs: Wang J.T. 12; Asts: Yang Y.T., Peng H.T. 6		Pts: Varkey 9 Rebs: Thimmaiah 7 Asts: Varkey 5

Sugathadasa Indoor Stadium, Colombo
Referees: Ng Pei Yin (MAS), Alexandr Rulyov (KAZ), Haryanto Sutaryo (INA)

27 November 2013
13:00

Box Scores

Malaysia	12–87	Japan
Scoring by quarter: 3–28, 4–19, 3–23, 2–17
Pts: Lim 4 Rebs: Hiew K.L. 6 Asts: Tan Y.W. 1		Pts: Nakamura 12; Rebs: Waki, Akaho 10; Asts: Waki, Shibuya 4

Sugathadasa Indoor Stadium, Colombo
Referees: Haryanto Sutaryo (INA), Yevgeniy Mikheyev (KAZ), Ahmad Suleiman Alyousef (JOR)

27 November 2013
15:00

Box Scores

India	56–106	South Korea
Scoring by quarter: 16–34, 6–22, 14–28, 20–22
Pts: Thimmaiah 9 Rebs: Kollam 10; Asts: Kollam 2		Pts: Yun Y.B. 23; Rebs: An H.J. 9 Asts: An H.J. 12

Sugathadasa Indoor Stadium, Colombo
Referees: Watcharin Padungratchadakit (THA), Ng Pei Yin (MAS), Alexandr Rulyov (KAZ)

27 November 2013
17:00

Box Scores

China	110–74	Chinese Taipei
Scoring by quarter: 27–12, 25–27, 26–16, 32–19
Pts: Dilana 26; Rebs: Wang H.M., Wang Z. 10; Asts: Wang H.M. 10		Pts: Hsu T.Y. 13; Rebs: Hsu T.Y. 3 Asts: Kao Y.L. 4

Sugathadasa Indoor Stadium, Colombo
Referees: Snehal Bendke (IND), Haryanto Sutaryo (INA), Yevgeniy Mikheyev (KAZ)

=== Level II ===
Advances to the qualifying round

Team	Pld	W	L	PF	PA	PD	Pts	First Tiebreaker Classification for Tied Teams	Second Tiebreaker Basket Average for Tied Teams
Thailand	5	5	0	376	242	+134	10		
Kazakhstan	5	3	2	308	283	+25	8	1W–1L	(133/115, 1.1565)
Indonesia	5	3	2	252	258	–6	8	1W–1L	(96/92, 1.0435)
Hong Kong	5	3	2	292	279	+13	8	1W–1L	(90/112, 0.8036)
Jordan	5	1	4	295	352	–57	6		
Sri Lanka	5	0	5	228	337	–109	5		

23 November 2013
9:00

Box Scores

Kazakhstan	36–65	Thailand
Scoring by quarter: 10–15, 15–13, 7–22, 4–15
Pts: Arzamastseva 11; Rebs: Arzamastseva 9 Asts: Abikeyeva 2		Pts: Lumdappang 16; Rebs: Lumdappang 7 Asts: Srijunvong 3

Sugathadasa Indoor Stadium, Colombo
Referees: Yoji Fujigaki (JPN), Imran Ali Baig (IND), Hu Ji (CHN)

23 November 2013
11:00

Box Scores

Indonesia	62–59	Jordan
Scoring by quarter: 18–17, 11–17, 15–10, 18–15
Pts: Wijaya 17; Rebs: Wijaya 7 Asts: Paramita, Wijaya 3		Pts: Abu Jbara 19; Rebs: Abu Jbara 5 Asts: Abu Jbara, Khuzouz 3

Sugathadasa Indoor Stadium, Colombo
Referees: Liu Wei (CHN), Chen Ming-ling (TPE), Shin Gi-Rok (KOR)

23 November 2013
19:30

Box Scores

Hong Kong	57–46	Sri Lanka
Scoring by quarter: 14–12, 13–10, 15–12, 15–12
Pts: Cheung W.S. 20; Rebs: Fong T.Y. 11; Asts: Fong T.Y. 4		Pts: M. de Silva 17; Rebs: Gallassage 13; Asts: M. de Silva 7

Sugathadasa Indoor Stadium, Colombo
Referees: Snehal Bendke (IND), Tien Hsiao-lun (TPE), Ng Pei Yin (MAS)

24 November 2013
9:00

Box Scores

Kazakhstan	79–52	Hong Kong
Scoring by quarter: 18–17, 11–17, 15–10, 18–15
Pts: Kovalevskaya 22; Rebs: Arzamastseva 12; Asts: Abikeyeva 6		Pts: Cheung W.S. 16; Rebs: Cheung W.N. 8 Asts: Tse Y.L., Ko T.C. 2

Sugathadasa Indoor Stadium, Colombo
Referees: Snehal Bendke (IND), Chen Ming-ling (TPE), Shin Gi-Rok (KOR)

24 November 2013
11:00

Box Scores

Thailand	71–42	Indonesia
Scoring by quarter: 12–10, 19–9, 20–11, 20–12
Pts: Prajuapsook 13; Rebs: Thuamon 8 Asts: Siriphunthanun 8		Pts: Gumanti 13; Rebs: Astari 8 Asts: Gumanti 2

Sugathadasa Indoor Stadium, Colombo
Referees: Tien Hsiao-lun (TPE), Ng Pei Yin (MAS), Hu Ji (CHN)

24 November 2013
19:00

Box Scores

Jordan	77–50	Sri Lanka
Scoring by quarter: 18–17, 11–17, 15–10, 18–15
Pts: Sabbagh 21; Rebs: Sabbagh 18; Asts: Sama'an, Shahatit, Abu Jbara 3		Pts: Samarasinghe 17; Rebs: Gallassage 15; Asts: M. de Silva 4

Sugathadasa Indoor Stadium, Colombo
Referees: Snehal Bendke (IND), Haryanto Sutaryo (INA), Liu Wei (CHN)

25 November 2013
9:00

Box Scores

Hong Kong	83–50	Jordan
Scoring by quarter: 16–8, 17–12, 24–15, 26–15
Pts: Lui S.Y. 18; Rebs: Fong T.Y., Cheung W.N. 8 Asts: Tse Y.L. 11		Pts: Sabbagh 19; Rebs: Khuzouz 8 Asts: Sama'an, Abu Jbara 3

Sugathadasa Indoor Stadium, Colombo
Referees: Ng Pei Yin (MAS), Imran Ali Baig (IND), Yoji Fujigaki (JPN)

25 November 2013
11:00

Box Scores

Indonesia	63–54 (OT)	Kazakhstan
Scoring by quarter: 6–17, 12–12, 21–9, 10–11, Overtime: 14–5
Pts: Pramesti 23; Rebs: Astari 12; Asts: Wijaya 4		Pts: Abikeyeva 16; Rebs: Arzamastseva 19; Asts: Abikeyeva 6

Sugathadasa Indoor Stadium, Colombo
Referees: Hu Ji (CHN), Shin Gi-Rok (KOR), Tien Hsiao-lun (TPE)

25 November 2013
19:00

Box Scores

Sri Lanka	51–82	Thailand
Scoring by quarter: 12–24, 19–22, 14–20, 6–16
Pts: M. de Silva 21; Rebs: Gallassage 7 Asts: M. de Silva 3		Pts: Bunsinprom, Thuamon 14; Rebs: Bunsinprom 8 Asts: Thuamon 5

Sugathadasa Indoor Stadium, Colombo
Referees: Shin Gi-Rok (KOR), Liu Wei (CHN), Chen Ming-ling (TPE)

26 November 2013
9:00

Box Scores

Indonesia	33–38	Hong Kong
Scoring by quarter: 2–9, 12–6, 10–12, 9–11
Pts: Wijaya 10; Rebs: Assipalma 15; Asts: Gumanti 3		Pts: Tse Y.L., Ko T.C. 10; Rebs: Chen 10; Asts: Ko T.C. 3

Sugathadasa Indoor Stadium, Colombo
Referees: Tien Hsiao-lun (TPE), Imran Ali Baig (IND), Shin Gi-Rok (KOR)

26 November 2013
11:00

Box Scores

Thailand	87–51	Jordan
Scoring by quarter: 19–15, 17–8, 26–11, 25–17
Pts: Srijunvong 23; Rebs: Thuamon 10; Asts: Bunsinprom 8		Pts: Sabbagh 14; Rebs: Al Hinn 16; Asts: Abu Jbara 3

Sugathadasa Indoor Stadium, Colombo
Referees: Chen Ming-ling (TPE), Yoji Fujigaki (JPN), Liu Wei (CHN)

26 November 2013
19:00

Box Scores

Kazakhstan	69–45	Sri Lanka
Scoring by quarter: 18–17, 11–17, 15–10, 18–15
Pts: Kovalevskaya 19; Rebs: Kovalevskaya 14; Asts: Abikeyeva 9		Pts: Samarasinghe 18; Rebs: Wijesundera, Gallassage 7 Asts: T. de Silva, Liyanage, M. de Silva 1

Sugathadasa Indoor Stadium, Colombo
Referees: Yoji Fujigaki (JPN), Hu Ji (CHN), Tien Hsiao-lun (TPE)

27 November 2013
9:00

Box Scores

Thailand	71–62	Hong Kong
Scoring by quarter: 17–12, 20–14, 18–20, 16–16
Pts: Bunsinprom 16; Rebs: Prajuapsook 11; Asts: Bunsinprom 6		Pts: Ko T.C. 18; Rebs: Lui S.Y. 6 Asts: Cheung W.S. 8

Sugathadasa Indoor Stadium, Colombo
Referees: Yoji Fujigaki (JPN), Tien Hsiao-lun (TPE), Chen Ming-ling (TPE)

27 November 2013
11:00

Box Scores

Jordan	58–70	Kazakhstan
Scoring by quarter: 11–12, 19–11, 13–25, 15–22
Pts: Hamadah 17; Rebs: Al Hinn 20; Asts: Abu Jbara 3		Pts: Arzamastseva 21; Rebs: Arzamastseva 17; Asts: Abikeyeva 8

Sugathadasa Indoor Stadium, Colombo
Referees: Liu Wei (CHN), Ng Pei Yin (MAS), Hu Ji (CHN)

27 November 2013
19:00

Box Scores

Sri Lanka	36–52	Indonesia
Scoring by quarter: 18–17, 10–11, 5–11, 3–13
Pts: Samarasinghe 18; Rebs: Samarasinghe 8 Asts: Perera, Goonewardena, M. de Silva 1		Pts: Assipalma 16; Rebs: Pramesti 9 Asts: 5 players 2

Sugathadasa Indoor Stadium, Colombo
Referees: Shin Gi-Rok (KOR), Liu Wei (CHN), Imran Ali Baig (IND)

== Qualifying round ==
Winners are promoted to Level I of the 2015 FIBA Asia Under-16 Championship for Women.

29 November 2013
13:00

Box Scores

India	84–71	Kazakhstan
Scoring by quarter: 20–14, 16–22, 26–15, 22–20
Pts: Verma 24; Rebs: Hemmige 12; Asts: Varkey 11		Pts: Arzamastseva 21; Rebs: Arzamastseva 15; Asts: Abikeyeva 8

Sugathadasa Indoor Stadium, Colombo
Referees: Yoji Fujigaki (JPN), Chen Ming-ling (TPE), Shin Gi-Rok (KOR)

29 November 2013
15:00

Box Scores

Malaysia	39–59	Thailand
Scoring by quarter: 4–5, 2–21, 11–16, 22–17
Pts: Khoo K.S. 10; Rebs: Ng Y.F. 9 Asts: Khoo K.S., Lim 2		Pts: Bunsinprom, Siriphunthanum 15; Rebs: Thuamon 15; Asts: Srijunwong 6

Sugathadasa Indoor Stadium, Colombo
Referees: Liu Wei (CHN), Alexandr Yulrov (KAZ), Tsen Hsiao-lun (TPE)

== Final round ==
Top three teams qualify to the 2014 FIBA Under-17 World Championship for Women.

Semifinals
29 November 2013
China	81
South Korea	55
29 November 2013
Japan	99
Chinese Taipei	60

Final
30 November 2013
China	62
Japan	50
3rd place
30 November 2013
South Korea	86
Chinese Taipei	64

=== Semifinals ===
29 November 2013
17:00

Box Scores

China	81–55	South Korea
Scoring by quarter: 22–18, 19–12, 28–8, 12–17
Pts: Wang H.M. 19; Rebs: 4 players 7 Asts: Zhang M.M. 7		Pts: An H.J. 10; Rebs: Lee J.W. 5 Asts: Park G.R. 3

Sugathadasa Indoor Stadium, Colombo
Referees: Snehal Bendke (IND), Ng Pei Yin (MAS), Watcharin Padungratchadakit (THA)

29 November 2013
19:00

Box Scores

Japan	99–60	Chinese Taipei
Scoring by quarter: 23–11, 34–13, 25–16, 17–20
Pts: Goto, Mawuli 13; Rebs: Nishioka, Mawuli 9 Asts: Endo, Waki 5		Pts: Kao Y.L. 13; Rebs: Fang 6 Asts: Hsu Y.L., Peng H.T. 3

Sugathadasa Indoor Stadium, Colombo
Referees: Yevgeniy Mikheyev (KAZ), Imran Ali Baig (IND), Haryanto Sutaryo (INA)

=== 3rd place ===
30 November 2013
15:00

Box Scores

South Korea	86–64	Chinese Taipei
Scoring by quarter: 24–15, 18–22, 25–8, 19–19
Pts: An H.J. 22; Rebs: An H.J. 10; Asts: An H.J. 11		Pts: Hsu Y.L. 19; Rebs: Hsu Y.L. 9 Asts: Liu W.C. 5

Sugathadasa Indoor Stadium, Colombo
Referees: Liu Wei (CHN), Yoji Fujigaki (JPN), Ng Pei Yin (MAS)

=== Final ===
30 November 2013
17:00

Box Scores

China	62–50	Japan
Scoring by quarter: 9–17, 21–10, 17–12, 15–11
Pts: Wang H.M., Dilana 10; Rebs: Zhang M.M. 11; Asts: Zhang M.M. 11		Pts: Shibuya 13; Rebs: Shibuya 11; Asts: Endo 3

Sugathadasa Indoor Stadium, Colombo
Referees: Snehal Bendke (IND), Yevgeniy Mikheyev (KAZ), Watcharin Padungratchadakit (THA)

== Final standing ==
Qualified for the 2014 FIBA Under-17 World Championship for Women

Rank	Team	Record
1st place, gold medalist(s)	China	6–1
2nd place, silver medalist(s)	Japan	6–1
3rd place, bronze medalist(s)	South Korea	4–3
4	Chinese Taipei	2–5
5	India	2–4
6	Malaysia	0–6
7	Thailand	6–0
8	Kazakhstan	3–3
9	Indonesia	3–2
10	Hong Kong	3–2
11	Jordan	1–4
12	Sri Lanka	0–5

== Awards ==
2013 Asian Under-16 champions

China
Second title
