= Chinese Taipei women's national under-17 basketball team =

Chinese Taipei
- Joined FIBA: 1981
- FIBA zone: FIBA Asia
- National federation: Chinese Taipei Basketball Association
- Coach: Hsu Hsiu-mien

U17 World Cup
- Appearances: 1
- Medals: None

U16 Asia Cup
- Appearances: 6
- Medals: (bronze) Bronze: 1 (2009)

First international
- Chinese Taipei 147–20 Singapore; 2009 FIBA Asia Under-16 Championship for Women (Pune, India; 30 November 2009)

The Chinese Taipei women's national under-16 and under-17 basketball team is a national basketball team of Chinese Taipei (Taiwan), administered by the Chinese Taipei Basketball Association. It represents the country in international under-16 and under-17 women's basketball competitions.

== FIBA U16 Asia Cup Participations ==
Year	Result
2009	3rd place, bronze medalist(s)
2011	4th
2013	4th
2015	4th
2017	6th
2023	4th

== U17 World Cup record ==
Year	Pos.	Pld	W	L
(France) 2010	Did not qualify			
(Netherlands) 2012	Did not qualify			
(Czech Republic) 2014	Did not qualify			
(Spain) 2016	Did not qualify			
(Belarus) 2018	Did not qualify			
(Hungary) 2022	Did not qualify			
(Mexico) 2024	10th	7	3	4
(Czech Republic) 2026	Did not qualify			
(Indonesia) 2028	To be determined			
Total	1/9	7	3	4

== See also ==
- Chinese Taipei women's national basketball team
- Chinese Taipei women's national under-19 basketball team
- Chinese Taipei men's national under-17 basketball team
