= Malaysia women's national under-16 basketball team =

Women's under-16 basketball team

Malaysia
- Joined FIBA: 1957
- FIBA zone: FIBA Asia
- National federation: Malaysia Basketball Association

U17 World Cup
- Appearances: None

U16 Asia Cup
- Appearances: 4
- Medals: None

U16 Asia Cup Division B
- Appearances: 2
- Medals: (silver) Silver: 1 (2017); (bronze) Bronze: 1 (2023)

First international
- Malaysia 78–54 Kazakhstan; 2009 FIBA Asia Under-16 Championship for Women (Pune, India; 30 November 2009)

The Malaysia women's national under-16 basketball team is a national basketball team of Malaysia, administered by the Malaysia Basketball Association. It represents the country in international under-16 women's basketball competitions.

== FIBA U16 Asia Cup participations ==
Year	Division A	Division B
2009	8th	—N/a
2011	7th	—N/a
2013	6th	—N/a
2015	10th	—N/a
2017	—N/a	2nd place, silver medalist(s)
2023	—N/a	3rd place, bronze medalist(s)
2025	—N/a	6th

== See also ==
- Malaysia women's national basketball team
- Malaysia women's national under-18 basketball team
- Malaysia men's national under-16 basketball team
