= India women's national under-16 basketball team =

India
- Joined FIBA: 1936
- FIBA zone: FIBA Asia
- National federation: Basketball Federation of India

U17 World Cup
- Appearances: None

U16 Asia Cup
- Appearances: 5
- Medals: None

U16 Asia Cup Division B
- Appearances: 2
- Medals: (gold) Gold: 2 (2017, 2025)

First international
- India 91–64 Philippines; 2009 FIBA Asia Under-16 Championship for Women (Pune, India; 30 November 2009)

The India women's national under-16 basketball team is a national basketball team of India, administered by the Basketball Federation of India. It represents the country in international under-16 women's basketball competitions.

== Performance record ==
=== FIBA U16 Asia Cup ===
Year	Division A	Division B
2009	6th	—N/a
2011	5th	—N/a
2013	5th	—N/a
2015	6th	—N/a
2017	—N/a	1st place, gold medalist(s)
2022	5th	—N/a
2025	—N/a	1st place, gold medalist(s)

== See also ==
- India women's national basketball team
- India women's national under-18 basketball team
- India men's national under-16 basketball team
