= Natalya Popova (diver) =

Kazakhstani diver

Personal information
- Nationality: Kazakhstani
- Born: 26 May 1980 (age 44); Alma-Ata, Kazakh SSR, Soviet Union

Sport
- Sport: Diving

Natalya Popova (born 26 May 1980) is a Kazakhstani diver. She competed in the women's 3 metre springboard event at the 2000 Summer Olympics.
