= Zahra Zarei =

Iranian athlete

Zahra Zarei Manoujan (born 10 October 1996) is an Iranian athlete who specialises in 400 m events. She won a silver medal in the Women's 400 metres at the 2026 Asian Games.

== Career ==
Manoujan won a silver medal at the 2026 Asian Games clocking 53.38 seconds. She became Iran's first woman medallist in athletics at the Asian Games.
