= Serena Ho =

Hong King artist

Serena Ho, also known by her stage name mySERENA, is a Hong Kong–based artist. Her exhibitions have been shown in establishments including the CICA Museum of Seoul and the Hong Kong City Hall.

== Early life ==
Ho's father is an architect and her mother was a university professor. She later earned a graduate degree from Stanford University, and travelled to cities in Europe, Japan, and parts of the US to study painting, architecture, sculpture, and performing arts. She also completed the eighth grade of the Royal Academy of Music as a pianist.

== Career ==
Ho founded a fashion line in Hong Kong in 2019. In 2018 she became the youngest female artist to put on a solo exhibition at Hong Kong City Hall, where she also put on the solo exhibition Be in Clovers in 2018. Then in 2019 year she has also put on solo exhibitions at the Jinshan Ecool ADC Art Center in Chongqing, China, and in 2020, a solo exhibition in Tokyo, Japan entitled Cloud 9 that was intended to start a world tour before the pandemic commenced. In this exhibition she showed her “Alchemy” series, in which she applied metal processing and sculpture techniques to her paintings: first, she plated gold, silver, blue or white oil on paper and canvas, and then carved them. She has also exhibited her work in Amsterdam, and in 2021, she then held the solo exhibition Life Elements at the CICA Museum of Seoul, South Korea.

== Books ==
In 2020 Ho released two books featuring her art: one entitled A Tale of Serenity and the second entitled A Journey of Serenity.
