= Japan women's national under-17 basketball team =

Japan
- FIBA ranking: 6th ▲3 as of 2 December 2024
- Joined FIBA: 1936
- FIBA zone: FIBA Asia
- National federation: Japan Basketball Association
- Coach: Yoshikazu Suzuki

U17 World Cup
- Appearances: 8

U16 Asia Cup
- Appearances: 7
- Medals: (gold) Gold: (2011); (silver) Silver: (2009, 2013, 2015, 2017, 2022, 2023)
Home	Away
Medal record
U-16 Asian Championship
Gold medal – first place	2011 Jinan
Silver medal – second place	2009 Pune
Silver medal – second place	2013 Colombo
Silver medal – second place	2015 Medan
Silver medal – second place	2017 Bangalore

The Japan women's national under-16 and under-17 basketball team is a national basketball team of Japan, administered by the Japan Basketball Association. It represents the country in international under-16 and under-17 women's basketball competitions.

At the 2017 FIBA Under-16 Women's Asian Championship in India, Japan finished runner-up only to Australia, which Japan lost by 1 point.

== Tournament record ==
=== FIBA U17 World Cup ===
Year	Pos.	Pld	W	L
(France) 2010	5th	8	4	4
(Netherlands) 2012	4th	8	5	3
(Czech Republic) 2014	7th	7	4	3
(Spain) 2016	9th	6	4	2
(Belarus) 2018	7th	7	4	3
(Hungary) 2022	8th	7	2	5
(Mexico) 2024	6th	7	4	3
(Czech Republic) 2026	7th	7	5	2
(Indonesia) 2028	To be determined			
Total	7/9	50	28	22

=== FIBA U16 Asia Cup ===
Year	Result
2009	2nd place, silver medalist(s)
2011	1st place, gold medalist(s)
2013	2nd place, silver medalist(s)
2015	2nd place, silver medalist(s)
2017	2nd place, silver medalist(s)
2022	2nd place, silver medalist(s)
2023	2nd place, silver medalist(s)

== See also ==
- Japan women's national basketball team
- Japan women's national under-19 basketball team
- Japan men's national under-17 basketball team
