= Zhang Huimin =

Chinese long-distance runner

Zhang Huimin (张慧敏; born 1999) is a Chinese girl most famous for completing a 3,550 kilometres (2,210 mi) run from the southern Chinese province of Hainan to Beijing when she was eight years old.

For training each day, her father would get her up at 2:30 A.M. to run a marathon before school. Then after school she would run a second marathon, totaling the equivalent of running two full marathons (approximately 84-100km) per day.

Her initial feat was her Hainan to Beijing run, where she managed to complete all 3550km in just 42 days rising each day at 2:30 A.M. and running until 4:30 P.M. After this, Huimin ran from Shanghai to Nyalam County, Tibet, a distance of 5,800 kilometres (3,600 mi). Huimin managed to arrive after just 51 days. Waking once again at 2:30 A.M. each morning, she would run until 8 P.M. covering nearly 115 kilometres (71 mi) per day, and wearing out 5 pairs of shoes in the process. All the while, she was doing this at approximately 20 kilograms (≈44.1 lbs) and 1.25 metres (4 ft. 1 in.) tall .

Huimin reportedly had a way of shutting her brain off while running which allowed her to shut the rest of the world out, and she loved to run. Her father, Zhang Jianmin, who has been accused of forcing the girl to run these distances, has denied all claims, saying "I make the training fun for her. I don't push her...she loves to run. Many people don't understand us", saying that they would "soldier on" regardless of what people think.
