= China women's national under-17 basketball team =

China
- FIBA ranking: 18th ▲1 as of 2 December 2024
- Joined FIBA: 1974
- FIBA zone: FIBA Asia
- National federation: Basketball Association of the People's Republic of China
- Coach: Liu Yang

U17 World Cup
- Appearances: 5
- Medals: (bronze) Bronze: (2010)

U16 Asia Cup
- Appearances: 7
- Medals: (gold) Gold: (2009, 2013, 2015); (bronze) Bronze: (2011, 2017)
Medal record
Under-17 Women's World Cup
Bronze medal – third place	2010 Tolouse & Rodez	Team
Under-16 Women's Asia Cup
Gold medal – first place	2009 Pune	Team
Gold medal – first place	2013 Colombo	Team
Gold medal – first place	2015 Medan	Team
Bronze medal – third place	2011 Jinan	Team
Bronze medal – third place	2017 Bangalore	Team

The China women's national under-16 and under-17 basketball team is a national basketball team of the People's Republic of China, administered by the Basketball Association of the People's Republic of China. It represents the country in international under-16 and under-17 women's basketball competitions.

== Tournament record ==
=== FIBA U17 World Cup ===
Year	Pos.	Pld	W	L
(France) 2010	3rd place, bronze medalist(s)	8	6	2
(Netherlands) 2012	Did not qualify			
(Czech Republic) 2014	11th	7	3	4
(Spain) 2016	4th	7	4	3
(Belarus) 2018	11th	7	3	4
(Hungary) 2022	Did not participate			
(Mexico) 2024	Did not qualify			
(Czech Republic) 2026	6th	7	4	3
(Indonesia) 2028	To be determined			
Total	5/9	36	20	16

=== FIBA U16 Asia Cup ===
Year	Result
2009	1st place, gold medalist(s)
2011	3rd place, bronze medalist(s)
2013	1st place, gold medalist(s)
2015	1st place, gold medalist(s)
2017	3rd place, bronze medalist(s)
2023	6th
2025	4th

== See also ==
- China women's national basketball team
- China women's national under-19 basketball team
- China men's national under-17 basketball team
