= 2009 FIBA Asia Under-16 Championship for Women =

1st FIBA Under-16 Women's Asian Basketball Championship

Tournament details
- Host country: India
- City: Pune
- Dates: 30 November – 6 December
- Teams: 12 (from 1 confederation)
- Venue: 1 (in 1 host city)

Final positions
- Champions: China (1st title)
- Runners-up: Japan
- Third place: Chinese Taipei

Official website
- 2009 FIBA Asia U-16 Championship for Women

The 2009 FIBA Asia Under-16 Championship for Women is the qualifying tournament for FIBA Asia at the 2010 Under-17 World Championship for Women at Rodez and Toulouse, France. The tournament was held on Pune, India from 30 November to 6 December. China defeated Japan to notch their maiden title in the Championship.

== Draw ==
Group A	Group B
China; Chinese Taipei; Singapore; Philippines; Hong Kong; India	South Korea; Japan; Sri Lanka; Malaysia; Thailand; Kazakhstan

== Preliminary round ==
=== Group A ===
Team	Pld	W	L	PF	PA	PD	Pts
China	5	5	0	571	170	+401	10
Chinese Taipei	5	4	1	512	203	+309	9
India	5	3	2	333	361	−28	8
Philippines	5	2	3	265	441	−176	7
Hong Kong	5	1	4	238	427	−189	6
Singapore	5	0	5	183	500	−317	5

30 November
11:00

Report

China	137–28	Hong Kong
Scoring by quarter: 37–6, 35–5, 34–5, 31–12
Pts: Zhang L.T. 26; Rebs: Yu D. 2 Asts: Li M.Y., Ma X.Y. 2		Pts: Wong M.S. 7 Rebs: So 2 Asts: 0

Shree Shiv Chhatrapati Sports Complex, Pune

30 November
15:00

Chinese Taipei	147–20	Singapore
Scoring by quarter: 41–3, 35–8, 40–6, 32–3
Pts: Chen T.H. 21		Pts: Han, J. Ng 4

Shree Shiv Chhatrapati Sports Complex, Pune

30 November
18:00

Report

India	91–64	Philippines
Scoring by quarter: 21–15, 19–16, 25–19, 26–14
Pts: Rajguru 24; Rebs: Akula 1 Asts: Jeena 1		Pts: Piatos 15; Rebs: 0 Asts: Tanaman 1

Shree Shiv Chhatrapati Sports Complex, Pune

1 December
9:00

Report

Hong Kong	34–106	Chinese Taipei
Scoring by quarter: 7–23, 9–34, 9–22, 9–27
Pts: Wu S.Y. 12; Rebs: Wu S.Y., Chan W.P. 1 Asts: Wong K.Y. 1		Pts: Wang W.L. 17; Rebs: Chen H.C., Yang J. 1 Asts: Four players 1

Shree Shiv Chhatrapati Sports Complex, Pune

1 December
11:00

Report

Singapore	56–72	Philippines
Scoring by quarter: 7–21, 21–19, 13–18, 15–14
Pts: V. Chua 17; Rebs: Roslan 2 Asts: Tok H.M. 1		Pts: Jose 16; Rebs: Pioquinto 4 Asts: 0

Shree Shiv Chhatrapati Sports Complex, Pune

1 December
17:00

China	108–37	India
Scoring by quarter: 29–15, 26–0, 24–5, 29–17
Pts: Sun M.X. 16		Pts: Rajguru 8

Shree Shiv Chhatrapati Sports Complex, Pune

2 December
9:00

Report

Philippines	36–129	China
Scoring by quarter: 13–33, 6–37, 8–25, 9–34
Pts: Rivera 14; Rebs: Tanaman, Jose 2 Asts: Araneta 5		Pts: Li M. 27; Rebs: Ma X.Y. 4 Asts: Sun M.X. 6

Shree Shiv Chhatrapati Sports Complex, Pune

2 December
13:00

Report

Singapore	47–72	Hong Kong
Scoring by quarter: 13–12, 10–18, 10–16, 14–26
Pts: V. Chua 9 Rebs: Lim 12; Asts: Ong 6		Pts: Wong K.Y. 19; Rebs: Destiny 13; Asts: Young 10

Shree Shiv Chhatrapati Sports Complex, Pune

2 December
17:00

India	37–95	Chinese Taipei
Scoring by quarter: 12–23, 8–17, 12–29, 5–26
Pts: Akula 12		Pts: Lin Y.T. 24

Shree Shiv Chhatrapati Sports Complex, Pune

3 December
13:00

Report

Chinese Taipei	110–30	Philippines
Scoring by quarter: 32–8, 28–2, 18–14, 32–6
Pts: Chen T.H. 33; Rebs: Huang H.T. 10; Asts: Yang J. 5		Pts: Rivera 11; Rebs: Araneta 4 Asts: Javier, Jose 2

Shree Shiv Chhatrapati Sports Complex, Pune

3 December
17:00

Report

Hong Kong	49–74	India
Scoring by quarter: 11–15, 10–16, 20–25, 8–18
Pts: Chau H.T. 13; Rebs: Young 7 Asts: Young 8		Pts: Rajguru, Limaye 16; Rebs: Limaye 19; Asts: Akula, Limaye 6

Shree Shiv Chhatrapati Sports Complex, Pune

3 December
19:00

Report

China	115–15	Singapore
Scoring by quarter: 35–2, 24–6, 30–4, 26–3
Pts: Sun M.X., Li M. 24; Rebs: Li M. 9 Asts: Cui H.Y. 8		Pts: V. Chua, Chua T.Y. 5 Rebs: Roslan 4 Asts: Chua T.Y., C. Ng, Roslan 1

Shree Shiv Chhatrapati Sports Complex, Pune

4 December
15:00

Report

Philippines	63–55	Hong Kong
Scoring by quarter: 14–7, 8–18, 27–6, 14–24
Pts: Rivera, Piatos 14; Rebs: Tanaman 5 Asts: Piatos 5		Pts: Wong K.Y. 15; Rebs: Wong M.S., Liu W.S., Chan W.P. 4 Asts: Young 5

Shree Shiv Chhatrapati Sports Complex, Pune

4 December
17:00

Report

India	94–45	Singapore
Scoring by quarter: 23–13, 19–8, 20–13, 32–11
Pts: Rajguru 25; Rebs: Loganathan 12; Asts: Akula 8		Pts: Han 10; Rebs: Eng 7 Asts: Ong 3

Shree Shiv Chhatrapati Sports Complex, Pune

4 December
19:00

Report

Chinese Taipei	54–82	China
Scoring by quarter: 16–15, 17–25, 5–18, 16–24
Pts: Lin Y.T., Cheng I.H. 10; Rebs: Lin Y.T., Wang W.L. 4 Asts: Wang W.L. 5		Pts: Ma X.Y. 16; Rebs: Yu D. 23; Asts: Cui H.Y., Yu D. 5

Shree Shiv Chhatrapati Sports Complex, Pune

=== Group B ===
Team	Pld	W	L	PF	PA	PD	Pts
Japan	5	5	0	564	183	+382	10
South Korea	5	4	1	405	303	+102	9
Thailand	5	3	2	303	334	−31	8
Malaysia	5	2	3	310	347	−37	7
Kazakhstan	5	1	4	281	388	−107	6
Sri Lanka	5	0	5	131	440	−309	5

30 November
9:00

Report

South Korea	78–58	Thailand
Scoring by quarter: 20–14, 14–10, 19–14, 25–20
Pts: Jeong Y.J. 16; Rebs: Kim E.J., Choi E.S. 1 Asts: 0		Pts: Arjsri 18; Rebs: Chalieolerdaumpon, Arjsri 1 Asts: 0

Shree Shiv Chhatrapati Sports Complex, Pune

30 November
13:00

Japan	120–9	Sri Lanka
Scoring by quarter: 38–4, 26–1, 25–4, 31–0
Pts: Sugawara 25		Pts: Premdasa 7

Shree Shiv Chhatrapati Sports Complex, Pune

30 November
20:00

Report

Malaysia	78–54	Kazakhstan
Scoring by quarter: 21–19, 25–10, 13–12, 19–13
Pts: Ooi P.Y. 24; Rebs: 0 Asts: Chong Y.Y. 3		Pts: Yakovitskaya 13; Rebs: Petukhova 2 Asts: Petukhova, Tuleubayeva, Rybalko 1

Shree Shiv Chhatrapati Sports Complex, Pune

1 December
13:00

Report

Kazakhstan	53–69	South Korea
Scoring by quarter: 11–14, 11–24, 14–15, 17–16
Pts: Popova 26; Rebs: Popova 6 Asts: 0		Pts: Kim E.J. 20; Rebs: Kang K.L. 4 Asts: Choi E.S. 1

Shree Shiv Chhatrapati Sports Complex, Pune

1 December
15:00

Report

Thailand	49–103	Japan
Scoring by quarter: 4–27, 13–21, 14–29, 18–26
Pts: Sawatong 20; Rebs: Sawatong 4 Asts: Butboontom, Sapmee 1		Pts: Izumita 15; Rebs: Ikeya 3 Asts: Hill 3

Shree Shiv Chhatrapati Sports Complex, Pune

1 December
19:00

Sri Lanka	25–80	Malaysia
Scoring by quarter: 4–27, 11–20, 4–21, 9–12
Pts: Jayakodyarachchilage 12		Pts: Yap F.Y. 14

Shree Shiv Chhatrapati Sports Complex, Pune

2 December
11:00

Kazakhstan	44–125	Japan
Scoring by quarter: 7–27, 8–29, 20–37, 9–32
Pts: Rybalko 10		Pts: Sugawara 21

Shree Shiv Chhatrapati Sports Complex, Pune

2 December
15:00

Malaysia	60–88	South Korea
Scoring by quarter: 21–22, 14–24, 10–19, 15–23
Pts: Yap F.Y. 20		Pts: Kang K.L. 18

Shree Shiv Chhatrapati Sports Complex, Pune

2 December
19:00

Report

Sri Lanka	29–57	Thailand
Scoring by quarter: 5–14, 12–12, 2–20, 10–11
Pts: Rajapakse 18; Rebs: Rajapakse 18; Asts: Premdasa 3		Pts: Sapmee 13; Rebs: Sapmee 14; Asts: Chalieolerdaumpon 5

Shree Shiv Chhatrapati Sports Complex, Pune

3 December
9:00

Report

Japan	112–26	Malaysia
Scoring by quarter: 38–5, 22–2, 35–13, 17–6
Pts: Miyazawa, Chikahira 15; Rebs: Ikeya, Onuma 3 Asts: Takeda, Nagaoka 6		Pts: Low 7 Rebs: Chong Y.Y., Yap F.Y. 2 Asts: Chong Y.Y., Low 2

Shree Shiv Chhatrapati Sports Complex, Pune

3 December
11:00

Report

South Korea	113–26	Sri Lanka
Scoring by quarter: 36–8, 26–10, 31–3, 20–5
Pts: Park D.J. 19; Rebs: Kang K.L. 6 Asts: Kang K.L. 10		Pts: Jayakodyarachchilage 12; Rebs: De Soysa, Dona 4 Asts: Premdasa 3

Shree Shiv Chhatrapati Sports Complex, Pune

3 December
15:00

Report

Thailand	71–60	Kazakhstan
Scoring by quarter: 18–7, 22–12, 16–12, 15–29
Pts: Maihom 23; Rebs: Sapmee, Arjsri 3 Asts: Sawatong 6		Pts: Popova 13; Rebs: Popova, Tuleubayeva 2 Asts: Popova 4

Shree Shiv Chhatrapati Sports Complex, Pune

4 December
9:00

Report

Kazakhstan	70–42	Sri Lanka
Scoring by quarter: 18–6, 14–13, 23–14, 15–9
Pts: Li 16; Rebs: Tuleubayeva 3 Asts: Kanaikina, Popova 5		Pts: Rajapakse 25; Rebs: Rajapakse 6 Asts: Premdasa 4

Shree Shiv Chhatrapati Sports Complex, Pune

4 December
11:00

Report

Malaysia	66–68	Thailand
Scoring by quarter: 15–15, 11–15, 18–22, 22–16
Pts: Yap F.Y. 27; Rebs: Ng S.Y. 10; Asts: Lee J.R. 7		Pts: Maihom 23; Rebs: Maihom, Arjsri 9 Asts: Sawangkaew, Sawatong, Maihom 6

Shree Shiv Chhatrapati Sports Complex, Pune

4 December
13:00

Report

Japan	104–54	South Korea
Scoring by quarter: 29–14, 20–11, 28–12, 27–17
Pts: Nagaoka 20; Rebs: Nagaoka 11; Asts: Hill 7		Pts: Noh H.J. 9 Rebs: Park D.J., Jeon B.M. 5 Asts: Kang K.L. 3

Shree Shiv Chhatrapati Sports Complex, Pune

== Classification 5th–12th ==
=== 11th place ===
5 December
10:00

Report

Singapore	57–46	Sri Lanka
Scoring by quarter: 17–10, 15–15, 14–8, 11–13
Pts: Tok H.M. 18; Rebs: Han 7 Asts: Ong, C. Ng 3		Pts: Rajapakse 16; Rebs: Rajapakse 5 Asts: De Soysa 2

Shree Shiv Chhatrapati Sports Complex, Pune

=== 9th place ===
5 December
12:00

Report

Hong Kong	65–64	Kazakhstan
Scoring by quarter: 22–15, 8–18, 19–20, 16–11
Pts: Wong K.Y. 19; Rebs: Chau H.T., Chan W.P. 8 Asts: Chau H.T. 4		Pts: Kanaikina 14; Rebs: Bogomazova 4 Asts: Omelchenko 4

Shree Shiv Chhatrapati Sports Complex, Pune

=== 7th place ===
6 December
10:00

Report

Philippines	65–54	Malaysia
Scoring by quarter: 15–10, 14–14, 15–11, 21–19
Pts: Rivera 14; Rebs: Rivera 5 Asts: Tanaman 5		Pts: Ng S.Y. 15; Rebs: Yap F.Y. 11; Asts: Chong Y.Y. 4

Shree Shiv Chhatrapati Sports Complex, Pune

=== 5th place ===
6 December
12:00

Report

India	64–79	Thailand
Scoring by quarter: 10–10, 22–22, 14–26, 18–21
Pts: Rajguru 16; Rebs: Navaneetha 15; Asts: Rajguru 5		Pts: Maihom 22; Rebs: Maihom, Arjsri 11; Asts: Maihom 9

Shree Shiv Chhatrapati Sports Complex, Pune

== Final round ==
Semifinals
5 December
Japan	79
Chinese Taipei	49
5 December
China	110
South Korea	42

Final
6 December
Japan	86
China	99
3rd place
6 December
Chinese Taipei	66
South Korea	63

=== Semifinals ===
5 December
14:00

Report

Japan	79–49	Chinese Taipei
Scoring by quarter: 19–16, 18–12, 19–10, 23–11
Pts: Chikahira 14; Rebs: Fujioka, Nagaoka 9 Asts: Fujioka 12		Pts: Huang H.T. 10; Rebs: Huang H.T., Chang C.F., Yang J. 8 Asts: Lin Y.T. 3

Shree Shiv Chhatrapati Sports Complex, Pune

5 December
16:00

Report

China	110–42	South Korea
Scoring by quarter: 26–13, 27–13, 31–7, 26–9
Pts: Yu D. 21; Rebs: Yu D. 11; Asts: Shen Y. 8		Pts: Jeong Y.J. 9 Rebs: Jeong Y.J., Noh H.J. 6 Asts: Kang K.L. 4

Shree Shiv Chhatrapati Sports Complex, Pune

=== 3rd place ===
6 December
14:00

Report

Chinese Taipei	66–63	South Korea
Scoring by quarter: 15–11, 20–28, 11–13, 20–11
Pts: Lin Y.T. 19; Rebs: Huang H.T. 9 Asts: Chang C.F. 5		Pts: Park D.J. 19; Rebs: Park D.J., Choi E.S. 8 Asts: Kim E.J. 8

Shree Shiv Chhatrapati Sports Complex, Pune

=== Final ===
6 December
16:00

Report

Japan	86–99	China
Scoring by quarter: 22–22, 23–23, 25–26, 16–28
Pts: Hill 28; Rebs: Nagaoka, Miyazawa 7 Asts: Fujioka 8		Pts: Li M. 26; Rebs: Yu D. 4 Asts: Shen Y. 9

Shree Shiv Chhatrapati Sports Complex, Pune

== Final standing ==
Qualified for the 2010 FIBA Under-17 World Championship for Women

Rank	Team	Record
1st place, gold medalist(s)	China	7–0
2nd place, silver medalist(s)	Japan	6–1
3rd place, bronze medalist(s)	Chinese Taipei	6–1
4	South Korea	5–2
5	Thailand	4–2
6	India	3–3
7	Philippines	3–3
8	Malaysia	2–4
9	Hong Kong	2–4
10	Kazakhstan	1–5
11	Singapore	1–5
12	Sri Lanka	0–6

== Awards ==
2009 Asian Under-16 champions

China
First title
