= 2026 FIBA U18 Women's Asia Cup =

27th edition of the biennial competition

27th FIBA Under-18 Women's Asian Basketball Championship

Tournament details
- Host country: Malaysia (Division A); Thailand (Division B)
- Cities: Seremban (Division A); Bangkok (Division B)
- Dates: 4−10 October (Division A); 13−19 July (Division B)
- Teams: 16 (from 1 confederation)

Final positions
- Champions: Australia (3rd title)
- Runners-up: Japan
- Third place: China
- Fourth place: South Korea

The 2026 FIBA U18 Women's Asia Cup was an international under-18 women's basketball competition held in the form of two separate tournaments at two separate locations: Division A was held in Seremban, Malaysia from 4 to 10 October 2026, while Division B was held in Bangkok, Thailand from 13 to 19 July 2026. This was the 27th edition of the biennial FIBA U18 Women's Asia Cup, previously known as the FIBA U18 Women's Asian Championship. The top four teams qualified for and will represent FIBA Asia at the 2027 FIBA Under-19 Women's Basketball World Cup which will be held in China, joining the automatically qualified hosts China.

== Hosts selection ==
On 12 December 2025, it was confirmed by FIBA Asia Regional Office that Malaysia will host Division A, while Division B is set to be played in Thailand.

== Qualified teams ==
For Division A:

- Top seven teams of the 2024 FIBA U18 Women's Asian Championship Division A:
  - Australia
  - China
  - Japan
  - South Korea
  - New Zealand
  - Chinese Taipei
  - Malaysia
- Winner of the 2024 FIBA U18 Women's Asian Championship Division B:
  - Philippines

For Division B:

- The host country:
  - Thailand
- One team from the CABA qualifiers:
  - Kazakhstan
- One team from the SABA qualifiers:
  - India
- One team from the SEABA qualifiers:
  - Indonesia
- Third- and Fourth-placed teams from the 2025 FIBA U17 Women's Oceania Cup:
  - Cook Islands
  - Samoa
- Additional two teams:
  - Lebanon
  - Oman

== Competition format ==
The sixteen participating teams were divided into two divisions, Division A and Division B of eight teams each.

In each division, the eight participating teams were drawn into two groups (A and B) of four teams each.

Each team played against all the other teams within its own group. The final stage standings will be established after the games for a total of twelve are all played.

Teams that finished first in each group advanced to the semifinal round, awaiting the winners of the qualification to semifinals round.

Teams that finished second and third in each group faced the third-placed and second-placed team, respectively, in the other group within its own division, in the qualification-to-semifinals round.

Winners of the qualification-to-semifinals round faced the directly qualified semifinalists in the semifinal round, while losers were dropped to the fifth place game.

Teams that finished fourth in their groups within their division played against each other in the seventh place game.

For Division A, all semifinalists qualified to the 2027 FIBA U19 Women's Basketball World Cup, along with the winner of the fifth place game (as semifinalists China already qualified for the 2027 FIBA U19 Women's Basketball World Cup as hosts).

The Division B champions will be promoted to Division A for the next championship, replacing the eighth-placed team in Division A that will be relegated to Division B for the next championship.

== Divisions ==
The December 2025 FIBA Girls' World Rankings are shown in parentheses.

Division A	Division B
Australia (4); Japan (9); China (18); New Zealand (20); South Korea (23); Chinese Taipei (24); Philippines (45); Malaysia (57)	Indonesia (51); Samoa (60); Cook Islands (62); India (63); Thailand (79); Lebanon (82); Kazakhstan (NR); Oman (NR)

== Division A ==
2026 FIBA U18 Women's Asia Cup Division A
27th FIBA Under-18 Women's Asian Basketball Championship

Tournament details
- Host country: Malaysia
- City: Seremban
- Dates: 4−10 October
- Teams: 8 (from 1 confederation)
- Venue: 1 (in 1 host city)

Final positions
- Champions: Australia (3rd title)
- Runners-up: Japan
- Third place: China

Tournament statistics
- MVP: (Japan) Miya Takeuchi
- Top scorer: (South Korea) Lim Yeonseo (20.0)
- Top rebounds: (South Korea) Kim Damhee (9.7)
- Top assists: (China) Hu Ruiyan (4.3)
- PPG (Team): China (92.7)
- RPG (Team): Australia (54.2)
- APG (Team): China (23.3)

Official website
- www.fiba.basketball

All times are local (Malaysian Standard Time; UTC+08:00).

=== Group phase ===
==== Group A ====
Pos	Team	Pld	W	L	PF	PA	PD	Pts	Qualification
1	Australia	3	3	0	293	137	+156	6	Semifinals
2	South Korea	3	2	1	216	233	−17	5	Qualifying round
3	Philippines	3	1	2	186	252	−66	4	Qualifying round
4	New Zealand	3	0	3	169	242	−73	3	Seventh place game

Source: FIBA
Rules for classification: (1) Tournament points, (2) Head-to-head tournament points, (3) Head-to-head goal average, (4) Overall goal average, (5) Drawing of lots

4 October 2026
11:30

Report
Box Score

Australia	102–47	Philippines
Scoring by quarter: 30−8, 30−12, 19−16, 23−11
Pts: Richardson 18; Rebs: Mapp 12; Asts: Smith 4		Pts: Reyes, Rosano 10; Rebs: Curley, Oñate 4 Asts: Rosano 4

Arena Seremban, Seremban
Attendance: 40
Referees: Fang Wenxuan (CHN), Miki Ogata (JPN), Yap Khar Yin (MAS)

4 October 2026
14:00

Report
Box Score

South Korea	74–71	New Zealand
Scoring by quarter: 19−15, 24−16, 20−16, 11−24
Pts: Lim 31; Rebs: Kim 19; Asts: Kim 7		Pts: Ashton 15; Rebs: Ashton 17; Asts: McClenaghan 4

Arena Seremban, Seremban
Attendance: 40
Referees: Mahsa Kargari (IRI), Clara Monica (INA), Chen Pei Tzu (TPE)

5 October 2026
11:30

Report
Box Score

New Zealand	34–99	Australia
Scoring by quarter: 7−29, 13−22, 2−19, 12−29
Pts: Miringaorangi 7 Rebs: Vukona 4 Asts: Miringaorangi 2		Pts: Ryan 18; Rebs: Mapp 10; Asts: Crase 5

Arena Seremban, Seremban
Attendance: 60
Referees: Miki Ogata (JPN), Moneera Alhashash (KUW), Clara Monica (INA)

5 October 2026
14:00

Report
Box Score

Philippines	70–86	South Korea
Scoring by quarter: 17−18, 15−30, 21−18, 17−20
Pts: Perez 21; Rebs: Olmos 12; Asts: Reyes 3		Pts: Lim 30; Rebs: Kim 9 Asts: Lim 6

Arena Seremban, Seremban
Attendance: 80
Referees: Mahsa Kargari (IRI), Chen Pei Tzu (TPE), Hum Zhung Liang (MAS)

6 October 2026
11:30

Report
Box Score

Australia	92–56	South Korea
Scoring by quarter: 34−9, 25−10, 16−16, 17−21
Pts: Ryan 19; Rebs: Ryan 10; Asts: 4 players 3		Pts: Lim 16; Rebs: Lee Su.H., Park 4 Asts: Lee Su.H. 4

Arena Seremban, Seremban
Attendance: 50
Referees: Clara Monica (INA), Hum Zhung Liang (MAS), Moneera Alhashash (KUW)

6 October 2026
14:00

Report
Box Score

New Zealand	64–69	Philippines
Scoring by quarter: 16−9, 23−21, 4−20, 21−19
Pts: Miringaorangi 17; Rebs: Smith 9 Asts: Miringaorangi, McClenaghan 3		Pts: Rosano 23; Rebs: Curley 10; Asts: 4 players 1

Arena Seremban, Seremban
Attendance: 100
Referees: Watcharin Padungratchadakit (THA), Fang Wenxuan (CHN), Kian Hua Tan (MAS)

==== Group B ====
Pos	Team	Pld	W	L	PF	PA	PD	Pts	Qualification
1	Japan	3	3	0	292	152	+140	6	Semifinals
2	China	3	2	1	279	149	+130	5	Qualifying round
3	Chinese Taipei	3	1	2	207	214	−7	4	Qualifying round
4	Malaysia (H)	3	0	3	95	358	−263	3	Seventh place game

Source: FIBA
Rules for classification: (1) Tournament points, (2) Head-to-head tournament points, (3) Head-to-head goal average, (4) Overall goal average, (5) Drawing of lots
(H) Hosts

4 October 2026
16:30

Report
Box Score

Japan	83–55	Chinese Taipei
Scoring by quarter: 20−21, 12−13, 25−10, 26−11
Pts: Takeuchi 14; Rebs: Hosozawa 8 Asts: Yamamoto, Takeuchi 3		Pts: A. Chang 11; Rebs: A. Chang 7 Asts: A. Chang 5

Arena Seremban, Seremban
Attendance: 30
Referees: Watcharin Padungratchadakit (THA), Lee Donghyeon (KOR), Calia Hanks (AUS)

4 October 2026
19:00

Report
Box Score

China	116–30	Malaysia
Scoring by quarter: 25−8, 35−4, 38−8, 18−10
Pts: Sun H.Y. 22; Rebs: He 10; Asts: Yang 6		Pts: Voo 9 Rebs: Ea Cheem 5 Asts: Chen 2

Arena Seremban, Seremban
Attendance: 75
Referees: Kim Bohui (KOR), Janine Nicandro (PHI), Aimee Jo Clark (NZL)

5 October 2026
16:30

Report
Box Score

Chinese Taipei	46–95	China
Scoring by quarter: 13−20, 17−21, 5−35, 11−19
Pts: Su 8 Rebs: Hsu 7 Asts: Su 4		Pts: Sun R.Y. 18; Rebs: Sun H.Y. 11; Asts: Hu 6

Arena Seremban, Seremban
Attendance: 50
Referees: Janine Nicandro (PHI), Kim Bohui (KOR), Michelle Tsen (SGP)

5 October 2026
19:00

Report
Box Score

Malaysia	29–136	Japan
Scoring by quarter: 5−40, 6−33, 15−27, 3−36
Pts: Teng 6 Rebs: Te 6 Asts: Chen, Long 2		Pts: Koike 25; Rebs: 4 players 7 Asts: Otsuki 6

Arena Seremban, Seremban
Attendance: 75
Referees: Watcharin Padungratchadakit (THA), Calia Hanks (AUS), Sabuj Md. Miha (BAN)

6 October 2026
16:30

Report
Box Score

China	68–73	Japan
Scoring by quarter: 20−24, 12−8, 21−23, 15−18
Pts: Li 16; Rebs: Rao, Sun H.Y. 8 Asts: Chen, Sun R.Y. 3		Pts: Takeuchi 16; Rebs: Mizubayashi 6 Asts: Takeuchi 5

Arena Seremban, Seremban
Attendance: 200
Referees: Mahsa Kargari (IRI), Aimee Jo Clark (NZL), Lee Donghyeon (KOR)

6 October 2026
19:00

Report
Box Score

Chinese Taipei	106–36	Malaysia
Scoring by quarter: 24−7, 34−12, 31−9, 17−8
Pts: Wu H.L., Huang 17; Rebs: Huang 11; Asts: 4 players 4		Pts: Ea Cheem 7 Rebs: Ea Cheem 8 Asts: Chen 3

Arena Seremban, Seremban
Attendance: 60
Referees: Calia Hanks (AUS), Michelle Tsen (SGP), Janine Nicandro (PHI)

=== Knockout round ===
==== Brackets ====
Qualification to Semifinals
8 October
China	112
Philippines	49
8 October
South Korea	67
Chinese Taipei	64

Semifinals
9 October
Australia	78
China	59
9 October
Japan	80
South Korea	43

Final
10 October
Australia	83
Japan	82
Third place game
10 October
China	106
South Korea	69

Fifth place game
9 October
Chinese Taipei	86
Philippines	55

Seventh place game
8 October
New Zealand	78
Malaysia	40

==== Seventh place game ====
8 October 2026
14:00

Report
Box Score

New Zealand	78–40	Malaysia
Scoring by quarter: 22−14, 18−7, 22−11, 16−8
Pts: Eliadis 13; Rebs: Ashton 12; Asts: McClenaghan 4		Pts: Teo 8 Rebs: Ea Cheem 7 Asts: Ting 3

Arena Seremban, Seremban
Attendance: 55
Referees: Kim Bohui (KOR), Chen Pei Tzu (TPE), Michelle Tsen (SGP)

==== Qualification to Semifinals ====
8 October 2026
16:30

Report
Box Score

South Korea	67–64	Chinese Taipei
Scoring by quarter: 24−10, 15−15, 19−20, 9−19
Pts: Lim 23; Rebs: Kim 18; Asts: Kim 3		Pts: Lim 14; Rebs: Huan 10; Asts: Gao, Wu 4

Arena Seremban, Seremban
Attendance: 50
Referees: Mahsa Kargari (IRI), Watcharin Padungratchadakit (THA), Yap Khar Yin (MAS)

8 October 2026
19:00

Report
Box Score

China	112–49	Philippines
Scoring by quarter: 28−14, 22−15, 32−10, 30−10
Pts: Li 21; Rebs: Yao 7 Asts: Hu, Sun R.Y 6		Pts: Curley 17; Rebs: Curley 5 Asts: Perez 3

Arena Seremban, Seremban
Attendance: 60
Referees: Miki Ogata (JPN), Clara Monica (INA), Aimee Jo Clark (NZL)

==== Fifth place game ====
9 October 2026
14:00

Report
Box Score

Chinese Taipei	86–55	Philippines
Scoring by quarter: 28−15, 21−16, 17−9, 20−15
Pts: Chen 12; Rebs: Huang 8 Asts: Chen 6		Pts: Curley 15; Rebs: Curley 9 Asts: Curley, Badajos 2

Arena Seremban, Seremban
Attendance: 23
Referees: Lee Donghyeon (KOR), Sabuj Md. Miha (BAN), Calia Hanks (AUS)

==== Semifinals ====
9 October 2026
16:30

Report
Box Score

Japan	80–43	South Korea
Scoring by quarter: 20−10, 20−14, 21−13, 19−6
Pts: Koike 15; Rebs: Mizubayashi 9 Asts: Yamamoto 4		Pts: Cho H.W. 14; Rebs: Kim 4 Asts: Lim 2

Arena Seremban, Seremban
Attendance: 78
Referees: Watcharin Padungratchadakit (THA), Clara Monica (INA), Moneera Alhashash (KUW)

9 October 2026
19:00

Report
Box Score

Australia	78–59	China
Scoring by quarter: 31−9, 12−19, 16−18, 19−13
Pts: Smith 22; Rebs: Manyok 16; Asts: Olechnowicz 5		Pts: He 22; Rebs: Zhao 9 Asts: Yao 4

Arena Seremban, Seremban
Attendance: 100
Referees: Mahsa Kargari (IRI), Janine Nicandro (PHI), Yap Khar Yin (MAS)

==== Third place game ====
10 October 2026
16:00

Report
Box Score

China	106–69	South Korea
Scoring by quarter: 30−23, 21−20, 29−16, 26−10
Pts: Li 35; Rebs: 3 players 6 Asts: Li, Hu 10		Pts: Lim 16; Rebs: Kim, Lim 5 Asts: Lim 6

Arena Seremban, Seremban
Attendance: 120
Referees: Calia Hanks (AUS), Michelle Tsen (SGP), Hum Zhung Liang (MAS)

==== Final ====
10 October 2026
19:00

Report
Box Score

Australia	83–82	Japan
Scoring by quarter: 19−23, 22−14, 21−19, 21−26
Pts: Ryan 17; Rebs: Ryan 17; Asts: Bobongie 6		Pts: Takeuchi 25; Rebs: Hosozawa 7 Asts: Takeuchi 6

Arena Seremban, Seremban
Attendance: 1123
Referees: Mahsa Kargari (IRI), Fang Wenxuan (CHN), Janine Nicandro (PHI)

== Division B ==
2026 FIBA U18 Women's Asia Cup Division B
4th edition of Division B of FIBA U18 Women's Asia Cup

Tournament details
- Host country: Thailand
- City: Bangkok
- Dates: 13−19 July
- Teams: 8 (from 1 confederation)
- Venue: 1 (in 1 host city)

Final positions
- Champions: Lebanon (1st title)
- Runners-up: Kazakhstan
- Third place: Indonesia

Tournament statistics
- Top scorer: (Lebanon) Lara Al Nakib (18.6)
- Top rebounds: (Kazakhstan) Milana Krutevich (11.8)
- Top assists: (Thailand) Sarah Tuukkanen (5.8)
- PPG (Team): Indonesia (80.7)
- RPG (Team): Cook Islands (60.0)
- APG (Team): Indonesia (25.2)

Official website
- www.fiba.basketball

All times are local (Indochina Time; UTC+07:00).

=== Group phase ===
==== Group A ====
Pos	Team	Pld	W	L	PF	PA	PD	Pts	Qualification
1	India	3	3	0	284	125	+159	6	Semifinals
2	Indonesia	3	2	1	266	127	+139	5	Qualifying round
3	Thailand (H)	3	1	2	215	219	−4	4	Qualifying round
4	Oman	3	0	3	43	337	−294	3	Seventh place game

Source: FIBA
Rules for classification: (1) Tournament points, (2) Head-to-head tournament points, (3) Head-to-head goal average, (4) Overall goal average, (5) Drawing of lots
(H) Hosts

13 July 2026
16:00

Report

Indonesia	127–6	Oman
Scoring by quarter: 36−1, 34−2, 24−3, 33−0
Pts: Blessed, Rahiesa 18; Rebs: Valerie 14; Asts: Blessed 8		Pts: Battash 3 Rebs: Al Said 7 Asts: Al Kharusi 1

Nimibutr Stadium, Bangkok
Referees: Lee Ji Youn (KOR), Taylor Folker (AUS), Jennifer Ammoury (LBN)

13 July 2026
18:30

Report

India	106–62	Thailand
Scoring by quarter: 26−14, 30−12, 28−4, 22−32
Pts: Jonnalagadda 17; Rebs: Tarun 5 Asts: Birudavolu 8		Pts: Tojaruen 12; Rebs: Tuukkanen, Chanasimma 6 Asts: Tuukkanen 10

Nimibutr Stadium, Bangkok
Referees: Mahsa Kargari (IRI), Madison Crowley-Long (AUS), Aidyn Zhapar (KAZ)

14 July 2026
16:00

Report

Oman	17–99	India
Scoring by quarter: 5−28, 5−31, 2−19, 5−21
Pts: 3 players 3 Rebs: 4 players 4 Asts: Al Sulaimi 2		Pts: Tarun 25; Rebs: Sadhana 14; Asts: Birudavolu 8

Nimibutr Stadium, Bangkok
Referees: Madison Crowley-Long (AUS), Chitchanok Srisawat (THA), Sabud Md. Miha (BAN)

14 July 2026
18:30

Report

Thailand	42–93	Indonesia
Scoring by quarter: 7−24, 17−25, 10−20, 8−24
Pts: Tojaruen, Tuukkanen 11; Rebs: Tojaruen 7 Asts: Tojaruen, Tuukkanen 3		Pts: Blessed 20; Rebs: Valerie 9 Asts: Blessed, Chayyara 5

Nimibutr Stadium, Bangkok
Referees: Mandy Sing Tong Ngieng (MAS), Lien Wan-Chen (TPE), Taylor Folker (AUS)

15 July 2026
16:00

Report

Indonesia	46–79	India
Scoring by quarter: 18−22, 8−11, 9−19, 11−27
Pts: Giovanni 10; Rebs: Cung 7 Asts: Welly 5		Pts: Jonnalagadda, Sharma 15; Rebs: Jonnalagadda 8 Asts: Pardeshi 9

Nimibutr Stadium, Bangkok
Referees: Mahsa Kargari (IRI), Jennifer Ammoury (LBN), Aidyn Zhapar (KAZ)

15 July 2026
18:30

Report

Thailand	111–20	Oman
Scoring by quarter: 32–0, 20–5, 31–2, 28–13
Pts: Somwan 21; Rebs: Sodtho 11; Asts: Rueangsiri 11		Pts: Al Maskari 7 Rebs: Battash, Al Said 7 Asts: Battash 3

Nimibutr Stadium, Bangkok
Referees: Taylor Folker (AUS), Sabud Md. Miha (BAN), Arundhaty Banerjee (IND)

==== Group B ====
Pos	Team	Pld	W	L	PF	PA	PD	Pts	Qualification
1	Lebanon	3	3	0	204	162	+42	6	Semifinals
2	Kazakhstan	3	2	1	220	173	+47	5	Qualifying round
3	Samoa	3	1	2	171	227	−56	4	Qualifying round
4	Cook Islands	3	0	3	154	187	−33	3	Seventh place game

Source: FIBA
Rules for classification: (1) Tournament points, (2) Head-to-head tournament points, (3) Head-to-head goal average, (4) Overall goal average, (5) Drawing of lots

13 July 2026
11:00

Report

Samoa	59–88	Kazakhstan
Scoring by quarter: 17−23, 20−20, 13−18, 9−27
Pts: Lee-Hang 20; Rebs: Matatia 11; Asts: M. Auva'a 5		Pts: Dymovskikh 20; Rebs: Krutevich 13; Asts: Bogashyova 5

Nimibutr Stadium, Bangkok
Referees: Lien Wan-Chen (TPE), Watcharin Padungratchadakit (THA), Clara Monica (INA)

13 July 2026
13:30

Report

Cook Islands	51–54	Lebanon
Scoring by quarter: 12−13, 13−10, 7−21, 19−10
Pts: Iotua, Kata 11; Rebs: Piri 12; Asts: Iotua, Kata, Munokoa 3		Pts: Al Nakib 22; Rebs: Hoteit 11; Asts: Al Nakib 5

Nimibutr Stadium, Bangkok
Referees: Mandy Sing Tong Ngieng (MAS), Chitchanok Srisawat (THA), Arundhaty Banerjee (IND)

14 July 2026
11:00

Report

Lebanon	84–52	Samoa
Scoring by quarter: 24−8, 13−20, 27−18, 20−8
Pts: Al Nakib 14; Rebs: Kamaz 14; Asts: Hoteit 7		Pts: M. Auva'a, Lee-Hang 11; Rebs: Lee-Hang 7 Asts: Mareta-Manu, Kiriau-Paulo 4

Nimibutr Stadium, Bangkok
Referees: Lee Ji Youn (KOR), Via Diah Rohmana (INA), Nattapong Jontapa (THA)

14 July 2026
13:30

Report

Kazakhstan	73–48	Cook Islands
Scoring by quarter: 16−10, 31−15, 15−12, 11−11
Pts: Sharipova 17; Rebs: Dymovskikh 12; Asts: Ybray 5		Pts: Kata 20; Rebs: Karika 11; Asts: Marsters, John 2

Nimibutr Stadium, Bangkok
Referees: Mahsa Kargari (IRI), Clara Monica (INA), Wafa Al Sumri (OMA)

15 July 2026
11:00

Report

Samoa	60–55	Cook Islands
Scoring by quarter: 16−25, 17−11, 11−3, 16−16
Pts: M. Auva'a 20; Rebs: Mareta-Manu 10; Asts: Mareta-Manu 4		Pts: Iotua 24; Rebs: Karika 11; Asts: Kata 7

Nimibutr Stadium, Bangkok
Referees: Lien Wan-Chen (TPE), Wafa Al Sumri (OMA), Watcharin Padungratchadakit (THA)

15 July 2026
13:30

Report

Lebanon	66–59	Kazakhstan
Scoring by quarter: 15−15, 23−16, 10−10, 18−18
Pts: Al Nakib 28; Rebs: El Harake 13; Asts: Al Nakib 5		Pts: Shakhida 24; Rebs: Krutevich 15; Asts: Dymovskikh 4

Nimibutr Stadium, Bangkok
Referees: Lee Ji Youn (KOR), Mandy Sing Tong Ngieng (MAS), Via Diah Rohmana (INA)

=== Knockout round ===
==== Brackets ====
Qualification to Semifinals
17 July
Kazakhstan	62
Thailand	34
17 July
Indonesia	94
Samoa	49

Semifinals
18 July
India	36
Kazakhstan	60
18 July
Lebanon	77
Indonesia	54

Finals
19 July
Kazakhstan	39
Lebanon	58
Third place game
19 July
India	50
Indonesia	70

Fifth place game
18 July
Samoa	82
Thailand	73

Seventh place game
17 July
Oman	14
Cook Islands	126

==== Seventh place game ====
17 July 2026
13:30

Report

Oman	14–126	Cook Islands
Scoring by quarter: 5–33, 1–36, 2–30, 6–27
Pts: Al Said 7 Rebs: Battash 9 Asts: Battash 3		Pts: Karika 25; Rebs: Marsters 17; Asts: Marsters, Kata 9

Nimibutr Stadium, Bangkok
Referees: Jennifer Ammoury (LBN), Clara Monica (INA), Aidyn Zhapar (KAZ)

==== Qualification to Semifinals ====
17 July 2026
16:00

Report

Indonesia	94–49	Samoa
Scoring by quarter: 26−14, 24−22, 20−9, 24−4
Pts: Rahiesa, Giovanni 15; Rebs: Krisabella 9 Asts: Giovanni, Welly 6		Pts: M. Auva'a, Lee-Hang 14; Rebs: Kiriau-Paulo 9 Asts: M. Auva'a, Mareta-Manu 3

Nimibutr Stadium, Bangkok
Referees: Lee Ji Youn (KOR), Lien Wan-Chen (TPE), Chitchanok Srisawat (THA)

17 July 2026
18:30

Report

Kazakhstan	62–34	Thailand
Scoring by quarter: 25−15, 12−7, 15−5, 10−7
Pts: Krutevich 14; Rebs: Krutevich 14; Asts: Savchenko 6		Pts: Tuukkanen 7 Rebs: Trakulvera 8 Asts: Rueangsiri 3

Nimibutr Stadium, Bangkok
Referees: Mahsa Kargari (IRI), Mandy Sing Tong Ngieng (MAS), Madison Crowley-Long (AUS)

==== Fifth place game ====
18 July 2026
13:30

Report

Samoa	82–73	Thailand
Scoring by quarter: 21−10, 11−15, 30−21, 20−27
Pts: Mareta-Manu 24; Rebs: Matatia 11; Asts: M. Auva'a 4		Pts: Boonsub 14; Rebs: Klaowikorn 11; Asts: Tuukkanen 10

Nimibutr Stadium, Bangkok
Referees: Jennifer Ammoury (LBN), Via Diah Rohmana (INA), Sabud Md. Miha (BAN)

==== Semifinals ====
18 July 2026
16:00

Report

Lebanon	77–54	Indonesia
Scoring by quarter: 25−17, 13−13, 26−17, 13−7
Pts: Kamar 18; Rebs: Abou Jaoude 9 Asts: Al Nakib 8		Pts: Krisabella 15; Rebs: Valerie 9 Asts: Welly 5

Nimibutr Stadium, Bangkok
Referees: Lee Ji Youn (KOR), Mahsa Kargari (IRI), Watcharin Padungratchadakit (THA)

18 July 2026
18:30

Report

India	36–60	Kazakhstan
Scoring by quarter: 10−15, 6−10, 11−21, 9−14
Pts: Sharma 9 Rebs: Tarun 14; Asts: Subramanian, Kolisetty 2		Pts: Ybray 18; Rebs: Satzhanova 7 Asts: Ybray 4

Nimibutr Stadium, Bangkok
Referees: Mandy Sing Tong Ngieng (MAS), Lien Wan-Chen (TPE), Taylor Folker (AUS)

==== Third place game ====
19 July 2026
16:00

Report

India	50–70	Indonesia
Scoring by quarter: 11−12, 18−16, 11−24, 10−18
Pts: Birudavolu, Sharma 10; Rebs: Sharma 16; Asts: Birudavolu, Kolisetty 4		Pts: Blessed 19; Rebs: Celesta 9 Asts: Blessed, Welly 5

Nimibutr Stadium, Bangkok
Referees: Mahsa Kargari (IRI), Lien Wan-Chen (TPE), Madison Crowley-Long (AUS)

==== Final ====
19 July 2026
18:30

Report

Kazakhstan	39–58	Lebanon
Scoring by quarter: 16−16, 8−16, 6−14, 9−12
Pts: Shakhida 12; Rebs: Krutevich 14; Asts: Savchenko, Shakhida 2		Pts: Al Nakib 16; Rebs: Hoteit 11; Asts: Hoteit 6

Nimibutr Stadium, Bangkok
Referees: Lee Ji Youn (KOR), Mandy Sing Tong Ngieng (MAS), Chitchanok Srisawat (THA)

== Final standings ==
Qualified for the 2027 FIBA Under-19 Women's Basketball World Cup
Qualified for the 2027 FIBA Under-19 Women's Basketball World Cup as hosts
Relegated to Division B of the 2028 FIBA U18 Women's Asia Cup

Division A
Rank	Team	Record
1st place, gold medalist(s)	Australia	5–0
2nd place, silver medalist(s)	Japan	4–1
3rd place, bronze medalist(s)	China	4–2
4	South Korea	3–3
5	Chinese Taipei	2–3
6	Philippines	1–4
7	New Zealand	1–3
8	Malaysia	0–4

Promoted to Division A of the 2028 FIBA U18 Women's Asia Cup

Division B
Rank	Team	Record
1	Lebanon	5–0
2	Kazakhstan	4–2
3	Indonesia	4–2
4	India	3–2
5	Samoa	2–3
6	Thailand	1–4
7	Cook Islands	1–3
8	Oman	0–4

== Awards ==
2026 U18 Asia Cup champions

Australia
Third title

Most Valuable Player
(Japan) Miya Takeuchi

The awards were announced on 10 October 2026.

=== All-Tournament Team ===
- F (China) Sun Hanyun
- F (Australia) Isabel Smith
- C (Australia) Madison Ryan
- G (South Korea) Lim Yeonseo
- G (Japan) Miya Takeuchi (MVP)
