= Lebanon national basketball team =

Lebanon national basketball team can refer to:

- Lebanon men's national basketball team
  - Lebanon men's national under-19 basketball team
  - Lebanon men's national under-17 basketball team
- Lebanon women's national basketball team
  - Lebanon women's national under-18 basketball team
  - Lebanon women's national under-16 basketball team

== See also ==
- Lebanon national team
