= Vodafone Arena =

Vodafone Arena may refer to:

- John Cain Arena, in Melbourne, Australia, known as Vodafone Arena 2000–2008
- Vodafone Arena (Fiji), in Suva, constructed for the 2003 South Pacific Games
- Vodafone Park, in the Beşiktaş district of Istanbul, Turkey, known as Vodafone Arena 2016–2017
- NKT Arena Karlskrona, Sweden, formerly known as Vodafone Arena
- Al Ahly SC Stadium, in Cairo, Egypt, known as Vodafone Stadium 2026–
