= 2014 FIBA Oceania Under-18 Championship for Women =

Tournament details
- Host country: Fiji
- Dates: 1–6 December 2014
- Teams: 10
- Venue: 1 (in 1 host city)

Final positions
- Champions: Australia

Tournament statistics
- Top scorer: (Australia) Smith, (Guam) Castro (21.0)
- Top rebounds: (Fiji) Tavui (19.5)
- Top assists: (New Zealand) Leger-Walker (3.5)

Official website
- 2014 FIBA Oceania U-18 Championship for Women

The 2014 FIBA Oceania Under-18 Championship for Women was the qualifying tournament for FIBA Oceania at the 2015 FIBA Under-19 World Championship for Women. The tournament was held in Suva, Fiji from November 27 to December 6.

Australia defeated New Zealand in the finals, 98-65, while Guam edged Tahiti in the battle for Third Place, 54-48. Australia represented FIBA Oceania at the 2015 FIBA Under-19 World Championship for Women which was held in Russia.

== Standings ==
=== Group A ===
Pos	Team	Pld	W	L	PF	PA	PD	Pts	Qualification
1	Australia	4	4	0	473	55	+418	8	Advance to Semifinals
2	Guam	4	3	1	241	264	−23	7	Advance to Semifinals
3	New Caledonia	4	2	2	179	249	−70	6	Classification 5-8
4	Papua New Guinea	4	1	3	150	265	−115	5	Classification 5-8
5	American Samoa	4	0	4	95	305	−210	4	Classification 9-10

Source: Standings

1 December 2014
01:00 (UTC)

Boxscore

Australia	113–8	American Samoa
Scoring by quarter: 36-2, 27-5, 22-0, 28-1
Pts: Smith, Farrah-Seaton 18; Rebs: Maley 12; Asts: Antoniadou 10		Pts: Taufa'asau 4 Rebs: Taufa'asau 4 Asts: Naea 1

Vodafone Arena, Suva (FIJ)

1 December 2014
1:00 (UTC)

Boxscore

Guam	90–46	Papua New Guinea
Scoring by quarter: 21-6, 25-13, 19-12, 25-15
Pts: Castro 31; Rebs: San Nicolas 13; Asts: Castro 4		Pts: Kala 29; Rebs: Boino 10; Asts: N.Dobunaba 3

Vodafone Arena, Suva (FIJ)

2 December 2014
2:00 (UTC)

Boxscore

Guam	61–53	New Caledonia
Scoring by quarter: 11-8, 14-21, 21-11, 15-13
Pts: Castro 36; Rebs: Castro 19; Asts: Castro 3		Pts: Souque 13; Rebs: Souque 8 Asts: Adjouhgniope 4

Vodafone Arena, Suva (FIJ)

2 December 2014
2:00 (UTC)

Boxscore

Papua New Guinea	16–104	Australia
Scoring by quarter: 4-41, 5-31, 2-19, 5-13
Pts: Amos 7 Rebs: Amos 6 Asts: none		Pts: Skinner 18; Rebs: Maley 11; Asts: 3 players 4

Vodafone Arena, Suva (FIJ)

2 December 2014
22:00 (UTC)

Boxscore

Papua New Guinea	56–22	American Samoa
Scoring by quarter: 18-6, 10-6, 11-6, 17-4
Pts: Amos 10; Rebs: N.Dobunaba 10; Asts: B.Dobunaba 3		Pts: Taufa'asau 4 Rebs: Naea 16; Asts: Malauulu 1

Vodafone Arena, Suva (FIJ)

2 December 2014
22:00 (UTC)

Boxscore

Australia	125–22	New Caledonia
Scoring by quarter: 24-3, 35-8, 34-7, 32-4
Pts: Smith 28; Rebs: Maley 9 Asts: Farrah-Seaton 7		Pts: Souque 6 Rebs: Wayaridri 4 Asts: none

Vodafone Arena, Suva (FIJ)

3 December 2014
6:00 (UTC)

Boxscore

New Caledonia	49–32	Papua New Guinea
Scoring by quarter: 12-7, 13-3, 7-14, 17-8
Pts: Adjouhgniope 20; Rebs: Souque 11; Asts: Adjouhgniope 3		Pts: N.Dobunaba 10; Rebs: Amos 17; Asts: Boino 2

Vodafone Arena, Suva (FIJ)

3 December 2014
6:00 (UTC)

Boxscore

American Samoa	34–81	Guam
Scoring by quarter: 4-30, 10-16, 15-18, 5-17
Pts: Taufa'asau 7 Rebs: Velega 17; Asts: none		Pts: San Nicolas 24; Rebs: San Nicolas 17; Asts: Castro 3

Vodafone Arena, Suva (FIJ)

4 December 2014
1:00 (UTC)

Boxscore

American Samoa	31–55	New Caledonia
Scoring by quarter: 12-16, 5-8, 9-13, 5-18
Pts: Naea 8 Rebs: Kelemete 8 Asts: Tautolo 2		Pts: Batillat 19; Rebs: Fenuafanote 9 Asts: Wayaridri 3

Vodafone Arena, Suva (FIJ)

4 December 2014
1:00 (UTC)

Boxscore

Australia	131–9	Guam
Scoring by quarter: 31-2, 36-2, 30-4, 34-1
Pts: Smith 22; Rebs: Hellessey, Horvat 9 Asts: Horvat 7		Pts: Meno 4 Rebs: Castro 7 Asts: none

Vodafone Arena, Suva (FIJ)

=== Group B ===
Pos	Team	Pld	W	L	PF	PA	PD	Pts	Qualification
1	New Zealand	4	4	0	423	106	+317	8	Advance to Semifinals
2	Tahiti	4	3	1	215	267	−52	7	Advance to Semifinals
3	Solomon Islands	4	2	2	191	278	−87	6	Classification 5-8
4	Fiji	4	1	3	213	257	−44	5	Classification 5-8
5	Samoa	4	0	4	178	312	−134	4	Classification 9-10

Source: Standings

1 December 2014
5:00 (UTC)

Boxscore

Solomon Islands	21–108	New Zealand
Scoring by quarter: 4-19, 5-32, 8-23, 4-34
Pts: Sade, M.Van Den Heever 8 Rebs: M.Van Den Heever 9 Asts: M.Van Den Heever, N.Van Den Heever 1		Pts: Graham 19; Rebs: Wehi 12; Asts: Leger-Walker 6

Vodafone Arena, Suva (FIJ)

1 December 2014
5:00 (UTC)

Boxscore

Samoa	41–65	Fiji
Scoring by quarter: 12-16, 10-15, 7-21, 12-13
Pts: Le'Au'Anae 10; Rebs: Moke 9 Asts: 3 players 2		Pts: Kainamoli 16; Rebs: Tavui 21; Asts: Tavui 3

Vodafone Arena, Suva (FIJ)

2 December 2014
4:00 (UTC)

Boxscore

Fiji	58–63 (OT)	Solomon Islands
Scoring by quarter: 11-6, 5-17, 19-11, 15-16, Overtime: 8-13
Pts: Kainamoli 20; Rebs: Tavui 25; Asts: Kainamoli, Tawake 2		Pts: M.Van Den Heever 21; Rebs: M.Van Den Heever 11; Asts: Sade 2

Vodafone Arena, Suva (FIJ)

2 December 2014
4:00 (UTC)

Boxscore

New Zealand	104–27	Tahiti
Scoring by quarter: 30-5, 25-4, 22-12, 27-6
Pts: Toleafoa 23; Rebs: Graham 13; Asts: Renata 4		Pts: A.Tepu 9 Rebs: Vaiho 10; Asts: A.Tepu, Villant 1

Vodafone Arena, Suva (FIJ)

3 December 2014
0:00 (UTC)

Boxscore

New Zealand	120–28	Samoa
Scoring by quarter: 25-2, 31-11, 30-5, 34-10
Pts: Renata 26; Rebs: Poletti 10; Asts: Leger-Walker 6		Pts: Pau 10; Rebs: Le'Au'Anae 8 Asts: Pau, Autufuga 2

Vodafone Arena, Suva (FIJ)

3 December 2014
0:00

Boxscore

Solomon Islands	47–59	Tahiti
Scoring by quarter: 10-13, 17-18, 8-12, 12-16
Pts: N.Van Den Heever 15; Rebs: M.Van Den Heever 13; Asts: M.Van Den Heever 3		Pts: A.Tepu 14; Rebs: Vaiho, Tehoiri 12; Asts: A.Tepu, Villant 3

Vodafone Arena, Suva (FIJ)

3 December 2014
8:00 (UTC)

Boxscore

Tahiti	62–60	Fiji
Scoring by quarter: 17-19, 11-13, 19-11, 15-17
Pts: A.Tepu 18; Rebs: Tehoiri 7 Asts: 3 players 3		Pts: Tavui 19; Rebs: Tavui 18; Asts: Kainamoli, Koroi 1

Vodafone Arena, Suva (FIJ)

3 December 2014
8:00 (UTC)

Boxscore

Samoa	53–60	Solomon Islands
Scoring by quarter: 13-9, 14-20, 12-15, 14-16
Pts: Le'Au'Anae 19; Rebs: Moke 12; Asts: Kelsall 2		Pts: Sade 21; Rebs: M.Van Den Heever 18; Asts: M.Van Den Heever 8

Vodafone Arena, Suva (FIJ)

4 December 2014
3:00 (UTC)

Boxscore

Tahiti	67–56	Samoa
Scoring by quarter: 14-9, 10-10, 28-13, 15-24
Pts: Tehoiri 18; Rebs: Tehoiri 9 Asts: Villant 8		Pts: Le'Au'Anae 13; Rebs: Sio 11; Asts: Le'Au'Anae 5

Vodafone Arena, Suva (FIJ)

4 December 2014
3:00 (UTC)

Boxscore

Fiji	30–91	New Zealand
Scoring by quarter: 9-30, 7-17, 6-14, 8-30
Pts: Kainamoli 14; Rebs: Tavui 14; Asts: none		Pts: Toleafoa 16; Rebs: Wehi 8 Asts: 4 players 3

Vodafone Arena, Suva (FIJ)

== Final round ==
=== Classification 5–8 ===
5 December 2014
4:00 (UTC)

Boxscore

New Caledonia	63–53	Fiji
Scoring by quarter: 16-5, 20-17, 12-12, 15-19
Pts: Batillat 19; Rebs: Fenuafanote 10; Asts: 3 players 2		Pts: Tawake 14; Rebs: Tavui 19; Asts: Tavui 2

Vodafone Arena, Suva (FIJ)

5 December 2014
6:00 (UTC)

Boxscore

Solomon Islands	47–52	Papua New Guinea
Scoring by quarter: 8-12, 14-17, 14-16, 11-7
Pts: N.Van Den Heever 24; Rebs: M.Van Den Heever 12; Asts: M.Van Den Heever 4		Pts: Kairi 17; Rebs: Amos 19; Asts: Kala 4

Vodafone Arena, Suva (FIJ)

=== Semifinals ===
5 December 2014
9:00 (UTC)

Boxscore

Australia	122–13	Tahiti
Scoring by quarter: 36-2, 27-5, 29-1, 30-5
Pts: Skinner 27; Rebs: Smith, Maley 12; Asts: Horvat 5		Pts: Tehoiri 5 Rebs: A.Tepu, M.Tepu 5 Asts: A.Tepu 2

Vodafone Arena, Suva (FIJ)

5 December 2014
4:00 (UTC)

Boxscore

New Zealand	101–39	Guam
Scoring by quarter: 34-10, 21-10, 21-12, 25-7
Pts: Wilson 22; Rebs: Poletti 12; Asts: Graham 5		Pts: Castro 16; Rebs: 3 players 6 Asts: Castro, Duenas 1

Vodafone Arena, Suva (FIJ)

== Final classification games ==
=== Ninth place game ===
5 December 2014
0:00 (UTC)

Boxscore

American Samoa	36–48	Samoa
Scoring by quarter: 10-12, 10-6, 10-21, 6-9
Pts: Tautolo, Kelemete 10; Rebs: Iafeta 16; Asts: Iafeta 3		Pts: Kelsall 18; Rebs: Le'Au'Anae 10; Asts: Le'Au'Anae 5

Vodafone Arena, Suva (FIJ)

=== Seventh place game ===
5 December 2014
21:00 (UTC)

Boxscore

Fiji	87–44	Solomon Islands
Scoring by quarter: 26-12, 19-16, 25-11, 17-5
Pts: Tavui 17; Rebs: Tavui 20; Asts: Kainamoli 13		Pts: Manenariu 20; Rebs: T.Kere 7 Asts: Aefi 4

Vodafone Arena, Suva (FIJ)

=== Fifth place game ===
5 December 2014
23:00 (UTC)

Boxscore

New Caledonia	65–38	Papua New Guinea
Scoring by quarter: 16-10, 16-10, 23-2, 10-16
Pts: Adjouhgniope 18; Rebs: Adjouhgniope 14; Asts: Adjouhgniope, Souque 2		Pts: Kala 14; Rebs: Amos 14; Asts: 3 players 1

Vodafone Arena, Suva (FIJ)

=== Bronze medal game ===
5 December 2014
23:00 (UTC)

Boxscore

Tahiti	48–54	Guam
Scoring by quarter: 16-15, 15-9, 9-16, 8-14
Pts: A.Tepu, Tehoiri 18; Rebs: Vaiho 11; Asts: Tehoiri 3		Pts: Castro 20; Rebs: Castro 14; Asts: Benavente 5

Vodafone Arena, Suva (FIJ)

=== Final ===
6 December 2014
4:00 (UTC)

Boxscore

Australia	98–65	New Zealand
Scoring by quarter: 23-17, 23-8, 20-21, 32-19
Pts: Smith 21; Rebs: Maley 17; Asts: Wallace 4		Pts: Leger-Walker 15; Rebs: Wilson 6 Asts: Leger-Walker 3

Vodafone Arena, Suva (FIJ)

== Final ranking ==
Qualified for the 2015 FIBA Under-19 World Championship for Women.

Rank	Team	Record
1st place, gold medalist(s)	Australia	6–0
2nd place, silver medalist(s)	New Zealand	5–1
3rd place, bronze medalist(s)	Guam	4–2
4	Tahiti	3–3
5	New Caledonia	3–2
6	Papua New Guinea	2–3
7	Fiji	2–3
8	Solomon Islands	0–5
9	Samoa	0–5
10	American Samoa	0–5
