= 2016 FIBA Oceania Under-18 Championship for Women =

Tournament details
- Host country: Fiji
- City: Suva
- Dates: 5–10 December 2016
- Teams: 8 (from 1 confederation)
- Venue: 1 (in 1 host city)

Final positions
- Champions: Australia (7th title)
- Runners-up: New Zealand
- Third place: Samoa

Tournament statistics
- MVP: (Australia) Zitina Aokuso

Official website
- 2016 FIBA Oceania U-18 Championship for Women

The 2016 FIBA Oceania Under-18 Championship for Women was the seventh FIBA Oceania Under-18 Championship for Women. This was also the FIBA Oceania's qualifying tournament for the 2017 FIBA Under-19 Women's Basketball World Cup. The tournament was held in Suva, Fiji, from 5 to 10 December 2016. Australia beat New Zealand in the final, 107–52, to earn the country's 7th consecutive gold in this event.

== Participating teams ==
- Fiji (Hosts)
- Australia
- Guam
- New Caledonia
- New Zealand
- Papua New Guinea
- Samoa
- Tahiti

== Venue ==
- Vodafone Arena, Suva

== Preliminary round ==
All times given are local time (UTC+13)

=== Group A ===
Pos	Team	Pld	W	L	PF	PA	PD	Pts	Qualification
1	Australia	3	3	0	381	33	+348	6	Semifinals
2	Samoa	3	2	1	156	199	−43	5	Semifinals
3	Fiji (H)	3	1	2	90	198	−108	4	5th–8th place classification
4	Tahiti	3	0	3	73	270	−197	3	5th–8th place classification

Source: FIBA
(H) Hosts

5 December
8:00

Boxscore

Australia	125–5	Tahiti
Scoring by quarter: 39–0, 36–0, 24–5, 26–0
Pts: Horvat 17; Rebs: Magbegor 13; Asts: Cubillo, Horvat 4		Pts: Vaiho 3 Rebs: Teua 4 Asts: Teriierooiterai, Vaiho 1

Vodafone Arena, Suva

5 December
11:00

Boxscore

Fiji	26–47	Samoa
Scoring by quarter: 2–3, 6–16, 9–16, 9–12
Pts: Katia 9 Rebs: Katia 15; Asts: Katia 2		Pts: Manumaleuga 16; Rebs: Hettig, F. Ropati 9 Asts: Manumaleuga 3

Vodafone Arena, Suva

6 December
12:00

Boxscore

Samoa	20–134	Australia
Scoring by quarter: 9–40, 0–26, 6–33, 5–35
Pts: three players 6 Rebs: three players 6 Asts: L. Ropati 2		Pts: Shelley 24; Rebs: Magbegor 12; Asts: Cubillo 6

Vodafone Arena, Suva

6 December
20:00

Boxscore

Tahiti	29–56	Fiji
Scoring by quarter: 14–15, 2–14, 8–11, 5–16
Pts: Vaiho 12; Rebs: four players 4 Asts: three players 2		Pts: Foiakau, T. Kainamoli 16; Rebs: Katia 11; Asts: T. Kainamoli 6

Vodafone Arena, Suva

7 December
14:00

Boxscore

Samoa	89–39	Tahiti
Scoring by quarter: 25–4, 23–5, 20–24, 21–6
Pts: F. Ropati 20; Rebs: F. Ropati 10; Asts: L. Ropati 5		Pts: Aunoa, Bonnet 9 Rebs: Allaguy Salachy 9 Asts: Estall 2

Vodafone Arena, Suva

7 December
16:00

Boxscore

Fiji	8–122	Australia
Scoring by quarter: 2–21, 0–37, 0–40, 6–24
Pts: B. Tawake 4 Rebs: T. Kainamoli 7 Asts: Senibulu, T. Kainamoli 1		Pts: Horvat 24; Rebs: four players 8 Asts: three players 4

Vodafone Arena, Suva

=== Group B ===
Pos	Team	Pld	W	L	PF	PA	PD	Pts	Qualification
1	New Zealand	3	3	0	379	46	+333	6	Semifinals
2	New Caledonia	3	2	1	132	172	−40	5	Semifinals
3	Guam	3	1	2	101	246	−145	4	5th–8th place classification
4	Papua New Guinea	3	0	3	89	237	−148	3	5th–8th place classification

Source: FIBA

5 December
14:40

Boxscore

New Caledonia	59–20	Papua New Guinea
Scoring by quarter: 16–5, 14–6, 16–2, 13–7
Pts: Tuufui 16; Rebs: Fanalupe, Tuufui 8 Asts: Forest 3		Pts: N. Dobunaba 8 Rebs: Arthur 16; Asts: B. Dobunaba 2

Vodafone Arena, Suva

5 December
16:30

Boxscore

Guam	18–132	New Zealand
Scoring by quarter: 8–30, 4–36, 6–29, 0–37
Pts: Ogo 6 Rebs: three players 4 Asts: three players 1		Pts: Reed 22; Rebs: Jillings 8 Asts: three players 3

Vodafone Arena, Suva

6 December
8:00

Boxscore

Papua New Guinea	56–57	Guam
Scoring by quarter: 11–7, 21–13, 14–20, 10–17
Pts: Arthur 13; Rebs: Arthur 15; Asts: B. Dobunaba 3		Pts: Bulala 24; Rebs: Hattori; Asts: three players 2

Vodafone Arena, Suva

6 December
10:00

Boxscore

New Zealand	126–15	New Caledonia
Scoring by quarter: 22–2, 35–4, 39–2, 30–7
Pts: Jillings 19; Rebs: Heremaia 8 Asts: four players 3		Pts: Hamu, Tuufui 4 Rebs: Kaidine, Wayaridri 4 Asts: none

Vodafone Arena, Suva

7 December
10:00

Boxscore

New Caledonia	58–26	Guam
Scoring by quarter: 10–0, 14–5, 12–13, 22–8
Pts: Fanalupe 16; Rebs: Wayaridri 11; Asts: Forest 4		Pts: Senne 5 Rebs: Meno, Perez 5 Asts: three players 1

Vodafone Arena, Suva

7 December
12:00

Boxscore

Papua New Guinea	13–121	New Zealand
Scoring by quarter: 7–34, 4–37, 2–27, 0–23
Pts: Bray 6 Rebs: Bray, Haro 4 Asts: Bray 1		Pts: Reed 19; Rebs: Heremaia, Whittaker 8 Asts: Leger-Walker 5

Vodafone Arena, Suva

== 5th–8th place classification ==
All times given are local time (UTC+13).

5th–8th place semifinals
8 December
Fiji	70
Papua New Guinea	42
8 December
Guam	37
Tahiti	52

Fifth place game
9 December
Fiji	71
Tahiti	37
Seventh place game
9 December
Papua New Guinea	70
Guam	52

=== 5th–8th place semifinals ===
8 December
17:00

Boxscore

Guam	37–52	Tahiti
Scoring by quarter: 12–9, 9–13, 9–16, 7–14
Pts: Bulala 12; Rebs: Duenas 8 Asts: Miranda 3		Pts: Teua 16; Rebs: Teua 13; Asts: Allaguy Salachy 3

Vodafone Arena, Suva

8 December
19:00

Boxscore

Fiji	70–42	Papua New Guinea
Scoring by quarter: 19–13, 17–7, 20–10, 14–12
Pts: Katia 27; Rebs: Rokowailoa 15; Asts: five players 1		Pts: N. Dobunaba, Haro 11; Rebs: N. Dobunaba 12; Asts: none

Vodafone Arena, Suva

=== Seventh place game ===
9 December
8:00

Boxscore

Papua New Guinea	70–52	Guam
Scoring by quarter: 18–12, 16–17, 12–15, 24–8
Pts: Arthur 15; Rebs: Haro 23; Asts: three players 1		Pts: Bulala 12; Rebs: Duenas 8 Asts: Miranda 3

Vodafone Arena, Suva

=== Fifth place game ===
9 December
12:00

Boxscore

Fiji	71–37	Tahiti
Scoring by quarter: 18–3, 22–12, 19–13, 12–9
Pts: Katia 27; Rebs: Rokowailoa 15; Asts: five players 1		Pts: Garel-Laurin 11; Rebs: Allaguy Salachy 10; Asts: Vaiho 3

Vodafone Arena, Suva

== Final round ==
All times given are local time (UTC+13).

Semifinals
9 December
Australia	137
New Caledonia	8
9 December
New Zealand	108
Samoa	25

Final
10 December
Australia	107
New Zealand	52
Third place game
10 December
New Caledonia	65
Samoa	75

=== Semifinals ===
9 December
14:00

Boxscore

Australia	137–8	New Caledonia
Scoring by quarter: 37–0, 33–0, 35–3, 32–5
Pts: Horvat, McSpadden 22; Rebs: Horvat 11; Asts: Conti 6		Pts: Qenenoj 4 Rebs: Qenenoj 5 Asts: none

Vodafone Arena, Suva

9 December
18:00

Boxscore

New Zealand	108–25	Samoa
Scoring by quarter: 25–4, 31–10, 27–9, 25–2
Pts: Clarke 14; Rebs: McGoldrick, Whittaker 9 Asts: Jillings 5		Pts: Sau 8 Rebs: Hettig 10; Asts: Manumaleuga 2

Vodafone Arena, Suva

=== Third place game ===
10 December
11:00

Boxscore

New Caledonia	65–75	Samoa
Scoring by quarter: 13–17, 18–15, 15–27, 19–16
Pts: Fanalupe 22; Rebs: Fanalupe 15; Asts: Forest 4		Pts: Sau 8 Rebs: Hettig 8 Asts: Manumaleuga 3

Vodafone Arena, Suva

=== Final ===
10 December
16:00

Boxscore

Australia	107–52	New Zealand
Scoring by quarter: 28–9, 21–11, 28–16, 30–16
Pts: Horvat, McSpadden 22; Rebs: Horvat 11; Asts: Conti 6		Pts: Leger-Walker 12; Rebs: Reed 7 Asts: Leger-Walker, Reed 2

Vodafone Arena, Suva

== Awards ==
2016 FIBA Oceania Under-18
Championship for Women winners

Australia
Seventh title

All-Tournament Team

- (Australia) Monique Conti
- (Australia) Jazmin Shelley
- (Australia) Ezi Magbegor
- (New Zealand) Akiene Reed
- (Fiji) Losalina Katia

Grand Final MVP

- (Australia) Zitina Aokuso

== Final standings ==
Qualified for the 2017 FIBA Under-19 Women's Basketball World Cup

Rank	Team	Record
1st place, gold medalist(s)	Australia	5–0
2nd place, silver medalist(s)	New Zealand	4–1
3rd place, bronze medalist(s)	Samoa	3–2
4	New Caledonia	2–3
5	Fiji	3–2
6	Tahiti	1–4
7	Papua New Guinea	1–4
8	Guam	1–4
