= Zhang Ziyu =

Chinese basketball player (born 2007)

- Zhang Ziyu in 2026

No. 29 – Shandong Six Stars
- Position: Center
- League: Women's Chinese Basketball Association

Personal information
- Born: 1 May 2007 (age 19) Jinan, Shandong, China
- Listed height: 224 cm (7 ft 4 in)

Career information
- High school: Shandong Experimental High School (Jinan)
- Playing career: 2025–present

Career history
- 2026–present: Shandong Six Stars

Career highlights
- U18 Asia Cup MVP (2024)
Medals
Women's basketball
Representing China
Asia Cup
Bronze medal – third place	2025 China
U18 Asia Cup
Silver medal – second place	2024 China

Zhang Ziyu (Chinese: 张子宇; pinyin: Zhāng Zǐyǔ, born 1 May 2007) is a Chinese basketball player playing for the Shandong Six Stars. She is known for her height of 2.24m (7' 3"). She was named the most valuable player of the 2024 FIBA Under-18 Women's Asia Cup.

== Early life ==
Zhang was born on 1 May 2007 and grew up in Shandong province in China. Her parents were both basketball players and began teaching her the sport when she was age five. Her mother, Yu Ying, played for the China national team. By first grade, she was reported to have a height of 5 feet 2 inches (1.57 m) and by sixth grade, she was reported to be 6 feet 9 inches (2.06 m), according to the Global Times.

Zhang attended Wenhua East Road Primary School in Jinan, junior high school at Tsinghua University High School in Beijing and later Jinan Sports School, and high school at Shandong Experimental High School in Jinan. When she was age 14, she competed at the U15 National Basketball League tournament and helped her team win the finals. Measuring at a reported 7'3 at the tournament, she went viral after recording 42 points, 25 rebounds and six blocks in the finals, being noted for "towering over her opponents". She received comparisons to Chinese NBA star Yao Ming.

In 2022, Zhang scored 62 points and 13 rebounds at the national U15 championship and then three weeks later scored 68 points and 24 rebounds at the provincial championships. She was the star player for Shandong at the U17 national championship in 2023, scoring 30 points and 21 rebounds in 26 minutes to help the team win the finals.

== Professional career ==
She played in the Women's Chinese Basketball Association 2025 All-Star Game before making her professional debut.

She made her professional debut on January 4, 2026, scoring 15 points and 6 rebounds in 13 minutes in a 106–93 win against the Hebei Win Power.

== International career ==
Zhang Ziyu (CHN) vs Kiki Iriafen (USA) at the WBWC 2026

Zhang was selected for Team China at the 2024 FIBA Under-18 Women's Asia Cup. According to FIBA, she measured at 220 centimetres (7 ft 3 in) at the tournament, although some sources have reported her to be 224 centimetres (7 ft 4 in) or 226 centimetres (7 ft 5 in). In her debut for Team China, playing against Indonesia, she came off the bench and played 13 minutes, while scoring 19 points and shooting 9-for-9 in a 109–50 win. In the following game against New Zealand, she recorded 36 points, 13 rebounds, and four blocks, making 80% of her shots. She followed it up with 44 points against Japan, breaking the all-time tournament record, while also having 14 rebounds. In the finals, against Australia, she scored 42 points and 14 rebounds while helping China finish runner-up. She was named a tournament All-Star and the tournament most valuable player, having averaged 35.0 points and 12.8 rebounds per game; her height and play during the competition went viral, receiving international attention.

On 13 June 2025, she made her senior international debut for China against Bosnia and Herzegovina, scoring 18 points, 7 rebounds, 1 assist and 1 block in 12 minutes of playing time.

Zhang made her international debut in a senior major tournament for China in the 2025 FIBA Women's Asia Cup.
