= 2019 FIBA Under-17 Women's Oceania Championship =

2nd Oceanian U17 Women's Basketball Championship

Tournament details
- Host country: New Caledonia
- City: Nouméa
- Dates: 19–24 August 2019
- Teams: 8 (from 1 confederation)
- Venues: 2 (in 1 host city)

Final positions
- Champions: Australia (2nd title)
- Runners-up: New Zealand
- Third place: Tahiti

Tournament statistics
- Top scorer: (Papua New Guinea) Javapro (21.3)
- Top rebounds: (Cook Islands) Jallow (14.8)
- Top assists: (Australia) Price (4.8)
- PPG (Team): Australia (109.8)
- RPG (Team): Cook Islands (65.8)
- APG (Team): Australia (25.4)

Official website
- 2019 FIBA Under-17 Women's Oceania Championship

The 2019 FIBA Under-17 Women's Oceania Championship was an international under-17 basketball tournament held from 19 to 24 August 2019 by FIBA Oceania in Nouméa, New Caledonia. Australia were the defending champions and they successfully defended their title after defeating New Zealand in the final, 88–41.

== Hosts selection ==
On 23 September 2016, FIBA Oceania announced during their Board Meeting that New Caledonia was to host the tournament.

== Participating teams ==
- Australia
- Cook Islands
- Guam
- New Caledonia
- New Zealand
- Papua New Guinea
- Samoa
- Tahiti

== Group phase ==
All times are local (UTC+11:00).

=== Group A ===
Pos	Team	Pld	W	L	PF	PA	PD	Pts	Qualification
1	Australia	3	3	0	322	70	+252	6	Semifinals
2	New Zealand	3	2	1	286	138	+148	5	Semifinals
3	Samoa	3	1	2	124	243	−119	4	Quarterfinals
4	Guam	3	0	3	84	365	−281	3	Quarterfinals

Source: FIBA

19 August
9:00

Report

Australia	144–9	Guam
Scoring by quarter: 47–0, 34–7, 32–0, 31–2
Pts: Swain 21; Rebs: Prior 11; Asts: Swain 8		Pts: Salas 5 Rebs: Silva 2 Asts: Paulino 1

L'Arène du Sud, Païta

19 August
13:00

Report

New Zealand	93–35	Samoa
Scoring by quarter: 27–10, 28–12, 16–11, 22–2
Pts: A. Williams 17; Rebs: Adams 7 Asts: Marama 5		Pts: Coulter-Faamafu 11; Rebs: Coulter-Faamafu 9 Asts: Niu, Taufua 2

L'Arène du Sud, Païta

20 August
9:00

Report

Guam	24–140	New Zealand
Scoring by quarter: 5–36, 2–37, 8–30, 9–37
Pts: Banez 6 Rebs: Salas 3 Asts: Banez 1		Pts: Fourie 23; Rebs: Fourie 10; Asts: A. Williams 3

L'Arène du Sud, Païta

20 August
13:00

Report

Samoa	8–99	Australia
Scoring by quarter: 0–36, 6–21, 0–17, 2–25
Pts: Niu 5 Rebs: Niu 6 Asts: Fautua, Lealiiee 1		Pts: Potter 20; Rebs: Rees 14; Asts: Dunn 4

L'Arène du Sud, Païta

21 August
13:00

Report

New Zealand	53–79	Australia
Scoring by quarter: 16–22, 14–21, 14–11, 9–25
Pts: Tahata, A. Williams 12; Rebs: Tahata 6 Asts: Marama, Tahata 2		Pts: Potter, Prior 13; Rebs: Prior, Rees 11; Asts: Price 6

L'Arène du Sud, Païta

21 August
16:00

Report

Guam	51–81	Samoa
Scoring by quarter: 11–21, 19–23, 13–17, 8–20
Pts: Salas 17; Rebs: Terlaje 6 Asts: Pangelinan 2		Pts: Niu 15; Rebs: Niu 18; Asts: Lealiiee 4

Salle Anewy, Nouméa

=== Group B ===
Pos	Team	Pld	W	L	PF	PA	PD	Pts	Qualification
1	Tahiti	3	3	0	221	116	+105	6	Quarterfinals
2	New Caledonia (H)	3	2	1	172	169	+3	5	Quarterfinals
3	Papua New Guinea	3	1	2	132	182	−50	4	7th place game
4	Cook Islands	3	0	3	135	193	−58	3	7th place game

Source: Standings
(H) Hosts

19 August
16:00

Report

Tahiti	78–29	Papua New Guinea
Scoring by quarter: 25–7, 26–5, 21–8, 6– 9
Pts: Viriamu 15; Rebs: Doyen-Etaeta, Tavanae 9 Asts: Laval 5		Pts: Javapro 13; Rebs: Kaore 8 Asts: Three players 1

Salle Anewy, Nouméa

19 August
17:00

Report

Cook Islands	54–62	New Caledonia
Scoring by quarter: 10–14, 8–13, 25–14, 5–13
Pts: Arnold, Jallow 12; Rebs: Jallow 17; Asts: Schmid, Solomon 2		Pts: Sangarne 14; Rebs: Puleoto 15; Asts: Puleoto, Tetuanui 3

L'Arène du Sud, Païta

20 August
16:00

Report

Papua New Guinea	52–48	Cook Islands
Scoring by quarter: 12–9, 10–18, 16–10, 14–11
Pts: Javapro, Kaiawa 14; Rebs: Kaore 18; Asts: Kaiawa 5		Pts: Solomon 14; Rebs: Jallow 16; Asts: Solomon 3

Salle Anewy, Nouméa

20 August
17:00

Report

New Caledonia	54– 64	Tahiti
Scoring by quarter: 7–14, 14–14, 14–13, 19–23
Pts: Puleoto 16; Rebs: Tartas 16; Asts: Tartas 3		Pts: Richmond 25; Rebs: Richmond 20; Asts: Laval 3

L'Arène du Sud, Païta

21 August
9:00

Report

Tahiti	79–33	Cook Islands
Scoring by quarter: 19–5, 18–9, 22–12, 20–7
Pts: Tavanae 17; Rebs: Tavanae 7 Asts: Tavanae 7		Pts: Solomon 11; Rebs: Jallow, Solomon 14

L'Arène du Sud, Païta

21 August
16:00

Report

New Caledonia	56–51	Papua New Guinea
Scoring by quarter: 16–11, 10–15, 13–15, 17–10
Pts: Tartas 14; Rebs: Tartas 18; Asts: Tartas 3		Pts: Javapro 16; Rebs: Isei 13; Asts: Kotoveke 2

L'Arène du Sud, Païta

== Playoffs ==
=== Bracket ===
Quarterfinals
22 August
Guam	32
Tahiti	70
22 August
Samoa	60
New Caledonia	41

Semifinals
23 August
Australia	139
Tahiti	16
23 August
New Zealand	84
Samoa	26

Final
24 August
Australia	88
New Zealand	41
Bronze medal match
24 August
Tahiti	62
Samoa	56

=== 7th place game ===
22 August 2019
09:00

Report

Papua New Guinea	59–58	Cook Islands
Scoring by quarter: 13–15, 17–12, 13–16, 16–15
Pts: Javapro 42; Rebs: Kaore 16; Asts: Javapro 3		Pts: Jallow, Solomon 14; Rebs: Solomon 17; Asts: Arnold 3

L'Arène du Sud, Païta

=== Quarterfinals ===
22 August 2019
13:00

Report

Samoa	60–41	New Caledonia
Scoring by quarter: 15–11, 16–10, 13–10, 16–10
Pts: Lale 14; Rebs: Coulter-Faamafu 21; Asts: Niu 4		Pts: Tetuanui 8 Rebs: Puleoto 11; Asts: Puleoto, Tartas 2

L'Arène du Sud, Païta

22 August 2019
17:00

Report

Guam	32–70	Tahiti
Scoring by quarter: 9–18, 7–14, 8–20, 8–18
Pts: Silva 9 Rebs: Salas 8 Asts: Four players 1		Pts: Salem 18; Rebs: Doyen-Etaeta 13; Asts: Tavanae 7

L'Arène du Sud, Païta

=== 5th place game ===
23 August 2019
9:00

Report

New Caledonia	72–75	Guam
Scoring by quarter: 20–18, 12–13, 19–24, 21–20
Pts: Puleoto 24; Rebs: Tartas 17; Asts: Tartas 6		Pts: Salas 37; Rebs: Borja 7 Asts: Paulino 4

L'Arène du Sud, Païta

=== Semifinals ===
23 August 2019
13:00

Report

Australia	139–16	Tahiti
Scoring by quarter: 38–2, 38–6, 32–4, 31–4
Pts: Pollerd, Price 20; Rebs: Melbourne, Price 8 Asts: Price 8		Pts: Doyen-Etaeta, Tavanae 4 Rebs: Richmond 4 Asts: Four players 1

L'Arène du Sud, Païta

23 August 2019
17:00

Report

New Zealand	84–26	Samoa
Scoring by quarter: 12–8, 34–4, 25–8, 13–6
Pts: Three players 12; Rebs: Matehaere 9 Asts: Matehaere, A. Williams 3		Pts: Limu Quarter 9 Rebs: Coulter-Faamafu 8 Asts: Three players 1

L'Arène du Sud, Païta

=== Bronze medal game ===
24 August 2019
13:00

Report

Tahiti	62–56	Samoa
Scoring by quarter: 17–14, 8–11, 24–15, 13–16
Pts: Salem 22; Rebs: Richmond 8 Asts: Tavanae 6		Pts: Lealiiee 14; Rebs: Coulter-Faamafu 15; Asts: Coulter-Faamafu, Niu 2

L'Arène du Sud, Païta

=== Final ===
24 August 2019
17:00

Report

Australia	88–41	New Zealand
Scoring by quarter: 22–16, 24–8, 26–12, 16–5
Pts: Melbourne 21; Rebs: Rees 10; Asts: Melbourne 7		Pts: Tahata 8 Rebs: Strawbridge 5 Asts: A. Williams 2

L'Arène du Sud, Païta

== Final standings ==
#	Team	Pld	W	L	PF	PA	PD	FIBA World Ranking		
#	Team	Pld	W	L	PF	PA	PD	Old	New	+/−
1st place, gold medalist(s)	Australia	5	5	0	549	127	+422	7		
2nd place, silver medalist(s)	New Zealand	5	3	2	411	252	+159	33		
3rd place, bronze medalist(s)	Tahiti	6	5	1	369	343	+26	63		
4th	Samoa	6	2	4	266	430	–164	71		
5th	Guam	5	1	4	191	507	–316	70		
6th	New Caledonia	5	2	3	285	304	–19	67		
7th	Papua New Guinea	4	2	2	191	240	–49	76		
8th	Cook Islands	4	0	4	193	252	–59	–		

Qualified for the 2020 FIBA U18 Women's Asian Championship

=== Awards ===
The All-Star Five were announced on 25 August 2019.

All-Star Five
Guards	Forward	Center
(Australia) Kate Deeble (New Zealand) Arielle Williams (French Polynesia) Mahinetea Tavanae	(Australia) Gemma Potter	(Australia) Kelsey Rees
