= Papua New Guinea women's national under-17 basketball team =

Youth national basketball team of Papua New Guinea

Papua New Guinea
- FIBA zone: FIBA Oceania
- National federation: Basketball Federation of Papua New Guinea
- Coach: Mary Elavo

U19 World Cup
- Appearances: None

U18 Asia Cup
- Appearances: None

U17/U18 Oceania Cup
- Appearances: 4
- Medals: None

The Papua New Guinea women's national under-17 basketball team is a national basketball team of Papua New Guinea, administered by the Basketball Federation of Papua New Guinea. It represents the country in international under-17 women's basketball competitions.

== U17/U18 Oceania Cup participations ==
Year	Result
2014	6th
2016	7th
2019	7th
2023	4th

== See also ==
- Papua New Guinea women's national basketball team
- Papua New Guinea women's national under-15 basketball team
- Papua New Guinea men's national under-18 basketball team
