= New Zealand women's national under-18 basketball team =

Youth national basketball team

New Zealand
- Joined FIBA: 1951
- FIBA zone: FIBA Asia
- National federation: Basketball New Zealand

U19 World Cup
- Appearances: None

U18 Asia Cup
- Appearances: 4
- Medals: None

U17/U18 Oceania Cup
- Appearances: 11
- Medals: Silver: 11 (2004, 2006, 2008, 2010, 2012, 2014, 2016, 2017, 2019, 2023, 2025)
Medal record
U17/U18 Oceania Cup
Silver medal – second place	2004 Melbourne
Silver medal – second place	2006 AUS / NZL
Silver medal – second place	2008 Adelaide
Silver medal – second place	2010 Palmerston North
Silver medal – second place	2012 Porirua
Silver medal – second place	2014 Suva
Silver medal – second place	2016 Suva
Silver medal – second place	2017 Hagåtña
Silver medal – second place	2019 Nouméa
Silver medal – second place	2023 Port Moresby
Silver medal – second place	2025 Apia

The New Zealand women's national under-17 and under-18 basketball team is the junior women's national basketball team of New Zealand, governed by Basketball New Zealand. It represents the country in international under-17 and under-18 women's basketball competitions.

== U17/U18 Oceania Cup participations ==
Year	Result
2004	2nd place, silver medalist(s)
2006	2nd place, silver medalist(s)
2008	2nd place, silver medalist(s)
2010	2nd place, silver medalist(s)
2012	2nd place, silver medalist(s)
2014	2nd place, silver medalist(s)
2016	2nd place, silver medalist(s)
2017	2nd place, silver medalist(s)
2019	2nd place, silver medalist(s)
2023	2nd place, silver medalist(s)
2025	2nd place, silver medalist(s)

== U18 Asia Cup participations ==
Year	Result
2018	5th
2022	6th
2024	5th
2026	7th

== See also ==
- New Zealand women's national basketball team
- New Zealand women's national under-17 basketball team
- New Zealand men's national under-19 basketball team
