= Lebanon national team =

Lebanon national team can refer to different sports:

- Lebanon men's national ball hockey team, men's ball hockey
- Lebanon men's national basketball team, men's basketball
- Lebanon women's national basketball team, women's basketball
- Lebanon national beach soccer team, men's beach soccer
- Lebanon national football team, men's football
- Lebanon women's national football team, women's football
- Lebanon national futsal team, men's futsal
- Lebanon women's national futsal team, women's futsal
- Lebanon men's national handball team, men's handball
- Lebanon men's national ice hockey team, men's ice hockey
- Lebanon national rugby league team, men's rugby league
- Lebanon national rugby union team, men's rugby union
- Lebanon men's national volleyball team, men's volleyball

== See also ==
- Lebanon national basketball team
