= 2024 FIBA U18 Women's Asia Cup =

26th edition of the biennial competition

26th FIBA Under-18 Women's Asian Basketball Championship

Tournament details
- Host country: China
- City: Shenzhen
- Dates: 24–30 June
- Teams: 16 (from 1 confederation)
- Venue: 2 (in 1 host city)

Final positions
- Champions: Australia (2nd title)
- Runners-up: China
- Third place: Japan

Tournament statistics
- MVP: (China) Zhang Z.Y.
- Top scorer: (China) Zhang Z.Y. (35.0)
- Top rebounds: (China) Zhang Z.Y. (12.8)
- Top assists: (China) Wang J.X. (6.8)
- PPG (Team): Philippines (99.0)
- RPG (Team): Samoa (61.8)
- APG (Team): China (27.0)

Official website
- 2024 FIBA U18 Women's Asia Cup Division A 2024 FIBA U18 Women's Asia Cup Division B

The 2024 FIBA U18 Women's Asia Cup was an international under-18 basketball competition that was held in Shenzhen, China, from 24 to 30 June 2024. The tournament was the 26th edition of the biennial FIBA Under-18 Women's Asia Cup, previously known as the FIBA U18 Women's Asian Championship. The top four teams qualified for and will represent FIBA Asia at the 2025 FIBA Under-19 Women's Basketball World Cup in the Czech Republic.

Australia defeated China in the final rematch, with a score of 96–79, to win their second championship overall. Japan defeated South Korea, with a score of 69–53, in the bronze medal match. Indonesia was relegated to Division B after their defeat by Malaysia, with a score of 67–66 in overtime.

The Philippines was promoted to Division A after defeating Lebanon, with a score of 95–64 in the Division B final tournament.

== Venues ==
Shenzhen	Guangdong
Longhua Cultural and Sports Center; Capacity: 6,478	2024 FIBA U18 Women's Asia Cup (Guangdong)
Futian Sports Park	2024 FIBA U18 Women's Asia Cup (Guangdong)

== Qualified teams ==
For Division A:

- Top seven teams of the 2022 FIBA U18 Women's Asian Championship Division A:
  - Australia
  - China
  - Japan
  - Chinese Taipei
  - South Korea
  - New Zealand
  - Indonesia
- Winners of the 2022 FIBA U18 Women's Asian Championship Division B:
  - Malaysia

For Division B:

- Three teams from the 2018 FIBA U18 Women's Asian Championship Division B:
  - Samoa
  - Hong Kong
  - Maldives
- One team from the SEABA qualifiers
  - Philippines
- Other four teams from FIBA Asia:
  - Iran
  - Kyrgyzstan
  - Lebanon
  - Syria

India was demoted from 2022 FIBA U18 Women's Asian Championship Division A but is not listed among the participating teams for the Division B tournament.

== Competition format ==
The sixteen participating teams will be divided into two divisions, Division A and Division B of eight teams each.

In each division, the eight participating teams are divided into two groups (A and B) of four teams each.

Each team shall play all the other teams within its own group. The final stage standings will be established after the games for a total of twelve are all played.

Teams that will finish first in each group will advance to the semifinal round, awaiting the winners of the qualification to semifinals round.

Teams that will finish second and third in each group will face the third-placed and second-placed team, respectively, in the other group within its own division for the qualification to semifinals round.

Winners of the qualification to semifinals round will face the outright semifinalists in the semifinal round. Losers will face each other for the fifth-sixth place classification round.

For the seventh-eighth place classification round, teams that will finish fourth in each group will face the other fourth-placed team in the other group within its own division.

For Division A, all semifinalists will qualify to the 2025 FIBA U19 Women's Basketball World Cup.

The Champion team from Division B will be promoted to Division A for the next championship, replacing the eighth-placed team in Division A that will be relegated to Division B for the next championship.

== Divisions ==
Included were, the FIBA World Rankings prior to the games.

Division A	Division B
Australia (5); Japan (9); China (19); South Korea (25); Chinese Taipei (28); New Zealand (31); Indonesia (42); Malaysia (63)	Samoa (48); Philippines (49); Syria (51); Iran (66); Hong Kong (73); Lebanon (86); Maldives (96); Kyrgyzstan (NR)

== Division A ==
All times are Chinese Standard Time (UTC+08:00)

=== Group Phase ===
The groups were announced on 7 June 2024.

==== Group A ====
Pos	Team	Pld	W	L	PF	PA	PD	Pts	Qualification
1	Australia	3	3	0	299	157	+142	6	Advance to semifinals
2	South Korea	3	2	1	202	183	+19	5	Qualification to qualifying round
3	Chinese Taipei	3	1	2	220	199	+21	4	Qualification to qualifying round
4	Malaysia	3	0	3	107	289	−182	3	Qualification to seventh place game

Source: FIBA
Rules for classification: (1) Tournament points, (2) Head-to-head tournament points, (3) Head-to-head goal average, (4) Overall goal average, (5) Drawing of lots

24 June 2024
11:30

Boxscore

Australia	124–38	Malaysia
Scoring by quarter: 30–5, 34–8, 32–12, 28–13
Pts: Somfal 28; Rebs: Shiels 12; Asts: Deas, Bobongie 6		Pts: Lee 9 Rebs: three players 4 Asts: Yap 3

Longhua Cultural and Sports Center, Shenzhen
Referees: Yuen Chun Yip (HKG), Samaneh Dehghani (IRI), Lau Suk Yee (HKG)

24 June 2024
14:00

Boxscore

Chinese Taipei	63–75	South Korea
Scoring by quarter: 15–24, 12–23, 17–16, 19–12
Pts: Yu H.L. 17; Rebs: Sin 7 Asts: Chen 6		Pts: Choi Y.S. 19; Rebs: Choi Y.S., Song Y.H. 10; Asts: Lee W.J. 7

Longhua Cultural and Sports Center, Shenzhen
Referees: Yana Nikogossyan (KAZ), Suebpong Wichaiphin (THA), Elham Khazneh (JOR)

25 June 2024
11:30

Boxscore

Malaysia	34–90	Chinese Taipei
Scoring by quarter: 8–25, 8–18, 15–29, 3–18
Pts: Ler 15; Rebs: Yap 8 Asts: Yap 3		Pts: Pan 19; Rebs: Jhang 11; Asts: Hsu, Su 4

Longhua Cultural and Sports Center, Shenzhen
Referees: Suebpong Wichaipin (THA), Samaneh Dehgani (IRI), Chitchanok Srisawat (THA)

25 June 2024
14:00

Boxscore

South Korea	52–85	Australia
Scoring by quarter: 12–25, 14–22, 10–27, 16–11
Pts: Song 13; Rebs: Choi Y.S. 9 Asts: Lee G.H. 3		Pts: Daas, Somfai 19; Rebs: Somfai 11; Asts: Bobongie 4

Longhua Cultural and Sports Center, Shenzhen
Referees: Glenn Cornelio (PHI), Elham Khazneh (JOR), Fang Wenxuan (CHN)

26 June 2024
11:30

Boxscore

South Korea	75–35	Malaysia
Scoring by quarter: 20–13, 23–10, 15–8, 17–4
Pts: Lee G.H., Jeong 12; Rebs: Jung 11; Asts: Yu 7		Pts: Ang 9 Rebs: Yap 9 Asts: Oh 3

Longhua Cultural and Sports Center, Shenzhen
Referees: Yuen Chun Yip (HKG), Leila Alimoradihamedan (IRI), Lau Suk Yee (HKG)

26 June 2024
14:00

Boxscore

Australia	90–67	Chinese Taipei
Scoring by quarter: 27–10, 30–24, 21–26, 12–7
Pts: Shiels 22; Rebs: Shiels 14; Asts: Harvey 5		Pts: Mi 14; Rebs: Liao 7 Asts: Mi 6

Longhua Cultural and Sports Center, Shenzhen
Referees: Elham Khazneh (JOR), Leong Chuen Wing (SGP), Chitchanok Srisawat (THA)

==== Group B ====
Pos	Team	Pld	W	L	PF	PA	PD	Pts	Qualification
1	China	3	3	0	296	199	+97	6	Advance to semifinals
2	Japan	3	2	1	245	173	+72	5	Qualification to qualifying round
3	New Zealand	3	1	2	185	224	−39	4	Qualification to qualifying round
4	Indonesia	3	0	3	129	259	−130	3	Qualification to seventh place game

Source: FIBA
Rules for classification: (1) Tournament points, (2) Head-to-head tournament points, (3) Head-to-head goal average, (4) Overall goal average, (5) Drawing of lots

24 June 2024
16:30

Boxscore

Japan	84–47	New Zealand
Scoring by quarter: 26–8, 21–11, 19–19, 18–9
Pts: Tanaka 21; Rebs: Owaki 6 Asts: Horiuchi 5		Pts: Leger-Walker 14; Rebs: Lene 6 Asts: Walker 3

Longhua Cultural and Sports Center, Shenzhen
Referees: Glenn Cornelio (PHI), Jennifer Ammoury (LBN), Taha Al-Hashedi (YEM)

24 June 2024
19:00

Boxscore

China	109–50	Indonesia
Scoring by quarter: 24–13, 18–15, 34–13, 33–9
Pts: Xu P.L. 20; Rebs: Zhang Z.Y. 8 Asts: Wang J.X. 10		Pts: Djohan 10; Rebs: Sasongko 5 Asts: Mahanani 3

Longhua Cultural and Sports Center, Shenzhen
Referees: Leong Chuen Wing (HKG), Ernest Aquino (GUM), Chitchanok Srisawat (THA)

25 June 2024
16:30

Boxscore

Indonesia	29–80	Japan
Scoring by quarter: 6–21, 12–20, 2–26, 9–13
Pts: Sasongko 9 Rebs: Sutisna 7 Asts: Prajitno 2		Pts: Suzuki 21; Rebs: Hirayama 7 Asts: Horiuchi, Sone 3

Longhua Cultural and Sports Center, Shenzhen
Referees: Yuen Chun Yip (HKG), Leila Alimoreadihamedan (IRI), Ernest Aquino (GUM)

25 June 2024
19:00

Boxscore

New Zealand	68–90	China
Scoring by quarter: 15–27, 18–16, 16–28, 19–19
Pts: Lene 13; Rebs: Lassey 7 Asts: Walker, Leger-Walker 3		Pts: Zhang Z.Y. 36; Rebs: Zhang Z.Y. 13; Asts: Xu F.W. 7

Longhua Cultural and Sports Center, Shenzhen
Referees: Yana Nikogossyan (KAZ), Taha Al-Hashedi (YEM), Leong Chuen Wing (SGP)

26 June 2024
16:30

Boxscore

New Zealand	70–50	Indonesia
Scoring by quarter: 23–10, 22–8, 12–15, 13–17
Pts: Moors 14; Rebs: Moors 8 Asts: Lassey 5		Pts: Sutisna 14; Rebs: Sutisna 7 Asts: Mahanani 5

Longhua Cultural and Sports Center, Shenzhen
Referees: Taha Al-Hashedi (YEM), Samaneh Dehghani (IRI), Wee Chun Lim (MAS)

26 June 2024
19:00

Boxscore

China	97–81	Japan
Scoring by quarter: 23–20, 21–21, 27–16, 26–24
Pts: Zhang Z.Y. 44; Rebs: Zhang Z.Y. 14; Asts: Wang J.X. 12		Pts: Tanaka 28; Rebs: Hirayama 7 Asts: Tanaka 7

Longhua Cultural and Sports Center, Shenzhen
Referees: Glenn Cornelio (PHI), Yana Nikogossyan (KAZ), Suebpong Wichaipin (THA)

=== Knockout round ===
==== Bracket ====
Qualification to Semifinals
28 June
Japan	76
Chinese Taipei	70
28 June
South Korea	86
New Zealand	66

Semifinals
29 June
Australia	68
Japan	63
29 June
China	79
South Korea	61

Finals
30 June
Australia	96
China	79
Third Place
30 June
Japan	69
South Korea	54

==== Seventh place game ====
28 June 2024
14:00

Boxscore

Malaysia	67–66 (OT)	Indonesia
Scoring by quarter: 13–14, 20–15, 11–21, 18–12, Overtime: 5–4
Pts: Ng 23; Rebs: Yap Y.X. 11; Asts: four players 3		Pts: Sutisna, Putri 12; Rebs: Putri 9 Asts: Mahanani 5

Longhua Cultural and Sports Center, Shenzhen
Referees: Ernest Aquino (GUM), Fang Wenxuan (CHN), Lau Suk Yee (HKG)

==== Qualification to Semifinals ====
28 June 2024
16:30

Boxscore

South Korea	86–66	New Zealand
Scoring by quarter: 32–12, 22–21, 15–14, 17–19
Pts: Lee M.J. 25; Rebs: Song 8 Asts: Lee W.J. 8		Pts: Moors 13; Rebs: Moors 8 Asts: Lassey, Leger-Walker 4

Longhua Cultural and Sports Center, Shenzhen
Referees: Glenn Cornelio (PHI), Taha Al-Hashedi (YEM), Elham Khazneh (JOR)

28 June 2024
19:00

Boxscore

Japan	76–70	Chinese Taipei
Scoring by quarter: 13–16, 22–16, 25–17, 16–21
Pts: Tanaka 24; Rebs: Taniguchi 14; Asts: Tanaka 4		Pts: Mi 14; Rebs: Liao 13; Asts: Kayu 4

Longhua Cultural and Sports Center, Shenzhen
Referees: Yana Nikogossyan (KAZ), Leong Chuen Wing (SGP), Jennifer Ammoury (LBN)

==== Fifth place game ====
29 June 2024
14:00

Boxscore

New Zealand	66–61	Chinese Taipei
Scoring by quarter: 15–8, 15–17, 12–18, 24–18
Pts: Walker 13; Rebs: Moors 12; Asts: Leger-Walker 4		Pts: Yeh 12; Rebs: Lin 10; Asts: Su 9

Longhua Cultural and Sports Center, Shenzhen
Referees: Samaneh Dehgani (IRI), Haryanto Sutaryo (INA), Lim Wee Chun (MAS)

==== Semifinals ====
29 June 2024
16:30

Boxscore

Australia	68–63	Japan
Scoring by quarter: 19–12, 11–20, 17–18, 21–13
Pts: Somfai 19; Rebs: Shiels 11; Asts: Shiels 4		Pts: Horiuchi 18; Rebs: Matsumoto 7 Asts: Tanaka 4

Longhua Cultural and Sports Center, Shenzhen
Referees: Glenn Cornelio (PHI), Leong Chuen Wing (SGP), Jennifer Ammoury (LBN)

29 June 2024
19:00

Boxscore

China	79–61	South Korea
Scoring by quarter: 24–21, 21–3, 16–11, 18–26
Pts: Zhang Z.Y. 34; Rebs: Zhang Z.Y. 16; Asts: Zhang Z.Y., Xu F.W. 5		Pts: Lee G.H. 12; Rebs: Lee G.H. 10; Asts: three players 3

Longhua Cultural and Sports Center, Shenzhen
Referees: Yana Nikogossyan (KAZ), Taha Al-Hashedi (YEM), Suebpong Wichaipin (THA)

==== Third place game ====
30 June 2024
15:30

Boxscore

Japan	69–54	South Korea
Scoring by quarter: 25–4, 12–18, 18–16, 14–16
Pts: Tanaka 22; Rebs: Higashi 12; Asts: Horiuchi 3		Pts: Lee M.J. 19; Rebs: Choi 11; Asts: Lee W.J. 4

Longhua Cultural and Sports Center, Shenzhen
Referees: Sasha Nicholson (NZL), Leong Chuen Wing (SGP), Elham Khazneh (JOR)

==== Final ====
30 June 2024
18:00

Boxscore

Australia	96–79	China
Scoring by quarter: 22–19, 27–23, 19–21, 28–16
Pts: Shiels 31; Rebs: Shiels 15; Asts: Shiels 6		Pts: Zhang Z.Y. 42; Rebs: Zhang Z.Y. 14; Asts: Xu F.W. 7

Longhua Cultural and Sports Center, Shenzhen
Referees: Yana Nikogossyan (KAZ), Glenn Cornelio (PHI), Taha Al-Hashedi (YEM)

== Division B ==
All times are Chinese Standard Time (UTC+08:00)

=== Group Phase ===
==== Group A ====
Pos	Team	Pld	W	L	PF	PA	PD	Pts	Qualification
1	Iran	3	3	0	214	165	+49	6	Advance to semifinals
2	Samoa	3	2	1	219	169	+50	5	Qualification to qualifying round
3	Hong Kong	3	1	2	160	161	−1	4	Qualification to qualifying round
4	Kyrgyzstan	3	0	3	116	214	−98	3	

Source: FIBA
Rules for classification: (1) Tournament points, (2) Head-to-head tournament points, (3) Head-to-head goal average, (4) Overall goal average, (5) Drawing of lots

24 June 2024
11:30

Boxscore

Samoa	84–42	Kyrgyzstan
Scoring by quarter: 20–6, 22–10, 19–21, 23–5
Pts: Foa'i-Auimatagi 17; Rebs: Filemu 12; Asts: Manumaleuga 7		Pts: Mazikina 20; Rebs: Duisheeva 7 Asts: Urmambetova 5

Futian Sports Park, Shenzhen
Referees: Yu Yijing (CHN), Hwang Ji-sun (KOR), Fang Wenxuan (CHN)

24 June 2024
14:00

Boxscore

Iran	65–52	Hong Kong
Scoring by quarter: 22–11, 6–10, 19–16, 18–15
Pts: Karani 25; Rebs: Karani 10; Asts: Zarei 6		Pts: Lam 11; Rebs: Lu 12; Asts: Lam 5

Futian Sports Park, Shenzhen
Referees: Kim Bo-hui (KOR), Sasha Nicholson (NZL), Via Diah Rohmana (INA)

25 June 2024
11:30

Boxscore

Hong Kong	51–62	Samoa
Scoring by quarter: 8–20, 22–19, 17–11, 4–12
Pts: To 13; Rebs: Iu 9 Asts: To 4		Pts: Filemu 23; Rebs: Filemu 20; Asts: Manumaleuga 5

Futian Sports Park, Shenzhen
Referees: KIM Bo-hui (KOR), Miki Ogata (JPN), Hwang Ji-sun (KOR)

25 June 2024
14:00

Boxscore

Kyrgyzstan	40–73	Iran
Scoring by quarter: 11–16, 7–14, 14–18, 8–25
Pts: Mazikina 17; Rebs: Duisheeva 9 Asts: Mazikina 3		Pts: Karani 18; Rebs: 4 players 6 Asts: Jafarzadeh, Zarei 5

Futian Sports Park, Shenzhen
Referees: Huang Yun-Hsuan (TPE), Lim Wee Chun (MAS), Ge Qian (CHN)

26 June 2024
11:30

Boxscore

Samoa	73–76 (OT)	Iran
Scoring by quarter: 22–26, 15–11, 16–15, 13–14, Overtime: 7–10
Pts: Filemu 25; Rebs: Filemu 12; Asts: Filemu 9		Pts: Karani 26; Rebs: Dehyaghoubi 15; Asts: Zarei 7

Futian Sports Park, Shenzhen
Referees: Yu Yijing (CHN), Hwang Jisun (KOR), Via Diah Rohmana (INA)

26 June 2024
14:00

Boxscore

Hong Kong	57–34	Kyrgyzstan
Scoring by quarter: 16–4, 16–12, 13–13, 12–5
Pts: Wong N.T. 13; Rebs: Wong N.T. 14; Asts: To 4		Pts: Mazikina 12; Rebs: Talantbekova 10; Asts: three players 2

Futian Sports Park, Shenzhen
Referees: Sasha Nicholson (NZL), Haryanto Sutaryo (INA), Yap Khar Yin (MAS)

==== Group B ====
Pos	Team	Pld	W	L	PF	PA	PD	Pts	Qualification
1	Philippines	2	2	0	230	81	+149	4	Advance to semifinals
2	Lebanon	2	1	1	165	110	+55	3	Qualification to qualifying round
3	Maldives	2	0	2	39	243	−204	2	Qualification to qualifying round
4	Syria (Note: Syria failed to appear in their first two games against Lebanon and Maldives, resulting to forfeitures, initially awarded as 20–0 wins to their opponents. Based on Article 20, Section 2.3 of the Official Basketball Rules, Syria was disqualified as a result of two forfeitures. All results of the games against Syria are nullified.) (D)	0	0	0	0	0	0	0	Disqualified

Source: FIBA
Rules for classification: (1) Tournament points, (2) Head-to-head tournament points, (3) Head-to-head goal average, (4) Overall goal average, (5) Drawing of lots
(D) Disqualified
Notes:

24 June 2024
16:30

Boxscore

Philippines	141–18	Maldives
Scoring by quarter: 43–11, 36–3, 30–1, 32–3
Pts: Impreso, Villanueva 18; Rebs: Duenas 14; Asts: Fajardo 7		Pts: Sifan 9 Rebs: Sobah 6 Asts: Ishag 2

Futian Sports Park, Shenzhen
Referees: Miki Ogata (JPN), Calia Hanks (AUS), Yap Khar Yin (MAS)

25 June 2024
16:30

Boxscore

Lebanon	63–89	Philippines
Scoring by quarter: 14–25, 11–19, 14–15, 24–30
Pts: Naassan 17; Rebs: El Ghali 11; Asts: Naassan 5		Pts: Panganiban 25; Rebs: Ramos 19; Asts: Panganiban 8

Futian Sports Park, Shenzhen
Referees: Yu Yijing (CHN), Sasha Nicholson (NZL), Jiang Wenan (CHN)

26 June 2024
19:00

Boxscore

Lebanon	102–21	Maldives
Scoring by quarter: 17–5, 24–6, 37–2, 24–8
Pts: El Ghali 17; Rebs: Ajami 21; Asts: Al Nakib 4		Pts: Shameem 11; Rebs: Zakariya, Sobah 5 Asts: Shameem 2

Futian Sports Park, Shenzhen
Referees: Jiang Wenan (CHN), Kim Bohui (KOR), Calia Hanks (AUS)

=== Knockout round ===
Qualification to Semifinals
28 June
Lebanon	68
Hong Kong	41
28 June
Samoa	94
Maldives	31

Semifinals
29 June
Iran	49
Lebanon	64
29 June
Philippines	71
Samoa	47

Finals
30 June
Lebanon	64
Philippines	95
Third Place
30 June
Iran	59
Samoa	64

==== Qualification to Semifinals ====
28 June 2024
11:30

Boxscore

Samoa	94–31	Maldives
Scoring by quarter: 20–16, 20–7, 29–4, 25–4
Pts: Sione 24; Rebs: Manumaleuga 11; Asts: Ah-Ken 7		Pts: Ishag 12; Rebs: Firash 7 Asts: Shameem 4

Futian Sports Park, Shenzhen
Referees: Jiang Wenan (CHN), Huang Yun Hsuan (TPE), Ge Qian (CHN)

28 June 2024
14:00

Boxscore

Lebanon	68–41	Hong Kong
Scoring by quarter: 19–9, 8–8, 21–11, 20–13
Pts: Naassan 16; Rebs: El Ghali 16; Asts: Naassan 4		Pts: Cheng, Wong J.S.Y. 8 Rebs: Liu 8 Asts: Wong N.T. 4

Futian Sports Park, Shenzhen
Referees: Sasha Nicholson (NZL), Hwang Jisun (KOR), Via Diah Rohmana (INA)

==== Semifinals ====
29 June 2024
11:30

Boxscore

Philippines	71–47	Samoa
Scoring by quarter: 17–5, 14–18, 18–16, 22–8
Pts: Fajardo 19; Rebs: Ramos, Villanueva 8 Asts: six players 2		Pts: Sione 18; Rebs: Filemu 17; Asts: Reupena 5

Futian Sports Park, Shenzhen
Referees: Kim Bohui (KOR), Ge Qian (CHN), Via Diah Rohmana (INA)

29 June 2024
14:00

Boxscore

Iran	49–64	Lebanon
Scoring by quarter: 9–20, 14–11, 16–17, 10–16
Pts: Zarei 12; Rebs: Lashkaridindarloo 5 Asts: Zarei 5		Pts: El Ghali 22; Rebs: El Ghali 13; Asts: Naassan 6

Futian Sports Park, Shenzhen
Referees: Yu Yijing (CHN), Sasha Nicholson (NZL), Jiang Wenan (CHN)

==== Fifth place game ====
29 June 2024
16:30

Boxscore

Maldives	30–91	Hong Kong
Scoring by quarter: 6–22, 9–26, 6–19, 9–24
Pts: Firash 7 Rebs: Firash 11; Asts: Shameem 5		Pts: Lam 19; Rebs: Iu 13; Asts: Lam 6

Futian Sports Park, Shenzhen
Referees: Calia Hanks (AUS), Miki Ogata (JPN), Yap Khar Yin (MAS)

==== Third place game ====
30 June 2024
11:30

Boxscore

Iran	59–64	Samoa
Scoring by quarter: 8–8, 12–14, 23–21, 16–21
Pts: Lashkaridindarloo 21; Rebs: Houdneh 8 Asts: Zarei 8		Pts: Manumaleuga 22; Rebs: Filemu 20; Asts: Filemu 5

Futian Sports Park, Shenzhen
Referees: Lau Suk Yee (HKG), Huang Yun-Hsuan (TPE), Fang Wenxuan (CHN)

==== Final ====
30 June 2024
14:00

Boxscore

Lebanon	64–95	Philippines
Scoring by quarter: 17–20, 9–33, 20–27, 18–15
Pts: El Ghali 31; Rebs: El Ghali 15; Asts: Naassan 6		Pts: Rodriguez 22; Rebs: Ramos 8 Asts: Panganiban 4

Futian Sports Park, Shenzhen
Referees: Hwang Jisun (KOR), Yuen Chun Yip (HKG), Jiang Wenan (CHN)

== Final standings ==
Qualified for the 2025 FIBA U19 Women's Basketball World Cup
Relegated to Division B of the 2026 FIBA U18 Women's Asia Cup

Rank	Team	Record
1st place, gold medalist(s)	Australia	5–0
2nd place, silver medalist(s)	China	4–1
3rd place, bronze medalist(s)	Japan	4–2
4	South Korea	3–3
5	New Zealand	2–3
6	Chinese Taipei	1–4
7	Malaysia	1–3
8	Indonesia	0–4

Promoted to Division A of the 2026 FIBA U18 Women's Asia Cup

Rank	Team	Record
1	Philippines	4–0
2	Lebanon	3–2
3	Samoa	4–2
4	Iran	3–2
5	Hong Kong	2–3
6	Maldives	0–4
7	Kyrgyzstan	0–3
DQ	Syria	—N/a
