= 2023 FIBA Under-17 Women's Oceania Championship =

International basketball tournament

Tournament details
- Host country: Papua New Guinea
- City: Port Moresby
- Dates: 3–7 October 2023
- Teams: 4 (from 1 confederation)
- Venue: 1 (in 1 host city)

Final positions
- Champions: Australia (10th title)
- Runners-up: New Zealand
- Third place: Samoa

Official website
- www.fiba.basketball

The 2023 FIBA Under-17 Women's Oceania Championship was the 10th edition of the U17/U18 Women's Oceanian basketball championship. The tournament was played in Port Moresby, Papua New Guinea, from 3 to 7 October 2023.

Australia won their tenth straight U17 title after they defeated New Zealand in the final, 87–57.

== Participating teams ==
- Australia
- New Zealand
- Papua New Guinea
- Samoa

== Group phase ==
In this round, the teams played a round-robin tournament in one group. The top team advanced directly to the final; the next two teams advanced to the semifinal; the fourth team advanced to the third place match against the losing semifinalist.

All times are local (Papua New Guinea Standard Time – UTC+10).

Pos	Team	Pld	W	L	PF	PA	PD	Pts	Qualification
1	Australia	3	3	0	309	155	+154	6	Final
2	Samoa	3	2	1	243	188	+55	5	Semifinal
3	New Zealand	3	1	2	238	183	+55	4	Semifinal
4	Papua New Guinea	3	0	3	92	356	−264	3	3rd place match

Source: FIBA

3 October 2023
12:15

Boxscore

New Zealand	59–74	Samoa
Scoring by quarter: 21–18, 16–19, 10–22, 12–15

Port Moresby

3 October 2023
19:00

Boxscore

Papua New Guinea	21–142	Australia
Scoring by quarter: 4–27, 8–39, 7–45, 2–31

Port Moresby

4 October 2023
14:30

Boxscore

Samoa	107–43	Papua New Guinea
Scoring by quarter: 27–8, 25–8, 29–4, 26–23

Port Moresby

4 October 2023
16:45

Boxscore

Australia	81–72	New Zealand
Scoring by quarter: 29–25, 19–8, 16–19, 17–20

Port Moresby

5 October 2023
12:15

Boxscore

Samoa	62–86	Australia
Scoring by quarter: 16–13, 14–26, 11–27, 21–20

Port Moresby

5 October 2023
16:45

Boxscore

Papua New Guinea	28–107	New Zealand
Scoring by quarter: 7–42, 6–31, 8–26, 7–8

Port Moresby

== Playoffs ==
=== Semifinal ===
6 October 2023
18:00

Boxscore

Samoa	52–88	New Zealand
Scoring by quarter: 22–12, 7–19, 7–25, 16–32

Port Moresby

=== 3rd place match ===
7 October 2023
14:30

Boxscore

Samoa	135–47	Papua New Guinea
Scoring by quarter: 26–8, 29–18, 44–13, 36–8

Port Moresby

=== Final ===
7 October 2023
19:00

Boxscore

Australia	87–57	New Zealand
Scoring by quarter: 20–16, 28–17, 17–13, 22–11

Port Moresby

== Final standings ==
Rank	Team
1st place, gold medalist(s)	Australia
2nd place, silver medalist(s)	New Zealand
3rd place, bronze medalist(s)	Samoa
4	Papua New Guinea
