= Deanne Butler =

Australian basketball player

Diamond Valley Eagles
- Title: Head coach
- League: NBL1 South

Personal information
- Born: 11 August 1981 (age 45) Wangaratta, Victoria, Australia
- Listed height: 169 cm (5 ft 7 in)

Career information
- Playing career: 1998–2011
- Position: Point guard
- Coaching career: 2012–present

Career history

Playing
- 1998–2000: Australian Institute of Sport
- 2000: Kilsyth Cobras
- 2000–2001: Dandenong Rangers
- 2001–2003: Frankston Blues
- 2001–2007: Bulleen Boomers
- 2005: Frankston Blues
- 2006–2007: Bendigo Braves
- 2007–2008: Beretta Famila Schio
- 2008–2009: Bendigo Spirit
- 2009: Frankston Blues
- 2009–2011: Sydney Uni Flames

Coaching
- 2012–2013: Bulleen Boomers (Big V)
- 2015: Nunawading Spectres (assistant)
- 2016–2017: Diamond Valley Eagles
- 2018: Diamond Valley Eagles men (assistant)
- 2019–2021: Hume City Broncos
- 2022–present: Diamond Valley Eagles

Career highlights
- EuroCup champion (2008); Serie A champion (2008); 2× SEABL champion (2006, 2007); WNBL champion (1999); 2× SEABL All-Star Five (2002, 2003); SEABL Australian Youth Player of the Year (2003)

Deanne "Dee" Butler (born 11 August 1981) is an Australian basketball coach and former player. She holds dual nationality with Australia and England.

== Early life ==
Butler was born in Wangaratta, Victoria.

== Playing career ==
=== WNBL and Italy ===
Butler debuted in the Women's National Basketball League (WNBL) in the 1998 season with the Australian Institute of Sport (AIS). In the 1998–99 season, she helped the AIS win the WNBL championship. She played a third season for the AIS in 1999–2000 and then joined the Dandenong Rangers for the 2000–01 WNBL season. After one season for Dandenong, she joined the Bulleen Boomers for the 2001–02 WNBL season. She averaged a career-high 12.0 points per game in 2002–03. She had a full ankle reconstruction in February 2004. Butler played her sixth and final season with Bulleen in 2006–07.

For the 2007–08 season, Butler joined Beretta Famila Schio of the Italian Serie A. She helped Schio win the EuroCup, averaging 5.2 points in 13 games.

Butler returned to the WNBL for the 2008–09 season, joining the Bendigo Spirit.

For the 2009–10 WNBL season, Butler joined the Sydney Uni Flames as their starting point guard and averaged 5.3 points, 4.4 assists and 3.3 rebounds per game in the regular season. In the Flames' two playoff games, she averaged 5.5 points, 2.5 assists and 6 rebounds per game. She led the team in assists (102) for the entire season, averaging the fifth best in the league.

Butler returned to the Flames for the 2010–11 season, marking her thirteenth and final WNBL season.

=== SEABL ===
In 2000, Butler played for the Kilsyth Cobras in the South East Australian Basketball League (SEABL).

Between 2001 and 2003, Butler played for the Frankston Blues, where she earned SEABL All-Star Five honours in 2002 and 2003, and was named SEABL Australian Youth Player of the Year in 2003. After not playing in 2004, she returned to the Blues in 2005.

In 2006 and 2007, Butler played for the Bendigo Braves. She helped the Braves win back-to-back SEABL championships. In the 2006 playoffs, she averaged 19 points, 6 rebounds and 5 assists per game.

After not playing in 2008, Butler joined the Frankston Blues for the 2009 SEABL season.

=== National team ===
Butler played for the Australian Opals at the 2005 FIBA Oceania Championship.

== Coaching career ==
=== Big V, SEABL and NBL1 ===
In 2012 and 2013, Butler served as head coach for the Bulleen Boomers in the Big V. She joined the Nunawading Spectres women's team as an assistant coach for the 2015 SEABL season. In 2016 and 2017, she was head coach of the Diamond Valley Eagles women's team in the Big V. In 2018, she served as assistant coach for the Diamond Valley Eagles men's team in the SEABL. In 2019, she served as head coach of the Hume City Broncos women's team in the Big V. She parted ways with the Broncos following the 2021 season. She was appointed head coach of the Diamond Valley Eagles women's team, now in the NBL1 South, for the 2022 NBL1 season. In September 2025, she re-signed as head coach of the Eagles women on a two-year deal.

=== National team ===
Butler served as head coach of the Australia women's national under-19 basketball team at the 2017 FIBA Under-19 Women's Basketball World Cup and the 2019 FIBA Under-19 Women's Basketball World Cup. At the 2019 event, the team finished second after losing to the United States in the final in overtime.

== Personal life ==
Butler has one older sister, Andrea. Butler had two children as of 2018.

As of 2011, Butler was a police officer.
