= Iran women's national under-18 basketball team =

Iran
- FIBA zone: FIBA Asia
- National federation: Islamic Republic of Iran Basketball Federation

U19 World Cup
- Appearances: None

U18 Asia Cup
- Appearances: 1
- Medals: None

U18 Asia Cup Division B
- Appearances: 2
- Medals: None

The Iran women's national under-18 basketball team is a national basketball team of Iran, administered by the Islamic Republic of Iran Basketball Federation. It represents the country in international under-18 women's basketball competitions.

== FIBA Under-18 Women's Asia Cup participations ==
Year	Division A	Division B
1977	4th	
2018		5th
2024		4th

== See also ==
- Iran women's national basketball team
- Iran women's national under-16 basketball team
- Iran men's national under-19 basketball team
