= Tahiti women's national under-17 basketball team =

Tahiti
- FIBA zone: FIBA Oceania
- National federation: Fédération Tahitienne de Basketball

U19 World Cup
- Appearances: None

U18 Asia Cup
- Appearances: None

U17/U18 Oceania Cup
- Appearances: 4
- Medals: (bronze) Bronze: 1 (2019)

The Tahiti women's national under-17 basketball team is a national basketball team of Tahiti, administered by the Fédération Tahitienne de Basketball. It represents the country in international under-17 women's basketball competitions.

== U17/U18 Oceania Cup participations ==
| Year | Result |
|---|---|
| 2014 | 4th |
| 2016 | 6th |
| 2017 | 6th |
| 2019 | 3rd place, bronze medalist(s) |

== See also ==
- Tahiti women's national basketball team
- Tahiti men's national under-17 basketball team
