= 2017 FIBA Under-17 Women's Oceania Championship =

1st Oceanian U17 Women's Basketball Championship

Tournament details
- Host country: Guam
- City: Hagåtña
- Dates: 10–15 July 2017
- Teams: 8 (from 1 confederation)
- Venues: 2 (in 1 host city)

Final positions
- Champions: Australia (8th title)
- Runners-up: New Zealand
- Third place: Samoa

Tournament statistics
- MVP: (Australia) Shyla Heal
- Top scorer: (Australia) Goodchild (23.0)
- Top rebounds: (Samoa) F. Ropati (12.6)
- Top assists: (New Zealand) O'Neill (5.6)
- PPG (Team): Australia (135.0)
- RPG (Team): Australia (60.8)
- APG (Team): Australia (30.0)

Official website
- 2017 FIBA U-17 Oceania Women's Championship

The 2017 FIBA Under-17 Women's Oceania Championship was an international under-17 women's basketball tournament held from 10 to 15 July 2017 by FIBA Oceania in Hagåtña, Guam. Australia defeated New Zealand in the Finals, 81–60, to take the gold medal and their eighth consecutive U17 title. Both teams qualified for the 2018 FIBA Under-18 Women's Asian Championship which in turn was the qualifying tournament for the 2019 FIBA Under-19 Women's Basketball World Cup.

== Hosts selection ==
On 23 September 2016, FIBA Oceania announced during their Board Meeting that Guam was to host the tournament. The Calvo Field House of the University of Guam in Hagåtña was the main venue for the championship.

== Participating teams ==
On 13 April 2017, the following teams confirmed their participation to the main tournament:

- Australia
- Guam
- Marshall Islands
- New Caledonia
- New Zealand
- Palau
- Samoa
- Tahiti

== Draw ==
On 12 May 2017, the draw for the main tournament was held in Hagåtña, Guam.

== Group phase ==
All times are in Chamorro Time Zone (UTC+10:00)

=== Group A ===
Pos	Team	Pld	W	L	PF	PA	PD	Pts	Qualification
1	Australia	3	3	0	440	43	+397	6	Advance to Semifinals
2	Samoa	3	2	1	237	164	+73	5	Advance to Semifinals
3	Tahiti	3	1	2	155	286	−131	4	Advance to Division B Gold Medal Game
4	Marshall Islands	3	0	3	48	387	−339	3	Advance to Division B Bronze Medal Game

Source: FIBA

10 July
13:00

Box Scores

Australia	163–13	Tahiti
Scoring by quarter: 39–1, 48–3, 40–6, 36–3
Pts: Goodchild 28; Rebs: Puli 9 Asts: McDowell-White, Clarke 6		Pts: Tavanae 4 Rebs: 6 players 1 Asts: Stein, Teua 1

Calvo Field House, University of Guam, Mangilao

10 July
18:00

Box Scores

Samoa	120–12	Marshall Islands
Scoring by quarter: 26–4, 41–0, 23–5, 30–3
Pts: F.Ropati 21; Rebs: Hettig 12; Asts: F. Ropati 4		Pts: E. Joseph, Slinger 3 Rebs: Slinger, Ackley 5 Asts: E. Joseph 1

Father Dueñas Memorial School, Mangilao

11 July
09:00

Box Scores

Tahiti	41–90	Samoa
Scoring by quarter: 8–20, 7–24, 9–17, 17–29
Pts: Tavanae 15; Rebs: Richmond 6 Asts: Garel-Laurin, Teriierooiterai 3		Pts: F. Ropati 21; Rebs: F. Ropati 21; Asts: Tamapua Muaulu 5

Calvo Field House, University of Guam, Mangilao

11 July
20:00

Box Scores

Australia	166–3	Marshall Islands
Scoring by quarter: 47–0, 38–0, 42–3, 39–0
Pts: Puli 27; Rebs: Bourne 9 Asts: McDowell-White, Oliver 5		Pts: Andrike 3 Rebs: 5 players 1 Asts: 0

Father Dueñas Memorial School, Mangilao

12 July
11:00

Box Scores

Marshall Islands	33–101	Tahiti
Scoring by quarter: 4–24, 9–24, 6–24, 14–29
Pts: E. Joseph 6 Rebs: A. Joseph, Philippo 7 Asts: Andrike 3		Pts: Salem 18; Rebs: Stein 13; Asts: Garel-Laurin 4

Calvo Field House, University of Guam, Mangilao

12 July
13:00

Box Scores

Samoa	27–111	Australia
Scoring by quarter: 8–25, 8–31, 3–30, 8–25
Pts: Tamapua Muaulu 11; Rebs: F. Ropati 6 Asts: Tamapua Muaulu, Hettig, L. Ropati 1		Pts: Goodchild 21; Rebs: Bourne 11; Asts: Goodchild 6

Calvo Field House, University of Guam, Mangilao

=== Group B ===
Pos	Team	Pld	W	L	PF	PA	PD	Pts	Qualification
1	New Zealand	3	3	0	384	73	+311	6	Advance to Semifinals
2	Guam (H)	3	2	1	209	244	−35	5	Advance to Semifinals
3	New Caledonia	3	1	2	220	218	+2	4	Advance to Division B Gold Medal Game
4	Palau	3	0	3	71	349	−278	3	Advance to Division B Bronze Medal Game

Source: FIBA
(H) Hosts

10 July
17:00

Box Scores

Guam	34–139	New Zealand
Scoring by quarter: 6–37, 6–28, 12–27, 10–47
Pts: Perez 11; Rebs: San Nicolas, Ogo 4 Asts: Miranda 2		Pts: Book, Tipene, Tini 20; Rebs: Book 6 Asts: Leger-Walker 6

Calvo Field House, University of Guam, Mangilao

10 July
20:00

Box Scores

New Caledonia	118–29	Palau
Scoring by quarter: 26–7, 25–12, 38–5, 29–5
Pts: Peu 21; Rebs: Qenenoj 12; Asts: Qenenoj 5		Pts: Ngiralmau 8 Rebs: Sugiyama 5 Asts: Ngiralmau 3

Father Dueñas Memorial School, Mangilao

11 July
13:00

Box Scores

New Zealand	110–31	New Caledonia
Scoring by quarter: 33–9, 32–10, 26–5, 19–7
Pts: Hippolite, Whittaker 16; Rebs: O'Neill 18; Asts: O'Neill 13		Pts: Canaldo 7 Rebs: Tartas, Robson 4 Asts: Robson 2

Calvo Field House, University of Guam, Mangilao

11 July
19:00

Box Scores

Palau	34–96	Guam
Scoring by quarter: 2–24, 1–39, 16–19, 15–14
Pts: Sugiyama 16; Rebs: Sugiyama 19; Asts: Sugiyama 2		Pts: San Nicolas 24; Rebs: San Nicolas 18; Asts: Duenas 5

Calvo Field House, University of Guam, Mangilao

12 July
18:00

Box Scores

New Zealand	135–8	Palau
Scoring by quarter: 62–0, 24–4, 27–2, 22–2
Pts: Tipene 26; Rebs: Tipene 8 Asts: O'Neill, Rangi, Mafua 5		Pts: Ngiralmau 3 Rebs: Sugiyama 3 Asts: Ngirangesil 1

Father Dueñas Memorial School, Mangilao

12 July
19:00

Box Scores

New Caledonia	71–79	Guam
Scoring by quarter: 18–20, 15–20, 21–15, 17–24
Pts: Canaldo 13; Rebs: Qenenoj 11; Asts: Qenenoj 4		Pts: San Nicolas 29; Rebs: San Nicolas 22; Asts: Perez 6

Calvo Field House, University of Guam, Mangilao

== Final phase ==
=== Division B ===
==== Bronze medal game ====
13 July
13:00

Box Scores

Marshall Islands	59–42	Palau
Scoring by quarter: 14–16, 16–4, 12–7, 17–15
Pts: Philippo 13; Rebs: Philippo, Ratidara 15; Asts: Slinger 3		Pts: Sugiyama 22; Rebs: Sugiyama 17; Asts: Ngirangesil 2

Calvo Field House, University of Guam, Mangilao

==== Gold medal game ====
13 July
17:00

Box Scores

Tahiti	68–73 (OT)	New Caledonia
Scoring by quarter: 15–6, 15–18, 13–16, 14–17, Overtime: 11–16
Pts: Garel-Laurin 16; Rebs: Teriierooiterai 13; Asts: Teriierooiterai, Garel-Laurin 3		Pts: Puleoto 22; Rebs: Kamodji 16; Asts: Kamodji 4

Calvo Field House, University of Guam, Mangilao

=== Division A ===
Semifinals
14 July
Australia	154
Guam	12
14 July
New Zealand	81
Samoa	36

Final
15 July
Australia	81
New Zealand	60
3rd place
15 July
Guam	58
Samoa	88

==== Semifinals ====
14 July
13:00

Box Scores

Australia	154–12	Guam
Scoring by quarter: 40–0, 40–2, 31–7, 43–3
Pts: Clarke 28; Rebs: Bourne 15; Asts: Clarke 7		Pts: Senne 4 Rebs: San Nicolas, Gandaoli 2 Asts: Estoy, San Nicolas 1

Calvo Field House, University of Guam, Mangilao

14 July
17:00

Box Scores

New Zealand	81–36	Samoa
Scoring by quarter: 11–13, 24–6, 27–4, 19–13
Pts: Whittaker 22; Rebs: O'Neill, Nisbet 12; Asts: Leger-Walker 6		Pts: F. Ropati 11; Rebs: F. Ropati 12; Asts: L. Ropati 2

Calvo Field House, University of Guam, Mangilao

==== Bronze medal game ====
15 July
12:00

Box Scores

Guam	58–88	Samoa
Scoring by quarter: 17–27, 17–25, 10–19, 14–17
Pts: San Nicolas 18; Rebs: San Nicolas 8 Asts: 4 players 2		Pts: F. Ropati 32; Rebs: F. Ropati 17; Asts: Hettig, L. Ropati 3

Calvo Field House, University of Guam, Mangilao

==== Gold medal game ====
15 July
17:00

Box Scores

Australia	81–60	New Zealand
Scoring by quarter: 22–23, 17–9, 20–14, 22–14
Pts: Bourne 20; Rebs: D'Angelo 11; Asts: Heal 4		Pts: Leger-Walker 21; Rebs: Mafua 6 Asts: Leger-Walker 4

Calvo Field House, University of Guam, Mangilao

== Final standings ==
=== Division A ===
Qualified for the 2018 FIBA Under-18 Women's Asian Championship Division A
Qualified for the 2018 FIBA Under-18 Women's Asian Championship Division B

#	Team	Pld	W	L	PF	PA	PD
1st place, gold medalist(s)	Australia	5	5	0	675	115	+560
2nd place, silver medalist(s)	New Zealand	5	4	1	525	190	+335
3rd place, bronze medalist(s)	Samoa	5	3	2	361	303	+58
4th	Guam	5	2	3	279	314	–35

=== Division B ===
#	Team	Pld	W	L	PF	PA	PD
1st place, gold medalist(s)	New Caledonia	4	2	2	293	286	+7
2nd place, silver medalist(s)	Tahiti	4	1	3	223	359	–136
3rd place, bronze medalist(s)	Marshall Islands	4	1	3	107	429	–322
4th	Palau	4	0	4	113	408	–295

== Awards ==
The All-Star Five were announced on 15 July 2017.

All-Star Five
Guards	Forwards	Center
(New Zealand) Charlisse Leger-Walker (Australia) Miela Goodchild	(Australia) Emma Clarke (Australia) Isabelle Bourne	(Samoa) Frances Ropati
Championship Game MVP: (Australia) Shyla Heal
