= Fiji women's national under-18 basketball team =

Basketball team in Fiji for women under 18

Fiji
- FIBA zone: FIBA Oceania
- National federation: Fiji Amateur Basketball Federation

U19 World Cup
- Appearances: None

U18 Asia Cup
- Appearances: None

U17/U18 Oceania Cup
- Appearances: 3
- Medals: None

The Fiji women's national under-17 and under-18 basketball team is a national basketball team of Fiji, administered by the Fiji Amateur Basketball Federation. It represents the country in international under-17 and under-18 women's basketball competitions.

== FIBA U17 Women's Oceania Cup participations ==
Year	Result
2014	7th
2016	5th
2025	5th

== See also ==
- Fiji women's national basketball team
- Fiji women's national under-15 basketball team
- Fiji men's national under-18 basketball team
