= Guam women's national under-18 basketball team =

Guam
- FIBA zone: FIBA Oceania
- National federation: Guam Basketball Confederation

U19 World Cup
- Appearances: None

U18 Asia Cup Division A
- Appearances: None

U18 Asia Cup Division B
- Appearances: 1
- Medals: None

U17/U18 Oceania Cup
- Appearances: 5
- Medals: (bronze) Bronze: 1 (2014)

The Guam women's national under-17 and under-18 basketball team is a national basketball team of Guam, administered by the Guam Basketball Confederation. It represents the country in international under-17 and under-18 women's basketball competitions.

== FIBA U17 Women's Oceania Cup participations ==
Year	Result
2014	3rd place, bronze medalist(s)
2016	8th
2017	4th
2019	6th
2025	6th

== FIBA Under-18 Women's Asia Cup participations ==
Year	Division A	Division B
2018	—N/a	8th

== See also ==
- Guam women's national under-15 and under-16 basketball team
- Guam men's national under-17 and under-18 basketball team
