= FIBA U17 Women's Oceania Cup =

Under-17 continental basketball championship

- Most recent season or competition: 2025 FIBA U17 Women's Oceania Cup
- Sport: Basketball
- Founded: 2004; 22 years ago
- Organizing body: FIBA Oceania
- No. of teams: 4–8
- Continent: Oceania
- Most recent champion: Australia (11th title)
- Most titles: Australia (11 titles)
- Qualification: FIBA U18 Women's Asia Cup
- Related competitions: FIBA U15 Women's Oceania Cup
- Website: www.fiba.basketball/history

The FIBA U17 Women's Oceania Cup, formerly the FIBA Under-17 Women's Oceania Championship, is an international junior women's basketball tournament in the FIBA Oceania zone, inaugurated in 2004. The current champions are Australia.

Before 2017, the competition was known as the FIBA Oceania Under-18 Championship for Women, which was a qualifier for the FIBA U19 Women's World Cup. Now it is an under-17 competition for Oceanian teams to qualify for the FIBA U18 Women's Asia Cup (from which they can qualify for the World Cup).

== Summary ==
=== Under-18 era ===
Year	Hosts	Final			Third place match		
Year	Hosts	Champions	Score	Runners-up	Third place	Score	Fourth place
2004; Details	(Australia); Melbourne	Australia	2–0	New Zealand	No other teams competed		
2006; Details	(Australia) / (New Zealand)	Australia	3–0	New Zealand	No other teams competed		
2008; Details	(Australia); Adelaide	Australia	3–0	New Zealand	No other teams competed		
2010; Details	(New Zealand); Palmerston North	Australia	3–0	New Zealand	No other teams competed		
2012; Details	(New Zealand); Porirua	Australia	3–0	New Zealand	No other teams competed		
2014; Details	(Fiji); Suva	Australia	98–65	New Zealand	Guam	54–48	Tahiti
2016; Details	(Fiji); Suva	Australia	107–52	New Zealand	Samoa	75–65	New Caledonia

=== Under-17 era ===
Year	Hosts	Final			Third place match		
Year	Hosts	Champions	Score	Runners-up	Third place	Score	Fourth place
2017; Details	(Guam); Hagåtña	Australia	81–60	New Zealand	Samoa	88–58	Guam
2019; Details	(New Caledonia); Nouméa	Australia	88–41	New Zealand	Tahiti	62–56	Samoa
2021	Cancelled due to COVID-19 pandemic in Oceania						
2023; Details	(Papua New Guinea); Port Moresby	Australia	87–57	New Zealand	Samoa	135–47	Papua New Guinea
2025; Details	(Samoa); Apia	Australia	112–59	New Zealand	Cook Islands	58–54	Samoa

== Medal table ==
Rank	Nation	Gold	Silver	Bronze	Total
1	Australia	11	0	0	11
2	New Zealand	0	11	0	11
3	Samoa	0	0	3	3
4	Cook Islands	0	0	1	1
4	Guam	0	0	1	1
4	Tahiti	0	0	1	1
Totals (6 entries)		11	11	6	28

== Participation details ==
Team	(Australia) 2004	(Australia) 2006	(Australia) 2008	(New Zealand) 2010	(New Zealand) 2012	(Fiji) 2014	(Fiji) 2016	(Guam) 2017	(New Caledonia) 2019	(Papua New Guinea) 2023	(Samoa) 2025	Total
American Samoa						10th						1
Australia	1st	1st	1st	1st	1st	1st	1st	1st	1st	1st	1st	11
Cook Islands									8th		3rd	2
Fiji						7th	5th				5th	3
Guam						3rd	8th	4th	6th		6th	5
Marshall Islands								7th				1
New Caledonia						5th	4th	5th	5th			4
New Zealand	2nd	2nd	2nd	2nd	2nd	2nd	2nd	2nd	2nd	2nd	2nd	11
Palau								8th				1
Papua New Guinea						6th	7th		7th	4th		4
Samoa						9th	3rd	3rd	4th	3rd	4th	6
Solomon Islands						8th						1
Tahiti						4th	6th	6th	3rd			4
Total	2	2	2	2	2	10	8	8	8	4	6	
