= Tegan Graham =

New Zealand basketball player (born 1997)

Grindavík
- Position: Guard
- League: Úrvalsdeild kvenna

Personal information
- Born: 2 August 1997 (age 29) Walnut Creek, California, U.S.
- Listed height: 6 ft 0 in (1.83 m)

Career information
- High school: Wellington Girls' College (Wellington, New Zealand)
- College: Colgate (2016–2020); BYU (2020–2022)
- Playing career: 2014–present

Career history
- 2014–2015: Capital Flyers
- 2023: Tokomanawa Queens
- 2023–2024: Södertälje BBK
- 2024–2025: VfL VIACTIV-AstroLadies Bochum
- 2025–2026: Perth Lynx
- 2026–present: Grindavík

Career highlights
- German 2.Bundesliga champion (2025); German 2.Bundesliga MVP (2025); Swedish League champion (2024); Swedish Cup winner (2024)

Tegan Ewing Graham (born 2 August 1997) is a New Zealand professional basketball player Grindavík of the Úrvalsdeild kvenna. Born in the United States, she represents the New Zealand national team and also holds British citizenship. Graham grew up in Wellington, New Zealand, where she attended Wellington Girls' College, before returning to the U.S. and playing college basketball for the Colgate Raiders and BYU Cougars between 2016 and 2022.

== Early life and career ==
Graham was born in Walnut Creek, California. She was raised in Wellington, New Zealand, where she was mentored by well-known New Zealand basketball identity, Kenny McFadden. She attended Wellington Girls' College, where she served as team captain of the basketball team for three seasons and helped the squad to consecutive second-place finishes at the National Secondary Schools Basketball championships. She also played for the school's netball team.

In 2014 and 2015, Graham played for the Capital Flyers in New Zealand's Women's Basketball Championship (WBC). She helped the Flyers win the 2014 WBC plate final alongside Stella Beck.

== College career ==
=== Colgate (2016–2020) ===
Graham moved to the United States in 2016 to play college basketball for the Colgate Raiders.

In the 2016–17 season, Graham played in nine games with six starts before suffering season-ending injury. She averaged 4.1 points and 2.6 rebounds per game.

As a sophomore in 2017–18, Graham played 30 games and made 17 starts, averaging 5.5 points and 3.4 rebounds per game. She scored a season-high 18 points against Siena.

As a junior in 2018–19, Graham played 29 games and made 17 starts, averaging 7.7 points and 2.4 rebounds per game. She scored a career-high 24 points against Army, and followed that with 23 points against Holy Cross and 20 points against Lafayette, becoming the first Raider with three straight 20-point games since Melanie Cargle in 2006–07.

As a senior in 2019–20, Graham played 30 games and made seven starts, averaging 9.2 points, 2.6 rebounds and 2.3 assists per game. She had 13 games scoring in double figures, with a season-high 22 points against Loyola. As team captain, she helped the Raiders finish with a 19–11 record, which marked the second-most wins in program history.

During her four years at Colgate, Graham was on the Patriot League All-Academic Honor Roll for three seasons and gained a Bachelor of Arts in political science.

=== BYU (2020–2022) ===
After graduating from Colgate, Graham transferred to Brigham Young. She initially joined the BYU Cougars with one more year of eligibility, but later gained another season due to the COVID bonus campaign allowed by the NCAA.

With the BYU Cougars in the 2020–21 season, Graham had a .468 3-point percentage that tied for the highest in a single season in program history and led the West Coast Conference (WCC) while ranking third nationally in the category. She was subsequently named All-WCC Honorable Mention.

In the 2021–22 season, Graham averaged 10 points, 3.2 rebounds and 1.5 steals, in addition to leading the WCC in total assists (144) and assists per game (4.8). She subsequently earned All-WCC Honorable Mention for the second straight year. She set a BYU record with 10 made 3-pointers against Oklahoma on 10 December 2021.

Graham made 153 NCAA Division I appearances, the most games by a New Zealander (male or female) at the Division I level.

During her two years at BYU, Graham undertook a Masters in Communications, where she wrote a paper on the disparity in resources between women's and men's NCAA athletics programmes.

== Professional career ==
Graham made her professional debut in 2023 with the Tokomanawa Queens of the Tauihi Basketball Aotearoa. She helped the Queens reach the Tauihi final, where she scored 17 points in a 98–72 loss to the Northern Kāhu. In 14 games, she averaged 8.2 points, 3.6 rebounds and 1.6 assists per game.

For the 2023–24 season, Graham joined Swedish team Södertälje BBK of the Basketligan dam. The team won the league championship and the Swedish Cup, and in 29 games, she averaged 8.5 points, 3.0 rebounds and 3.6 assists per game.

For the 2024–25 season, Graham joined German team VfL VIACTIV-AstroLadies Bochum. She helped the team win the German 2.Bundesliga championship and in 26 games, she averaged 17.3 points, 7.4 rebounds, 5.6 assists and 2.3 steals per game. She was named league MVP.

On 7 August 2025, Graham signed with the Perth Lynx of the Women's National Basketball League (WNBL) in Australia for the 2025–26 season. She helped the Lynx reach the WNBL grand final series, where they lost 2–0 to the Townsville Fire.

In July 2026, Graham signed with Grindavík of the Úrvalsdeild kvenna.

== National team career ==
Graham played for New Zealand at the 2013 FIBA Oceania U16 Championship and 2014 FIBA Oceania U18 Championship.

In May 2025, Graham debuted for the New Zealand Tall Ferns during the Trans-Tasman Throwdown series against Australia.

== Personal life ==
Graham is the daughter of Steven Graham and Tamsin Ewing. She has two brothers, including a twin brother, Shay, who attended Onslow College and was a talented basketballer and made the North Island rowing team in 2014. Her older brother, Doran, also played basketball.

Graham holds New Zealand, American and British citizenship.
