= Maldives women's national under-18 basketball team =

Maldives
- FIBA zone: FIBA Asia
- National federation: Maldives Basketball Association

U19 World Cup
- Appearances: None

U18 Asia Cup
- Appearances: None

U18 Asia Cup Division B
- Appearances: 2
- Medals: None

The Maldives women's national under-18 basketball team is a national basketball team of the Maldives, administered by the Maldives Basketball Association. It represents the country in international under-18 women's basketball competitions.

== FIBA Under-18 Women's Asia Cup participations ==
Year	Result in Division B
2022	8th
2024	6th

== See also ==
- Maldives women's national under-16 basketball team
- Maldives men's national basketball team
