= Lebanon women's national under-18 basketball team =

Lebanon
- FIBA ranking: 82 ▼6 (Dec 2025)
- Joined FIBA: 1947
- FIBA zone: FIBA Asia
- National federation: FLB
- Coach: Paul Coughter

U19 World Cup
- Appearances: None

U18 Asia Cup Division A
- Appearances: None

U18 Asia Cup Division B
- Appearances: 2
- Medals: Gold: 1 (2026); Silver: 1 (2024)
| Home | Away |

The Lebanon women's national under-18 basketball team is the junior women's national basketball team, administered by Lebanese Basketball Federation, that represents Lebanon in international under-18 women's basketball competitions.

== History ==
At the 2024 FIBA U18 Women's Asia Cup Division B, the team reached the finals but finished as runners-up, narrowly missing out on promotion to Division A. They found redemption in the 2026 tournament, advancing to the finals once again and capturing the Division B title to successfully secure their spot in Division A of 2028 FIBA U18 Women's Asia Cup.

== Tournament records ==
=== U18 Asia Cup ===
FIBA U18 Women's Asia Cup
| Year | Div | Pos | Pld | W | L |
|---|---|---|---|---|---|
| (China) 2024 | B | 2nd | 5 | 3 | 2 |
| (Thailand) 2026 | B | 1st | 5 | 5 | 0 |
| Total | | | 10 | 8 | 2 |

== Statistics ==
=== U18 Asia Cup ===
Lebanon Statistical Leaders
| Event | PPG | RPG | APG | SPG | BPG | EPG |
|---|---|---|---|---|---|---|
| (China) 2024 | R. El Ghali (19.6) | R. El Ghali (14.2) | M. Naassan (4.8) | M. Naassan (2.8) | M. Naassan (1.6) | R. El Ghali (28.6) |
| (Thailand) 2026 | L. Al Nakib (18.6) | K. Kamaz (8.6) | N. Hoteit (4.8) | J. El Harake (4.2) | L. Al Nakib (1.6), E. Abou Jaoude (1.6) | L. Al Nakib (17.6) |

== See also ==
- Sport in Lebanon
- Lebanon women's national basketball team
- Lebanon women's national under-16 basketball team
- Lebanon men's national basketball team
- Lebanon men's national under-19 basketball team
- Lebanon men's national under-17 basketball team
