= Australia women's national under-19 basketball team =

Australia
- FIBA ranking: 11th
- FIBA zone: FIBA Oceania
- National federation: Basketball Australia
- Coach: David Herbert
- Nickname: Gems

U19 World Cup
- Appearances: 17
- Medals: Gold: 1 (1993); Silver: 3 (1997, 2019, 2021, 2025); Bronze: 3 (1989, 2013, 2015)

U18 Asia Cup
- Appearances: 4
- Medals: Gold: 3 (2022, 2024, 2026); Bronze: 1 (2018)

U17/U18 Oceania Cup
- Appearances: 11
- Medals: Gold: 11 (2004, 2006, 2008, 2010, 2012, 2014, 2016, 2017, 2019, 2023, 2025)

The Australia women's national under-19 basketball team is the women's basketball team representing Australia for all international under-19, under-18, and under-17 women's basketball competitions, including the U19 World Cup, U18 Asia Cup, and the U17 Oceania Cup, administered by Basketball Australia. The team is nicknamed the Gems, an abbreviation for the word gemstone. In 1993, the Gems (which won a gold medal) won the Australian Institute of Sport Athlete (team) of the Year.

== Results ==
=== U19 World Cup ===
The first FIBA U19 World Championship was in 1985, and the Gems have participated in every tournament to date. From 1985, the under-19 World Championships were held every four years. From 2005, they are held every two years.

U19 World Cup
Year	Round	Position	Pld	W	L	Coach
(United States) 1985	Classification round	6th of 10	6	2	4	
(Spain) 1989	Third place	3rd of 12	7	5	2	
(South Korea) 1993	Champions	1st of 12	7	7	0	
(Brazil) 1997	Runners-up	2nd of 12	7	5	2	
(Czech Republic) 2001	Fourth place	4th of 12	7	5	2	
(Tunisia) 2005	Quarterfinals	7th of 12	8	5	3	
(Slovakia) 2007	Quarterfinals	5th of 16	9	7	2	
(Thailand) 2009	Quarterfinals	5th of 16	9	8	1	
(Chile) 2011	Fourth place	4th of 16	9	6	3	Chambers
(Lithuania) 2013	Third place	3rd of 16	9	7	2	Chambers
(Russia) 2015	Third place	3rd of 16	7	6	1	Goriss
(Italy) 2017	Quarterfinals	6th of 16	7	4	3	Butler
(Thailand) 2019	Runners-up	2nd of 16	7	5	2	Butler
(Hungary) 2021	Runners-up	2nd of 16	7	5	2	Herbert
(Spain) 2023	Round of 16	9th of 16	7	4	3	Herbert
(Czech Republic) 2025	Runners-up	2nd of 16	6	5	1	Camino
(China) 2027	Qualified					
Total			119	86	33	

=== U18 Asia Cup ===
Year	Result
2018	3rd place, bronze medalist(s)
2022	1st place, gold medalist(s)
2024	1st place, gold medalist(s)
2026	1st place, gold medalist(s)

=== U17/U18 Oceania Cup ===
Year	Result
2004	1st place, gold medalist(s)
2006	1st place, gold medalist(s)
2008	1st place, gold medalist(s)
2010	1st place, gold medalist(s)
2012	1st place, gold medalist(s)
2014	1st place, gold medalist(s)
2016	1st place, gold medalist(s)
2017	1st place, gold medalist(s)
2019	1st place, gold medalist(s)
2023	1st place, gold medalist(s)
2025	1st place, gold medalist(s)

== Statistics ==
Australia U-19 statistical leaders
Event	PPG	RPG	APG	SPG	BPG
(United States) 1985	S. Gorman (12.5)	–	–	–	–
(Soviet Union) 1989	S. Gorman (23.1)	–	–	–	–
(South Korea) 1993	M. Brogan (18.3)	–	–	–	–
(Brazil) 1997	C. Emeagi (15.0)	L. Jackson (9.9)	K. Veal (2.3)	N. Lindsay (0.4)	–
(Czech Republic) 2001	S. Hammonds (17.9)	S. Hammonds (7.7)	J. Mahony (3.3)	S. Hammonds (2.2)	L. Summerton (0.3)
(Tunisia) 2005	R. Camino (21.6)	R. Camino (8.1)	J-L. Samuels (1.8)	R. Camino (1.5)	J-L. Samuels (1.0)
(Slovakia) 2007	A. Bishop (12.8)	A. Bishop (10.7)	N. Hunt (2.7)	N. Hunt (2.3)	C. Francis (1.5)
(Thailand) 2009	E. Cambage (20.4)	E. Cambage (6.8)	T. Madgen (2.2)	R. Jarry (1.4)	E. Cambage (2.4)
(Chile) 2011	T. Roberts (15.9)	T. Roberts (8.4)	R. Cole (6.0)	R. Allen (2.4)	G. Tippett (1.0)
(Lithuania) 2013	C. Mijović (14.4)	S. Talbot (7.8)	S. Talbot (4.9)	C. Samuels (1.8)	C. Mijović (1.3)
(Russia) 2015	A. Smith (12.6)	A. Sharp (7.0)	K. Wallace (3.6)	A. Smith (1.6)	A. Smith (2.7)
(Italy) 2017	E. Magbegor (16.1)	A. Maley (10.7)	M. Rocci (4.0)	E. Magbegor (2.0)	E. Magbegor (1.5)
(Thailand) 2019	A. Fowler (9.0)	A. Fowler (10.0)	J. Shelley (3.7)	J. Shelley (1.7)	I. Anstey (0.9)

== See also ==
- Australia men's national basketball team
- Australia women's national basketball team
- Australia women's national under-17 basketball team
- Australia men's national under-19 basketball team
- Australia men's national under-17 basketball team
- Basketball Australia
- FIBA World Rankings
- Timeline of women's basketball history
- Women's National Basketball League
- Australian Basketball Hall of Fame
