= 2025 FIBA U17 Women's Oceania Cup =

International youth basketball tournament

Tournament details
- Host country: Samoa
- City: Apia
- Dates: 8–13 December 2025
- Teams: 6 (from 1 confederation)
- Venue: 1 (in 1 host city)

Final positions
- Champions: Australia (11th title)
- Runners-up: New Zealand
- Third place: Cook Islands

Official website
- www.fiba.basketball

The 2025 FIBA U17 Women's Oceania Cup was the 11th edition of the Oceanian basketball championship for under-17 women's national teams. The tournament was played in Apia, Samoa, from 8 to 13 December 2025.

Australia won their 11th straight title as they defeated New Zealand in the final, 112–59.

== Participating teams ==
- Australia
- Cook Islands
- Fiji
- Guam
- New Zealand
- Samoa

== Group phase ==
In this round, the teams were drawn into two groups of three. Both groups were played in a round-robin format. The group winners advanced to the semifinals, but before that, they played a SF-seeding match. The other teams advanced to the quarterfinals.

All times are local (Time in Samoa; UTC+13).

=== Group A ===
Pos	Team	Pld	W	L	PF	PA	PD	Pts	Qualification
1	Australia	2	2	0	242	44	+198	4	SF-seeding match
2	Guam	2	1	1	82	189	−107	3	Quarterfinals
3	Fiji	2	0	2	90	181	−91	2	Quarterfinals

Source: FIBA

8 December 2025
16:00

Boxscore

Fiji	62–66	Guam
Scoring by quarter: 16–19, 11–29, 21–10, 14–8

Tuanaimato Gym 2, Apia

9 December 2025
13:30

Boxscore

Australia	115–28	Fiji
Scoring by quarter: 21–11, 34–8, 21–4, 39–5

Tuanaimato Gym 2, Apia

10 December 2025
11:00

Boxscore

Guam	16–127	Australia
Scoring by quarter: 2–36, 8–26, 3–33, 3–32

Tuanaimato Gym 2, Apia

=== Group B ===
Pos	Team	Pld	W	L	PF	PA	PD	Pts	Qualification
1	New Zealand	2	2	0	152	109	+43	4	SF-seeding match
2	Samoa (H)	2	1	1	125	116	+9	3	Quarterfinals
3	Cook Islands	2	0	2	117	169	−52	2	Quarterfinals

Source: FIBA
(H) Hosts

8 December 2025
18:30

Boxscore

Cook Islands	59–74	Samoa
Scoring by quarter: 17–26, 13–18, 17–16, 12–14

Tuanaimato Gym 2, Apia

9 December 2025
16:00

Boxscore

New Zealand	95–58	Cook Islands
Scoring by quarter: 30–15, 25–8, 15–19, 25–16

Tuanaimato Gym 2, Apia

10 December 2025
18:30

Boxscore

Samoa	51–57	New Zealand
Scoring by quarter: 9–18, 14–17, 14–12, 14–10

Tuanaimato Gym 2, Apia

== Playoffs ==
=== Brackets ===
SF-seeding match
A1	Australia	98
B1	New Zealand	48

Quarterfinals
A2	Guam	53
B3	Cook Islands	62
A3	Fiji	50
B2	Samoa	78

Semifinals
A1	Australia	96
B3	Cook Islands	29
B1	New Zealand	73
B2	Samoa	56

Final
A1	Australia	112
B1	New Zealand	59
3rd place match
B3	Cook Islands	58
B2	Samoa	54

5th place match
A2	Guam	51
A3	Fiji	75

=== SF-seeding match ===
11 December 2025
17:30

Boxscore

Australia	98–48	New Zealand
Scoring by quarter: 24–12, 38–10, 16–12, 20–14

Tuanaimato Gym 2, Apia

=== Quarterfinals ===
11 December 2025
13:00

Boxscore

Guam	53–62	Cook Islands
Scoring by quarter: 18–9, 8–16, 12–20, 15–17

Tuanaimato Gym 2, Apia

11 December 2025
15:30

Boxscore

Fiji	50–78	Samoa
Scoring by quarter: 15–17, 9–26, 14–14, 12–21

Tuanaimato Gym 2, Apia

==== 5th place match ====
12 December 2025
11:00

Boxscore

Guam	51–75	Fiji
Scoring by quarter: 14–14, 8–19, 18–22, 11–20

Tuanaimato Gym 2, Apia

=== Semifinals ===
12 December 2025
13:00

Boxscore

Australia	96–29	Cook Islands
Scoring by quarter: 21–12, 25–0, 23–7, 27–10

Tuanaimato Gym 2, Apia

12 December 2025
15:30

Boxscore

New Zealand	73–56	Samoa
Scoring by quarter: 13–14, 22–6, 17–16, 21–20

Tuanaimato Gym 2, Apia

==== 3rd place match ====
13 December 2025
10:00

Boxscore

Cook Islands	58–54	Samoa
Scoring by quarter: 18–12, 13–9, 14–15, 13–18

Tuanaimato Gym 2, Apia

==== Final ====
13 December 2025
15:00

Boxscore

Australia	112–59	New Zealand
Scoring by quarter: 26–11, 25–14, 36–15, 25–19

Tuanaimato Gym 2, Apia

== Final standings ==
Rank	Team
1st place, gold medalist(s)	Australia
2nd place, silver medalist(s)	New Zealand
3rd place, bronze medalist(s)	Cook Islands
4	Samoa
5	Fiji
6	Guam
