= Samoa women's national under-17 and under-18 basketball team =

Youth national basketball team

Samoa
- Joined FIBA: 1982
- FIBA zone: FIBA Oceania
- National federation: Samoa Basketball Association

U19 World Cup
- Appearances: None

U18 Asia Cup
- Appearances: None

U18 Asia Cup Division B
- Appearances: 3
- Medals: (bronze) Bronze: 1 (2024)

U17/U18 Oceania Cup
- Appearances: 6
- Medals: (bronze) Bronze: 3 (2016, 2017, 2023)

The Samoa women's national under-17 and under-18 basketball team is the junior women's national basketball team of Samoa, governed by Samoa Basketball Association. It represents the country in international under-17 and under-18 women's basketball competitions.

== U17/U18 Oceania Cup participations ==
Year	Result
2014	9th
2016	3rd place, bronze medalist(s)
2017	3rd place, bronze medalist(s)
2019	4th
2023	3rd place, bronze medalist(s)
2025	4th

== U18 Asia Cup participations ==
Year	Result in Division B
2018	7th
2022	4th
2024	3rd place, bronze medalist(s)
