= Vodafone Arena (Fiji) =

Sports venue in Suva, Fiji

Coordinates: 18°8′49″S 178°27′1″E

Vodafone Arena is an arena in Suva, Fiji. The arena was constructed for the 2003 South Pacific Games that was held in Suva. Today, it is primarily used for netball and was intended to host the 2007 Netball World Championships, before Fiji's hosting of the event was cancelled in the wake of the military coup of 5 December 2006. The arena holds 4,000 people. It was previously known as the FMF Dome.
