= Philippines women's national under-16 basketball team =

U-16 women's Basketball team of Philippines

Philippines
- FIBA ranking: 43 ▲6 (2 December 2024)
- Joined FIBA: 1936
- FIBA zone: FIBA Asia
- National federation: Samahang Basketbol ng Pilipinas
- Coach: (Philippines) Julie Amos
- Nickname: Gilas Pilipinas

U17 World Cup
- Appearances: None

U16 Asia Cup
- Appearances: 2
- Medals: None

U16 Asia Cup Division B
- Appearances: 2
- Medals: (gold) Gold: 1 (2023); (bronze) Bronze: 1 (2022)
Home	Away

First international
- Philippines 64–91 India (Pune, India; November 30, 2009)

Biggest win
- Philippines 144–22 Maldives (Amman, Jordan; July 11, 2023)

Biggest defeat
- Philippines 29–144 China (Jinan, China; December 5, 2011)

The Philippines women's national under-16 basketball team is a national basketball team of the Philippines, administered by the Samahang Basketbol ng Pilipinas. It represents the country in international under-16 women's basketball competitions.

== FIBA U16 Women's Asia Cup record ==
Year	Division A				Division B			
Year	Position	Pld	W	L	Position	Pld	W	L
(India) 2009	7th	8	2	6	No Division B			
(China) 2011	6th	6	0	6	No Division B			
(Sri Lanka) 2013	Did not participate							
(Indonesia) 2015	Did not participate							
(India) 2017	Did not participate							
(Jordan) 2022	Played in Division B				3rd place, bronze medalist(s)	5	4	1
(Jordan) 2023	Played in Division B				1st place, gold medalist(s)	5	5	0
(Malaysia) 2025	To be determined				Played in Division A			

== Current roster ==
Philippines roster at the 2025 FIBA U16 Women's Asia Cup:

Philippines Women's Under-16 National Basketball Team roster
Players
Coaches

Pos.	No.	Name	Age – Date of birth	Height	Club	Ctr.
PF	2	Maria Zuzzane Singson	15 – December 2, 2009	5 ft 8 in (1.73 m)	NU Nazareth	(Philippines)
SG	4	Makena Ramos	13 – October 8, 2011	5 ft 10 in (1.78 m)	Brentwood Middle School	(United States)
SF	5	Zaira Vinluan	16 – February 15, 2009	5 ft 8 in (1.73 m)	Rowville Secondary	(Australia)
G	8	Ryanna Roman	16 – February 19, 2009	5 ft 6 in (1.68 m)	Putnam Science Academy	(United States)
F	10	Ella Adorada Smith	15 – January 27, 2010	5 ft 8 in (1.73 m)	Democracy Prep	(United States)
PG	11	Zia Oñate	12 – January 24, 2013	5 ft 5 in (1.65 m)	NU Nazareth	(Philippines)
C	12	Ruiza Olmos	15 – November 12, 2009	5 ft 9 in (1.75 m)	National University (Philippines)	(Philippines)
G	15	Sofia Alessandra Martinez	15 – August 25, 2010	5 ft 3 in (1.6 m)	De La Salle Santiago Zobel School	(Philippines)
C	20	Alyza Gozon	15 – May 20, 2010	5 ft 8 in (1.73 m)	Calinog National Comprehensive High School	(Philippines)
F	21	Olivia Addison Molina	16 – August 6, 2009	5 ft 8 in (1.73 m)	St. Joseph High School	(United States)
F	22	Brianna Katigbak	15 – November 25, 2009	5 ft 8 in (1.73 m)	NU Nazareth	(Philippines)
SG	24	Tiffany Reyes	14 – September 24, 2010	6 ft 1 in (1.85 m)	Sycamore High School	(United States)

Head coach

- (Philippines) Julie Amos

Assistant coaches

- (Philippines) Patrick Aquino

Legend

- (C) Team captain
- from field describes last
  club before the tournament

== Latest scores ==
=== 2025 FIBA U16 Women's Asia Cup (Division A) ===
Group A

24 September 2025
14:00

Boxscore

South Korea	75–77	Philippines
Scoring by quarter: 15–17, 23–20, 19–19, 18–21
Pts: Lim 31; Rebs: Kim D.H. 12; Asts: Yoo 5		Pts: Smith 21; Rebs: Ramos 8 Asts: Smith 4

Arena Seremban, Seremban
Attendance: 100
Referees: Yana Nikogossyan (KAZ), Elie Rahji (SYR), Wang Wansong (CHN)

23 September 2025
14:00

Boxscore

Philippines	48–74	Chinese Taipei
Scoring by quarter: 12–22, 12–20, 12–18, 12–14
Pts: Smith 14; Rebs: Smith 10; Asts: Smith 4		Pts: Chang Y.T. 17; Rebs: Feng 10; Asts: Gao 6

Arena Seremban, Seremban
Attendance: 100
Referees: Nattapong Jontapa (THA), Elie Rahji (SYR)

22 September 2025
11:30

Boxscore

Australia	123–42	Philippines
Scoring by quarter: 33–12, 29–10, 32–10, 29–10
Pts: Fakalata 19; Rebs: Manyok 16; Asts: Hocking 9		Pts: Ramos 16; Rebs: Vinluan 6 Asts: four players 1

Arena Seremban, Seremban
Attendance: 100
Referees: Hu Jing (CHN), Samuel Pan (NZL), Wang Wansong (CHN)

== Past Scores ==
=== 2023 FIBA U16 Women's Asian Championship (Division B) ===
Final

16 July 2023
19:30

Boxscore

Philippines	83–60	Iran
Scoring by quarter: 19–15, 22–11, 18–19, 24–15
Pts: Smith 21; Rebs: Palma 11; Asts: Fajardo 9		Pts: Houdneh, Jafari 14; Rebs: Houdneh 16; Asts: Bazoobandi 7

Prince Hamzah Stadium, Amman
Referees: Shigeyuki Arisawa (JPN), Kim Ga-in (KOR), Anan Daraghma (PLE)

Semifinals

15 July 2023
17:30

Boxscore

Philippines	79–44	Malaysia
Scoring by quarter: 15–13, 30–14, 21–8, 13–9
Pts: Fajardo 20; Rebs: De La O, Palma 11; Asts: Arnaldo 6		Pts: Wong 16; Rebs: Yap 9 Asts: Ang 4

Prince Hamzah Stadium, Amman
Referees: Via Diah Rohmana (INA), Mohanad Jawad Fanharawi (IRQ), Hu Jing (CHN)

Group A

12 July 2023
19:30

Boxscore

Jordan	58–106	Philippines
Scoring by quarter: 19–26, 14–30, 16–23, 9–27
Pts: Z. Alkarain 26; Rebs: Z. Alkarain 7 Asts: H. Alkarain 2		Pts: Sayson 19; Rebs: Canindo, Palma 8 Asts: Nair 7

Prince Hamzah Stadium, Amman
Referees: Hu Jing (CHN), Wissam Zein (SYR), Sasha Nicholson (NZL)

11 July 2023
15:30

Boxscore

Philippines	144–22	Maldives
Scoring by quarter: 41–5, 29–6, 31–4, 43–7
Pts: Canindo 21; Rebs: De La O 12; Asts: Arnaldo 7		Pts: Shirhan 11; Rebs: Nimal 9 Asts: Three players 1

Prince Hamzah Stadium, Amman
Referees: Madison Crowley-Long (AUS), Via Diah Rohmana (INA), Mohanad Jawad Fanharawi (IRQ)

10 July 2023
17:30

Boxscore

Philippines	79–40	Hong Kong
Scoring by quarter: 17–11, 20–9, 21–8, 21–12
Pts: Fajardo 17; Rebs: De La O 12; Asts: Arnaldo 6		Pts: Kam 14; Rebs: Mak 11; Asts: Mak 4

Prince Hamzah Stadium, Amman
Referees: Wissam Zein (SYR), Kim Ga-in (KOR), Taha Al-Hashedi (YEM)

=== 2023 FIBA U16 Women's Asian Championship (Division B) ===
Final

30 June 2022
15:45

Boxscore

Philippines	90–68	Lebanon
Scoring by quarter: 20–22, 24–15, 23–11, 23–20
Pts: Ramos, Yumul 20; Rebs: Panganiban 9 Asts: Yumul 6		Pts: Bado 19; Rebs: Labban 8 Asts: Naassan 5

Prince Hamzah Stadium, Amman
Referees: Elham Khazneh (JOR), Mohanad Jawad Fanharawi (IRQ), Sasha Nicholson (NZL)

Semifinals

29 June 2022
15:45

Boxscore

Philippines	73–88	Samoa
Scoring by quarter: 18–25, 12–28, 23–19, 20–16
Pts: Panganiban 15; Rebs: Ramos 8 Asts: three players 3		Pts: Filemu 36; Rebs: Oloapu 19; Asts: Tutani 10

Prince Hamzah Stadium, Amman
Referees: Anan Daraghma (PLE), Samaneh Dehghani (IRN), Ahmad Suleiman AlYousef (JOR)

Group A

26 June 2022
15:45

Boxscore

Samoa	65–94	Philippines
Scoring by quarter: 19–26, 15–23, 18–22, 13–23
Pts: Filemu 28; Rebs: Filemu 27; Asts: Filemu 7		Pts: Yumul 22; Rebs: Ramos 10; Asts: Yumul, Panganiban 5

Prince Hamzah Stadium, Amman
Referees: Mohammad Fawzi Taha (JOR), Kim Ga-in (KOR), Richard El Hajj (LBN)

25 June 2022
15:45

Boxscore

Philippines	92–86	Syria
Scoring by quarter: 26–19, 21–12, 26–32, 19–23
Pts: Yumul 33; Rebs: Ramos 14; Asts: Panganiban 8		Pts: Backour 28; Rebs: Backour 13; Asts: Almohammad 8

Prince Hamzah Stadium, Amman
Referees: Alexey Stepanenko (KAZ), Sergio Kassab (LBN), Elham Khazneh (JOR)

24 June 2022
15:45

Boxscore

Indonesia	68–104	Philippines
Scoring by quarter: 21–17, 18–28, 15–27, 14–32
Pts: Candra 16; Rebs: Candra 13; Asts: Khayra, Sutisna 3		Pts: Ramos 27; Rebs: Ramos 20; Asts: Panganiban 5

Prince Hamzah Stadium, Amman
Referees: Mohammad Fawzi Taha (JOR), Haylee Cole (AUS), Sasha Nicholson (NZL)

== Past rosters ==
=== 2009 ===
2009 FIBA Asia Under-16 Championship for Women: finished 7th among 12 teams

Likhang Hinirang Javier, Trisha Angela Dy, Tara Shane Araneta, Elrica Aniela Castro, Jacqueline Tanaman, Lore Rivera, Trisha Anne Piatos, Regina Marie Pioquinto, Maria Rosario Franchesca Tantoco, Danica Therese Jose, Alyanna Francesca Nitorreda, Jonah Marie Melendres

=== 2022 ===
Philippines roster at the 2022 FIBA U16 Women's Asian Championship:

Philippines Women's Under-16 National Basketball Team roster
Players
Coaches

Pos.	No.	Name	Age – Date of birth	Height	Club	Ctr.
G	2	Naomi Natalie Panganiban	16 – June 5, 2006	5 ft 4 in (1.63 m)	Fil-Am Nation	(Philippines)
G	3	Ava Camryn Fajardo	14 – October 3, 2007	5 ft 4 in (1.63 m)	New Jersey Rise National Team	(Philippines)
F	4	Gabriella Ramos	15 – April 5, 2007	6 ft 0 in (1.83 m)	Fil-Am Nation	(Philippines)
G	5	Hannah Lopez	15 – December 27, 2006	5 ft 8 in (1.73 m)	Fil-Am Nation	(Philippines)
F	7	Princess BJ Marie Villarin	16 – August 2, 2005	5 ft 6 in (1.68 m)	National University (Philippines)	(Philippines)
C	8	Samantha Paulene Medina	15 – October 11, 2006	6 ft 1 in (1.85 m)	Fil-Am Nation	(Philippines)
G	12	Dianne Camille Nolasco	17 – February 26, 2005	5 ft 3 in (1.6 m)	Miriam College	(Philippines)
F	13	Emaleena Elson	16 – February 24, 2006	5 ft 11 in (1.8 m)	Fil-Am Nation	(Philippines)
G	20	Kristan Geyl Yumul	17 – June 24, 2005	5 ft 9 in (1.75 m)	Fil-Am Nation	(Philippines)
G	22	Sierra Jade Patricio	14 – July 4, 2007	5 ft 9 in (1.75 m)	Fil-Am Nation	(Philippines)
G	24	Kailah Jade Oani	16 – January 28, 2006	5 ft 8 in (1.73 m)	Fil-Am Nation	(Philippines)
G	31	Ryan Kelly Nair	15 – March 31, 2007	5 ft 7 in (1.7 m)	Fil-Am Nation	(Philippines)

Head coach

- (Philippines) Julie Amos

Assistant coaches

- (Philippines) Brian Rosario

Legend

- (C) Team captain
- from field describes last
  club before the tournament

== See also ==
- Philippines women's national basketball team
- Philippines women's national under-18 basketball team
- Philippines men's national under-17 basketball team
