= Lebanon women's national under-16 basketball team =

Lebanon
- FIBA ranking: 76 ▲ +10 (Dec 2024)
- Joined FIBA: 1947
- FIBA zone: FIBA Asia
- National federation: FLB

World Cup
- Appearances: None

Asia Championship
- Appearances: 1
Home	Away

The Lebanon women's national under-16 basketball team is the junior women's national basketball team, administered by Lebanese Basketball Federation, that represents Lebanon in international under-16 women's basketball competitions.

== History ==
The team participated in the 2022 FIBA Under-16 Women's Asian Championship, reaching the semi-finals and finishing fourth in the B division of the tournament.

== Tournament records ==
=== Asia Championship ===
FIBA Under-16 Women's Asia Cup						WABA Qualifier		
Year	Div	Pos	Pld	W	L	Pld	W	L
(India) 2009	did not participate							
(China) 2011	did not participate							
(Sri Lanka) 2013	did not participate							
(Indonesia) 2015	did not participate							
(India) 2017	did not participate							
(Jordan) 2022	B	4th	5	2	3			
(Jordan) 2023	B	did not participate						
(Malaysia) 2025	B	did not qualify				4	3	1
Total			5	2	3	4	3	1

== Latest Scores ==
=== 2022 FIBA U16 Women's Asian Championship ===
June 30, 2022

3rd Place Game Boxscore

Philippines	90–68	Lebanon
Scoring by quarter: 20–22, 24–15, 23–11, 23–20

Prince Hamzah Stadium, Amman

June 29, 2022

Semi Finals Boxscore

Lebanon	63–78	Syria
Scoring by quarter: 19–14, 8–19, 21–13, 15–32

Prince Hamzah Stadium, Amman

June 26, 2022

Group Phase Boxscore

Jordan	56–60	Lebanon
Scoring by quarter: 12–16, 14–10, 14–11, 16–23

Prince Hamzah Stadium, Amman

June 25, 2022

Group Phase Boxscore

Lebanon	50–51	Iran
Scoring by quarter: 12–17, 13–12, 9–14, 16–8

Prince Hamzah Stadium, Amman

June 24, 2022

Group Phase Boxscore

Kazakhstan	47–59	Lebanon
Scoring by quarter: 7–10, 10–15, 12–12, 18–22

Prince Hamzah Stadium, Amman

== Statistics ==
=== Asia Championship ===
Lebanon Statistical Leaders
Event	PPG	RPG	APG	SPG	BPG	EPG
(Jordan) 2022	E. Khoury (11.4)	N. Labban (6.0)	N. Labban (3.4)	E. Ghnatios (3.5)	M. Naassan (1.2)	E. Khoury (10.8)

== See also ==
- Sport in Lebanon
- Lebanon women's national basketball team
- Lebanon women's national under-18 basketball team
- Lebanon men's national basketball team
- Lebanon men's national under-19 basketball team
- Lebanon men's national under-17 basketball team
