= Julie Amos =

Filipino basketball coach (born 1972)

Philippines women's national under-16 team
- Position: Head coach

Personal information
- Born: August 2, 1972 (age 54)

Career information
- College: UST

Career history

Playing
- 1998–1999: Ever Bilena

Coaching
- 2022: Philippines U16 (women)
- 2024: Philippines U18 (women)
- 2025–: Philippines U16 (women)

Career highlights
- 2x WPBL champions (1998, 1999); 1x WPBL Most Valuable Player (1998)
Medals
Representing Philippines
Women's basketball
SEA Games
Silver medal – second place	2019 Chiang Mai	Team

Julie Amos (born August 2, 1972) is a Filipino basketball coach and former player. She has been head coach of the under-16 and under-18 women's national teams of the Philippines.

== Playing career ==
Amos played for the UST Growling Tigresses women's basketball team during her collegiate years.

Amos played for Ever Bilena at the Women's Philippine Basketball League. The team won the 1998 and 1999 season. She was named Most Valuable Player in 1998.

At the international level, Amos was part of the Philippine national team that won the silver medal at the women's tournament of the 1995 SEA Games. She also played in the 1991 and 1993 editions.

== Coaching career ==
=== Philippines women's U16 ===
Amos was appointed as head coach of the Philippines women's national U16 team for the 2022 FIBA U16 Women's Asian Championship. The team's promotion bid was ended when Samoa defeated the Philippines in the semifinals.

The Philippines earned a promotion under head coach Ai Lebornio in the 2023 FIBA U16 Women's Asian Championship. Amos became coach again for the Philippines' Division A debut at the 2025 FIBA U16 Women's Asia Cup

=== Philippines women's U18 ===
She also coached the Philippine U18 team. She qualified the team for the 2024 FIBA U18 Women's Asia Cup Division B via the SEABA qualifiers. The team won the tournament and got promoted to Division A of the 2026 FIBA U18 Women's Asia Cup.

=== Philippines women's ===
Amos is an assistant coach to Patrick Aquino for the Philippine women's senior national team. National team Ella Fajardo credits Amos for scouting her as an eight-year old via the Milo Best Center where Amos also serves as a coach.
