= Philippines national basketball team =

The Philippines national basketball team may refer to:

- Philippines men's national basketball team
- Philippines women's national basketball team
- Philippines men's national under-19 basketball team
- Philippines men's national under-17 basketball team
- Philippines women's national under-19 basketball team
- Philippines women's national under-17 basketball team
