= 2022 FIBA U16 Women's Asian Championship =

6th FIBA Under-16 Women's Asian Basketball Championship

Tournament details
- Host country: Jordan
- City: Amman
- Dates: 24–30 June
- Teams: 13 (from 1 confederation)
- Venue: 1 (in 1 host city)

Final positions
- Champions: Australia (2nd title)
- Runners-up: Japan
- Third place: South Korea

Tournament statistics
- Top scorer: (Samoa) Filemu (25.8)
- Top rebounds: (Iran) Ghesmati Almani (18.8)
- Top assists: (Japan) Kurokawa (8.2)
- PPG (Team): Philippines (90.6)
- RPG (Team): Iran (62.0)
- APG (Team): Australia (25.7)

Official website
- Division A at www.fiba.basketball/history Division B at www.fiba.basketball/history

The 2022 FIBA U16 Women's Asian Championship was an international under-16 girls' basketball tournament that was held from 24 to 30 June 2022 in Amman, Jordan.

The tournament was last held in 2017. The next edition was supposed to be held from 5 to 10 April 2020 in Canberra, Australia, but it was cancelled by FIBA due to the COVID-19 pandemic.

The sixth edition of the biennial competition, this was also the FIBA Asia's qualifying tournament for the 2022 FIBA U17 Women's Basketball World Cup in Hungary.

== Qualified teams ==
For Division A:

- Semifinalists of the 2017 FIBA U16 Women's Asian Championship:
  - Australia
  - Japan
  - China
  - New Zealand
- 5th-7th placers of the 2017 FIBA U16 Women's Asian Championship:
  - South Korea
  - Chinese Taipei
  - Thailand
- Division B winners at the 2017 FIBA U16 Women's Asian Championship:
  - India

For Division B:

- The host nation:
  - Jordan
- Division A 8th placers at the 2017 FIBA U16 Women's Asian Championship, being relegated to Division B:
  - Hong Kong
- 3rd-4th placers of the 2018 FIBA Under-15 Women's Oceania Championship:
  - Samoa
  - Fiji
- Teams from FIBA Asia on a first-come first-registered basis:
  - Indonesia
  - Iran
  - Kazakhstan
  - Lebanon
  - Philippines
  - Syria

== Divisions ==
Division A includes the semifinalists of the previous championship, along with the losing quarterfinalists ranking fifth to seventh places. The winner of Division B of the previous championship will also join Division A, as per tournament procedure.

However, teams from China, Chinese Taipei, and Thailand were reportedly withdrawing from the tournament, leaving the remaining five teams to compete in Division A, as seen from the official tournament website.

Division B includes the host team, third and fourth-place winners of the 2018 FIBA Under-15 Women's Oceania Championship and the Division A 8th Placer, along with the registered teams allotted for FIBA Asia.

Reportedly withdrawing are the supposed to be qualified teams from Fiji and Hong Kong. Therefore, the invitation was extended to other FIBA Asia teams in order to complete the eight participants for Division B.

Returning participants from the previous championship are Iran and Kazakhstan. Indonesia last participated when they hosted the 2015 edition while the Philippines were part of 2011 edition that was held in China. Completing the Division B are the first-time participants Lebanon, Samoa, and Syria.

Included were the FIBA World Rankings prior to the tournament. Rosters for both divisions were already confirmed on 23 June 2022.

Division A	Division B
Australia (2); Japan (7); South Korea (19); New Zealand (21); India (52)	Indonesia (41); Kazakhstan (53); Iran (72); Syria (75); Samoa (86); Jordan (NR); Lebanon (NR); Philippines (NR)

== Division A ==
All times are local (UTC+03:00)

=== Preliminary round ===
==== Group A ====
Pos	Team	Pld	W	L	PF	PA	PD	Pts	Qualification
1	Australia	4	4	0	350	235	+115	8	Semifinals
2	Japan	4	3	1	362	212	+150	7	Semifinals
3	New Zealand	4	2	2	280	272	+8	6	Semifinals
4	South Korea	4	1	3	294	298	−4	5	Semifinals
5	India	4	0	4	158	427	−269	4	Eliminated

Source: FIBA
Rules for classification: 1) Points; 2) Head-to-head results; 3) Points difference; 4) Points scored.

24 June 2022
09:00

Boxscore

Japan	128–39	India
Scoring by quarter: 35–4, 32–10, 29–9, 32–16
Pts: Ueno 19; Rebs: Fukatsu 10; Asts: Kurokawa 16		Pts: M. Kaur 21; Rebs: M. Kaur 8 Asts: Munishkannan 5

Prince Hamzah Stadium, Amman
Referees: Richard El Hajj (LBN), Samaneh Dehghani (IRN), Ahmad Suleiman AlYousef (JOR)

24 June 2022
11:15

Boxscore

New Zealand	80–63	South Korea
Scoring by quarter: 10–13, 22–22, 24–19, 24–9
Pts: Jones 15; Rebs: Taulelei 14; Asts: Jones 6		Pts: Yang 22; Rebs: Jeong 8 Asts: Sung 15

Prince Hamzah Stadium, Amman
Referees: Alexey Stepanenko (KAZ), Elham Khazneh (JOR), Mohanad Jawad Fanharawi (IRQ)

25 June 2022
09:00

Boxscore

Australia	77–57	New Zealand
Scoring by quarter: 18–20, 22–11, 17–9, 20–17
Pts: Juffermans 22; Rebs: Juffermans, Shiels 10; Asts: Shiels, Clark 5		Pts: Jones 12; Rebs: Cameron 6 Asts: Cameron 4

Prince Hamzah Stadium, Amman
Referees: Ahmad Suleiman AlYousef (JOR), Richard El Hajj (LBN), Via Diah Rohmana (INA)

25 June 2022
11:15

Boxscore

South Korea	51–82	Japan
Scoring by quarter: 19–20, 12–23, 12–22, 8–17
Pts: Kim Sol. 14; Rebs: Ko 8 Asts: Jeong 3		Pts: Ueno 14; Rebs: Fukatsu 10; Asts: Kurokawa 7

Prince Hamzah Stadium, Amman
Referees: Wissam Zein (SYR), Mahsa Kargari (IRN), John Lester Celeste (PHI)

26 June 2022
09:00

Boxscore

India	40–101	South Korea
Scoring by quarter: 10–19, 9–30, 9–33, 12–19
Pts: M. Kaur 15; Rebs: M. Kaur 15; Asts: Raja 6		Pts: Yang 24; Rebs: Kim C. 7 Asts: Heo 7

Prince Hamzah Stadium, Amman
Referees: Ahmad Suleiman AlYousef (JOR), Alia Alyassin (SYR), Via Diah Rohmana (INA)

26 June 2022
11:15

Boxscore

Japan	65–73	Australia
Scoring by quarter: 9–24, 13–17, 18–12, 25–20
Pts: Fukatsu 13; Rebs: Yamada, Fukatsu 9 Asts: Kurokawa 4		Pts: Juffermans 16; Rebs: Juffermans 11; Asts: Clark 8

Prince Hamzah Stadium, Amman
Referees: Alexey Stepanenko (KAZ), Elham Khazneh (JOR), Sergio Kassab (LBN)

27 June 2022
09:00

Boxscore

New Zealand	49–87	Japan
Scoring by quarter: 20–19, 9–16, 14–30, 6–22
Pts: Jones 15; Rebs: Cameron 6 Asts: Jones, Cameron 3		Pts: Higashi, Tanaka 16; Rebs: Fukatsu 13; Asts: Kurokawa 7

Prince Hamzah Stadium, Amman
Referees: Mohammad Fawzi Taha (JOR), Alexey Stepanenko (KAZ), Samaneh Dehghani (IRN)

27 June 2022
11:15

Boxscore

Australia	104–34	India
Scoring by quarter: 23–15, 27–5, 22–6, 32–8
Pts: Laditan 17; Rebs: Hanson 9 Asts: Bobongie 5		Pts: M. Kaur 8 Rebs: Adla, Dabas, M. Kaur 3 Asts: Raja, M. Kaur 4

Prince Hamzah Stadium, Amman
Referees: Elham Khazneh (JOR), Mahsa Kargari (IRN), Via Diah Rohmana (INA)

28 June 2022
09:00

Boxscore

South Korea	79–96	Australia
Scoring by quarter: 16–19, 18–28, 19–24, 26–25
Pts: Ko 19; Rebs: Ko 3 Asts: Heo, Sung 6		Pts: Shiels 20; Rebs: Juffermans 17; Asts: Shiels 8

Prince Hamzah Stadium, Amman
Referees: Wissam Zein (SYR), Mahsa Kargari (IRN), Sergio Kassab (LBN)

28 June 2022
11:15

Boxscore

India	45–94	New Zealand
Scoring by quarter: 9–17, 10–23, 13–27, 13–27
Pts: Raja 9 Rebs: M. Kaur 9 Asts: four players 2		Pts: Jones 15; Rebs: Taulelei 10; Asts: Williams 6

Prince Hamzah Stadium, Amman
Referees: Ahmad Suleiman AlYousef (JOR), Alia Alyassin (SYR), Samaneh Dehghani (IRN)

=== Knockout round ===
==== Bracket ====
Semifinals
29 June
Australia	98
South Korea	81
29 June
Japan	87
New Zealand	58

Final
30 June
Australia	59
Japan	58
Third place game
30 June
South Korea	78
New Zealand	59

==== Semifinals ====
29 June 2022
09:00

Boxscore

Australia	98–81	South Korea
Scoring by quarter: 25–19, 17–21, 28–28, 28–13
Pts: Juffermans 37; Rebs: Juffermans 15; Asts: Petrie 10		Pts: Kim Sol. 20; Rebs: three players 3 Asts: Sung 6

Prince Hamzah Stadium, Amman
Referees: Alexey Stepanenko (KAZ), Mohammad Fawzi Taha (JOR), Via Diah Rohmana (INA)

29 June 2022
11:15

Boxscore

Japan	87–58	New Zealand
Scoring by quarter: 24–15, 22–18, 24–10, 17–15
Pts: Ueno 14; Rebs: Fukatsu 14; Asts: Kurokawa 11		Pts: Brown 11; Rebs: Lacey-Rameka, Tamilo 5 Asts: three players 3

Prince Hamzah Stadium, Amman
Referees: Wissam Zein (SYR), Elham Khazneh (JOR), John Lester Celeste (PHI)

==== Third place game ====
30 June 2022
09:00

Boxscore

South Korea	78–59	New Zealand
Scoring by quarter: 22–20, 15–4, 20–14, 21–21
Pts: Kim Sol. 26; Rebs: Sung 14; Asts: Sung 9		Pts: Jones 18; Rebs: Tamilo 12; Asts: three players 3

Prince Hamzah Stadium, Amman
Referees: hmad Suleiman AlYousef (JOR), Samaneh Dehghani (IRN), Alan Jose (IND)

==== Final ====
30 June 2022
11:15

Boxscore

Australia	59–58	Japan
Scoring by quarter: 17–14, 12–12, 13–18, 17–14
Pts: Juffermans 14; Rebs: Juffermans 13; Asts: Petrie 6		Pts: Tanaka 17; Rebs: Fukatsu 7 Asts: Kurokawa 4

Prince Hamzah Stadium, Amman
Referees: Alexey Stepanenko (KAZ), Wissam Zein (SYR), Kim Ga-in (KOR)

== Division B ==
All times are local (UTC+03:00)

=== Preliminary round ===
==== Group A ====
Pos	Team	Pld	W	L	PF	PA	PD	Pts	Qualification
1	Philippines	3	3	0	290	219	+71	6	Semifinals
2	Syria	3	2	1	236	229	+7	5	Qualification to Semifinals
3	Samoa	3	1	2	185	217	−32	4	Qualification to Semifinals
4	Indonesia	3	0	3	190	236	−46	3	Seventh place game

Source: FIBA
Rules for classification: 1) Points; 2) Head-to-head results; 3) Points difference; 4) Points scored.

24 June 2022
13:30

Boxscore

Syria	75–63	Samoa
Scoring by quarter: 18–21, 18–16, 20–11, 19–15
Pts: Almohammad 19; Rebs: Almohammad 10; Asts: Hasan Agha 6		Pts: Filemu 24; Rebs: Filemu 15; Asts: Filemu, Manumaleuga 4

Prince Hamzah Stadium, Amman
Referees: Ibrahim Jerrar (JOR), Mahsa Kargari (IRN), Sergio Kassab (LBN)

24 June 2022
15:45

Boxscore

Indonesia	68–104	Philippines
Scoring by quarter: 21–17, 18–28, 15–27, 14–32
Pts: Candra 16; Rebs: Candra 13; Asts: Khayra, Sutisna 3		Pts: Ramos 27; Rebs: Ramos 20; Asts: Panganiban 5

Prince Hamzah Stadium, Amman
Referees: Mohammad Fawzi Taha (JOR), Haylee Cole (AUS), Sasha Nicholson (NZL)

25 June 2022
13:30

Boxscore

Samoa	57–48	Indonesia
Scoring by quarter: 16–12, 12–7, 17–10, 12–19
Pts: Filemu 24; Rebs: Filemu 14; Asts: Tutani 5		Pts: Madafa 13; Rebs: Candra 16; Asts: Madafa, Khayra 5

Prince Hamzah Stadium, Amman
Referees: Ibrahim Jerrar (JOR), Samaneh Dehghani (IRN), Ahmad Suleiman AlYousef (JOR)

25 June 2022
15:45

Boxscore

Philippines	92–86	Syria
Scoring by quarter: 26–19, 21–12, 26–32, 19–23
Pts: Yumul 33; Rebs: Ramos 14; Asts: Panganiban 8		Pts: Backour 28; Rebs: Backour 13; Asts: Almohammad 8

Prince Hamzah Stadium, Amman
Referees: Alexey Stepanenko (KAZ), Sergio Kassab (LBN), Elham Khazneh (JOR)

26 June 2022
13:30

Boxscore

Indonesia	74–75	Syria
Scoring by quarter: 24–13, 14–24, 19–16, 17–22
Pts: Siregar 20; Rebs: Candra 15; Asts: Gosal 6		Pts: Alahmar 23; Rebs: Alahmar 12; Asts: Almohammad 7

Prince Hamzah Stadium, Amman
Referees: Ibrahim Jerrar (JOR), Samaneh Dehghani (IRN), Mahsa Kargari (IRN)

26 June 2022
15:45

Boxscore

Samoa	65–94	Philippines
Scoring by quarter: 19–26, 15–23, 18–22, 13–23
Pts: Filemu 28; Rebs: Filemu 27; Asts: Filemu 7		Pts: Yumul 22; Rebs: Ramos 10; Asts: Yumul, Panganiban 5

Prince Hamzah Stadium, Amman
Referees: Mohammad Fawzi Taha (JOR), Kim Ga-in (KOR), Richard El Hajj (LBN)

==== Group B ====
Pos	Team	Pld	W	L	PF	PA	PD	Pts	Qualification
1	Lebanon	3	2	1	169	154	+15	5 (Note: 1−1, 1.112 (beaten Kazakhstan, lost to Iran))	Semifinals
2	Kazakhstan	3	2	1	180	161	+19	5 (Note: 1−1, 0.981 (beaten Iran, lost to Lebanon))	Qualification to Semifinals
3	Iran	3	2	1	165	147	+18	5 (Note: 1−1, 0.915 (beaten Lebanon, lost to Kazakhstan))	Qualification to Semifinals
4	Jordan (H)	3	0	3	153	205	−52	3	Seventh place game

Source: FIBA
Rules for classification: 1) Points; 2) Head-to-head results; 3) Points difference; 4) Points scored.
(H) Hosts
Notes:

24 June 2022
18:00

Boxscore

Iran	68–41	Jordan
Scoring by quarter: 14–20, 20–9, 12–5, 22–7
Pts: Khodamoradi 14; Rebs: Ghesmati Almani 23; Asts: Zarreh 8		Pts: Sahlieh 12; Rebs: Jumah 9 Asts: Khoury 3

Prince Hamzah Stadium, Amman
Referees: Anan Daraghma (PLE), Alia Alyassin (SYR), Alan Jose (IND)

24 June 2022
20:15

Boxscore

Kazakhstan	47–59	Lebanon
Scoring by quarter: 7–10, 10–15, 12–12, 18–22
Pts: Knaub 12; Rebs: Knaub 11; Asts: Kolupayeva 5		Pts: Annan 16; Rebs: Rizk 11; Asts: Khoury 6

Prince Hamzah Stadium, Amman
Referees: Wissam Zein (SYR), Kim Bo-hui (KOR), John Lester Celeste (PHI)

25 June 2022
18:00

Boxscore

Jordan	56–77	Kazakhstan
Scoring by quarter: 13–20, 12–24, 22–13, 9–20
Pts: Sahlieh 16; Rebs: Jumah 15; Asts: Khoury 4		Pts: Knaub 24; Rebs: Knaub 27; Asts: Kolupayeva 6

Prince Hamzah Stadium, Amman
Referees: Haylee Cole (AUS), Kim Gain (KOR), Mohanad Jawad Fanharawi (IRQ)

25 June 2022
20:15

Boxscore

Lebanon	50–51	Iran
Scoring by quarter: 12–17, 13–12, 9–14, 16–8
Pts: Labban 13; Rebs: Khoury 9 Asts: Labban 5		Pts: Nouri 15; Rebs: Khodamoradi 9 Asts: Khodamoradi 6

Prince Hamzah Stadium, Amman
Referees: Anan Daraghma (PLE), Sasha Nicholson (NZL), Alan Jose (IND)

26 June 2022
18:00

Boxscore

Jordan	56–60	Lebanon
Scoring by quarter: 12–16, 14–10, 14–11, 16–23
Pts: Sahlieh 15; Rebs: Jumah 17; Asts: Jumah 3		Pts: Khoury 16; Rebs: Naassan 7 Asts: three players 4

Prince Hamzah Stadium, Amman
Referees: Wissam Zein (SYR), Sasha Nicholson (NZL), Mohanad Jawad Fanharawi (IRQ)

26 June 2022
20:15

Boxscore

Kazakhstan	56–46	Iran
Scoring by quarter: 17–11, 12–13, 10–15, 17–7
Pts: Kochura 16; Rebs: Knaub 16; Asts: Kolupayeva 5		Pts: Khodamoradi 12; Rebs: Ghesmati Almani 13; Asts: Khodamoradi 5

Prince Hamzah Stadium, Amman
Referees: Anan Daraghma (PLE), Alan Jose (IND), John Lester Celeste (PHI)

=== Knockout round ===
==== Bracket ====
Qualification to Semifinals
28 June
Kazakhstan	51
Samoa	54
28 June
Syria	59
Iran	46

Semifinals
29 June
Philippines	73
Samoa	88
29 June
Lebanon	63
Syria	78

Final
30 June
Samoa	79
Syria	76
Third place game
30 June
Philippines	90
Lebanon	68

==== Qualification to Semifinals ====
28 June 2022
15:45

Boxscore

Syria	59–46	Iran
Scoring by quarter: 15–12, 13–12, 12–15, 19–7
Pts: Hasan Agha 14; Rebs: Doubal, Jamsakian 11; Asts: Almohammad 6		Pts: Khodamoradi 11; Rebs: Ghesmati Almani 24; Asts: Jafarzadeh 5

Prince Hamzah Stadium, Amman
Referees: Alexey Stepanenko (KAZ), Haylee Cole (AUS), Kim Gain (KOR)

28 June 2022
20:15

Boxscore

Kazakhstan	51–54	Samoa
Scoring by quarter: 14–11, 4–18, 14–10, 19–15
Pts: Khamitova 15; Rebs: Knaub 15; Asts: Kochura 7		Pts: Filemu 20; Rebs: Filemu 21; Asts: Manumaleuga 5

Prince Hamzah Stadium, Amman
Referees: Mohammad Fawzi Taha (JOR), Via Diah Rohmana (INA), Mohanad Jawad Fanharawi (IRQ)

==== Semifinals ====
29 June 2022
15:45

Boxscore

Philippines	73–88	Samoa
Scoring by quarter: 18–25, 12–28, 23–19, 20–16
Pts: Panganiban 15; Rebs: Ramos 8 Asts: three players 3		Pts: Filemu 36; Rebs: Oloapu 19; Asts: Tutani 10

Prince Hamzah Stadium, Amman
Referees: Anan Daraghma (PLE), Samaneh Dehghani (IRN), Ahmad Suleiman AlYousef (JOR)

29 June 2022
18:00

Boxscore

Lebanon	63–78	Syria
Scoring by quarter: 19–14, 8–19, 21–13, 15–32
Pts: Labban, Naassan 14; Rebs: Naassan 8 Asts: four players 3		Pts: Hasan Agha 28; Rebs: Jamsakian 10; Asts: Jamsakian 6

Prince Hamzah Stadium, Amman
Referees: Haylee Cole (AUS), Alan Jose (IND), Kim Ga-in (KOR)

==== Seventh place game ====
28 June 2022
18:00

Boxscore

Indonesia	70–34	Jordan
Scoring by quarter: 25–9, 12–10, 14–6, 19–9
Pts: Madafa 13; Rebs: Candra 8 Asts: Gosal 7		Pts: Abu Shameh 13; Rebs: Jumah 18; Asts: Al-Habahbeh 6

Prince Hamzah Stadium, Amman
Referees: Anan Daraghma (PLE), Alan Jose (IND), John Lester Celeste (PHI)

==== Fifth place game ====
29 June 2022
13:30

Boxscore

Iran	57–36	Kazakhstan
Scoring by quarter: 16–8, 12–9, 14–9, 15–10
Pts: Nouri 13; Rebs: Ghesmati Almani 26; Asts: Jafarzadeh 8		Pts: Knaub 12; Rebs: Yuldasheva 8 Asts: Kochura 6

Prince Hamzah Stadium, Amman
Referees: Sasha Nicholson (NZL), Sergio Kassab (LBN), Alia Alyassin (SYR)

==== Third place game ====
30 June 2022
15:45

Boxscore

Philippines	90–68	Lebanon
Scoring by quarter: 20–22, 24–15, 23–11, 23–20
Pts: Ramos, Yumul 20; Rebs: Panganiban 9 Asts: Yumul 6		Pts: Bado 19; Rebs: Labban 8 Asts: Naassan 5

Prince Hamzah Stadium, Amman
Referees: Elham Khazneh (JOR), Mohanad Jawad Fanharawi (IRQ), Sasha Nicholson (NZL)

==== Final ====
30 June 2022
18:00

Boxscore

Samoa	79–76	Syria
Scoring by quarter: 28–15, 15–24, 16–22, 20–15
Pts: Filemu 23; Rebs: Oloapu 19; Asts: Filemu 9		Pts: Khreim 17; Rebs: Khreim 8 Asts: Khreim 6

Prince Hamzah Stadium, Amman
Referees: Anan Daraghma (PLE), Haylee Cole (AUS), Mahsa Kargari (IRN)

== Final standings ==
Qualified for the 2022 FIBA Under-17 Women's Basketball World Cup

Rank	Team	Record
1st place, gold medalist(s)	Australia	6–0
2nd place, silver medalist(s)	Japan	4–2
3rd place, bronze medalist(s)	South Korea	2–4
4	New Zealand	2–4
5	India	0–4

Promoted to Division A of the 2023 FIBA U16 Women's Asian Championship

Rank	Team	Record
1st place, gold medalist(s)	Samoa	4–2
2nd place, silver medalist(s)	Syria	4–2
3rd place, bronze medalist(s)	Philippines	4–1
4	Lebanon	2–3
5	Iran	3–2
6	Kazakhstan	2–3
7	Indonesia	1–3
8	Jordan	0–4
