= Manmeet =

Manmeet is a given name. Notable people with the name include:

- Manmeet Bhullar (1980–2015), Canadian politician and member of the Legislative Assembly of Alberta
- Manmeet Kaur (fl. 2018), Pakistani journalist and social worker
- Manmeet Kaur (basketball) (born 2005), Indian basketball player
