= Uzbekistan women's national under-16 basketball team =

Uzbekistan
- FIBA zone: FIBA Asia
- National federation: Basketball Federation of Uzbekistan

U17 World Cup
- Appearances: None

U16 Asia Cup
- Appearances: 2
- Medals: None

U16 Asia Cup Division B
- Appearances: 1
- Medals: None

The Uzbekistan women's national under-16 basketball team is a national basketball team of Uzbekistan, administered by the Basketball Federation of Uzbekistan. It represents the country in international under-16 women's basketball competitions.

== FIBA U16 Asia Cup participations ==
| Year | Division A | Division B |
|---|---|---|
| 2011 | 11th | —N/a |
| 2015 | 12th | —N/a |
| 2025 | —N/a | 5th |

== See also ==
- Uzbekistan women's national basketball team
- Uzbekistan women's national under-18 basketball team
- Uzbekistan men's national under-16 basketball team
