= Lebanese Basketball Federation =

Fédération Libanaise de Basketball
- Abbreviation: FLB
- Formation: 1947; 79 years ago
- Headquarters: White House Hotel
- Location: Beirut, Lebanon
- Affiliations: FIBA; FIBA Asia; Lebanese Olympic Committee
- Website: https://lebanon.basketball/

The Lebanese Basketball Federation, known in French as the Fédération Libanaise de Basketball (FLB or FLBB), is the governing body of basketball in Lebanon.

The federation founded in 1947, represents basketball with public authorities as well as with national and international sports organizations and as such with Lebanon in international competitions. It is affiliated with FIBA Asia. The federation also organizes the Lebanon national basketball team and the Lebanon women's national basketball team.

== Leagues ==
The FLB organizes these tournaments:

- Lebanese Basketball League

== National team ==
The FLB manages these national teams:

- Men's (Senior, U-19, U-17)
- Women's (Senior, U-19, U-17)
