= Naomi Panganiban =

Filipino-American basketball player (born 2006)

No. 24 – San Diego State Aztecs
- Position: Point guard
- League: Mountain West Conference

Personal information
- Born: June 5, 2006 (age 20) San Diego, California, U.S.
- Listed height: 5 ft 7 in (1.70 m)

Career information
- High school: La Jolla Country Day (La Jolla, California)
- College: San Diego State (2024-present)

Naomi Natalie Panganiban (born June 5, 2006) is a Filipino-American college basketball player for the San Diego State Aztecs and the Philippines women's national basketball team.

== Early life ==
Panganiban was born on June 5, 2006, to Nestle and Jonathan Panganiban, both of whom are ethnic Filipinos who were born and raised in the United States.

She took up basketball taking inspiration from her older sister and father who also played the sport.

She attended the La Jolla Country Day School suiting up for the high school's women's basketball team occasionally receiving advice from La Jolla alumna Kelsey Plum.

Panganiban attends the San Diego State University and is pursuing a degree in business.

== College career ==
Panganiban joined the San Diego State Aztecs in 2024.

== National team career ==
Panganiban was brought in to the Philippines as part of the United States-based Fil-Am Nation Select team in 2022. She featured for the Philippines women's national under-17 team at the 2022 FIBA Under-16 Women's Asian Championship.

She helped the Philippine youth team earn a promotion to Division A from B at the 2024 FIBA U18 Women's Asia Cup.

Panganiban made her debut for the Philippine senior's women's team which played in the 2024 William Jones Cup in Taiwan. Her debut at a FIBA-sanctioned tournament was in August 2024 at the 2026 FIBA Women's Basketball World Cup Pre-Qualifying Tournament in Rwanda.
