= Uzbekistan women's national under-18 basketball team =

Uzbekistan
- FIBA zone: FIBA Asia
- National federation: Basketball Federation of Uzbekistan

U19 World Cup
- Appearances: None

U18 Asia Cup
- Appearances: 2 (1998, 2000)
- Medals: None

The Uzbekistan women's national under-18 basketball team is a national basketball team of Uzbekistan, administered by the Basketball Federation of Uzbekistan. It represents the country in international under-18 women's basketball competitions.

== FIBA Under-18 Women's Asia Cup participations ==
Year	Result in Division A
1998	6th
2000	8th

== See also ==
- Uzbekistan women's national basketball team
- Uzbekistan women's national under-16 basketball team
