= Theresna Ninon Salemon =

Indonesian basketball player (born 2007)

Ninon Salemon
Personal information
- Born: Bogor, Indonesia
- Listed height: 173 cm (5 ft 8 in)

Career information
- College: Fresno CC (2002-2004); Weber State (2004-2006)
- Playing career: 2004–2004
- Position: Point guard

Career history
- 2004: Mahaputri BritAma

Theresna Ninon Salemon is an Indonesian former professional basketball player. She last played for Mahaputri BritAma in the 2004 BritAma Women Basketball Invitational. She played college basketball for Fresno City College and the Weber State Wildcats. She is the first Indonesian to play in NCAA Division I.

== College statistics ==
Year/Seasons	GP	RPG	APG	SPG	BPG	PPG
04-05	13	0.4	0.2	0.0	0.0	1.1
05-06	13	0.5	0.3	0.1	0.0	0.5
