= FIBA U16 Women's Asia Cup =

Women's under-16 basketball championship

- Most recent season or competition: 2025 FIBA U16 Women's Asia Cup
- Formerly: FIBA Asia Under-16 Championship for Women, FIBA U16 Women's Asian Championship
- Sport: Basketball
- Founded: 2009; 17 years ago
- First season: 2009
- Organizing body: FIBA Asia
- No. of teams: 16
- Countries: FIBA Asia and FIBA Oceania member nations
- Continent: Asia
- Most recent champion: Australia (4th title)
- Most titles: Australia (4 titles)
- Qualification: FIBA Under-17 Women's Basketball World Cup
- Related competitions: FIBA U18 Women's Asia Cup
- Website: www.fiba.basketball/history (Division A) www.fiba.basketball/history (Division B)

The FIBA U16 Women's Asia Cup is an international under-16 basketball championship in the International Basketball Federation's FIBA Asia zone. The tournament started in 2009, and is held biennially. The top four teams qualify toward the FIBA Under-17 Women's Basketball World Cup.

Because of the recent change in the FIBA Calendar and the inclusion of Australia and New Zealand in all Asian tournaments, a new competition format was introduced at the start of the 2017 edition. Aside from renaming the tournament to FIBA U16 Women's Asian Championship, it is now composed of two divisions (namely Divisions A and B) with a maximum of eight teams each to participate.

Division A teams now contest for the four slots allocated for the FIBA Under-17 Women's Basketball World Cup, meaning the semifinalists are assured of a seat in the U17 Worlds. Meanwhile, the team that places eighth and last in the division is relegated to Division B in the next tournament. The remaining top seven or eight teams are retained up to the next tournament as well.

Division B teams use the same format as that of Division A, but unlike the previous setup wherein there were qualifying matches for the top two teams of the division, only the Division Champions are promoted to Division A in the next tournament.

== Summary ==
=== Division A ===
Year	Host	Final			Third place game		
Year	Host	Gold	Score	Silver	Bronze	Score	Fourth place
2009; Details	(India); Pune	China	99–86	Japan	Chinese Taipei	66–63	South Korea
2011; Details	(China); Jinan	Japan	102–56	South Korea	China	105–69	Chinese Taipei
2013; Details	(Sri Lanka); Colombo	China	62–50	Japan	South Korea	86–64	Chinese Taipei
2015; Details	(Indonesia); Medan	China	92–75	Japan	South Korea	60–52	Chinese Taipei
2017; Details	(India); Bangalore	Australia	61–60	Japan	China	60–43	New Zealand
2019; Details	(Australia); Canberra	Cancelled due to the COVID-19 pandemic					
2022; Details	(Jordan); Amman	Australia	59–58	Japan	South Korea	78–59	New Zealand
2023; Details	(Jordan); Amman	Australia	80–74	Japan	New Zealand	66–63	Chinese Taipei
2025; Details	(Malaysia); Seremban	Australia	86–50	New Zealand	Japan	71–58	China
2027	Indonesia		–			–	

=== Division B ===
Year	Host	Final			Third place game		
Year	Host	Gold	Score	Silver	Bronze	Score	Fourth place
2017; Details	(India); Bangalore	India	64–48	Malaysia	Kazakhstan	61–47	Iran
2019; Details	(Australia); Canberra	Cancelled due to the COVID-19 pandemic					
2022; Details	(Jordan); Amman	Samoa	79–76	Syria	Philippines	90–68	Lebanon
2023; Details	(Jordan); Amman	Philippines	83–60	Iran	Malaysia	52–46	Hong Kong
2025; Details	(Malaysia); Seremban	India	67–46	Iran	Indonesia	51–30	Hong Kong
2027	Indonesia		–			–	

== Medal table ==
- Division B medals are not included in this table.

Rank	Nation	Gold	Silver	Bronze	Total
1	Australia	4	0	0	4
2	China	3	0	2	5
3	Japan	1	6	1	8
4	South Korea	0	1	3	4
5	New Zealand	0	1	1	2
6	Chinese Taipei	0	0	1	1
Totals (6 entries)		8	8	8	24

== Participation details ==
=== Tournaments 2009–2015 ===
Team	(India) 2009	(China) 2011	(Sri Lanka) 2013	(Indonesia) 2015	Total
China	1st	3rd	1st	1st	4
Chinese Taipei	3rd	4th	4th	4th	4
Hong Kong	9th	8th	9th	7th	4
India	6th	5th	5th	6th	4
Indonesia			10th	8th	2
Japan	2nd	1st	2nd	2nd	4
Jordan			11th		1
Kazakhstan	10th		8th	11th	3
Macau		12th			1
Malaysia	8th	7th	6th	10th	4
Philippines	7th	6th			2
Singapore	11th	9th		9th	3
South Korea	4th	2nd	3rd	3rd	4
Sri Lanka	12th	10th	12th		3
Thailand	5th		7th	5th	3
Uzbekistan		11th		12th	2
Total	12	12	12	12	

- Starting in 2017, a new tournament format was introduced; two divisions were created: Division A and Division B.

=== Division A ===
Team	(India) 2017	(Jordan) 2022	(Jordan) 2023	(Malaysia) 2025	(Indonesia) 2027	Total
Australia	1st	1st	1st	1st		4
China	3rd		6th	4th		3
Chinese Taipei	6th		4th	5th		3
Hong Kong	8th					1
India		5th				1
Japan	2nd	2nd	2nd	3rd		4
New Zealand	4th	4th	3rd	2nd		4
Philippines				6th		1
Samoa			7th			1
South Korea	5th	3rd	5th	7th		4
Syria			8th	8th		2
Thailand	7th		9th			2
Total	8	5	9	8	8	

=== Division B ===
Team	(India) 2017	(Jordan) 2022	(Jordan) 2023	(Malaysia) 2025	(Indonesia) 2027	Total
Guam			7th			1
Hong Kong			4th	4th		2
India	1st			1st		2
Indonesia		7th		3rd		2
Iran	4th	5th	2nd	2nd		4
Jordan		8th	5th			2
Kazakhstan	3rd	6th				2
Lebanon		4th				1
Malaysia	2nd		3rd	6th		3
Maldives	7th		8th			2
Nepal	6th					1
Philippines		3rd	1st			2
Samoa		1st		8th		2
Singapore			6th			1
Sri Lanka	5th					1
Syria		2nd				1
Tonga				7th		1
Uzbekistan				5th		1
Total	7	8	8	8	8	

== U17 Women's World Cup record ==
Team	(France) 2010	(Netherlands) 2012	(Czech Republic) 2014	(Spain) 2016	(Belarus) 2018	(Hungary) 2022	(Mexico) 2024	(Czech Republic) 2026	(Indonesia) 2028	Total
Australia	As part of FIBA Oceania				3rd	5th	5th	3rd		4
China	3rd	–	11th	4th	11th	–	–	6th		5
Chinese Taipei	–	–	–	–	–	–	10th	–		1
Indonesia	–	–	–	–	–	–	–	–	Q	1
Japan	5th	4th	7th	9th	7th	8th	6th	7th		8
New Zealand	As part of FIBA Oceania				12th	12th	12th	5th		4
South Korea	–	9th	10th	15th	–	14th	–	–		4
Total	2	2	3	3	4	4	4	4	5	

== See also ==
- FIBA Women's Asia Cup
- FIBA U18 Women's Asia Cup
- FIBA U17 Women's World Cup
- FIBA U16 Asia Cup
