= Iran women's national under-16 basketball team =

Iran
- FIBA ranking: 65 ▲1 (December 2024)
- Joined FIBA: 2000
- FIBA zone: FIBA Asia
- National federation: Islamic Republic of Iran Basketball Federation

U17 World Cup
- Appearances: None

U16 Asia Cup
- Appearances: None

U16 Asia Cup Division B
- Appearances: 4
- Medals: (silver) Silver: 2 (2025, 2025)

First international
- Nepal 32–89 Iran; 2017 FIBA Under-16 Women's Asian Championship (Bangalore, India; 23 October 2017)

The Iran women's national under-16 basketball team is a national basketball team of Iran, administered by the Islamic Republic of Iran Basketball Federation. It represents the country in international under-16 women's basketball competitions.

The team participated for the first time during the 2017 FIBA Under-16 Women's Asian Championship in India, wherein they finished fourth in Division B.

== FIBA U16 Asia Cup record ==
- IRI 129-39 MDV (+90)
- IRI 53-97 IND (-44)

#	Tournament	Position	Pld	W	L	PF	PA	PD
1	2009 FIBA Asia Under-16 Championship for Women	Did not participate						
2	2011 FIBA Asia Under-16 Championship for Women	Did not participate						
3	2013 FIBA Asia Under-16 Championship for Women	Did not participate						
4	2015 FIBA Asia Under-16 Championship for Women	Did not participate						
5	2017 FIBA Under-16 Women's Asian Championship Division B	4th place	6	3	3	470	390	+80
6	2022 FIBA Under-16 Women's Asian Championship Division B	5th place	5	3	2	268	242	+26
7	2023 FIBA Under-16 Women's Asian Championship Division B	2nd place, silver medalist(s)	5	4	1	353	322	+31
8	2025 FIBA Under-16 Women's Asian Championship Division B	2nd place, silver medalist(s)	6	4	2	398	289	+109
Total	4/8		22	14	8	1,489	1,243	+246

== U16 West Asia Cup record ==
#	Tournament	Position	Pld	W	L	PF	PA	PD
1	2025 U16 Women's West Asia Cup	1st place, gold medalist(s)	4	3	1	-	-	-
Total	1/1		4	3	1	-	-	-

== 2023 Roster ==
1. Zahra YAZDANI ZAZERANI Point Guard 161 cm Leonard Shahinshahr 19/02/2007
2. Fatemeh JAFARI Shooting Guard 170 cm Shahr Qods 15/06/2007
3. Helya HOUDNEH Power Forward 176 cm Hyper Academy 27/03/2007
4. Maedeh MORIDI KHORGOO Small Forward 175 cm Naft Setare Khalij Fars 17/03/2008
5. Zahra ZAREI Point Guard 163 cm Khane Basketball Kazeroun 28/05/2007
6. ZahraSadat BAZOOBANDI Point Guard 165 cm khane basketball Neyshabour 23/08/2008
7. Ghazal JAFARI Power Forward 179 cm Leonard Shahinshahr 02/07/2008
8. Mobina RAHIMI Small Forward 173 cm Shahr Qods 01/03/2008
9. Fatemeh DERISAVI ZADEH Small Forward 172 cm Naft Abadan 27/04/2007
10. Asal FAEZ Center 175 cm Shakelli 29/07/2008
11. HaniehSadat HOSSEINI Center 179 cm khane basketball Neyshabour 31/05/2008
12. Ghazal ZAMANI DEHYAGHOUBI Power Forward 180 cm Nasrollahi 24/10/2007

Average height:172 cm

Average age:15 years old

== See also ==
- Iran women's national basketball team
- Iran women's national under-18 basketball team
- Iran men's national under-16 basketball team
