= Karisma Arena =

Sports venue in Seremban, Malaysia

- Arena Seremban
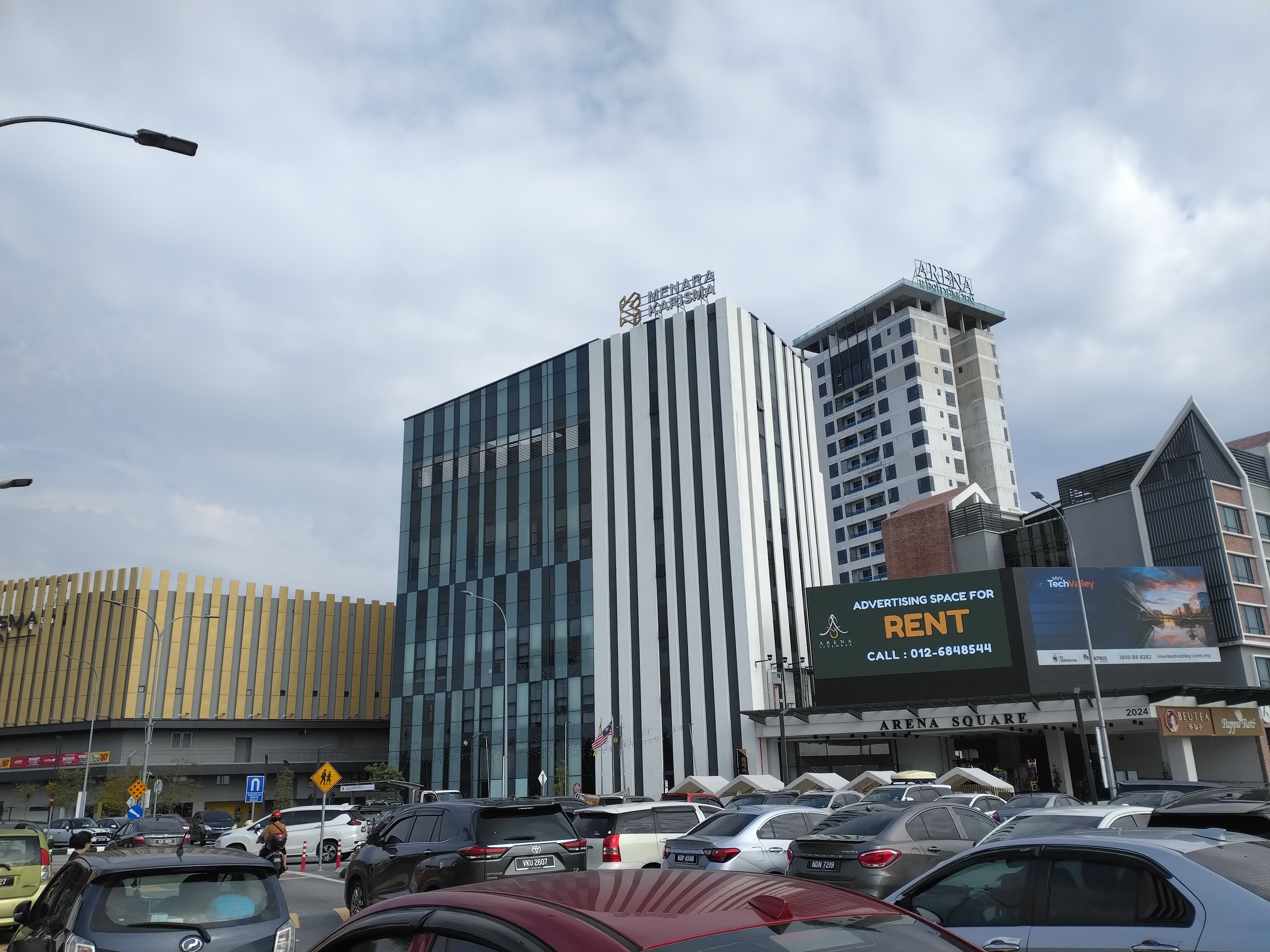
- Kompleks Arena Seremban with the indoor arena on the left (gold).
- Interactive map of Karisma Arena
- Address: Kompleks Arena Seremban; Seremban; Malaysia
- Owner: Karisma Perwira
- Capacity: 3,000
- Type: Indoor arena

Construction
- Opened: 8 June 2025
- Project manager: Matrix Concepts

Tenant
- NS Matrix Deers

Website
- karismaarena.com

The Karisma Arena, also known as the Arena Seremban, is an indoor arena within the Kompleks Arena Seremban in Seremban, Malaysia.

== History ==
The Karisma Arena is an indoor arena built as part of a larger integrated development called the Kompleks Arena Seremban which includes a hotel, office and residential spaces. Construction for the arena meant to fulfill FIBA standards was ongoing as early as 2022.

The Karisma Arena opened on 8 June 2025, ahead of the inauguration of the Kompleks Arena Seremban on 28 June 2025.

The venue hosted the 2025 FIBA U16 Women's Asia Cup.

== Facilities ==
The Karisma Arena is a seven-storey indoor arena which has a seating capacity of 3,000.The whole Kompleks Arena Seremban is owned by Karisma Perwira of Lee Tian Hock and is managed by Matrix Concepts Holdings.
