= Jordan women's national under-16 basketball team =

Jordan
- FIBA zone: FIBA Asia
- National federation: Jordan Basketball Federation

U17 World Cup
- Appearances: None

U16 Asia Cup
- Appearances: 1
- Medals: None

U16 Asia Cup Division B
- Appearances: 2
- Medals: None

The Jordan women's national under-16 basketball team is a national basketball team of Jordan, administered by the Jordan Basketball Federation. It represents the country in international under-16 women's basketball competitions.

== FIBA U16 Asia Cup participations ==
| Year | Division A | Division B |
|---|---|---|
| 2013 | 11th | —N/a |
| 2022 | —N/a | 8th |
| 2023 | —N/a | 5th |

== See also ==
- Jordan women's national basketball team
- Jordan men's national under-16 basketball team
