= Maxine Sutisna =

Indonesian basketball player (born 2007)

No. 5 – Cal State Fullerton Titans
- Position: Guard
- League: Big West Conference

Personal information
- Born: 15 January 2007 (age 19) Jakarta, Indonesia
- Listed height: 5 ft 9 in (1.75 m)
- Listed weight: 64 kg (141 lb)

Career information
- High school: SMAN 70 (Jakarta, Indonesia); Archbishop Riordan (San Francisco, California)
- College: Cal State Fullerton (2025-present)

Maxine Maria Sutisna (born January 15, 2007) is an Indonesian college basketball player for the Cal State Fullerton Titans of the Big West Conference (BWC). She is one of the few Indonesians to play in the NCAA Division I (the other being Theresna Ninon Salemon).

== Personal life ==
Maxine was born in Jakarta, to Michael Sutisna and Maura Tupamahu. Has two siblings, Margaux and Mikael, and is majoring in kinesiology.

== High school career ==
With her two seasons playing for SMAN 70 Jakarta in the Development Basketball League (DBL), she won two championships and also two MVP awards. She secured a spot in the DBL Girls's All-Star 2022 and 2023 which were played in Chicago, Illinois. After their 2023 All-Star campaign, Sutisna accepted a scholarship offer from the San Francisco, California based-school Archbishop Riordan. She was named Second Team All Western Catholic Athletic League and was the team captain for her junior and senior year at Riordan. She was ranked the number 14 prospect from the Northern California Class of 2025. She is the first NCAA Division 1 athlete from Archbishop Riordan.

After graduation, Sutisna announced that she has offers from Cal State Fullerton, Cal State Northridge, and Portland State.

== College career ==
On August 12, 2024, Maxine committed to Cal State Fullerton.

== National team career ==
Sutisna represented the Indonesia under-18 squad in the 2024 FIBA U18 Women's Asia Cup in Shenzhen, China. She collected an average of 9.3 points, 6.5 rebounds, and 0.8 assists. Her highest-scoring game was against New Zealand, where she scored 14 points in 23 minutes played.
