= Jinan Olympic Sports Center =

Sports venue in Jinan, China

Coordinates: 36.656646°N 117.110052°E

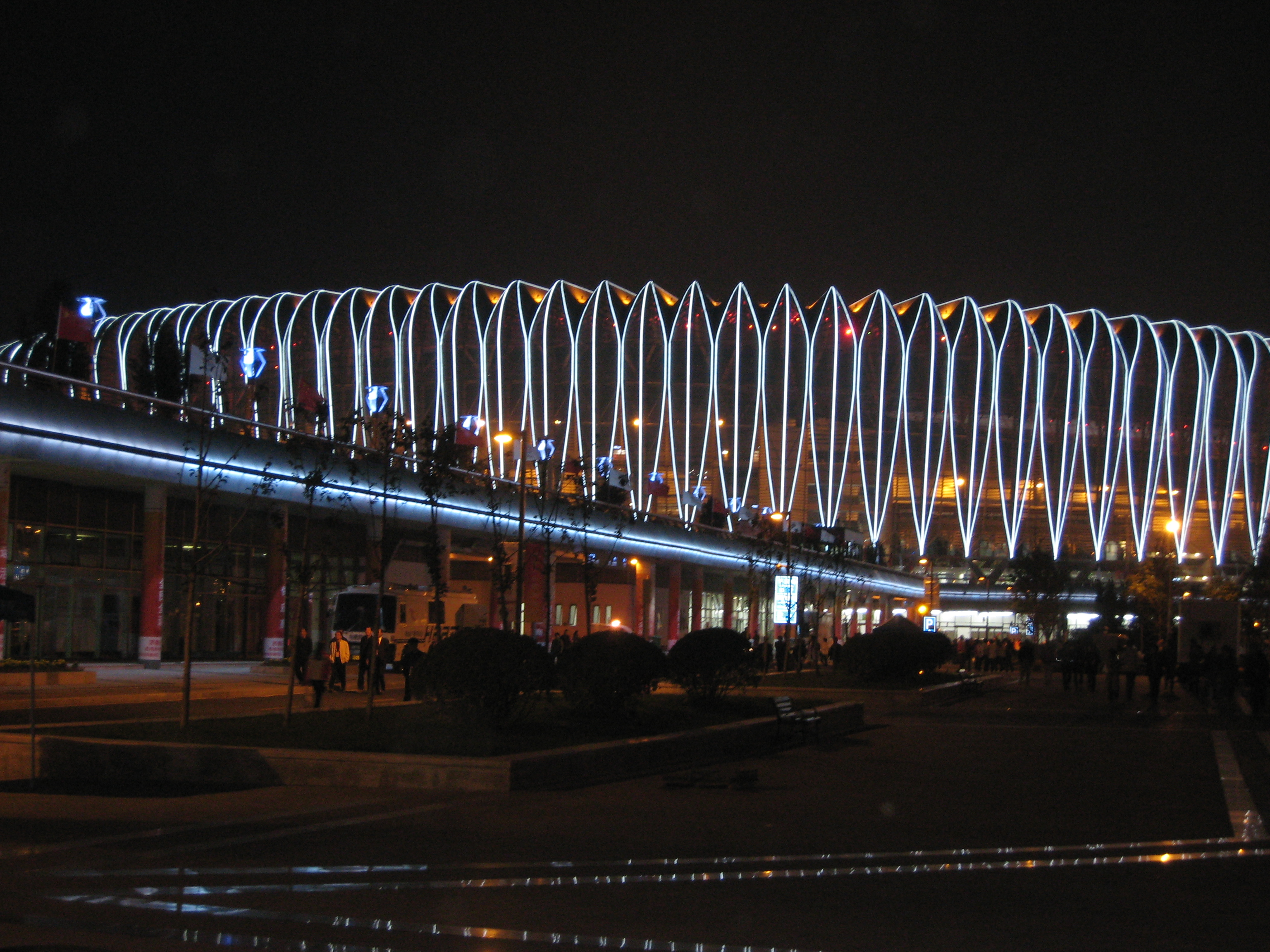
Jinan Olympic Sports Center

Jinan Olympic Sports Center (Chinese: 济南奥林匹克体育中心; pinyin: Jǐnán Àolínpǐkè Tǐyù Zhōngxīn) is a sports venue in Jinan, China. It is located in the south-east of the city. The area is home to the main sports venues for the 2009 National Games of China in October 2009, including the main Jinan Olympic Sports Center Stadium. The entire precinct is 81 hectares in size.

== Facilities ==
The overall layout of the Jinan Olympic Sports Center is known as Donghe Xiliu (Chinese: 东荷西柳; pinyin: Dōnghé Xīliǔ; lit. 'East Lotus', 'West Willow') due to the distinctive architecture of the venues. Also, the city flower and tree of Jinan are the lotus and Chinese willow, respectively.

- Jinan Olympic Sports Center Stadium - Located on the western side of the center. It is known as Xiliu (西柳) or "West Willow" as the external frame of the stadium resembles willow leaves. It is the main stadium and hosted the opening ceremony, track and field and football events during the National Games.

Located on the eastern half of the center, the following three venues together resemble a lotus flower and are known as Donghe (东荷) or "East Lotus":

- Jinan Olympic Sports Center Gymnasium - Hosted the closing ceremony and gymnastics events of the National Games.
- Jinan Olympic Sports Center Tennis Stadium - An indoor tennis stadium that hosted the preliminaries and finals of the tennis in the National Games.
- Jinan Olympic Sports Center Natatorium - Hosted the swimming and diving events at the National Games.
