= Tatyana Komarova =

- Татьяна Комарова
- Born: Tatyana Markovna Komarova; 19 January 1952; Moscow, Russian SFSR
- Died: 7 December 2010 (aged 58); Moscow, Russia
- Education: MSU Faculty of Journalism
- Occupation: Journalist
- Years active: 1975–2010
- Children: 1

Tatyana Markovna Komarova (Russian: Татьяна Марковна Комарова; 19 January 1952 – 7 December 2010) was a Soviet and Russian journalist. She began her career at the Central Television of the USSR State Television and Radio Broadcasting Company as an low-level editor of the letters department before working for the Vremya news bulletin from 1975, firstly as a science correspondent, commentator, columnist, and finally presenter. Komarova later worked at Ostankino, TV Centre and Russia-1.

== Early life ==
Komarova was born in Moscow on 19 January 1952. Her mother, Elena Izmailovskaya, was in a newscasting group, while her father, Mark Efremovich Albats, was a specialist in submarine missile guidance systems and a radio engineer. Komarova's sister, Yevgenia Albats, is also a journalist. Her grandmother was an actress at the Vakhtangov Theatre. She was a 1974 graduate of the MSU Faculty of Journalism with a journalism degree.

== Career ==
Between 1974 and 1975, Komarova worked at the Central Television of the USSR State Television and Radio Broadcasting Company as an low-level editor of the letters department. She had been a presenter of the All Union First Programme programme Rovesniki, where teenagers and young adults talked about the issues of their peers. Komarova began working for the Vremya news bulletin in 1975. She was firstly a science correspondent, commentator, columnist, and finally presenter, taking up the latter job following the 1991 Soviet coup attempt that August. Komarova frequently travelled to foreign nations, reporting on the charitable work of Raisa Gorbacheva. She was a news reader from 1991 to 1995.

Following the dissolution of the Soviet Union, Komarova worked at Ostankino, where she wrote and hosted the ORT news programme Wait for an Answer. She left ORT in 1995, and joined the Moscow Television Channel as a columnist in June 1996. Komarova was the presenter of the weekly news programmes Good Evening, Moscow and Minister for a Day. She presented the weekly talk shows Together from 1996 to 1997, the woman's talk show 12 Determined Women between October 1997 and 1999 and Okhotny Ryad from September 1998. In 1997, Komarova was appointed chief producer of the Social and Economic Programs Service of TV Centre.

From 18 April 1999, she presented the TV Centre programme VDNKh - a new version on Sundays, and authored and presented Archive Secrets on Russia-1 from the end of 2000. Komarova was the author of numerous Channel One documentaries. She was vice-rector for research and creative work at the GITR Film and Television School.

== Personal life ==
Komarova was married to a businessman. She had a daughter. Komarova died of acute renal failure in Moscow on 7 December 2010. Her funeral was held on 9 December, and she was buried at Pyatnitskoye Cemetery.
