= 2025 FIBA U16 Women's Asia Cup =

International under-16 basketball tournament

8th FIBA Under-16 Women's Asian Basketball Championship

Tournament details
- Host country: Malaysia
- City: Seremban
- Dates: 13–28 September
- Teams: 16 (from 1 confederation)
- Venue: 1 (in 1 host city)

Final positions
- Champions: Australia (4th title)
- Runners-up: New Zealand
- Third place: Japan
- Fourth place: China

Tournament statistics
- MVP: (Japan) Miya Takeuchi

Official website
- Division A Division B

The 2025 FIBA U16 Women's Asia Cup was an international under-16 girls' basketball tournament that was played from 13 to 28 September 2025 in Seremban, Malaysia.

The eighth edition of the biennial competition, this was also the FIBA Asia's qualifying tournament for the 2026 FIBA Under-17 Women's Basketball World Cup in the Czech Republic, where the top four teams qualified.

== Qualified teams ==
For Division A:

- Top seven teams of the 2023 FIBA U16 Women's Asian Championship:
  - Australia
  - Japan
  - New Zealand
  - Chinese Taipei
  - South Korea
  - China
  - Syria
- Division B winners at the 2023 FIBA U16 Women's Asian Championship:
  - Philippines

For Division B:

- The host nation:
  - Malaysia
- Team from the Division A at the 2023 FIBA U16 Women's Asian Championship:
  - Samoa
- 3rd placer of the 2024 FIBA U15 Women's Oceania Cup:
  - Tonga
- Central Asia:
  - Uzbekistan
- East Asia:
  - Hong Kong
- Gulf:
  - N/A
- South Asia – SABA Qualifiers winners:
  - India
- Southeast Asia – SEABA Qualifiers winners:
  - Indonesia
- West Asia – WABA Qualifiers winners:
  - Iran

Included are the FIBA Girls' World Rankings prior to the tournament for all participating teams in each division.

Division A	Division B
Australia (5); Japan (6); China (18); South Korea (21); New Zealand (24); Chinese Taipei (27); Philippines (43); Syria (56)	Samoa (44); Malaysia (55); Indonesia (62); India (64); Iran (65); Hong Kong (75); Tonga (NR); Uzbekistan (NR)

== Division A ==
All times are local (Malaysian Standard Time; UTC+08:00).

=== Preliminary round ===
==== Group A ====
Pos	Team	Pld	W	L	PF	PA	PD	Pts	Qualification
1	Australia	3	3	0	368	128	+240	6	Semifinals
2	Chinese Taipei	3	2	1	208	257	−49	5	Qualification to Semi-finals
3	Philippines	3	1	2	167	272	−105	4	Qualification to Semi-finals
4	South Korea	3	0	3	198	284	−86	3	Seventh place game

Source: FIBA
Rules for classification: 1) Points; 2) Head-to-head results; 3) Points difference; 4) Points scored.

22 September 2025
11:30

Boxscore

Australia	123–42	Philippines
Scoring by quarter: 33–12, 29–10, 32–10, 29–10
Pts: Fakalata 19; Rebs: Manyok 16; Asts: Hocking 9		Pts: Ramos 16; Rebs: Vinluan 6 Asts: four players 1

Arena Seremban, Seremban
Attendance: 100
Referees: Hu Jing (CHN), Samuel Pan (NZL), Wang Wansong (CHN)

22 September 2025
14:00

Boxscore

Chinese Taipei	88–83	South Korea
Scoring by quarter: 20–24, 35–11, 19–25, 14–23
Pts: Lin 26; Rebs: Lin 9 Asts: Gao 7		Pts: Kim D.H. 25; Rebs: Kim D.H. 16; Asts: Kim D.H. 4

Arena Seremban, Seremban
Attendance: 30
Referees: Elie Rahji (SYR), Hani Salah (SYR)

23 September 2025
11:30

Boxscore

South Korea	40–119	Australia
Scoring by quarter: 5–38, 9–28, 18–22, 8–31
Pts: Han 14; Rebs: Park Jia 6 Asts: Kim D.H., Yoo 2		Pts: Richardson 20; Rebs: Trout 16; Asts: Olechnowicz 6

Arena Seremban, Seremban
Attendance: 100
Referees: Hu Jing (CHN), Hani Salah (SYR), Michelle Chian Yie Tsen (SGP)

23 September 2025
14:00

Boxscore

Philippines	48–74	Chinese Taipei
Scoring by quarter: 12–22, 12–20, 12–18, 12–14
Pts: Smith 14; Rebs: Smith 10; Asts: Smith 4		Pts: Chang Y.T. 17; Rebs: Feng 10; Asts: Gao 6

Arena Seremban, Seremban
Attendance: 100
Referees: Nattapong Jontapa (THA), Elie Rahji (SYR)

24 September 2025
11:30

Boxscore

Australia	126–46	Chinese Taipei
Scoring by quarter: 28–11, 31–15, 32–14, 35–6
Pts: Isabel Smith 19; Rebs: Manyok 12; Asts: Smith 9		Pts: Lin 11; Rebs: Feng 4 Asts: Lin 3

Arena Seremban, Seremban
Attendance: 100
Referees: Hani Salah (SYR), Samuel Pan (NZL)

24 September 2025
14:00

Boxscore

South Korea	75–77	Philippines
Scoring by quarter: 15–17, 23–20, 19–19, 18–21
Pts: Lim 31; Rebs: Kim D.H. 12; Asts: Yoo 5		Pts: Smith 21; Rebs: Ramos 8 Asts: Smith 4

Arena Seremban, Seremban
Attendance: 100
Referees: Yana Nikogossyan (KAZ), Elie Rahji (SYR), Wang Wansong (CHN)

==== Group B ====
Pos	Team	Pld	W	L	PF	PA	PD	Pts	Qualification
1	Japan	3	3	0	286	160	+126	6	Semifinals
2	China	3	2	1	233	179	+54	5	Qualification to Semi-finals
3	New Zealand	3	1	2	255	183	+72	4	Qualification to Semi-finals
4	Syria	3	0	3	82	334	−252	3	Seventh place game

Source: FIBA
Rules for classification: 1) Points; 2) Head-to-head results; 3) Points difference; 4) Points scored.

22 September 2025
16:30

Boxscore

Japan	132–31	Syria
Scoring by quarter: 29–7, 34–8, 30–8, 39–8
Pts: Oda 22; Rebs: Kinoshita 7 Asts: Takeuchi 10		Pts: Balish 8 Rebs: Arabi, Al-Hamwi 4 Asts: Al-Hasan 2

Arena Seremban, Seremban
Attendance: 30
Referees: Madison Crowley-Long (AUS), Lee Dong-hyeon (KOR), Lien Wan-Chen (TPE)

22 September 2025
19:00

Boxscore

New Zealand	74–83	China
Scoring by quarter: 13–15, 13–22, 22–24, 26–22
Pts: S. Broughton 19; Rebs: Ainley 16; Asts: Ainley 4		Pts: Li Yua. 38; Rebs: Li A. 10; Asts: Liu 7

Arena Seremban, Seremban
Attendance: 100
Referees: Yana Nikogossyan (KAZ), Nattapong Jontapa (THA), Kim Ga-in (KOR)

23 September 2025
16:30

Boxscore

China	57–78	Japan
Scoring by quarter: 18–14, 14–21, 12–24, 13–19
Pts: Li Yua. 20; Rebs: Li A. 8 Asts: Meng 3		Pts: Takeuchi 23; Rebs: Hosozawa 10; Asts: Takeuchi 6

Arena Seremban, Seremban
Attendance: 150
Referees: Yana Nikogossyan (KAZ), Le Pham Trung Kien (VIE), Jin Leong Ong (SGP)

23 September 2025
19:00

Boxscore

Syria	24–109	New Zealand
Scoring by quarter: 4–31, 7–26, 8–21, 5–31
Pts: Balish 6 Rebs: Arabi 5 Asts: Hasan Agha, Al-Hasan 2		Pts: Broughton, Eliadis 21; Rebs: Hogben 10; Asts: McClenaghan 6

Arena Seremban, Seremban
Attendance: 100
Referees: Kim Ga-in (KOR), Ralph Lauren Moreto (PHI), Lien Wan-Chen (TPE)

24 September 2025
16:30

Boxscore

Japan	76–72	New Zealand
Scoring by quarter: 17–23, 18–11, 17–25, 24–13
Pts: Takeuchi 19; Rebs: Kobayashi 10; Asts: Takeuchi 6		Pts: S. Broughton 19; Rebs: Ainley 15; Asts: Maurice 4

Arena Seremban, Seremban
Attendance: 50
Referees: Nattapong Jontapa (THA), Kim Ga-in (KOR), Le Pham Trung Kien (VIE)

24 September 2025
19:00

Boxscore

China	93–27	Syria
Scoring by quarter: 23–13, 18–5, 16–0, 36–9
Pts: Liu 15; Rebs: Li Yuq. 9 Asts: three players 4		Pts: Hasan Agha 7 Rebs: Arabi 6 Asts: Al-Hasan 2

Arena Seremban, Seremban
Attendance: 50
Referees: Madison Crowley-Long (AUS), Jin Leong Ong (SGP), Lee Dong-hyeon (KOR)

=== Knockout round ===
==== Bracket ====
Qualification to Semi-finals
26 September
China	82
Philippines	50
26 September
Chinese Taipei	70
New Zealand	74

Semi-finals
27 September
Australia	87
China	59
27 September
Japan	64
New Zealand	68

Final
28 September
Australia	86
New Zealand	50
Third place game
28 September
China	58
Japan	71

Seventh place game
26 September
South Korea	101
Syria	46

Fifth place game
27 September
Chinese Taipei	103
Philippines	72

==== Qualification to Semi-finals ====
26 September 2025
16:30

Boxscore

Chinese Taipei	70–74	New Zealand
Scoring by quarter: 14–27, 24–11, 10–17, 22–19
Pts: Chang H.W., Chang Y.T. 16; Rebs: Hsieh 8 Asts: Lin 7		Pts: C. Broughton 19; Rebs: Jones 10; Asts: Jones 5

Arena Seremban, Seremban
Attendance: 200
Referees: Yana Nikogossyan (KAZ), Elie Rahji (SYR), Jin Leong Ong (SGP)

26 September 2025
19:00

Boxscore

China	82–50	Philippines
Scoring by quarter: 19–21, 26–10, 17–9, 20–10
Pts: Li Yua. 18; Rebs: Sun H. 15; Asts: Sun X. 7		Pts: Smith 14; Rebs: Smith 8 Asts: Smith 4

Arena Seremban, Seremban
Attendance: 100
Referees: Nattapong Jontapa (THA), Kim Ga-in (KOR), Hani Salah (SYR)

==== Semi-finals ====
27 September 2025
16:30

Boxscore

Australia	87–59	China
Scoring by quarter: 20–18, 29–12, 15–18, 23–11
Pts: Ryan 22; Rebs: Manyok, Trout 7 Asts: Smith 4		Pts: Li Yua. 12; Rebs: Li A., Li Yua. 5 Asts: Li Yua., Meng 3

Arena Seremban, Seremban
Attendance: 50
Referees: Yana Nikogossyan (KAZ), Hani Salah (SYR), Lee Dong-hyeon (KOR)

27 September 2025
19:00

Boxscore

Japan	64–68	New Zealand
Scoring by quarter: 17–14, 2–17, 23–17, 22–20
Pts: Takeuchi 23; Rebs: Kobayashi 5 Asts: Takeuchi 7		Pts: Jones, Maurice 15; Rebs: Ainley, S. Broughton 6 Asts: C. Broughton 4

Arena Seremban, Seremban
Attendance: 200
Referees: Nattapong Jontapa (THA), Lien Wan-Chen (TPE), Le Pham Trung Kien (VIE)

==== Seventh place game ====
26 September 2025
14:00

Boxscore

South Korea	101–46	Syria
Scoring by quarter: 32–15, 26–10, 25–7, 18–14
Pts: Han, Lim 21; Rebs: Kim D.H. 13; Asts: Kim D.H. 8		Pts: Al-Hasan 18; Rebs: Arabi 8 Asts: Balish 4

Arena Seremban, Seremban
Attendance: 50
Referees: Hu Jing (CHN), Le Pham Trung Kien (VIE), Lien Wan-Chen (TPE)

==== Fifth place game ====
27 September 2025
14:00

Boxscore

Chinese Taipei	103–72	Philippines
Scoring by quarter: 26–14, 26–20, 26–21, 25–17
Pts: Gao 26; Rebs: Chang Y.T. 10; Asts: Gao 11		Pts: Roman 19; Rebs: Olmos 11; Asts: Ramos 6

Arena Seremban, Seremban
Attendance: 50
Referees: Madison Crowley-Long (AUS), Michelle Chian Yie Tsen (SGP)

==== Third place game ====
28 September 2025
15:30

Boxscore

China	58–71	Japan
Scoring by quarter: 17–19, 17–13, 12–15, 12–24
Pts: Li Yua. 16; Rebs: Sun X. 7 Asts: Sun X. 5		Pts: Takeuchi 25; Rebs: Kobayashi 9 Asts: Takeuchi 4

Arena Seremban, Seremban
Attendance: 100
Referees: Yana Nikogossyan (KAZ), Jin Leong Ong (SGP), Kim Ga-in (KOR)

==== Final ====
28 September 2025
18:00

Boxscore

Australia	86–50	New Zealand
Scoring by quarter: 22–13, 25–14, 19–13, 20–10
Pts: Ryan 15; Rebs: Mapp 7 Asts: Fakalata, Ryan 4		Pts: S. Broughton 10; Rebs: Ainley 8 Asts: Maurice 3

Arena Seremban, Seremban
Attendance: 200
Referees: Hu Jing (CHN), Nattapong Jontapa (THA), Elie Rahji (SYR)

=== Statistics and awards ===
==== Awards ====
2025 FIBA U16 Women's Asian Champions

Australia
4th title

The individual awards were announced on 28 September 2025, after the Division A Final.

All-Star Five
Guards	Forwards	Center
(Australia) Isabel Smith (Japan) Miya Takeuchi	(China) Li Yuanshan (Australia) Madison Ryan	(New Zealand) Emilia Ainley
MVP: (Japan) Miya Takeuchi

== Division B ==
All times are local (Malaysian Standard Time; UTC+08:00).

=== Preliminary round ===
==== Group A ====
Pos	Team	Pld	W	L	PF	PA	PD	Pts	Qualification
1	India	3	3	0	222	190	+32	6	Semifinals
2	Iran	3	2	1	206	169	+37	5	Qualification to Semi-finals
3	Uzbekistan	3	1	2	188	204	−16	4	Qualification to Semi-finals
4	Samoa	3	0	3	161	214	−53	3	Seventh place game

Source: FIBA
Rules for classification: 1) Points; 2) Head-to-head results; 3) Points difference; 4) Points scored.

13 September 2025
11:30

Boxscore

Samoa	62–65	Uzbekistan
Scoring by quarter: 17–16, 16–11, 17–22, 12–16
Pts: Sialeipata 19; Rebs: Sialeipata 13; Asts: Sialeipata 5		Pts: Murodjonova 18; Rebs: Usmanova 10; Asts: Lutfullaeva 5

Arena Seremban, Seremban
Attendance: 35
Referees: Khar Yin Yap (MAS), Nattapong Jontapa (THA), Mandy Ngieng Sing Tong (MAS)

13 September 2025
14:00

Boxscore

India	70–67	Iran
Scoring by quarter: 21–14, 11–19, 18–21, 20–13
Pts: Kulkarni 20; Rebs: Sharma 13; Asts: Birudavolu 7		Pts: Bereihi 18; Rebs: Nemati 9 Asts: Bereihi 4

Arena Seremban, Seremban
Attendance: 35
Referees: Yana Nikogossyan (KAZ), Via Diah Rohmana (INA), Tan Kian Hua (MAS)

14 September 2025
11:30

Boxscore

Iran	78–45	Samoa
Scoring by quarter: 20–11, 21–7, 17–18, 20–9
Pts: Kazem Evini 13; Rebs: Nemati 12; Asts: Ahmadian, Mehrmand 6		Pts: Newton-Taito 10; Rebs: Sialeipata 8 Asts: Mareta-Manu 6

Arena Seremban, Seremban
Attendance: 54
Referees: Nattapong Jontapa (THA), Via Diah Rohmana (INA)

14 September 2025
14:00

Boxscore

Uzbekistan	69–81	India
Scoring by quarter: 22–17, 16–26, 14–18, 17–20
Pts: Lutfullaeva 19; Rebs: Salimova 14; Asts: Khalikova 4		Pts: Jonnalagadda 24; Rebs: Jonnalagadda 13; Asts: Birudavolu 10

Arena Seremban, Seremban
Attendance: 54
Referees: Yana Nikogossyan (KAZ), Natasha Ah-Hing (TGA), Sze Nga Chris Wu (HKG)

15 September 2025
11:30

Boxscore

Samoa	54–71	India
Scoring by quarter: 12–21, 16–7, 15–20, 11–23
Pts: Filemu 18; Rebs: Sialeipata 17; Asts: Sialeipata 6		Pts: Kulkarni 20; Rebs: Sharma 15; Asts: Birudavolu 10

Arena Seremban, Seremban
Attendance: 50
Referees: Mandy Ngieng Sing Tong (MAS), Sze Nga Chris Wu (HKG), Tan Kian Hua (MAS)

15 September 2025
14:00

Boxscore

Iran	61–54	Uzbekistan
Scoring by quarter: 17–15, 13–12, 16–17, 15–10
Pts: Khazaei 16; Rebs: Khazaei 14; Asts: Bereihi 6		Pts: Khalikova 25; Rebs: Salimova 15; Asts: Khalikova, Murodjonova 2

Arena Seremban, Seremban
Attendance: 50
Referees: Nattapong Jontapa (THA), Khar Yin Yap (MAS), Le Pham Trung Kien (VIE)

==== Group B ====
Pos	Team	Pld	W	L	PF	PA	PD	Pts	Qualification
1	Hong Kong	3	2	1	201	197	+4	5 (Note: Hong Kong 1–0 Indonesia)	Semifinals
2	Indonesia	3	2	1	220	175	+45	5	Qualification to Semi-finals
3	Malaysia (H)	3	1	2	175	185	−10	4 (Note: Malaysia 1–0 Tonga)	Qualification to Semi-finals
4	Tonga	3	1	2	169	208	−39	4	Seventh place game

Source: FIBA
Rules for classification: 1) Points; 2) Head-to-head results; 3) Points difference; 4) Points scored.
(H) Hosts
Notes:

13 September 2025
16:30

Boxscore

Indonesia	71–74	Hong Kong
Scoring by quarter: 21–15, 20–20, 17–6, 13–33
Pts: Welly 14; Rebs: Kustiawan 7 Asts: Adiutomo 4		Pts: Lau 20; Rebs: Lau 9 Asts: Leung W.Y. 3

Arena Seremban, Seremban
Attendance: 50
Referees: Jacquiline Dover (AUS), Jin Leong Ong (SGP), Arundhaty Banerjee (IND)

13 September 2025
19:00

Boxscore

Malaysia	70–47	Tonga
Scoring by quarter: 16–15, 12–12, 22–7, 20–13
Pts: Teo, Yap 13; Rebs: Gaong 10; Asts: Ea Cheem 4		Pts: Folau 16; Rebs: Tuihalangingie-Midson 12; Asts: Folau 2

Arena Seremban, Seremban
Attendance: 50
Referees: Mahsa Kargari (IRI), Le Pham Trung Kien (VIE), David Raju Dharnalakota (IND)

14 September 2025
16:30

Boxscore

Hong Kong	72–61	Malaysia
Scoring by quarter: 21–18, 18–9, 21–14, 12–20
Pts: Lau 22; Rebs: Lee 11; Asts: Lau, Lui 3		Pts: Ea Cheem 16; Rebs: Gaong 6 Asts: Long 4

Arena Seremban, Seremban
Attendance: 200
Referees: Jacquiline Dover (AUS), Le Pham Trung Kien (VIE), Arundhaty Banerjee (IND)

14 September 2025
19:00

Boxscore

Tonga	57–83	Indonesia
Scoring by quarter: 11–23, 9–25, 20–24, 17–11
Pts: Cutbush 13; Rebs: Wolfgramm 8 Asts: Cutbush, Folau 3		Pts: Celesta 19; Rebs: Celesta 18; Asts: Celesta 4

Arena Seremban, Seremban
Attendance: 50
Referees: Mahsa Kargari (IRI), Jin Leong Ong (SGP), Michelle Chian Yie Tsen (SGP)

15 September 2025
14:30

Boxscore

Malaysia	44–66	Indonesia
Scoring by quarter: 12–14, 12–25, 11–13, 9–14
Pts: Long 9 Rebs: Teo 7 Asts: Long 2		Pts: Giovanni 16; Rebs: Celesta 14; Asts: Adiutomo 3

Arena Seremban, Seremban
Attendance: 300
Referees: Yana Nikogossyan (KAZ), Mahsa Kargari (IRI), Jin Leong Ong (SGP)

15 September 2025
19:00

Boxscore

Hong Kong	55–65	Tonga
Scoring by quarter: 18–21, 16–14, 10–14, 11–16
Pts: Lau 19; Rebs: Lee 10; Asts: Lui 3		Pts: Folau 14; Rebs: Lolohea, Vaka 12; Asts: Folau 4

Arena Seremban, Seremban
Attendance: 50
Referees: Jacquiline Dover (AUS), Arundhaty Banerjee (IND), David Raju Dharnalakota (IND)

=== Knockout round ===
==== Bracket ====
Qualification to Semi-finals
17 September
Indonesia	77
Uzbekistan	52
17 September
Iran	62
Malaysia	33

Semi-finals
18 September
India	65
Indonesia	53
18 September
Hong Kong	20
Iran	64

Final
19 September
India	67
Iran	66
Third place game
19 September
Indonesia	51
Hong Kong	30

Seventh place game
17 September
Samoa	60
Tonga	67

Fifth place game
18 September
Malaysia	47
Uzbekistan	54

==== Qualification to Semi-finals ====
17 September 2025
16:30

Boxscore

Indonesia	77–52	Uzbekistan
Scoring by quarter: 17–14, 24–12, 16–11, 20–15
Pts: Welly 23; Rebs: Celesta 9 Asts: Welly 3		Pts: Usmanova 14; Rebs: Usmanova 12; Asts: Murodjonova 4

Arena Seremban, Seremban
Attendance: 100
Referees: Jacquiline Dover (AUS), Nattapong Jontapa (THA), Michelle Chian Yie Tsen (SGP)

17 September 2025
19:00

Boxscore

Iran	62–33	Malaysia
Scoring by quarter: 19–8, 13–11, 13–4, 17–10
Pts: Kazem Evini 25; Rebs: Khazaei 13; Asts: Kazem Evini, Khazaei 3		Pts: Chin 12; Rebs: Gaong 7 Asts: Chin, Ea Cheem 2

Arena Seremban, Seremban
Attendance: 150
Referees: Yana Nikogossyan (KAZ), Jin Leong Ong (SGP), Le Pham Trung Kien (VIE)

==== Semi-finals ====
18 September 2025
16:30

Boxscore

India	65–53	Indonesia
Scoring by quarter: 11–11, 13–13, 20–16, 21–13
Pts: Jonnalagadda 22; Rebs: Jonnalagadda, Sharma 12; Asts: Pardeshi 7		Pts: Welly 13; Rebs: Celesta 8 Asts: Hendyawan 4

Arena Seremban, Seremban
Attendance: 50
Referees: Yana Nikogossyan (KAZ), Tan Kian Hua (MAS), Le Pham Trung Kien (VIE)

18 September 2025
19:00

Boxscore

Hong Kong	20–64	Iran
Scoring by quarter: 10–19, 4–12, 6–18, 0–15
Pts: Wong 6 Rebs: Lui 8 Asts: six players 1		Pts: Ahmadian 14; Rebs: Aminidehyadegari 8 Asts: Ahmadian, Kazem Evini 4

Arena Seremban, Seremban
Attendance: 50
Referees: Jacquiline Dover (AUS), Nattapong Jontapa (THA), Jin Leong Ong (SGP)

==== Seventh place game ====
17 September 2025
14:00

Boxscore

Samoa	60–67	Tonga
Scoring by quarter: 16–24, 20–14, 13–12, 11–17
Pts: Sialeipata 18; Rebs: Muliaumasealii 10; Asts: Sialeipata 3		Pts: Cutbush 17; Rebs: Lolohea 7 Asts: Folau 6

Arena Seremban, Seremban
Attendance: 50
Referees: Mahsa Kargari (IRI), Via Diah Rohmana (INA), Mandy Ngieng Sing Tong (MAS)

==== Fifth place game ====
18 September 2025
14:00

Boxscore

Malaysia	47–54	Uzbekistan
Scoring by quarter: 5–16, 12–7, 12–17, 18–14
Pts: Long 15; Rebs: Te 7 Asts: Tiu 4		Pts: Lutfullaeva 17; Rebs: Lutfullaeva 13; Asts: Lutfullaeva 3

Arena Seremban, Seremban
Attendance: 80
Referees: Sze Nga Chris Wu (HKG), Natasha Ah-Hing (TGA), Arundhaty Banerjee (IND)

==== Third place game ====
19 September 2025
15:30

Boxscore

Indonesia	51–30	Hong Kong
Scoring by quarter: 7–7, 16–6, 23–6, 5–11
Pts: three players 9 Rebs: Harshita 12; Asts: Kustiawan 6		Pts: Valerie Lau, Leung W.Y. 8 Rebs: three players 8 Asts: Lau 2

Arena Seremban, Seremban
Attendance: 70
Referees: Mahsa Kargari (IRI), Khar Yin Yap (MAS), Michelle Chian Yie Tsen (SGP)

==== Final ====
19 September 2025
18:00

Boxscore

India	67–66	Iran
Scoring by quarter: 17–13, 15–19, 20–10, 15–24
Pts: Jonnalagadda 21; Rebs: Sharma 18; Asts: Kulkarni 3		Pts: Bereihi 30; Rebs: Nemati 14; Asts: Ahmadian, Kazem Evini 3

Arena Seremban, Seremban
Attendance: 150
Referees: Yana Nikogossyan (KAZ), Jacquiline Dover (AUS), Mandy Ngieng Sing Tong (MAS)

== Final standings ==
Division A
Rank	Team	Record
1st place, gold medalist(s)	Australia	5–0
2nd place, silver medalist(s)	New Zealand	3–3
3rd place, bronze medalist(s)	Japan	4–1
4	China	3–3
5	Chinese Taipei	3–2
6	Philippines	1–4
7	South Korea	1–3
8	Syria	0–4

Qualified for the 2026 FIBA Under-17 Women's Basketball World Cup
Relegated to Division B of the 2027 FIBA U16 Women's Asia Cup

Division B
Rank	Team	Record
1st place, gold medalist(s)	India	5–0
2nd place, silver medalist(s)	Iran	4–2
3rd place, bronze medalist(s)	Indonesia	4–2
4	Hong Kong	2–3
5	Uzbekistan	2–3
6	Malaysia	1–4
7	Tonga	2–2
8	Samoa	0–4

Promoted to Division A of the 2027 FIBA U16 Women's Asia Cup
