= Indonesia women's national under-16 basketball team =

Indonesia women's U-16
- FIBA zone: FIBA Asia
- National federation: PERBASI

FIBA U-17 World Cup
- Appearances: 1
- Medals: None

FIBA U-16 Asia Cup
- Appearances: 2
- Medals: None

FIBA U-16 Asia Cup Division B
- Appearances: 2
- Medals: Bronze: 2025

The Indonesia women's national under-16 basketball team is a national basketball team of Indonesia, administered by the Indonesian Basketball Association ("PERBASI"). It represents the country in international under-16 women's basketball competitions.

== FIBA Under-17 Women's Basketball World Cup participations ==
Year	Pos.	Pld	W	L
(France) 2010	Did not qualify			
(Netherlands) 2012	Did not qualify			
(Czech Republic) 2014	Did not qualify			
(Spain) 2016	Did not qualify			
(Belarus) 2018	Did not qualify			
(Hungary) 2022	Did not qualify			
(Mexico) 2024	Did not qualify			
(Czech Republic) 2026	Did not qualify			
(Indonesia) 2028	Qualified as host			
Total	1/9	0	0	0

== FIBA Under-16 Women's Asia Cup participations ==
Year	Division A	Division B
2013	10th	—N/a
2015	8th	—N/a
2022	—N/a	7th
2025	—N/a	3rd place, bronze medalist(s)

== See also ==
- Indonesia women's national basketball team
- Indonesia women's national under-18 basketball team
- Indonesia men's national under-16 basketball team
