= Manmeet Kaur (basketball) =

Indian basketball player (born 2005)

Manmeet Kaur (born 11 November 2005) is an Indian basketball player from Punjab. She plays for the India women's national basketball team as a center. She plays for Punjab in the domestic tournaments.

== Early life and career ==
Kaur is from Ludhiana, Punjab.

Kaur was selected to play the second Junior NBA Global Championship, Orlando, Florida, USA in August 2019. The selections for the 20-member Indian girls team were held at the NBA academy in Delhi in July 2019.

In February 2025, she is selected for the Indian team to play the 3rd South Asian Basketball Association Women's Championship 2025 qualifiers at New Delhi from 23 to 26 February 2025. The Indian team played Maldives and Nepal for a berth in the FIBA women's Asia Cup. She played both the matches, and the final against Maldives, at Delhi.

In January 2025, she was also part of the Punjab team that finished fourth in the 74th Senior National Basketball Championship losing the bronze medal match to Karnataka by 76–77. She also played for the Punjab team that reached the semifinals in the National Games in Uttarakhand in 2025.

Earlier in 2022, she played the FIBA Under 18 Women's Asian Championship 2022 Division A and the FIBA Under 16 Women's Asian Championship 2021 Division A. She was also part of the Ludhiana 3x3 teams.

She also represented India at the 2022 Asian Games but as a junior player did not get enough minutes on the court.
