= Lin Wen-yu =

Taiwanese volleyball player (born 1982)

Lin Wen Yu

Personal information
- Nationality: Chinese Taipei
- Born: 21 November 1982 (age 43)
- Height: 169 cm (67 in)
- Weight: 55 kg (121 lb)
- Spike: 280 cm (110 in)
- Block: 270 cm (106 in)

Volleyball information
- Number: 4 (national team)

National team
2002-2007	Chinese Taipei

Lin Wen-Yu (born 21 November 1982) is a retired Taiwanese female volleyball player. She was part of the Chinese Taipei women's national volleyball team.

She participated in the 2007 FIVB Volleyball World Grand Prix. She participated at the 2002 Asian Games.
