= Syria women's national under-16 basketball team =

Syria
- FIBA ranking: 56 ▼5 (December 2024)
- Joined FIBA: 1948
- FIBA zone: FIBA Asia
- National federation: Syrian Basketball Federation
- Coach: Ricardo González Dávila (2023)
- Nickname(s): Nosour Qasioun (Arabic: نسور قاسيون, lit. 'Qasioun Eagles')

U17 World Cup
- Appearances: None

U16 Asia Cup
- Appearances: 1
- Medals: None

U16 Asia Cup Division B
- Appearances: 1
- Medals: (silver) Silver: 1 (2022)

Under-16 Women's West Asian Championship
- Appearances: 2
- Medals: (gold) Gold: 2 (2019, 2023)
Home	Away

The Syria women's national under-16 basketball team is a national basketball team of Syria, administered by the Syrian Basketball Federation. It represents the country in international under-16 women's basketball competitions.

The team participated in the FIBA Under-16 Women's Asian Championship for the first time in 2022, finishing second in the Division B of the tournament after losing to Samoa in the final.

== Competition record ==
=== FIBA Under-17 Women's Basketball World Cup ===
Syria has not yet qualified for the FIBA Under-17 Women's Basketball World Cup.

=== FIBA Under-16 Women's Asia Cup ===
FIBA Under-16 Women's Asia Cup record
Year	Division A				Division B			
Year	Position	Pld	W	L	Position	Pld	W	L
(India) 2009	Did not participate				No Division B			
(China) 2011	Did not participate				No Division B			
(Sri Lanka) 2013	Did not participate				No Division B			
(Indonesia) 2015	Did not participate				No Division B			
(India) 2017	Did not participate							
(Jordan) 2022	Played in Division B				2nd place	6	4	2
(Jordan) 2023	8th place	5	1	4	Played in Division A			

=== U16 Women's West Asian Championship ===
Year	Position	Pld	W	L
(Syria) 2019	Champions	2	2	0
(Iraq) 2023	Champions	4	3	1
Total		6	5	1

== Current squad ==
Current roster for the 2023 FIBA U16 Women's Asian Championship Division A.

Syria women's national under-16 basketball team roster
Players
Coaches

Pos.	No.	Name	Age – Date of birth	Height	Club	Ctr.
SF	1	Miral Al Hasan	14 – 25 May 2009	1.68 m (5 ft 6 in)	Al-Ittihad	(Syria)
PG	3	Sara Dawalibi	15 – 8 January 2008	1.63 m (5 ft 4 in)	Al-Ittihad	(Syria)
PG	6	Mirella Tchaparian	14 – 18 July 2008	1.65 m (5 ft 5 in)	Al-Yarmouk	(Syria)
PF	7	Aya Al Mohammad	15 – 1 January 2007	1.71 m (5 ft 7 in)	Al Wahda	(Syria)
G	8	Luna Ayash	16 – 18 January 2007	1.70 m (5 ft 7 in)	Al-Jaish	(Syria)
G	10	Zeina Backour	13 – 14 February 2010	1.65 m (5 ft 5 in)	Al-Hurriya	(Syria)
PG	11	Jana Al Mousannef	16 – 11 March 2007	1.61 m (5 ft 3 in)	Al-Wahda	(Syria)
C	15	Lilete Sarkis	15 – 10 October 2007	1.75 m (5 ft 9 in)	Al-Yarmouk	(Syria)
C	23	Nour Al Younes	15 – 22 August 2007	1.70 m (5 ft 7 in)	Al Wahda	(Syria)
G	24	Sandra Safar	16 – 3 January 2007	1.65 m (5 ft 5 in)	Al-Jalaa	(Syria)
SF	30	Shatha Arabi	13 – 24 August 2009	1.70 m (5 ft 7 in)	Al-Aschrafya	(Syria)
SF	33	Zeen Ghanaimi	16 – 1 January 2007	1.68 m (5 ft 6 in)	Al-Hurriya	(Syria)

Head coach

- (Spain) Ricardo González Dávila

Assistant coach(es)

- (Syria) Ashraf Alldarkazalli

Legend

- Club – describes last
  club before the tournament
- Age – describes age
  on 10 July 2023

== Past squads ==
Roster for the 2022 FIBA U16 Women's Asian Championship Division B.

Syria women's national under-16 basketball team roster
Players
Coaches

Pos.	No.	Name	Age – Date of birth	Height	Club	Ctr.
SF	1	Sahar Kanaan	16 – 19 October 2005	1.65 m (5 ft 5 in)	Al Wahda	(Syria)
SG	4	Sedra Kurdi	17 – 1 January 2005	1.64 m (5 ft 5 in)	Al-Ittihad	(Syria)
SG	5	Jana Al Mousannef	15 – 11 March 2007	1.61 m (5 ft 3 in)		(Syria)
PF	9	Simel Alahmar	17 – 24 April 2005	1.73 m (5 ft 8 in)	Al-Jalaa	(Syria)
PF	10	Suzan Backour	17 – 25 May 2005	1.74 m (5 ft 9 in)	Al-Hurriya	(Syria)
C	11	Sonia Jamsakian	16 – 14 April 2006	1.81 m (5 ft 11 in)	Al-Yarmouk	(Syria)
PF	12	Nawal Mardou	17 – 9 January 2005	1.73 m (5 ft 8 in)	Al-Thawra	(Syria)
SG	14	Laila Hasan Agha	16 – 8 January 2006	1.65 m (5 ft 5 in)	Huteen	(Syria)
PF	23	Julie Khreim	16 – 14 May 2006	1.79 m (5 ft 10 in)	Al Wahda	(Syria)
C	66	Elissa Doubal	17 – 8 January 2005	1.82 m (6 ft 0 in)	Al-Thawra	(Syria)
PF	70	Aya Al Mohammad	15 – 1 January 2007	1.67 m (5 ft 6 in)	Al Wahda	(Syria)
SF	77	Shahd Albada	16 – 12 May 2006	1.73 m (5 ft 8 in)	Huteen	(Syria)

Head coach

- (Syria) Ashraf Alldarkazalli

Assistant coach(es)

- (Syria) Shirin Shikh Ismail

Legend

- Club – describes last
  club before the tournament
- Age – describes age
  on 29 June 2022

== See also ==
- Syria women's national basketball team
- Syria women's national under-18 basketball team
- Syria men's national under-16 basketball team
