= 2011 FIBA Asia Under-16 Championship for Women =

2nd FIBA Under-16 Women's Asian Basketball Championship

Tournament details
- Host country: China
- City: Jinan
- Dates: 4–11 December
- Teams: 12 (from 1 confederation)
- Venue: 1 (in 1 host city)

Final positions
- Champions: Japan (1st title)
- Runners-up: South Korea
- Third place: China

Tournament statistics
- Top scorer: (Sri Lanka) Perera (20.8)
- Top rebounds: (Uzbekistan) Asanova (19.0)
- Top assists: (China) Yang L.W. (4.6)
- PPG (Team): China (107.9)
- RPG (Team): China (57.1)
- APG (Team): China (17.6)

Official website
- 2011 FIBA Asia U-16 Championship for Women

The 2011 FIBA Asia Under-16 Championship for Women is the qualifying tournament for FIBA Asia at the Under-17 World Championship for Women 2012. The tournament was supposed to be held in Urumqi, China from 5 to 12 October, but was moved to another venue due to unavoidable and unforeseen circumstances. The games were moved to Jinan, China from 4 to 11 December. Japan, notched their maiden title after thrashing Korea in the Championship match.

== Participating teams ==
Level I	Level II
China; Japan; Chinese Taipei; South Korea; India; Philippines	Malaysia; Hong Kong; Singapore; Sri Lanka; Macau; Uzbekistan

== Preliminary round ==
=== Level I ===
Team	Pld	W	L	PF	PA	PD	Pts
Japan	5	5	0	478	303	+175	10
China	5	4	1	572	319	+253	9
South Korea	5	3	2	394	372	+22	8
Chinese Taipei	5	2	3	463	410	+53	7
India	5	1	4	305	469	−164	6
Philippines	5	0	5	199	538	−339	5

December 4
15:00

Report

South Korea	85–57	India
Scoring by quarter: 25–8, 30–12, 23–17, 7–20
Pts: Kim S.O. 15; Rebs: Yang I.Y. 13; Asts: Four players 3		Pts: Poojamol 17; Rebs: Limaye 13; Asts: Akula 4

Olympic Sports Center, Jinan
Referees: Leong Chuen Wing (SIN), Lim Sok Hoon (MAS), Karmen Tam (HKG)

December 4
17:00

Report

China	87–92	Japan
Scoring by quarter: 20–20, 14–24, 24–22, 29–26
Pts: Gong L. 23; Rebs: Gong L. 10; Asts: Yang L.W. 9		Pts: Yamada 21; Rebs: Nakamura 10; Asts: Yamada 3

Olympic Sports Center, Jinan
Referees: Fabiana Nițu (ROU), Tan Yee Nee (SIN), Tio Juun Hau (MAS)

December 4
20:30

Report

Philippines	33–119	Chinese Taipei
Scoring by quarter: 9–37, 4–36, 14–24, 6–22
Pts: Ong 15; Rebs: Cancio 13; Asts: Parel, Buendia 1		Pts: Chen Y.H. 21; Rebs: Huang J.C. 7 Asts: Huang J.C. 7

Olympic Sports Center, Jinan
Referees: Carole Delaune (FRA), Kong Sin Mui (HKG), Lei Weng Tim (MAC)

December 5
15:00

Report

India	45–94	Japan
Scoring by quarter: 15–24, 10–16, 7–27, 13–27
Pts: Sonkar 15; Rebs: Limaye 9 Asts: Sonkar, Poojamol, Limaye 2		Pts: Mawuli 15; Rebs: Akaho 9 Asts: Miyazaki 5

Olympic Sports Center, Jinan
Referees: Carole Delaune (FRA), Dilshodbek Ubaydullaev (UZB), Kong Sin Mui (HKG)

December 5
17:00

Report

Philippines	29–144	China
Scoring by quarter: 8–32, 5–37, 7–37, 9–38
Pts: Vergara 12; Rebs: Ong, Cancio 3 Asts: Dawis 1		Pts: Wang Z. 25; Rebs: Huang S.J. 18; Asts: Li Y.Y. 6

Olympic Sports Center, Jinan
Referees: Lim Sok Hoon (MAS), Chao Hio Tong (MAC), Gihan Ethugalge (SRI)

December 5
19:00

Report

Chinese Taipei	77–98	South Korea
Scoring by quarter: 10–30, 15–15, 23–28, 29–25
Pts: Chen W.A. 22; Rebs: Han Y.E. 9 Asts: Huang J.C., Chen W.A. 4		Pts: Kim H.J. 20; Rebs: Lee M.J., Yang I.Y. 8 Asts: Lee M.J. 5

Olympic Sports Center, Jinan
Referees: Fabiana Nițu (ROU), Lei Weng Tim (MAC), Leong Chuen Wing (SIN)

December 6
15:00

Report

South Korea	86–44	Philippines
Scoring by quarter: 31–13, 21–11, 12–13, 22–7
Pts: Kim H.J. 13; Rebs: Lee L.N. 7 Asts: Shin J.H. 3		Pts: Ong 10; Rebs: Dawis 7 Asts: Dawis, Claro 2

Olympic Sports Center, Jinan
Referees: Tio Juun Hau (MAS), Gihan Ethugalge (SRI), Dilshodbek Ubaydullaev (UZB)

December 6
17:00

Report

China	125–49	India
Scoring by quarter: 39–17, 25–9, 25–16, 36–7
Pts: Gong L. 26; Rebs: Yang H.Y. 11; Asts: Cao J.W. 6		Pts: Sh. Kaur 17; Rebs: Sh. Kaur 4 Asts: Sonkar, Kumari, Akula 1

Olympic Sports Center, Jinan
Referees: Carole Delaune (FRA), Leong Chuen Wing (SIN), Chao Hio Tong (MAC)

December 6
19:00

Report

Japan	107–77	Chinese Taipei
Scoring by quarter: 31–17, 29–13, 26–31, 21–16
Pts: Yamada 23; Rebs: Mawuli 10; Asts: Mawuli, Yamada, Itani 4		Pts: Chen Y.H. 21; Rebs: Chen W.A. 8 Asts: Huang J.C. 3

Olympic Sports Center, Jinan
Referees: Fabiana Nițu (ROU), Karmen Tam (HKG), Tan Yee Nee (SIN)

December 7
15:00

Report

Chinese Taipei	99–67	India
Scoring by quarter: 25–22, 17–21, 32–18, 25–6
Pts: Chen Y.H. 30; Rebs: Han Y.E. 13; Asts: Chen Y.H., Huang J.C., Lin W.Y. 3		Pts: Poojamol 23; Rebs: Limaye 20; Asts: Sh. Kaur, Poojamol 2

Olympic Sports Center, Jinan
Referees: Carole Delaune (FRA), Lei Weng Tim (MAC), Gihan Ethugalge (SRI)

December 7
17:00

Report

South Korea	58–111	China
Scoring by quarter: 20–28, 15–26, 15–27, 8–30
Pts: Shin J.H. 21; Rebs: Yang I.Y. 7 Asts: Five players 1		Pts: Yang H.Y. 30; Rebs: Yang H.Y. 18; Asts: Gong L. 6

Olympic Sports Center, Jinan
Referees: Fabiana Nițu (ROU), Leong Chuen Wing (SIN), Lim Sok Hoon (MAS)

December 7
19:00

Report

Philippines	27–102	Japan
Scoring by quarter: 7–33, 9–27, 4–22, 7–20
Pts: Vergara 12; Rebs: Buendia 7 Asts: Dawis, Vergara, Parel 1		Pts: Yamada 16; Rebs: Tanaka 12; Asts: Hagio 3

Olympic Sports Center, Jinan
Referees: Tan Yee Nee (SIN), Kong Sin Mui (HKG), Tio Juun Hau (MAS)

December 8
15:00

Report

India	87–66	Philippines
Scoring by quarter: 21–13, 22–15, 26–8, 18–30
Pts: Limaye 20; Rebs: Hilarious 14; Asts: Hilarious 5		Pts: Ong 18; Rebs: Ong 9 Asts: Claro, Vergara 2

Olympic Sports Center, Jinan
Referees: Dilshodbek Ubaydullaev (UZB), Chao Hio Tong (MAC), Leong Chuen Wing (SIN)

December 8
17:00

Report

China	105–91	Chinese Taipei
Scoring by quarter: 32–16, 16–20, 28–18, 29–37
Pts: Hu Y.M. 22; Rebs: Gong L., Hu Y.M. 9 Asts: Yang L.W. 4		Pts: Lee C.Y., Han Y.E. 20; Rebs: Han Y.E. 8 Asts: Chen W.A. 4

Olympic Sports Center, Jinan
Referees: Carole Delaune (FRA), Tio Juun Hau (MAS), Karmen Tam (HKG)

December 8
19:00

Report

Japan	83–67	South Korea
Scoring by quarter: 21–18, 16–16, 15–17, 31–16
Pts: Yamada 21; Rebs: Nakamura 17; Asts: Miyazaki 2		Pts: Kim S.O. 19; Rebs: Yang I.Y. 12; Asts: Shin J.H., Yang I.Y. 2

Olympic Sports Center, Jinan
Referees: Fabiana Nițu (ROU), Tan Yee Nee (SIN), Lei Weng Tim (MAC)

=== Level II ===
Team	Pld	W	L	PF	PA	PD	Pts
Malaysia	5	5	0	313	227	+86	10
Hong Kong	5	4	1	340	219	+121	9
Singapore	5	3	2	311	291	+20	8
Sri Lanka	5	2	3	278	303	−25	7
Uzbekistan	5	1	4	253	345	−92	6
Macau	5	0	5	240	350	−110	5

December 4
9:00

Report

Singapore	44–73	Hong Kong
Scoring by quarter: 8–16, 12–18, 8–17, 16–22
Pts: Lim 11; Rebs: Imran 8 Asts: Chin W.Q. 2		Pts: Leung W. 21; Rebs: Cham W.P. 21; Asts: Ko Y.L., Leung W. 5

Olympic Sports Center, Jinan
Referees: Kim Bo-Hui (KOR), Aiko Takubo (JPN), Jiang Tongbiao (CHN)

December 4
13:00

Report

Sri Lanka	57–51	Macau
Scoring by quarter: 19–15, 14–14, 15–12, 9–10
Pts: Perera 28; Rebs: Fernando 10; Asts: Durage 2		Pts: Ng H.T. 15; Rebs: Cheang N.S. 13; Asts: Sun W.S. 2

Olympic Sports Center, Jinan
Referees: Naohiko Uchihara (JPN), Snehal Bendke (IND), Rafael Britanico (PHI)

December 4
19:00

Report

Malaysia	70–37	Uzbekistan
Scoring by quarter: 17–2, 24–11, 17–10, 12–14
Pts: Teo C.Y. 18; Rebs: Lam X.Y. 14; Asts: Lee P.J., Yap Y.X. 4		Pts: Asanova 15; Rebs: Asanova 20; Asts: Yuldasheva 3

Olympic Sports Center, Jinan
Referees: Liu Wei (CHN), Lee Ji-Youn (KOR), Tien Hsiao-lun (TPE)

December 5
9:00

Report

Macau	30–59	Malaysia
Scoring by quarter: 8–16, 8–15, 7–14, 7–14
Pts: Choi C.I. 9 Rebs: Ng H.T. 9 Asts: Cheang N.S. 3		Pts: M. Lee 17; Rebs: M. Lee 12; Asts: M. Lee, Teo C.Y., Choo X.Y. 2

Olympic Sports Center, Jinan
Referees: Tang Jun (CHN), Dominique Pomar (PHI), Chen Ming-ling (TPE)

December 5
11:00

Report

Hong Kong	64–36	Uzbekistan
Scoring by quarter: 15–3, 18–7, 18–9, 13–17
Pts: Leung W. 15; Rebs: Cham W.P. 9 Asts: Ko Y.L., Seung H.Y., Cheung W.S. 2		Pts: Kirienko, Asanova 8 Rebs: Asanova 23; Asts: Komarova 2

Olympic Sports Center, Jinan
Referees: Naohiko Uchihara (JPN), Kim Bo-Hui (KOR), Peter Sonthosh Divaker (IND)

December 5
13:00

Report

Sri Lanka	54–72	Singapore
Scoring by quarter: 15–12, 8–15, 14–21, 17–24
Pts: Durage 14; Rebs: Durage 11; Asts: Perera 2		Pts: Lim 22; Rebs: F. Chua 16; Asts: Lim 3

Olympic Sports Center, Jinan
Referees: Liang Bing (CHN), Tien Hsiao-lun (TPE), Snehal Bendke (IND)

December 6
9:00

Report

Uzbekistan	46–63	Sri Lanka
Scoring by quarter: 10–11, 14–12, 11–23, 11–17
Pts: Asanova 20; Rebs: Asanova 26; Asts: Klimashina, Komarova 3		Pts: Siriwardana 22; Rebs: Fernando 17; Asts: Durage 4

Olympic Sports Center, Jinan
Referees: Jiang Tongbiao (CHN), Peter Sonthosh Divaker (IND), Dominique Pomar (PHI)

December 6
11:00

Report

Singapore	74–55	Macau
Scoring by quarter: 17–11, 17–10, 27–11, 13–23
Pts: V. Chua 21; Rebs: Peng 7 Asts: Five players 2		Pts: Tong W.I. 17; Rebs: Lou M.I. 14; Asts: Choi C.I. 3

Olympic Sports Center, Jinan
Referees: Rafael Britanico (PHI), Liu Wei (CHN), Aiko Takubo (JPN)

December 6
13:00

Report

Malaysia	61–57	Hong Kong
Scoring by quarter: 11–15, 9–4, 23–17, 18–21
Pts: Teo C.Y. 18; Rebs: M. Lee 13; Asts: Lee P.J. 5		Pts: Ko Y.L. 17; Rebs: Cham W.P. 17; Asts: Leung W. 5

Olympic Sports Center, Jinan
Referees: Liang Bing (CHN), Chen Ming-ling (TPE), Lee Ji-Youn (KOR)

December 7
9:00

Report

Singapore	49–54	Malaysia
Scoring by quarter: 17–18, 12–15, 10–13, 10–8
Pts: V. Chua 13; Rebs: F. Chua, Peng 9 Asts: Seow, Lim 2		Pts: Choo X.Y. 16; Rebs: Choo X.Y. 14; Asts: M. Lee 3

Olympic Sports Center, Jinan
Referees: Tien Hsiao-lun (TPE), Rafael Britanico (PHI), Kim Bo-Hui (KOR)

December 7
11:00

Report

Macau	76–79	Uzbekistan
Scoring by quarter: 16–23, 21–14, 24–23, 15–19
Pts: Ng H.T. 25; Rebs: Lou M.I. 18; Asts: Cheang N.S. 6		Pts: Asanova 23; Rebs: Asanova 20; Asts: Kirienko 5

Olympic Sports Center, Jinan
Referees: Snehal Bendke (IND), Naohiko Uchihara (JPN), Liu Wei (CHN)

December 7
13:00

Report

Sri Lanka	50–65	Hong Kong
Scoring by quarter: 10–17, 8–17, 15–18, 17–13
Pts: Perera 23; Rebs: Fernando 13; Asts: Perera 2		Pts: Seung H.Y. 19; Rebs: Leung W. 12; Asts: Leung W. 6

Olympic Sports Center, Jinan
Referees: Dominique Pomar (PHI), Tang Jun (CHN), Aiko Takubo (JPN)

December 8
9:00

Report

Hong Kong	81–28	Macau
Scoring by quarter: 21–8, 18–8, 17–4, 25–8
Pts: Leung W. 15; Rebs: Leung W. 7 Asts: Leung W. 4		Pts: Choi C.I. 12; Rebs: Cheang N.S., Ng H.T. 8 Asts: Four players 1

Olympic Sports Center, Jinan
Referees: Peter Sonthosh Divaker (IND), Dominique Pomar (PHI), Aiko Takubo (JPN)

December 8
11:00

Report

Uzbekistan	55–72	Singapore
Scoring by quarter: 12–16, 17–23, 16–18, 10–15
Pts: Klimashina, Asanova 15; Rebs: Kirienko 15; Asts: Kirienko, Komarova 3		Pts: F. Chua 15; Rebs: F. Chua 10; Asts: Lim 3

Olympic Sports Center, Jinan
Referees: Lee Ji-Youn (KOR), Chen Ming-ling (TPE), Tang Jun (CHN)

December 8
13:00

Report

Malaysia	69–54	Sri Lanka
Scoring by quarter: 18–21, 20–14, 15–17, 16–2
Pts: M. Lee 20; Rebs: Choo X.Y. 10; Asts: M. Lee 2		Pts: Perera 23; Rebs: Durage 11; Asts: Durage 4

Olympic Sports Center, Jinan
Referees: Naohiko Uchihara (JPN), Jiang Tongbiao (CHN), Snehal Bendke (IND)

== Qualifying round ==
Winners are promoted to Level I for the 2013 championships.

December 10
13:00

Report

India	81–51	Hong Kong
Scoring by quarter: 21–12, 19–13, 22–10, 19–16
Pts: Sh. Kaur, Limaye 15; Rebs: Limaye 18; Asts: Akula 8		Pts: Leung W. 18; Rebs: Cham W.P. 12; Asts: Tse Y.L. 2

Olympic Sports Center, Jinan
Referees: Dominique Pomar (PHI), Liang Bing (CHN), Lee Ji-Youn (KOR)

December 10
15:00

Report

Philippines	55–66	Malaysia
Scoring by quarter: 13–23, 13–18, 9–14, 20–11
Pts: Ong 26; Rebs: Parel 8 Asts: Claro, Vergara 4		Pts: Choo X.Y. 13; Rebs: Choo X.Y. 16; Asts: Lee P.J. 4

Olympic Sports Center, Jinan
Referees: Kim Bo-Hui (KOR), Chen Ming-ling (TPE), Naohiko Uchihara (JPN)

== Final round ==
Semifinals
December 10
China	78
South Korea	79
December 10
Japan	84
Chinese Taipei	55

Final
December 11
South Korea	56
Japan	102
3rd place
December 11
China	105
Chinese Taipei	69

=== Semifinals ===
December 10
17:00

Report

China	78–79	South Korea
Scoring by quarter: 23–22, 12–28, 20–10, 23–19
Pts: Gong L., Zhang Z.T. 19; Rebs: Gong L. 11; Asts: Yang L.W. 4		Pts: Kim S.O. 28; Rebs: Kim S.O. 7 Asts: Shin J.H. 3

Olympic Sports Center, Jinan
Referees: Fabiana Nițu (ROU), Leong Chuen Wing (SIN), Lim Sok Hoon (MAS)

December 10
19:00

Report

Japan	84–55	Chinese Taipei
Scoring by quarter: 24–15, 19–14, 18–16, 23–10
Pts: Yamada 22; Rebs: Nakamura 11; Asts: Nagai 4		Pts: Han Y.E. 14; Rebs: Lin W.Y. 17; Asts: Chen W.A. 3

Olympic Sports Center, Jinan
Referees: Carole Delaune (FRA), Snehal Bendke (IND), Rafael Britanico (PHI)

=== 3rd place ===
December 11
15:00

Report

China	105–69	Chinese Taipei
Scoring by quarter: 29–14, 23–18, 26–20, 27–17
Pts: Yang L.W. 20; Rebs: Gong L., Hu Y.M., Yang H.Y. 12; Asts: Yang L.W. 5		Pts: Chen W.A. 19; Rebs: Chen W.A. 8 Asts: Huang J.C. 3

Olympic Sports Center, Jinan
Referees: Carole Delaune (FRA), Tan Yee Nee (SIN), Kim Bo-Hui (KOR)

=== Final ===
December 11
17:00

Report

South Korea	56–102	Japan
Scoring by quarter: 14–23, 11–24, 18–28, 13–27
Pts: Lee L.N. 12; Rebs: Lee L.N. 11; Asts: Kim H.J. 3		Pts: Mawuli 19; Rebs: Nakamura 14; Asts: Miyazaki 4

Olympic Sports Center, Jinan
Referees: Fabiana Nițu (ROU), Snehal Bendke (IND), Tien Hsiao-lun (TPE)

== Final standing ==
Qualified for the 2012 FIBA Under-17 World Championship for Women

Rank	Team	Record
1st place, gold medalist(s)	Japan	7–0
2nd place, silver medalist(s)	South Korea	4–3
3rd place, bronze medalist(s)	China	5–2
4	Chinese Taipei	2–5
5	India	2–4
6	Philippines	0–6
7	Malaysia	6–0
8	Hong Kong	4–2
9	Singapore	3–2
10	Sri Lanka	2–3
11	Uzbekistan	1–4
12	Macau	0–5

== Awards ==
2011 Asian Under-16 champions

Japan
First title
