= 2017 FIBA U16 Asian Championship =

International men's youth basketball championship

5th FIBA Under-16 Asian Basketball Championship

Tournament details
- Host country: China
- City: Foshan
- Dates: 2–8 April 2018
- Teams: 13 (from 1 confederation)
- Venue: 1 (in 1 host city)

Final positions
- Champions: Australia (1st title)
- Runners-up: China
- Third place: New Zealand

Tournament statistics
- Top scorer: (Iran) Matin Aghajanpour (23.2 points per game)

Official website
- www.fiba.basketball/history

The 2017 FIBA U16 Asian Championship (also known as the 2018 FIBA U16 Asian Championship) was the qualifying tournament for FIBA Asia at the 2018 FIBA Under-17 Basketball World Cup. The tournament was held in Foshan, China from 2 to 8 April 2018. The competition was scheduled to be played in Dalang, China from 26 March to 1 April 2018. The top four teams would represent FIBA Asia to the 2018 FIBA U17 Basketball World Cup.

== Qualification ==
=== Allocation of berths ===
According to FIBA Asia rules, the number of participating teams in the FIBA U16 Asian Championship was set at 16. The hosts and the defending champions qualified automatically. All FIBA Asia subzones got two berths each, except for the Central and South Asian subzones, which got one berth each. FIBA Oceania got two berths. The last two berths were allocated to subzones based on their teams' results in the 2015 FIBA Asia Under-16 Championship.

Allocation of berths
Subzone	Automatic qualifiers		Default berths	Additional berths as best Asian teams from last championship	Total
Subzone	Hosts	Defending champions	Default berths	Additional berths as best Asian teams from last championship	Total
Central Asia	0	0	1	0	1
East Asia	1	1	2	2	6
Gulf	0	0	2	0	2
South Asia	0	0	1	0	1
Southeast Asia	0	0	2	0	2
West Asia	0	0	2	0	2
FIBA Oceania	0	—	2	—	2
Total	1	1	12	2	16

=== Qualified teams ===
Initially, 16 teams were named as qualified to compete, but according to the tournament's official website, there were only 13 teams left to participate.

- Central Asia (1)
  - ~~Kazakhstan~~ (withdrew)
- East Asia (6)
  - China (hosts)
  - South Korea (defending champions)
  - Chinese Taipei
  - Hong Kong
  - Japan
  - Macau
- Gulf (2)
  - ~~Bahrain~~ (withdrew)
  - ~~Saudi Arabia~~ (withdrew)
- South Asia (1)
  - India
- Southeast Asia (2)
  - Malaysia
  - Philippines
- West Asia (2)
  - Iran
  - Lebanon
- FIBA Oceania (2)
  - Australia
  - New Zealand

== Format ==
This edition of the tournament will be having a different format as compared to what was used since 2009. While there would still be a preliminary round robin of four groups of four teams, the single-elimination final round immediately follows the preliminary round. In the final round, the teams that finished second and third in their respective groups would play in the qualifications to quarterfinals of the final round, while the group winners automatically qualify to the quarterfinals proper.

== Draw ==
The official draw was held on 6 March 2017 in Beijing.

== Preliminary round ==
All times are local (UTC+8).

=== Group A ===
Pos	Team	Pld	W	L	PF	PA	PD	Pts	Qualification
1	China	2	2	0	207	93	+114	4	Quarterfinals
2	New Zealand	2	1	1	171	144	+27	3	Playoffs
3	Hong Kong	2	0	2	107	248	−141	2	Playoffs

Source: FIBA Asia
Rules for classification: 1) Points; 2) Head-to-head results; 3) Points difference; 4) Points scored.

2 April 2018
11:00

Report

New Zealand	124–61	Hong Kong
Scoring by quarter: 23–11, 39–15, 28–16, 34–19
Pts: Dance 18; Rebs: Trott 8 Asts: Lepou 4		Pts: Siu W.Y. 13; Rebs: Lung T.K., Lam 5 Asts: Lung T.K. 3

Foshan Lingnan Mingzhu Gymnasium, Foshan
Referees: Mohammad Doost (IRN), Kihamu Matsumoto (JPN), Kim Cheong-Soo (KOR)

3 April 2018
15:00

Report

Hong Kong	46–124	China
Scoring by quarter: 7–28, 19–33, 8–31, 12–32
Pts: Lam 12; Rebs: Siu W.Y. 6 Asts: Lung T.K. 3		Pts: Li J.H. 17; Rebs: Yang, Aizimaiti 10; Asts: 5 players 4

Foshan Lingnan Mingzhu Gymnasium, Foshan
Referees: Mohsen Roshan Zamir (IRN), Kihamu Matsumoto (JPN), Kim Cheong-Soo (KOR)

4 April 2018
18:00

Report

China	83–47	New Zealand
Scoring by quarter: 21–10, 23–11, 19–15, 20–11
Pts: Sun H.Q. 29; Rebs: Aizimaiti 9 Asts: Lu P.Y. 4		Pts: Dance 14; Rebs: Dance 8 Asts: Williams-Dunn 2

Foshan Lingnan Mingzhu Gymnasium, Foshan
Referees: Ferdinand Pascual (PHI), Kim Cheong-Soo (KOR), Lee Kyoung-hwan (KOR)

=== Group B ===
Pos	Team	Pld	W	L	PF	PA	PD	Pts	Qualification
1	Australia	2	2	0	192	99	+93	4	Quarterfinals
2	Philippines	2	1	1	114	139	−25	3	Playoffs
3	Malaysia	2	0	2	104	172	−68	2	Playoffs

Source: FIBA Asia
Rules for classification: 1) Points; 2) Head-to-head results; 3) Points difference; 4) Points scored.

2 April 2018
13:00

Report

Philippines	62–57	Malaysia
Scoring by quarter: 11–13, 19–14, 19–13, 13–17
Pts: Sotto 14; Rebs: Sotto 16; Asts: Padrigao 5		Pts: Tang 17; Rebs: Teoh Y.K., Tan E.W. 9 Asts: Teoh Y.K. 5

Foshan Lingnan Mingzhu Gymnasium, Foshan
Referees: Lee Kyoung-hwan (KOR), Mohsen Roshan Zamir (IRN), Ryoko Odanaka (JPN)

3 April 2018
13:00

Report

Malaysia	47–110	Australia
Scoring by quarter: 12–37, 19–20, 9–28, 7–25
Pts: Tang 10; Rebs: Tan C.W. 5 Asts: Teoh W.H. 2		Pts: Rantall 21; Rebs: Jackson 10; Asts: Wigness, Travers 4

Foshan Lingnan Mingzhu Gymnasium, Foshan
Referees: Lee Kyoung-hwan (KOR), Huang Chen-yu (TPE), Biswajit Ojha (IND)

4 April 2018
11:00

Report

Australia	82–52	Philippines
Scoring by quarter: 18–13, 20–12, 24–15, 20–12
Pts: Rantall 15; Rebs: Jackson 10; Asts: Wigness, Capetola 4		Pts: Guadaña 11; Rebs: Andrada 5 Asts: Fortea, Padrigao 3

Foshan Lingnan Mingzhu Gymnasium, Foshan
Referees: Mohammad Doost (IRN), Mohsen Roshan Zamir (IRN), Ryoko Odanaka (JPN)

=== Group C ===
Pos	Team	Pld	W	L	PF	PA	PD	Pts	Qualification
1	Iran	2	2	0	241	129	+112	4	Quarterfinals
2	Chinese Taipei	2	1	1	206	140	+66	3	Playoffs
3	Macau	2	0	2	92	270	−178	2	Playoffs

Source: FIBA Asia
Rules for classification: 1) Points; 2) Head-to-head results; 3) Points difference; 4) Points scored.

2 April 2018
15:00

Report

Chinese Taipei	122–47	Macau
Scoring by quarter: 22–4, 24–11, 37–19, 39–13
Pts: L. Lin 28; Rebs: Lin Y.C. 10; Asts: Chen L.S., Ma C.H. 4		Pts: Liang 12; Rebs: Liang 8 Asts: Sou C.W. 2

Foshan Lingnan Mingzhu Gymnasium, Foshan
Referees: Dallas Christian Pickering (NZL), Ricor Buaron (PHI), Martin Davison (NZL)

3 April 2018
11:00

Report

Macau	45–148	Iran
Scoring by quarter: 9–31, 10–44, 16–39, 10–34
Pts: Navalta 12; Rebs: Chan S.W. 7 Asts: Navalta, Lei K.W. 1		Pts: Aghajanpour 27; Rebs: Agha Miri 10; Asts: Derakhshi 5

Foshan Lingnan Mingzhu Gymnasium, Foshan
Referees: Ferdinand Pascual (PHI), Dallas Christian Pickering (NZL), Martin Davison (NZL)

4 April 2018
13:00

Report

Iran	93–84	Chinese Taipei
Scoring by quarter: 21–28, 29–19, 21–23, 22–14
Pts: Aghajanpour 39; Rebs: Aliyaridehkordi 13; Asts: Vahedi 5		Pts: Chen C.S. 20; Rebs: Chen C.S. 15; Asts: L. Lin 3

Foshan Lingnan Mingzhu Gymnasium, Foshan
Referees: Dallas Christian Pickering (NZL), Kihamu Matsumoto (JPN), Martin Davison (NZL)

=== Group D ===
Pos	Team	Pld	W	L	PF	PA	PD	Pts	Qualification
1	Japan	3	3	0	279	198	+81	6	Quarterfinals
2	South Korea	3	2	1	289	241	+48	5	Playoffs
3	Lebanon	3	1	2	250	299	−49	4	Playoffs
4	India	3	0	3	209	289	−80	3	Eliminated

Source: FIBA Asia
Rules for classification: 1) Points; 2) Head-to-head results; 3) Points difference; 4) Points scored.

2 April 2018
18:00

Report

Japan	94–68	Lebanon
Scoring by quarter: 26–19, 20–14, 29–13, 19–22
Pts: Tominaga 15; Rebs: Yamazaki 13; Asts: Kawamura 5		Pts: R. Zanbaka 21; Rebs: R. Zanbaka 12; Asts: Labaki, Khayat 2

Foshan Lingnan Mingzhu Gymnasium, Foshan
Referees: Ferdinand Pascual (PHI), Andy Cheung (HKG), He Luwei (CHN)

2 April 2018
20:00

Report

India	71–92	South Korea
Scoring by quarter: 12–27, 18–18, 20–20, 21–27
Pts: Singh 28; Rebs: Singh 17; Asts: Prince George 2		Pts: Kim J.H. 19; Rebs: Yang J.S., Moon J.H., Cha M.S. 6 Asts: Yang J.S. 10

Foshan Lingnan Mingzhu Gymnasium, Foshan
Referees: Gao Xin (CHN), Yuan Ningpeng (CHN), Chan Ho Ming (HKG)

3 April 2018
18:00

Report

Japan	109–57	India
Scoring by quarter: 17–17, 36–12, 34–14, 22–14
Pts: Tominaga 27; Rebs: Kawamura, Mitani 5 Asts: Kawamura 7		Pts: Singh 26; Rebs: Singh 13; Asts: Bhati, P. Tomar 2

Foshan Lingnan Mingzhu Gymnasium, Foshan
Referees: Andy Cheung (HKG), He Luwei (CHN), Gao Xin (CHN)

3 April 2018
20:00

Report

Lebanon	94–124	South Korea
Scoring by quarter: 14–36, 18–31, 25–28, 37–29
Pts: R. Zanbaka 30; Rebs: R. Zanbaka 7 Asts: Khoueiry, A. Zanbaka 2		Pts: Lee S.W. 27; Rebs: Cha M.S. 9 Asts: Yang J.S. 6

Foshan Lingnan Mingzhu Gymnasium, Foshan
Referees: Ricor Buaron (PHI), Yuan Ningpeng (CHN), Chan Ho Ming (HKG)

4 April 2018
15:00

Report

India	81–88	Lebanon
Scoring by quarter: 22–24, 17–30, 25–15, 17–19
Pts: Bhati 22; Rebs: H. Tomar 11; Asts: Beniwal 3		Pts: R. Zanbaka 27; Rebs: Khayat 2 Asts: R. Zanbaka, Khayat 4

Foshan Lingnan Mingzhu Gymnasium, Foshan
Referees: Andy Cheung (HKG), Gao Xin (CHN), Yuan Ningpeng (CHN)

4 April 2018
20:00

Report

South Korea	73–76	Japan
Scoring by quarter: 8–16, 19–12, 26–24, 20–24
Pts: Moon J.H. 17; Rebs: Moon J.H. 15; Asts: Yang J.S. 3		Pts: Tanaka 17; Rebs: Yokochi 9 Asts: Kawamura 4

Foshan Lingnan Mingzhu Gymnasium, Foshan
Referees: Ricor Buaron (PHI), He Luwei (CHN), Chan Ho Ming (HKG)

== Final round ==
=== Bracket ===
Playoffs
Chinese Taipei	78
Lebanon	82
Philippines	103
Hong Kong	61
South Korea	116
Macau	43
New Zealand	79
Malaysia	42

Quarterfinals
China	80
Lebanon	71
Japan	70
Philippines	72
Australia	69
South Korea	60
Iran	69
New Zealand	73

Semifinals
China	60
Philippines	54
Australia	86
New Zealand	61

Gold Medal Game
China	67
Australia	91
Bronze Medal Game
Philippines	60
New Zealand	76

Classification 5th–8th

Classification Semifinals
Lebanon	79
Japan	88
South Korea	90
Iran	84

Fifth Place Game
Japan	63
South Korea	75
Seventh Place Game
Lebanon	82
Iran	95

=== Playoffs ===
5 April 2018
13:00

Report

Philippines	103–61	Hong Kong
Scoring by quarter: 31–18, 28–18, 27–16, 17–9
Pts: Calimag, Balaga 12; Rebs: Sotto 12; Asts: Padrigao 6		Pts: Lung T.K. 18; Rebs: Siu W.Y. 5 Asts: 6 players 1

Foshan Lingnan Mingzhu Gymnasium, Foshan
Referees: Kihamu Matsumoto (JPN), Kim Cheong-Soo (KOR), Lee Kyoung-Hwan (KOR)

5 April 2018
15:00

Report

Chinese Taipei	78–82	Lebanon
Scoring by quarter: 24–21, 21–23, 12–22, 21–16
Pts: Chen C.S., Chang A.C. 13; Rebs: Chen K.C., Lin Y.C. 9 Asts: Chen C.S. 3		Pts: El Awar, Tannoury, A. Zanbaka 13; Rebs: Tannoury 15; Asts: Khayat 4

Foshan Lingnan Mingzhu Gymnasium, Foshan
Referees: Ferdinand Pascual (PHI), Dallas Christian Pickering (NZL), Ricor Buaron (PHI)

5 April 2018
18:00

Report

New Zealand	79–42	Malaysia
Scoring by quarter: 17–8, 18–12, 13–10, 31–14
Pts: Dance, Broughton 13; Rebs: Cowie 8 Asts: Payne 4		Pts: Tang 17; Rebs: Lee J.H. 6 Asts: W. Lee 3

Foshan Lingnan Mingzhu Gymnasium, Foshan
Referees: Mohammad Doost (IRN), Huang Chen-yu (TPE), Biswajit Ojha (IND)

5 April 2018
20:00

Report

South Korea	116–43	Macau
Scoring by quarter: 27–14, 20–11, 33–8, 36–10
Pts: Kim J.W. 24; Rebs: Park J.H. 10; Asts: Lee S.W. 6		Pts: Navalta 20; Rebs: Liang 13; Asts: Chan S.W., Liang 2

Foshan Lingnan Mingzhu Gymnasium, Foshan
Referees: Martin Davison (NZL), Andy Cheung (HKG), Chan Ho Ming (HKG)

=== Quarterfinals ===
6 April 2018
11:00

Report

Iran	69–73	New Zealand
Scoring by quarter: 20–16, 16–17, 13–21, 20–19
Pts: Aghajanpour, Yazarloo 14; Rebs: Agha Miri 11; Asts: Bahram Zad 6		Pts: Dance 22; Rebs: Dance 10; Asts: Cowie 5

Foshan Lingnan Mingzhu Gymnasium, Foshan
Referees: Ferdinand Pascual (PHI), He Luwei (CHN), Kihamu Matsumoto (JPN)

6 April 2018
13:00

Report

Australia	69–60	South Korea
Scoring by quarter: 13–12, 7–16, 13–10, 36–22
Pts: Swaka Lo Buluk 15; Rebs: Jackson, Williamson 17; Asts: Capetola, Jackson 4		Pts: Moon J.H. 24; Rebs: Moon J.H. 10; Asts: Park M.B. 3

Foshan Lingnan Mingzhu Gymnasium, Foshan
Referees: Ricor Buaron (PHI), Andy Cheung (HKG), Yuan Ningpeng (CHN)

6 April 2018
15:00

Report

Japan	70–72	Philippines
Scoring by quarter: 17–15, 17–17, 12–25, 24–15
Pts: Tanaka 17; Rebs: Mitani 8 Asts: Nakamura 5		Pts: Sotto 28; Rebs: Sotto 21; Asts: Fortea 4

Foshan Lingnan Mingzhu Gymnasium, Foshan
Referees: Mohammad Doost (IRN), Lee Kyoung-hwan (KOR), Martin Davison (NZL)

6 April 2018
18:00

Report

China	80–71	Lebanon
Scoring by quarter: 23–22, 15–17, 27–17, 15–15
Pts: Sun H.Q. 23; Rebs: Jiao B.Q. 14; Asts: Chen P.Y. 4		Pts: R. Zanbaka 20; Rebs: R. Zanbaka 9 Asts: R. Zanbaka 3

Foshan Lingnan Mingzhu Gymnasium, Foshan
Referees: Dallas Christian Pickering (NZL), Mohsen Roshan Zamir (IRN), Kim Cheong-Soo (KOR)

=== 5–8th place semifinals ===
7 April 2018
11:00

Report

Lebanon	79–88	Japan
Scoring by quarter: 15–18, 16–21, 20–30, 28–19
Pts: Saad 18; Rebs: Saad 10; Asts: Labaki 4		Pts: Tominaga 24; Rebs: Yuki 6 Asts: Yokoshi 9

Foshan Lingnan Mingzhu Gymnasium, Foshan
Referees: Ferdinand Pascual (PHI), Dallas Christian Pickering (NZL), He Luwei (CHN)

7 April 2018
13:00

Report

South Korea	90–84	Iran
Scoring by quarter: 19–15, 19–25, 29–21, 23–23
Pts: Kim J.H. 16; Rebs: Lee S.W. 7 Asts: Kim D.E., Lee S.W. 5		Pts: Aghajanpour, Bahram Zad, Derakhshi 14; Rebs: Aghajanpour, Derakhshi 8 Asts: Derakhshi 6

Foshan Lingnan Mingzhu Gymnasium, Foshan
Referees: Ricor Buaron (PHI), Yuan Ningpeng (CHN), Martin Davison (NZL)

=== Semifinals ===
7 April 2018
15:00

Report

Australia	86–61	New Zealand
Scoring by quarter: 25–21, 22–15, 15–16, 24–9
Pts: Wigness 24; Rebs: Jackson, Travers 6 Asts: Travers 8		Pts: Broughton 14; Rebs: Dance 6 Asts: Broughton 3

Foshan Lingnan Mingzhu Gymnasium, Foshan
Referees: Mohammad Doost (IRN), Mohsen Roshan Zamir (IRN), Kim Cheong-Soo (KOR)

7 April 2018
18:00

Report

China	60–54	Philippines
Scoring by quarter: 16–15, 16–14, 16–7, 12–18
Pts: Sun H.Q. 22; Rebs: Lu P.Y 11; Asts: Chen P.Y. 6		Pts: Sotto 26; Rebs: Sotto 21; Asts: Padrigao 7

Foshan Lingnan Mingzhu Gymnasium, Foshan
Referees: Lee Kyoung-hwan (KOR), Kihamu Matsumoto (JPN), Ryoko Odanaka (JPN)

=== Seventh place game ===
8 April 2018
11:00

Report

Lebanon	82–95	Iran
Scoring by quarter: 21–19, 18–30, 21–26, 22–20
Pts: R. Zanbaka 21; Rebs: Khayat, R. Zanbaka 5 Asts: Khoueiry 4		Pts: Aghamiri 27; Rebs: Aghajanpour 13; Asts: Vahedi 10

Foshan Lingnan Mingzhu Gymnasium, Foshan
Referees: He Luwei (CHN), Chan Ho Ming (HKG), Martin Davison (NZL)

=== Fifth place game ===
8 April 2018
13:00

Report

Japan	63–75	South Korea
Scoring by quarter: 13–13, 14–19, 15–27, 21–16
Pts: Tominaga 18; Rebs: Tanaka 8 Asts: Nakamura 3		Pts: Moon J.H. 25; Rebs: Moon J.H. 14; Asts: Yang J.S. 9

Foshan Lingnan Mingzhu Gymnasium, Foshan
Referees: Mohammad Doost (IRN), Ricor Buaron (PHI), Huang Chen-yu (TPE)

=== Third place game ===
8 April 2018
15:00

Report

Philippines	60–76	New Zealand
Scoring by quarter: 14–18, 7–24, 20–19, 19–15
Pts: Fortea 18; Rebs: Sotto 7 Asts: Fortea 3		Pts: Williams-Dunn 17; Rebs: Broughton 8 Asts: Cowie 5

Foshan Lingnan Mingzhu Gymnasium, Foshan
Referees: Kihamu Matsumoto (JPN), Kim Cheong-Soo (KOR), Yuan Ningpeng (CHN)

=== Final ===
8 April 2018
18:00

Report

China	67–91	Australia
Scoring by quarter: 23–17, 11–21, 19–26, 14–27
Pts: Sun H.Q. 16; Rebs: Jiao B.Q. 5 Asts: Lu P.Y. 5		Pts: Travers 22; Rebs: Jackson 11; Asts: Wigness 7

Foshan Lingnan Mingzhu Gymnasium, Foshan
Referees: Ferdinand Pascual (PHI), Dallas Christian Pickering (NZL), Lee Kyoung-hwan (KOR)

== Final standing ==
Qualified for 2018 FIBA Under-17 Basketball World Cup

Rank	Team	Record
1st place, gold medalist(s)	Australia	5–0
2nd place, silver medalist(s)	China	4–1
3rd place, bronze medalist(s)	New Zealand	4–2
4	Philippines	3–3
5	South Korea	5–2
6	Japan	4–2
7	Iran	3–2
8	Lebanon	2–5
9	Chinese Taipei	1–2
10	Malaysia	0–3
11	Hong Kong	0–3
12	Macau	0–3
13	India	0–3

== Statistics ==
=== Player tournament averages ===
Points
#	Player	Pld	Pts	PPG
1	(Iran) Matin Aghajanpour	5	116	23.2
2	(China) Haoqin Sun	5	103	20.6
3	(Lebanon) Rayan Zaine Zanbaka	7	141	20.1
4	(Japan) Keisei Tominaga	6	105	17.5
5	(Philippines) Kai Zachary Sotto	6	101	16.8

Rebounds
#	Player	Pld	Rebs	RPG
1	(Philippines) Kai Zachary Sotto	6	81	13.5
2	(Australia) Luke Jackson	5	54	10.8
3	(South Korea) Jeonghyeon Moon	7	62	8.9
4	(Iran) Matin Aghajanpour	5	42	8.4
5	(South Korea) Minseok Cha	7	56	8.0

Assists
#	Player	Pld	Asts	APG
1	(South Korea) Yang Jun-seok	7	38	5.4
2	(Iran) Sina Vahedi	5	26	5.2
3	(Japan) Yuki Kawamura	6	26	4.3
4	(Philippines) Rence Keith Sean Padrigao	6	25	4.2
5	(Australia) Tamuri Wigness	5	19	3.8

Blocks
#	Player	Pld	Blocks	BPG
1	(Philippines) Kai Zachary Sotto	6	15	2.5
2	(Australia) Luke Travers	5	8	1.6
3	(Australia) Kobe Williamson	5	6	1.2
3	(Japan) Seishin Yokochi	6	7	1.2
5	(Philippines) Joshua Rafael Lazaro	6	6	1.0

Steals
#	Player	Pld	Stls	SPG
1	(Iran) Mohammadreza Derakhshi	4	13	3.3
2	(Australia) Tamuri Wigness	5	15	3.0
3	(Iran) Sina Vahedi	5	14	2.8
4	(Iran) Hamidreza Bahram Zad	5	13	2.6
4	(China) Haoqin Sun	5	13	2.6

Minutes
#	Player	Pld	Mins	MPG
1	(China) Pengyu Lu	5	162	32.5
1	(China) Haoqin Sun	5	162	32.5
3	(Lebanon) Rayan Zaine Zanbaka	7	221	31.7
4	(Iran) Sina Vahedi	6	156	31.5
5	(Iran) Matin Aghajanpour	6	154	31.4

Top Performers
#	Player	Pld	MPG	PPG	RPG	APG	SPG	BPG	FT	FT%	FG	FG%	DblDbl	DD%	Efficiency	EffPG
1	(Philippines) Kai Zachary Sotto	6	25.4	16.8	13.5	1.2	0.2	2.5	37/58	63.8	32/78	41.0	4	66.7	129	21.5
2	(Iran) Matin Aghajanpour	5	31.3	23.2	8.4	1.4	1.0	0.6	18/24	75.0	43/98	43.9	2	40.0	102	20.4
3	(Australia) Luke Jackson	5	28.1	8.8	10.8	1.6	2.0	0.4	0/3	0.0	22/44	50.0	1	20.0	97	19.4
3	(Australia) Luke Travers	5	25.1	11.2	7.4	3.6	2.0	1.6	5/6	83.3	23/41	56.1	0	0.0	97	19.4
5	(South Korea) Jeonghyeon Moon	7	27.3	15.9	8.9	1.3	0.6	0.3	20/34	58.8	44/76	57.9	3	42.9	124	17.7

=== Team tournament averages ===
Points
#	Team	Pld	Pts	PPG
1	Iran	5	489	97.8
2	South Korea	7	630	90.0
3	Australia	5	438	87.6

Field Goal Shooting
#	Team	Pld	FG	FG%
1	Australia	5	169/363	46.6
2	Iran	5	184/409	45.0
3	New Zealand	6	166/371	44.7

Rebounds
#	Team	Pld	Rebs	RPG
1	Philippines	6	326	54.3
2	Iran	5	262	52.4
3	China	5	248	49.6

Assists
#	Team	Pld	Asts	APG
1	South Korea	7	127	18.1
2	Australia	5	90	18.0
3	Iran	5	88	17.6

Blocks
#	Team	Pld	Blocks	BPG
1	Philippines	6	34	5.7
2	Australia	5	25	5.0
3	Iran	5	18	3.6

Steals
#	Team	Pld	Stls	SPG
1	Iran	5	83	16.6
2	Australia	5	64	12.8
3	South Korea	7	88	12.6

=== Tournament game highs ===
Statistic	Player	Total	Opponent (Date)	Team Statistic	Team	Total	Opponent (Date)
Points	(Iran) Matin Aghajanpour	39	Chinese Taipei (4 Apr)	Team; Points	Iran	129	Macau (3 Apr)
Offensive; Rebounds	(Australia) Luke Jackson	11	South Korea (6 Apr)	Offensive; Rebounds	China; Chinese Taipei	31; 31	Hong Kong (3 Apr); Macau (2 Apr)
Defensive; Rebounds	(Philippines) Kai Zachary Sotto (Philippines) Kai Zachary Sotto	13; 13	Malaysia (2 Apr); Japan (6 Apr)	Defensive; Rebounds	Philippines	55	Malaysia (2 Apr)
Rebounds	(Philippines) Kai Zachary Sotto (Philippines) Kai Zachary Sotto	21; 21	Japan (6 Apr); China (7 Apr)	Team; Rebounds	Philippines	79	Malaysia (2 Apr)
Assists	(Iran) Sina Vahedi (South Korea) Yang Jun-seok	10; 10	Lebanon (8 Apr); India (2 Apr)	Team; Assists	South Korea	35	Macau (5 Apr)
Steals	(Lebanon) Rayan Zaine Zanbaka	7	India (4 Apr)	Team; Steals	Iran	35	Macau (3 Apr)
Blocks	(Philippines) Kai Zachary Sotto	6	China (7 Apr)	Team; Blocks	Philippines	11	China (7 Apr)

== Awards ==
2017 Asian Under-16 champions

Australia
First title

=== All-Tournament Team ===
- C (Philippines) Kai Zachary Sotto
- F (Australia) Luke Jackson
- F (Australia) Wani Swaka Lo Buluk
- G (China) Sun Haoqin
- G (Australia) Tamuri Wigness

== Referees ==
The following referees were selected for the tournament.

- (China) Gao Xin
- (China) He Luwei
- (China) Yuan Ningpeng
- (Hong Kong) Chan Ho Ming
- (Hong Kong) Cheung Kwok Shun Andy
- (India) Biswajit Ojha
- (Iran) Mohammad Doost
- (Iran) Mohsen Roshan Zamir
- (Japan) Kihamu Matsumoto
- (Japan) Ryoko Odanaka
- (South Korea) Kim Cheong-soo
- (South Korea) Lee Kyoung-hwan
- (Malaysia) Chu Wei Chuen
- (New Zealand) Martin Davison
- (New Zealand) Dallas Christian Pickering
- (Philippines) Ricor Buaron
- (Philippines) Ferdinand Pascual
- (Chinese Taipei) Huang Chen-yu
