= Papua New Guinea men's national under-15 basketball team =

Papua New Guinea
- FIBA zone: FIBA Oceania
- National federation: Basketball Federation of Papua New Guinea

U17 World Cup
- Appearances: None

U16 Asia Cup
- Appearances: None

U15 Oceania Cup
- Appearances: 2
- Medals: None

The Papua New Guinea men's national under-15 basketball team is a national basketball team of Papua New Guinea, administered by the Basketball Federation of Papua New Guinea. It represents the entire country in international under-15 men's basketball competitions.

== FIBA U15 Oceania Cup participations ==
Year	Result
2018	6th
2022	6th

== See also ==
- Papua New Guinea men's national basketball team
- Papua New Guinea men's national under-18 basketball team
- Papua New Guinea women's national under-15 basketball team
