= New Zealand women's national under-17 basketball team =

Basketball team

New Zealand
- Joined FIBA: 1951
- FIBA zone: FIBA Asia
- National federation: Basketball New Zealand
- Coach: Liam Connelly

U17 World Cup
- Appearances: 4

U16 Asia Cup
- Appearances: 3
- Medals: (bronze) Bronze: (2023)

U15/U16 Oceania Cup
- Appearances: 7
- Medals: (silver) Silver: (2009, 2011, 2013, 2015, 2018, 2022, 2024)

First international
- Australia 84–48 New Zealand; 2009 FIBA Oceania U16 Championship (Brisbane, Australia; 20 August 2009)
Medal record
U15/U16 Oceania Cup
Silver medal – second place	2009 Brisbane
Silver medal – second place	2011 Canberra
Silver medal – second place	2013 Melbourne
Silver medal – second place	2015 Rotorua/Tauranga
Silver medal – second place	2018 Port Moresby
Silver medal – second place	2022 Mangilao
Silver medal – second place	2024 Canberra
U16 Asia Cup
Bronze medal – third place	2023 Amman

The New Zealand women's national under-15, under-16 and under-17 basketball team is the girls' national basketball team of New Zealand, governed by Basketball New Zealand. It represents the country in international under-15, under-16 and under-17 women's basketball competitions.

== Tournament record ==
=== U17 World Cup ===
Year	Pos.	Pld	W	L
(France) 2010	Did not qualify			
(Netherlands) 2012	Did not qualify			
(Czech Republic) 2014	Did not qualify			
(Spain) 2016	Did not qualify			
(Belarus) 2018	12th	7	1	6
(Hungary) 2022	12th	7	2	5
(Mexico) 2024	12th	7	3	4
(Czech Republic) 2026	5th	7	5	2
(Indonesia) 2028	To be determined			
Total	4/9	28	11	17

=== U16 Asia Cup ===
Year	Result
2017	4th
2022	4th
2023	3rd place, bronze medalist(s)

=== U15/U16 Oceania Cup ===
Year	Result
2009	2nd place, silver medalist(s)
2011	2nd place, silver medalist(s)
2013	2nd place, silver medalist(s)
2015	2nd place, silver medalist(s)
2018	2nd place, silver medalist(s)
2022	2nd place, silver medalist(s)
2024	2nd place, silver medalist(s)

== See also ==
- New Zealand women's national basketball team
- New Zealand women's national under-18 basketball team
- New Zealand men's national under-17 basketball team
