= Jay Rantall =

Australian rules footballer (born 2001)

Personal information
- Full name: Jay Rantall
- Born: 10 June 2001 (age 25); Warrnambool
- Original team: GWV Rebels (NAB League)
- Draft: No. 40, 2019 national draft
- Debut: Round 6, 2021, Collingwood vs. Essendon, at MCG
- Height: 186 cm (6 ft 1 in)
- Weight: 81 kg (179 lb)
- Position: Midfielder

Playing career^{1}
Years	Club	Games (Goals)
2020–2021	Collingwood	5 (0)
- ^{1} Playing statistics correct to the end of the 2021 season.

Jay Rantall (born 10 June 2001) is a former Australian rules footballer who played in five games for the Collingwood Football Club in the Australian Football League in 2021. He has also represented Australia internationally in basketball, playing for the under-17 team in the 2017 FIBA Under-16 Asian Championship and the 2018 FIBA Under-17 Basketball World Cup. Rantall now plays in Geelong’s VFL side as of 2025.

== Early life and state football ==
Rantall was born in Warrnambool and studied at Warrnambool College. He played junior football for South Warrnambool in the Hampden Football Netball League. While playing junior football, Rantall also played basketball with Warrnambool Seahawks in the Big V until 2018. He represented the Australian under-17 basketball team internationally, being selected for the 2017 FIBA Under-16 Asian Championship roster. In both group matches, Rantall led the Australian team with points, scoring 21 points against Malaysia and 15 points against the Philippines. Australia ended up winning the gold medal, beating China in the final. During the tournament, Rantall averaged double figure points a game, scoring 54 points over five matches. Australia's performance at the Asian Championship saw them qualify for the 2018 FIBA Under-17 Basketball World Cup, where Rantall was picked for the roster. The team reached the quarter-finals, where they lost narrowly to Canada. During the tournament, Rantall averaged 2.6 points a match, playing in all seven matches.

In late 2018, Rantall decided to commit to football after "falling in love" with the game. During the 2019 season, he played 12 games in the NAB League with GWV Rebels, kicking 11 goals and averaging 25 disposals and seven tackles. Following his performance, he won the club's best and fairest award and was selected for the NAB League Team of the Year. After his season at GWV Rebels, Rantall represented Vic Country at the 2019 AFL Under 18 Championships, playing in all four games and averaging 18.8 disposals and 3.5 tackles. In his first game, he starred against Vic Metro and was named as one of the best players of the match. The following week he kicked two goals against the Allies. During the 2019 AFL Draft Combine, Rantall showcased his endurance and broke the record for the 2 km time trial.

== AFL career ==
Rantall was drafted by Collingwood with their first pick of the 2019 national draft, which was the 40th pick overall. Shortly after the draft, he showed his endurance, winning the 2 km time trial at the club, marking the first time Tom Phillips lost since 2015. His endurance gives him an advantage towards the end of games, so in the 2020 AFL season he didn't shine as much due to the games being shorter due to the COVID-19 pandemic in Australia. In April 2021, After collecting 28 disposals in a Victorian Football League (VFL) game with Collingwood's reserves side, Rantall made his senior debut against Essendon in the annual Anzac Day match, which was the sixth round of the 2021 AFL season. During the game he showed promise, but the following week was an unused medical sub. At the end of the season Rantall was delisted by Collingwood.

== Personal life ==
Rantall currently studies a Bachelor of Exercise and Sport Science/Bachelor of Business (Sport Management) at Deakin University. Since then, Rantall has spent time playing in the SANFL and the VFL, most recently playing four matches for Werribee in the 2024 VFL season. But in 2025, he was selected to be in Geelong’s VFL side.

== Statistics ==
Statistics are correct to the end of the 2021 season

Legend
G	Goals	K	Kicks	D	Disposals	T	Tackles
B	Behinds	H	Handballs	M	Marks

Season	Team	No.	Games	Totals							Averages (per game)						
Season	Team	No.	Games	G	B	K	H	D	M	T	G	B	K	H	D	M	T
2020	Collingwood	35	0	–	–	–	–	–	–	–	–	–	–	–	–	–	–
2021	Collingwood	1	5	0	0	10	19	29	10	3	0.0	0.0	2.0	3.8	5.8	2.0	0.6
Career			5	0	0	10	19	29	10	3	0.0	0.0	2.0	3.8	5.8	2.0	0.6
