= 2018 FIBA Under-15 Women's Oceania Championship =

International basketball tournament

Tournament details
- Host country: Papua New Guinea
- City: Port Moresby
- Dates: 4–8 December 2018
- Teams: 5 (from 1 confederation)
- Venue: 1 (in 1 host city)

Final positions
- Champions: Australia (5th title)
- Runners-up: New Zealand
- Third place: Samoa

Official website
- www.fiba.basketball/history

The 2018 FIBA Under-15 Women's Oceania Championship was the fifth edition of the FIBA Under-15 Women's Oceania Championship. The tournament was played in Port Moresby, Papua New Guinea, from 4 to 8 December 2018.

== Participating teams ==
- Australia
- Fiji
- New Zealand
- Papua New Guinea
- Samoa

== Group phase ==
In this round, the teams played a round-robin tournament in one group. The top two teams advanced to the final; the next two teams advanced to the 3rd place match.

All times are local (Papua New Guinea Standard Time – UTC+10).

Pos	Team	Pld	W	L	PF	PA	PD	Pts	Qualification
1	Australia	4	4	0	501	96	+405	8	Final
2	New Zealand	4	3	1	293	199	+94	7	Final
3	Samoa	4	2	2	291	261	+30	6	3rd place match
4	Fiji	4	1	3	175	355	−180	5	3rd place match
5	Papua New Guinea (H)	4	0	4	116	465	−349	4	

Source: FIBA
(H) Hosts

4 December 2018
13:00

Boxscore

Samoa	29–111	Australia
Scoring by quarter: 6–26, 7–20, 9–37, 7–28

TAIC, Port Moresby

4 December 2018
17:00

Boxscore

New Zealand	108–15	Papua New Guinea
Scoring by quarter: 27–8, 38–0, 20–5, 23–2

TAIC, Port Moresby

5 December 2018
13:00

Boxscore

Australia	94–34	New Zealand
Scoring by quarter: 18–6, 23–5, 27–16, 26–7

TAIC, Port Moresby

5 December 2018
15:00

Boxscore

Papua New Guinea	46–85	Fiji
Scoring by quarter: 13–24, 16–15, 6–23, 11–23

TAIC, Port Moresby

6 December 2018
10:00

Boxscore

Fiji	15–141	Australia
Scoring by quarter: 5–33, 2–36, 2–34, 6–38

TAIC, Port Moresby

6 December 2018
11:00

Boxscore

New Zealand	65–63	Samoa
Scoring by quarter: 9–22, 29–11, 18–10, 9–20

TAIC, Port Moresby

6 December 2018
17:00

Boxscore

Samoa	82–48	Fiji
Scoring by quarter: 21–6, 14–19, 25–12, 22–11

TAIC, Port Moresby

6 December 2018
19:00

Boxscore

Australia	155–18	Papua New Guinea
Scoring by quarter: 42–4, 44–2, 35–3, 34–9

TAIC, Port Moresby

7 December 2018
11:00

Boxscore

Fiji	27–86	New Zealand
Scoring by quarter: 6–25, 9–30, 8–17, 4–14

TAIC, Port Moresby

7 December 2018
17:00

Boxscore

Papua New Guinea	37–117	Samoa
Scoring by quarter: 11–35, 10–25, 4–33, 12–24

TAIC, Port Moresby

== Playoffs ==
=== 3rd place match ===
8 December 2018
13:00

Boxscore

Samoa	80–41	Fiji
Scoring by quarter: 30–15, 17–4, 16–14, 17–8

TAIC, Port Moresby

=== Final ===
8 December 2018
17:00

Boxscore

Australia	110–30	New Zealand
Scoring by quarter: 24–5, 28–5, 23–13, 35–7

TAIC, Port Moresby

== Final standings ==
Rank	Team
1st place, gold medalist(s)	Australia
2nd place, silver medalist(s)	New Zealand
3rd place, bronze medalist(s)	Samoa
4	Fiji
5	Papua New Guinea
