= FIBA U15 Oceania Cup =

Under-15 continental basketball championship

- Most recent season or competition: 2024 FIBA U15 Oceania Cup
- Sport: Basketball
- Founded: 2009; 17 years ago
- Organizing body: FIBA Oceania
- No. of teams: 9
- Continent: Oceania
- Most recent champion: Australia (7th title)
- Most titles: Australia (7 titles)
- Qualification: FIBA U16 Asia Cup
- Related competitions: FIBA U17 Oceania Cup
- Website: www.fiba.basketball/history

The FIBA U15 Oceania Cup, formerly known as the FIBA Oceania Under-15 Championship, is an international boys' basketball tournament in the FIBA Oceania zone, inaugurated in 2009. The current champions are Australia.

Before 2018, the competition was known as the FIBA Oceania Under-16 Championship, which was a qualifier for the FIBA U17 World Cup. Now it's an under-15 competition for Oceanian teams to qualify for the FIBA U16 Asia Cup (from which they can qualify for the World Cup).

== Summary ==
=== Under-16 era ===
Year	Hosts	Final			Third place match		
Year	Hosts	Champions	Score	Runners-up	Third place	Score	Fourth place
2009; Details	(Australia); Brisbane	Australia	2–1; 74–45; 67–69; 65–55	New Zealand	No other teams competed		
2011; Details	(Australia); Canberra	Australia	3–0; 87–51; 86–48; 71–48	New Zealand	No other teams competed		
2013; Details	(Australia); Melbourne	Australia	2–1; 79–56; 79–68; 59–66	New Zealand	No other teams competed		
2015; Details	(New Zealand); Wellington	Australia	91–86	New Zealand	Tahiti	79–56	New Caledonia

=== Under-15 era ===
Year	Hosts	Final			Third place match		
Year	Hosts	Champions	Score	Runners-up	Third place	Score	Fourth place
2018; Details	(Papua New Guinea); Port Moresby	Australia	61–58	New Zealand	Samoa	74–52	Guam
2020	Cancelled due to COVID-19 pandemic in Oceania						
2022; Details	(Guam); Mangilao	Australia	85–74	New Zealand	Guam	78–69	Samoa
2024; Details	(Australia); Canberra	Australia	96–68	New Zealand	Samoa	113–76	Tonga
2026; Details	(New Zealand); Auckland		–			–	

== Medal table ==
Rank	Nation	Gold	Silver	Bronze	Total
1	Australia	7	0	0	7
2	New Zealand	0	7	0	7
3	Samoa	0	0	2	2
4	Guam	0	0	1	1
4	Tahiti	0	0	1	1
Totals (5 entries)		7	7	4	18

== Participation details ==
Team	(Australia) 2009	(Australia) 2011	(Australia) 2013	(New Zealand) 2015	(Papua New Guinea) 2018	(Guam) 2022	(Australia) 2024	(New Zealand) 2026	Total
Australia	1st	1st	1st	1st	1st	1st	1st	Q	8
Cook Islands							8th	Q	2
Fiji					5th		7th	Q	3
Guam					4th	3rd	5th	Q	4
F.S. Micronesia						5th			1
New Caledonia				4th			9th		2
New Zealand	2nd	2nd	2nd	2nd	2nd	2nd	2nd	Q	8
Northern Mariana Islands						7th			1
Papua New Guinea					6th	6th			2
Samoa					3rd	4th	3rd	Q	4
Tahiti				3rd			6th		2
Tonga							4th	Q	2
Total	2	2	2	4	6	7	9	7	
