= AFL Draft Combine =

Australian rules football training camp

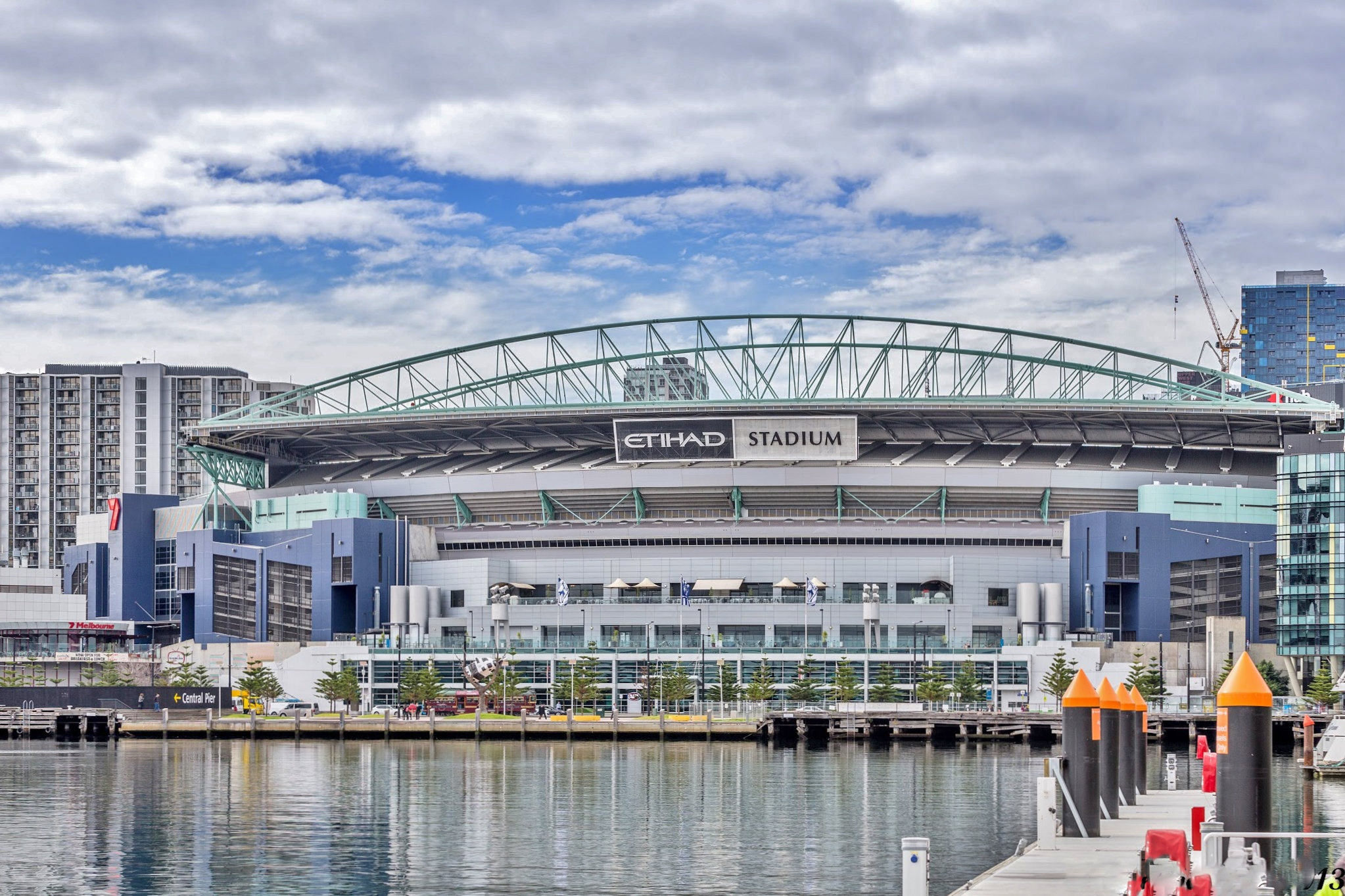
Docklands Stadium, where the AFL Draft Combine is held.

The AFL Draft Combine, formerly known as the AFL Draft Camp, is a gathering of prospective talent, where selected potential draftees display their athletic prowess and relevant Australian rules football skills. Over four days participants are required to undergo a series of medical, psychomotor, athletic and fitness tests as well as interviews conducted by the 18 clubs in the Australian Football League. The first AFL Draft Camp was held in 1994 at Waverley Park; in 1999 it moved to Canberra, where it was hosted by the Australian Institute of Sport, and in 2011 it was moved to Docklands Stadium. Each year the Draft Combine is held in the week following the AFL Grand Final.

Through various partnerships the AFL also conducts draft combines around the world with AFL International Combine having been held in Ireland, the United States and New Zealand. However unlike the Draft Combine the primary aim of International Combines is to supply secondary talent through the Rookie draft.

== Purpose ==
The testing results measured at the combine are used to inform recruiters of players' athletic attributes and skills heading into the AFL draft, which is held in November. Recruiters also have the opportunity to interview participants whom they may potentially want to draft. Clubs are able to send a representative to the combine, where they are able to conduct a medical screening on participants. This screening gives clubs an idea of a player's past injuries and future injury concerns.

== Invitations ==
To be eligible for the AFL Draft Combine, a player must receive at least 5 nominations from AFL clubs. Leading into the combine, AFL recruiting managers are expected to submit a list of 70 players from the draft pool whom they would like to screen at the national combine. Approximately 100 invitees attend the draft combine. Draft hopefuls who don't receive enough nominations for the national combine but still receive 3 or 4 nominations have the opportunity to attend their respective state screening.

Players who are overlooked for the national combine may be invited to attend a state-based combine, where similar testing is done.

== Tests ==
The following tests performed at the combine are associated with the attributes required to perform in the AFL.

=== Beep test (shuttle run) ===
Players are to finish a 20-metre leg before the sound of the beep; they continue to run back and forth as the time in between each beep gets shorter. The test starts at level 1 and finishes at level 21. When a person fails to make the line before the beep, they no longer are allowed to continue. This test was replaced with the yo-yo test in 2017.

=== Long-distance time trial ===
In groups of 10–20, players are to complete a 3000-metre run as fast as they can. The finishing time is then recorded. This was replaced by the 2 km time trial in 2017.

=== Repeat sprint test ===
This test is designed to measure both speed and endurance. Here players complete six 30-metre sprints, with the cumulative time recorded.

=== Agility test ===
The player starts standing upright; once they pass through the gates, the player is to navigate around a series of poles (without touching them or knocking them down) and reach the finishing gates as quickly as possible.

=== 20-metre sprint ===
This is to measure a player's speed. The individual being tested begins in a crouched position. They are then to sprint as fast as they can up to 20 metres. Sensors are used to measure the time taken to the 5m, 10m and 20m mark. Each player is given 3 attempts at this, with the quickest time being recorded.

=== Running vertical jump ===
This test measures a player's vertical while jumping off one leg from a running start. It uses a 'Vertec' device to measure their vertical reach while in the air.

=== Standing vertical jump ===
This is similar to the running vertical jump; however, the player instead takes off on two feet from a stationary start. The aim again is to hit the fingers as high up as possible on the Vertec.

=== Nathan Buckley kicking test ===
This test was devised by Nathan Buckley and is used to measure a player's kicking efficiency over six kicks. Six targets are set out at distances of 20, 30 and 40 metres. An official is designated to request a target at random and call the instructions out to the kicker. The kicker then proceeds hit the target. Each kick is given a score from one to five (five being the perfect kick).

=== Matthew Lloyd clean hands test ===
Matthew Lloyd designed this test to measure how well a player takes possession of a football and is able to dispose of it using a handball. Three targets are set up on both the left and right sides at distances of 6, 8 and 10 metres. The test starts with an official either rolling or throwing a football at the player; an instruction of what target to hit is then called out by the official. The player then attempts to handball the ball at the target. This is done six times, and a score from one to five is allocated for each handball.

=== Brad Johnson goal-touching test ===
This test was constructed by Brad Johnson and measures a player's accuracy kicking for goal. This test takes place on an oval with four markers placed at different angles and distances to kick from. Five kicks are taken in total: two set shots, two snaps (one left and one right) and one kick on the run. A score is then derived from the number of goals and behinds a player kicks.

=== Physical ===
Measurements of a player's height, weight, skinfolds, arm length and hand span are all recorded.

=== Testing records ===
Best Performances: 2 km Time Trial	Time	Year
Harry Sharp	5:28	2020
Cooper Hamilton	5:48	2021
Jay Rantall	5:50	2019
Finn Maginness	5:51	2019
Fraser Rosman	5:52	2020

Best Performances: 3 km Time Trial	Time	Year
Joshua Schoenfeld	9:15	2015
Jack Hiscox	9:17	2014
Josh Kelly	9:32	2013
Tim Houlihan	9:37	2006
Tom Lamb	9:45	2014

Best Performances: Beep Test	Level	Year
Billy Hartung	16.06	2013
Caleb Daniel	16.01	2014
Bradley Hill	16.01	2011
Jack Hiscox	16.01	2014
Will Hoskin-Elliot	15.12	2011

Best Performances: Agility	Time (seconds)	Year
Darcy Jones	7.70	2022
Stephen Hill	7.77	2008
Danyle Pearce	7.79	2004
Nathan Van Berlo	7.80	2004
Elliot Yeo	7.80	2011

The fastest agility test ever recorded at any AFL combine was 7.761 seconds by Tyrone Thorne at the 2019 Western Australia draft combine.

Best Performances: Standing Vertical Jump	Height (cm)	Year
Aiden Bonar	89	2017
Marvin Baynham	88	2014
Dean Towers	85	2012
Jesse Lonergan	83	2012
Spencer White	82	2012

- The highest standing vertical jump ever recorded at any AFL combine was 91.4 cm by American prospect Justin Wesley at the 2014 US International Combine in Los Angeles.

Best Performances: Running Vertical Jump	Height (cm)	Year
Leek Aleer	107	2021
Kyron Hayden	103	2017
Nic Naitanui	102	2008
Jared Brennan	102	2002
Chad Warner	100	2021

Best Performances: Repeat Sprint	Time (seconds)	Year
Joel Wilkinson	23.40	2010
Brad Harvey	23.46	2010
Shaun Atley	23.69	2010
Kieran Harper	23.84	2010
Jack Fitzpatrick	23.91	2009

Best Performances: 20m Sprint	Time (seconds)	Year
Joel Wilkinson	2.75	2010
Jonathan Marsh	2.78	2013
Danyle Pearce	2.79	2004
Ashley Smith	2.80	2008
Edward Allan	2.81	2022

- Justin Wesley recorded a 2.81 at the 2014 US International Combine. Reef McInnes recorded a 2.779 in 2020; however, as the sprint was held outside in a tailwind, this time is not included in records.

== AFL International Combine ==
Since the 2000s, the AFL began to look to increasingly recruit athletic talent from outside Australia. It is estimated over 100,000 people participate in the sport outside Australia and the Australian Football International Cup takes place every three years in Melbourne, where teams from 18 countries compete against each other. With the exception of international rookies, the AFL however has traditionally looked outside of its grassroots player base for amateur and professional athletes from other sports with transferrable skills. As such this is the primary aim of the International Combines.

All AFL international combines have been indefinitely postponed since the COVID-19 pandemic.

=== US Combine ===
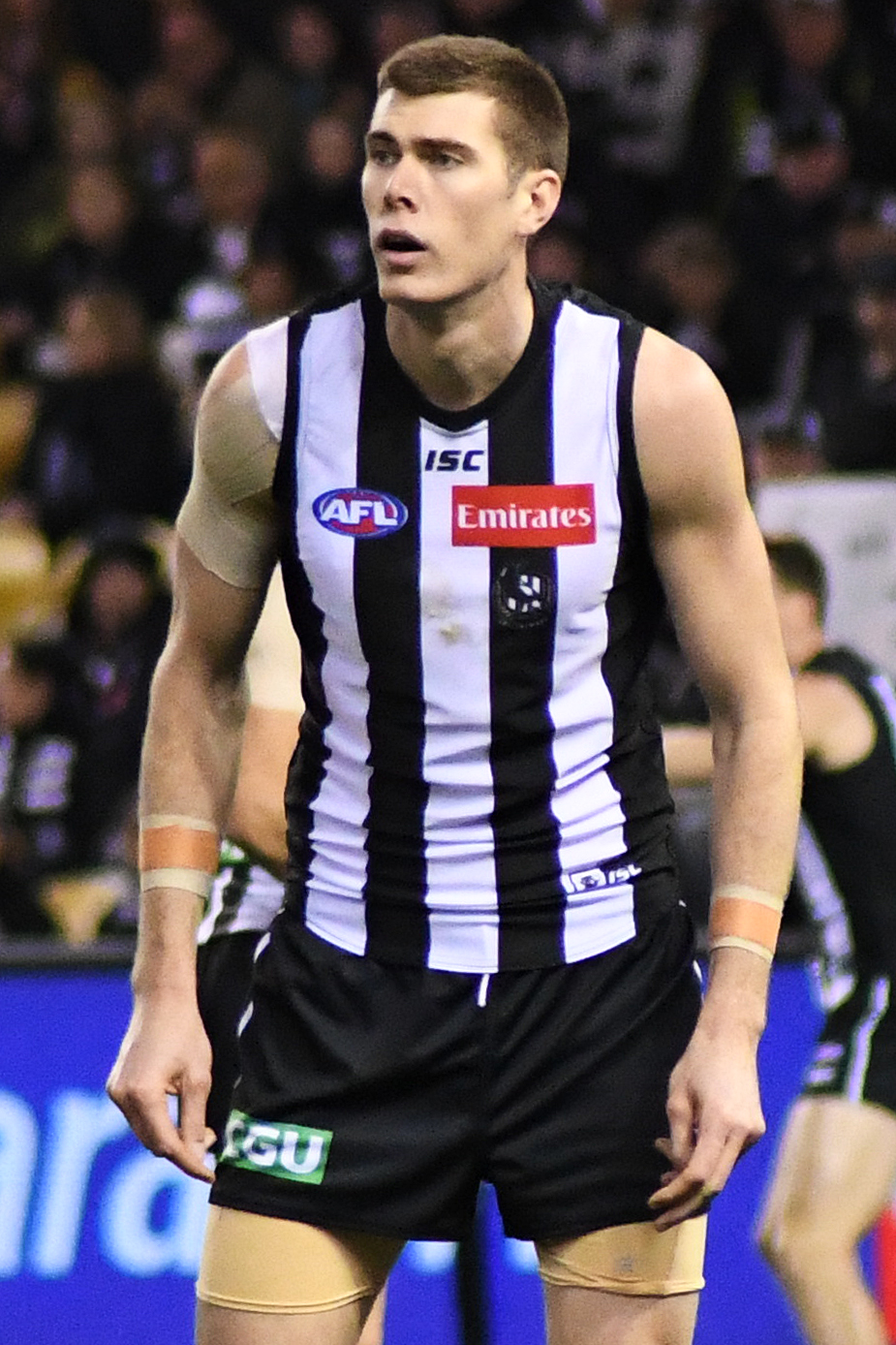
Mason Cox, an American college basketball player, is the most successful talent unearthed at an international combine, playing more than 100 senior AFL games.

The US AFL Combine was held annually between 2012 and 2017. The first combine was run in 2012, and it has been run semi-annually since 2017. Each year, a minimum of two of the group were chosen to partake in the AFL National Combine held in Melbourne. From 2015, the AFL shifted its focus exclusively to rucks; and, as such, all 15 participants from the 2015 combine were from a college basketball background. After a poor yield between 2015 and 2017 while scouting for American athletes over 2 metres tall, the AFL put the program on hold to focus on talent in Ireland and New Zealand.

Notable combines:

Year	Location	Dates	Notable participants
2012	Los Angeles		Eric Wallace (signed by North Melbourne)
2013	Los Angeles		Patrick Mitchell (signed by Sydney)
2014	Los Angeles		Jason Holmes (signed by St Kilda); Mason Cox (signed by Collingwood)
2015	Los Angeles	April 24–27	Matt Korcheck (signed by Carlton)
2016	Bradenton, Florida	January	Darragh Joyce (signed by St Kilda); Ray Connellan (signed by St Kilda); Cillian McDaid (signed by Carlton) (note all three of the 2016 prospects flew from Ireland to be tested in the US)
2017	Los Angeles	May	Anton Tohill (signed by Collingwood) (flew from Ireland to be tested in the US)

=== European Combine ===
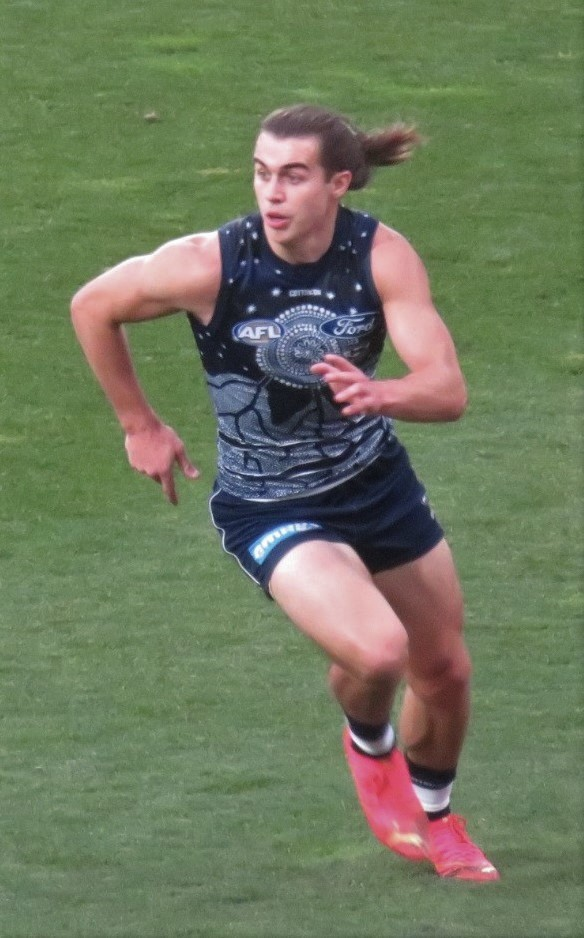
Oisín Mullin, a gaelic footballer from County Mayo, Ireland, was signed by Geelong in 2021, began playing Australian rules in November 2022, and made his AFL debut in May 2023

The European Combine has been held annually since 2010 and overseen by the AFL. Since 2015, it has been run by International Talent Manager Tadhg Kennelly, a former player for the Sydney Swans who was originally drafted from Ireland.

All of the early trials were held in Dublin. Among those who try out, a large proportion are Gaelic footballers, as the skill set of Gaelic football is considered similar to that of AFL. Unlike the key positions sought from US and New Zealand athletes, AFL clubs are typically searching Ireland's gaelic talent for running midfielders and attacking (rebound) defenders. The two best-performing participants at the combine are then given the opportunity to attend the AFL National Combine.

To date, only a couple of the tested players have been successful at AFL level, with the majority of successful Irish players scouted by other means. During a drought in combine talent, former Irish player Pearce Hanley in 2016 was critical of the format as a recruiting method due to its primary focus on athletic testing over game adaptability. Many of the more successful players have been recruited directly or—in the case of Colin O'Riordan, Conor Glass and Mark O'Connor—bypassed the European Combine altogether, instead flying directly to Melbourne, Australia, to participate in the AFL Combine there, where they have a more direct recruitment pathway. Others did not sign at the event but decided to sign sometime later, as was the case of Darragh Joyce.

In 2019, a women's combine was run for the first time as part of a pathway to the AFL Women's competition.

In 2022, the AFL flagged a return of the European Combine; however, it did not oversee them in 2023, with independent recruiters holding trials in Ireland instead.

Notable combines:

Year	Location	Dates	Notable participants
2012	National Basketball Arena, Tallaght, Dublin	February	Sean Hurley (signed by Fremantle); Ciaran Kilkenny (signed by Hawthorn)
2013	Dublin	12-13 February	Daniel Flynn (signed by Port Adelaide); Ciarán Byrne (signed by Carlton); Ciarán Sheehan (signed by Carlton)
2014	Dublin	13-14 December	Paddy Brophy (signed by West Coast Eagles); Padraig Lucey (signed by Geelong)
2015	Dublin	5 December	Cian Hanley (signed by Brisbane Lions); Darragh Joyce
2016	Dublin	11-12 November	No signings
2017	Dublin	2 December	Cillian McDaid (signed by Carlton); James Madden (signed by Brisbane Lions); Mark Keane (signed by Collingwood); Anton Tohill (signed by Collingwood); Stefan Okunbor (signed by Geelong)
2018	Dublin		Luke Towey (signed by Gold Coast Suns)
2019	Dublin	7–8 December	Deividas Uosis (signed by Brisbane Lions); Ross McQuillan (signed by Essendon); Ultan Kelm (signed by Fremantle); Oisín Mullin (signed by Geelong); Vikki Wall (signed by North Melbourne AFLW)
2020	Dublin		No signings due to impact of COVID-19 pandemic

=== New Zealand Combine ===
The first New Zealand combine was held in 2013. Unlike the combines in the US and Europe, New Zealand's combine targets mainly junior (under-18s) rugby and soccer players with key-position potential. Kurt Heatherley was signed by Hawthorn via the AFL Combine in Melbourne in 2012 before the New Zealand combines had begun. The first women's combine was held in 2014.

Notable combines:

Year	Location	Dates	Notable participants
2013	ASB Sports Centre, Wellington	24 January	Siope Ngata (signed by Hawthorn – U15 international scholarship), Maia Westrupp (signed by Melbourne – international scholarship)
2014	ASB Sports Centre, Wellington	23 January	Giovanni Mountain Silbery (signed by St Kilda – international scholarship); Killarney Morey (signed by Sydney Swans women's Academy)
2015	ASB Sports Centre, Wellington	23 April	
2016	Trusts Arena, Auckland	21 April	William Warbrick
2017	ASB Sports Centre, Wellington	April	Mykelti Lefau (signed by Richmond VFL); Misilifi Faimalo (signed by Richmond VFL)
2018	ASB Sports Centre, Wellington	23 April	
2019	Secondary Schools Combine (various)		
