= Chikara Tanaka =

Japanese basketball player (born 2002)

Chikara Tanaka 田中力
No. 2 – Yokohama B-Corsairs
- Position: Point guard
- League: B.League

Personal information
- Born: 4 May 2002 (age 24) Aomori, Japan
- Listed height: 1.86 m (6 ft 1 in)
- Listed weight: 88 kg (194 lb)

Career information
- High school: IMG Academy (Bradenton, Florida); Veritas National Prep School (Santa Fe Springs, California)
- College: Bethel (2022-2023)

Career history
- 2023-present: Yokohama B-Corsairs

Chikara Tanaka (田中力, たなか ちから, Tanaka Chikara; born 4 May 2002) is a Japanese basketball player for Yokohama B-Corsairs. He previously attended IMG Academy in Bradenton, Florida.

== Early life and career ==
Tanaka was born in Aomori Prefecture to an American father and a Japanese mother. He briefly lived in Hawaiʻi as a child and was raised in Yokohama, Japan. Tanaka grew up skateboarding but was encouraged by his friends to play basketball due to his height.

== High school career ==
Tanaka attended Sakamoto Junior High School in Yokosuka and played for the youth team of the Yokohama B-Corsairs. In 2017, he led his team to second place at the B.League Under-15 Championship.

In 2018, Tanaka began attending IMG Academy in Bradenton, Florida, joining one of the best high school teams in the United States.

In February 2019, he participated in the Basketball Without Borders Global Camp during 2019 NBA All-Star Weekend in Charlotte, North Carolina.

In 2020, Tanaka left IMG due to mental health issues off court and transferred to Kahuku High School in Kahuku, Hawaiʻi. After the season was canceled due to the COVID-19 pandemic, he traveled to Utah where he attended the All-Academic Basketball camp and received an offer from the University of Utah. However, Tanaka lost his roster spot due to the extension given by the NCAA Division I Council to all players for the pandemic-altered season.

In 2021, he transferred to Veritas National Prep School in Santa Fe Springs, California, where he continued his post-graduate.

Tanaka played for the Bethel University men's basketball team for the 2022-2023. He left the team to pursue a professional career in his native Japan

== National team career ==
In January 2018, Tanaka led the Japanese under-16 team to the title of the Crystal Bohemia Cup in the Czech Republic, earning tournament most valuable player honors. Later that year, he averaged 15.2 points, 4.5 rebounds and 1.7 assists per game for Japan at the FIBA Under-16 Asian Championship. Tanaka was invited to training camp with the Japanese senior national team for the 2019 FIBA Basketball World Cup qualification stage.
