= Guam men's national under-15 basketball team =

Youth national basketball team

Guam
- Joined FIBA: 1974
- FIBA zone: FIBA Oceania
- National federation: Guam Basketball Confederation

U17 World Cup
- Appearances: None

U16 Asia Cup
- Appearances: None

U15 Oceania Cup
- Appearances: 3
- Medals: (bronze) Bronze: 1 (2022)

The Guam men's national under-15 basketball team is the boys' national basketball team of Guam, administered by the Guam Basketball Confederation. It represents the country in international under-15 men's basketball competitions.

== FIBA U15 Oceania Cup participations ==
Year	Result
2018	4th
2022	3rd place, bronze medalist(s)
2024	5th

== See also ==
- Guam men's national basketball team
- Guam men's national under-17 and under-18 basketball team
- Guam women's national under-15 and under-16 basketball team
