= Fiji women's national under-15 basketball team =

Fiji
- FIBA zone: FIBA Oceania
- National federation: Fiji Amateur Basketball Federation

U17 World Cup
- Appearances: None

U16 Asia Cup
- Appearances: None

U15 Oceania Cup
- Appearances: 2
- Medals: None

The Fiji women's national under-15 basketball team is a national basketball team of Fiji, administered by the Fiji Amateur Basketball Federation. It represents the country in international under-15 women's basketball competitions.

== FIBA U15 Women's Oceania Cup participations ==
Year	Result
2018	4th
2024	7th

== See also ==
- Fiji women's national basketball team
- Fiji women's national under-18 basketball team
- Fiji men's national under-15 basketball team
