= 2022 FIBA Under-15 Women's Oceania Championship =

International youth basketball tournament

Tournament details
- Host country: Guam
- City: Mangilao
- Dates: 21–26 November 2022
- Teams: 6 (from 1 confederation)
- Venue: 1 (in 1 host city)

Final positions
- Champions: Australia (6th title)
- Runners-up: New Zealand
- Third place: Samoa

Official website
- www.fiba.basketball/history

The 2022 FIBA Under-15 Women's Oceania Championship was the sixth edition of the FIBA Under-15 Women's Oceania Championship. The tournament was played in Mangilao, Guam, from 21 to 26 November 2022.

== Participating teams ==
- Australia
- Guam
- New Zealand
- Northern Mariana Islands
- Papua New Guinea
- Samoa

== Group phase ==
In this round, the teams were assigned to two groups of three. The top three seeded teams played in Group A; the other teams in Group B.

All times are local (Chamorro Standard Time – UTC+10).

=== Group A ===
Pos	Team	Pld	W	L	PF	PA	PD	Pts	Qualification
1	Australia	2	2	0	220	93	+127	4	Semifinals
2	New Zealand	2	1	1	135	185	−50	3	Quarterfinals
3	Samoa	2	0	2	106	183	−77	2	Quarterfinals

Source: FIBA

21 November 2022
14:30

Boxscore

Australia	105–36	Samoa
Scoring by quarter: 30–5, 24–11, 28–10, 23–10

University of Guam Field House

22 November 2022
10:00

Boxscore

Samoa	70–78	New Zealand
Scoring by quarter: 14–25, 29–18, 15–20, 12–15

University of Guam Field House

23 November 2022
12:15

Boxscore

New Zealand	57–115	Australia
Scoring by quarter: 11–34, 21–32, 17–23, 8–26

University of Guam Field House

=== Group B ===
Pos	Team	Pld	W	L	PF	PA	PD	Pts	Qualification
1	Guam (H)	2	2	0	206	60	+146	4	Quarterfinals
2	Northern Mariana Islands	2	1	1	127	158	−31	3	Quarterfinals
3	Papua New Guinea	2	0	2	96	211	−115	2	5th place match

Source: FIBA
(H) Hosts

21 November 2022
12:15

Boxscore

Northern Mariana Islands	37–85	Guam
Scoring by quarter: 13–22, 9–23, 5–17, 10–23

University of Guam Field House

22 November 2022
16:45

Boxscore

Guam	121–23	Papua New Guinea
Scoring by quarter: 24–8, 31–11, 34–0, 32–4

University of Guam Field House

23 November 2022
10:00

Boxscore

Papua New Guinea	73–90	Northern Mariana Islands
Scoring by quarter: 11–19, 19–13, 26–16, 17–42

University of Guam Field House

== Playoffs ==
=== Quarterfinals ===
24 November 2022
9:00

Boxscore

New Zealand	99–51	Guam
Scoring by quarter: 24–8, 36–16, 22–15, 17–12

University of Guam Field House

24 November 2022
13:30

Boxscore

Samoa	135–26	Northern Mariana Islands
Scoring by quarter: 39–7, 24–8, 38–3, 34–8

University of Guam Field House

=== Semifinals ===
25 November 2022
13:30

Boxscore

New Zealand	74–54	Samoa
Scoring by quarter: 18–14, 14–16, 18–17, 24–7

University of Guam Field House

25 November 2022
15:45

Boxscore

Australia	124–29	Guam
Scoring by quarter: 42–12, 34–6, 23–9, 25–2

University of Guam Field House

=== 5th place match ===
25 November 2022
11:15

Boxscore

Papua New Guinea	67–66	Northern Mariana Islands
Scoring by quarter: 17–11, 15–14, 23–21, 12–20

University of Guam Field House

=== 3rd place match ===
26 November 2022
12:15

Boxscore

Samoa	92–50	Guam
Scoring by quarter: 27–15, 26–14, 17–12, 22–9

University of Guam Field House

=== Final ===
26 November 2022
16:45

Boxscore

New Zealand	54–100	Australia
Scoring by quarter: 15–17, 11–29, 15–24, 13–30

University of Guam Field House

== Final standings ==
Rank	Team
1st place, gold medalist(s)	Australia
2nd place, silver medalist(s)	New Zealand
3rd place, bronze medalist(s)	Samoa
4	Guam
5	Papua New Guinea
6	Northern Mariana Islands
