= Guam women's national under-15 and under-16 basketball team =

Youth national basketball team

Guam
- Joined FIBA: 1974
- FIBA zone: FIBA Oceania
- National federation: Guam Basketball Confederation

U17 World Cup
- Appearances: None

U16 Asia Cup Division A
- Appearances: None

U16 Asia Cup Division B
- Appearances: 1
- Medals: None

U15 Oceania Cup
- Appearances: 2
- Medals: None

The Guam women's national under-15 and under-16 basketball team is the girls' national basketball team of Guam, administered by the Guam Basketball Confederation. It represents the country in women's international under-15 and under-16 basketball competitions.

== FIBA U15 Women's Oceania Cup participations ==
Year	Result
2022	4th
2024	5th

== FIBA Under-16 Women's Asia Cup participations ==
Year	Division A	Division B
2023	—N/a	7th

== See also ==
- Guam women's national basketball team
- Guam men's national under-15 basketball team
