= New Caledonia women's national under-15 basketball team =

Youth national basketball team

New Caledonia
- FIBA zone: FIBA Oceania
- National federation: Région Fédérale de Nouvelle Calédonie de Basketball

U17 World Cup
- Appearances: None

U16 Asia Cup
- Appearances: None

U15/U16 Oceania Cup
- Appearances: 2
- Medals: None

The New Caledonia women's national under-15 basketball team is a national basketball team of New Caledonia, administered by the Région Fédérale de Nouvelle Calédonie de Basketball. It represents the country in international under-15 women's basketball competitions.

== FIBA U15 Women's Oceania Cup participations ==
Year	Result
2015	4th
2024	6th

== See also ==
- New Caledonia women's national basketball team
- New Caledonia women's national under-18 basketball team
- New Caledonia men's national under-15 basketball team
