= 2022 FIBA Under-15 Oceania Championship =

International youth basketball tournament

Tournament details
- Host country: Guam
- City: Mangilao
- Dates: 21–26 November 2022
- Teams: 7 (from 1 confederation)
- Venue: 1 (in 1 host city)

Final positions
- Champions: Australia (6th title)
- Runners-up: New Zealand
- Third place: Guam

Official website
- www.fiba.basketball/history

The 2022 FIBA Under-15 Oceania Championship was the sixth edition of the FIBA Under-15 Oceania Championship. The tournament was played in Mangilao, Guam, from 21 to 26 November 2022.

== Participating teams ==
- Australia
- Guam
- Micronesia
- New Zealand
- Northern Mariana Islands
- Papua New Guinea
- Samoa

== Group phase ==
In this round, the teams were assigned to two tiered groups. The top four seeded teams played in Group A; the other teams in Group B.

All times are local (Chamorro Standard Time – UTC+10).

=== Group A ===
Pos	Team	Pld	W	L	PF	PA	PD	Pts	Qualification
1	Australia	3	3	0	367	148	+219	6	Semifinals
2	New Zealand	3	2	1	318	198	+120	5	Semifinals
3	Guam	3	1	2	158	329	−171	4	Quarterfinals
4	Samoa	3	0	3	136	304	−168	3	Quarterfinals

Source: FIBA

21 November 2022
16:45

Boxscore

New Zealand	104–44	Samoa
Scoring by quarter: 25–20, 17–5, 31–5, 31–14

University of Guam Field House

21 November 2022
19:00

Boxscore

Australia	136–35	Guam
Scoring by quarter: 39–5, 29–2, 28–14, 40–14

University of Guam Field House

22 November 2022
12:15

Boxscore

Samoa	24–131	Australia
Scoring by quarter: 11–29, 2–40, 5–26, 6–36

University of Guam Field House

22 November 2022
19:00

Boxscore

Guam	54–125	New Zealand
Scoring by quarter: 11–20, 18–45, 10–26, 15–34

University of Guam Field House

23 November 2022
16:45

Boxscore

New Zealand	89–100	Australia
Scoring by quarter: 31–25, 8–27, 28–26, 22–22

University of Guam Field House

23 November 2022
19:00

Boxscore

Samoa	68–69	Guam
Scoring by quarter: 17–16, 11–20, 28–16, 12–17

University of Guam Field House

=== Group B ===
Pos	Team	Pld	W	L	PF	PA	PD	Pts	Qualification
1	Micronesia	2	2	0	174	143	+31	4	Quarterfinals
2	Papua New Guinea	2	1	1	174	170	+4	3	Quarterfinals
3	Northern Mariana Islands	2	0	2	153	188	−35	2	5th–7th place classification

Source: FIBA

21 November 2022
10:00

Boxscore

Northern Mariana Islands	68–89	Micronesia
Scoring by quarter: 19–17, 17–30, 22–24, 10–18

University of Guam Field House

22 November 2022
14:30

Boxscore

Papua New Guinea	99–85	Northern Mariana Islands
Scoring by quarter: 17–16, 23–22, 31–13, 28–34

University of Guam Field House

23 November 2022
14:30

Boxscore

Papua New Guinea	75–85	Micronesia
Scoring by quarter: 20–24, 17–16, 18–26, 20–19

University of Guam Field House

== Playoffs ==
Quarterfinals
A4	Samoa	99
B1	Micronesia	41
A3	Guam	102
B2	Papua New Guinea	71

Semifinals
A1	Australia	110
A4	Samoa	46
A2	New Zealand	116
A3	Guam	70

Final
A1	Australia	85
A2	New Zealand	74
3rd place match
A4	Samoa	69
A3	Guam	78

=== Quarterfinals ===
24 November 2022
11:15

Boxscore

Guam	102–71	Papua New Guinea
Scoring by quarter: 22–22, 16–21, 29–13, 35–15

University of Guam Field House

24 November 2022
15:45

Boxscore

Samoa	99–41	Micronesia
Scoring by quarter: 27–7, 20–14, 23–8, 29–12

University of Guam Field House

=== 5th–7th place classification ===
25 November 2022
9:00

Boxscore

Northern Mariana Islands	68–77	Micronesia
Scoring by quarter: 15–10, 8–32, 19–17, 26–18

University of Guam Field House

26 November 2022
10:00

Boxscore

Northern Mariana Islands	68–69	Papua New Guinea
Scoring by quarter: 18–16, 14–20, 18–14, 18–19

University of Guam Field House

=== Semifinals ===
25 November 2022
18:00

Boxscore

Australia	110–46	Samoa
Scoring by quarter: 30–13, 22–9, 31–12, 27–12

University of Guam Field House

25 November 2022
20:15

Boxscore

New Zealand	116–70	Guam
Scoring by quarter: 36–11, 23–15, 30–23, 27–21

University of Guam Field House

=== 3rd place match ===
26 November 2022
14:30

Boxscore

Samoa	69–78	Guam
Scoring by quarter: 11–17, 21–10, 18–21, 19–30

University of Guam Field House

=== Final ===
26 November 2022
19:00

Boxscore

Australia	85–74	New Zealand
Scoring by quarter: 25–23, 18–14, 17–19, 25–18

University of Guam Field House

== Final standings ==
Rank	Team
1st place, gold medalist(s)	Australia
2nd place, silver medalist(s)	New Zealand
3rd place, bronze medalist(s)	Guam
4	Samoa
5	Micronesia
6	Papua New Guinea
7	Northern Mariana Islands
