= Darragh Joyce =

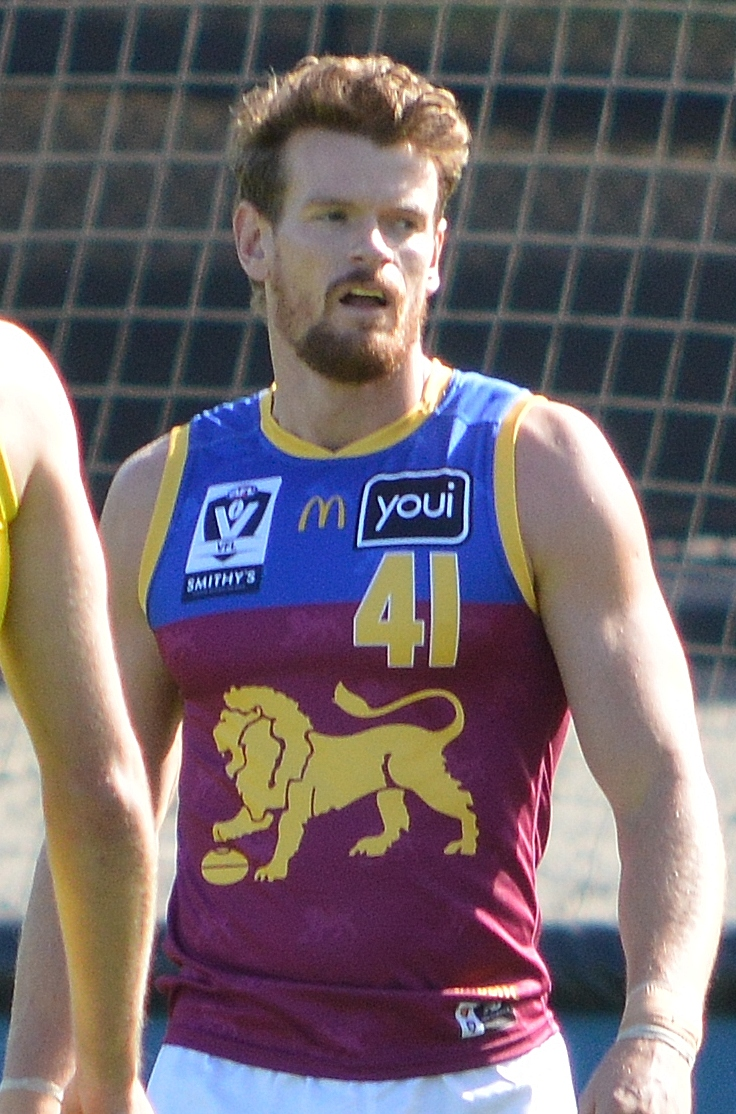
- Joyce in April 2025

Personal information
- Nickname: DJ
- Born: 23 April 1997 (age 29)
- Original team: Kilkenny GAA
- Debut: 1 July 2018, St Kilda vs. Melbourne, at the MCG
- Height: 195 cm (6 ft 5 in)
- Weight: 96 kg (212 lb)
- Position: Defender

Club information
- Current club: North Melbourne
- Number: TBC

Playing career^{1}
Years	Club	Games (Goals)
2018–2022	St Kilda	13 (0)
2023–2026	Brisbane Lions	14 (0)
2027–	North Melbourne	0 (0)
Total		27 (0)
- ^{1} Playing statistics correct to the end of 2026.

Darragh Joyce (born 23 April 1997) is a professional Australian rules footballer playing for the North Melbourne Football Club in the Australian Football League (AFL). He was originally recruited to the St Kilda Football Club before joining the Brisbane Lions. He made his debut in round 15 of the 2018 season against Melbourne at the Melbourne Cricket Ground.

== AFL career ==
Joyce is originally from Ireland and played hurling for his county Kilkenny and also for club Rower–Inistioge. He tested at the 2015 AFL Draft Combine, but did not sign with a club because of concerns about homesickness. Joyce trialled with St Kilda in June 2016, and joined as a Category B International Rookie before the 2017 season. He played for St Kilda's Victorian Football League affiliate Sandringham, but struggled for form and was dropped to the reserves. Coach Lindsay Gilbee commented that "[Joyce] came back a much better player". Joyce signed a two-year contract extension in July 2019, extending his stay until the end of 2021. Joyce was delisted by the Saints at the end of 2022, but was later picked up as a rookie by the Brisbane Lions ahead of the 2023 AFL season.

== Family ==
Joyce is the brother of former Kilkenny hurler Kieran Joyce, and the cousin of former Essendon footballer Kevin Walsh.

== Statistics ==
Updated to the end of round 22, 2026.

Legend
G	Goals	K	Kicks	D	Disposals	T	Tackles
B	Behinds	H	Handballs	M	Marks

Season	Team	No.	Games	Totals							Averages (per game)							Votes
Season	Team	No.	Games	G	B	K	H	D	M	T	G	B	K	H	D	M	T	Votes
2018	St Kilda	39	2	0	1	7	6	13	4	1	0.0	0.5	3.5	3.0	6.5	2.0	0.5	0
2019	St Kilda	39	3	0	0	27	17	44	5	6	0.0	0.0	9.0	5.7	14.7	1.7	2.0	0
2021	St Kilda	39	5	0	0	36	11	47	13	4	0.0	0.0	7.2	2.2	9.4	2.6	0.8	0
2022	St Kilda	39	3	0	0	11	7	18	4	2	0.0	0.0	3.7	2.3	6.0	1.3	0.7	0
2023	Brisbane Lions	41	5	0	0	37	6	43	25	2	0.0	0.0	7.4	1.2	8.6	5.0	0.4	0
2024	Brisbane Lions	41	6	0	0	55	16	71	30	2	0.0	0.0	9.2	2.7	11.8	5.0	0.3	0
2025	Brisbane Lions	41	0	—	—	—	—	—	—	—	—	—	—	—	—	—	—	0
2026	Brisbane Lions	41	3	0	0	26	4	30	19	1	0.0	0.0	8.7	1.3	10.0	6.3	0.3	0
Career			27	0	1	199	67	266	100	18	0.0	0.0	7.4	2.5	9.9	3.7	0.7	0
