= 2024 FIBA U15 Oceania Cup =

International youth basketball tournament

Tournament details
- Host country: Australia
- City: Canberra
- Dates: 11–16 November 2024
- Teams: 9 (from 1 confederation)
- Venues: 2 (in 1 host city)

Final positions
- Champions: Australia (7th title)
- Runners-up: New Zealand
- Third place: Samoa

Official website
- www.fiba.basketball

The 2024 FIBA U15 Oceania Cup was the seventh edition of the FIBA U15 Oceania Cup. The tournament was played in Canberra, Australia, from 11 to 16 November 2024. Australia became the Oceanian champions for the seventh consecutive time.

== Participating teams ==
- Australia
- Cook Islands
- Fiji
- Guam
- New Caledonia
- New Zealand
- Samoa
- Tahiti
- Tonga

== Group phase ==
In this round, the teams played in three groups of three. The top three seeded teams played in Group A; the other six teams were drawn into groups B and C. The best team from Group A advanced directly to the semifinals; the second and third team from Group A along with the best four teams from groups B and C advanced to the quarterfinals.

All times are local (Australian Eastern Daylight Saving Time – UTC+11).

=== Group A ===
Pos	Team	Pld	W	L	PF	PA	PD	Pts	Qualification
1	Australia (H)	2	2	0	203	165	+38	4	Semifinals
2	New Zealand	2	1	1	195	162	+33	3	Quarterfinals
3	Samoa	2	0	2	154	225	−71	2	Quarterfinals

Source: FIBA
(H) Hosts

11 November 2024
9:00

Boxscore

Samoa	70–114	New Zealand
Scoring by quarter: 18–32, 24–26, 11–35, 17–21

AIS Arena, Canberra

12 November 2024
19:00

Boxscore

New Zealand	81–92 (OT)	Australia
Scoring by quarter: 22–15, 18–23, 13–20, 18–13, Overtime: 10–21

AIS Arena, Canberra

13 November 2024
19:00

Boxscore

Australia	111–84	Samoa
Scoring by quarter: 27–21, 21–18, 28–21, 35–24

AIS Arena, Canberra

=== Group B ===
Pos	Team	Pld	W	L	PF	PA	PD	Pts	Qualification
1	Fiji	2	2	0	173	158	+15	4	Quarterfinals
2	Guam	2	1	1	164	165	−1	3	Quarterfinals
3	Cook Islands	2	0	2	156	170	−14	2	8th place match

Source: FIBA

11 November 2024
14:00

Boxscore

Guam	82–80	Cook Islands
Scoring by quarter: 23–20, 21–19, 9–20, 29–21

AIS Arena, Canberra

12 November 2024
9:00

Boxscore

Fiji	85–82	Guam
Scoring by quarter: 26–17, 14–18, 21–19, 24–28

AIS Arena, Canberra

13 November 2024
19:30

Boxscore

Cook Islands	76–88	Fiji
Scoring by quarter: 22–24, 14–25, 21–22, 19–17

AIS Basketball Hall, Canberra

=== Group C ===
Pos	Team	Pld	W	L	PF	PA	PD	Pts	Qualification
1	Tonga	2	2	0	190	119	+71	4	Quarterfinals
2	Tahiti	2	1	1	117	140	−23	3	Quarterfinals
3	New Caledonia	2	0	2	123	171	−48	2	8th place match

Source: FIBA

11 November 2024
16:30

Boxscore

Tonga	86–50	Tahiti
Scoring by quarter: 16–6, 14–16, 24–14, 32–14

AIS Arena, Canberra

12 November 2024
11:30

Boxscore

New Caledonia	69–104	Tonga
Scoring by quarter: 13–23, 22–31, 22–22, 12–28

AIS Arena, Canberra

13 November 2024
17:00

Boxscore

Tahiti	67–54	New Caledonia
Scoring by quarter: 13–17, 28–14, 9–12, 17–11

AIS Basketball Hall, Canberra

== Playoffs ==
Quarterfinals
B1	Fiji	56
A3	Samoa	115
A2	New Zealand	133
C2	Tahiti	33
C1	Tonga	104
B2	Guam	71

Semifinals
A1	Australia	107
A3	Samoa	69
A2	New Zealand	114
C1	Tonga	78

Final
A1	Australia	96
A2	New Zealand	68
3rd place match
A3	Samoa	113
C1	Tonga	76

5th–7th place semifinal			5th place match
C2	Tahiti	64
B1	Fiji	63	C2	Tahiti	65
			B2	Guam	78

8th place match
B3	Cook Islands	94
A3	New Caledonia	73

=== 8th place match ===
14 November 2024
12:45

Boxscore

Cook Islands	94–73	New Caledonia
Scoring by quarter: 28–15, 24–18, 21–18, 21–22

AIS Basketball Hall, Canberra

=== Quarterfinals ===
14 November 2024
15:00

Boxscore

New Zealand	133–33	Tahiti
Scoring by quarter: 33–11, 32–7, 32–6, 36–9

AIS Basketball Hall, Canberra

14 November 2024
17:15

Boxscore

Tonga	104–71	Guam
Scoring by quarter: 22–17, 22–18, 31–16, 29–20

AIS Basketball Hall, Canberra

14 November 2024
19:30

Boxscore

Fiji	56–115	Samoa
Scoring by quarter: 19–34, 10–33, 13–21, 14–27

AIS Basketball Hall, Canberra

=== 5th–7th place semifinal ===
15 November 2024
17:00

Boxscore

Tahiti	64–63	Fiji
Scoring by quarter: 14–10, 16–11, 11–22, 23–20

AIS Basketball Hall, Canberra

=== 5th place match ===
16 November 2024
11:30

Boxscore

Tahiti	65–78	Guam
Scoring by quarter: 8–25, 13–14, 15–22, 29–17

AIS Basketball Hall, Canberra

=== Semifinals ===
15 November 2024
16:30

Boxscore

New Zealand	114–78	Tonga
Scoring by quarter: 23–18, 33–30, 27–12, 31–18

AIS Arena, Canberra

15 November 2024
19:00

Boxscore

Australia	107–69	Samoa
Scoring by quarter: 25–19, 29–21, 29–13, 24–16

AIS Arena, Canberra

=== 3rd place match ===
16 November 2024
14:30

Boxscore

Samoa	113–76	Tonga
Scoring by quarter: 30–24, 25–12, 26–23, 32–17

AIS Arena, Canberra

=== Final ===
16 November 2024
17:00

Boxscore

Australia	96–68	New Zealand
Scoring by quarter: 20–10, 30–13, 21–15, 25–30

AIS Arena, Canberra

== Final standings ==
Rank	Team
1st place, gold medalist(s)	Australia
2nd place, silver medalist(s)	New Zealand
3rd place, bronze medalist(s)	Samoa
4	Tonga
5	Guam
6	Tahiti
7	Fiji
8	Cook Islands
9	New Caledonia

Qualified for the 2025 FIBA U16 Asia Cup
