= Samoa men's national under-15 basketball team =

Youth national basketball team

Samoa
- Joined FIBA: 1982
- FIBA zone: FIBA Oceania
- National federation: Samoa Basketball Association

U17 World Cup
- Appearances: None

U16 Asia Cup
- Appearances: None

U15 Oceania Cup
- Appearances: 3
- Medals: (bronze) Bronze: 2 (2018, 2024)

The Samoa men's national under-15 basketball team is the boys' national basketball team of Samoa, governed by Samoa Basketball Association. It represents the country in international under-15 men's basketball competitions.

== FIBA U15 Oceania Cup participations ==
Year	Result
2018	3rd place, bronze medalist(s)
2022	4th
2024	3rd place, bronze medalist(s)

== See also ==
- Samoa men's national basketball team
- Samoa men's national under-17 and under-18 basketball team
- Samoa women's national under-15 and under-16 basketball team
