= 2015 FIBA Oceania Under-16 Championship for Women =

International youth basketball tournament

Tournament details
- Host country: New Zealand
- City: Rotorua, Tauranga
- Dates: 14–17 August 2015
- Teams: 4 (from 1 confederation)
- Venue: 1 (in 1 host city)

Final positions
- Champions: Australia (4th title)
- Runners-up: New Zealand
- Third place: Tahiti

Official website
- www.fiba.basketball/history

The 2015 FIBA Oceania Under-16 Championship for Women was the fourth edition of the under-16 women's Oceanian basketball championship. The tournament was played in Rotorua and Tauranga, New Zealand, from 14 to 17 August 2015.

== Participating teams ==
- Australia
- New Caledonia
- New Zealand
- Tahiti

== Group phase ==
In this round, the teams played a round-robin tournament in one group. The top two teams advanced to the final; the next two teams advanced to the 3rd place match.

All times are local (New Zealand Standard Time – UTC+12).

Pos	Team	Pld	W	L	PF	PA	PD	Pts	Qualification
1	Australia	3	3	0	349	87	+262	6	Final
2	New Zealand (H)	3	2	1	281	163	+118	5	Final
3	Tahiti	3	1	2	122	311	−189	4	3rd place match
4	New Caledonia	3	0	3	115	306	−191	3	3rd place match

Source: FIBA
(H) Hosts

14 August 2015
19:00

Boxscore

New Caledonia	16–132	Australia
Scoring by quarter: –, –, –, –

14 August 2015
21:00

Boxscore

New Zealand	117–41	Tahiti
Scoring by quarter: 34–17, 19–11, 31–9, 33–4

15 August 2015
19:00

Boxscore

Australia	84–54	New Zealand
Scoring by quarter: 24–9, 20–14, 23–13, 17–18

15 August 2015
21:00

Boxscore

Tahiti	64–61	New Caledonia
Scoring by quarter: 11–16, 10–12, 27–15, 16–18

16 August 2015
19:00

Boxscore

New Zealand	110–38	New Caledonia
Scoring by quarter: 25–10, 29–11, 29–2, 27–15

16 August 2015
21:00

Boxscore

Tahiti	17–133	Australia
Scoring by quarter: 4–33, 8–25, 0–40, 5–35

== Playoffs ==
=== 3rd place match ===
17 August 2015
16:00

Boxscore

Tahiti	59–44	New Caledonia
Scoring by quarter: 2–12, 15–12, 19–8, 23–12

=== Final ===
17 August 2015
18:30

Boxscore

Australia	75–54	New Zealand
Scoring by quarter: 16–11, 11–14, 21–22, 27–7

== Final standings ==
Rank	Team
1st place, gold medalist(s)	Australia
2nd place, silver medalist(s)	New Zealand
3rd place, bronze medalist(s)	Tahiti
4	New Caledonia

Qualified for the 2016 FIBA Under-17 World Championship for Women
