= New Zealand men's national under-17 basketball team =

New Zealand
- Joined FIBA: 1951
- FIBA zone: FIBA Asia
- National federation: Basketball New Zealand
- Coach: Darron Larsen

U17 World Cup
- Appearances: 4

U16 Asia Cup
- Appearances: 4
- Medals: (silver) Silver: (2023); (bronze) Bronze: (2017, 2022, 2025)

U15/U16 Oceania Cup
- Appearances: 7
- Medals: (silver) Silver: (2009, 2011, 2013, 2015, 2018, 2022, 2024)

The New Zealand men's national under-15, under-16 and under-17 basketball team is the boys' national basketball team of New Zealand, governed by Basketball New Zealand. It represents the country in international under-15, under-16 and under-17 men's basketball competitions.

The team is nicknamed the Junior Tall Blacks.

== Tournament record ==
=== U17 World Cup ===
Year	Pos.	Pld	W	L
(Germany) 2010	Did not qualify			
(Lithuania) 2012	Did not qualify			
(United Arab Emirates) 2014	Did not qualify			
(Spain) 2016	Did not qualify			
(Argentina) 2018	14th	7	1	6
(Spain) 2022	12th	7	1	6
(Turkey) 2024	4th	7	4	3
(Turkey) 2026	12th	7	2	5
(Greece) 2028	To be determined			
Total	4/9	28	8	20

=== U16 Asia Cup ===
Year	Result
2017	3rd place, bronze medalist(s)
2022	3rd place, bronze medalist(s)
2023	2nd place, silver medalist(s)
2025	3rd place, bronze medalist(s)

=== U15/U16 Oceania Cup ===
Year	Result
2009	2nd place, silver medalist(s)
2011	2nd place, silver medalist(s)
2013	2nd place, silver medalist(s)
2015	2nd place, silver medalist(s)
2018	2nd place, silver medalist(s)
2022	2nd place, silver medalist(s)
2024	2nd place, silver medalist(s)

== See also ==
- New Zealand men's national basketball team
- New Zealand men's national under-19 basketball team
- New Zealand women's national under-17 basketball team
