= Tahiti men's national under-15 basketball team =

Tahiti
- FIBA zone: FIBA Oceania
- National federation: Fédération Tahitienne de Basketball

U17 World Cup
- Appearances: None

U16 Asia Cup
- Appearances: None

U15/U16 Oceania Cup
- Appearances: 2
- Medals: (bronze) Bronze: 1 (2015)

The Tahiti men's national under-15 basketball team is a national basketball team of Tahiti, administered by the Fédération Tahitienne de Basketball. It represents the country in international under-15 men's basketball competitions.

== FIBA U15 Oceania Cup participations ==
Year	Result
2015	5th
2024	6th

== See also ==
- Tahiti men's national basketball team
