= Samoa women's national under-15 and under-16 basketball team =

Samoa
- FIBA zone: FIBA Oceania
- National federation: Samoa Basketball Association

U17 World Cup
- Appearances: None

U16 Asia Cup
- Appearances: 1
- Medals: None

U16 Asia Cup Division B
- Appearances: 2
- Medals: (gold) Gold: 1 (2022)

U15 Oceania Cup
- Appearances: 3
- Medals: (bronze) Bronze: 2 (2018, 2022)

The Samoa women's national under-15 and under-16 basketball team is a national basketball team of Samoa, administered by the Samoa Basketball Association. It represents the country in women's international under-15 and under-16 basketball competitions.

== FIBA U15 Women's Oceania Cup participations ==
Year	Result
2018	3rd place, bronze medalist(s)
2022	3rd place, bronze medalist(s)
2024	4th

== FIBA Under-16 Women's Asia Cup participations ==
Year	Division A	Division B
2022	—N/a	1st place, gold medalist(s)
2023	7th	—N/a
2025	—N/a	8th

== See also ==
- Samoa women's national under-17 and under-18 basketball team
- Samoa men's national under-15 basketball team
