= 2018 FIBA Under-15 Oceania Championship =

International youth basketball tournament

Tournament details
- Host country: Papua New Guinea
- City: Port Moresby
- Dates: 4–8 December 2018
- Teams: 6 (from 1 confederation)
- Venue: 1 (in 1 host city)

Final positions
- Champions: Australia (5th title)
- Runners-up: New Zealand
- Third place: Samoa

Official website
- www.fiba.basketball/history

The 2018 FIBA Under-15 Oceania Championship was the fifth edition of the FIBA Oceania Under-15 Championship. The tournament was played in Port Moresby, Papua New Guinea, from 4 to 8 December 2018.

== Participating teams ==
- Australia
- Fiji
- Guam
- New Zealand
- Papua New Guinea
- Samoa

== Group phase ==
In this round, the teams played a round-robin tournament in one group. The top two teams advanced to the final; the next two teams advanced to the 3rd place match; the bottom two teams advanced to the 5th place match.

All times are local (Papua New Guinea Standard Time – UTC+10).

Pos	Team	Pld	W	L	PF	PA	PD	Pts	Qualification
1	New Zealand	5	5	0	563	239	+324	10	Final
2	Australia	5	4	1	500	196	+304	9	Final
3	Samoa	5	3	2	421	388	+33	8	3rd place match
4	Guam	5	2	3	299	440	−141	7	3rd place match
5	Fiji	5	1	4	227	461	−234	6	5th place match
6	Papua New Guinea (H)	5	0	5	276	562	−286	5	5th place match

Source: FIBA
(H) Hosts

4 December 2018
15:00

Boxscore

Guam	41–131	New Zealand
Scoring by quarter: 10–26, 17–37, 8–33, 6–35

TAIC, Port Moresby

4 December 2018
16:00

Boxscore

Australia	90–49	Samoa
Scoring by quarter: 22–16, 21–25, 17–4, 30–4

TAIC, Port Moresby

4 December 2018
19:00

Boxscore

Papua New Guinea	62–64	Fiji
Scoring by quarter: 20–21, 17–10, 11–19, 14–14

TAIC, Port Moresby

5 December 2018
10:00

Boxscore

Samoa	85–63	Guam
Scoring by quarter: 15–10, 22–16, 25–19, 23–18

TAIC, Port Moresby

5 December 2018
11:00

Boxscore

New Zealand	163–51	Papua New Guinea
Scoring by quarter: 41–14, 42–9, 40–12, 40–16

TAIC, Port Moresby

5 December 2018
12:00

Boxscore

Fiji	27–119	Australia
Scoring by quarter: 2–41, 7–34, 10–30, 8–14

TAIC, Port Moresby

5 December 2018
17:00

Boxscore

Guam	30–113	Australia
Scoring by quarter: 7–31, 12–25, 4–29, 7–28

TAIC, Port Moresby

5 December 2018
18:00

Boxscore

New Zealand	105–27	Fiji
Scoring by quarter: 35–7, 23–4, 24–10, 23–6

TAIC, Port Moresby

5 December 2018
19:00

Boxscore

Papua New Guinea	72–128	Samoa
Scoring by quarter: 15–35, 20–36, 17–31, 20–26

TAIC, Port Moresby

6 December 2018
12:00

Boxscore

Fiji	58–96	Samoa
Scoring by quarter: 11–27, 22–21, 15–18, 10–30

TAIC, Port Moresby

6 December 2018
13:00

Boxscore

Papua New Guinea	60–86	Guam
Scoring by quarter: 11–25, 20–19, 22–18, 7–24

TAIC, Port Moresby

6 December 2018
15:00

Boxscore

Australia	57–59	New Zealand
Scoring by quarter: 11–13, 12–19, 21–10, 13–17

TAIC, Port Moresby

7 December 2018
13:00

Boxscore

Guam	79–51	Fiji
Scoring by quarter: 24–8, 22–10, 22–16, 11–17

TAIC, Port Moresby

7 December 2018
15:00

Boxscore

Samoa	63–105	New Zealand
Scoring by quarter: 19–28, 19–32, 10–24, 15–21

TAIC, Port Moresby

7 December 2018
19:00

Boxscore

Australia	121–31	Papua New Guinea
Scoring by quarter: 29–8, 30–13, 31–6, 31–4

TAIC, Port Moresby

== Playoffs ==
=== 5th place match ===
8 December 2018
11:00

Boxscore

Fiji	52–65	Papua New Guinea
Scoring by quarter: 19–12, 11–18, 6–11, 16–24

TAIC, Port Moresby

=== 3rd place match ===
8 December 2018
15:00

Boxscore

Samoa	74–52	Guam
Scoring by quarter: 11–20, 18–9, 22–6, 23–17

TAIC, Port Moresby

=== Final ===
8 December 2018
19:00

Boxscore

New Zealand	58–61	Australia
Scoring by quarter: 12–7, 27–18, 14–19, 5–17

TAIC, Port Moresby

== Final standings ==
Rank	Team
1st place, gold medalist(s)	Australia
2nd place, silver medalist(s)	New Zealand
3rd place, bronze medalist(s)	Samoa
4	Guam
5	Papua New Guinea
6	Fiji
