= 2024 FIBA U15 Women's Oceania Cup =

International youth basketball tournament

Tournament details
- Host country: Australia
- City: Canberra
- Dates: 11–16 November 2024
- Teams: 8 (from 1 confederation)
- Venues: 2 (in 1 host city)

Final positions
- Champions: Australia (7th title)
- Runners-up: New Zealand
- Third place: Tonga

Official website
- www.fiba.basketball

The 2024 FIBA U15 Women's Oceania Cup was the seventh edition of the FIBA U15 Women's Oceania Cup. The tournament was played in Canberra, Australia, from 11 to 16 November 2024. Australia became the Oceanian champions for the seventh consecutive time.

== Participating teams ==
- Australia
- Cook Islands
- Fiji
- Guam
- New Caledonia
- New Zealand
- Samoa
- Tonga

== Group phase ==
In this round, the teams were assigned to two groups of four. The top four seeded teams played in Group A; the other teams in Group B. The best two teams from Group A advanced directly to the semifinals; the third and fourth team from Group A along with the best two teams from Group B advanced to the quarterfinals.

All times are local (Australian Eastern Daylight Saving Time – UTC+11).

=== Group A ===
Pos	Team	Pld	W	L	PF	PA	PD	Pts	Qualification
1	Australia (H)	3	3	0	288	129	+159	6	Semifinals
2	New Zealand	3	2	1	302	163	+139	5	Semifinals
3	Samoa	3	1	2	172	229	−57	4	Quarterfinals
4	Guam	3	0	3	127	368	−241	3	Quarterfinals

Source: FIBA
(H) Hosts

11 November 2024
11:30

Boxscore

New Zealand	82–45	Samoa
Scoring by quarter: 20–13, 22–6, 25–13, 15–13

AIS Arena, Canberra

11 November 2024
19:30

Boxscore

Australia	123–27	Guam
Scoring by quarter: 30–0, 33–9, 30–10, 30–8

AIS Arena, Canberra

12 November 2024
14:00

Boxscore

Samoa	34–94	Australia
Scoring by quarter: 5–28, 7–18, 8–14, 14–34

AIS Arena, Canberra

12 November 2024
19:30

Boxscore

Guam	47–152	New Zealand
Scoring by quarter: 11–40, 8–35, 7–39, 21–38

AIS Basketball Hall, Canberra

13 November 2024
11:30

Boxscore

Samoa	93–53	Guam
Scoring by quarter: 19–16, 28–15, 20–11, 26–11

AIS Arena, Canberra

13 November 2024
16:30

Boxscore

New Zealand	68–71	Australia
Scoring by quarter: 19–17, 27–15, 6–26, 16–13

AIS Arena, Canberra

=== Group B ===
Pos	Team	Pld	W	L	PF	PA	PD	Pts	Qualification
1	Tonga	3	3	0	289	147	+142	6	Quarterfinals
2	New Caledonia	3	2	1	203	206	−3	5	Quarterfinals
3	Fiji	3	1	2	187	196	−9	4	7th place match
4	Cook Islands	3	0	3	149	279	−130	3	7th place match

Source: FIBA

11 November 2024
17:00

Boxscore

Cook Islands	45–61	Fiji
Scoring by quarter: 13–15, 10–23, 6–11, 16–12

AIS Basketball Hall, Canberra

11 November 2024
19:30

Boxscore

Tonga	80–43	New Caledonia
Scoring by quarter: 15–15, 14–7, 29–12, 22–9

AIS Basketball Hall, Canberra

12 November 2024
16:30

Boxscore

Fiji	52–76	Tonga
Scoring by quarter: 17–23, 11–13, 11–22, 13–18

AIS Arena, Canberra

12 November 2024
17:00

Boxscore

New Caledonia	85–52	Cook Islands
Scoring by quarter: 14–15, 28–16, 20–13, 23–8

AIS Basketball Hall, Canberra

13 November 2024
9:00

Boxscore

Tonga	133–52	Cook Islands
Scoring by quarter: 25–14, 41–15, 20–9, 47–14

AIS Arena, Canberra

13 November 2024
14:00

Boxscore

Fiji	74–75 (OT)	New Caledonia
Scoring by quarter: 13–12, 17–15, 10–22, 22–13, Overtime: 12–13

AIS Arena, Canberra

== Playoffs ==
Quarterfinals
A4	Guam	64
B1	Tonga	89
A3	Samoa	90
B2	New Caledonia	37

Semifinals
A1	Australia	119
B1	Tonga	20
A2	New Zealand	88
A3	Samoa	40

Final
A1	Australia	93
A2	New Zealand	44
3rd place match
B1	Tonga	75
A3	Samoa	68

5th place match
B2	New Caledonia	57
A4	Guam	77

7th place match
B3	Fiji	50
B4	Cook Islands	32

=== Quarterfinals ===
14 November 2024
12:30

Boxscore

Samoa	90–37	New Caledonia
Scoring by quarter: 22–7, 21–14, 24–4, 23–12

AIS Arena, Canberra

14 November 2024
14:30

Boxscore

Guam	64–89	Tonga
Scoring by quarter: 12–18, 19–20, 24–26, 9–25

AIS Arena, Canberra

=== Semifinals ===
15 November 2024
11:30

Boxscore

New Zealand	88–40	Samoa
Scoring by quarter: 25–7, 20–15, 19–7, 24–11

AIS Arena, Canberra

15 November 2024
14:00

Boxscore

Australia	119–20	Tonga
Scoring by quarter: 31–8, 29–1, 21–8, 38–3

AIS Arena, Canberra

=== 7th place match ===
15 November 2024
19:30

Boxscore

Fiji	50–32	Cook Islands
Scoring by quarter: 10–5, 15–16, 13–5, 12–6

AIS Basketball Hall, Canberra

=== 5th place match ===
15 November 2024
9:00

Boxscore

New Caledonia	57–77	Guam
Scoring by quarter: 11–22, 14–12, 12–30, 20–13

AIS Arena, Canberra

=== 3rd place match ===
16 November 2024
12:00

Boxscore

Tonga	75–68	Samoa
Scoring by quarter: 5–14, 23–25, 26–12, 21–17

AIS Arena, Canberra

=== Final ===
16 November 2024
19:30

Boxscore

Australia	93–44	New Zealand
Scoring by quarter: 26–15, 17–7, 30–10, 20–12

AIS Arena, Canberra

== Final standings ==
Rank	Team
1st place, gold medalist(s)	Australia
2nd place, silver medalist(s)	New Zealand
3rd place, bronze medalist(s)	Tonga
4	Samoa
5	Guam
6	New Caledonia
7	Fiji
8	Cook Islands
