= FIBA U15 Women's Oceania Cup =

Under-15 continental basketball championship

- Most recent season or competition: 2024 FIBA U15 Women's Oceania Cup
- Sport: Basketball
- Founded: 2009; 17 years ago
- Organizing body: FIBA Oceania
- No. of teams: 4–8
- Continent: Oceania
- Most recent champion: Australia (7th title)
- Most titles: Australia (7 titles)
- Qualification: FIBA U16 Women's Asia Cup
- Related competitions: FIBA U17 Women's Oceania Cup
- Website: www.fiba.basketball/history

The FIBA U15 Women's Oceania Cup, formerly known as the FIBA Under-15 Women's Oceania Championship, is an international girls' basketball tournament in the FIBA Oceania zone, inaugurated in 2009. The current champions are Australia.

Before 2018, the competition was known as the FIBA Oceania Under-16 Championship for Women, which was a qualifier for the FIBA U17 Women's World Cup. Now it is an under-15 competition for Oceanian teams to qualify for the FIBA U16 Women's Asia Cup (from which they can qualify for the World Cup).

== Summary ==
=== Under-16 era ===
Year	Hosts	Final			Third place match		
Year	Hosts	Champions	Score	Runners-up	Third place	Score	Fourth place
2009; Details	(Australia); Brisbane	Australia	3–0	New Zealand	No other teams competed		
2011; Details	(Australia); Canberra	Australia	3–0	New Zealand	No other teams competed		
2013; Details	(Australia); Melbourne	Australia	3–0	New Zealand	No other teams competed		
2015; Details	(New Zealand); Rotorua / Tauranga	Australia	75–54	New Zealand	Tahiti	59–44	New Caledonia

=== Under-15 era ===
Year	Hosts	Final			Third place match		
Year	Hosts	Champions	Score	Runners-up	Third place	Score	Fourth place
2018; Details	(Papua New Guinea); Port Moresby	Australia	110–30	New Zealand	Samoa	80–41	Fiji
2020	Cancelled due to COVID-19 pandemic in Oceania						
2022; Details	(Guam); Mangilao	Australia	100–54	New Zealand	Samoa	92–50	Guam
2024; Details	(Australia); Canberra	Australia	93–44	New Zealand	Tonga	75–68	Samoa
2026; Details	(New Zealand); Auckland		–			–	

== Medal table ==
Rank	Nation	Gold	Silver	Bronze	Total
1	Australia	7	0	0	7
2	New Zealand	0	7	0	7
3	Samoa	0	0	2	2
4	Tahiti	0	0	1	1
4	Tonga	0	0	1	1
Totals (5 entries)		7	7	4	18

== Participation details ==
Team	(Australia) 2009	(Australia) 2011	(Australia) 2013	(New Zealand) 2015	(Papua New Guinea) 2018	(Guam) 2022	(Australia) 2024	(New Zealand) 2026	Total
Australia	1st	1st	1st	1st	1st	1st	1st	Q	8
Cook Islands							8th	Q	2
Fiji					4th		7th	Q	3
Guam						4th	5th	Q	3
New Caledonia				4th			6th		2
Northern Mariana Islands						6th			1
New Zealand	2nd	2nd	2nd	2nd	2nd	2nd	2nd	Q	8
Papua New Guinea					5th	5th			2
Samoa					3rd	3rd	4th	Q	4
Tahiti				3rd					1
Tonga							3rd	Q	2
Total	2	2	2	4	5	6	8	7	
