= 2015 FIBA Under-16 Oceania Championship =

International youth basketball tournament

Tournament details
- Host country: New Zealand
- City: Wellington
- Dates: 15–18 August 2015
- Teams: 4 (from 1 confederation)
- Venues: 2 (in 1 host city)

Final positions
- Champions: Australia (4th title)
- Runners-up: New Zealand
- Third place: Tahiti

Official website
- www.fiba.basketball/history

The 2015 FIBA Oceania Under-16 Championship was an international under-16 basketball tournament staged in August 2015 by FIBA Oceania. This was the fourth edition of the FIBA Oceania Under-16 Championship. The teams taking part represented Australia, New Caledonia, New Zealand and Tahiti. The venues were St. Patrick's College and TSB Bank Arena in Wellington, New Zealand. The winning team was Australia.

== Group phase ==
Pos	Team	Pld	W	L	PF	PA	PD	Pts	Qualification
1	New Zealand (H)	3	3	0	348	136	+212	6	Final
2	Australia	3	2	1	311	143	+168	5	Final
3	New Caledonia	3	1	2	127	342	−215	4	Bronze medal game
4	Tahiti	3	0	3	127	292	−165	3	Bronze medal game

Source: FIBA
(H) Hosts

15 August 2015
17:00

Boxscore

New Caledonia	36–145	New Zealand
Scoring by quarter: 4-43, 13-32, 7-33, 12-37
Pts: Fenuafanote 18; Rebs: Fenuafanote 5 Asts: Tapii 2		Pts: Fotu 23; Rebs: McRae 12; Asts: Clinton 6

St Patricks College, Wellington (NZL)

15 August 2015
19:00

Boxscore

Australia	108–33	Tahiti
Scoring by quarter: 20-4, 33-5, 29-4, 26-20
Pts: Froling 20; Rebs: Froling 14; Asts: Froling 6		Pts: Voirin 12; Rebs: Voirin 4 Asts: 4 players 1

St Patricks College, Wellington (NZL)

16 August 2015
17:00

Boxscore

New Zealand	81–62	Australia
Scoring by quarter: 19-13, 18-22, 14-15, 30-12
Pts: Clinton 18; Rebs: Samuel 10; Asts: Clinton 4		Pts: Bines 12; Rebs: Froling 10; Asts: Dent 3

St Patricks College, Wellington (NZL)

16 August 2015
19:00

Boxscore

Tahiti	56–62	New Caledonia
Scoring by quarter: 13-24, 5-13, 19-13, 19-12
Pts: Voirin 16; Rebs: Jean-Ernest 10; Asts: Nanni 2		Pts: Ixoee, Laloine, Dabin 10; Rebs: Tessier 15; Asts: Fenuafanote 4

St Patricks College, Wellington (NZL)

17 August 2015
17:00

Boxscore

New Caledonia	29–141	Australia
Scoring by quarter: 6-40, 9-40, 7-28, 7-33
Pts: Fenuafanote 13; Rebs: Fenuafanote, Ixoee 4 Asts: Dabin 2		Pts: Bines 21; Rebs: Griffiths 12; Asts: Dent 7

St Patricks College, Wellington (NZL)

17 August 2015
19:00

Boxscore

New Zealand	122–38	Tahiti
Scoring by quarter: 37-11, 32-6, 24-9, 29-12
Pts: Jakszt 22; Rebs: McRae 17; Asts: 3 players 5		Pts: Teamotuaitau 17; Rebs: Teore 3 Asts: Nanni 2

St Patricks College, Wellington (NZL)

== Playoffs ==
=== Bronze medal game ===
18 August 2015
14:00

Boxscore

New Caledonia	56–79	Tahiti
Scoring by quarter: 7-22, 18-15, 19-14, 12-28
Pts: Dabin 15; Rebs: Tessier 21; Asts: Fenuafanote 3		Pts: Teamotuaitau, Jean-Ernest 15; Rebs: Lacour 13; Asts: Richmond 4

TSB Bank Arena, Wellington (NZL)

=== Final ===
18 August 2015
16:30

Boxscore

New Zealand	86–91	Australia
Scoring by quarter: 18-20, 14-22, 24-22, 30-27
Pts: Clinton 28; Rebs: Waardenburg 10; Asts: Clinton 4		Pts: Elkaz 20; Rebs: Froling, Johns 8 Asts: Dent 5

TSB Bank Arena, Wellington (NZL)

== Final standings ==
Rank	Team
1st place, gold medalist(s)	Australia
2nd place, silver medalist(s)	New Zealand
3rd place, bronze medalist(s)	Tahiti
4	New Caledonia
