= Ricor Buaron =

Filipino basketball referee

Ricor Buaron (born August 30, 1970) is a Filipino basketball referee. He began officiating FIBA-sanctioned basketball games on September 26, 2008. Buaron has officiated in various international competitions, including the 2013 FIBA Under-19 World Championship, and 2015 FIBA Asia Championship.

Buaron also was a former referee at the UAAP games, where he first officiated in 2000. He also served as a referee for UNTV Cup.
