= Australia men's national under-17 basketball team =

Australia
- Joined FIBA: 1947
- National federation: Basketball Australia
- Coach: Greg Vanderjagt
- Nickname: Crocs

U17 World Cup
- Appearances: 8
- Medals: (silver) Silver: (2012, 2014); (bronze) Bronze: (2026)

U16 Asia Cup
- Appearances: 4
- Medals: (gold) Gold: (2017, 2022, 2023, 2025)

U15 Oceania Cup
- Appearances: 7
- Medals: (gold) Gold: (2009, 2011, 2013, 2015, 2018, 2022, 2024)
Home	Away

The Australia men's national under-15, under-16 and under-17 basketball team, nicknamed the Crocs, is the junior boys' basketball side that represents Australia in international under-15, under-16 and under-17 men's basketball competitions. The team is governed by the Australian Basketball Federation Inc.

Their greatest accomplishments were finishing as silver medalists at two FIBA Under-17 Basketball World Cups.

== Competitive record ==
=== U17 World Cup ===
Year	Pos.	Pld	W	L
(Germany) 2010	6th	8	4	4
(Lithuania) 2012	2nd	8	6	2
(United Arab Emirates) 2014	2nd	7	5	2
(Spain) 2016	7th	7	3	4
(Argentina) 2018	6th	7	4	3
(Spain) 2022	6th	7	5	2
(Turkey) 2024	15th	7	4	3
(Turkey) 2026	3rd	7	6	1
(Greece) 2028	To be determined			
Total	8/9	51	37	21

=== U16 Asia Cup ===
Year	Result
2017	1st place, gold medalist(s)
2022	1st place, gold medalist(s)
2023	1st place, gold medalist(s)
2025	1st place, gold medalist(s)

=== U15/U16 Oceania Cup ===
Year	Result
2009	1st place, gold medalist(s)
2011	1st place, gold medalist(s)
2013	1st place, gold medalist(s)
2015	1st place, gold medalist(s)
2018	1st place, gold medalist(s)
2022	1st place, gold medalist(s)
2024	1st place, gold medalist(s)

== See also ==
- Australia men's national basketball team
- Australia men's national under-19 basketball team
- Australia women's national under-17 basketball team
