= Papua New Guinea women's national under-15 basketball team =

Papua New Guinea
- FIBA zone: FIBA Oceania
- National federation: Basketball Federation of Papua New Guinea

U17 World Cup
- Appearances: None

U16 Asia Cup
- Appearances: None

U15 Oceania Cup
- Appearances: 2
- Medals: None

The Papua New Guinea women's national under-15 basketball team is a national basketball team of Papua New Guinea, administered by the Basketball Federation of Papua New Guinea. It represents the country in women's international under-15 basketball competitions.

== FIBA U15 Women's Oceania Cup participations ==
| Year | Result |
|---|---|
| 2018 | 5th |
| 2022 | 5th |

== See also ==
- Papua New Guinea women's national basketball team
- Papua New Guinea women's national under-18 basketball team
