= Australia women's national under-17 basketball team =

Australia
- Joined FIBA: 1947
- FIBA zone: FIBA Asia
- National federation: Basketball Australia
- Coach: Tom Garlepp

U17 World Cup
- Appearances: 8
- Medals: (gold) Gold: (2016); (bronze) Bronze: (2018)

U16 Asia Cup
- Appearances: 3
- Medals: (gold) Gold: (2017, 2022, 2023)

U15/U16 Oceania Cup
- Appearances: 7
- Medals: (gold) Gold: (2009, 2011, 2013, 2015, 2018, 2022, 2024)
Medal record
U17 World Cup
| Gold medal – first place | 2016 Zaragoza |
| Bronze medal – third place | 2018 Minsk |
| Bronze medal – third place | 2026 Brno |
U16 Asia Cup
| Gold medal – first place | 2017 Bangalore |
| Gold medal – first place | 2022 Amman |
| Gold medal – first place | 2023 Amman |
U15 Oceania Cup
| Gold medal – first place | 2009 Brisbane |
| Gold medal – first place | 2011 Canberra |
| Gold medal – first place | 2013 Melbourne |
| Gold medal – first place | 2015 Rotorua/Tauranga |
| Gold medal – first place | 2018 Port Moresby |
| Gold medal – first place | 2022 Mangilao |
| Gold medal – first place | 2024 Canberra |

The Australia women's national under-15, under-16 and under-17 basketball team is a national basketball team of Australia, governed by the Australian Basketball Federation Inc. Nicknamed the Sapphires, the team represents the country in international under-15, under-16 and under-17 women's basketball competitions.

== Tournament record ==
=== U17 World Cup ===
Australia participated in the inaugural FIBA Under-17 World Championship in 2010 in France. They have appeared in every edition since.

World Cup
| Year | Round | Position | Pld | W | L | Coach |
|---|---|---|---|---|---|---|
| (France) 2010 | Quarterfinals | 7th of 12 | 7 | 4 | 3 | Lonergan |
| (Netherlands) 2012 | Quarterfinals | 5th of 12 | 8 | 5 | 3 | Fillipou |
| (Czech Republic) 2014 | Quarterfinals | 5th of 16 | 7 | 6 | 1 | Lucas |
| (Spain) 2016 | Champions | 1st of 16 | 7 | 7 | 0 | Seebohm |
| (Belarus) 2018 | Third place | 3rd of 16 | 7 | 6 | 1 | Seebohm |
| (Hungary) 2022 | Fifth place | 5th of 16 | 7 | 4 | 3 | York |
| (Mexico) 2024 | Fifth place | 5th of 16 | 7 | 5 | 2 | Martin |
| (Czech Republic) 2026 | Third place | 3rd of 16 | 7 | 5 | 2 | Garlepp |
| (Indonesia) 2028 | To be determined | | | | | |
| Total | 8/9 | | 57 | 42 | 15 | |

=== U16 Asia Cup ===
| Year | Result |
|---|---|
| 2017 | 1st place, gold medalist(s) |
| 2022 | 1st place, gold medalist(s) |
| 2023 | 1st place, gold medalist(s) |

=== U15/U16 Oceania Cup ===
| Year | Result |
|---|---|
| 2009 | 1st place, gold medalist(s) |
| 2011 | 1st place, gold medalist(s) |
| 2013 | 1st place, gold medalist(s) |
| 2015 | 1st place, gold medalist(s) |
| 2018 | 1st place, gold medalist(s) |
| 2022 | 1st place, gold medalist(s) |
| 2024 | 1st place, gold medalist(s) |

== See also ==
- Australia women's national basketball team
- Australia women's national under-19 basketball team
- Australia men's national under-17 basketball team
