= 3x3 basketball at the 2017 Pacific Mini Games =

Pacific Mini Games Basketball Tournament
- Port Vila 2017

Tournament details
- Games: 2017 Pacific Mini Games
- Host nation: Vanuatu
- City: Port Vila
- Duration: 11–14 December

Men's tournament
- Teams: 9
Medals
Gold medalists	Samoa
Silver medalists	Solomon Islands
Bronze medalists	Papua New Guinea

Women's tournament
- Teams: 7
Medals
Gold medalists	Cook Islands
Silver medalists	Papua New Guinea
Bronze medalists	Vanuatu

Official website
- www.van2017.com

3-on-3 basketball at the 2017 Pacific Mini Games was held in Port Vila, Vanuatu on 11–14 December 2017. This was the first time the three-on-three variant was contested at a Pacific Mini Games, although regular basketball tournaments have been played previously.

== Participating nations ==
Nine men's teams and seven women's teams participated:

Men's tournament

- American Samoa
- Cook Islands
- Fiji
- Nauru
- Northern Mariana Islands
- Papua New Guinea
- Samoa
- Solomon Islands
- Vanuatu

Women's tournament

- Cook Islands
- Fiji
- Nauru
- Papua New Guinea
- Samoa
- Solomon Islands
- Vanuatu

== Medal summary ==
=== Medal table ===
Rank	Nation	Gold	Silver	Bronze	Total
1	Cook Islands (COK)	1	0	0	1
1	Samoa (SAM)	1	0	0	1
3	Papua New Guinea (PNG)	0	1	1	2
4	Solomon Islands (SOL)	0	1	0	1
5	Vanuatu (VAN)*	0	0	1	1
Totals (5 entries)		2	2	2	6

=== Medalists ===
Event	Gold	Silver	Bronze
Men's tournament	Samoa; Theodore McFarland; Ezra Tufuga; Ryan Paia; Denzel Joseph	Solomon Islands; Allen Wanefai; Alex Masaea; Augustine Basia; Waige Turueke	Papua New Guinea; Apia Muri; Moses Apiko; Liam Wright
Women's tournament	Cook Islands; Keziah Lewis; Adoniah Lewis; Terai Sadler; Janet Main	Papua New Guinea; Betty Angula; Normalisa Dobunaba; Rosa Kairi; Marca Muri	Vanuatu; Nancy Patterson; Izono Frances; Pauline Malanga; Izono Lola

== See also ==
- Basketball at the Pacific Games
