= FIBA Oceania Youth Tournament =

Basketball tournament

- Sport: Basketball
- Founded: 1997
- Folded: 2010
- No. of teams: FIBA Oceania member nations
- Continent: FIBA Oceania (Oceania)
- Last champion: Australia (2nd title)
- Most titles: New Zealand (4 titles)

The FIBA Oceania Youth Tournament was a men's youth basketball tournament that debuted in 1997 and then took place every two years between 1998 and 2010. It featured under-20 national teams within the Oceania region.

== Summaries ==
Year	Host	Gold medal game			Bronze medal game		
Year	Host	Gold	Score	Silver	Bronze	Score	Fourth place
1997	Fiji	Fiji	57–46	Tahiti	Nauru	67–60	Vanuatu
1998	New Caledonia	New Zealand	70–58	New Caledonia	Australia	72–29	Tahiti
2000	Vanuatu	New Zealand	76–59	Australia	New Caledonia	71–66	Fiji
2002	Tonga	Fiji	86–76	Australia	New Caledonia	105–88	New Zealand
2004	Australia	New Zealand	86–74	Australia	Guam	99–77	Fiji
2006	New Zealand	New Zealand	104–94	Australia	New Caledonia	70–67	Tahiti
2008	Guam	Australia	95–48	Tahiti	Guam	92–60	New Caledonia
2010	New Caledonia	Australia	57–46	New Zealand	New Caledonia	67–33	Guam

== Participating nations ==
Nation	1997	1998	2000	2002	2004	2006	2008	2010	Participations
American Samoa		7th		5th	7th			5th	4
Australia		3rd	2nd	2nd	2nd	2nd	1st	1st	7
Cook Islands						7th			1
Fiji	1st	5th	4th	1st	6th	4th	5th	7th	8
Guam					6th	3rd	3rd	4th	4
Nauru	3rd								1
New Caledonia		2nd	3rd	3rd	3rd	5th	4th	3rd	7
New Zealand		1st	1st	4th	1st	1st		2nd	6
Northern Mariana Islands							6th		1
Palau							8th		1
Papua New Guinea		6th		7th	8th	8th	7th		5
Samoa			5th						1
Tahiti	2nd	4th		6th	4th	6th	2nd	6th	7
Tonga				8th					1
Vanuatu	4th	8th	6th					8th	4

Note: In 1997, also participated the following teams: Fiji 2 (5th place) and Sanma (6th place).
