= Basketball at the 1963 South Pacific Games =

Basketball at the 1963 South Pacific Games was played at Suva in Fiji with 6 teams competing in the men's tournament.

== Medal summary ==
Event	Gold	Silver	Bronze
Men's Basketball	Tahiti	American Samoa	Papua New Guinea

== Men's tournament ==
=== Standings ===
Final standings after the round robin tournament:

Team	Pld	W	L	PF	PA	PD	Pts
Tahiti	6	6	0	465	240	+225	12
American Samoa	6	5	1	323	272	+51	10
Nauru	6	3	3	301	318	-17	6
Papua New Guinea	6	3	3	282	332	-50	6
New Caledonia	6	2	4	274	301	-27	4
Fiji	6	2	4	259	314	-55	4
Western Samoa	6	0	6	230	357	-127	0

=== Matches ===
September 1963

Tahiti	79–45	American Samoa

Suva, Fiji

September 1963

Tahiti	85–50	Nauru

Suva, Fiji

September 1963

Tahiti	75–39	Papua New Guinea

Suva, Fiji

September 1963

Tahiti	61–42	New Caledonia

Suva, Fiji

September 1963

Tahiti	82–32	Fiji

Suva, Fiji

September 1963

Tahiti	83–32	Western Samoa

Suva, Fiji

September 1963

American Samoa	45–40	Nauru

Suva, Fiji

September 1963

American Samoa	65–46	Papua New Guinea

Suva, Fiji

September 1963

American Samoa	58–44	New Caledonia

Suva, Fiji

September 1963

American Samoa	54–37	Fiji

Suva, Fiji

September 1963

American Samoa	56–26	Western Samoa

Suva, Fiji

September 1963

Nauru	61–54	Papua New Guinea

Suva, Fiji

September 1963

Nauru	45–39	New Caledonia

Suva, Fiji

September 1963

Nauru	46–59	Fiji

Suva, Fiji

September 1963

Nauru	59–36	Western Samoa

Suva, Fiji

September 1963

Papua New Guinea	42–40	New Caledonia

Suva, Fiji

September 1963

Papua New Guinea	42–40	Fiji

Suva, Fiji

September 1963

Papua New Guinea	59–51	Western Samoa

Suva, Fiji

September 1963

New Caledonia	54–46	Fiji

Suva, Fiji

September 1963

New Caledonia	55–49	Western Samoa

Suva, Fiji

September 1963

Fiji	45–36	Western Samoa

Suva, Fiji

=== Play-off for bronze medal ===
September 1963

Papua New Guinea	61–54	Nauru

Suva, Fiji

Papua New Guinea defeated Nauru, to win the bronze medal in extra time.

== See also ==
- Basketball at the Pacific Games
