= Basketball at the 2011 Pacific Games =

Basketball – Men's tournament at the 2011 Pan American Games
- Dates: August 29 – September 8

Basketball at the 2011 Pacific Games was held from August 29–September 8, 2011 at several venues.

== Events ==
=== Medal summary ===
Event	Gold	Silver	Bronze
Men	New Caledonia	Guam	Tahiti
Women	Tahiti	New Caledonia	Fiji

== Men ==
=== Preliminary round ===
==== Group A ====
Team	Pld	W	L	PF	PA	PD	Pts
New Caledonia	4	4	0	294	212	+82	8
Guam	4	3	1	306	214	+92	7
Tahiti	4	2	2	295	243	+52	6
Micronesia	4	1	3	279	344	−65	5
Solomon Islands	4	0	4	210	371	−161	4

29 August 2011
15:00

Report

Solomon Islands	44–86	Tahiti
Scoring by quarter: 17–26, 16–16, 4–33, 7–19
Pts: Wanefai 15; Rebs: Kari 10; Asts: S. Gwali, H. Gwali 3		Pts: Meuel 15; Rebs: Tapi 8 Asts: Teriitemataua 7

Salle Anewy, Nouméa
Referees: Noha Tetuanui, Sailass Kotton, Christophe Bonbon

29 August 2011
19:00

Report

New Caledonia	62–57	Guam
Scoring by quarter: 14–8, 16–18, 10–16, 22–15
Pts: Soeria-Ouamba 25; Rebs: Saminadin 8 Asts: Tetainanuarii 4		Pts: Chaco 13; Rebs: Stinnett 8 Asts: Blas, Jr. 6

Salle Anewy, Nouméa
Referees: Miguel Gallardo, David Ah Koi, Junior Mahit

30 August 2011
15:00

Report

Micronesia	56–73	Guam
Scoring by quarter: 12–24, 15–14, 14–21, 15–14
Pts: Hein 13; Rebs: Tobin 13; Asts: Sam 3		Pts: Sanchez 13; Rebs: Susuico 7 Asts: four players 3

Salle Anewy, Nouméa
Referees: Mana Moana, Charles Ha Ho, Jean-Claude Kilikili

30 August 2011
19:00

Report

New Caledonia	82–47	Solomon Islands
Scoring by quarter: 21–20, 21–15, 23–6, 17–6
Pts: Soeria-Ouamba 19; Rebs: Ha-Ho 10; Asts: Berniere 6		Pts: Wanefai 14; Rebs: Wanefai 8 Asts: Tuhaika, Bare 3

Salle Anewy, Nouméa
Referees: Gabrielle White, Navitalai Naivalu, Steve Baza

31 August 2011
13:00

Report

Tahiti	52–74	Guam
Scoring by quarter: 16–15, 10–18, 12–17, 14–24
Pts: Tepa 14; Rebs: Apeang 6 Asts: Sommers 3		Pts: Walker 20; Rebs: Walker, Susuico 6 Asts: Han 4

Salle Anewy, Nouméa
Referees: Noha Tetuanui, Mana Moana, Malekalio Fenuafanote

31 August 2011
17:00

Report

New Caledonia	98–57	Micronesia
Scoring by quarter: 19–17, 25–12, 18–16, 36–12
Pts: Tetainanuarii 17; Rebs: Berniere, Adjouhgniope 9 Asts: Saminadin 6		Pts: Nifon 13; Rebs: Taulung 7 Asts: three players 1

Salle Anewy, Nouméa
Referees: Steve Baza, Miguel Gallardo, Sailass Kotton

1 September 2011
15:00

Report

Tahiti	98–73	Micronesia
Scoring by quarter: 25–20, 21–19, 27–20, 25–14
Pts: Sommers 19; Rebs: Maitere, Meuel 6 Asts: Teriitemataua 7		Pts: Taulung 20; Rebs: Hein 9 Asts: Taulung, Tobin 7

Salle Sérandour, Nouméa
Referees: Brian Pongatapu, Steve Baza, Miguel Delaveuve

1 September 2011
19:00

Report

Guam	102–44	Solomon Islands
Scoring by quarter: 31–5, 24–10, 19–12, 28–17
Pts: Susuico 18; Rebs: Stake 8 Asts: Sanchez 7		Pts: Matanani 16; Rebs: Wanefai 10; Asts: Matanani 4

Salle Sérandour, Nouméa
Referees: Noha Tetuanui, Mike Delaveuve, Molagi Loi

2 September 2011
17:00

Report

Solomon Islands	75–93	Micronesia
Scoring by quarter: 20–26, 20–24, 15–21, 20–22
Pts: Turueke 17; Rebs: Kari 8 Asts: Matanani 6		Pts: Nifon 26; Rebs: Hein 11; Asts: Nifon 9

Salle Sérandour, Nouméa
Referees: Malekalio Fenuafanote, David Ah Koi, Jean-Claude Kilikili

2 September 2011
19:00

Report

New Caledonia	52–51	Tahiti
Scoring by quarter: 16–11, 11–18, 14–13, 11–9
Pts: Soeria-Ouamba, Tetainanuarii 14; Rebs: Tetainanuarii 12; Asts: Berniere, R. Weber 3		Pts: Meuel 12; Rebs: Tepa 6 Asts: Maitere 6

Salle Sérandour, Nouméa
Referees: Miguel Gallardo, Navitalai Naivalu, Sailass Kotton

==== Group B ====
Team	Pld	W	L	PF	PA	PD	Pts
Fiji	3	3	0	243	178	+65	6
Papua New Guinea	3	2	1	236	237	−1	5
American Samoa	3	1	2	198	225	−27	4
Samoa	3	0	3	197	234	−37	3

29 August 2011
15:00

Report

Fiji	80–61	Samoa
Scoring by quarter: 19–18, 27–18, 15–16, 19–9
Pts: L. Whippy 16; Rebs: Saketa 9 Asts: L. Whippy 9		Pts: Tuia 14; Rebs: Fesolai 13; Asts: Fesolai 5

Salle Sérandour, Nouméa
Referees: Steve Baza, Miguel Delaveuve, Mana Moana

29 August 2011
19:00

Report

American Samoa	75–88	Papua New Guinea
Scoring by quarter: 13–16, 26–26, 22–22, 14–24
Pts: Talaeai 15; Rebs: Talaeai 13; Asts: four players 3		Pts: A. Muri 18; Rebs: Parapa 12; Asts: Kala 6

Salle Sérandour, Nouméa
Referees: Gabrielle White, Charles Ha Ho, Lois Bigey

30 August 2011
13:00

Report

Papua New Guinea	86–75	Samoa
Scoring by quarter: 21–13, 18–21, 27–21, 20–20
Pts: Kala 22; Rebs: A. Muri 13; Asts: Kala 7		Pts: Fesolai 30; Rebs: Fesolai 15; Asts: Fesolai, Fuimaono 4

Salle Anewy, Nouméa
Referees: Miguel Gallardo, Mike Delaveuve, Lois Bigey

30 August 2011
17:00

Report

Fiji	76–55	American Samoa
Scoring by quarter: 24–17, 14–8, 20–19, 18–11
Pts: Saketa 19; Rebs: Saketa 10; Asts: L. Whippy 10		Pts: Salave'A, McCoy 12; Rebs: Le'Iato 10; Asts: McCoy 5

Salle Anewy, Nouméa
Referees: Brian Pongatapu, Miguel Delaveuve, Case Mamio

1 September 2011
15:00

Report

Samoa	61–68	American Samoa
Scoring by quarter: 14–22, 17–13, 18–12, 12–21
Pts: Fesolai 28; Rebs: Folasaitu, Fesolai 8 Asts: Folasaitu 5		Pts: Tausili 21; Rebs: Le'Iato 12; Asts: Toomalatai 5

Salle Anewy, Nouméa
Referees: Malekalio Fenuafanote, Christophe Bonbon, Jean-Claude Kilikili

1 September 2011
19:00

Report

Fiji	87–62	Papua New Guinea
Scoring by quarter: 20–9, 20–16, 21–21, 26–16
Pts: Saketa 27; Rebs: Saketa 11; Asts: L. Whippy 8		Pts: Kala 20; Rebs: Elavo 7 Asts: Davani 6

Salle Anewy, Nouméa
Referees: Mana Moana, Miguel Gallardo, Case Mamio

=== Knockout stage ===
==== Bracket ====
Quarterfinals
A1	New Caledonia	72
B4	Samoa	47
A3	Tahiti	97
B2	Papua New Guinea	66
A2	Guam	84
B3	American Samoa	46
A4	Micronesia	48
B1	Fiji	111

Semifinals
New Caledonia	63
Tahiti	51
Guam	57
Fiji	51

Final
New Caledonia	50
Guam	43
Third place
Tahiti	57
Fiji	49

5–8th bracket

Semifinals
Samoa	106
Papua New Guinea	92
American Samoa	96
Micronesia	71

Fifth place
Samoa	75
American Samoa	79
Seventh place
Papua New Guinea	95
Micronesia	77

==== Quarterfinals ====
3 September 2011
13:00

Report

Guam	84–46	American Samoa
Scoring by quarter: 21–10, 24–15, 23–8, 16–13
Pts: Blas, Jr. 16; Rebs: Stake 7 Asts: Okada 8		Pts: Le'Iato 17; Rebs: Le'Iato 11; Asts: McCoy 5

Salle Anewy, Nouméa
Referees: Miguel Gallardo, Sailass Kotton, Charles Ha Ho

3 September 2011
15:00

Report

Tahiti	97–66	Papua New Guinea
Scoring by quarter: 24–14, 25–22, 28–12, 20–18
Pts: Tapi, Meuel 18; Rebs: Tapi 12; Asts: Tepa 4		Pts: P. Muri, A. Muri 13; Rebs: A. Muri 9 Asts: P. Muri 5

Salle Anewy, Nouméa
Referees: Noha Tetuanui, Mana Moana, David Ah Koi

3 September 2011
17:00

Report

Micronesia	48–111	Fiji
Scoring by quarter: 10–28, 7–26, 15–23, 16–34
Pts: Hein 9 Rebs: Tobin, Hein 6 Asts: Taulung 5		Pts: Saketa 21; Rebs: Saketa 13; Asts: Whippy 9

Salle Anewy, Nouméa
Referees: Malekalio Fenuafanote, Christophe Bonbon, Mike Delaveuve

3 September 2011
19:00

Report

New Caledonia	72–47	Samoa
Scoring by quarter: 19–14, 18–9, 21–13, 14–11
Pts: B. Weber 13; Rebs: Berniere 8 Asts: Ha-Ho, Saminadin 4		Pts: Fesolai, Tuia 9 Rebs: Fidow, Purcell 9 Asts: Folasaitu, Purcell 3

Salle Anewy, Nouméa
Referees: Gabrielle White, Steve Baza, Navitalai Naivalu

==== 5–8th place Semifinals ====
5 September 2011
15:00

Report

Samoa	106–92	Papua New Guinea
Scoring by quarter: 28–16, 24–29, 20–29, 34–18
Pts: Fesolai 40; Rebs: Fidow 11; Asts: Purcell 8		Pts: A. Muri 19; Rebs: A. Muri 12; Asts: Davani 6

Arène du Sud, Nouméa
Referees: Noha Tetuanui, Jean-Claude Kilikili, Timoci Namalo

5 September 2011
19:00

Report

American Samoa	96–71	Micronesia
Scoring by quarter: 20–8, 23–22, 26–30, 27–11
Pts: Le'Iato 21; Rebs: Le'Iato 15; Asts: McCoy 8		Pts: Taulung 17; Rebs: Hein 14; Asts: Hein 8

Arène du Sud, Nouméa
Referees: Malekalio Fenuafanote, Mike Delaveuve, Junior Mahit

==== Semifinals ====
6 September 2011
15:00

Report

Guam	57–51	Fiji
Scoring by quarter: 22–12, 9–9, 10–16, 16–14
Pts: Blas, Jr. 17; Rebs: Estelle 9 Asts: Stinnett 6		Pts: J. Whippy 11; Rebs: Saketa 13; Asts: L. Whippy 5

Arène du Sud, Nouméa
Referees: Malekalio Fenuafanote, Mana Moana, Jean-Claude Kilikili

6 September 2011
19:00

Report

New Caledonia	63–51	Tahiti
Scoring by quarter: 11–15, 15–16, 27–8, 10–12
Pts: Tetainanuarii 18; Rebs: Tetainanuarii 17; Asts: Saminadin 5		Pts: Maitere 17; Rebs: Maitere 6 Asts: Meuel, Apeang 4

Arène du Sud, Nouméa
Referees: Miguel Gallardo, Gabrielle White, Navitalai Naivalu

==== Seventh place game ====
7 September 2011
11:00

Report

Papua New Guinea	95–77	Micronesia
Scoring by quarter: 14–10, 23–17, 24–24, 34–26
Pts: A. Muri 20; Rebs: three players 7 Asts: P. Muri 7		Pts: Nifon 29; Rebs: Lotte, Jr. 12; Asts: Taulung 5

Salle Omnisports, Poindimié
Referees: Charles Ha Ho, Timoci Namalo, Lois Bigey

==== Fifth place game ====
7 September 2011
15:00

Report

Samoa	75–79	American Samoa
Scoring by quarter: 19–25, 24–18, 16–18, 16–18
Pts: Fesolai 33; Rebs: Fesolai 16; Asts: Fesolai 4		Pts: McCoy 19; Rebs: Samia 10; Asts: McCoy 11

Salle Omnisports, Poindimié
Referees: Charles Ha Ho, Timoci Namalo, Lois Bigey

==== Third place game ====
8 September 2011
15:00

Report

Tahiti	57–49	Fiji
Scoring by quarter: 8–11, 18–17, 18–12, 13–9
Pts: Sommers 17; Rebs: Teriierooiterai 10; Asts: Maitere 4		Pts: J. Whippy 12; Rebs: Mara 13; Asts: J. Whippy 4

Arène du Sud, Nouméa
Referees: Malekalio Fenuafanote, Noha Tetuanui, Christophe Bonbon

==== Final ====
8 September 2011
19:00

Report

New Caledonia	50–43	Guam
Scoring by quarter: 11–7, 12–10, 14–12, 13–14
Pts: Soeria-Ouamba 13; Rebs: B. Weber 11; Asts: Soeria-Ouamba 5		Pts: Stinnett 20; Rebs: three players 8 Asts: Blas, Jr. 4

Arène du Sud, Nouméa
Referees: Miguel Gallardo, Navitalai Naivalu, Sailass Kotton

== Women ==
=== Preliminary round ===
==== Group A ====
Team	Pld	W	L	PF	PA	PD	Pts
Tahiti	3	3	0	218	163	+55	6
New Caledonia	3	2	1	205	190	+15	5
Samoa	3	1	2	190	200	−10	4
American Samoa	3	0	3	153	213	−60	3

29 August 2011
13:00

Report

Samoa	48–66	Tahiti
Scoring by quarter: 13–14, 12–14, 18–23, 5–15
Pts: Tuia 11; Rebs: Lolesi, Silva 7 Asts: Lolesi 4		Pts: Lefranc 31; Rebs: Lefranc 10; Asts: Lextreyt 4

Salle Anewy, Nouméa
Referees: Malekalio Fenuafanote, Timoci Namalo, Loatsis Seneres

29 August 2011
17:00

Report

New Caledonia	69–40	American Samoa
Scoring by quarter: 14–15, 13–9, 19–8, 23–8
Pts: Armand 15; Rebs: three players 5 Asts: Armand 6		Pts: Marshall 15; Rebs: Marshall, Tauai-Yandall 10; Asts: Telefoni 2

Salle Anewy, Nouméa
Referees: Navitalai Naivalu, Ronnie Mea, Molagi Loi

31 August 2011
17:00

Report

Tahiti	72–50	American Samoa
Scoring by quarter: 16–6, 16–15, 21–14, 19–15
Pts: Lefranc 18; Rebs: Lefranc, Lefranc 5 Asts: Laille 8		Pts: Tauai-Yandall 16; Rebs: Telefoni 13; Asts: Telefoni 5

Salle Sérandour, Nouméa
Referees: Charles Ha Ho, Christophe Bonbon, Anna Kaue

31 August 2011
19:00

Report

New Caledonia	71–70	Samoa
Scoring by quarter: 14–18, 22–16, 17–21, 18–15
Pts: Gies 23; Rebs: Gies 16; Asts: Luepak 9		Pts: Davis 20; Rebs: Silva 8 Asts: Tuia 7

Salle Sérandour, Nouméa
Referees: Navitalai Naivalu, Ronnie Mea, Timoci Namalo

1 September 2011
13:00

Report

American Samoa	63–72	Samoa
Scoring by quarter: 16–19, 20–13, 16–21, 11–19
Pts: Tauai-Yandall 19; Rebs: Marshall 16; Asts: Puaina 5		Pts: Davis 19; Rebs: Hopkins 10; Asts: Tuia 5

Salle Anewy, Nouméa
Referees: Navitalai Naivalu, Lois Bigey, Junior Mahit

1 September 2011
17:00

Report

New Caledonia	65–80 (OT)	Tahiti
Scoring by quarter: 12–16, 19–8, 11–17, 20–21, Overtime: 3–18
Pts: Luepak 22; Rebs: Fenuafanote 8 Asts: Armand 4		Pts: Lefranc 32; Rebs: three players 5 Asts: Laille 5

Salle Anewy, Nouméa
Referees: Gabrielle White, Sailass Kotton, David Ah Koi

==== Group B ====
Team	Pld	W	L	PF	PA	PD	Pts
Fiji	3	2	1	188	129	+59	5
Papua New Guinea	3	2	1	191	162	+29	5
Guam	3	2	1	171	167	+4	5
Vanuatu	3	0	3	122	214	−92	3

29 August 2011
13:00

Report

Fiji	53–56	Papua New Guinea
Scoring by quarter: 10–12, 12–15, 20–13, 11–16
Pts: Whippy 16; Rebs: Puamau 8 Asts: Dobui 8		Pts: Karo 16; Rebs: Karo; Asts: Waka 9

Salle Sérandour, Nouméa
Referees: Mike Delaveuve (NCL), Valusia Talataina (SAM), Case Mamio

29 August 2011
17:00

Report

Guam	61–50	Vanuatu
Scoring by quarter: 10–9, 15–14, 19–7, 17–20
Pts: Benito 21; Rebs: Benito 14; Asts: Pardilla 12		Pts: Willy 15; Rebs: Waroka 9 Asts: Willy 3

Salle Sérandour, Nouméa
Referees: Brian Pongatapu (SOL), Jacki Hunt-Frosgren (ASA), Anna Kaue

31 August 2011
15:00

Report

Fiji	55–47	Guam
Scoring by quarter: 10–14, 15–6, 16–17, 14–10
Pts: Whippy 20; Rebs: Whippy 13; Asts: Koyamainavure 8		Pts: Pardilla 15; Rebs: Castro 11; Asts: Pardilla 6

Salle Anewy, Nouméa
Referees: Gabrielle White, Brian Pongatapu, Junior Mahit

31 August 2011
19:00

Report

Vanuatu	46–73	Papua New Guinea
Scoring by quarter: 9–12, 8–18, 19–23, 10–20
Pts: Simbolo 14; Rebs: Simbolo 5 Asts: Java 4		Pts: Paisoi 20; Rebs: Koivi 12; Asts: Maroroa, Waka 6

Salle Anewy, Nouméa
Referees: Jacki Hunt-Frosgren, Case Mamio, Valusia Talataina

1 September 2011
13:00

Report

Fiji	80–26	Vanuatu
Scoring by quarter: 13–2, 26–4, 28–14, 13–6
Pts: Wise 15; Rebs: Whippy 14; Asts: Whippy, Dobui 9		Pts: Willy 7 Rebs: Waroka 6 Asts: Izono 3

Salle Sérandour, Nouméa
Referees: Ronnie Mea, Valusia Talataina, Loatsis Seneres

1 September 2011
17:00

Report

Papua New Guinea	62–63	Guam
Scoring by quarter: 16–20, 14–13, 16–14, 16–16
Pts: Waka 17; Rebs: Wallace 13; Asts: Maroroa 9		Pts: Santos 21; Rebs: Castro 11; Asts: Pardilla 7

Salle Sérandour, Nouméa
Referees: Charles Ha Ho, Jacki Hunt-Frosgren, Timoci Namalo

=== Knockout stage ===
==== Bracket ====
Quarterfinals
A1	Tahiti	70
B4	Vanuatu	39
A3	Samoa	71
B2	Papua New Guinea	42
A2	New Caledonia	55
B3	Guam	32
A4	American Samoa	25
B1	Fiji	60

Semifinals
WQF1	Tahiti	69
WQF2	Samoa	45
WQF3	New Caledonia	56
WQF4	Fiji	50

Final
WSF1	Tahiti	59
WSF2	New Caledonia	47
Third place
LSF1	Samoa	51
LSF1	Fiji	64

5–8th bracket

Semifinals
27 July
Vanuatu	67
Papua New Guinea	74
27 July
Guam	50
American Samoa	37

Fifth place
28 July
Papua New Guinea	71
Guam	56
Seventh place
28 July
Vanuatu	70
American Samoa	67

==== Quarterfinals ====
2 September 2011
13:00

Report

New Caledonia	55–32	Guam
Scoring by quarter: 9–13, 14–4, 17–6, 15–9
Pts: Armand 10; Rebs: Gies 13; Asts: Armand 3		Pts: Pardilla 10; Rebs: Benito 8 Asts: Pardilla 3

Salle Anewy, Nouméa
Referees: Gabrielle White, Timoci Namalo, Jacki Hunt-Frosgren

2 September 2011
15:00

Report

Samoa	71–42	Papua New Guinea
Scoring by quarter: 17–10, 16–9, 17–12, 21–11
Pts: Davis 24; Rebs: Hopkins 16; Asts: Tuia 6		Pts: Wallace 9 Rebs: Wallace 9 Asts: three players 2

Salle Anewy, Nouméa
Referees: Noha Tetuanui, Mike Delaveuve, Steve Baza

2 September 2011
18:00

Report

American Samoa	25–60	Fiji
Scoring by quarter: 14–11, 5–19, 4–18, 2–12
Pts: Magalei 6 Rebs: Tauai-Yandall 8 Asts: Marshall 4		Pts: Whippy 21; Rebs: Koyamainavure 8 Asts: Whippy 7

Salle Anewy, Nouméa
Referees: Mana Moana, Brian Pongatapu, Loatsis Seneres

2 September 2011
19:00

Report

Tahiti	70–39	Vanuatu
Scoring by quarter: 14–11, 18–6, 18–14, 20–8
Pts: Lefranc 18; Rebs: Potiron 9 Asts: Etaeta, Laille 4		Pts: Izono, Willy 10; Rebs: Patterson 8 Asts: four players 2

Salle Anewy, Nouméa
Referees: Christophe Bonbon, Molagi Loi, Anna Kaue

==== 5–8th place Semifinals ====
5 September 2011
13:00

Report

Vanuatu	67–74	Papua New Guinea
Scoring by quarter: 11–13, 21–15, 18–26, 17–20
Pts: Willy 23; Rebs: Waroka 11; Asts: Willy 5		Pts: Waka 20; Rebs: Diro, Koivi 10; Asts: Maroroa 4

Arène du Sud, Nouméa
Referees: Mana Moana, Molagi Loi, Lois Bigey

5 September 2011
17:00

Report

Guam	50–37	American Samoa
Scoring by quarter: 10–9, 17–12, 10–12, 13–4
Pts: Santos 14; Rebs: Santos, Pardilla 9 Asts: Pardilla 4		Pts: Marshall 17; Rebs: Marshall 16; Asts: Magalei, Tauai-Yandall 3

Arène du Sud, Nouméa
Referees: Christophe Bonbon, Case Mamio, Anna Kave

==== Semifinals ====
6 September 2011
13:00

Report

Tahiti	69–45	Samoa
Scoring by quarter: 21–10, 17–11, 18–12, 13–12
Pts: Lefranc 14; Rebs: Lextreyt 7 Asts: three players 3		Pts: Lolesi 9 Rebs: Hicks 12; Asts: Tuia 4

Arène du Sud, Nouméa
Referees: Noha Tetuanui, Christophe Bonbon, Sailass Kotton

6 September 2011
17:00

Report

New Caledonia	56–50	Fiji
Scoring by quarter: 17–17, 12–17, 11–7, 16–9
Pts: Gies 14; Rebs: Gies 16; Asts: Luepak, Armand 4		Pts: Whippy 17; Rebs: Whippy 12; Asts: Whippy 6

Arène du Sud, Nouméa
Referees: Steve Baza, Jacki Hunt-Frosgren, David Ah Koi

==== Seventh place game ====
7 September 2011
09:00

Report

Vanuatu	70–67 (OT)	American Samoa
Scoring by quarter: 10–11, 11–14, 17–16, 21–18, Overtime: 11–8
Pts: Willy 29; Rebs: Daniel 12; Asts: Willy 7		Pts: Telefoni 17; Rebs: Marshall 20; Asts: Marshall 6

Salle omnisports Poindimié, Nouméa
Referees: Ronnie Mea, Brian Pongatapu, Junior Mahit

==== Fifth place game ====
7 September 2011
13:00

Report

Papua New Guinea	71–56	Guam
Scoring by quarter: 13–23, 21–12, 23–11, 14–10
Pts: Wallace 24; Rebs: Waka 14; Asts: Waka 6		Pts: Benito 22; Rebs: Castro 9 Asts: Pardilla 4

Salle omnisports Poindimié, Nouméa
Referees: Junior Mahit, Brian Pongatapu, Molagi Loi

==== Third place game ====
8 September 2011
13:00

Report

Samoa	51–64	Fiji
Scoring by quarter: 15–22, 13–13, 11–15, 12–14
Pts: Silva 18; Rebs: Alesana 6 Asts: Tuia 6		Pts: Whippy 20; Rebs: Whippy 12; Asts: Whippy 7

Arène du Sud, Nouméa
Referees: Mana Moana, Jean-Claude Kilikili, Jacki Hunt-Frosgren

==== Final ====
8 September 2011
17:00

Report

Tahiti	59–47	New Caledonia
Scoring by quarter: 18–13, 5–15, 15–12, 21–7
Pts: Lefranc 20; Rebs: Laille 6 Asts: Laille 7		Pts: Fenuafanote 12; Rebs: Armand 10; Asts: Luepak 3

Arène du Sud, Nouméa
Referees: Gabrielle White, Steve Baza, David Ah Koi
