= Sailing at the Pacific Games =

Sailing at the Pacific Games was first contested when the sport was added for the 1969 games at Port Moresby. It has also been included at several of the Pacific Mini Games, starting with the fifth edition held in American Samoa in 1997.

== Pacific Games ==
The sailing events contested at each Pacific Games are listed in the table below. Flag icons and three letter country code indicate the nationality of the gold medal winner of an event, where this information is known; otherwise an (X) is used. Moving the cursor onto a country code with a dotted underline will reveal the name of the gold medal winner. A dash (–) indicates an event that was not contested.

=== Sailboats ===
Games	Year	Host city	Men's dinghy		Open multihull		Women's dinghy		Total events	Refs
I – II	Sailing not contested 1963–1966									
			Fireball							
			Pair	Team						
III	1969	Port Moresby	PNG	–	–	–	–	–	1	(Note: Papua New Guinea won the Fireball event, with Geoff Dabb (Dabb & Antonieff) the winners, ahead of Tahiti's Alan Burgaud (Burgaud & Burgaud), and Fiji's Bill Gardiner (Gardiner & Gilmore) in third.)
IV	1971	Papeete	TAH	–	–	–	–	–	1	(Note: Home team Tahiti took all three medals in Fireball dinghy event, with Krault and Frei the winning pair.)
			Laser		Hobie 16					
			Single	Team	Pair	Team				
V	1975	Tumon	GUM	–	–	–	–	–	1	(Note: Laser class won by Guam's Phil Drips ahead of Kevin Read (PNG) and Bill Gardiner (Fiji).)
VI	1979	Suva	–	–	TAH	–	–	–	1	(Note: Hobie 16 class won by J. Salmon & N. Salmon of Tahiti, ahead of compatriots D. Arnould & G. Sachet, with A. Mazoyer & N. Cale of New Caledonia in third place.)
VII	Sailing not contested in 1983									
VIII	1987	Nouméa	–	–	NCL	NCL	–	–	2	(Note: In 1987, host nation New Caledonia completed a clean sweep of the eight available sailing gold medals, winning all Hobie 16 and sailboarding classes.)
IX	1991	Port Moresby	–	–	TAH	TAH	–	–	2	(Note: The French territories dominated the regatta. Tahiti won the two Hobie events, and New Caledonia won all six sailboarding events.)
X	1995	Papeete	–	–	TAH	TAH	–	–	2	(Note: Tahiti won both gold medals in the Hobie 16 class and a further gold in the heavyweight men's sailboard but New Caledonia dominated the rest of sailboarding events, winning five gold medals.)
			Laser		Hobie 16		Laser Radial			
			Single	Team	Pair	Team	Single	Team		
XI	1999	Santa Rita	GUM	GUM	–	–	NCL	NCL	4	(Note: Hosts Guam won both gold medals in men's Laser. New Caledonia won both gold medals in women's Laser Radial, and a further four gold in sailboarding. The men's heavyweight sailboarding gold medals were won by Fiji's Tony and John Philip.)
XII	2003	Suva	TAH	TAH	NCL	NCL	NCL	FIJ	6	(Note: In 2003 there were five fleet sailing events; Laser for men, Laser Radial for women, Hobie 16 open class, and men's and women's sailboarding (using Mistral One Design equipment). Each event was contested over 10–12 races. A gold medal was presented to the outright winner of each event (single sailor or sailing pair for the Hobie 16). The best national team in each event (on a three craft per team basis) was also awarded a gold medal – although at this games no team medal was awarded for women's sailboard as only one team entered. The New Caledonian women sailboarders Solenn Gourand, Ginseng Jeandot & Stephanie DuFourmantelle finished first, second and fourth in the regatta but there was only one other competitor in the event - Turia Vogel of Cook Islands, who finished third. New Caledonia also dominated the sailboarding with Samuel Launay winning the men's event, and Solenn Gourand winning the women's event. There were nine sailing gold medals presented.)
XIII	2007	Apia	NCL	NCL	NCL	NCL	NCL	NCL	6	
XIV	2011	Nouméa	NCL	NCL	TAH	TAH	COK	COK	6	
XV	2015	Port Moresby	AUS	AUS	NCL	NCL	COK	COK	6	
XV	2019	Apia	NCL	NCL	NCL	NCL	NCL	SAM	6	
XVI	2023	Honiara	NCL	NCL	–	–	AUS	AUS	4	

=== Sailboards ===
Sailboarding was first included at the 1987 South Pacific Games and has been dominated by New Caledonia.

Games	Year	Host city	Men's		Men's heavyweight		Women's		Total events	Refs
			Single	Team	Single	Team	Single	Team		
VIII	1987	Nouméa	NCL	NCL	NCL	NCL	NCL	NCL	6	
IX	1991	Port Moresby	NCL	NCL	NCL	NCL	NCL	NCL	6	
X	1995	Papeete	NCL	NCL	TAH	NCL	NCL	NCL	6	
XI	1999	Santa Rita	NCL	NCL	FIJ	FIJ	NCL	NCL	6	
XII	2003	Suva	NCL	NCL	–	–	NCL	not awarded	3	
Sailboarding not contested 2007—2019
XVI	2023	Honiara	NCL	NCL	NCL	–	NCL	NCL	5	

== Pacific Mini Games ==
Sailing joined the Pacific Mini Games program in 1997.

Games	Year	Host city	Men's dinghy		Open multihull		Women's dinghy		Total events	Refs
I – IV	Sailing not contested 1981–1993									
			Laser		Hobie 16		Laser Radial			
			Single	Team	Pair	Team	Single	Team		
V	1997	Pago Pago	GUM	GUM	TAH	TAH	TAH	not awarded	5	(Note: Guam took the honours in the multihulls while Guam won the three dinghy gold medals (no medal was awarded in the women's team event for Laser Radial).)
VI–VII	Sailing not contested 2001–2005									
VIII	2009	Rarotonga	TAH	COK	NCL	NCL	COK	COK	6	(Note: In the dinghy events, host nation Cook Islands won three gold medals and Tahiti won one gold medal. New Caledonia won two gold medals in the Hobie 16.)
IX	2013	Mata-Utu	NCL	NCL	FIJ	FIJ	COK	NCL	6	(Note: New Caledonia won three dinghy gold medals, with Cook Islands taking one gold. Fiji took the multihull honours.)
X–XI	Sailing not contested 2017–2025									

== See also ==
- Sailing at the Asian Games
- Sailing at the Summer Olympics
