= Basketball at the 1969 South Pacific Games =

Basketball at the 1969 South Pacific Games was played at Port Moresby, Papua New Guinea in August 1969. Men's and women's tournaments were held with eight and six teams, respectively, competing.

After a round robin stage the teams in the top two positions played off for the gold and silver medals, and the teams in the third and fourth positions played off for the bronze medal.

== Medal summary ==
Event	Gold	Silver	Bronze
Men's	Tahiti	Papua New Guinea	New Caledonia
Women's	Papua New Guinea	Tahiti	Fiji

== Men's tournament ==
=== Standings ===
Qualified for the Finals
Qualified for the Battle-For-Third

Final standings after the round robin tournament:

Team	Pld	W	L	PF	PA	PD	Pts
Tahiti	7	7	0	533	269	285	14
Papua New Guinea	7	5	2	416	248	-5	10
Guam	7	5	2	544	421	168	10
New Caledonia	7	5	2	499	376	-45	10
Nauru	7	2	5	390	544	-25	4
American Samoa	7	2	5	374	415	-131	4
Fiji	7	2	5	463	505	-228	4
Solomon Islands	7	0	7	250	691	250	0

=== Group matches ===
August 1969

Tahiti	43–40	Papua New Guinea

Port Moresby, PNG

August 1969

Tahiti	79–38	Guam

Port Moresby, PNG

August 1969

Tahiti	67–47	New Caledonia

Port Moresby, PNG

August 1969

Tahiti	101–29	Nauru

Port Moresby, PNG

August 1969

Tahiti	63–47	American Samoa

Port Moresby, PNG

August 1969

Tahiti	73–45	Fiji

Port Moresby, PNG

August 1969

Tahiti	107–23	Solomon Islands

Port Moresby, PNG

August 1969

Papua New Guinea	54–44	Guam

Port Moresby, PNG

August 1969

Papua New Guinea	66–28	Nauru

Port Moresby, PNG

August 1969

Papua New Guinea	67–32	American Samoa

Port Moresby, PNG

August 1969

Papua New Guinea	71–42	Fiji

Port Moresby, PNG

August 1969

Papua New Guinea	83–15	Solomon Islands

Port Moresby, PNG

August 1969

Guam	75–64	New Caledonia

Port Moresby, PNG

August 1969

Guam	108–63	Nauru

Port Moresby, PNG

August 1969

Guam	85–60	American Samoa

Port Moresby, PNG

August 1969

Guam	85–59	Fiji

Port Moresby, PNG

August 1969

Guam	109–42	Solomon Islands

Port Moresby, PNG

August 1969

New Caledonia	44–35	Papua New Guinea

Port Moresby, PNG

August 1969

New Caledonia	100–49	Nauru

Port Moresby, PNG

August 1969

New Caledonia	51–36	American Samoa

Port Moresby, PNG

August 1969

New Caledonia	88–80	Fiji

Port Moresby, PNG

August 1969

New Caledonia	105–34	Solomon Islands

Port Moresby, PNG

August 1969

Nauru	81–72	Fiji

Port Moresby, PNG

August 1969

Nauru	86–41	Solomon Islands

Port Moresby, PNG

August 1969

American Samoa	56–54	Nauru

Port Moresby, PNG

August 1969

American Samoa	90–41	Solomon Islands

Port Moresby, PNG

August 1969

Fiji	54–53	American Samoa

Port Moresby, PNG

August 1969

Fiji	111–54	Solomon Islands

Port Moresby, PNG

=== Bronze medal game ===
August 1969

Guam	64–72	New Caledonia

Port Moresby, PNG

=== Men's final ===
August 1969

Tahiti	56–39	Papua New Guinea

Port Moresby, PNG

== Women's tournament ==
=== Standings ===
Qualified for the Finals
Qualified for the Battle-For-Third

Final standings after the round robin tournament:

Team	Pld	W	L	PF	PA	PD	Pts
Papua New Guinea	4	3	1	227	110	+117	6
Tahiti	4	3	1	203	120	+83	6
Fiji	2	2	2	241	151	+90	4
New Caledonia	4	2	2	182	182	0	4
Guam	4	0	4	81	371	−290	10

=== Group matches ===
August 1969

Papua New Guinea	23–17	Tahiti

Port Moresby, PNG

August 1969

New Caledonia	43–34	Fiji

Port Moresby, PNG

August 1969

New Caledonia	64–42	Guam

Port Moresby, PNG

August 1969

Fiji	117–14	Guam

Port Moresby, PNG

August 1969

Papua New Guinea	51–26	New Caledonia

Port Moresby, PNG

August 1969

Tahiti	82–16	Guam

Port Moresby, PNG

August 1969

Tahiti	55–49	New Caledonia

Port Moresby, PNG

August 1969

Papua New Guinea	108–9	Guam

Port Moresby, PNG

August 1969

Tahiti	49–32	Fiji

Port Moresby, PNG

August 1969

Fiji	58–45	Papua New Guinea

Port Moresby, PNG

=== Bronze medal playoff ===
August 1969

Fiji	50–28	New Caledonia

Port Moresby, PNG

=== Women's final ===
August 1969

Papua New Guinea	35–33	Tahiti

Port Moresby, PNG

== See also ==
- Basketball at the Pacific Games
