= Guam women's national basketball team =

Guam
- FIBA ranking: 116 (14 September 2026)
- Joined FIBA: 1974
- FIBA zone: FIBA Oceania
- National federation: Guam Basketball Confederation

Olympic Games
- Appearances: None

World Cup
- Appearances: None

Asia Cup
- Appearances: None

Pacific Games
- Appearances: 13
- Medals: Bronze: 1 (1999)

Micronesian Cup
- Appearances: 2
- Medals: Gold: 2 (2022, 2026)
Home	Away

The Guam women's national basketball team is a women's basketball team representing the territory of Guam, administered by the Guam Basketball Confederation.

== Results ==
=== Pacific Games ===
- 1969 – 5th place
- 1971 – 5th place
- 1975 – 4th place
- 1979 – 7th place
- 1983 – 9th place
- 1987 – 4th place
- 1991 – 6th place
- 1995 – 4th place
- 1999 – 3rd place
- 2011 – 6th place
- 2015 – 5th place
- 2019 – 4th place
- 2023 – 5th place

=== FIBA Micronesian Cup ===
- 2022 – Champions
- 2026 – Champions
