= FIBA Micronesian Cup =

Basketball tournament organized by FIBA Oceania

- Current season, competition or edition: 2026 FIBA Micronesian Cup
- Sport: Basketball
- Founded: 2022
- Country: FIBA Oceania member nations
- Continent: FIBA Oceania (Oceania)
- Most recent champion: Federated States of Micronesia (1st title)
- Website: www.fiba.basketball

The FIBA Micronesian Cup is one of three new regional basketball tournaments organized by FIBA Oceania. The tournament was introduced in June 2022 for countries in the Micronesian sub-zone.

== Significance ==
According to David Crocker, executive director of FIBA Oceania, one of the main reasons for creating the tournament was to strengthen competition within Oceania and at the Pacific Games, ideally creating new national rivalries.

== Men's tournaments ==
=== Summary ===
Year	Host	Final			Bronze medal game		
Year	Host	Champions	Score	Second place	Third place	Score	Fourth place
2022; Details	(Guam); Mangilao	Guam	93–45	Palau	Northern Mariana Islands	82–78	Federated States of Micronesia
2026; Details	(Guam); Mangilao	Federated States of Micronesia	151–139 (Agg.)	Palau	—	—	—

=== Medal table ===
Rank	Nation	Gold	Silver	Bronze	Total
1	Federated States of Micronesia	1	0	0	1
1	Guam	1	0	0	1
3	Palau	0	2	0	2
4	Northern Mariana Islands	0	0	1	1
Totals (4 entries)		2	2	1	5

FIBA Women's Micronesian Cup
- Current season, competition or edition: 2026 FIBA Women's Micronesian Cup
- Sport: Basketball
- Founded: 2022
- Country: FIBA Oceania member nations
- Continent: FIBA Oceania (Oceania)
- Most recent champion: Guam (2nd title)
- Most titles: Guam (2 titles)
- Website: www.fiba.basketball

== Women's tournaments ==
=== Summary ===
Year	Host	Final			Bronze medal game		
Year	Host	Champions	Score	Second place	Third place	Score	Fourth place
2022; Details	(Guam); Mangilao	Guam	70–37	Northern Mariana Islands	Palau	79–35	Federated States of Micronesia
2026; Details	(Guam); Mangilao	Guam	Round robin	Federated States of Micronesia	Palau	—	—

=== Medal table ===
Rank	Nation	Gold	Silver	Bronze	Total
1	Guam	2	0	0	2
2	Federated States of Micronesia	0	1	0	1
2	Northern Mariana Islands	0	1	0	1
4	Palau	0	0	2	2
Totals (4 entries)		2	2	2	6
