= Basketball at the 2015 Pacific Games =

Basketball competition

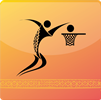
- Basketball pictogram for the Games
- Venue: Taurama Aquatic and Indoor Centre (5x5 prelims phase); Sir John Guise Indoor Stadium
- Location: Port Moresby, Papua New Guinea
- Dates: 3–12 July

Basketball at the 2015 Pacific Games in Port Moresby, Papua New Guinea was held at the BSP Arena and PNG Power Dome on 3–12 July 2015.

Guam won the gold medal in the men's tournament, defeating Fiji by 78–61 in the final. Tahiti secured the bronze medal by beating hosts Papua New Guinea by 83–73.

Fiji won the gold medal in the women's tournament, defeating American Samoa by 75–61. Tahiti beat Papua New Guinea by 62–51 to win the bronze medal.

== Medal summary ==
=== Medal table ===
Rank	Nation	Gold	Silver	Bronze	Total
1	Fiji	1	1	0	2
2	Guam	1	0	0	1
3	American Samoa	0	1	0	1
4	French Polynesia	0	0	2	2
Totals (4 entries)		2	2	2	6

=== Results ===
Event	Gold	Silver	Bronze
Men	Guam	Fiji	Tahiti
Women	Fiji	American Samoa	Tahiti

== Participating nations ==
Ten countries competed in basketball at the 2015 Pacific Games:

- American Samoa
- Fiji
- French Polynesia
- Guam
- Kiribati
- Nauru
- New Caledonia
- Papua New Guinea
- Samoa
- Solomon Islands

== Men's tournament ==
=== Group A ===
Pos	Team	Pld	W	L	PF	PA	PD	Pts	Qualification
1	Tahiti	4	4	0	338	221	+117	8	Advance to the top six playoffs
2	Guam	4	3	1	373	251	+122	6	Advance to the top six playoffs
3	Samoa	4	2	2	317	322	−5	4	Advance to the top six playoffs
4	Solomon Islands	4	1	3	261	304	−43	2	
5	Kiribati	4	0	4	245	436	−191	0	

Source: pg2015 (archived)
Rules for classification: a. points; b. win–loss record; c. goal average d. head-to-head records; e. quotient system

July 3
13:00

Kiribati	86–108	Samoa

BSP Arena, Port Moresby

July 3
15:00

Guam	66–76	Tahiti

BSP Arena, Port Moresby

July 4
09:00

Solomon Islands	35–76	Tahiti

BSP Arena, Port Moresby

July 4
11:00

Guam	79–72	Samoa

BSP Arena, Port Moresby

July 5
14:00

Kiribati	57–94	Solomon Islands

BSP Arena, Port Moresby

July 5
15:00

Samoa	59–87	Tahiti

BSP Arena, Port Moresby

July 6
15:00

Samoa	78–70	Solomon Islands

BSP Arena, Port Moresby

July 6
17:00

Guam	135–41	Kiribati

BSP Arena, Port Moresby

July 7
14:00

Kiribati	66–99	Tahiti

BSP Arena, Port Moresby

July 7
16:00

Guam	93–62	Solomon Islands

BSP Arena, Port Moresby

=== Group B ===
Pos	Team	Pld	W	L	PF	PA	PD	Pts	Qualification
1	Papua New Guinea	4	3	1	336	250	+86	6 (Note: Fiji 73–75 Papua New Guinea)	Advance to the top six playoffs
2	Fiji	4	3	1	346	242	+104	6	Advance to the top six playoffs
3	American Samoa	4	2	2	300	286	+14	4 (Note: American Samoa 84–73 New Caledonia)	Advance to the top six playoffs
4	New Caledonia	4	2	2	305	274	+31	4	
5	Nauru	4	0	4	179	414	−235	0	

Source: pg2015 (archived)
Rules for classification: a. points; b. win–loss record; c. overall goal average d. head-to-head records; e. quotient system
Notes:

July 3
17:00

Fiji	126–52	Nauru

BSP Arena, Port Moresby

July 3
19:00

New Caledonia	77–74	Papua New Guinea

BSP Arena, Port Moresby

July 4
12:00

Fiji	79–58	New Caledonia

BSP Arena, Port Moresby

July 4
13:00

American Samoa	65–90	Papua New Guinea

BSP Arena, Port Moresby

July 5
16:00

American Samoa	94–55	Nauru

BSP Arena, Port Moresby

July 5
19:00

Fiji	73–75	Papua New Guinea

BSP Arena, Port Moresby

July 6
09:00

Nauru	37–97	New Caledonia

BSP Arena, Port Moresby

July 6
11:00

American Samoa	57–68	Fiji

BSP Arena, Port Moresby

July 7
15:00

American Samoa	84–73	New Caledonia

BSP Arena, Port Moresby

July 7
19:00

Papua New Guinea	97–35	Nauru

BSP Arena, Port Moresby

=== Classification playoffs ===
Team	Pld	W	L	PF	PA	PD
New Caledonia	2	2	0			
Solomon Islands	2	1	1			
Kiribati	2	1	1			
Nauru	2	0	2			

Source: pg2015 (archived)

July 8
11:00

Kiribati	78–72	Nauru

BSP Arena, Port Moresby

July 8
13:00

New Caledonia	90–70	Solomon Islands

BSP Arena, Port Moresby

July 9
09:00

Nauru	71–95	Solomon Islands

BSP Arena, Port Moresby

July 9
16:00

Kiribati	54–148	New Caledonia

BSP Arena, Port Moresby

=== Top six playoffs ===
Team	Pld	W	L	PF	PA	PD
Guam	3	3	0			
Fiji	3	2	1			
Papua New Guinea	3	2	1			
Tahiti	3	1	2			
Samoa	3	1	2			
American Samoa	3	0	3			

Source: pg2015 (archived)

July 8
15:00

American Samoa	71–77	Samoa

BSP Arena, Port Moresby

July 8
17:00

Fiji	72–75	Guam

BSP Arena, Port Moresby

July 8
19:00

Papua New Guinea	81–70	Tahiti

BSP Arena, Port Moresby

July 9
13:00

American Samoa	75–91	Guam

BSP Arena, Port Moresby

July 9
17:00

Fiji	75–67	Tahiti

BSP Arena, Port Moresby

July 9
19:00

Papua New Guinea	75–65	Samoa

BSP Arena, Port Moresby

July 10
15:00

Fiji	102–63	Samoa

BSP Arena, Port Moresby

July 10
17:00

American Samoa	77–78	Tahiti

BSP Arena, Port Moresby

July 10
19:00

Guam	103–53	Papua New Guinea

BSP Arena, Port Moresby

=== Finals ===
Semi-finals and medal finals were played at the Power Dome on Saturday 11 July and Sunday 12 July, respectively.

Semi-finals
Guam	89
Tahiti	57
Fiji	82
Papua New Guinea	52

Final
Guam	78
Fiji	61
Third place
Tahiti	83
Papua New Guinea	73

==== Semi-finals ====
July 11
12:00

Guam	89–57	Tahiti

PNG Power Dome, Port Moresby

July 11
16:00

Fiji	82–52	Papua New Guinea

PNG Power Dome, Port Moresby

==== Third place ====
July 12
13:00

Papua New Guinea	73–83	Tahiti

PNG Power Dome, Port Moresby

==== Final ====
July 12
15:00

Fiji	61–78	Guam

PNG Power Dome, Port Moresby

== Women's tournament ==
=== Group A ===
Pos	Team	Pld	W	L	PF	PA	PD	Pts	Qualification
1	Tahiti	3	3	0	270	147	+123	6	Advance to the top four playoffs
2	Papua New Guinea	3	2	1	243	225	+18	4	Advance to the top four playoffs
3	Guam	3	1	2	259	190	+69	2	
4	Nauru	3	0	3	107	317	−210	0	

Source: pg2015 (archived)

=== Group B ===
Pos	Team	Pld	W	L	PF	PA	PD	Pts	Qualification
1	Fiji	3	3	0	259	166	+93	6	Advance to the top four playoffs
2	American Samoa	3	2	1	232	187	+45	4	Advance to the top four playoffs
3	New Caledonia	3	1	2	175	214	−39	2	
4	Solomon Islands	3	0	3	147	246	−99	0	

Source: pg2015 (archived)

=== Classification playoffs ===
Team	Pld	W	L	PF	PA	PD
Guam	2	0	0			
New Caledonia	2	1	1			
Solomon Islands	2	1	1			
Nauru	2	0	2			

Source pg2015 (archived)

9 July
12:00

Guam	100–72	Solomon Islands

BSP Arena, Port Moresby

9 July
14:00

Nauru	37–79	New Caledonia

BSP Arena, Port Moresby

10 July
9:00

Guam	68–57	New Caledonia

BSP Arena, Port Moresby

10 July
12:00

Nauru	55–73	Solomon Islands

BSP Arena, Port Moresby

=== Top four playoffs ===
Team	Pld	W	L	PF	PA	PD
American Samoa	2	2	0			
Fiji	2	2	0			
Tahiti	2	0	2			
Papua New Guinea	2	0	2			

Source pg2015 (archived)

9 July
11:00

Fiji	88–60	Papua New Guinea

BSP Arena, Port Moresby

9 July
15:00

American Samoa	75–63	Tahiti

BSP Arena, Port Moresby

10 July
11:00

American Samoa	71–55	Papua New Guinea

BSP Arena, Port Moresby

10 July
13:00

Fiji	72–48	Tahiti

BSP Arena, Port Moresby

=== Finals ===
The medal matches were played at the PNG Power Dome on Saturday 11 July.

==== Third place ====
11 July
14:00

Papua New Guinea	51–62	Tahiti

PNG Power Dome, Port Moresby

==== Final ====
11 July
18:00

American Samoa	61–75	Fiji

PNG Power Dome, Port Moresby

== See also ==
- Basketball at the Pacific Games
