= Pita Gus Sowakula =

Fiji & NZ international rugby union player

- Full name: Pita Gus Nacagilevu Sowakula
- Born: 26 October 1994 (age 32) Lautoka, Fiji
- Height: 195 cm (6 ft 5 in)
- Weight: 110 kg (243 lb; 17 st 5 lb)
- School: Central College Lautoka

Rugby union career
- Position(s): Number 8, Flanker, Lock
- Current team: Clermont
Senior career
Years	Team	Apps	(Points)
2017–2023	Taranaki	47	(30)
2018–2023	Chiefs	66	(55)
2023–	Clermont	40	(30)
- Correct as of 8 November 2025
International career
Years	Team	Apps	(Points)
2022	New Zealand	2	(5)
2025–	Fiji	1	(0)
- Correct as of 8 November 2025

Pita Gus Nacagilevu Sowakula (/soʊˈwɑːˈkuːlə/; born 26 October 1994) is a professional rugby union who plays primarily in the back row for Top 14 club Clermont and the Fiji national team. He played two test matches for the All Blacks in 2022 and has also represented Fiji in international basketball.

== Early life ==
Pita Gus Nacagilevu Sowakula was born on 26 October 1994 in Lautoka, a son of Selina Balenacagi and nephew of Ropate Robanakadavu. Growing up, Robanakadavu raised Sowakula when he was only eight months old after his mother was in school. He attended Suva Grammar School and Central College Lautoka, where he learned to play basketball and rugby union. After secondary school, Sowakula was chosen to play for the Nadro rugby league team that toured Brisbane and was named in the Fiji Residents representative side. He was also a member of the Fiji national sevens training squad during their preparation towards the 2016 Summer Olympics in Rio de Janeiro.

In the most part of Sowakula's early basketball career, he played predominantly as an amateur in Fiji. He featured for the Raiwaqa-based Boston White side, playing in local Fijian tournaments such as the Raiwaqa Basketball Super League. His form saw him make his international debut during the Oceania Youth Championship competition in Melbourne in 2012. He was also selected to be part of the Oceania Youth All Stars and the Oceania Open team in the same year whilst winning a bronze medal.

== Basketball career ==
Pita Gus Sowakula
Career information
- College: Iowa Central Community
- Playing career: 2012–2017
- Position: Center
- Number: 15, 24

Career history
- 2015: Fiji

Career highlights
- FIBA Oceania Youth All Stars (2012); FIBA Oceania All Stars (2013)
Medals
Men's basketball
Representing Fiji
Pacific Games
Silver medal – second place	2015 Port Moresby	Team
FIBA Oceania U19 Championship
Bronze medal – third place	2012 Melbourne	Team

=== 2013–15 ===
In 2013, Sowakula was a member of the Fijian national basketball team that took part in the Oceania Championships in New Zealand where he was also awarded the best player of the tournament, making the competitions All Stars side. His performances during the competition led to him being scouted by Iowa Central Community College for the following year. He joined siblings Milika and Mataika Koyamainavure after Fiji Basketball development officer Laisiasa Puamau confirmed the news in May 2014.

Sowakula was brought into the Otago Nuggets to participate in their 2014 campaign after a respectable showing at the Oceania Championships in New Zealand. Player-coach, Mark Dickel decided to sign Sowakula to the squad as they were looking for a replacement for fellow Fijian, Marques Whippy. He suited up for the Nuggets during their match against the Taranaki Mountainairs after arriving in Dunedin the week before. He didn't live quite up to Dickel's standards after he stated his belief that Sowakula was not ready for the New Zealand National Basketball League, and instead called in former representative Tom Rowe as cover. Sowakula did not make his debut for the Nuggets.

2015 saw Fiji name a strong squad to compete in the Pacific Games in Port Moresby, Papua New Guinea in July. The side included the services of Sowakula. They defeated Papua New Guinea in the semi-final, giving them a chance to reach the World Championship Asia qualifiers. Sowakula and experienced players Marques Whippy and Joshua Fox stood out after putting together a good combination of tactics which was too much for their opposition to handle. Overall, Sowakula won a silver medal after Fiji lost to Guam in the final.

== Rugby career ==
=== 2016–18 ===
Sowakula arrived in New Zealand from Fiji at the end of 2016 after his agent promised a deal with Taranaki Rugby to place him in the union's academy. Originally a winger, he converted to the back row and represented the side's development team as they went through their representative season unbeaten, winning the northern regions competition in the process. After a stand-out year and being named one of the club players of the year for Spotswood United Rugby Club, Sowakula earned his call-up into the Taranaki Mitre 10 Cup side for their 2017 campaign. He made his debut for the province, making the match-day fifteen at blindside flanker against Waikato. Sowakula took time to adjust but produced some stand-out displays, starting in all nine appearances and scoring three tries. He also was a part of Taranaki's historic Ranfurly Shield victory over Canterbury and their impressive top of the table finish. At seasons-end Sowakula was awarded most promising player of the year for the union.

Sowakula was signed short-term for the Chiefs in their 2018 Super Rugby season. He joined during the sides injury crisis after season-ending injuries to Dominic Bird, Mitchell Brown and Fin Hoeata. Sowakula was named in the reserves against the Highlanders in Hamilton in cover of locks Brodie Retallick and Tyler Ardron. He made his first appearance in the competition replacing Liam Messam in the 66th minute. Sowakula made a further six appearances for the franchise.

In August 2018, Sowakula returned to play for Taranaki in a Ranfurly Shield defense against Manawatu. He was involved in an accidental head collision with Counties Manukau captain Sam Henwood in Pukekohe. Sowakula was unaffected by the incident but Henwood was taken to the hospital after suffering a concussion. He was later ruled out for the remainder of the season after sustaining a minor shoulder injury. Sowakula received three Duane Monkley Medal points for his performance against Auckland but featured in a disappointing Taranaki campaign that finished in last place.

=== 2019–2022 ===
Sowakula rejoined the Chiefs squad for their upcoming season after head coach Colin Cooper named his inclusion during the 2019 Super Rugby side announcement in October 2018. He made consecutive appearances from the reserves and started at both flanker and number 8 after being called up midway through the year once recovered from an injury that had him earlier sidelined. Sowakula scored his maiden Super Rugby try against the Reds in Hamilton and lead the game in most individual tackles with 25. He was also named in SANZAAR round fifteen team of the week after making the most tackles of any player, scoring a try and was the only forward in the round to make multiple clean breaks in his performance against the Reds.

Near the end of his second season with the Chiefs, Sowakula made comment on possible selection for the Fiji national team for their 2019 Rugby World Cup squad. After discussions with coach John McKee, he chose not to make himself available. In August 2019, he received player of the match and picked up three Duane Monkley Medal points in his return to the Mitre 10 Cup competition with Taranaki against Manawatu. He would later overcome a minor injury sustained against Northland to be reselected for a Ranfurly Shield challenge against Otago midway into the season. Sowakula scored his fourth domestic try in a defeat to Waikato in Hamilton.

In 2021, Sowakula had another strong season for the Chiefs. After receiving a call-up to the Chiefs midway through the 2018 season, the 1.95m, 110 kg forward has made 33 appearances for the club. He was a notable performer during the team’s 2020 season and returned to form in 2021 following an injury.

In 2022, Sowakulas was in excellent form for the Chiefs and lead him to being named in the All Blacks squad for the Ireland series. His impressive performances in 2018 earned him a full-time spot in the Chiefs and since then has been a regular face in the match day 23. His performances in the 2022 DHL Super Rugby Pacific Season has seen many take note of the powerful number 8, who impressed with his work-rate and explosive ball carrying. The All Blacks won the first test with Sowakula coming off the bench and scoring on his debut against Ireland as the All Blacks won 42-19. His second test appearance would be disappointing as the All Blacks lost 30-24. Sowakula had less of an impact knocking on a first up pass and was dropped for the 3rd test which was lost 32-22 to Ireland. The sacking of All Black assistant coaches Brad Mooar and John Plumtree in the aftermath of the Irish series and the hiring of Jason Ryan as forwards coach would impact Sowakula. When the Rugby Championship squad was named Sowakula's name was missing. Shannon Frizell was named in the squad with Sowakula being the man to make way after two shaky appearances off the bench in the first two tests against Ireland – despite scoring a try off the back of the scrum at Eden Park he dropped the first passes to come his way in both games. Sowakula returned to Taranaki and the NPC in the hopes of rediscovering his form. However he suffered a knee injury during the competition and his match time was curtailed. When the wider squads for the All Blacks and NZ 15 teams Northern Hemisphere tour were named he was not included in the top 60 players. Two appearances off the bench mark the extent of Sowakula's international career to date after missing selection in both the Rugby Championship and upcoming Northern Tour. Ryan explained that the wealth of competition for loose forward positions was all that separated Sowakula from a return to the jersey, saying that based on form, other players were better suited to the upcoming tour.

After being dropped by the All Black selectors, Sowakula made the decision to head overseas after the 2023 season. In December 2022 he signed a two year contract for Clermont beginning 2023 - 2024 season, with an option of a third, and comes into a squad desperate for a big ball-carrying number eight with Samoan international Fritz Lee set to leave the side

=== 2023 ===
In his final season Sowakula made 16 appearances for the Chiefs where they made the Super Rugby final losing to the Crusaders. Sowakula made 12 appearances for Taranaki in the NPC, helping them make the NPC final defeating Hawkes Bay. Sowakula did not make the All Blacks squad for the Rugby World Cup.

=== 2025 ===
In October 2025, Sowakula was named in the Flying Fijians squad for the 2025 end-of-year rugby union internationals re-igniting his international career after standing down for 3 years to become eligible for Fiji. In November 2025, he made his debut in a defeat against England.

== Statistics ==
Club	Year	Competition	GP	GS	TRY	CON	PEN	DGL	PTS	WL%	Yellow card	Red card
Taranaki	2017†	Bunnings NPC (incl. Ranfurly Shield)	9	9	3	0	0	0	15	88.89	0	0
Taranaki	2018	Bunnings NPC (incl. Ranfurly Shield)	7	5	0	0	0	0	0	28.57	0	0
Taranaki	2019	Bunnings NPC (incl. Ranfurly Shield)	9	9	1	0	0	0	5	44.44	0	0
Taranaki	2020†	Bunnings NPC (incl. Ranfurly Shield)	6	5	0	0	0	0	0	33.33	0	0
Taranaki	2021†	Bunnings NPC (incl. Ranfurly Shield)	9	9	1	0	0	0	5	100.00	0	0
Chiefs	2018	Super Rugby Pacific	7	4	0	0	0	0	0	57.14	0	0
Chiefs	2019	Super Rugby Pacific	8	5	1	0	0	0	5	62.50	0	0
Chiefs	2020	Super Rugby Pacific	13	11	1	0	0	0	5	23.08	0	0
Chiefs	2021	Super Rugby Pacific	11	7	2	0	0	0	10	72.73	0	0
Chiefs	2022	Super Rugby Pacific	14	13	5	0	0	0	25	71.43	0	0
Career			93	77	14	0	0	0	70	59.14	0	0

Updated: 12 June 2022 Source: Pita G Sowakula Rugby History
