= 2022 FIBA Micronesian Cup =

1st FIBA Micronesian Cup

Tournament details
- Host country: Guam
- City: Mangilao
- Dates: 8–11 June 2022
- Teams: 4 (from 1 sub-confederation)
- Venue: 1 (in 1 host city)

Final positions
- Champions: Guam (1st title)
- Runners-up: Palau
- Third place: Northern Mariana Islands

Tournament statistics
- Top scorer: (Northern Mariana Islands) Santos (22.8 ppg)
- Top rebounds: (Northern Mariana Islands) Santos (13.0 rpg)
- Top assists: (Guam) Grape (5.3 apg)
- PPG (Team): Guam (107.5 ppg)
- RPG (Team): Guam (56.3 rpg)
- APG (Team): Guam (21.3 apg)

Official website
- www.fiba.basketball/history

The 2022 FIBA Micronesian Cup was the inaugural edition of the FIBA Micronesian Cup, an international men's basketball tournament contested by national teams of Micronesian sub-zone of FIBA Oceania. It was played in Mangilao, Guam, from 8 to 11 June 2022. The hosting has been awarded by FIBA following the decision to postpone the 2022 Micronesian Games to 2023, which was the qualification phase for 2023 Pacific Games.

This tournament also served as a sub-regional qualification for the men's basketball event of the 2023 Pacific Games in Solomon Islands with one berth allocated in this tournament, which serves as the official qualifier to the FIBA Asia Cup Pre-Qualifiers.

Guam won the tournament by sweeping all of their opponents en route to the championship, enabling them to become the representative of Micronesian sub-zone in the men's basketball tournament of the 2023 Pacific Games.

== Participating teams ==
Initially there are seven teams that were supposed to participate in the competition. On 24 March, Marshall Islands and Kiribati has sent their apologies as they will not be able to participate due to travel restrictions imposed amidst the COVID-19 pandemic. The remaining four teams later confirmed their participation.

- Federated States of Micronesia
- Guam (Host)
- ~~Kiribati~~ **
- ~~Marshall Islands~~ **
- ~~Nauru~~ **
- Northern Mariana Islands
- Palau

** Withdrew

== Group phase ==
All times are local (Chamorro Standard Time; UTC+10).

Pos	Team	Pld	W	L	PF	PA	PD	Pts	Qualification
1	Guam (H)	3	3	0	337	140	+197	6	Final
2	Palau	3	2	1	204	204	0	5	Final
3	Northern Mariana Islands	3	1	2	189	269	−80	4	Third place match
4	Federated States of Micronesia	3	0	3	171	288	−117	3	Third place match

Source: FIBA
Rules for classification: 1) Points; 2) Head-to-head results; 3) Points difference; 4) Points scored.
(H) Hosts

8 June 2022
12:15

Boxscore

Federated States of Micronesia	50–74	Palau
Scoring by quarter: 10–20, 12–23, 16–14, 12–17
Pts: Bisalen 11; Rebs: Bisalen 11; Asts: Bisalen, Sebastian 2		Pts: Rudi 13; Rebs: Worswick 12; Asts: Worswick 6

University of Guam Field House, Mangilao

8 June 2022
19:00

Boxscore

Guam	113–45	Northern Mariana Islands
Scoring by quarter: 21–7, 29–7, 26–13, 37–18
Pts: Borja 21; Rebs: Borja 13; Asts: Grape 8		Pts: Santos 21; Rebs: Santos 10; Asts: dela Cruz 2

University of Guam Field House, Mangilao

9 June 2022
14:30

Boxscore

Northern Mariana Islands	57–72	Palau
Scoring by quarter: 14–24, 15–16, 16–12, 12–20
Pts: Santos 27; Rebs: Guerrero 13; Asts: Guerrero 5		Pts: Rudi 16; Rebs: Timarong 14; Asts: Worswick 5

University of Guam Field House, Mangilao

9 June 2022
16:45

Boxscore

Guam	127–37	Federated States of Micronesia
Scoring by quarter: 32–1, 25–10, 37–18, 33–10
Pts: Borja 21; Rebs: Borja, Sakazaki 9 Asts: Calvo 8		Pts: Palik 10; Rebs: Bisalen 9 Asts: Palik 2

University of Guam Field House, Mangilao

10 June 2022
12:15

Boxscore

Federated States of Micronesia	84–87 (OT)	Northern Mariana Islands
Scoring by quarter: 16–17, 20–17, 18–27, 19–12, Overtime: 11–14
Pts: Weilbacher 26; Rebs: Bisalen 16; Asts: Palik, Martin 4		Pts: dela Cruz 31; Rebs: Santos 15; Asts: Santos 7

University of Guam Field House, Mangilao

10 June 2022
19:00

Boxscore

Palau	58–97	Guam
Scoring by quarter: 19–39, 9–19, 20–19, 10–20
Pts: Ngiraremiang 24; Rebs: Ngiraremiang 6 Asts: Worswick 2		Pts: Blas 12; Rebs: Johnson 9 Asts: Johnson 5

University of Guam Field House, Mangilao

== Final round ==
=== Third place match ===
11 June 2022
13:30

Boxscore

Northern Mariana Islands	82–78	Federated States of Micronesia
Scoring by quarter: 14–13, 18–20, 17–17, 33–28
Pts: dela Cruz 32; Rebs: Santos 15; Asts: Santos 10		Pts: Bisalen 22; Rebs: Bisalen 14; Asts: Sebastian 7

University of Guam Field House, Mangilao

=== Final ===
11 June 2022
18:00

Boxscore

Guam	93–45	Palau
Scoring by quarter: 27–6, 31–17, 9–16, 26–6
Pts: Borja 23; Rebs: Johnson 11; Asts: Blas 5		Pts: Ngiraremiang 12; Rebs: Worswick 10; Asts: Worswick 3

University of Guam Field House, Mangilao

== Final standings ==
Rank	Team	Record
1st place, gold medalist(s)	Guam	4–0
2nd place, silver medalist(s)	Palau	2–2
3rd place, bronze medalist(s)	Northern Mariana Islands	2–2
4	Federated States of Micronesia	0–4

Qualified for the 2023 Pacific Games
