= Nigel Cluer =

Australian swimmer

Personal information
- Born: Nigel Roderick Cluer; 12 May 1953 (age 73) Gatooma, Southern Rhodesia

Sport
- Sport: Swimming
Medal record
Representing Australia
British Commonwealth Games
Silver medal – second place	1974 Christchurch	4×100 m medley
Representing Papua New Guinea
South Pacific Games
Gold medal – first place	1969 Port Moresby	100 m backstroke
Gold medal – first place	1969 Port Moresby	200 m backstroke
Gold medal – first place	1969 Port Moresby	200 m medley
Gold medal – first place	1969 Port Moresby	4x100 m medley
Gold medal – first place	1971 Papeete	100 m breaststroke
Gold medal – first place	1971 Papeete	200 m breaststroke
Gold medal – first place	1971 Papeete	200 m medley
Gold medal – first place	1971 Papeete	4x100 m medley
Gold medal – first place	1971 Papeete	4x100 m freestyle
Silver medal – second place	1969 Port Moresby	4x100 m freestyle
Silver medal – second place	1971 Papeete	100 m backstroke
Silver medal – second place	1971 Papeete	200 m freestyle
Bronze medal – third place	1966 Nouméa	4x100 m medley
Bronze medal – third place	1971 Papeete	100 m butterfly

Nigel Roderick Cluer (born 12 May 1953) is an Australian former swimmer.

== Biography ==
Cluer, Southern Rhodesian by birth, spent most of his early childhood in Tanzania and later attended Sydney's Barker College as well as Port Moresby High School in pre-independence Papua New Guinea. He represented Papua New Guinea for the majority of his swimming career.

A three-time participant at the South Pacific Games, Cluer's first appearance was as a 14-year old in 1966 and he claimed a bronze medal in the medley relay. He won four gold medals at the 1969 South Pacific Games in Port Moresby and a further five at the 1971 South Pacific Games in Papeete.

Cluer was a member of the Papua New Guinean squad for the 1970 British Commonwealth Games in Edinburgh, but had to withdraw after contracting mumps. He was the only Papua New Guinea swimmer to feature at the 1973 World Championships, where he came fifth in the 200 metre breaststroke.

In 1974, Cluer represented Australia at the British Commonwealth Games in Christchurch, as Papua New Guinea opted not to send a team. He swam breaststroke for the silver medal-winning 4 × 100 m medley relay team.

Cluer, a dentist by profession, attended the University of Wisconsin on a swimming scholarship.
