= Papua New Guinea women's national 3x3 team =

National 3x3 basketball team

Papua New Guinea
- Joined FIBA: 1963
- FIBA zone: FIBA Oceania
- National federation: Basketball Federation of Papua New Guinea
Home	Away

PNG women's 3x3 team
Medal record

Pacific Games
Silver medal – second place	2017 Port Vila	Team

The Papua New Guinea women's national 3x3 team is a national basketball team of Papua New Guinea. It is managed by the Basketball Federation of Papua New Guinea (BFPNG) and represents the country in international 3x3 basketball competitions, including at the Pacific Games. The team won a silver medal at the 2017 Pacific Mini Games.

== See also ==
- Papua New Guinea women's national basketball team
- Papua New Guinea women's national under-19 basketball team
