= Basketball at the 1966 South Pacific Games =

The 1966 South Pacific Games was the second time that basketball was played at the South Pacific Games. Nine teams competed in the men's competition while for the first time a women's competition took place with five teams competing in the women's tournaments.

French Polynesia took out both gold medals with the national team defeating New Caledonia in the men's final while they defeated Papua New Guinea in the women's.

== Medal summary ==
| Event | Gold | Silver | Bronze |
|---|---|---|---|
| Men's | Tahiti | New Caledonia | Guam |
| Women's | Tahiti | Papua New Guinea | Fiji |

== Men's tournament ==
=== Group stage ===
==== Group A ====
| Team | Pld | W | L | PF | PA | PD | Pts |
|---|---|---|---|---|---|---|---|
| Tahiti | 4 | 4 | 0 | 240 | 113 | +127 | 8 |
| Papua New Guinea | 4 | 3 | 1 | 237 | 181 | +56 | 7 |
| Gilbert and Ellice Islands | 4 | 2 | 2 | 213 | 199 | +14 | 6 |
| Fiji | 4 | 1 | 3 | 222 | 208 | +14 | 5 |
| New Hebrides | 4 | 0 | 4 | 66 | 277 | –211 | 4 |

December 1966

| Tahiti | 91–51 | Papua New Guinea |

Nouméa, New Caledonia

December 1966

| Tahiti | 72–27 | Gilbert and Ellice Islands |

Nouméa, New Caledonia

December 1966

| Tahiti | 77–35 | Fiji |

Nouméa, New Caledonia

December 1966

| Tahiti | 2–0 | New Hebrides |

Nouméa, New Caledonia

December 1966

| Papua New Guinea | 59–50 | Gilbert and Ellice Islands |

Nouméa, New Caledonia

December 1966

| Papua New Guinea | 60–28 | Fiji |

Nouméa, New Caledonia

December 1966

| Papua New Guinea | 67–12 | New Hebrides |

Nouméa, New Caledonia

December 1966

| Gilbert and Ellice Islands | 44–41 | Fiji |

Nouméa, New Caledonia

December 1966

| Gilbert and Ellice Islands | 92–27 | New Hebrides |

Nouméa, New Caledonia

December 1966

| Fiji | 118–27 | New Hebrides |

Nouméa, New Caledonia

==== Group B ====
| Team | Pld | W | L | PF | PA | PD | Pts |
|---|---|---|---|---|---|---|---|
| New Caledonia | 3 | 3 | 0 | 180 | 119 | +59 | 6 |
| Guam | 3 | 2 | 1 | 159 | 120 | +39 | 5 |
| American Samoa | 3 | 1 | 2 | 127 | 178 | –51 | 4 |
| Nauru | 3 | 0 | 3 | 139 | 188 | –49 | 3 |

December 1966

| New Caledonia | 45–33 | Guam |

Nouméa, New Caledonia

December 1966

| New Caledonia | 64–34 | American Samoa |

Nouméa, New Caledonia

December 1966

| New Caledonia | 71–52 | Nauru |

Nouméa, New Caledonia

December 1966

| Guam | 64–38 | American Samoa |

Nouméa, New Caledonia

December 1966

| Guam | 62–37 | Nauru |

Nouméa, New Caledonia

December 1966

| American Samoa | 55–50 | Nauru |

Nouméa, New Caledonia

=== Knockout stage ===
Semi-finals
Tahiti | 58
Guam | 42
New Caledonia | 47
Papua New Guinea | 36

Final
Tahiti | 42
New Caledonia | 23
Third place
Guam | 63
Papua New Guinea | 47

== Women's tournament ==
=== Round robin ===
| Team | Pld | W | L | PF | PA | PD | Pts |

=== Knockout stage ===
Semi-finals
Tahiti | 53
Fiji | 47
Papua New Guinea | 40
New Caledonia | 19

Final
Tahiti | 35
Papua New Guinea | 31
Third place
Fiji | 42
New Caledonia | 30
