= 2022 FIBA Women's Micronesian Cup =

1st FIBA Women's Micronesian Cup

Tournament details
- Host country: Guam
- City: Mangilao
- Dates: 8–11 June 2022
- Teams: 4 (from 1 sub-confederation)
- Venue: 1 (in 1 host city)

Final positions
- Champions: Guam (1st title)
- Runners-up: Northern Mariana Islands
- Third place: Palau

Tournament statistics
- Top scorer: (Northern Mariana Islands) E. Won (18.5 ppg)
- Top rebounds: (Northern Mariana Islands) E. Won (15.0 rpg)
- Top assists: (Northern Mariana Islands) E. Won (5.8 apg)
- PPG (Team): Guam (94.5 ppg)
- RPG (Team): Palau (58.5 rpg)
- APG (Team): Guam (18.0 apg)

Official website
- www.fiba.basketball/history

The 2022 FIBA Women's Micronesian Cup was the inaugural edition of the FIBA Micronesian Cup, an international women's basketball tournament contested by national teams of Micronesian sub-zone of FIBA Oceania. It was played in Mangilao, Guam, from 8 to 11 June 2022. The hosting has been awarded by FIBA following the decision to postpone the 2022 Micronesian Games to 2023, which was the qualification phase for 2023 Pacific Games.

This tournament also served as a sub-regional qualification for the women's basketball event of the 2023 Pacific Games in Solomon Islands with one berth allocated in this tournament, which serves as the official qualifier to the FIBA Asia Cup Pre-Qualifiers.

Guam won the tournament by sweeping all of their opponents en route to the championship, enabling them to become the representative of Micronesian sub-zone in the women's basketball tournament of the 2023 Pacific Games.

== Participating teams ==
Initially there are seven teams that were supposed to participate in the competition. On 24 March, Marshall Islands and Kiribati has sent their apologies as they will not be able to participate due to travel restrictions imposed amidst the COVID-19 pandemic. The remaining four teams later confirmed their participation.

- Federated States of Micronesia
- Guam (Host)
- ~~Kiribati~~ **
- ~~Marshall Islands~~ **
- ~~Nauru~~ **
- Northern Mariana Islands
- Palau

** Withdrew

== Group phase ==
All times are local (Chamorro Standard Time; UTC+10).

Pos	Team	Pld	W	L	PF	PA	PD	Pts	Qualification
1	Guam (H)	3	3	0	308	95	+213	6	Final
2	Northern Mariana Islands	3	2	1	230	175	+55	5	Final
3	Palau	3	1	2	176	180	−4	4	Third place match
4	Federated States of Micronesia	3	0	3	58	322	−264	3	Third place match

Source: FIBA
Rules for classification: 1) Points; 2) Head-to-head results; 3) Points difference; 4) Points scored.
(H) Hosts

8 June 2022
14:30

Boxscore

Federated States of Micronesia	17–87	Palau
Scoring by quarter: 6–26, 3–16, 6–31, 2–14
Pts: Andrew 6 Rebs: three players 7 Asts: Andrew 1		Pts: Singich 22; Rebs: Sugiyama 11; Asts: Sungino, Adelbai 3

University of Guam Field House, Mangilao

8 June 2022
16:45

Boxscore

Guam	94–46	Northern Mariana Islands
Scoring by quarter: 28–17, 18–14, 21–10, 27–5
Pts: San Nicolas 18; Rebs: San Nicolas 9 Asts: Stinnett 6		Pts: E. Won 15; Rebs: E. Won 9 Asts: E. Won 5

University of Guam Field House, Mangilao

9 June 2022
12:15

Boxscore

Northern Mariana Islands	74–53	Palau
Scoring by quarter: 15–16, 26–15, 15–14, 18–8
Pts: E. Won 21; Rebs: E. Won 16; Asts: E. Won, K. Won 5		Pts: Sugiyama 16; Rebs: Sugiyama 14; Asts: Sugiyama, Kalbesang 2

University of Guam Field House, Mangilao

9 June 2022
19:00

Boxscore

Guam	125–13	Federated States of Micronesia
Scoring by quarter: 30–6, 38–0, 27–2, 30–5
Pts: Quintanilla, San Nicolas 18; Rebs: three players 6 Asts: Taitano 7		Pts: Lemangmai 7 Rebs: Lemangmai, Takasy 7 Asts: 0

University of Guam Field House, Mangilao

10 June 2022
14:30

Boxscore

Federated States of Micronesia	28–110	Northern Mariana Islands
Scoring by quarter: 5–30, 2–24, 0–37, 21–19
Pts: Lemangmai 18; Rebs: Martin 7 Asts: Peter 5		Pts: E. Won 22; Rebs: E. Won 12; Asts: E. Won 14

University of Guam Field House, Mangilao

10 June 2022
16:45

Boxscore

Palau	36–89	Guam
Scoring by quarter: 9–21, 4–29, 15–19, 8–20
Pts: Adelbai, Kalbesang 11; Rebs: three players 9 Asts: Singich 2		Pts: Duenas 15; Rebs: Duenas, San Nicolas 9 Asts: Han 5

University of Guam Field House, Mangilao

== Final round ==
=== Third place match ===
11 June 2022
11:15

Boxscore

Palau	79–35	Federated States of Micronesia
Scoring by quarter: 19–11, 20-–4, 12–8, 28–12
Pts: Kalbesang 20; Rebs: Sugiyama 10; Asts: Tevid 5		Pts: Lemangmai 10; Rebs: Lemangmai 8 Asts: Takasy, Andrew 2

University of Guam Field House, Mangilao

=== Final ===
11 June 2022
15:45

Boxscore

Guam	70–37	Northern Mariana Islands
Scoring by quarter: 20–12, 22–6, 11–5, 17–14
Pts: San Nicolas 20; Rebs: San Nicolas 13; Asts: Taitano 4		Pts: E. Won 16; Rebs: E. Won 13; Asts: five players 1

University of Guam Field House, Mangilao

== Final standings ==
Rank	Team	Record
1st place, gold medalist(s)	Guam	4–0
2nd place, silver medalist(s)	Northern Mariana Islands	2–2
3rd place, bronze medalist(s)	Palau	2–2
4	Federated States of Micronesia	0–4

Qualified for the 2023 Pacific Games
