= Papua New Guinea women's national basketball team =

Papua New Guinea
- FIBA ranking: NR (14 September 2026)
- Joined FIBA: 1963
- FIBA zone: FIBA Oceania
- National federation: Basketball Federation of Papua New Guinea
- Coach: Moi Muri

Olympic Games
- Appearances: None

World Cup
- Appearances: None

FIBA Oceania Championship for Women
- Appearances: None
Home	Away

Medal record

Pacific Games
Gold medal – first place	1969 Port Moresby	Team
Gold medal – first place	1971 Papeete	Team
Gold medal – first place	1979 Papeete	Team
Gold medal – first place	1991 Port Moresby	Team
Silver medal – second place	1966 Nouméa	Team
Silver medal – second place	1975 Tumon	Team
Silver medal – second place	1983 Apia	Team
Bronze medal – third place	1987 Nouméa	Team
Bronze medal – third place	2007 Apia	Team

The Papua New Guinea women's national basketball team is the women's national basketball team of Papua New Guinea. It is managed by the Basketball Federation of Papua New Guinea (BFPNG). It has been the most successful team at the Pacific Games where it won the gold medal four times.

The team is yet to qualify for the Olympic Games, FIBA Women's World Cup, FIBA Women's Asia Cup, or Commonwealth Games.

== Tournament history ==
A red box around the year indicates tournaments played within Papua New Guinea

=== Pacific Games ===
Pacific Games record
Year	Round	Position	Pld	W	L
(New Caledonia) 1966	Final	2nd	4	3	1
(Papua New Guinea) 1969	Final	Champions	5	4	1
(French Polynesia) 1971	Final	Champions	4	4	0
(Guam) 1975	Final	2nd	4	3	1
(Fiji) 1979	Final	Champions	5	4	1
(Samoa) 1983	Final	2nd	5	3	2
(New Caledonia) 1987	Playoff	3rd	5	3	2
(Papua New Guinea) 1991	Final	Champions	5	5	0
(French Polynesia) 1995	did not participate				
(Guam) 1999	Quarterfinals	7th	7	2	5
(Fiji) 2003	Group stage	5th	6	2	4
(Samoa) 2007	Playoff	3rd	6	3	3
(New Caledonia) 2011	Quarterfinals	5th	6	4	2
(Papua New Guinea) 2015	Semi-finals	4th	6	2	4
(Samoa) 2019	Classification	7th	4	1	3
(Solomon Islands) 2023	qualified				
Total	4 Titles	14/16	72	43	29

=== Melanesia Cup ===
Melanesia Cup record
Year	Round	Position	Pld	W	L
(Papua New Guinea) 2017	Champions	1st	4	4	0
(Fiji) 2022	Runner-up	2nd	4	2	2
Total	1 Title	2/2	8	6	2

== See also ==
- Papua New Guinea women's national under-19 basketball team
- Papua New Guinea women's national under-17 basketball team
- Papua New Guinea women's national 3x3 team
