= Swimming at the 1969 South Pacific Games =

Swimming at the 1969 South Pacific Games took place in Port Moresby, the capital of Papua New Guinea on 18–22 August 1969. Fifteen South Pacific Games records were set in the finals, and one in the competition heats. Hosts Papua New Guinea won six of the ten events for men, and New Caledonia swept the pool in the women's competition, winning nine from nine events.

== Medal summary ==
=== Medal table ===
* Host nation (Papua New Guinea)

Rank	Nation	Gold	Silver	Bronze	Total
1	New Caledonia (NCL)	13	8	6	27
2	Papua New Guinea (PNG)*	6	4	7	17
3	Fiji (FIJ)	0	6	6	12
4	Guam (GUM)	0	1	0	1
Totals (4 entries)		19	19	19	57

=== Men ===
Event	Gold		Silver		Bronze	
100m Freestyle	(New Caledonia) J. Mamelin (NCL)	57.2 ^{ GR }	(Fiji) P. Wilkins (FIJ)	59.2	(New Caledonia) J. Morault (NCL)	1:00
200m Freestyle	(New Caledonia) J. Mamelin (NCL)	2:10.1 ^{ GR }	(Papua New Guinea) N. Bostock (PNG)	2:12.3	(Fiji) P. Wilkins (FIJ)	2:14.5
400m Freestyle	(Papua New Guinea) N. Bostock (PNG)	4:42.7	(New Caledonia) P. Maillot (NCL)	4:51.1	(Papua New Guinea) M. Mowen (PNG)	4:54
1500m Freestyle	(Papua New Guinea) M. Mowen (PNG)	19:09 ^{ GR }	(Papua New Guinea) N. Bostock (PNG)	19:20	(New Caledonia) P. Maillot (NCL)	19:32.9
100m Backstroke	(Papua New Guinea) N. Cluer (PNG)	1:09.4 ^{ GR }	(Fiji) D. Lane (FIJ)	1:10.1	(Papua New Guinea) D. Cluer (PNG)	1:11.3
200m Breaststroke	(Papua New Guinea) N. Cluer (PNG)	2:50.2 ^{ GR }	(Guam) D. Garrison (GUM)	2:56	(Papua New Guinea) J. Tovitolon (PNG)	3:00.2
100m Butterfly	(New Caledonia) T. Ruyer (NCL)	1:07.8	(Papua New Guinea) M. Mowen (PNG)	1:08	(Papua New Guinea) K. Pini (PNG)	1:09.7
200m I.M.	(Papua New Guinea) N. Cluer (PNG)	2:27 ^{ GR }	(New Caledonia) T. Ruyer (NCL)	2:32.1	(Papua New Guinea) M. Mowen (PNG)	2:35.1
4 × 100 m Medley relay	Papua New Guinea	4:36.1 ^{ GR }	New Caledonia	4:39.5	Fiji	4:53.9
4 × 100 m Freestyle relay	New Caledonia	4:01.4	Papua New Guinea	4:05.7	Fiji	4:10

=== Women ===
Event	Gold		Silver		Bronze	
100m Freestyle	(New Caledonia) S. Hanner (NCL)	1:04.9 ^{ GR }	(New Caledonia) M. Anewy (NCL)	1:05.4	(New Caledonia) M. Kersaudy (NCL)	1:05.5
200m Freestyle	not contested					
400m Freestyle	(New Caledonia) M. Kersaudy (NCL)	4:55.1 ^{ GR }	(New Caledonia) M. Anewy (NCL)	4:59.5	(New Caledonia) C. Legras (NCL)	5:02.7
800m Freestyle	(New Caledonia) M. Kersaudy (NCL)	10:03.8 ^{ GR }	(New Caledonia) M. Anewy (NCL)	10:05	(New Caledonia) C. Legras (NCL)	10:26.2
100m Backstroke	(New Caledonia) M. Kersaudy (NCL)	1:14.9 ^{ GR }	(Fiji) O. Pickering (FIJ)	1:15.1	(New Caledonia) D. Anewy (NCL)	1:17.3
200m Breaststroke	(New Caledonia) C. Hermonot (NCL)	3:15.8	(Fiji) O. Pickering (FIJ)	3:18.8	(Fiji) J. Murphy (FIJ)	3:19.2
100m Butterfly	(New Caledonia) M. Kersaudy (NCL)	1:14.1 ^{ GR }	(New Caledonia) S. Hanner (NCL)	1:14.2	(Fiji) O. Pickering (FIJ)	1:19.7
200m I.M.	(New Caledonia) M. Kersaudy (NCL)	2:42.1 ^{ GR }	(New Caledonia) S. Hanner (NCL)	2:46.4	(Fiji) O. Pickering (FIJ)	2:48
4 × 100 m Medley relay	New Caledonia	5:15.1 ^{ GR }	Fiji	5:21.4	Papua New Guinea	5:32.5
4 × 100 m Freestyle relay	New Caledonia	4:30.9 ^{ GR }	Fiji	4:42.8	Papua New Guinea	4:43

== Notes ==
^{GR} denotes South Pacific Games record time.

== Participating countries ==
Teams entered in the swimming competition included:

- Fiji
- Guam
- New Caledonia
- Papua New Guinea
