= 2026 FIBA Micronesian Cup =

2nd FIBA Micronesian Cup

Tournament details
- Host country: Guam
- City: Mangilao
- Dates: 14–16 August 2026
- Teams: 3 (from 1 sub-confederation)
- Venue: 1 (in 1 host city)

Final positions
- Champions: Federated States of Micronesia (1st title)
- Runners-up: Palau

Official website
- 2026 FIBA Micronesian Cup

The 2026 FIBA Micronesian Cup was the second edition of the FIBA Micronesian Cup, an international men's basketball tournament contested by national teams of Micronesian sub-zone of FIBA Oceania. It was played in Mangilao, Guam, from 14 to 16 August 2026. This was the return of the competition to Guam after hosting the previous edition 4 years ago. The tournament, which was also held simultaneously with the 2026 FIBA Women's Micronesian Cup, was a sub-regional qualification for the men's basketball event of the 2027 Pacific Games in Tahiti.

After the two-legged playoff, Federated States of Micronesia clinched their maiden tournament championship and became the subzone representative of Micronesia to the 2027 Pacific Games.

== Participating teams ==
- Federated States of Micronesia
- Guam (Host)
- Palau

== Competition format ==
This edition's competition format was different as to that of the previous edition, as the championship was only contested between Federated States of Micronesia and Palau using the aggregate scoring playoff. The two-legged battle will start after each team plays with the hosts Guam on the first day of the tournament. The winner of the two-legged playoff will clinch the lone spot and will represent Micronesia at the 2027 Pacific Games.

Due to Guam already qualified to the 2029 FIBA Asia Cup Qualifiers by virtue of their performance in the previous cycle, they can no longer participate in this tournament or to the Pacific Games as an official contender; instead they will use this competition for their younger athletes' exposure to international competition, thus they will only participate to play friendlies with the other two teams.

== Group phase ==
All times are local (Chamorro Standard Time; UTC+10).

Pos	Team	Pld	W	L	PF	PA	PD	Pts
1	Guam (H)	2	2	0	194	138	+56	4
2	Palau	1	0	1	75	102	−27	1
3	Federated States of Micronesia	1	0	1	63	92	−29	1

Source: FIBA
(H) Hosts

14 August 2026
12:00

Boxscore

Guam	92–63	Federated States of Micronesia
Scoring by quarter: 27−15, 15−18, 25−9, 25−21
Pts: Grape 24; Rebs: Johnson 14; Asts: Johnson 5		Pts: Boylan 20; Rebs: Adams 15; Asts: Boylan, Yamada 3

University of Guam Field House, Mangilao

14 August 2026
19:30

Boxscore

Palau	75–102	Guam
Scoring by quarter: 19−30, 16−32, 20−15, 20−25
Pts: Worswick 11; Rebs: Seid 6 Asts: Ngirchemat 5		Pts: Conner 23; Rebs: Johnson, Fegurgur 8 Asts: Johnson, Borja, Osborn 3

University of Guam Field House, Mangilao

== Two-legged Playoff ==
All times are local (Chamorro Standard Time; UTC+10).

Team 1	Agg.	Team 2	1st leg	2nd leg
Palau	139–151	Federated States of Micronesia	68–80	71–71

15 August 2026
19:30

Boxscore

Federated States of Micronesia	80–68	Palau
Scoring by quarter: 20−20, 28−18, 18−15, 14−15
Pts: Adams 18; Rebs: Adams 16; Asts: Pluhs 5		Pts: Worswick 20; Rebs: Seid, Worswick 6 Asts: 3 players 4

University of Guam Field House, Mangilao

16 August 2026
17:00

Boxscore

Palau	71–71	Federated States of Micronesia
Scoring by quarter: 13−13, 16−21, 32−15, 10−22
Pts: Ngiraremiang 25; Rebs: Timarong 8 Asts: Kingzio, Worswick 5		Pts: Barbosa, Adams 18; Rebs: Adams 20; Asts: Boylan 5

University of Guam Field House, Mangilao

== Final standings ==
Qualified for the 2027 Pacific Games

Rank	Team
1st place, gold medalist(s)	Federated States of Micronesia
2nd place, silver medalist(s)	Palau

== Awards ==
2026 FIBA Micronesia Cup champions

Federated States of Micronesia
1st title

The awards were announced on 16 August 2026.

All-Tournament Team
Guards	Forwards	Center
(Palau) Wallace Worswick (Palau) Jerry Ngiraremiang	(Federated States of Micronesia) Connor Boylan (Guam) Chris Conner	(Federated States of Micronesia) Noah Adams
