= Nauru men's national basketball team =

Nauru
- FIBA ranking: NR (3 March 2026)
- Joined FIBA: 1975
- FIBA zone: FIBA Oceania
- National federation: Nauru Island Basketball Association

FIBA Oceania Championship
- Appearances: None

Pacific Games
- Appearances: 8
- Medals: None

Oceania Basketball Tournament
- Appearances: 1 (2001)
- Medals: None
Home	Away

The Nauru national basketball team is the team that represents Nauru in international basketball. It is a member of FIBA Oceania. The national team was inactive in international competitive basketball for several years after participating in the 2001 Oceania Basketball Tournament in Fiji. Nauru initially planned to send a squad to the 2005 South Pacific Mini Games but withdrew due to undisclosed reasons. Eventually, it returned for the 2015 Pacific Games.

Nauru had its best performance at the 1969 Pacific Games when it beat the Solomon Islands, which has almost 60 times Nauru's population, and Fiji, which has almost 100 times Nauru's population.

== Current roster ==
At the 2015 Pacific Games: (last publicized squad)

Nauru men's national basketball team roster
Players
Coaches

Pos.	No.	Name	Age – Date of birth	Height	Club	Ctr.
	4	Dick Royce	–
	5	Kaairo Tiaon	–
	6	Jencke Jeremiah	–
	7	Akash Radhakrishnan	–
	8	Heine Kanimea	–
	9	Varun Radhakrishnan	–
	10	Rohit Krishnamurthy	–
	11	David Vorbach	–
	12	Gavrick Mwareow	–
	13	Martin Detenamo	–
	14	Kingson Akibwib	–
	15	Richart Daoe	–

Head coach

- Detswamo Cherno

Assistant coaches

- Hubert Maika

Legend

- Club – describes last
  club before the tournament
- Age – describes age
  on 3 July 2015

At Nauru's last game at the 2015 Pacific Games against the Solomon Islands, Heine Kanimea was his team's top scorer as he contributed 21 of Nauru's 71 total points.

== Competitions ==
=== FIBA Oceania Championship ===
FIBA Oceania Championship Record
Year	Position	Pld	W	L
1971 to 2015	Did not enter			
Total	0 medal	0	0	0

=== Pacific Games ===
Pacific Games Record
Year	Position	Pld	W	L
(Fiji) 1963	11th place	7	0	7
(New Caledonia) 1966	8th place	5	0	5
(Papua New Guinea) 1969	5th place	7	2	5
(French Polynesia) 1971	Did not enter			
(Guam) 1975	8th place	5	0	5
(Fiji) 1979	10th place	7	1	6
(Samoa) 1983	10th place	5	0	5
(New Caledonia) 1971	Did not enter			
(Papua New Guinea) 1991	8th place	5	0	5
(French Polynesia) 1995	Did not enter			
(Guam) 1999	14th place	5	0	5
2003 to 2011	Did not enter			
(Papua New Guinea) 2015	10th place	6	0	6
(Samoa) 2019	Did not enter			
(Solomon Islands) 2023	To be determined			
Total	N/A	46	3	43

=== Pacific Mini Games ===
Pacific Mini Games Record
Year	Position	Pld	W	L
1981 to 1993	Not held			
(American Samoa) 1997	6th place	5	1	4
2001	Not held			
(Palau) 2005	Withdrew			
2009 to 2013	Not held			
Total	N/s	5	1	4

=== Oceania Basketball Tournament ===
Oceania Tournament Record
Year	Position	Pld	W	L
1981 to 1997	Did not enter			
(Fiji) 2001	11th place	7	0	7
(Northern Mariana Islands) 2009	Did not enter			
Total	N/s	5	1	4

== See also ==
- Nauru women's national basketball team
