= William Stinnett =

Guamanian basketball player (born 1985)

Personal information
- Born: December 17, 1985 (age 40) Guam
- Listed height: 188 cm (6 ft 2 in)

Career information
- High school: Father Dueñas Memorial School (Mangilao, Guam)
- College: Wenatchee Valley CC (2004–2006)
- Playing career: 2016–2016
- Position: Point guard

Career history
- 2016: Hawke's Bay Hawks
Medals
Representing Guam
Pacific Games
Gold medal – first place	2015 Papua New Guinea	Team
Gold medal – first place	2019 Samoa	Team

William "Willie" Eugene Stinnett III (born December 17, 1985) is a Guamanian basketball player. He is a point guard for the Guam national basketball team.

== High school and college ==
Stinnett graduated from Father Dueñas Memorial School in Guam in 2004. He subsequently moved to the United States, where he played two seasons of college basketball for Wenatchee Valley College. His sophomore year was cut short after he sustained a season-ending injury in December 2005. He later played college basketball in the Philippines as well.

== Professional career ==
In September 2015, Stinnett auditioned for the Hawke's Bay Hawks and other teams during a tour of New Zealand that followed Guam's bronze medal performance at the 2015 FIBA 3x3 Oceania Championships in Australia. The tryout was successful, and in December 2015, he signed with the Hawks for the 2016 New Zealand NBL season. He appeared in 17 of the Hawks' 18 games in 2016, averaging 7.6 points, 4.4 rebounds and 2.1 assists per game.

== National team career ==
Stinnett made his debut for the Guam national basketball team in 2005. In July 2015, he captained Team Guam to the gold medal at the Pacific Games in Port Moresby, Papua New Guinea. In the gold-medal match against Fiji, Stinnett recorded 18 points, seven rebounds, two assists and one steal in a 78–61 win.
