= 2026 FIBA Women's Micronesian Cup =

2nd FIBA Women's Micronesian Cup

Tournament details
- Host country: Guam
- City: Mangilao
- Dates: 14–16 August 2026
- Teams: 3 (from 1 sub-confederation)
- Venue: 1 (in 1 host city)

Final positions
- Champions: Guam (2nd title)
- Runners-up: Federated States of Micronesia
- Third place: Palau

Official website
- 2026 FIBA Women's Micronesian Cup

The 2026 FIBA Women's Micronesian Cup was the second edition of the FIBA Micronesian Cup, an international women's basketball tournament contested by national teams of Micronesian sub-zone of FIBA Oceania. It was held in Mangilao, Guam, from 14 to 16 August 2026. This was the return of the competition to Guam after hosting the previous edition 4 years ago. The tournament, which was also held simultaneously with the men's 2026 FIBA Micronesian Cup, was a sub-regional qualification for the women's basketball event of the 2027 Pacific Games in Tahiti.

Guam successfully defended their title and won their second straight championship after sweeping the tournament. Together with the runner-up Federated States of Micronesia, they clinched the two spots allocated for Micronesia and qualified for the women's basketball event of the 2027 Pacific Games.

== Participating teams ==
- Federated States of Micronesia
- Guam (Host)
- Palau

== Competition format ==
This edition's competition format was the same as that of the previous edition. The tournament was played in a round-robin format, wherein teams played each other. At the end of the three-day competition, the top two finishers clinched the allocated spots and will represent Micronesia at the 2027 Pacific Games.

== Group phase ==
All times are local (Chamorro Standard Time; UTC+10).

Pos	Team	Pld	W	L	PF	PA	PD	Pts
1	Guam (H)	2	2	0	252	81	+171	4
2	Federated States of Micronesia	2	1	1	102	143	−41	3
3	Palau	2	0	2	70	200	−130	2

Source: FIBA
(H) Hosts

14 August 2026
16:30

Report

Palau	33–58	Federated States of Micronesia
Scoring by quarter: 13−18, 6−11, 5−19, 9−10
Pts: Misech 9 Rebs: Chiokai 9 Asts: Ngiraboi 3		Pts: Yamada 14; Rebs: Amor 19; Asts: Amor 8

University of Guam Field House, Mangilao

15 August 2026
17:00

Report

Federated States of Micronesia	44–110	Guam
Scoring by quarter: 8−29, 11−20, 6−31, 19−30
Pts: Lane 14; Rebs: Panuelo 16; Asts: Amor, V.T. Helgenberger 3		Pts: San Nicolas, Pangilinan 20; Rebs: San Nicolas 6 Asts: Taitano 7

University of Guam Field House, Mangilao

16 August 2026
19:30

Report

Guam	142–37	Palau
Scoring by quarter: 42−7, 28−11, 34−6, 38−13
Pts: Pangilinan 23; Rebs: San Nicolas 12; Asts: San Nicolas 6		Pts: Ketebengang 10; Rebs: Ketebengang 7 Asts: Ngiraboi 5

University of Guam Field House, Mangilao

== Final standings ==
Qualified for the 2027 Pacific Games

Rank	Team	Record
1st place, gold medalist(s)	Guam	2–0
2nd place, silver medalist(s)	Federated States of Micronesia	1–1
3rd place, bronze medalist(s)	Palau	0–2

== Awards ==
2026 FIBA Women's Micronesia Cup champions

Guam
2nd title

The awards were announced on 16 August 2026.

All-Tournament Team
Guards	Forwards	Center
(Federated States of Micronesia) Sylvania Amor (Federated States of Micronesia) Leila Lane	(Guam) Elysia Perez (Guam) Joylyn Pangilinan	(Guam) Mia San Nicolas
