= Papua New Guinea men's national basketball team =

Papua New Guinea
- FIBA ranking: 154 ▼3 (1 September 2026)
- Joined FIBA: 1963
- FIBA zone: FIBA Oceania
- National federation: Basketball Federation of Papua New Guinea
- Coach: Joel Khalu

Olympic Games
- Appearances: None

FIBA World Cup
- Appearances: None

FIBA Asia Cup
- Appearances: None
Home	Away

Medal record

Pacific Games
Silver medal – second place	1969 Port Moresby	Team
Bronze medal – third place	1963 Suva	Team
Bronze medal – third place	1971 Papeete	Team

The Papua New Guinea national basketball team represents Papua New Guinea in international basketball and is a member of FIBA Oceania. It is administered by the Basketball Federation of Papua New Guinea.

The team is yet to qualify for the Olympic Games, FIBA World Cup, FIBA Asia Cup, or Commonwealth Games.

== Tournament history ==
A red box around the year indicates tournaments played within Papua New Guinea

=== Pacific Games ===
Pacific Games record
Year	Round	Position	Pld	W	L
(Fiji) 1963	Third playoff	3rd	7	4	3
(New Caledonia) 1966	Semi-finals	4th	6	3	3
(Papua New Guinea) 1969	Final	2nd	8	5	3
(French Polynesia) 1971	Semi-finals	3rd	5	3	2
(Guam) 1975	Playoff	5th	5	3	2
(Fiji) 1979	Semi-finals	4th	7	4	3
(Samoa) 1983	Playoff	5th	6	4	2
(New Caledonia) 1987	Playoff	6th	6	1	5
(Papua New Guinea) 1991	Playoff	5th	6	3	3
(French Polynesia) 1995	did not participate				
(Guam) 1999	Quarterfinals	7th	8	5	3
(Fiji) 2003	Group stage	6th	3	2	1
(Samoa) 2007	did not participate				
(New Caledonia) 2011	Quarterfinals	7th	6	3	3
(Papua New Guinea) 2015	Semi-finals	4th	8	4	4
(Samoa) 2019	Semi-finals	4th	6	3	3
(Solomon Islands) 2023	Playoff	5th	5	3	2
Total	0 Titles	15/17	97	50	47

=== Melanesia Cup ===
Melanesia Cup record
Year	Round	Position	Pld	W	L
(Papua New Guinea) 2017	Champions	1st	4	4	0
(Fiji) 2022	Runner-up	2nd	4	2	2
Total	1 Title	2/2	8	6	2

== Team ==
=== Current roster ===
At the 2019 Pacific Games:

Papua New Guinea men's national basketball team roster
Players
Coaches

Pos.	No.	Name	Age – Date of birth	Height	Club	Ctr.
PG	1	Anderson Hewe	20 – 12 August 1998	1.60 m (5 ft 3 in)	Exodus BC	(Papua New Guinea)
PG	3	Coni Muri	18 – 1 March 2001	1.81 m (5 ft 11 in)	KSS Flames	(Papua New Guinea)
SG	4	Lloyd Wright	22 – 18 April 1997	1.99 m (6 ft 6 in)	Hope International University	(United States)
PG	5	Liam Wright	20 – 6 March 1999	1.88 m (6 ft 2 in)	Northeast Bushrangers	(Australia)
G	7	Moses Apiko	26 – 12 February 1993	1.84 m (6 ft 0 in)	KSS Flames	(Papua New Guinea)
SF	9	Aron Farmer	22 – 21 May 1997	1.97 m (6 ft 6 in)	Cairns Marlins	(Australia)
C	10	Junior Banduru	22 – 9 February 1997	2.05 m (6 ft 9 in)	Moniplus	(Papua New Guinea)
PF	11	Robert Kave	30 – 9 May 1989	1.91 m (6 ft 3 in)	Moniplus	(Papua New Guinea)
SF	13	Marty Leahy	22 – 9 March 1997	2.00 m (6 ft 7 in)	Ipswich Force	(Australia)
PF	14	Charles Parapa	33 – 20 April 1986	1.88 m (6 ft 2 in)	KSS Flames	(Papua New Guinea)
SF	15	Apia Muri	31 – 14 May 1988	1.90 m (6 ft 3 in)	Moniplus	(Papua New Guinea)

Head coach

- (Australia) Joel Khalu

Assistant coaches

Legend

- Club – describes last
  club before the tournament
- Age – describes age
  on 8 July 2019

At the 2019 Pacific Games, Liam Wright played most minutes for Papua New Guinea and also recorded most steals for his team.

=== Depth chart ===
Pos.	Starting 5	Bench 1	Bench 2
C	Charles Parapa	Junior Banduru
PF	Aron Farmer	Robert Kave
SF	Moses Apiko	Apia Muri
SG	Lloyd Wright	Moses Apiko
PG	Liam Wright	Coni Muri	Anderson Hewe

== Past rosters ==
At the 2015 Pacific Games:

Papua New Guinea men's national basketball team roster
Players
Coaches

Pos.	No.	Name	Age – Date of birth	Height	Club	Ctr.
	4	Lloyd James Wright	–
	5	Liam Allan Wright	–
PG	6	Purari Muri	–
	7	Gabriel Frank Elavo	–
	8	Mika John Loko	–
	9	Moses Lune Apiko	–
F	10	Wally Parapa	–	1.91 m (6 ft 3 in)
	11	Robert Avosa Kave	–
	12	Dia Muri (C)	–
G/F	13	Matineng-Iakah Leahy	–	1.90 m (6 ft 3 in)	Ipswich Force	(Australia)
	14	Aron Genai Farmer	–
F/C	15	Apia Muri	–	1.96 m (6 ft 5 in)

Head coach

- (Australia) Joel Khalu

Assistant coaches

- (Papua New Guinea) Morris Asiba

Legend

- Club – describes last
  club before the tournament
- Age – describes age
  on 3 July 2015

== Head coach position ==
- (Australia) Joel Khalu – 2013-present

== Youth national teams ==
The country features several youth national teams such as the Papua New Guinea men's national under-18 basketball team and the Papua New Guinea men's national under-17 basketball team.

== Kit ==
=== Sponsor ===
2015: City Pharmacy

2017: Pepsi

== See also ==
- Papua New Guinea women's national basketball team
- Papua New Guinea national under-19 basketball team
- Papua New Guinea national under-17 basketball team
- Papua New Guinea national 3x3 team
