= Tahiti men's national basketball team =

Tahiti (French Polynesia)
- FIBA ranking: 136 ▼2 (1 September 2026)
- Joined FIBA: 1960
- FIBA zone: FIBA Oceania
- National federation: Fédération Tahitienne de Basketball
- Coach: Hiro Tinirauarii

Olympic Games
- Appearances: None

FIBA World Cup
- Appearances: None

FIBA Oceania Championship
- Appearances: 1
- Medals: (bronze) Bronze: (1987)

Basketball at the Pacific Games
- Appearances: 15
- Medals: (gold) Gold: (1963, 1966, 1969, 1971, 1995); (silver) Silver: (1979, 2019); (bronze) Bronze: (1991, 2011, 2015)

FIBA Polynesian Basketball Cup
- Appearances: 2
- Medals: (gold) Gold: (2018, 2022)
Home

The Tahiti national basketball team is the team that represents Tahiti in international basketball and is a member of FIBA Oceania.
