= Palau men's national basketball team =

Palau
- FIBA ranking: NR (3 March 2026)
- Joined FIBA: 1988
- FIBA zone: FIBA Oceania
- National federation: Palau Amateur Basketball Association

Oceanian Championship
- Appearances: None

Pacific Games
- Appearances: None

Micronesia Cup
- Appearances: 1
- Medals: (silver) Silver: 2022
Home	Away

The Palau national basketball team represents Palau in international basketball competitions. It is administered by the Palau Amateur Basketball Association.

Palau joined the International Federation of Basketball (FIBA) in 1988 and is Oceania's youngest member.

The team appeared at the 2005 South Pacific Mini Games.

== Current roster ==
- Scout Matsutaro
- Perry Oiterong
- Silverio Tumechub
- Ziske Asanuma
- Yutaka Gibbons Jr.
- Makanani Ichiro
- Javis Pedro
- Reid Rikrik
- Wallace Rikrik
- JoJo Roberts
- Sunshine Soalablai
- Michael Williams
