= Northern Mariana Islands men's national basketball team =

Northern Mariana Islands
- FIBA ranking: NR (1 September 2026)
- Joined FIBA: 1981
- FIBA zone: FIBA Oceania
- National federation: Mariana Islands Basketball Federation

Oceanian Championship
- Appearances: None

Pacific Games
- Appearances: 1
- Medals: None

Oceania Basketball Tournament
- Appearances: ?
- Medals: None
| Home | Away |

The Northern Mariana Islands Men's National Basketball Team represents the Northern Mariana Islands in international basketball competitions.

== Current extended squad ==
- Coach Rufion Aguon
- Ed Diaz of Michelob-Master Construction Torque
- Edsel Mendoza (-F) of Bud Light-Toyota Tundra
- John Joyner (-F) of MARPAC-Nissan Titans
- Dan Barcinas of O'Douls-Ol'Aces
- Kelvin Fitial of MARPAC-Nissan Titans
- Jeremy Sablan of Bud Ice-SaipanCell Hoopaholics
- Melvin Manibusan
- Mark Wallace
- Steve Rasa of MARPAC-Nissan Titans
- Shan Seman of O'Douls-Ol'Aces
- Jack Lizama (-F) of O'Douls-Ol'Aces
- Aleric Aguon of MARPAC-Nissan Titans
- Justin Fejeran
- Gus Palacios
- James Lee
- Dexter Mendiola

== Competitive record ==
=== FIBA Oceania Championship ===
Never participated

=== Pacific Games ===
- 1983-2007: ?
- 2011-2015: Did not participate
- 2019: To be determined

=== Oceania Basketball Tournament ===
- 1985-2013: ?

=== Melanesia Basketball Cup ===
Never participated

== See also ==
- Northern Mariana Islands women's national basketball team
