= Basketball at the Pacific Games =

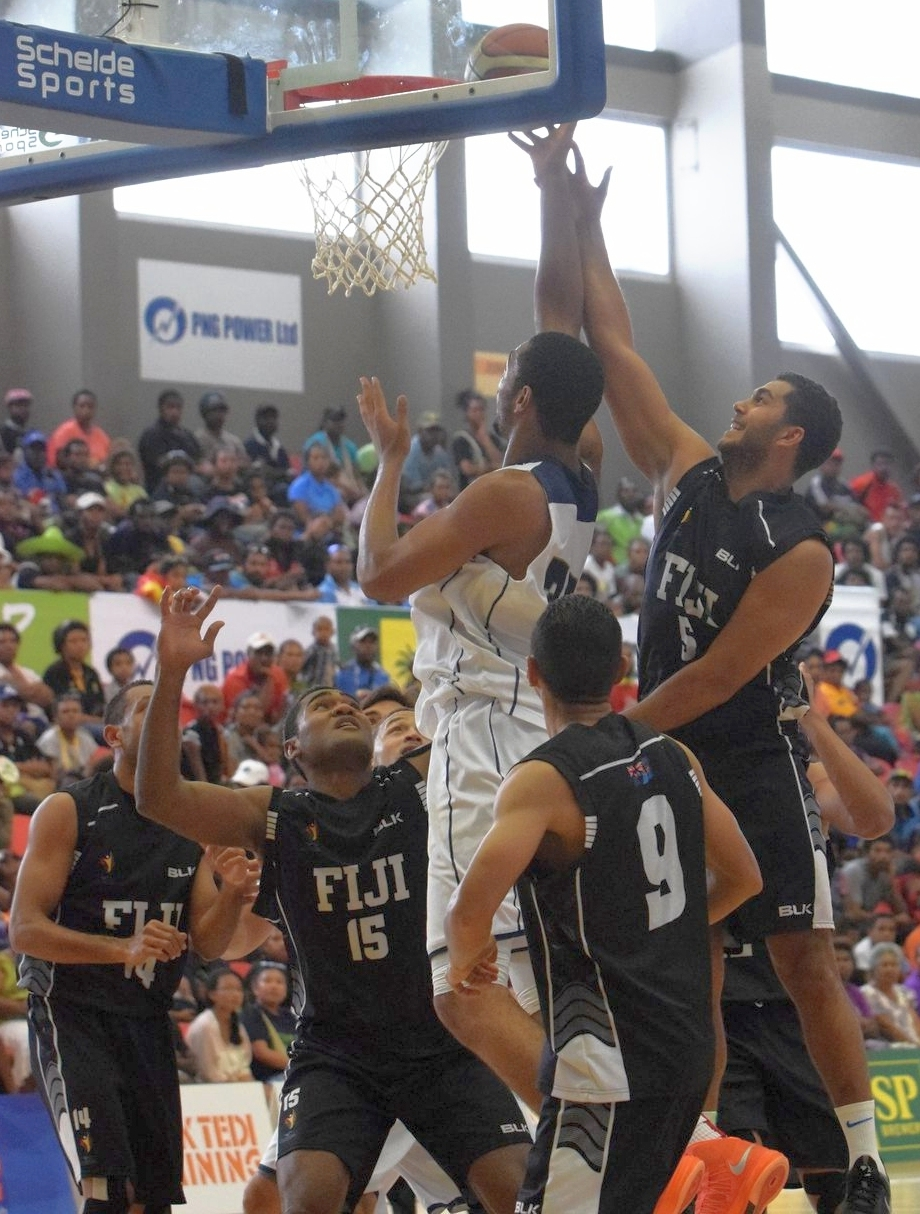
Guam plays Fiji in the Men's gold medal match at the 2015 Pacific Games.

Basketball at the Pacific Games (previously known as the South Pacific Games) has been played since 1963. It has also been contested at the Pacific Mini Games and, from the games at Port Vila in 2017, under the 3x3 format.

== Men's tournament ==
=== 5x5 ===
Year	Hosts	Gold Medal Game			Bronze Medal Game			Refs
Year	Hosts	Gold	Score	Silver	Bronze	Score	Fourth Place	Refs
1963	(Fiji); Suva	Tahiti	No playoff	American Samoa	Papua New Guinea	61–54	Nauru	
1966	(New Caledonia); Nouméa	Tahiti	42–23	New Caledonia	Guam	63–47	Papua New Guinea	
1969	(Papua New Guinea); Port Moresby	Tahiti	56–39	Papua New Guinea	New Caledonia	72–64	Guam	
1971	(French Polynesia); Papeete	Tahiti	84–73	American Samoa	Papua New Guinea	70–60	Guam	
1975	(Guam); Tumon	Guam	97–73	American Samoa	New Caledonia	77–74	Tahiti	
1979	(Fiji); Suva	Guam	113–106	Tahiti	American Samoa	103–101	Papua New Guinea	
1983	(Samoa); Apia	American Samoa	86–77	Guam	Western Samoa	109–79	Fiji	
1987	(New Caledonia); Nouméa	American Samoa	91–63	Fiji	Guam	101–87	New Caledonia	
1991	(Papua New Guinea); Port Moresby	American Samoa	No playoff	Guam	Tahiti	No playoff	Fiji	
1995	(French Polynesia); Papeete	Tahiti	95–68	New Caledonia	Fiji	89–86	Guam	
1999	(Guam); Santa Rita	Western Samoa	66–63	Guam	New Caledonia	80–72	Fiji	
2003	(Fiji); Suva	New Caledonia	71–63	Guam	Western Samoa	76–73	Fiji	
2007	(Samoa); Apia	Fiji	95–58	Guam	Samoa	85–76	New Caledonia	
2011	(New Caledonia); Nouméa	New Caledonia	50–43	Guam	Tahiti	57–49	Fiji	
2015	(Papua New Guinea); Port Moresby	Guam	78–61	Fiji	Tahiti	83–73	Papua New Guinea	
2019	(Samoa); Apia	Guam	83–74	Tahiti	Fiji	72–49	Papua New Guinea	
2023	(Solomon Islands); Honiara	Fiji	51–47	Guam	New Caledonia	97–61	Samoa	

=== 3x3 ===
Year	Hosts	Gold Medal Game			Bronze Medal Game			Refs
Year	Hosts	Gold	Score	Silver	Bronze	Score	Fourth Place	Refs
2019	(Samoa); Apia	Guam	20–18	Fiji	Samoa	19–18	Marshall Islands	
2023	(Solomon Islands); Honiara	Guam	19–18	Fiji	New Caledonia	21–5	Papua New Guinea	

== Women's tournament ==
=== 5x5 ===
Year	Hosts	Gold Medal Game			Bronze Medal Game			Refs
Year	Hosts	Gold	Score	Silver	Bronze	Score	Fourth Place	Refs
1966	(New Caledonia); Nouméa	Tahiti	35–31	Papua New Guinea	Fiji	42–30	New Caledonia	
1969	(Papua New Guinea); Port Moresby	Papua New Guinea	35–33	Tahiti	Fiji	50–28	New Caledonia	
1971	(French Polynesia); Papeete	Papua New Guinea	58–41	Tahiti	New Caledonia	No playoff	Fiji	
1975	(Guam); Tumon	Tahiti	37–33	Papua New Guinea	New Caledonia	78–55	Guam	
1979	(Fiji); Suva	Papua New Guinea	75–68	Fiji	Tahiti	80–47	New Caledonia	
1983	(Samoa); Apia	Fiji	58–48	Papua New Guinea	American Samoa	94–70	Tahiti	
1987	(New Caledonia); Nouméa	Fiji	59–46	Tahiti	Papua New Guinea	95–37	Guam	
1991	(Papua New Guinea); Port Moresby	Papua New Guinea	Round- robin	Tahiti	Fiji	Round- robin	New Caledonia	
1995	(French Polynesia); Papeete	Tahiti	64–44	Fiji	New Caledonia	63–55	Guam	
1999	(Guam); Santa Rita	Tahiti	58–42	Fiji	Guam	70–55	American Samoa	
2003	(Fiji); Suva	Western Samoa	47–44	Fiji	New Caledonia	68–52	Tahiti	
2007	(Samoa); Apia	Fiji	70–62	American Samoa	Papua New Guinea	70–59	Tahiti	
2011	(New Caledonia); Nouméa	Tahiti	59–47	New Caledonia	Fiji	64–51	Samoa	
2015	(Papua New Guinea); Port Moresby	Fiji	75–61	American Samoa	Tahiti	62–51	Papua New Guinea	
2019	(Samoa); Apia	American Samoa	74–53	Fiji	Samoa	87–85	Guam	
2023	(Solomon Islands); Honiara	Tahiti	53–46	Cook Islands	Fiji	63–55	Samoa	

=== 3x3 ===
Year	Hosts	Gold Medal Game			Bronze Medal Game			Refs
Year	Hosts	Gold	Score	Silver	Bronze	Score	Fourth Place	Refs
2019	(Samoa); Apia	Fiji	20–9	Cook Islands	Tahiti	18–8	New Caledonia	
2023	(Solomon Islands); Honiara	TBD	–	TBD	TBD	–	TBD	

== Medal table ==
These are the all time medal standings in Pacific Games basketball for both men and women in all formats of the game since 1963. Men's basketball has been contested since the inaugural games in 1963, while the women's tournament made its debut in the second games in 1966. The 3x3 format was added for both men and women in 2019.

All-time medal table – Pacific Games Basketball
Rank	Nation	Gold	Silver	Bronze	Total
1	Tahiti (TAH)	11	6	6	23
2	Fiji (FIJ)	7	8	7	22
3	Guam (GUM)	5	7	3	15
4	American Samoa (ASA)	4	5	2	11
5	Papua New Guinea (PNG)	4	4	4	12
6	New Caledonia (NCL)	2	3	8	13
7	Samoa (SAM)	2	0	5	7
8	Cook Islands (COK)	0	2	0	2
Totals (8 entries)		35	35	35	105

== Pacific Mini Games ==
=== Men ===
Games	Year	Host city	Medals			Refs
Games	Year	Host city	Gold	Silver	Bronze	Refs
South Pacific Mini Games – Basketball						
V	1997	Pago Pago	American Samoa	Guam	Tahiti	
VII	2005	Koror	New Caledonia	Guam	Fiji	
Not contested at the Mini Games 2009-13
Pacific Mini Games – 3x3 Basketball						
X	2017	Port Vila	Samoa	Solomon Islands	Papua New Guinea	

=== Women ===
Games	Year	Host city	Medals			Refs
Games	Year	Host city	Gold	Silver	Bronze	Refs
South Pacific Mini Games – Basketball						
V	1997	Pago Pago	Tahiti	American Samoa	Fiji	
VII	2005	Koror	Fiji	Papua New Guinea	New Caledonia	
Not contested at the Mini Games 2009-13
Pacific Mini Games – 3x3 Basketball						
X	2017	Port Vila	Cook Islands	Papua New Guinea	Vanuatu	

=== Medals ===
Basketball was first played at the Pacific Mini Games in 1997. The 3x3 version was introduced for 2017.

All-time medal table – Pacific Mini Games Basketball
Rank	Nation	Gold	Silver	Bronze	Total
1	American Samoa (ASA)	1	1	0	2
2	Fiji (FIJ)	1	0	2	3
3	New Caledonia (NCL)	1	0	1	2
3	Tahiti (TAH)	1	0	1	2
5	Cook Islands (COK)	1	0	0	1
5	Samoa (SAM)	1	0	0	1
7	Papua New Guinea (PNG)	0	2	1	3
8	Guam (GUM)	0	2	0	2
9	Solomon Islands (SOL)	0	1	0	1
10	Vanuatu (VAN)	0	0	1	1
Totals (10 entries)		6	6	6	18

== See also ==
- FIBA Oceania Championship

== Sources ==
- "Results Booklet" (PDF 0.9 MB). FIBA Oceania. 30 September 2011. Archived from the original on 11 October 2014.
- Krastev, Todor (2014). "Basketball National Teams Oceania Archive". Todor66. Archived from the original on 21 October 2014.
