= 1991 South Pacific Games =

9th edition of the South Pacific Games

- Official logo of the Games
- Host city: Port Moresby and Lae
- Country: Papua New Guinea
- Nations: 16
- Athletes: 2,000+ ^{a}
- Events: 164 in 17 sports
- Opening: September 7, 1991
- Closing: September 21, 1991
- Opened by: Prince Andrew, Duke of York
- Main venue: Sir John Guise Stadium

The 1991 South Pacific Games (Tok Pisin: 1991 Saut Pasifik Gems), officially the IX South Pacific Games, and also known as Papua New Guinea 1991 or Moresby-Lae 1991, were the ninth edition of the South Pacific Games held from 7 to 21 September 1991 in Port Moresby and Lae.

For the first time, the South Pacific Games were co-hosted by two cities; the PNG capital of Port Moresby (which was hosting the Games for the second time after 1969), and Lae, the capital of Morobe Province. Events were held in and around the two cities with the opening and closing ceremonies of the Games held at the Sir John Guise Stadium in Port Moresby.

The host nation, Papua New Guinea, topped the medal table, winning the most gold medals (44) and the highest number of medals overall (100); this was PNG's first time to top the medal tally at a South Pacific Games. French Polynesia finished second with 30 golds and 80 overall medals.New Caledonia finished third.

== Development and preparations ==
While the arrangement of hosting the Games in two separate cities presented organisational challenges, it resulted in significant upgrades to sporting infrastructure in both locations. Port Moresby hosted athletics, basketball, cricket, lawn tennis, netball, rugby union, softball, squash, swimming, and sailing (including boardsailing and Hobie Cat), while Lae staged boxing, golf, lawn bowls, football, table tennis, volleyball, and weightlifting.

A dedicated Games Village was constructed to accommodate the athletes, with catering facilities providing approximately 25,000 meals per day for competitors and officials.

Construction and preparation were supported by contributions from both domestic and international sources. China provided an interest-free loan of PGK9 million for the main venue in Port Moresby (the Sir John Guise Sports Complex). Japan funded the Sir Ignatius Kilage Sports Complex in Lae at a cost of PGK16 million and supplied PGK300,000 worth of equipment. South Korea donated PGK30,000 in sports equipment, France contributed PGK55,500 for sailboards, and the United Kingdom provided personnel assistance. The Government of Papua New Guinea was the largest contributor, allocating PGK3.69 million in direct funding, exempting the Games from taxation and duty, and providing more than PGK3 million in additional support through government departments and ministries, including Education, Foreign Affairs, Police, Defence, Health, and Works.

Sponsorships and fundraising supplemented these contributions, bringing the total budget to PGK46 million. The Games were credited with stimulating the development of sporting facilities and technical expertise across the Pacific region.

=== Venues ===
The 1991 South Pacific Games were held across multiple venues in Port Moresby and Lae. Each city featured a newly constructed main sporting complex built specifically for the Games: the Sir John Guise Sports Complex in Port Moresby and the Sir Ignatius Kilage Sports Complex in Lae. In addition to these, nine existing venues and two temporary venues were utilised. The temporary venues were at the Papua New Guinea University of Technology and, although normally reserved for student use, were adapted for the Games—Duncanson Hall (a lecture theatre) hosted the weightlifting competition, while the university's oval was used for soccer.

==== Port Moresby ====
- Sir John Guise Sports Complex (new)
  - Sir John Guise Stadium – athletics, opening and closing ceremonies
  - Sir John Guise Indoor Stadium – basketball, squash
- Bisini Sports Grounds (existing)
  - Amini Park – cricket
  - Bisini Softball Diamonds – softball
  - Lloyd Robson Oval – rugby union
  - Rita Flynn Netball Courts – netball
- Port Moresby Tennis Club (existing) – tennis
- Royal Papua Yacht Club (existing) – sailing
- Sir Donald Cleland Pool (existing) – swimming

==== Lae ====
- Sir Ignatius Kilage Sports Complex (new)
  - Sir Ignatius Kilage Stadium – football
  - Sir Ignatius Kilage Indoor Stadium – boxing, table tennis, volleyball (finals)
  - SIKS volleyball court – volleyball (preliminaries)
- Lae Bowls Club (existing) – lawn bowls
- Lae Golf Club (existing) – golf
- PNG University of Technology
  - Duncanson Hall (temporary) – weightlifting
  - Unitech Oval (temporary) – football (classification matches)

== Participating countries ==
Sixteen Pacific nations participated in the Games:

- American Samoa
- Cook Islands
- Fiji
- French Polynesia
- Guam
- Nauru
- New Caledonia
- Niue
- Norfolk Island
- Northern Marianas
- Papua New Guinea
- Solomon Islands
- Tonga
- Vanuatu
- Wallis and Futuna
- Western Samoa

== Sports ==
17 sports were contested at the 1991 South Pacific Games:

- Athletics (41)
- Basketball (2) ^{b}
- Boxing (12)
- Cricket (1)
- Football (1)
- Golf (4)
- Lawn bowls (10)
- Netball (1)
- Rugby union (1)
- Sailing (8)
- Softball (2)
- Squash (4) ^{c}
- Swimming (32) ^{d}
- Table tennis (7)
- Tennis (7)
- Volleyball (2)
- Weightlifting (30)
Note: A number in parentheses indicates how many medal events were contested in that sport (where known).

== Medal table ==
Medals were awarded in a total of 164 events:

Rank	Nation	Gold	Silver	Bronze	Total
1	Papua New Guinea (PNG)	44	29	27	100
2	French Polynesia (PYF)	30	24	26	80
3	New Caledonia (NCL)	29	29	27	85
4	Western Samoa (WSM)	19	13	6	38
5	Fiji (FIJ)	13	30	23	66
6	Guam (GUM)	10	11	16	37
7	American Samoa (ASA)	9	6	8	23
8	Tonga (TON)	3	2	10	15
9	Vanuatu (VAN)	3	2	2	7
10	Nauru (NRU)	3	0	0	3
11	Cook Islands (COK)	1	4	5	10
12	Wallis and Futuna (WLF)	0	6	6	12
13	Solomon Islands (SOL)	0	5	12	17
14	Norfolk Island (NFI)	0	3	2	5
Totals (14 entries)		164	164	170	498

== See also ==
- 1969 South Pacific Games

== Notes ==
^a More than 2,000 athletes took part in the 1991 Games, which had more athletes and competitions than Auckland's 1990 Commonwealth Games.

^b Western Samoa initially took the men's basketball gold medal but the team was disqualified after a citizenship controversy, in which players were deemed ineligible.

^c Squash: There were individual and team events for men and women. PNG won all four gold medals. The South Pacific Games Council had announced in 1978 that squash would be included in the Games, and it was played in 1979, 1983, 1987, and 1991.

^d Swimming: French Polynesia's 14-year-old star Daine Lacombe won five gold medals in the pool.

== Sources ==
- 1991 South Pacific Games Results. Oceania Sport Information Centre (Report). Archived from the original on 31 October 2015.
