= Samoa men's national basketball team =

Samoa
- FIBA ranking: 131 ▼3 (1 September 2026)
- Joined FIBA: 1982
- FIBA zone: FIBA Oceania
- National federation: Samoa Basketball Federation
- Coach: Stephen Schuster

FIBA Asia Cup
- Appearances: None

Pacific Games
- Appearances: ?
- Medals: (gold) Gold: 1999 (silver) Silver: 2003, 2007 (bronze) Bronze: 1983

FIBA Polynesian Basketball Cup
- Appearances: 2
- Medals: (silver) Silver: 2018
Home	Away

Samoa national basketball team is the team that represents Samoa in international basketball and is a member of FIBA Oceania.

== Competitive record ==
=== FIBA Asia Cup ===
never participated

=== FIBA Oceania Championships ===
Year	Position		
1993	3	1993 FIBA Oceania Championship	New Zealand

=== Pacific Games ===
- 1983: (bronze)
- 1987-1995: ?
- 1999: (gold)
- 2003: (silver)
- 2007: (silver)
- 2011: 6th
- 2015: 5th
- 2019: 6th
- 2023: To be determined

=== Commonwealth Games ===
never participated

=== FIBA Polynesian Basketball Cup ===
- 2018: (silver)
- 2021: Qualified as host

== Current roster ==
At the 2019 Pacific Games:

Samoa men's national basketball team roster
Players
Coaches

Pos.	No.	Name	Age – Date of birth	Height	Club	Ctr.
C	4	Trevor Rea	33 – 10 November 1985	1.88 m (6 ft 2 in)
F	5	Inga Solofuti	27 – 26 December 1991	1.93 m (6 ft 4 in)
G	7	Dru-Leo Ape	17 – 14 October 2001	1.88 m (6 ft 2 in)	Franklin Bulls	(New Zealand)
F	8	Wayne Sio	20 – 19 July 1998	1.88 m (6 ft 2 in)
G	9	Bright Tapeneko	19 – 19 February 2000	1.83 m (6 ft 0 in)
F	10	Ryan Paia	21 – 2 September 1997	1.93 m (6 ft 4 in)
C	11	Theodore McFarland	23 – 16 October 1995	1.98 m (6 ft 6 in)	Savai’i Vikings	(Samoa)
G	12	Sinisini Atoa	35 – 26 March 1984	1.90 m (6 ft 3 in)
G	13	Ratu Levy	26 – 24 July 1992	1.96 m (6 ft 5 in)
G	14	Devante Keil	21 – 20 December 1997	1.93 m (6 ft 4 in)
F	15	Brett Mulitalo	19 – 21 January 2000	1.85 m (6 ft 1 in)
G	16	Terrell Hunt	21 – 25 January 1998	1.83 m (6 ft 0 in)

Head coach

- (Samoa) Stephen Schuster

Assistant coaches

Legend

- Club – describes last
  club before the tournament
- Age – describes age
  on 6 July 2019

=== Depth chart ===
Pos.	Starting 5	Bench 1	Bench 2
C	Theodore McFarland	Ryan Paia	Trevor Rea
PF	Inga Solofuti	Wayne Sio
SF	Dru-Leo Ape	Brett Mulitalo
SG	Devante Keil	Ratu Levy	Bright Tapeneko
PG	Sinisini Atoa	Terrell Hunt

== Kit ==
=== Manufacturer ===
2018: EveniSport 2018-19: Zkeaps

== See also ==
- Samoa women's national basketball team
- Samoa national under-19 basketball team
- Samoa national under-17 basketball team
- Samoa national 3x3 team
