= American Samoa men's national basketball team =

American Samoa
- FIBA ranking: 142 (3 March 2026)
- Joined FIBA: 1976
- FIBA zone: FIBA Oceania
- National federation: American Samoa Basketball Association

FIBA Oceania Championship
- Appearances: 1
- Medals: Bronze: 1995

Pacific Games
- Medals: Gold: 1983, 1987, 1991; Silver: 1963, 1971, 1975; Bronze: 1979

Pacific Mini Games
- Medals: Gold: 1997; Silver: 1985; Bronze: 1981
Home	Away

The American Samoa men's national basketball team is the basketball side that represents American Samoa in international competitions.

== Competitive record ==
=== FIBA Oceania Championship ===
Year	Position	Tournament	Host
1995	3rd place, bronze medalist(s)	FIBA Oceania Championship 1995	Sydney, Australia

=== Oceania Basketball Tournament (Pacific Mini Games) ===
- 1981: 4th
- 1985: (silver)
- 1989-1993: ?
- 1997: (gold)
- 2001-2013: ?

=== Pacific Games ===
- 1963: (silver)
- 1966: ?
- 1969: 6th
- 1971: (silver)
- 1975: (silver)
- 1979: (bronze)
- 1983: (gold)
- 1987: (gold)
- 1991: (gold)
- 1995-2007: ?
- 2011: 5th
- 2015: 6th
- 2019: To be determined

== Roster ==
At the 2015 Pacific Games:

American Samoa men's national basketball team roster
Players
Coaches

Pos.	No.	Name	Age – Date of birth	Height	Club
	0	Talanoa Arthur Smith	–
	2	Paul Luamata McCoy	–
	3	Shane Letuu Dennis Ah Ping	–
	5	Pele P J Tui Jr	–
	7	Taele Jacob Leota	–
	10	Veresa Luvu Jr	–
	11	Fitimauea Kerisiano Talaeai	–
	22	William James McCoy	–
	32	Earvin Magic Leiato	–
	44	Frankie Sefulu Eteuati	–

Head coach

Legend

- Club – describes last
  club before the tournament
- Age – describes age
  on 20 August 2015

== See also ==
- American Samoa national under-19 basketball team
- American Samoa women's national basketball team
