= 1971 South Pacific Games =

4th edition of the South Pacific Games

- Host city: Papeete
- Country: Tahiti
- Nations: 14
- Athletes: ~2,000
- Events: 17 sports
- Opening: August 25, 1971
- Closing: September 5, 1971
- Opened by: Pierre Messmer

The 4th South Pacific Games (French: 4e Jeux du Pacifique sud; Tahitian: A 4 o te Ha‘utira‘a no Pātifita), also known as Papeete 1971 (Tahitian: Papeʻete 1971), held in Papeete, Tahiti from 25 August to 5 September 1971, was the fourth edition of the South Pacific Games.

Approximately 1,500 male athletes and 500 female athletes participated in the games.

== Participating countries ==
Fourteen Pacific nations or territories competed at the Games:

- American Samoa
- Cook Islands (70)
- Fiji
- French Polynesia
- Gilbert and Ellice Islands
- Guam
- Nauru
- New Caledonia (200+)
- New Hebrides
- (Papua New Guinea) Papua and New Guinea (132)
- Solomon Islands
- Tonga
- Wallis and Futuna
- Western Samoa
Note: A number in parentheses indicates the size of a country's team (where known).

== Sports ==
There were 17 sports contested at the 1971 South Pacific Games:

- Archery (2)
- Athletics (35)
- Basketball (2)
- Boxing (11)
- Cycling (6) ^{a}
- Football (1)
- Golf (2)
- Judo (6)
- Rugby union (1)
- Sailing (1) ^{b}
- Softball (1) ^{c}
- Swimming (1)
- Table tennis (7)
- Tennis (7)
- Underwater fishing (2)
- Volleyball (2)
- Weightlifting (8)
Note: A number in parentheses indicates how many medal events were contested in that sport (where known).

== Final medal table ==
Medals were awarded in 117 events:

Rank	Nation	Gold	Silver	Bronze	Total
1	New Caledonia (NCL)	33	32	27	92
2	Papua New Guinea (PNG)	28	28	21	77
3	French Polynesia (PYF)	22	24	24	70
4	Fiji (FIJ)	16	17	13	46
5	Western Samoa (WSM)	9	3	5	17
6	Tonga (TON)	4	3	4	11
7	Guam (GUM)	2	3	8	13
8	Wallis and Futuna (WLF)	2	1	6	9
9	Solomon Islands (SOL)	1	2	2	5
10	American Samoa (ASA)	0	2	12	14
11	Cook Islands (COK)	0	1	3	4
12	New Hebrides	0	1	0	1
–	Gilbert and Ellice Islands	0	0	0	0
–	Nauru (NRU)	0	0	0	0
Totals (12 entries)		117	117	125	359

== Notes ==
^a Cycling: Six events were held: 1 km time trial, individual road race (111 km), 74 km road race, 4 km individual pursuit, 4 km Olympic pursuit, and an individual sprint.

^b The sailing event was for the Fireball dinghy class.

^c The women's softball tournament was won by Guam, with Papua New Guinea and American Samoa taking second and third place respectively, although the Oceania Sport Information Centre report (on their Sporting Pulse webpage as at October 2015) omits the result.

== Sources ==
- 1971 South Pacific Games Results. Oceania Sport Information Centre (Report). Archived from the original on 28 October 2015.
