= 1969 South Pacific Games =

3rd edition of the South Pacific Games

- Host city: Port Moresby
- Country: Papua New Guinea
- Nations: 12
- Athletes: 1,150
- Events: 95 in 15 sports
- Opening: August 13, 1969
- Closing: August 23, 1969
- Opened by: Prince Edward, Duke of Kent
- Main venue: Sir Hubert Murray Stadium

The 3rd South Pacific Games, also known as Port Moresby 1969 (Tok Pisin: Pot Mosbi 1969), held on 13–23 August 1969 in Port Moresby, Papua New Guinea, was the third edition of the South Pacific Games. A total of 1,150 athletes participated in the games.

== Participating countries ==
Twelve Pacific nations or territories competed at the Games:

- American Samoa
- Fiji
- French Polynesia
- Guam
- Nauru
- New Caledonia
- New Hebrides
- (Papua New Guinea) Papua and New Guinea (234)
- Solomon Islands
- Tonga
- Wallis and Futuna
- Western Samoa
Note: A number in parentheses indicates the size of a country's team (where known).

== Sports ==
There were fifteen sports contested at the 1969 South Pacific Games:^{a}

- Athletics (33)
- Basketball (2)
- Boxing (10) ^{b}
- Football (1) ^{b}
- Golf (4) ^{b}^{,}^{c}
- Judo (5) ^{d}
- Netball (1) ^{e}
- Rugby union (1)
- Sailing (1) ^{f}
- Softball (1) ^{f}
- Swimming (19) ^{b}
- Table tennis (2) ^{b}
- Tennis (3) ^{b}
- Volleyball (2) ^{f}
- Weightlifting (9) ^{g}
Note: Numbers in parentheses indicate the number of medal events contested in each sport (where known).

== Medal table ==
* Host nation ( Papua and New Guinea)

1969 South Pacific Games medal table
Rank	Nation	Gold	Silver	Bronze	Total
1	New Caledonia (NCL)	36	20	21	77
2	(Australia) (Papua New Guinea) Papua and New Guinea*	23	23	18	64
3	Fiji (FIJ)	13	18	25	56
4	French Polynesia (PYF)	8	11	13	32
5	Tonga (TON)	6	4	2	12
6	Western Samoa (WSM)	4	4	1	9
7	Wallis and Futuna (WLF)	1	5	1	7
8	New Hebrides (New Hebrides)	1	4	2	7
9	Guam (GUM)	1	3	2	6
10	Nauru (NRU)	1	2	4	7
11	American Samoa (ASA)	1	0	5	6
12	British Solomon Islands	0	2	1	3
Totals (12 entries)		95	96	95	286

== Notes ==
^a A total of fifteen sports were contested at the 1969 South Pacific Games. Athletics (and the opening and closing ceremonies) were held at the newly built Sir Hubert Murray Stadium at Konedobu. The souvenir programme for 1969 features the official games logo and icons for the fifteen sports.

^b Basketball, tennis, table tennis, boxing, swimming, athletics, rugby union, soccer and golf were played at the 1969 games.

^c Golf: There were individual and team sections for men and for women; four medal events in total. The tournament was played at Lae.

^d Judo was included in the SPG for the first time in 1969. Participants came from Fiji, French Polynesia, Guam, New Caledonia, New Hebrides, Tonga, and Papua New Guinea. One competitor per country was allowed in each of five weight divisions: lightweight, light middleweight, middleweight, light heavyweight, heavyweight.

^e Netball was played at the 1969 Games, but PNG was given a prize instead of the gold medal as only two teams entered the competition.

^f Yachting (Fireball dinghy), volleyball, and softball were played at the 1969 games.

^g Weightlifting, yachting and boxing are depicted on postage stamps celebrating the 1969 games.

== Sources ==
- "Complete results 3rd South Pacific Games". Pacific Islands Monthly. 40 (9). Pacific Publications: 36–37. 1 September 1969.
- 1969 South Pacific Games Results. Oceania Sport Information Centre (Report). Archived from the original on 28 October 2015.
