= 2008 FIBA World Olympic Qualifying Tournament for Women squads =

Below is a list of squads at the FIBA World Olympic Qualifying Tournament for Women 2008:

== Angola ==
- Maria Afonso
- Jaquelina Francisco
- Domitila Ventura
- Ângela Cardoso
- Isabel Francisco
- Barbara Guimaraes
- Irene Guerreiro
- Sonia Guadalupe
- Astrida Vicente
- Judith Queta
- Nadir Manuel
- Nassecela Mauricio
- coach: Raul Duarte

== Argentina ==
- Mariana Cava
- Verónica Soberón
- Sthefany Thomas
- Melisa Daniela Cejas
- Sandra Pavón
- María Gimena Landra
- Paula Gatti
- Marcella Pauletta
- María Alejandra Fernández
- Constanza Landra
- Carolina Sánchez
- Florencia Fernández
- coach: Eduardo Pinto

== Belarus ==
- Olga Padabed
- Olga Masilionene
- Katsiaryna Snytsina
- Tatsiana Likhtarovich
- Sviatlana Volnaya
- Natallia Anufryienka
- Anastasiya Verameyenka
- Yelena Leuchanka
- Natallia Marchanka
- Tatyana Troina
- Nataliya Trafimava
- Marina Kress
- coach: Anatoly Buyalski

== Brazil ==
- [[]]
- [[]]
- [[]]
- [[]]
- Iziane Castro Marques
- [[]]
- [[]]
- [[]]
- [[]]
- Franciele Nascimento
- [[]]
- Kelly Santos
- coach: Paulo Roberto Bassul

== Chinese Taipei ==
- Huang Fan-shan
- Chien Wei-chuan
- Chiang Feng-chun
- Wen Chi
- Lin Chi-wen
- Chu Yung-hsu
- Tsai Pei-chen
- Cheng Hui-yun
- Lin Hui-mei
- Ma Yi-hung
- Li Wan-ting
- Liu Chia-hsiu
- coach: Hong Ling-yao

== Cuba ==
- Arleys Romero
- Ineidis Casanova
- Yakelyn Plutin
- Oyanaias Gelis
- Yulizeny Soria
- Yamara Amargo
- Yayma Boulet
- Marlen Cepeda
- Clenia Noblet
- Taimy Fernandez
- Leidys Oquendo
- Suchitel Avila
- coach: Alberto Zabala

== Czech Republic ==
- Jana Vesela
- Ivana Vecerova
- Romana Hejdova
- Michala Hartigova
- Micaela Uhrova
- Hana Machová
- Edita Sujanova
- Romana Stehlikova
- Markéta Mokrosova
- Petra Kulichova
- Katerina Elhotova
- Eva Viteckova
- coach: Jan Bobrovsky

== Fiji ==
- Letava Whippy
- Mikaelar Whippy
- Boulou Tuisou
- Valerie Nainima
- Brittany Hazelman
- Ofa Moce
- Seini Dobui
- Mareta Mani
- Alisi Tabulaevu
- Lusiani Robanakadavu
- Kelera Maitaika
- Vitorina Matila
- coach: Mike Whippy

== Japan ==
- Yuko Aizawa
- Noriko Koiso
- Naomi Yoshiro
- Sachiko Ishikawa
- AI Mittani
- Mayumi Funabiki
- Ryoko Yano
- Jumiko Yamada
- Asami Yoshido
- Yuko Oga
- Riko Tanaka
- Ryoko Utsumi
- coach: Tomohide Utsumi

== Latvia ==
- Elīna Babkina
- Anda Eibele
- Zane Eglīte
- Zane Teilāne-Tamane
- Gunta Baško
- Liene Jansone
- Anete Jēkabsone-Žogota
- Aija Putniņa
- Dita Krumberga
- Ieva Tāre
- Ieva Kubliņa
- Aija Brumermane
- coach: Ainārs Zvirgzdiņš

== Senegal ==
- Fatou Dieng
- Aya Traore
- Awa Gueye
- Ndèye Sène
- Mame Diodio Diouf
- Salimata Diatta
- Tening Sabelle Diata
- Sokhna Lycka Sy
- Awa Doumbia
- Khady Diakhate
- Jeanne Senghor
- Bineta Diouf
- coach: Moustapha Gaye

== Spain ==
- Laura Nicholls
- Cindy Lima
- Tamara Abalde
- Isabel Sánchez
- Lucila Pascua
- Laia Palau
- Elisa Aguilar
- Silvia Domínguez
- Anna Montañana
- Amaya Valdemoro
- María Revuelto
- Alba Torrens
- Coach: Evaristo Pérez
