= 2026 FIBA Women's Polynesian Cup =

3rd FIBA Women's Polynesian Cup

Tournament details
- Host country: Tahiti
- City: Toahotu
- Dates: 20−24 October 2026
- Teams: 4 (from 1 sub-confederation)
- Venue: 1 (in 1 host city)

Final positions
- Champions: American Samoa (1st title)
- Runners-up: Samoa
- Third place: Cook Islands

Tournament statistics
- Games played: 8

Official website
- www.fiba.basketball

The 2026 FIBA Women's Polynesian Cup was the third edition of the FIBA Polynesian Cup, an international women's basketball tournament contested by national teams of the Polynesian sub-zone of FIBA Oceania. The tournament, along with the men's event, was played in Toahotu, Tahiti, French Polynesia, from 20 to 24 October 2026.

American Samoa secured their first ever title with a victory over Samoa in the final, 79–65.

== Participating teams ==
- American Samoa
- Cook Islands
- Samoa
- Tahiti (Hosts)

All times are local (Pacific/Tahiti Time Zone; UTC−10:00).

== Group phase ==
| Pos | Team | Pld | W | L | PF | PA | PD | Pts | Qualification |
|---|---|---|---|---|---|---|---|---|---|
| 1 | American Samoa | 3 | 3 | 0 | 227 | 160 | +67 | 6 | Final |
| 2 | Samoa | 3 | 2 | 1 | 203 | 208 | −5 | 5 | Final |
| 3 | Cook Islands | 3 | 1 | 2 | 190 | 203 | −13 | 4 | 3rd place game |
| 4 | Tahiti (H) | 3 | 0 | 3 | 173 | 222 | −49 | 3 | 3rd place game |

Source: FIBA
Rules for classification: 1) Points; 2) Head-to-head results; 3) Points difference; 4) Points scored.
(H) Hosts

20 October 2026
11:00

Boxscore

| Samoa | 81–64 | Cook Islands |
Scoring by quarter: 19–12, 26–11, 21–18, 15–23

Salle Omnisports de Toahotu

20 October 2026
19:30

Boxscore

| American Samoa | 72–62 | Tahiti |
Scoring by quarter: 25–18, 15–12, 20–8, 12–24

Salle Omnisports de Toahotu

21 October 2026
14:00

Boxscore

| Cook Islands | 58–66 | American Samoa |
Scoring by quarter: 12–24, 9–12, 14–22, 23–8

Salle Omnisports de Toahotu

21 October 2026
17:00

Boxscore

| Tahiti | 55–82 | Samoa |
Scoring by quarter: 9–29, 21–19, 12–20, 13–14

Salle Omnisports de Toahotu

23 October 2026
11:00

Boxscore

| American Samoa | 89–40 | Samoa |
Scoring by quarter: 26–16, 27–11, 17–6, 19–7

Salle Omnisports de Toahotu

23 October 2026
19:30

Boxscore

| Tahiti | 56–68 | Cook Islands |
Scoring by quarter: 15–17, 14–14, 16–17, 11–20

Salle Omnisports de Toahotu

== Playoffs ==
=== 3rd place game ===
24 October 2026
14:00

Boxscore

| Cook Islands | 57–48 | Tahiti |
Scoring by quarter: 10–6, 9–15, 14–15, 24–12

Salle Omnisports de Toahotu

=== Final ===
24 October 2026
17:00

Boxscore

| American Samoa | 79–65 | Samoa |
Scoring by quarter: 16–18, 22–19, 21–15, 20–13

Salle Omnisports de Toahotu

== Final standings ==
| Rank | Team | Record |
|---|---|---|
| 1st place, gold medalist(s) | American Samoa | 4–0 |
| 2nd place, silver medalist(s) | Samoa | 2–2 |
| 3rd place, bronze medalist(s) | Cook Islands | 2–2 |
| 4 | Tahiti | 0–4 |
