= 2026 FIBA Polynesian Cup =

3rd FIBA Polynesian Cup

Tournament details
- Host country: Tahiti
- City: Toahotu
- Dates: 19−24 October 2026
- Teams: 5 (from 1 sub-confederation)
- Venue: 1 (in 1 host city)

Final positions
- Champions: Tonga (1st title)
- Runners-up: Tahiti
- Third place: Samoa

Tournament statistics
- Games played: 12

Official website
- www.fiba.basketball

The 2026 FIBA Polynesian Cup was the third edition of the FIBA Polynesian Cup, an international men's basketball tournament contested by national teams of the Polynesian sub-zone of FIBA Oceania. The tournament, along with the women's event, was played in Toahotu, Tahiti, French Polynesia, from 19 to 24 October 2026.

Tonga secured their first ever title with a victory over Tahiti in the final, 74–69. Both finalists earned the right to represent Polynesia in the men's basketball tournament of the 2027 Pacific Games.

== Participating teams ==
- American Samoa
- Cook Islands
- Samoa
- Tahiti (Hosts)
- Tonga

All times are local (Pacific/Tahiti Time Zone; UTC−10:00).

== Group phase ==
Pos	Team	Pld	W	L	PF	PA	PD	Pts	Qualification
1	Tahiti (H)	4	4	0	387	294	+93	8	Final
2	Tonga	4	3	1	331	293	+38	7	Final
3	Samoa	4	2	2	297	293	+4	6	3rd place game
4	Cook Islands	4	1	3	300	329	−29	5	3rd place game
5	American Samoa	4	0	4	244	350	−106	4	

Source: FIBA
Rules for classification: 1) Points; 2) Head-to-head results; 3) Points difference; 4) Points scored.
(H) Hosts

19 October 2026
17:00

Boxscore

Tonga	71–67	Samoa
Scoring by quarter: 16–13, 20–23, 14–17, 21–14

Salle Omnisports de Toahotu

19 October 2026
19:30

Boxscore

Tahiti	94–47	American Samoa
Scoring by quarter: 20–9, 25–10, 20–15, 29–13

Salle Omnisports de Toahotu

20 October 2026
14:00

Boxscore

Cook Islands	64–87	Tonga
Scoring by quarter: 13–26, 16–22, 17–23, 18–16

Salle Omnisports de Toahotu

20 October 2026
17:00

Boxscore

Samoa	86–92	Tahiti
Scoring by quarter: 31–19, 19–29, 21–25, 15–19

Salle Omnisports de Toahotu

21 October 2026
11:00

Boxscore

American Samoa	64–74	Samoa
Scoring by quarter: 24–19, 19–24, 9–21, 12–10

Salle Omnisports de Toahotu

21 October 2026
19:30

Boxscore

Tahiti	103–74	Cook Islands
Scoring by quarter: 22–22, 33–24, 24–11, 24–17

Salle Omnisports de Toahotu

22 October 2026
17:00

Boxscore

Cook Islands	96–69	American Samoa
Scoring by quarter: 28–12, 26–19, 25–20, 17–18

Salle Omnisports de Toahotu

22 October 2026
19:30

Boxscore

Tonga	87–98	Tahiti
Scoring by quarter: 13–18, 29–25, 22–26, 23–29

Salle Omnisports de Toahotu

23 October 2026
14:00

Boxscore

Samoa	70–66	Cook Islands
Scoring by quarter: 15–19, 19–11, 17–18, 19–18

Salle Omnisports de Toahotu

23 October 2026
17:00

Boxscore

American Samoa	64–86	Tonga
Scoring by quarter: 16–28, 18–17, 12–11, 18–30

Salle Omnisports de Toahotu

== Playoffs ==
=== 3rd place game ===
24 October 2026
11:00

Boxscore

Samoa	101–94	Cook Islands
Scoring by quarter: 33–20, 19–30, 25–27, 24–17

Salle Omnisports de Toahotu

=== Final ===
24 October 2026
19:30

Boxscore

Tahiti	69–74	Tonga
Scoring by quarter: 16–25, 22–12, 16–23, 15–14

Salle Omnisports de Toahotu

== Final standings ==
Legend
Qualified for the 2027 Pacific Games

Rank	Team	Record
1st place, gold medalist(s)	Tonga	4–1
2nd place, silver medalist(s)	Tahiti	4–1
3rd place, bronze medalist(s)	Samoa	3–2
4	Cook Islands	1–4
5	American Samoa	0–4
