= 2018 FIBA Women's Polynesia Basketball Cup =

2018 edition of the FIBA Women's Polynesian Basketball Cup

1st FIBA Women's Polynesian Cup

Tournament details
- Host country: Samoa
- City: Apia
- Dates: 19−24 November
- Teams: 4 (from 1 sub-confederation)
- Venue: 1 (in 1 host city)

Final positions
- Champions: Cook Islands (1st title)
- Runners-up: Tahiti
- Third place: Samoa

Tournament statistics
- Games played: 10
- MVP: (Cook Islands) Keziah-Brittany Lewis

Official website
- ww.fiba.basketball/history

The 2018 FIBA Women's Polynesia Basketball Cup was the inaugural edition of the FIBA Polynesian Cup, an international women's basketball tournament contested by national teams of the newly formed Polynesian sub-zone of FIBA Oceania. The tournament, along with the men's event, was played at the NUS Gymnasium in Apia, Samoa, from 19 to 24 November 2018.

The tournament also served as a qualifier for the women's basketball tournament of the 2019 Pacific Games in Samoa with three berths for Polynesia allocated for that event.

The Cook Islands romped its way to the gold medal with a perfect 4–0 record punctuated by a dominating 91–58 win over Tahiti in the final. Both finalists, along with the hosts Samoa, who prevailed over American Samoa in the bronze medal game, earned the right to represent Polynesia in the women's basketball tournament of the 2019 Pacific Games, which was also held in Samoa.

== Teams ==
- American Samoa
- Cook Islands
- Samoa (Hosts)
- Tahiti
- ~~Tonga~~ (withdrew) (Note: Tonga originally qualified for this tournament but withdrew prior to the start of the tournament, with as of this posting, no official statement yet has been released.)

== Preliminary round ==
Pos	Team	Pld	W	L	PF	PA	PD	Pts	Qualification
1	Cook Islands	3	3	0	225	109	+116	6	Semifinals
2	Tahiti	3	2	1	217	138	+79	5	Semifinals
3	Samoa (H)	3	1	2	189	191	−2	4	Semifinals
4	American Samoa	3	0	3	94	287	−193	3	Semifinals

Source: FIBA
Rules for classification: 1) Points; 2) Head-to-head results; 3) Points difference; 4) Points scored.
(H) Hosts

19 November 2018
15:00

Boxscore

Tahiti	106–32	American Samoa
Scoring by quarter: 26–12, 26–2, 29–6, 25–12
Pts: Lefranc 33; Rebs: Lefranc, Salem 6 Asts: Lefranc 6		Pts: Rac. Toleafoa 11; Rebs: E. Taufa'asau, Rae. Toleafoa 7 Asts: Rh. Toleafoa, Rae. Toleafoa, Masoli 1

NUS Gymnasium, Apia

19 November 2018
19:00

Boxscore

Samoa	47–80	Cook Islands
Scoring by quarter: 10–18, 4–24, 14–21, 19–17
Pts: Manumaleuga 16; Rebs: Ropati 8 Asts: Kelsall 2		Pts: K. Lewis 19; Rebs: A. Lewis, Pilitati 7 Asts: Kiriau 4

NUS Gymnasium, Apia

20 November 2018
13:00

Boxscore

Tahiti	35–53	Cook Islands
Scoring by quarter: 9–12, 6–17, 15–11, 5–13
Pts: Lefranc 12; Rebs: Lefranc 10; Asts: M. Tepu, Lextreyt 2		Pts: K. Lewis 15; Rebs: Sadler 12; Asts: Main 5

NUS Gymnasium, Apia

20 November 2018
17:00

Boxscore

American Samoa	35–89	Samoa
Scoring by quarter: 11–21, 11–19, 3–26, 10–23
Pts: Rac. Toleafoa 8 Rebs: Vaiomounga, Rae. Toleafoa 6 Asts: Masoli, Rae. Toleafoa 3		Pts: Manumaleuga 21; Rebs: Sau 13; Asts: Manumaleuga 6

NUS Gymnasium, Apia

21 November 2018
13:00

Boxscore

Cook Islands	92–27	American Samoa
Scoring by quarter: 24–7, 17–6, 22–12, 29–2
Pts: K. Lewis 19; Rebs: Katu 10; Asts: Kiriau 6		Pts: Rae. Toleafoa 7 Rebs: Vaiomounga 6 Asts: Masoli, Rh. Toleafoa 2

NUS Gymnasium, Apia

21 November 2018
15:00

Boxscore

Tahiti	76–53	Samoa
Scoring by quarter: 14–9, 16–14, 21–22, 25–8
Pts: Lefranc 19; Rebs: Lefranc 16; Asts: Lextreyt 6		Pts: Sau 15; Rebs: Sau 8 Asts: Muaulu 4

NUS Gymnasium, Apia

== Playoffs ==
=== Bracket ===
Semifinals
23 November
Cook Islands	92
American Samoa	44
23 November
Tahiti	91
Samoa	75

Final
24 November
Cook Islands	91
Tahiti	58
Third place game
24 November
American Samoa	53
Samoa	70

=== Semifinals ===
23 November 2018
13:00

Boxscore

Cook Islands	92–44	American Samoa
Scoring by quarter: 19–11, 29–1, 22–18, 22–14
Pts: K. Lewis 22; Rebs: Sadler, Katu 7 Asts: Sadler 5		Pts: Rac. Toleafoa 20; Rebs: Rac. Toleafoa 10; Asts: Masoli 3

NUS Gymnasium, Apia

23 November 2018
19:00

Boxscore

Tahiti	91–75	Samoa
Scoring by quarter: 16–26, 25–4, 23–18, 27–27
Pts: Lefranc 25; Rebs: Lefranc 19; Asts: A. Tepu 8		Pts: Manumaleuga 34; Rebs: Ropati 18; Asts: Le'Au'Anae 3

NUS Gymnasium, Apia

=== Third place game ===
24 November 2018
13:00

Boxscore

American Samoa	53–70	Samoa
Scoring by quarter: 13–16, 14–18, 14–19, 12–17

NUS Gymnasium, Apia

=== Final ===
24 November 2018
17:00

Boxscore

Cook Islands	91–58	Tahiti
Scoring by quarter: 22–17, 20–7, 25–19, 24–15

NUS Gymnasium, Apia

== Final standings ==
Legend
Qualified for the 2019 Pacific Games
Qualified for the 2019 Pacific Games as hosts

Rank	Team	Record
1st place, gold medalist(s)	Cook Islands	5–0
2nd place, silver medalist(s)	Tahiti	3–2
3rd place, bronze medalist(s)	Samoa	2–3
4	American Samoa	0–5

== Awards ==
2018 FIBA Women's Polynesian champions

Cook Islands
1st title

- Most Valuable Player: (Cook Islands) Keziah-Brittany Lewis
- All-Star Team:
  - PG – (French Polynesia) Aeata Tepu
  - SG – (Samoa) Cherish Manumaleuga
  - SF – (Cook Islands) Keziah-Brittany Lewis
  - PF – (French Polynesia) Oceane Lefranc
  - C – (Cook Islands) Terai Sadler

== See also ==
- 2017 FIBA Women's Melanesia Basketball Cup
- 2018 FIBA Polynesia Basketball Cup (men's tournament)
- Basketball at the 2018 Micronesian Games
- Basketball at the 2019 Pacific Games
