= Sports in American Samoa =

Sports in American Samoa are slightly different from sports in Samoa. The main difference is that Samoans in American Samoa are more likely to follow or play American sports such as American football, basketball, and baseball. Western Samoans are more likely to follow or play rugby union, rugby league, and netball. Sports such as mixed martial arts, boxing, professional wrestling, and volleyball are popular among most ethnic Samoans regardless of location.

== Types of sports ==
=== American football ===
American football is the most popular sport in American Samoa. Per capita, the Samoan Islands have produced the highest number of NFL players. It's estimated that a boy born to Samoan parents is 56 times more likely to get into the NFL than any other boy in the United States.

Samoans have been at the forefront as a wave of Polynesian players and coaches have found success in the sport. In 1945, Al Lolotai became the first Polynesian to play in the NFL. In 2014, Marcus Mariota became the first Polynesian player to win the Heisman Trophy. In 2015, Junior Seau became the first Polynesian player to be inducted into the Pro Football Hall of Fame. Troy Polamalu won the NFL Defensive Player of the Year Award in 2010 and is the first Polynesian player to be on the cover of a Madden NFL video game. Ken Niumatalolo is believed to be the first Polynesian head coach in college football history.

=== Baseball ===
Baseball is a growing sport in American Samoa, where the national team has won silver and bronze medals at the Pacific Games. In 1968, Tony Solaita became the first Major League Baseball player to come from American Samoa. On April 21, 2018, Sean Manaea became the first pitcher of Samoan descent to throw a no-hitter in MLB history. Other notable Samoan Americans who have played in the major leagues are Mike Fetters, Chris Aguila, Matt Tuiasosopo, Jacob Hannemann, and Benny Agbayani who is best known for his walk-off home run in Game 3 of the 2000 National League Division Series.

=== Basketball ===
Basketball is popular in American Samoa due to mainland United States influence. American Samoa's national teams are major contenders in the FIBA Oceania zone as they have won multiple medals at international events such as the Pacific Games. In 1980, Wally Rank became the first Samoan to play in the NBA. In 2000, Naomi Mulitauaopele became the first Samoan woman to play in the WNBA. Peyton Siva is known for leading the Louisville Cardinals to two Final Four appearances and a national championship in 2013. Other notable Samoans in basketball are James Johnson, Bubba Lau'ese, Wendell White, Rashaun Broadus and Mekeli Wesley.

In recent years, 3x3 basketball has gotten more popular as well. American Samoa's Men's division has 11 registered teams, the Women's features six teams and there is a U19 division.

American Samoa women's national basketball team won the title as Basketball Champion at the 2019 Pacific Games.

=== Boxing ===
The number of Samoans in the world of boxing has increased over the years. In 2004, Maselino Masoe became the first Samoan boxer to win a major world title by capturing the WBA world middleweight title. In 2011, Jai Opetaia became the first Samoan amateur boxer to win a world championship by taking the light heavyweight gold medal at the 2011 AIBA Youth World Boxing Championships in Nur-Sultan, Kazakhstan. Joseph Parker became the first Samoan boxer to win a WBO world heavyweight title in 2016. Retired professional boxer David Tua won a bronze medal at the 1992 Summer Olympics while representing New Zealand.

=== Mixed martial arts ===
Mixed martial arts is a growing sport among ethnic Samoans all over the world. Mixed martial artists of Samoan descent who have fought in the UFC are Mark Hunt, Max Holloway, Kendall Grove, Andre Fili, Robert Whittaker, Tyson Pedro, Falaniko Vitale and Kailin Curran. Both Whittaker and Grove are previous tournament winners of The Ultimate Fighter in the middleweight and welterweight divisions respectively. Max Holloway is the first fighter of Samoan descent to win a UFC world title. Outside of UFC, Mark Hunt has won the 2001 K-1 World Grand Prix. On September 24, 2016, Siala-Mou Siliga won the Road FC Openweight Tournament at Road FC 33. On February 25, 2018, Genah Fabian became the first woman of Samoan descent to win a WMC world title.

=== Professional wrestling ===
A number have of Samoans have ventured into professional wrestling. Members of the prominent Anoaʻi family such as Dwayne Johnson, Savelina Fanene, Leati Anoaʻi, Rodney Anoaʻi, Solofa Fatu, and Edward Fatu are known for their work in WWE. Other notable Samoan wrestlers include Sarona Snuka, Nuufolau Seanoa, Cheree Crowley, Danielle Kamela, Emily Dole, and Sonny Siaki.

=== Rugby union ===
Rugby union in American Samoa is a growing sport. The governing body is the American Samoa Rugby Union, which is a full member of both the Federation of Oceania Rugby Unions and the International Rugby Board. Rugby union has been played in American Samoa since at least 1924, but the national development of the game has been overshadowed by the popularity of American football since the 1970s. The American Samoa Rugby Union was established in 1990, and did not become fully affiliated to the International Rugby Board until 2012.

=== Rugby league ===
The national team has competed in the 1988, 1992, 1998 and 2004 Pacific Cup competitions. The team has also competed in the 2003 and 2004 Rugby League World Sevens qualifiers in the 2005 World Sevens competition. American Samoa's first match in international rugby league was in the 1988 Pacific Cup against Tonga. The Tongan national team won the match 38–14 which is still the biggest loss by an American Samoan team. American Samoa's biggest win was in 2004 against New Caledonia with the score ending at 62–6.

=== Association football ===
American Samoa's national team is ranked near the bottom of the FIFA rankings. It also has the distinction of suffering the worst loss in international football history. They lost to Australia 31–0 in a FIFA World Cup qualification match on April 11, 2001. They won their first international match 2–1 against Tonga on November 24, 2011.

=== Sumo wrestling ===
In the world of Sumo, Fiamalu Penitani became just the second non-Japanese-born wrestler to reach yokozuna, the highest rank in the sport. Saleva'a Fuauli Atisano'e was the first non-Japanese-born wrestler to reach ōzeki, the second-highest rank in the sport. Kilifi Sapa is known for being the third non-Japanese-born wrestler to reach the top division. However, his highest rank was maegashira, the lowest of five ranks in the makuuchi division.

=== Volleyball ===
Volleyball is a popular sport in American Samoa. The women's national team won the gold medal at the 2015 Pacific Games by defeating Tahiti and they are known as one of the top teams in Oceania. Many mainland Samoan Americans can also be seen in both volleyball and beach volleyball. Eric Fonoimoana won a gold medal at the 2000 Olympic Games representing the United States in beach volleyball.

== Other sports ==
Several Samoan Americans have won medals at the Summer Olympic Games. Greg Louganis won four gold medals and one silver for Diving in consecutive Games from 1976 to 1988 representing the United States. Louganis also took five gold medals at the FINA World Aquatics Championships. In 1984, Robin Leamy won a gold medal for swimming as a member of the United States men's 4×100-meter freestyle relay team. Tumua Anae and Sami Hill have won gold medals with the United States women's Water polo squad at the 2012 Summer Olympics and 2016 Summer Olympics respectively.

In professional bodybuilding, Samoan Sonny Schmidt became the first Pacific Islander to win a Mr. Olympia event when he was crowned the 1995 Masters Olympia winner for contestants over 40 years of age.

Lisa Misipeka won a bronze medal at the 1999 IAAF World Championships in Athletics for the Women's hammer throw. Her third-place finish gave American Samoa its first ever medal at a world athletics championship event.

== Stadiums in American Samoa ==
Stadium	Capacity	City
Veterans Memorial Stadium	5,000	Tafuna
Pago Park	2,000	Pago Pago
DYWA Gym	500	Tafuna
Tony Solaita Baseball Field	500	Tafuna

== See also ==
- Sport in Samoa
- Sport in Oceania
