= Sport in Samoa =

The main sports played in Samoa are rugby union and rugby league. Other popular sports are netball and soccer. Samoans in American Samoa are more likely to follow or play American sports such as American football, basketball, and baseball. Sports such as mixed martial arts, boxing, professional wrestling, and volleyball are popular among most ethnic Samoans regardless of location.

== Types of sports ==
=== Rugby union ===
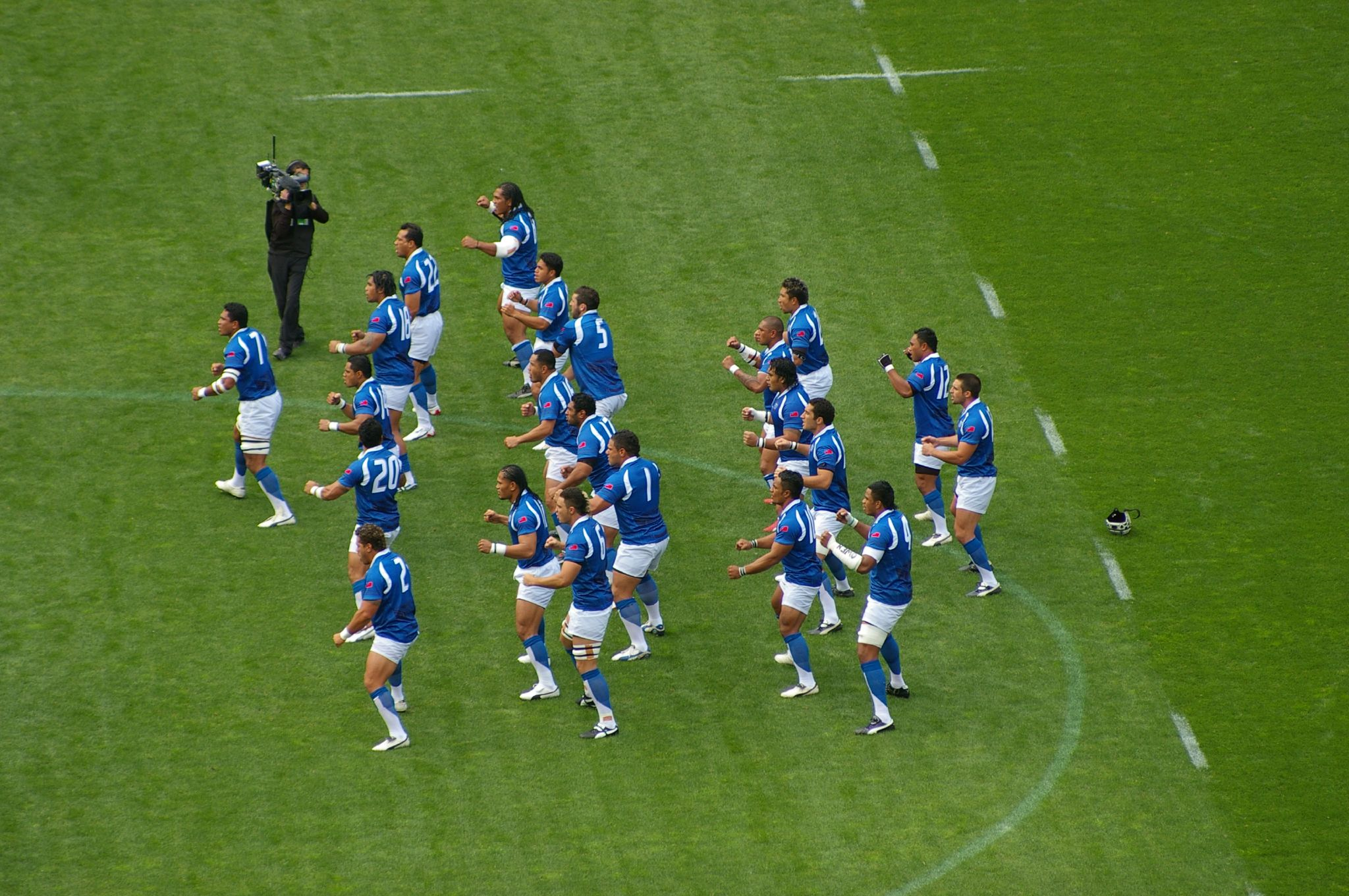
The Samoa national rugby union team.

Rugby union is the main sport in Samoa as it is played everywhere on the island. Samoa's national team has competed in every Rugby World Cup since 1991 and they consistently rank in the top 20 teams in world rugby. Some of the current national team record holders are Brian Lima for most caps and most tries, Tusi Pisi for most points, Semo Sititi for most matches as captain, and Gavin Williams for most points in a match. Elvis Seveali'i and Alesana Tuilagi are tied for most tries in a single match.

=== Rugby league ===
Rugby league is a popular sport in Samoa, with the national team reaching the quarter-finals of the Rugby League World Cup in 2000, 2013 and 2017, and the final in 2021. Samoa is known for producing NRL players at one of the highest rates in the world. Many Samoan New Zealanders and Samoan Australians also play in the Super League and RFL Championship in the northern hemisphere. Players of Samoan descent have been part of every Rugby League World Cup-winning side for either New Zealand Kiwis or Australian Kangaroos since 2008. Samoa-born Roger Tuivasa-Sheck is one of the most decorated individual players in the sport, having been named Rugby League World Golden Boot Award winner in 2019 for best international player. Tuivasa-Sheck also won the prestigious Dally M Medal as the best player in the National Rugby League in 2018. Sonny Bill Williams had previously won the Rugby League International Federation (RLIF) International Player of the year award in 2013.

=== American football ===
American football is a popular sport in Samoa but it still trails rugby union and rugby league in terms of participation. Per capita, the Samoan Islands have produced the highest number of NFL players. It's estimated that a boy born to Samoan parents is 56 times more likely to get into the NFL than any other boy in America. Samoans have been at the forefront as a wave of Polynesian players and coaches have found success in the sport. In 1945, Al Lolotai became the first Polynesian to play in the NFL. In 2014, Marcus Mariota became the first Polynesian player to win the Heisman Trophy. In 2015, Junior Seau became the first Polynesian player to be inducted into the Pro Football Hall of Fame. Troy Polamalu won the NFL Defensive Player of the Year Award in 2010 and is the first Polynesian player to be on the cover of a Madden NFL video game. Ken Niumatalolo is believed to be the first Polynesian head coach in college football history.

=== Association football ===
Association football (soccer) is a popular sport in Samoa, with the national team being ranked at one point 149th in the world. Former Everton and Australia playmaker, Tim Cahill, represented Samoa in youth national teams. In 2004, Cahill was named FIFA Oceania Footballer of the Year and was instrumental in helping the Australian Socceroos reach the 2006 FIFA World Cup knockout stage. At the 2015 AFC Asian Cup, Cahill was part of the winning Socceroos squad, defeating South Korea 2–1 in the final. Cahill finished his international career as Australia 's all-time leading goalscorer with 50 goals in 108 appearances. Cahill is the only Australian to feature at four FIFA World Cups, scoring goals at the 2006, 2010 and 2014 tournaments. Tim's brother Chris Cahill is playing as a captain for the Samoan national team. Sarai Bareman, who represented Samoa, was named Chief Women's Football Officer of FIFA in 2016.

=== Basketball ===
Samoa will host the 2021 FIBA Polynesian Basketball Cup. The country further hosted its last edition in 2018, when Samoa's national basketball team finished runner-up. Wally Rank and James Johnson are players of Samoan descent to have played in the NBA

=== Boxing ===
==== Professional boxing ====
Samoan fighters have been visible at all levels in the world of boxing. On 1 May 2004, Maselino Masoe became the first Samoan boxer to win a world title from one of the four recognised boxing organizations, by capturing the WBA 'regular' world middleweight title, stopping Kenyan Evans Ashira in the second round. On 10 December 2016, Joseph Parker became the first Samoan boxer to win a major world heavyweight title, defeating Mexican American Andy Ruiz Jr. by a narrow majority points decision for the WBO belt. Jimmy 'Thunder' Peau held the IBO heavyweight title from 1994 to 1995. David Tua challenged Englishman Lennox Lewis on 11 November 2000 for the WBC and IBF world heavyweight titles, losing by unanimous points decision. On 26 April 2014, Alex Leapai challenged long-reigning WBO, WBA Super and IBF world heavyweight champion Ukrainian Wladimir Klitschko, losing by fifth round stoppage. Having been wrested of his WBA world title by German Felix Sturm on 11 March 2006, Maselino Masoe would later challenge Hungarian Károly Balzsay on 25 April 2009 for the WBO super middleweight title, losing by TKO in the 11th round. On 2 July 2022, Australian Jai Opetaia became the third Samoan to win a major world championship in the professional ranks, wresting the IBF, Lineal and Ring titles from Latvian Mairis Briedis by split decision.

==== Amateur boxing ====
In 2011, Jai Opetaia became the first Samoan amateur boxer to win a world championship by taking the light heavyweight gold medal at the 2011 AIBA Youth World Boxing Championships in Astana. While renowned for his punching power during his professional career, David Tua also had a proven amateur career, winning bronze medals at the 1992 Summer Olympics and 1991 World Amateur Boxing Championships while representing New Zealand. During his amateur career, Jimmy Peau won the gold medal in the heavyweight division for New Zealand at the 1986 Commonwealth Games. Amateur boxers representing Samoa have performed well at various Commonwealth Games, winning silver and bronze medals dating back to 1974.

=== Kickboxing ===
In 2001, unheralded newcomer Mark Hunt won the K-1 World Grand Prix defeating Frenchman Jerome LeBanner (2nd round KO), German Stefan Leko (unanimous points decision) and Brazilian Francisco Filho (extended round unanimous points decision) in a single night to become the only non-European fighter to win the prestigious event. Crowd favourite Ray Sefo had reached the K-1 World Grand Prix final in 2000, losing to Dutchman Ernesto Hoost by unanimous points decision. On February 25, 2018, Genah Fabian became the first woman of Samoan descent to win a World Muaythai Council (WMC) world title.

=== Mixed martial arts (MMA) ===
Mixed martial arts is a growing sport among ethnic Samoans all over the world. Mixed martial artists of Samoan descent who have fought in the Ultimate Fighting Championships (UFC) are Mark Hunt, Max Holloway, Kendall Grove, Andre Fili, Robert Whittaker, Tyson Pedro, Tai Tuivasa, Maki Pitolo, Justin Tafa, Carlos Ulberg, Falaniko Vitale and Kailin Curran. Both Whittaker and Grove are previous tournament winners of The Ultimate Fighter in the middleweight and welterweight divisions respectively. On 10 December 2016, Max Holloway became the first fighter of Samoan descent to win a UFC world title, taking the interim strap, defeating fellow American Anthony Pettis by third round TKO at UFC 206. On 8 July 2017, he was followed by Robert Whittaker who became the UFC interim world middleweight champion, defeating Cuban Yoel Romero by points decision at UFC 213. The interim championship status of Whittaker would eventually be elevated to undisputed when incumbent champion Georges St-Pierre retired in late 2017. On 4 June 2017 at UFC 212, interim champion Max Holloway would go on to stop reigning champion Brazilian Jose Aldo in the third round of their unification bout to determine the undisputed UFC world featherweight championship. At the 2017 World MMA Awards, Holloway was named the Charles 'Mask' Lewis Fighter of the year with Whittaker named International Fighter of the year. In another MMA organization, on September 24, 2016, Siala-Mou Siliga won the Road FC Openweight Tournament at Road FC 33.

=== Netball ===
Netball is one of the most popular sports for girls in Samoa, usually played during the winter. In recent years, the sport has become more popular for men to play on island. Samoa's national team has qualified for every INF Netball World Cup since 1991. The team also competes at every Pacific Games where they have won silver and bronze medals.

=== Volleyball ===
Volleyball is a popular sport in Samoa and participation rates continue to grow. Many players of Samoan descent can be seen at international competitions representing Samoa, American Samoa, New Zealand, Australia and the United States in both Volleyball and Beach volleyball. Eric Fonoimoana (along with partner Dain Blanton representing the United States) won the gold medal for Beach volleyball at the 2000 Sydney Olympics.

=== Sumo wrestling ===
In the world of Sumo, Fiamalu Penitani became just the second non-Japanese-born wrestler to reach yokozuna, the highest rank in the sport. Saleva'a Fuauli Atisano'e was the first non-Japanese-born wrestler to reach ōzeki, the second-highest rank in the sport. Kilifi Sapa is known for being the third non-Japanese-born wrestler to reach the top division. However, his highest rank was maegashira, the lowest of five ranks in the makuuchi division.

=== Professional wrestling ===
A number of Samoans have ventured into professional wrestling. High chief Peter Maivia was the first Samoan to crack the big circuits. His influence spawned the careers of his grandson, Dwayne "The Rock" Johnson and first cousin once removed; Savelina Fanene. Following in Maivia's footsteps, the prominent Anoaʻi family led by stalwarts Afa and Sika Anoaʻi. Other prominent Anoaʻi family members are Leati Anoaʻi, Rodney Anoaʻi, Solofa Fatu, and Edward Fatu are known for their work in WWE. Other notable Samoan wrestlers include Sarona Snuka, Nuufolau Seanoa, Cheree Crowley, Danielle Kamela, Emily Dole, and Sonny Siaki.

== Other sports ==
Several Samoans have won medals at the Summer Olympic Games and other international events. Ele Opeloge created history for Samoa by earning the nation's first ever Olympic medal, a silver in the Women's +75 kg Weightlifting class at the 2008 Summer Olympics.

Greg Louganis won four gold medals and one silver for Diving in consecutive Games from 1976 to 1988 representing the United States. Louganis also took five gold medals at the FINA World Aquatics Championships. In 1984, Robin Leamy won a gold medal for swimming as a member of the United States men's 4×100-meter freestyle relay team.

Tumua Anae and Sami Hill have won gold medals with the United States women's Water polo squad at the 2012 Summer Olympics and 2016 Summer Olympics respectively.

Rugby sevens players of Samoan descent played in the women's gold medal final at the 2016 Summer Olympics. Evania Pelite took home a gold medal representing Australia while Ruby Tui, Theresa Fitzpatrick, and Niall Williams won silver medals for New Zealand .

Samoan New Zealander Beatrice Faumuina won the gold medal for Discus at the 1997 World Championships in Athletics. She would compete at four Olympic Games from 1996 to 2008, her highest placing - 6th in 2004.

In Professional bodybuilding, Samoan Sonny Schmidt became the first Pacific Islander to win a Mr. Olympia event when he was crowned the 1995 Masters Olympia winner for contestants over 40 years of age.

== Stadiums in Samoa ==
Stadium	Capacity	City	Tenants	Image
Apia Park	12,000	Apia	Rugby union: Samoa national rugby union team	

== See also ==
- Sports in American Samoa
- Sport in Oceania
- Lists of stadiums
