= Basketball at the 2023 Pacific Games – Women's tournament =

Tournament details
- Host country: Solomon Islands
- City: Honiara
- Dates: 17–25 November 2023
- Teams: 8 (from 1 confederation)
- Venue: 1 (in 1 host city)

Final positions
- Champions: Tahiti (6th title)
- Runners-up: Cook Islands
- Third place: Fiji
- Fourth place: Samoa

Tournament statistics
- Games played: 20
- Top scorer: (Guam) Destiny Castro (19.2 ppg)

Official website
- 2023 Pacific Games

The women's basketball tournament at the 2023 Pacific Games was the 16th edition of the event for women at the Pacific Games. It was held from 17 to 25 November 2023. All games were played at the Friendship Hall in Honiara, Solomon Islands.

== Format ==
The eight teams were split into two groups of four teams, and a single round-robin was held within each group. The first-placed teams of each group advanced straight into the semifinals with the second- and third-placed teams playing a two match qualifying finals before advancing. After the preliminary round, the teams were matched according to their results with the playoffs featuring only six teams (top three of each group). From there on a knockout system was used.

== Schedule ==
The schedule of the tournament is as follows.

| G | Group stage | Q | Qualifying finals | C | Classification | ¼ | Quarterfinals | ½ | Semifinals | F | Finals |

| Event↓/Date → | 17th Fri | 18th Sat | 19th Sun | 20th Mon | 21st Tue | 22nd Wed | 23rd Thu | 24th Fri | 25th Sat |
|---|---|---|---|---|---|---|---|---|---|
| Women | G | G | G | G | G | Q | C | ½ | F |

== Qualified teams ==
| Qualification method | Date | Berths | Qualified teams |
|---|---|---|---|
| Host nation | 11 May 2016 | 1 | Solomon Islands |
| 2022 FIBA Women's Micronesian Cup | 8−11 June 2022 | 1 | Guam |
| 2022 FIBA Women's Melanesian Cup | 26−29 October 2022 | 2 | Fiji; Papua New Guinea |
| 2022 FIBA Women's Polynesian Cup | 1−5 November 2022 | 2 | Cook Islands; Samoa |
| Wildcards | 16 December 2022 | 2 | ~~New Caledonia~~ (Note: The Territorial Olympic and Sports Committee of New Caledonia withdrew their women's 5×5 team citing the team's lack of competitiveness.) (French Polynesia) Tahiti; Tonga (Note: Tongan women's 5×5 team became the eighth team following New Caledonia's withdrawal.) |
| Total | | 8 | |

== Group stage ==
=== Group A ===
| Pos | Team | Pld | W | L | PF | PA | PD | Pts | Qualification |
|---|---|---|---|---|---|---|---|---|---|
| 1 | Samoa | 3 | 3 | 0 | 227 | 164 | +63 | 6 | Semifinals |
| 2 | Fiji | 3 | 2 | 1 | 211 | 158 | +53 | 5 | Quarterfinals |
| 3 | Guam | 3 | 1 | 2 | 140 | 168 | −28 | 4 | Quarterfinals |
| 4 | Solomon Islands (H) | 3 | 0 | 3 | 133 | 221 | −88 | 3 | 7th place game |

Source: FIBA
Rules for classification: 1. points, 2. HTH points, 3. HTH game-point difference, 4. HTH game-points scored, 5. game-point difference, 6. game-points scored, 7. FIBA World Ranking
(H) Hosts

17 November 2023
19:30

Report

| Samoa | 83–46 | Solomon Islands |
Scoring by quarter: 16–21, 25–9, 25–5, 17–11
| Pts: Paraha, Filemu 19; Rebs: Oloapu, Tutani 7 Asts: Tutani 3 | | Pts: Kio 17; Rebs: Animamu 9 Asts: Animamu 3 |

Friendship Hall, Honiara

18 November 2023
13:30

Report

| Solomon Islands | 43–82 | Fiji |
Scoring by quarter: 14–21, 11–29, 3–12, 15–20
| Pts: Basia 12; Rebs: Animamu 7 Asts: three players 1 | | Pts: Koyamainavure 22; Rebs: Vocea 10; Asts: Mendez 4 |

Friendship Hall, Honiara
Attendance: 224

18 November 2023
15:45

Report

| Guam | 44–69 | Samoa |
Scoring by quarter: 16–19, 6–19, 14–16, 8–15
| Pts: Pangilinan 13; Rebs: Benito 12; Asts: Pardilla 2 | | Pts: Paraha 17; Rebs: Fualau 8 Asts: three players 2 |

Friendship Hall, Honiara

19 November 2023
11:15

Report

| Fiji | 55–40 | Guam |
Scoring by quarter: 14–10, 9–9, 18–19, 14–2
| Pts: Kenny 19; Rebs: Kenny 14; Asts: Koyamainavure 4 | | Pts: Castro 18; Rebs: Benito, Bailey 9 Asts: Pangilinan 2 |

Friendship Hall, Honiara

20 November 2023
09:00

Report

| Samoa | 75–74 | Fiji |
Scoring by quarter: 13–16, 21–23, 23–13, 18–22
| Pts: Filemu 21; Rebs: Oloapu 11; Asts: three players 2 | | Pts: Koyamainavure, Vocea 17; Rebs: Vocea 9 Asts: Koyamainavure 3 |

Friendship Hall, Honiara

20 November 2023
20:15

Report

| Solomon Islands | 44–56 | Guam |
Scoring by quarter: 18–23, 4–16, 13–12, 9–5
| Pts: Basia 12; Rebs: Basia 14; Asts: three players 1 | | Pts: Castro 32; Rebs: Benito 10; Asts: Pangilinan 2 |

Friendship Hall, Honiara

=== Group B ===
| Pos | Team | Pld | W | L | PF | PA | PD | Pts | Qualification |
|---|---|---|---|---|---|---|---|---|---|
| 1 | Cook Islands | 3 | 3 | 0 | 190 | 135 | +55 | 6 | Semifinals |
| 2 | Tahiti | 3 | 2 | 1 | 200 | 137 | +63 | 5 | Quarterfinals |
| 3 | Tonga | 3 | 1 | 2 | 155 | 184 | −29 | 4 | Quarterfinals |
| 4 | Papua New Guinea | 3 | 0 | 3 | 121 | 210 | −89 | 3 | 7th place game |

Source: FIBA
Rules for classification: 1. points, 2. HTH points, 3. HTH game-point difference, 4. HTH game-points scored, 5. game-point difference, 6. game-points scored, 7. FIBA World Ranking

17 November 2023
12:00

Report

| Tonga | 44–76 | Cook Islands |
Scoring by quarter: 15–15, 10–23, 10–23, 9–15
| Pts: Puloka 14; Rebs: Enari 10; Asts: Puloka 2 | | Pts: Sopoaga 17; Rebs: Sopoaga 10; Asts: Tuaiti 6 |

Friendship Hall, Honiara

17 November 2023
14:30

Report

| Tahiti | 84–38 | Papua New Guinea |
Scoring by quarter: 25–8, 26–11, 21–5, 12–14
| Pts: Tavanae 15; Rebs: Tavanae, Lefranc 9 Asts: Teissier 3 | | Pts: Asiba 9 Rebs: Hane 12; Asts: Kairi, Warabe 2 |

Friendship Hall, Honiara

20 November 2023
13:30

Report

| Papua New Guinea | 37–59 | Cook Islands |
Scoring by quarter: 11–9, 5–17, 10–16, 11–17
| Pts: Hane 11; Rebs: Hane 10; Asts: Hane, Dobunaba 1 | | Pts: Tuaiti 21; Rebs: Tuaiti 10; Asts: Tuaiti 3 |

Friendship Hall, Honiara

20 November 2023
15:45

Report

| Tahiti | 62–44 | Tonga |
Scoring by quarter: 9–14, 18–11, 16–15, 19–4
| Pts: Teissier 20; Rebs: Tavanae 10; Asts: Tavanae 4 | | Pts: Manupule 20; Rebs: Puloka 10; Asts: Puloka 2 |

Friendship Hall, Honiara

21 November 2023
11:15

Report

| Tonga | 67–46 | Papua New Guinea |
Scoring by quarter: 19–14, 11–12, 20–8, 17–12
| Pts: Puloka 23; Rebs: Uaine 13; Asts: Uaine 2 | | Pts: Hane 17; Rebs: Hane 18; Asts: Muri 3 |

Friendship Hall, Honiara

21 November 2023
18:00

Report

| Cook Islands | 55–54 | Tahiti |
Scoring by quarter: 8–14, 15–14, 16–10, 16–16
| Pts: Pilitati 12; Rebs: Lewis 13; Asts: Tuaiti 4 | | Pts: Lefranc 10; Rebs: Tavanae 10; Asts: Ching-Bellais 3 |

Friendship Hall, Honiara

== Playoffs ==
=== Brackets ===
Quarterfinals
22 November
Guam | 56
Tahiti | 64
22 November
Fiji | 75
Tonga | 46

Semifinals
24 November
Samoa | 55
Tahiti | 56
24 November
Cook Islands | 51
Fiji | 50

Final
25 November
Tahiti | 53
Cook Islands | 46
3rd place game
25 November
Samoa | 55
Fiji | 63

| 5th place game |
| 23 November |
| Tonga | 48 |
| Guam | 56 |

| 7th place game |
| 23 November |
| Solomon Islands | 38 |
| Papua New Guinea | 47 |

=== Quarterfinals ===
22 November 2023
12:00

Report

| Fiji | 75–46 | Tonga |
Scoring by quarter: 15–15, 20–9, 19–15, 21–7

Friendship Hall, Honiara

22 November 2023
19:30

Report

| Guam | 56–64 | Tahiti |
Scoring by quarter: 9–20, 17–20, 16–7, 14–17

Friendship Hall, Honiara

=== 7th place game ===
23 November 2023
14:30

Report

| Solomon Islands | 38–47 | Papua New Guinea |
Scoring by quarter: 12–8, 5–14, 11–16, 10–9

Friendship Hall, Honiara

=== 5th place game ===
23 November 2023
19:30

Report

| Tonga | 48–56 | Guam |
Scoring by quarter: 18–18, 16–5, 6–15, 8–18

Friendship Hall, Honiara

=== Semifinals ===
24 November 2023
12:00

Report

| Samoa | 55–56 | Tahiti |
Scoring by quarter: 18–11, 13–13, 6–18, 18–14

Friendship Hall, Honiara

24 November 2023
14:30

Report

| Cook Islands | 51–50 | Fiji |
Scoring by quarter: 13–12, 8–8, 13–14, 17–16

Friendship Hall, Honiara

=== 3rd place game ===
25 November 2023
9:00

Report

| Samoa | 55–63 | Fiji |
Scoring by quarter: 21–17, 8–14, 12–22, 14–10

Friendship Hall, Honiara

=== Final ===
25 November 2023
14:00

Report

| Tahiti | 53–46 | Cook Islands |
Scoring by quarter: 8–11, 17–19, 10–10, 18–6

Friendship Hall, Honiara

== Final standings ==
| Rank | Team |
|---|---|
| 1st place, gold medalist(s) | Tahiti |
| 2nd place, silver medalist(s) | Cook Islands |
| 3rd place, bronze medalist(s) | Fiji |
| 4 | Samoa |
| 5 | Guam |
| 6 | Tonga |
| 7 | Papua New Guinea |
| 8 | Solomon Islands |
