= 2007 FIBA Oceania Championship for Women =

FIBA Oceania Championship for Women 2007
12th FIBA Oceanian Women's Basketball Championship

Tournament details
- Host country: New Zealand
- Dates: 26–29 September
- Teams: 3 (from 21 federations)
- Venue: 1 (in 1 host city)

Final positions
- Champions: Australia (12th title)

FIBA Oceania Championship for Women 2007 is the qualifying tournament of FIBA Oceania for the women's basketball tournament at the 2008 Summer Olympics at Beijing. The tournament was a three-way contest between:

- Australia
- New Zealand
- Fiji (The winner of the Pacific Games held in Apia, Samoa)

It was held in Dunedin, New Zealand from 26 to 29 September.

Australia has already qualified for Beijing as winners of the 2006 World Championship.

The higher ranked team at the championship out of New Zealand and Fiji received direct entry to the Olympic tournament (Subject to approval from the nation's local Olympic committee).

The other took part in the World Olympic Qualifying Tournament in June, 2008.

== Pacific Games ==
The Pacific Games basketball tournament was held in Apia, Samoa from 29 August to 7 September.

The tournament was played as a single round robin with the top two teams finishing on top of the ladder play-off to determine who advanced to the FIBA Oceania Championship in Dunedin, New Zealand

=== Standings ===
Qualified for the gold medal game

=== Preliminary round ===
Team	Pts.	W	L	PCT
Fiji	14	6	0	1.000
American Samoa	13	5	1	.833
Tahiti	12	4	2	.667
Papua New Guinea	11	3	3	.500
Samoa	10	2	4	.333
New Caledonia	9	1	5	.167
Solomon Islands	8	0	6	.000

=== Playoffs ===
6 September

5th place

Samoa	72–54	New Caledonia

Court 1, Apia

7 September

Bronze

Tahiti	59–70	Papua New Guinea

Court 2, Apia

7 September

Gold

Fiji	70–62	American Samoa

Court 1, Apia

== Schedule ==
Qualified for the finals

=== Preliminary round ===
Team	Pts.	W	L	PCT
Australia	4	2	0	1.000
New Zealand	3	1	1	0.500
Fiji	2	0	2	0.000

26 September

New Zealand	46–78	Australia

Edgar Centre, Dunedin

27 September

Australia	136–32	Fiji

Edgar Centre, Dunedin

28 September

New Zealand	118–31	Fiji

Edgar Centre, Dunedin

=== Final ===
29 September

Australia	87–46	New Zealand

Edgar Centre, Dunedin

== Olympic qualification ==
Since Australia are the defending world champions, they qualified outright to the Olympics. Therefore, the berth reserved for Oceanian champions (Australia) went to New Zealand. The Oceanian runners'-up berth to the FIBA World Olympic Qualifying Tournament for Women went to Fiji.

- Australia qualified as world champions.
- New Zealand qualified as Oceanian runners-up.
- Fiji qualified to the FIBA World Olympic Qualifying Tournament for Women 2008.
