= 2022 FIBA Women's Polynesian Cup =

2022 edition of the FIBA Women's Polynesian Basketball Cup

2nd FIBA Women's Polynesian Cup

Tournament details
- Host country: Cook Islands (New Zealand)
- City: Kaitaia
- Dates: 1−5 November
- Teams: 5 (from 1 sub-confederation)
- Venue: 1 (in 1 host city)

Final positions
- Champions: Cook Islands (2nd title)
- Runners-up: Samoa
- Third place: Tahiti

Tournament statistics
- Top scorer: (Samoa) Leaupepe (31.3)
- Top rebounds: (Cook Islands) Sadler (13.3)
- Top assists: (Samoa) Leaupepe (5.0)
- PPG (Team): Samoa (82.8)
- RPG (Team): Cook Islands, Samoa (50.5)
- APG (Team): Cook Islands (12.0)

Official website
- www.fiba.basketball/history

The 2022 FIBA Women's Polynesian Cup was the second edition of the FIBA Polynesian Cup, an international women's basketball tournament contested by national teams of the Polynesian sub-zone of FIBA Oceania. The tournament, along with the men's event, was oficially hosted by Cook Islands, although the entire tournament program took place at the Puna Ora Gymnasium in Kaitaia, New Zealand. The tournament was originally slated to be held in September 2021, the schedule was pushed further to April 2022 due to COVID-19 pandemic, with the final dates determined to be held on 1–5 November 2022.

The tournament also served as a sub-regional qualifier for the basketball event of the 2023 Pacific Games in Solomon Islands with two berths for Polynesia allocated for that event, which served as the official qualifier for the FIBA Asia Cup Pre-Qualifiers.

The Cook Islands successfully defended their title after sweeping all opponents in this single round-robin tournament. Along with second-placer Samoa, they earned the right to represent Polynesia in the women's basketball tournament of the 2023 Pacific Games.

== Participating teams ==
- American Samoa
- Cook Islands (Host)
- Samoa
- Tahiti
- Tonga

== Round robin ==
Pos	Team	Pld	W	L	PF	PA	PD	Pts	Final result
1	Cook Islands (H)	4	4	0	304	250	+54	8	Gold medal
2	Samoa	4	3	1	331	252	+79	7	Silver medal
3	Tahiti	4	2	2	248	237	+11	6	Bronze medal
4	American Samoa	4	1	3	290	323	−33	5	
5	Tonga	4	0	4	239	350	−111	4	

Source: FIBA
Rules for classification: 1) Points; 2) Head-to-head results; 3) Points difference; 4) Points scored.
(H) Hosts

1 November 2022
12:00

Boxscore

Tahiti	83–37	Tonga
Scoring by quarter: 23–8, 19–5, 20–12, 21–12
Pts: Lextreyt 17; Rebs: 4 players 5 Asts: Vaiho 5		Pts: L. Finau 22; Rebs: F. Finau 13; Asts: N. Enari, K. Enari 1

Puna Ora Gymnasium, Kaitaia, New Zealand

1 November 2022
17:00

Boxscore

Cook Islands	87–75	American Samoa
Scoring by quarter: 25–20, 24–11, 15–24, 23–20
Pts: Sadler 19; Rebs: Sadler, Tuaiti 10; Asts: K. Lewis 3		Pts: Nawahine 25; Rebs: Tanuvasa 8 Asts: Hannemann-Gago 5

Puna Ora Gymnasium, Kaitaia, New Zealand

2 November 2022
12:00

Boxscore

American Samoa	59–65	Tahiti
Scoring by quarter: 16–19, 22–14, 9–21, 12–11
Pts: Tanuvasa 17; Rebs: Hannemann-Gago 10; Asts: Nawahine 4		Pts: Lefranc 21; Rebs: Lefranc 9 Asts: Lefranc 5

Puna Ora Gymnasium, Kaitaia, New Zealand

2 November 2022
14:30

Boxscore

Tonga	63–96	Samoa
Scoring by quarter: 21–33, 12–23, 15–24, 15–16
Pts: L. Finau 29; Rebs: L. Finau, F. Finau 7 Asts: L. Finau 4		Pts: Leaupepe 34; Rebs: Oloapu 15; Asts: Siamoa 4

Puna Ora Gymnasium, Kaitaia, New Zealand

3 November 2022
12:00

Boxscore

Samoa	76–79	Cook Islands
Scoring by quarter: 21–28, 16–20, 26–15, 13–16
Pts: Leaupepe 38; Rebs: Tutani 11; Asts: Leaupepe 6		Pts: Sadler 25; Rebs: Sadler 18; Asts: three players 3

Puna Ora Gymnasium, Kaitaia, New Zealand

3 November 2022
14:30

Boxscore

American Samoa	98–88	Tonga
Scoring by quarter: 30–30, 35–20, 11–23, 22–15
Pts: Nawahine 37; Rebs: Hannemann-Gago 11; Asts: Nawahine 6		Pts: L. Finau 36; Rebs: L. Finau, A. Enari 10; Asts: L. Finau 5

Puna Ora Gymnasium, Kaitaia, New Zealand

4 November 2022
17:00

Boxscore

Samoa	76–52	Tahiti
Scoring by quarter: 17–4, 20–17, 16–14, 23–17
Pts: Tutani 18; Rebs: Oloapu 14; Asts: Oloapu, Leaupepe 4		Pts: Lextreyt 17; Rebs: Lefranc 6 Asts: Viriamu 7

Puna Ora Gymnasium, Kaitaia, New Zealand

4 November 2022
19:30

Boxscore

Tonga	51–73	Cook Islands
Scoring by quarter: 15–18, 13–21, 9–12, 14–22
Pts: L. Finau 20; Rebs: Uaine 9 Asts: L. Finau, F. Finau 2		Pts: Sadler 20; Rebs: Sadler 19; Asts: Pilitati, Tuaiti 4

Puna Ora Gymnasium, Kaitaia, New Zealand

5 November 2022
12:00

Boxscore

American Samoa	58–83	Samoa
Scoring by quarter: 15–20, 11–22, 14–23, 18–18
Pts: Nawahine 29; Rebs: Nawahine 13; Asts: Nawahine, Tanuvasa 3		Pts: Leaupepe 37; Rebs: Oloapu 13; Asts: Leaupepe 7

Puna Ora Gymnasium, Kaitaia, New Zealand

5 November 2022
19:30

Boxscore

Cook Islands	65–48	Tahiti
Scoring by quarter: 13–16, 18–5, 16–10, 18–17
Pts: Sadler 22; Rebs: Whaanga-Ashin 11; Asts: Tuaiti 7		Pts: H. Teissier 18; Rebs: H. Teissier 6 Asts: Lextreyt 2

Puna Ora Gymnasium, Kaitaia, New Zealand

== Final standings ==
Legend
Qualified for the 2023 Pacific Games

Rank	Team	Record
1st place, gold medalist(s)	Cook Islands	4–0
2nd place, silver medalist(s)	Samoa	3–1
3rd place, bronze medalist(s)	Tahiti	2–2
4	American Samoa	1–3
5	Tonga	0–4

== Awards ==
2022 FIBA Women's Polynesian champions

Cook Islands
2nd title

- All-Star Team:
  - (Samoa) Malama Leaupepe
  - (Cook Islands) Terai Sadler
  - (American Samoa) Malia Nawahine
  - (French Polynesia) Maea Lextreyt
  - (Tonga) Lesila Finau

== See also ==
- Basketball at the 2023 Pacific Games
