= 2022 FIBA Polynesian Cup =

2nd FIBA Polynesian Cup

Tournament details
- Host country: Cook Islands (New Zealand)
- City: Kaitaia
- Dates: 1−5 November
- Teams: 5 (from 1 sub-confederation)
- Venue: 1 (in 1 host city)

Final positions
- Champions: Tahiti (2nd title)
- Runners-up: Tonga
- Third place: Samoa

Tournament statistics
- Games played: 10
- Top scorer: (Samoa) Saipaia (25.5)
- Top rebounds: (Cook Islands) Bluegum/Teiti (11.0)
- Top assists: (Samoa) Saipaia (4.3)
- PPG (Team): Samoa (100.0)
- RPG (Team): Samoa (58.5)
- APG (Team): Tonga (13.0)

Official website
- www.fiba.basketball/history

The 2022 FIBA Polynesian Cup was the second edition of the FIBA Polynesian Cup, an international men's basketball tournament contested by national teams of the Polynesian sub-zone of FIBA Oceania. The tournament, along with the women's event, was oficially hosted by Cook Islands, although the entire tournament program took place at the Puna Ora Gymnasium in Kaitaia, New Zealand. The tournament was originally slated to be held in September 2021, the schedule was pushed further to April 2022 due to COVID-19 pandemic, with the final dates determined to be held on 1–5 November 2022.

The tournament also served as a sub-regional qualifier for the basketball event of the 2023 Pacific Games in Solomon Islands with two berths for Polynesia allocated for that event, which served as the official qualifier for the FIBA Asia Cup Pre-Qualifiers.

Tahiti successfully defended their title after sweeping all opponents in this single round-robin tournament. Along with second-placer Tonga, they earned the right to represent Polynesia in the men's basketball tournament of the 2023 Pacific Games.

== Participating teams ==
- American Samoa
- Cook Islands (Host)
- Samoa
- Tahiti
- Tonga

== Round robin ==
Pos	Team	Pld	W	L	PF	PA	PD	Pts	Final result
1	Tahiti	4	4	0	359	255	+104	8	Gold medal
2	Tonga	4	3	1	314	256	+58	7	Silver medal
3	Samoa	4	2	2	400	294	+106	6	Bronze medal
4	American Samoa	4	1	3	258	354	−96	5	
5	Cook Islands (H)	4	0	4	234	406	−172	4	

Source: FIBA
Rules for classification: 1) Points; 2) Head-to-head results; 3) Points difference; 4) Points scored.
(H) Hosts

1 November 2022
14:30

Boxscore

American Samoa	50–86	Tahiti
Scoring by quarter: 8–20, 14–24, 16–16, 12–26
Pts: Burton 13; Rebs: Tuimaseve 11; Asts: Folasa 1		Pts: Meuel 16; Rebs: Roopina 6 Asts: Teriitemataua 3

Puna Ora Gymnasium, Kaitaia, New Zealand

1 November 2022
19:30

Boxscore

Cook Islands	42–124	Samoa
Scoring by quarter: 11–25, 11–37, 13–29, 7–33
Pts: Bluegum 16; Rebs: Marsters 8 Asts: Marsters 3		Pts: Saipaia 27; Rebs: E. Keil 10; Asts: Saipaia 5

Puna Ora Gymnasium, Kaitaia, New Zealand

2 November 2022
17:00

Boxscore

Samoa	106–70	American Samoa
Scoring by quarter: 35–19, 19–17, 14–20, 38–14
Pts: Saipaia 34; Rebs: E. Keil, Taupau 9 Asts: Saipaia 8		Pts: Tuimaseve 15; Rebs: Tuimaseve, Sofara 8 Asts: Folasa 2

Puna Ora Gymnasium, Kaitaia, New Zealand

2 November 2022
19:30

Boxscore

Cook Islands	50–87	Tonga
Scoring by quarter: 10–22, 12–23, 19–23, 9–19
Pts: Bland 15; Rebs: Teiti, Bluegum 12; Asts: four players 1		Pts: Alipate, S. Paea 18; Rebs: Bain-Vete 12; Asts: Alipate, O. Paea 4

Puna Ora Gymnasium, Kaitaia, New Zealand

3 November 2022
17:00

Boxscore

Tahiti	77–65	Tonga
Scoring by quarter: 16–20, 23–15, 15–14, 23–16
Pts: Teriitemataua 14; Rebs: Roopina 10; Asts: Meuel 4		Pts: Foketi 23; Rebs: Foketi 9 Asts: three players 3

Puna Ora Gymnasium, Kaitaia, New Zealand

3 November 2022
19:30

Boxscore

American Samoa	91–90 (OT)	Cook Islands
Scoring by quarter: 23–19, 18–24, 22–14, 11–17, Overtime: 17–16
Pts: Burton 26; Rebs: Sofara 11; Asts: Samuelu, Su'A 2		Pts: Teiti 22; Rebs: Bluegum 19; Asts: Bluegum 2

Puna Ora Gymnasium, Kaitaia, New Zealand

4 November 2022
12:00

Boxscore

Tonga	90–82	Samoa
Scoring by quarter: 18–13, 17–21, 23–27, 32–21
Pts: Foketi 30; Rebs: Foketi 10; Asts: Alipate, O. Paea 3		Pts: Sio 18; Rebs: Sio 16; Asts: Matautia 6

Puna Ora Gymnasium, Kaitaia, New Zealand

4 November 2022
14:30

Boxscore

Cook Islands	52–104	Tahiti
Scoring by quarter: 12–24, 19–42, 10–19, 11–19
Pts: Bluegum 17; Rebs: Teiti 13; Asts: three players 1		Pts: Meuel 27; Rebs: Garbutt 10; Asts: Teriitemataua, Sommers 3

Puna Ora Gymnasium, Kaitaia, New Zealand

5 November 2022
14:30

Boxscore

American Samoa	47–72	Tonga
Scoring by quarter: 12–22, 14–21, 9–16, 12–13
Pts: Sofara 12; Rebs: Sofara 10; Asts: Folasa 3		Pts: Foketi 17; Rebs: Kioa 9 Asts: O. Paea, Foketi 4

Puna Ora Gymnasium, Kaitaia, New Zealand

5 November 2022
17:00

Boxscore

Samoa	88–92	Tahiti
Scoring by quarter: 22–15, 29–16, 21–30, 16–31
Pts: Saipaia 33; Rebs: Sio 12; Asts: Saipaia, Matautia 3		Pts: Meuel 34; Rebs: Meuel 10; Asts: Sommers, Roopina 3

Puna Ora Gymnasium, Kaitaia, New Zealand

== Final standings ==
Legend
Qualified for the 2023 Pacific Games

Rank	Team	Record
1st place, gold medalist(s)	Tahiti	4–0
2nd place, silver medalist(s)	Tonga	3–1
3rd place, bronze medalist(s)	Samoa	2–2
4	American Samoa	1–3
5	Cook Islands	0–4

== Awards ==
2022 FIBA Polynesian champions

Tahiti
2nd title

- All-Star Team:
  - (Tonga) Viliami Foketi
  - (Samoa) Shareef Saipaia
  - (French Polynesia) Larry Teriitemataua
  - (Tonga) Marcus Alipate
  - (French Polynesia) Ariirimarau Meuel

== See also ==
- Basketball at the 2023 Pacific Games
