= Basketball at the 2008 Summer Olympics – Women's qualification =

The qualification for the Basketball at the 2008 Summer Olympics – Women's tournament took place between 2006 and 2008; all five FIBA zones sent in teams.

The first qualifying tournament was the 2006 FIBA World Championship for Women in which the champion was guaranteed of a place in the Olympics. Throughout the next two years, several regional tournaments served as qualification for the zonal tournaments, which doubles as continental championships, to determine which teams will participate in the 2008 Beijing Summer Olympics.

== Qualification ==
=== Outright qualification ===
A total of 12 teams will take part in the Olympics, with each NOC sending in one team. The host nation (the People's Republic of China) qualifies automatically as hosts.

There are a total of 5 zonal tournaments (doubling as continental championships) that determined the qualifying teams, with a total of 5 teams qualifying outright. Each zone was allocated with the following qualifying berths:

- FIBA Africa: 1 team (Champion)
- FIBA Americas: 1 teams (Champion)
- FIBA Asia: 1 team (Champion)
- FIBA Europe: 1 teams (Champion)
- FIBA Oceania: 1 team (Champion)

Furthermore, the current world champion, Australia qualified automatically by winning at the 2006 FIBA World Championship for Women.

=== Qualification via the wildcard tournament ===
The additional five teams will be determined at the FIBA World Olympic Qualifying Tournament for Women 2008, with the best non-qualifying teams participating from teams that did not qualify outright. Each zone is allocated with the following berths:

- FIBA Africa: 2 teams
- FIBA Americas: 3 teams
- FIBA Asia: 2 teams
- FIBA Europe: 4 teams
- FIBA Oceania: 1 team

== Summary ==
Qualified for the Olympics outright
Qualified automatically
Qualified for the Wildcard Tournament

These are the final standings of the different Olympic qualifying tournaments. The venues are as follows, with the city of the knockout stage mentioned first:

- 2006 FIBA World Championship for Women: São Paulo and Barueri, Brazil
- FIBA Africa Championship for Women 2007: Dakar and Thies, Senegal
- FIBA Americas Championship for Women 2007: Valdivia, Chile
- FIBA Asia Championship for Women 2007: Incheon, South Korea
- EuroBasket Women 2007: Chieti, Vasto, Lanciano, and Ortona, Italy
- FIBA Oceania Championship for Women 2007: Dunedin, New Zealand
- FIBA World Olympic Qualifying Tournament for Women 2008: Madrid, Spain

Rank	World	Africa	Americas	Asia	Europe	Oceania	Wildcard
1st	Australia	Mali	United States	South Korea	Russia	Australia	Spain; Czech Republic; Latvia; Belarus; Ranked 1st
2nd	Russia	Senegal	Cuba	China	Spain	New Zealand	Spain; Czech Republic; Latvia; Belarus; Ranked 1st
3rd	United States	Angola	Brazil	Japan	Belarus	Fiji	Spain; Czech Republic; Latvia; Belarus; Ranked 1st
4th	Brazil	Mozambique	Argentina	Chinese Taipei	Latvia		Spain; Czech Republic; Latvia; Belarus; Ranked 1st
5th	France	Nigeria	Canada	Thailand	Czech Rep.		Brazil
6th	Lithuania	Cameroon	Chile	Malaysia	Lithuania		Cuba
7th	Czech Rep.	DR Congo	Mexico	India	Belgium		Japan; Angola; Ranked 7th
8th	Spain	Ivory Coast	Jamaica	Hong Kong	France		Japan; Angola; Ranked 7th
9th	Argentina	Cape Verde		Uzbekistan	Turkey; Germany; Italy; Serbia; Ranked 9th		Senegal; Argentina; Fiji; Chinese Taipei; Ranked 9th
10th	Canada	Madagascar		Vietnam	Turkey; Germany; Italy; Serbia; Ranked 9th		Senegal; Argentina; Fiji; Chinese Taipei; Ranked 9th
11th	Cuba	Tunisia		Singapore	Turkey; Germany; Italy; Serbia; Ranked 9th		Senegal; Argentina; Fiji; Chinese Taipei; Ranked 9th
12th	China	Kenya		Sri Lanka	Turkey; Germany; Italy; Serbia; Ranked 9th		Senegal; Argentina; Fiji; Chinese Taipei; Ranked 9th
13th	South Korea				Israel; Romania; Greece; Croatia; Ranked 13th		
14th	Chinese Taipei				Israel; Romania; Greece; Croatia; Ranked 13th		
15th	Senegal				Israel; Romania; Greece; Croatia; Ranked 13th		
16th	Nigeria				Israel; Romania; Greece; Croatia; Ranked 13th		

== Qualified teams ==
The twelve teams that qualified for Beijing 2008 are:

- Australia
- Belarus
- Brazil
- China
- Czech Republic
- South Korea
- Latvia
- Mali
- New Zealand
- Russia
- Spain
- United States

The italicized teams are the wildcards.
