= Basketball at the 2019 Pacific Games – Women's tournament =

Basketball at the 2019 Pacific Games women's tournament
Tournament details
- Host country: Samoa
- Dates: July 8–16
- Teams: 8 (from 8 federations)
- Venue: 1 (in 1 host city)

Final positions
- Champions: American Samoa (1st title)

Tournament statistics
- Top scorer: (Samoa) Leaupepe (33.7)
- Top rebounds: (Papua New Guinea) Angula (18.3)
- Top assists: (Fiji) Nainima (4.6)
- PPG (Team): American Samoa (85.4)
- RPG (Team): Samoa (59.7)
- APG (Team): American Samoa (13.0)

Official website
- 2019 Pacific Games – Women's tournament

The Women's basketball tournament at the 2019 Pacific Games was held in Apia, Samoa from 8–16 July.

== Participating teams ==
Eight countries have qualified and are expected to compete in the women's basketball tournament:

- American Samoa
- Cook Islands
- Fiji
- Guam
- New Caledonia
- Papua New Guinea
- Samoa
- Tahiti

== Group stage ==
All times are local (UTC+13)

=== Group A ===
Pos	Team	Pld	W	L	PF	PA	PD	Pts	Qualification
1	Fiji	3	3	0	218	154	+64	6	Advance to the semi-final round
2	Samoa	3	2	1	222	196	+26	4	Advance to the quarter-final round
3	Cook Islands	3	1	2	225	179	+46	2	Advance to the quarter-final round
4	New Caledonia	3	0	3	141	277	−136	0	Advance to the classification round

First match(es) will be played: 8 July 2019. Source:
Rules for classification: a. points; b. win–loss record; c. goal average; d. head-to-head records; e. quotient system

8 July 2019
12:00

Report

Fiji	71–69	Cook Islands
Scoring by quarter: 18–10, 11–18, 23–17, 19–24

Faleata Sporting Complex, Apia

8 July 2019
18:45

Report

Samoa	106–64	New Caledonia
Scoring by quarter: 30–11, 21–19, 28–18, 27–16

Faleata Sporting Complex, Apia

10 July 2019
12:00

Report

New Caledonia	40–82	Fiji
Scoring by quarter: 10–18, 11–20, 3–22, 16–22

Faleata Sporting Complex, Apia

10 July 2019
18:45

Report

Cook Islands	67–71	Samoa
Scoring by quarter: 13–26, 17–12, 19–13, 18–20

Faleata Sporting Complex, Apia

12 July 2019
12:00

Report

New Caledonia	37–89	Cook Islands
Scoring by quarter: 10–25, 14–17, 8–20, 5–27

Faleata Sporting Complex, Apia

12 July 2019
18:45

Report

Samoa	45–65	Fiji
Scoring by quarter: 14–28, 7–10, 18–16, 6–11

Faleata Sporting Complex, Apia

=== Group B ===
Pos	Team	Pld	W	L	PF	PA	PD	Pts	Qualification
1	American Samoa	3	3	0	270	178	+92	6	Advance to the semi-final round
2	Guam	3	2	1	232	196	+36	4	Advance to the quarter-final round
3	Tahiti	3	1	2	155	254	−99	2	Advance to the quarter-final round
4	Papua New Guinea	3	0	3	194	223	−29	0	Advance to the classification round

First match(es) will be played: 9 July 2019. Source:
Rules for classification: a. points; b. win–loss record; c. goal average; d. head-to-head records; e. quotient system

9 July 2019
12:00

Report

Papua New Guinea	48–84	Guam
Scoring by quarter: 16–28, 4–26, 13–18, 15–12

Faleata Sporting Complex, Apia

9 July 2019
16:30

Report

American Samoa	85–61	Tahiti
Scoring by quarter: 24–11, 22–15, 20–18, 19–17

Faleata Sporting Complex, Apia

11 July 2019
12:00

Report

Tahiti	70–66	Papua New Guinea
Scoring by quarter: 10–21, 27–12, 14–18, 19–15

Faleata Sporting Complex, Apia

11 July 2019
16:30

Report

Guam	76–85	American Samoa
Scoring by quarter: 15–26, 16–21, 24–20, 21–18

Faleata Sporting Complex, Apia

13 July 2019
12:00

Report

Guam	72–63	Tahiti
Scoring by quarter: 18–5, 18–23, 19–16, 17–19

Faleata Sporting Complex, Apia

13 July 2019
16:30

Report

American Samoa	100–41	Papua New Guinea
Scoring by quarter: 27–11, 28–9, 23–11, 22–10

Faleata Sporting Complex, Apia

== Final round ==
Playoffs
15 July
Guam	67
Cook Islands	66
15 July
Samoa	84
Tahiti	70

Semi-finals
16 July
Fiji	87
Guam	51
16 July
American Samoa	83
Samoa	49

Final
17 July
Fiji	53
American Samoa	74
Bronze medal match
17 July
Guam	85
Samoa	87

=== Classification 7th-8th ===
15 July 2019
09:00

Report

New Caledonia	45–60	Papua New Guinea
Scoring by quarter: 5–15, 12–16, 16–13, 12–16

Faleata Sporting Complex, Apia

=== Playoffs ===
15 July 2019
15:00

Report

Samoa	84–70	Tahiti
Scoring by quarter: 25–16, 19–15, 23–18, 17–21

Faleata Sporting Complex, Apia

15 July 2019
17:00

Report

Guam	67–66	Cook Islands
Scoring by quarter: 13–19, 17–11, 16–22, 21–14

Faleata Sporting Complex, Apia

=== Classification 5th-6th ===
16 July 2019
09:00

Report

Tahiti	71–70	Cook Islands
Scoring by quarter: 15–9, 18–20, 14–17, 24–24

Faleata Sporting Complex, Apia

=== Semifinals ===
16 July 2019
13:00

Report

American Samoa	83–49	Samoa
Scoring by quarter: 24–8, 23–10, 20–15, 16–16

Faleata Sporting Complex, Apia

16 July 2019
17:00

Report

Fiji	87–51	Guam
Scoring by quarter: 31–2, 21–20, 21–22, 14–7

Faleata Sporting Complex, Apia

=== Bronze medal match ===
17 July 2019
11:00

Report

Samoa	87–85	Guam
Scoring by quarter: 24–16, 13–20, 15–21, 35–28

Faleata Sporting Complex, Apia

=== Final ===
17 July 2019
15:30

Report

American Samoa	74–53	Fiji
Scoring by quarter: 24–13, 6–15, 22–16, 22–9

Faleata Sporting Complex, Apia

== Final standings ==
Qualified for the 2019 FIBA Women's Asia Cup Division B

#	Team	Pld	W	L	PF	PA	PD	FIBA World Ranking		
#	Team	Pld	W	L	PF	PA	PD	Old	New	+/−
1st place, gold medalist(s)	American Samoa	5	5	0	427	280	+147	–		
2nd place, silver medalist(s)	Fiji	5	4	1	358	279	+79	74		
3rd place, bronze medalist(s)	Samoa	6	4	2	442	434	+8	–		
4th	Guam	6	3	3	435	436	–1	–		
5th	Tahiti	5	2	3	296	408	–112	–		
6th	Cook Islands	5	1	4	361	317	+44	–		
7th	Papua New Guinea	4	1	3	254	268	–14	–		
8th	New Caledonia	4	0	4	186	337	–151	–		
