= 2018 FIBA Polynesia Basketball Cup =

1st FIBA Polynesian Cup

Tournament details
- Host country: Samoa
- City: Apia
- Dates: 19−24 November
- Teams: 5 (from 1 sub-confederation)
- Venue: 1 (in 1 host city)

Final positions
- Champions: Tahiti (1st title)
- Runners-up: Samoa
- Third place: Tonga

Tournament statistics
- Games played: 12
- MVP: (French Polynesia) Ariirimarau Meuel
- Top scorer: (Tonga) Alipate (39.2)
- Top rebounds: (Tonga) Bain-Vete (13.2)
- Top assists: (French Polynesia) Teriitemataua (4.4)
- PPG (Team): Samoa (95.4)
- RPG (Team): Samoa (52.6)
- APG (Team): Tahiti (16.8)

Official website
- www.fiba.basketball/history

The 2018 FIBA Polynesia Basketball Cup was the inaugural edition of the FIBA Polynesian Cup, an international men's basketball tournament contested by national teams of the newly formed Polynesian sub-zone of FIBA Oceania. The tournament, along with the women's event, was played at the NUS Gymnasium in Apia, Samoa, from 19 to 24 November 2018.

The tournament also served as a qualifier for the men's basketball tournament of the 2019 Pacific Games in Samoa with three berths for Polynesia allocated for that event.

Tahiti swept its way throughout the tournament, sweeping the preliminaries and won their first-ever Polynesian Cup championship with the victory over the host Samoa in the final, 77–73. Both finalists, along with Tonga, who edged American Samoa in the bronze medal game, 79–77, earned the right to represent Polynesia in the men's basketball tournament of the 2019 Pacific Games, which was also held in Samoa.

== Teams ==
- American Samoa
- Cook Islands
- Samoa (Hosts)
- Tahiti
- Tonga

== Preliminary round ==
Pos	Team	Pld	W	L	PF	PA	PD	Pts	Qualification
1	Tahiti	4	4	0	374	259	+115	8	Final
2	Samoa (H)	4	3	1	404	310	+94	7	Final
3	American Samoa	4	2	2	266	359	−93	6	Third place game
4	Tonga	4	1	3	357	391	−34	5	Third place game
5	Cook Islands	4	0	4	266	348	−82	4	

Source: FIBA
Rules for classification: 1) Points; 2) Head-to-head results; 3) Points difference; 4) Points scored.
(H) Hosts

19 November 2018
13:00

Boxscore

American Samoa	72–67	Cook Islands
Scoring by quarter: 22–15, 11–18, 24–22, 15–12
Pts: Lyn. Siu 23; Rebs: Tovale 8 Asts: Lyn. Siu 4		Pts: Akania 20; Rebs: Heath 13; Asts: George 2

NUS Gymnasium, Apia

19 November 2018
17:00

Boxscore

Samoa	76–77	Tahiti
Scoring by quarter: 29–12, 11–20, 16–13, 20–32
Pts: Vaili 15; Rebs: McFarland 13; Asts: E. Tufuga, S. Tufuga 5		Pts: Meuel 31; Rebs: Teriitemataua 9 Asts: Teriitemataua 9

NUS Gymnasium, Apia

20 November 2018
15:00

Boxscore

Tonga	70–71	American Samoa
Scoring by quarter: 12–19, 11–20, 28–12, 19–20
Pts: Paea 23; Rebs: Bain-Vete 14; Asts: Alipate 5		Pts: Tovale 23; Rebs: Lyl. Siu 12; Asts: Lyn. Siu, Lyl. Siu 3

NUS Gymnasium, Apia

20 November 2018
19:00

Boxscore

Cook Islands	70–97	Samoa
Scoring by quarter: 22–29, 14–24, 15–15, 19–29
Pts: Heath 24; Rebs: Heath 9 Asts: Heath 6		Pts: S. Tufuga 32; Rebs: E. Tufuga 8 Asts: E. Tufuga, S. Tufuga 4

NUS Gymnasium, Apia

21 November 2018
17:00

Boxscore

Tahiti	102–80	Tonga
Scoring by quarter: 27–17, 31–18, 20–19, 24–26
Pts: Meuel 40; Rebs: Meuel 10; Asts: Meuel, Teriitemataua 5		Pts: Paea 30; Rebs: Bain-Vete 14; Asts: Alipate 5

NUS Gymnasium, Apia

21 November 2018
19:00

Boxscore

American Samoa	63–99	Samoa
Scoring by quarter: 13–31, 20–27, 15–20, 15–21
Pts: Tuimaseve 22; Rebs: Lyl. Siu 18; Asts: Lyn. Siu, Pa'Aga 2		Pts: Paia 22; Rebs: Paia 11; Asts: S. Tufuga 5

NUS Gymnasium, Apia

22 November 2018
13:00

Boxscore

Cook Islands	43–72	Tahiti
Scoring by quarter: 11–28, 19–8, 9–20, 4–16
Pts: Heath 14; Rebs: Heath 14; Asts: 4 players 2		Pts: Meuel 36; Rebs: Sommers 10; Asts: Sommers 6

NUS Gymnasium, Apia

22 November 2018
19:00

Boxscore

Samoa	132–100	Tonga
Scoring by quarter: 31–21, 27–27, 34–20, 40–32
Pts: McFarland 30; Rebs: McFarland 14; Asts: McFarland, E. Tufuga 6		Pts: Alipate 48; Rebs: Bain-Vete 11; Asts: Alipate 4

NUS Gymnasium, Apia

23 November 2018
15:00

Boxscore

Tonga	107–86	Cook Islands
Scoring by quarter: 24–30, 33–14, 31–18, 19–24
Pts: Alipate 55; Rebs: Bain-Vete 14; Asts: Paea 7		Pts: Akania 27; Rebs: Akania 11; Asts: Heath 5

NUS Gymnasium, Apia

23 November 2018
17:00

Boxscore

Tahiti	123–60	American Samoa
Scoring by quarter: 28–21, 27–10, 28–19, 40–10
Pts: Meuel 25; Rebs: Audouin 8 Asts: Audouin, Teriitemataua 4		Pts: Lyn. Siu 22; Rebs: Lyn. Siu 10; Asts: Nimoa'I 3

NUS Gymnasium, Apia

== Final round ==
=== Third place game ===
24 November 2018
15:00

Boxscore

American Samoa	77–79	Tonga
Scoring by quarter: 13–20, 23–13, 16–23, 25–23
Pts: Lyn. Siu 21; Rebs: Lyn. Siu 14; Asts: Lyl. Siu 2		Pts: Alipate 46; Rebs: Bain-Vete 13; Asts: Alipate, Bain-Vete, Paea 3

NUS Gymnasium, Apia

=== Final ===
24 November 2018
19:00

Boxscore

Tahiti	77–73	Samoa
Scoring by quarter: 14–20, 17–15, 27–11, 19–27
Pts: Meuel 23; Rebs: Sommers 9 Asts: Meuel 3		Pts: S. Tufuga 22; Rebs: McFarland 15; Asts: McFarland 4

NUS Gymnasium, Apia

== Final standings ==
Legend
Qualified for the 2019 Pacific Games
Qualified for the 2019 Pacific Games as hosts

Rank	Team	Record
1st place, gold medalist(s)	Tahiti	5–0
2nd place, silver medalist(s)	Samoa	3–2
3rd place, bronze medalist(s)	Tonga	2–3
4	American Samoa	2–3
5	Cook Islands	0–4

== Awards ==
2018 FIBA Polynesian champions

Tahiti
1st title

- Most Valuable Player: (French Polynesia) Ariirimarau Meuel
- All-Star Team:
  - PG – (Tonga) Marcus Alipate
  - SG – (Samoa) Sapeti Tufuga
  - SF – (French Polynesia) Ariirimarau Meuel
  - PF – (Samoa) Theodore McFarland
  - C – (French Polynesia) Reihiti Sommers

== See also ==
- 2017 FIBA Melanesia Basketball Cup
- 2018 FIBA Women's Polynesia Basketball Cup
- Basketball at the 2018 Micronesian Games
- Basketball at the 2019 Pacific Games
