= FIBA Polynesian Cup =

- Current season, competition or edition: 2022 FIBA Polynesian Cup
- Sport: Basketball
- Founded: 2018
- No. of teams: 5
- Country: FIBA Oceania member nations
- Continent: FIBA Oceania (Oceania)
- Most recent champion: Tahiti (2nd title)
- Most titles: Tahiti (2 titles)
- Website: www.fiba.basketball

FIBA Women's Polynesian Cup
- Current season, competition or edition: 2022 FIBA Women's Polynesian Cup
- Sport: Basketball
- Founded: 2018
- No. of teams: 5
- Country: FIBA Oceania member nations
- Continent: FIBA Oceania (Oceania)
- Most recent champion: Cook Islands (2nd title)
- Most titles: Cook Islands (2 titles)
- Website: www.fiba.basketball

The FIBA Polynesian Cup (FPC) is one of three new regional basketball tournaments organized by FIBA Oceania. The tournament was introduced in November 2018 for countries belonging to Polynesian sub-zone.

== Tournament format ==
The six teams will be split into two pools of three playing in a round robin format. The top two teams in each group will qualify for the semi-finals (with the two bottom teams playing off) or if there are five teams or less; one pool will play a round-robin with the top four teams qualifying for semi-finals. The top three teams from the FPC will qualify for the Pacific Games.

== Significance ==
According to FIBA in Oceania Executive Director David Crocker, one of the main reasons this tournament was created was to strengthen the level of competition within Oceania as well as the Pacific Games, ideally creating new national rivalries.

== Men's tournaments ==
=== Summary ===
Year	Host	Final			Third-place game		
Year	Host	Champion	Score	Second Place	Third Place	Score	Fourth Place
2018; Details	(Samoa); Apia	Tahiti	77–73	Samoa	Tonga	79–77	American Samoa
2022; Details	(Cook Islands); Kaitaia (New Zealand)	Tahiti	round-robin	Tonga	Samoa	round-robin	American Samoa

=== Medal table ===
Rank	Nation	Gold	Silver	Bronze	Total
1	Tahiti	2	0	0	2
2	Samoa	0	1	1	2
2	Tonga	0	1	1	2
Totals (3 entries)		2	2	2	6

=== Participating nations ===
Nation	(Samoa) 2018	(Cook Islands) 2022
American Samoa	4th	4th
Cook Islands	5th	5th
Samoa	2nd	3rd
Tahiti	1st	1st
Tonga	3rd	2nd
Total	5	5

== Women's tournaments ==
=== Summary ===
Year	Host	Final			Third-place game		
Year	Host	Champion	Score	Second Place	Third Place	Score	Fourth Place
2018; Details	(Samoa); Apia	Cook Islands	91–58	Tahiti	Samoa	70–53	American Samoa
2022; Details	(Cook Islands); Kaitaia (New Zealand)	Cook Islands	round-robin	Samoa	Tahiti	round-robin	American Samoa

=== Medal table ===
Rank	Nation	Gold	Silver	Bronze	Total
1	Cook Islands	2	0	0	2
2	Samoa	0	1	1	2
2	Tahiti	0	1	1	2
Totals (3 entries)		2	2	2	6

=== Participating nations ===
Nation	(Samoa) 2018	(Cook Islands) 2022
American Samoa	4th	4th
Cook Islands	1st	1st
Samoa	3rd	2nd
Tahiti	2nd	3rd
Tonga		5th
Total	4	5
