= SK Cēsis =

- Leagues: LSBL
- Founded: 1995
- Arena: Cēsu sporta komplekss
- Location: Cēsis, Latvia
- Team colors: Blue and White
- President: Krišjānis Kļaviņš
- Head coach: Armands Krauliņš
- Championships: 3 Latvian Championship: 2009, 2012, 2013
- Website: skcesis.lv

SK Cēsis is a professional women's basketball club based in Cēsis, Latvia. The team currently plays in Latvian Women's Basketball League. In 2008 the team attained second place in Baltic Women's Basketball League championships. In 2009 the team won Latvian championships and participated in FIBA women Eurocup competition where reached sixteenth-final. Latvian championships was won again in 2012 and 2013.

== Notable players ==
- (Latvia) Elīna Dikaioulaku
- (Latvia) Aija Klakocka
