= Mikaelar Whippy =

Fijian basketball player

Personal information
- Born: March 31, 1986 (age 40) Suva, Fiji
- Listed height: 1.73 m (5 ft 8 in)

Career information
- College: Long Island University, Brooklyn, NY

Career history

Coaching
- 2008–2010: LIU Director of basketball operations

Mikaelar Whippy (born March 31, 1986) is a female basketball player from Fiji who played for the Fiji women's national basketball team at the FIBA World Olympic Qualifying Tournament for Women 2008.

== Personal ==
She was born in Suva, Fiji on March 31, 1986. She attended the Church College of New Zealand, a secondary school in Temple View, Hamilton, New Zealand before pursuing a college basketball career in the U.S. at Long Island University. At LIU, she majored in economics with a minor in accounting. Upon her graduation in 2008, she assumed the role of director of operations for women's basketball at LIU for the following two seasons and earned her master's degree in human resource management in 2010.

== College career ==
At Long Island University, Whippy was a four-year starter and a two-year captain for the Blackbirds. Over her college career she averaged 8.2 points per game, totaling 952 points, 16th in school history. She pulled down 416 rebounds and is fifth all-time in assists with 285 total assists, averaging 2.5 per game. She sunk 40% of her 2-point shots and made 31% of her 3-point attempts.

=== LIU Brooklyn statistics ===
Legend
GP	Games played	GS	Games started	MPG	Minutes per game
FG%	Field goal percentage	3P%	3-point field goal percentage	FT%	Free throw percentage
RPG	Rebounds per game	APG	Assists per game	SPG	Steals per game
BPG	Blocks per game	PPG	Points per game	**Bold**	Career high

Year	Team	GP	Points	FG%	3P%	FT%	RPG	APG	SPG	BPG	PPG
2004-05	LIU Brooklyn	26	125	34.1%	26.7%	74.2%	2.6	1.3	1.1	0.0	4.8
2005-06	LIU Brooklyn	29	188	**47.8%**	**45.5%**	77.4%	3.0	1.6	1.0	**0.1**	6.5
2006-07	LIU Brooklyn	**31**	**394**	43.6%	34.1%	67.4%	**4.9**	**3.7**	**1.9**	0.1	**12.7**
2007-08	LIU Brooklyn	30	245	35.9%	22.1%	**77.8%**	3.7	3.0	1.0	-	8.2
Career		116	952	40.5%	31.2%	73.0%	3.6	2.5	1.2	0.0	8.2

== International career ==
In 2008, Whippy became a member of the Fiji National Team and participated in the FIBA Olympic Qualifying tournament.
