= Aija Klakocka =

Latvian basketball player

No. 13 – TTT Riga
- Position: Center
- League: LSBL

Personal information
- Born: 17 October 1986 (age 40) Riga, Soviet Union
- Listed height: 6 ft 4 in (1.93 m)
- Listed weight: 198 lb (90 kg)

Career information
- WNBA draft: 2008: undrafted

Career history
- 2013–2015: SK Cēsis
- 2018–present: TTT Riga

Aija Klakocka (née Brumermane, born 17 October 1986) is a Latvian women's basketball player with the Latvia women's national basketball team. She competed with the team at the 2008 Summer Olympics and EuroBasket Women 2009.
