= Taiʻarapu-Ouest =

Commune in French Polynesia, France

- Commune
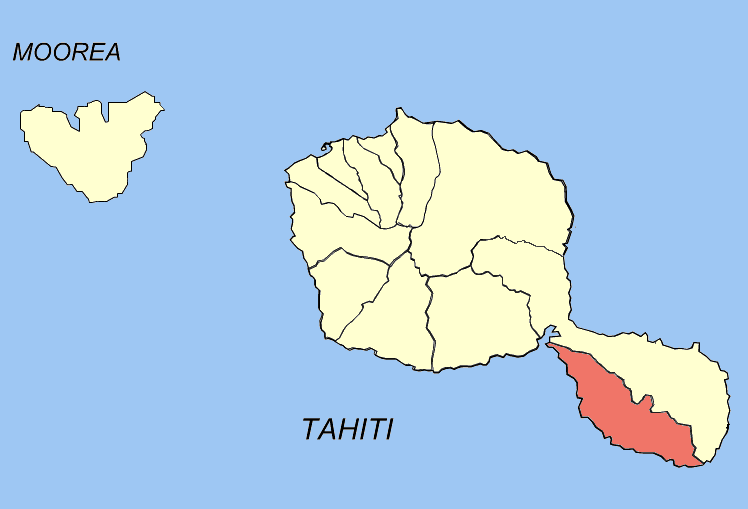
- Location of the commune (in red) within the Windward Islands
- Location of Taiʻarapu-Ouest
- Coordinates: 17°50′S 149°17′W
- Country: France
- Overseas collectivity: French Polynesia
- Subdivision: Windward Islands

Government
  - Mayor (2020–2026): Tetuanui Hamblin
- Area^{1}: 104.3 km^{2} (40.3 sq mi)
- Highest elevation: 1,306 m (4,285 ft)
- Lowest elevation: 0 m (0 ft)
- Population (2022): 8,371
  - Density: 80.26/km^{2} (207.9/sq mi)
- Time zone: UTC−10:00
- INSEE/Postal code: 98748 /98725
- ^{1} French Land Register data, which excludes lakes, ponds, glaciers > 1 km^{2} (0.386 sq mi or 247 acres) and river estuaries.

Taiʻarapu-Ouest (literally "Taiʻarapu West") is a commune of French Polynesia, an overseas territory of France in the Pacific Ocean. The commune of Taiʻarapu-Ouest is located on the island of Tahiti, in the administrative subdivision of the Windward Islands, themselves part of the Society Islands. At the 2022 census it had a population of 8,371.

The commune extends over half of the peninsula of Tahiti Iti ("small Tahiti", a.k.a. Taiʻarapu).

Taiʻarapu-Ouest consists of the following associated communes:

- Teahupo'o
- Toahotu
- Vairao

The administrative centre of the commune is the settlement of Vairao.

== Population ==
Historical population
Year	Pop.	±%
2002	6,081	—
2007	7,002	+15.1%
2012	7,639	+9.1%
2017	8,078	+5.7%
2022	8,371	+3.6%
