= Elīna Babkina =

Latvian basketball player

No. 7 – Ślęza Wrocław
- Position: Point guard
- League: BLK

Personal information
- Born: 24 April 1989 (age 37) Riga, Latvian SSR, Soviet Union
- Listed height: 5 ft 8 in (1.73 m)
- Listed weight: 143 lb (65 kg)

Career information
- WNBA draft: 2011: 3rd round, 29th overall pick
- Drafted by: Los Angeles Sparks
- Playing career: 2005–present

Career history
- 2004–2005: U-18 Latvija
- 2005–2008: TTT Riga
- 2008–2010: SK Cēsis
- 2010–2011: Lotos Gdynia
- 2011–2012: Fenerbahçe
- 2012: CSM Târgovişte
- 2013: USK Praha
- 2013–2014: Nadezhda Orenburg
- 2014–2018: CD CREF
- 2018–2022: Ślęza Wrocław
- 2022–2023: Elitzur Ramla

Career highlights
- 1× Israeli champion (2023)
- Stats at Basketball Reference

Elīna Babkina (born 24 April 1989) is a Latvian former basketball player.

Babkina was already offered a deal with Russian Superleague team UMMC Ekaterinburg at age 16. She was a member of TTT Riga until April 2008, when the team fired her. In September she signed a contract with SK Cēsis. Babkina played in the 2008 Summer Olympics.

She retired from professional basketball in April 2023 and became a player agent.

== Personal life ==
She attended Riga Jugla Secondary School as a child.

In 2011, rumors circulated among tabloid media, that Babkina had begun a relationship with the manager of the women's national team, Greek coach George Dikeoulakos. After playing in at least three clubs managed by him, George and Elīna married in July 2017 and changed her name to Elīna Dikaiulaku (or Elīna Dikeulaka, Elīna Dikaioulaku). They divorced in 2020, and she reverted to using her maiden name.

She was involved in a car crash on 24 November 2008. She was a passenger. Although she had worn her seat belt, she had a slight concussion.

== WNBA ==
Babkina was selected in the third round of the 2011 WNBA draft (29th overall) by the Los Angeles Sparks. Babkina signed with the Sparks on 19 February 2015.

== Achievements ==
- 2009 – FIBA Europe Under-20 Championship for Women Bronze medal with Latvia women's national basketball team in Poland.
- 2009 – 1st place in Latvian woman basketball league with SK Cesis.
- 2009 – 2nd place in Baltic woman basketball league with SK Cesis.
- 2008 – 9th place in Beijing Basketball at the Summer Olympics with Latvia women's national basketball team.
- 2008 – 4th place in FIBA "Diamond Ball" tournament in China.
- 2008 – Winner of Basketball at the 2008 Summer Olympics – Women's qualification.
- 2007 – 1st place in Latvian woman basketball league with TTT Riga and "Play-offs" MVP.
- 2005 – FIBA Europe Under-20 Championship for Women Bronze medal with Latvia women's national basketball team in Czech Republic.
