= María Revuelto =

Spanish basketball player

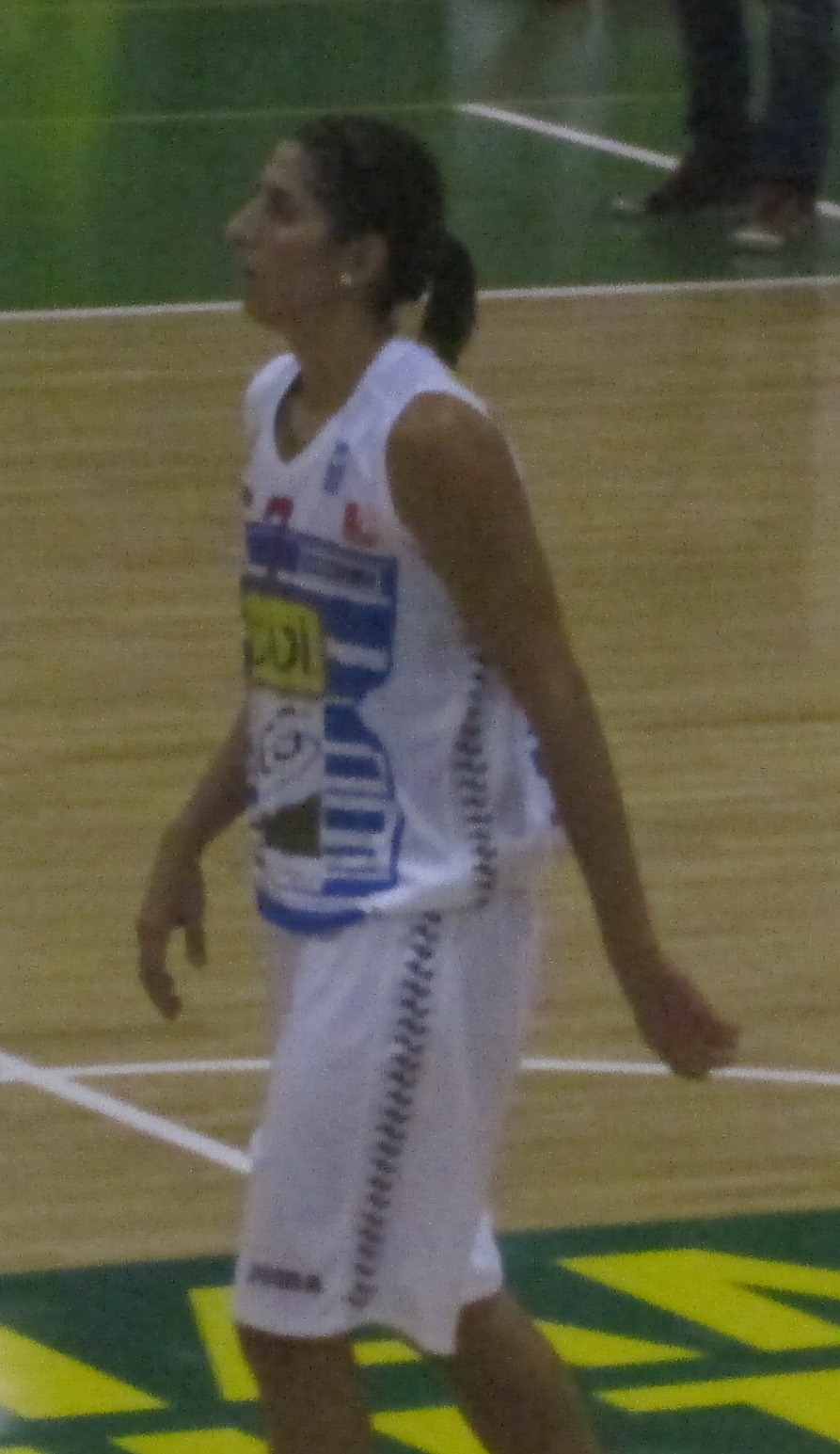
María Revuelto Sánchez-Aguilera

María Revuelto Sánchez-Aguilera (born 27 January 1982) is a Spanish basketball player who competed in the 2008 Summer Olympics.
