= LSBL Championships =

Annual Latvian women's basketball tournament

- Current season, competition or edition: 2025–26 LSBL Championships
- Sport: Basketball
- Founded: 1932 (initial); 1992 (current)
- First season: 1991-92
- No. of teams: 13
- Country: Latvia
- Continent: FIBA Europe (Europe)
- Most recent champion: TTT Rīga (25th title)
- Most titles: TTT Rīga (25)
- Level on pyramid: 1
- Relegation to: LSBL 2. divīzija (LSBL 2)

The LSBL Championships or the Optibet Latvian Women's Basketball League (Latvian: Optibet Latvijas Sieviešu basketbola līga) is an annual tournament for Latvian women's basketball teams in the Latvian Basketball League (LBL). First held in 1932, the current format of the league was established in 1992. Teams LSBL also compete in the Women's Baltic Basketball League divisions.

In January 2022, the league unveiled its two-year sponsorship with the Pullman international hotel chain at its Pullman Riga Old Town Hotel, with the league being named the Pullman Sieviešu Basketbola līga. In September 2024, a new sponsorship agreement was signed with the sports bar and betting company Optibet.

== History ==
The very first Latvian women's basketball tournament, fielding just three teams, took place in 1930; however, the first official Latvian Women's Basketball Championship (Latvian: Latvijas meistarsacīkstes basketbolā sievietēm) was organized by the Latvian Basketball Association in 1932, with the hastily formed Gongs/US-2 team defeating the powerhouse University of Latvia team Universitātes Sports (US) in the 1932/1933 season. From 1934 to 1940, joined by players from Gongs, US won seven straight championship titles. Universitātes Sports-dominated Latvian teams also won the 1933 Universiade women's basketball tournament in Turin.

When Latvia was occupied by the Soviet Union in 1940, the championship was suspended and US was dissolved. A Riga tournament, fielding seven teams, was held in 1941 with Dinamo-2 winning before the start of the German occupation of the Baltic states. In 1942, a Latvian league was established, featuring five clubs, with ASK (Army Sports Club) claiming the title. The next year, the league grew to eight teams - six from Riga and one each from Liepāja and Jelgava. The 1943/1944 season was the first to see champions outside Riga, with Liepājas SB ('Liepāja Sports Society') winning the title. However, the return of the frontline suspended the tournament in March 1944. After the return of the Soviet occupation, the top clubs began to play in the USSR Championships, with the most notable being the famous and titled TTT Rīga.

After the restoration of the independence of Latvia and a return to FIBA, the Latvian Women's Basketball League was launched in 1992. After the collapse of the Soviet league, TTT Rīga became its initial champions, claiming the top spot of the table, followed by BK Jūrmala. TTT has continued to dominate the league ever since, clashing with rivals like RTU and SK Cēsis.

Notable professional players who have played in the LSBL Championships tournament after 1992 include Anna DeForge, Māra Mote, Kitija Laksa, Marina Mabrey, and others.

== Current teams ==
2025/2026 season:

Team	Home arena	From
Daugavpils Universitāte (DU)	Daugavpils KSC	Daugavpils
Jaunatnes izlase ('Youth National Team') (Note: Players of the Latvian women's national under-17 basketball team and of other ages)	KSSH	Riga
SBK Liepāja/LSS	Liepāja Olympic Center	Liepāja
RSU	Rimi Olympic Centre	Riga
TTT Riga	Rimi Olympic Centre	Riga
TTT Rīga Juniores	RSS Rīdzene	Riga

== Champions ==
Year	Champions
2025	TTT Rīga
2024	TTT Rīga
2023	TTT Rīga
2022	TTT Rīga
2021	TTT Rīga
2020	TTT Rīga
2019	TTT Rīga
2018	TTT Rīga
2017	TTT Rīga
2016	TTT Rīga
2015	TTT Rīga
2014	TTT Rīga
2013	SK Cēsis
2012	SK Cēsis
2011	TTT Rīga
2010	TTT Rīga
2009	SK Cēsis
2008	TTT Rīga
2007	TTT Rīga
2006	Avantis/Turība
2005	TTT Rīga
2004	TTT Rīga
2003	TTT Rīga
2002	TTT Rīga
2001	TTT Rīga
2000	RTU/Klondaika
1999	TTT/Rapa
1998	RTU/Klondaika
1997	RTU/Klondaika
1996	RTU/EKJU/Arkādija
1995	TTT
1994	Arkādija/RTU
1993	TTT
1992	TTT
1941-1991: Occupation of the Baltic states
1940	Universitātes Sports
1939	Universitātes Sports
1938	Universitātes Sports
1937	Universitātes Sports
1936	Universitātes Sports
1935	Universitātes Sports
1934	Universitātes Sports
1933	Gongs/Universitātes Sports-2

== See also ==
- Latvia women's national basketball team
