= Cook Islands women's national basketball team =

Cook Islands
- FIBA ranking: 100 (8 August 2025)
- Joined FIBA: 1985
- FIBA zone: FIBA Oceania
- National federation: Cook Islands Basketball Association

The Cook Islands women's national basketball team represents the Cook Islands in international competitions.

They are a two-time FIBA Women's Polynesia Basketball Cup champions, winning it in 2018 and 2022. At the Pacific Games, Cook Islands won a silver medal in women's basketball in 2023 in Samoa.

The Cook Islands debuted at the FIBA Asia Women's Cup in Division B of the 2025 edition. FIBA Oceania members are able to compete in the Asian tournament since 2017.

With no established women's domestic league, Cook Islands players are based overseas especially Australia and New Zealand.

== Competitions ==
=== Asia Cup ===
The Cook Islands' Asian Cup Record
Year	Division A				Division B			
Year	Position	Pld	W	L	Position	Pld	W	L
1965–2015	Ineligible							
(India) 2017	Division B				Did not qualify			
(India) 2019	Division B				No Division B held			
(Jordan) 2021	Division B				Did not enter			
(Australia) 2023	Division B				Did not enter			
(China) 2025	TBD	Division B			7th place	4	1	3
(Philippines) 2027	To be determined							
Total		0	0	0		4	1	3

=== Pacific Games ===
The Cook Islands' Polynesia Cup Record
Year	Position	Pld	W	L
(New Caledonia) 2011	Did not enter			
(Papua New Guinea) 2015	Did not enter			
(Samoa) 2019	6th place	5	1	4
(Solomon Islands) 2023	2nd place	5	4	1
Total	1 silver	5–5 (incomplete)		

=== Polynesia Cup ===
The Cook Islands' Polynesia Cup Record
Year	Position	Pld	W	L
(Samoa) 2018	1st place	5	5	0
(Cook Islands) 2022	1st place	4	4	0
Total	2 golds	9–0		
