= Cook Islands men's national basketball team =

Cook Islands
- FIBA ranking: 149 ▼2 (1 September 2026)
- Joined FIBA: 1985; 41 years ago
- FIBA zone: FIBA Oceania
- National federation: Cook Islands Basketball Federation
- Coach: George Williams

Olympic Games
- Appearances: None

FIBA World Cup
- Appearances: None

FIBA Oceania Championship
- Appearances: None

South Pacific Games
- Appearances: 1
- Medals: None

FIBA Polynesian Basketball Cup
- Appearances: 1
- Medals: None
Home	Away	Third
Fourth	Fifth	Sixth

The Cook Islands national basketball team represents the Cook Islands in international basketball. It is administered by Cook Islands Basketball Federation and is a member of FIBA Oceania.

== Roster ==
At the 2018 FIBA Polynesia Basketball Cup:

Cook Islands men's national basketball team roster
Players
Coaches

Pos.	No.	Name	Age – Date of birth	Height	Club
F	0	Teokotai Akania	–	6 ft 4 in (1.93 m)
G	1	Alan Gempton	–	6 ft 0 in (1.83 m)
PG	5	Geosah George	–
	7	Robert Carr	–
F	8	Charlie Hosking	–	6 ft 4 in (1.93 m)
F	9	Brendan Heath	–	6 ft 4 in (1.93 m)
	10	George Peasse Williams	–
F	14	Ben Vakatini	–	6 ft 4 in (1.93 m)

Head coach

George Peasse Williams

Legend

- Club – describes last
  club before the tournament
- Age – describes age
  on 20 August 2015
