= Sonny Schmidt =

Samoan-New Zealand bodybuilder

- Professional bodybuilder

Personal info
- Born: September 19, 1953; New Zealand
- Died: January 25, 2004 (aged 50); Melbourne, Australia

Best statistics
- Biceps: 20-22 in (51-56 cm)
- Height: 5 ft 10 in (178 cm)
- Weight: 200–300 lb (91–136 kg)

Professional (Pro) career
- Best win: IFBB Masters Olympia; 1995

Sonny Schmidt (1953–2004) was a Samoan-New Zealand professional bodybuilder. He placed in many events between 1989 and 1999. The career highlight for Schmidt came when he won the 1995 IFBB Masters Olympia, becoming the first Pacific Islander and Samoan bodybuilding champion.

== Biography ==
Born Edmond Alten Schmidt on 9 September 1953 or 19 September 1953. Sonny grew up in Western Samoa. He later lived in Melbourne, Australia and travelled frequently to the United States for competitions.

Schmidt placed in many events between 1989 and 1999. The career highlight came when he won the 1995 IFBB Masters Olympia, becoming the first Pacific Islander and Samoan bodybuilding champion. Sonny was 5 ft 10 in (178 cm) and weighed 240-260 lb (109-118 kg).

He was arrested in 2000 on allegations that Schmidt assisted Lebanese-Australian drug lord, Tony Mokbel to import cocaine from Latin America into Australia. Sonny pleaded guilty to the charges and was sentenced to a period of three years imprisonment. Around this time Schmidt became a born-again Christian. He died on 25 January 2004 from cancer.
