= Toahotu =

To'ahotu
- Associated commune of Tai'arapu-Ouest
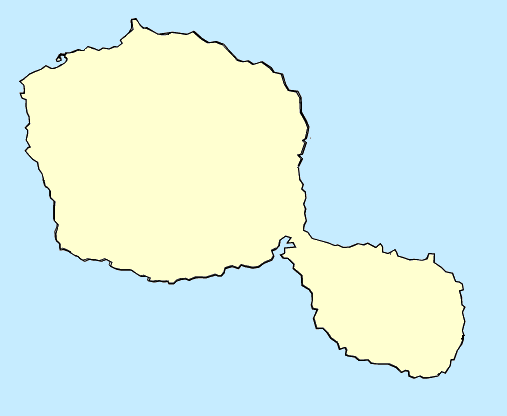
- Location within Tahiti
- Location of To'ahotu
- Coordinates: 17°48′5″S 149°17′38″W
- Country: France
- Overseas collectivity: French Polynesia
- Commune: Tai'arapu-Ouest
- Population (2022): 3,925
- Time zone: UTC−10:00

To'ahotu is an associated commune located in the commune of Tai'arapu-Ouest on the island of Tahiti, in French Polynesia.
