= Valerie Nainima =

Fijian basketball coach

Current position
- Title: Assistant head coach
- Team: Providence
- Conference: Big East Conference

Biographical details
- Born: June 29, 1986 (age 40); Rakiraki, Fiji
- Education: University of South Carolina

Coaching career (HC unless noted)
- 2014–2020: Fordham (asst.)
- 2021–2023: Michigan (asst.)
- 2023–present: Providence (asst.)
Medal record
Women's basketball
Representing Fiji
Pacific Games
Gold medal – first place	2007 Apia
Gold medal – first place	2015 Port Moresby
Silver medal – second place	2019 Apia
Pacific Mini Games
Gold medal – first place	2005 Koror

Valerie Nainima (born June 29, 1986) is a Fijian former basketball player and current assistant head coach for Providence. She is also a member of Fiji women's national basketball team.

== Playing career ==
Nainima began her college basketball career at LIU. During her freshman season she averaged 17.8 points, 4.1 rebounds, 2.3 assists, and 1.4 steals per game. Her 17.8 points per game was the highest scoring average of any freshman in the nation. She also ranked second in the conference in three-point percentage (.420) and third in both three-pointers made (2.07 per game) and free-throw percentage (.853). Following an outstanding season, she became the first player in the Northeast Conference history to win both Rookie of the Year and Player of the Year in the same season. She was also named to the NEC First Team All-Conference and the NEC All-Rookie Team. She won 10 NEC Rookie of the Week awards, setting the NEC record for the most Rookie of the Week honors in a season. During her sophomore season, she averaged 20.4 points per game. She became the fastest player in LIU history to reach 1,000 career points, reaching the milestone in 53 games.

When LIU head coach Stephanie Gaitley left to become the head coach at Monmouth, Nainima transferred to South Carolina. After sitting out a year as a transfer, Nainima made an immediate impact during her junior year with the Gamecocks and averaged 17.3 points per game, which ranked fifth in the Southeastern Conference and she was subsequently named to the All-SEC Second Team. On August 6, 2010, she underwent surgery to repair an ACL injury in her right knee. She began practicing with the team in December, four months after surgery. She made her season debut for the Gamecocks on December 12, 2010, where she recorded eight points, three assists and two steals in 12 minutes. She was subsequently named the AgSouth Athlete of the Week. She finished her career as one of the program's most prolific three-point shooters, ranking eighth with 115 career triples, and fourth in percentage (.338).

Following her collegiate career, Nainima played professionally overseas with New Basket Oberhausen in Germany for three seasons.

== Coaching career ==
=== Fordham ===
On January 16, 2015, Nainima was named video coordinator for Fordham. This reunited her with former LIU head coach Gaitley, who helped recruit Nainima. On June 14, 2017, she was promoted to assistant coach.

=== Michigan ===
On May 10, 2021, Nainima was named an assistant coach for Michigan.

=== Providence ===
On March 27, 2023, Nainima was named an assistant coach for Providence.

== National team career ==
Nainima has been a member of the Fiji women's national basketball team since she was seventeen. She represented Fiji at the 2005 South Pacific Mini Games, where she averaged 23 points, five rebounds, four steals, and three assists and won a gold medal. She again represented Fiji at the 2007 South Pacific Games, where she averaged 25.7 points per game and won a gold medal. She didn't compete at the 2011 Pacific Games due to playing for basketball overseas for New Basket Oberhausen in Germany. She represented Fiji at the 2015 Pacific Games and won a gold medal.

She was named to the roster for the 2017 FIBA Women's Asia Cup, however she was unable to make the trip to Lebanon. She represented Fiji at the 2019 Pacific Games where she averaged 16.4 points, 7 rebounds, and 4.6 assists per game and won a silver medal. Her 4.6 assists per game led all players in the tournament.
