= Fiji women's national basketball team =

International Women's Basketball Team

Fiji
- FIBA ranking: NR (18 March 2026)
- Joined FIBA: 1979
- FIBA zone: FIBA Oceania
- National federation: Basketball Fiji
- Coach: Laisiasa Puamau

FIBA Oceania Championship for Women
- Appearances: 1
- Medals: Bronze: 2007

Pacific Games
- Appearances: ?
- Medals: Gold: (4): 1983, 1987, 2007, 2015; Silver: (4): 1979, 1995, 1999, 2003; Bronze: (5): 1966, 1969, 1975, 1991, 2011
Home	Away

Fiji women's national basketball team is the national basketball team from Fiji, administered by the Fiji Amateur Basketball Federation. They played in the 2007 Oceania Championship in Dunedin.

== History ==
Due to their gold medal win at the 2015 Pacific Games, Fiji was given a berth at the 2017 FIBA Asia Cup. After the final match against American Samoa at the Pacific Games, Fiji did not play a competitive match until their FIBA Asia Cup debut.

At most Fiji could use eight players out of the twelve named for the 2017 FIBA Asia Cup, due to the unavailability of the four other players. Fiji finished sixth in the tournament.

== Team ==
=== Current roster ===
Roster for the 2017 FIBA Women's Asia Cup.

Fiji women's national basketball team roster
Players
Coaches

Pos.	No.	Name	Age – Date of birth	Height	Club	Ctr.
SG	4	Talica Vula Sauta	27 – 23 December 1989	1.58 m (5 ft 2 in)
SG	5	Seini Macrae Dobui	34 – 8 July 1983	1.58 m (5 ft 2 in)
PG	6	Tiyana Anne Kainamoli	19 – 27 June 1998	1.59 m (5 ft 3 in)
SG	7	Kelera Koyamainavure	21 – 22 June 1996	1.76 m (5 ft 9 in)
PF	8	Amalaini Raluvenitoga	25 – 13 October 1991	1.80 m (5 ft 11 in)
SG	9	Mereleni Dreke Tora	34 – 9 May 1983	1.79 m (5 ft 10 in)
C	10	Disiola Kaseva Boseiwaqa	22 – 9 March 1995	1.87 m (6 ft 2 in)
SG	11	Bitila Sigani Tawake	18 – 2 April 1999	1.57 m (5 ft 2 in)
SF	12	Dale Wise	36 – 4 July 1981	1.83 m (6 ft 0 in)
G	13	Valerie Nainima	31 – 29 June 1986	1.65 m (5 ft 5 in)
C	14	Leba Korovou	21 – 8 November 1995	1.87 m (6 ft 2 in)
F	15	Letava Whippy	26 – 24 March 1991	1.80 m (5 ft 11 in)

Head coach

- (Fiji) Laisiasa Puamau

Legend

- Club – describes last
  club before the tournament
- Age – describes age
  on 23 July 2017

=== Past rosters ===
At the FIBA World Olympic Qualifying Tournament for Women 2008:

- Letava Whippy
- Mikaelar Whippy
- Boulou Tuisou
- Valerie Nainima
- Brittany Hazelman
- Ofa Moce
- Seini Dobui
- Mareta Mani
- Alisi Tabulaevu
- Lusiani Robanakadavu
- Kelera Maitaika
- Vitorina Matila
- coach: Mike Whippy

2007:

- Agnes Sokosoko
- Batiri Hughes
- Brittany Hazelman
- Elenoa Naivalurua
- Kelera Mataika
- Leilani Saukawa
- Letava Whippy
- Mareta Mani
- Mickaelar Whippy
- Seini Dobui
- Sera Colata
- Valerie Nainima

== See also ==
- Fiji women's national under-19 basketball team
- Fiji women's national under-17 basketball team
- Fiji women's national 3x3 team
