= Tonga men's national basketball team =

Tonga
- FIBA ranking: 138 ▼2 (1 September 2026)
- Joined FIBA: 1987
- FIBA zone: FIBA Oceania
- National federation: Tonga National Basketball Association
- Coach: Will DeBerg

Oceanian Championship
- Appearances: None

Oceania Basketball Tournament
- Appearances: ≥1
- Medals: Silver: 1993
Home	Away

The Tonga national basketball team (Tongan: timi pasiketipolo fakafonua ʻa Tonga) is the team that represents Tonga in international basketball and is a member of FIBA Oceania.

== Competitions ==
=== Performance at FIBA Oceania Championship ===
yet to qualify

=== Performance at Oceania Basketball Tournament ===
- 1989 : ?
- 1993 : (silver)
- 1997 : ?
- 2001 : ?
- 2005 : ?
- 2009 : ?
- 2013 : (gold)

=== Performance at Pacific Games ===
- 2019 : 7th

== See also ==
- Tonga at the Olympics
