= 2008 FIBA World Olympic Qualifying Tournament for Women =

2008 FIBA World Olympic Qualifying Tournament
For Women

Tournament details
- Host country: Spain
- Dates: 9–15 June
- Teams: 12 (from 5 federations)
- Venue: 1 (in 1 host city)

Official website
- OQT Spain

The FIBA World Olympic Qualifying Tournament 2008 for women took place from June 9 to June 15, 2008. On December 9, 2007, FIBA announced that Spain would host the wildcard tournament.

Through this tournament, the final five qualifying berths for the 2008 Olympics women's basketball competition were captured by Spain, Belarus, Latvia, the Czech Republic, and Brazil. The 12 teams that competed in the 2008 FIBA World Olympic Qualifying Tournament were based on the finishes in each of FIBA’s five zone qualifying tournaments.

== Participating nations ==
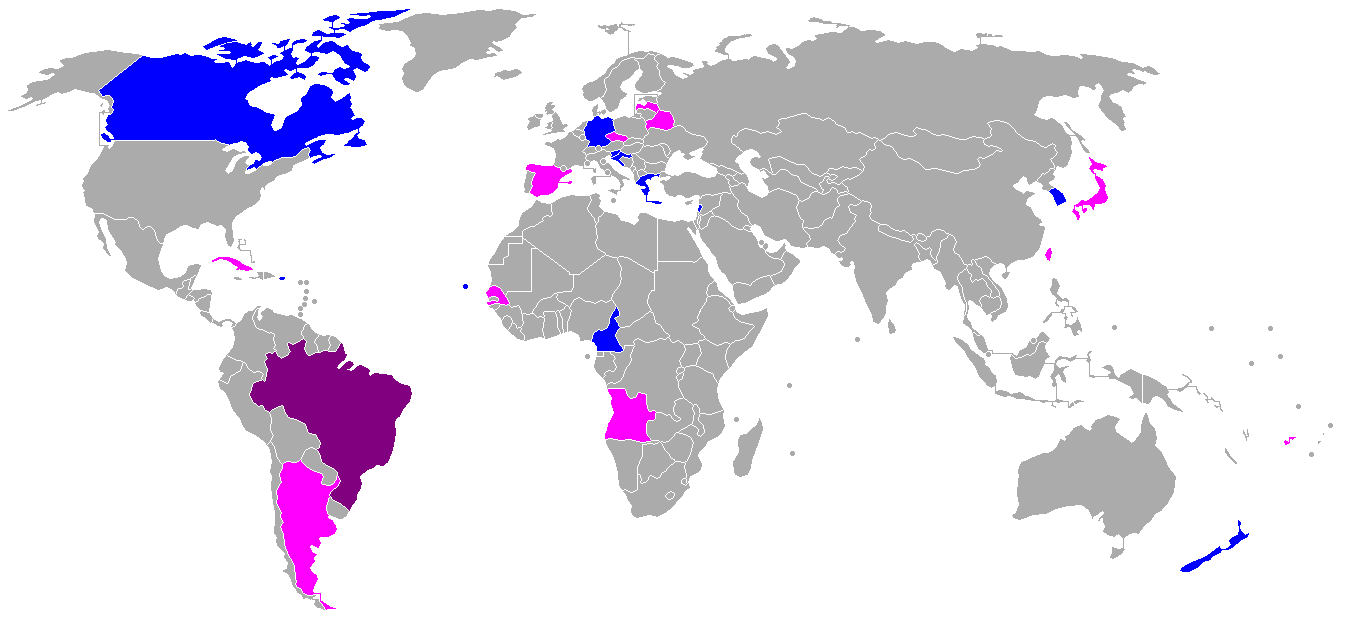
Participating countries in the wildcard tournaments. Men Men and women Women

The draw was made on January 14, 2008 in Institute of Training and Studies of the Central Government of Madrid.

The teams were divided into three pots, roughly corresponding to the FIBA World Rankings and to their continental zones (all European teams are in Pot 3):

Pot 1	Pot 2	Pot 3
22. Chinese Taipei; 17. Senegal; 42. Angola; 58. Fiji	8. Cuba; 4. Brazil; 12. Argentina; 15. Japan	5. Spain; 30. Belarus; 26.Latvia; 9. Czech Republic

== Format ==
The 12 participating teams were divided into four groups (A, B, C and D) of three teams each. Each team played all the other teams in its own group. The teams placed 1st and 2nd in each group played in the Quarter-Finals, with the four winners of the Quarter-Finals qualifying for the Olympic Games. The four losers played in the Semi-Finals and Finals for one remaining qualifying place.

== Preliminary round ==
Qualified for the quarterfinals

Times given below are in Central European Summer Time (UTC+2).

=== Group A ===
Team	Pts.	W	L	PCT	PF	PA	Diff
Latvia	4	2	0	1.000	177	103	+74
Japan	3	1	1	0.500	140	152	-12
Senegal	2	0	2	0.000	103	165	-62

June 9
17:45

Latvia	94–34	Senegal
Scoring by quarter: 29-5, 15-10, 28-11, 22-8

Madrid Arena, Madrid

June 10
15:00

Senegal	69–71	Japan
Scoring by quarter: 19-22, 8-17, 20-20, 22-12

Madrid Arena, Madrid

June 11
15:00

Japan	69–83	Latvia
Scoring by quarter: 19-20, 18-21, 24-17, 8-25

Madrid Arena, Madrid

=== Group B ===
Team	Pts.	W	L	PCT	PF	PA	Diff
Czech Republic	4	2	0	1.000	163	109	+54
Angola	3	1	1	0.500	113	144	-31
Argentina	2	0	2	0.000	113	136	-23

June 9
20:00

Czech Republic	77–55	Argentina
Scoring by quarter: 18-25, 20-10, 24-11, 15-9

Madrid Arena, Madrid

June 10
19:30

Argentina	58–59	Angola
Scoring by quarter: 17-7, 9-16, 11-15, 21-21

Madrid Arena, Madrid

June 11
19:30

Angola	54–86	Czech Republic
Scoring by quarter: 9-24, 21-14, 10-21, 14-27

Madrid Arena, Madrid

=== Group C ===
Team	Pts.	W	L	PCT	PF	PA	Diff
Brazil	4	2	0	1.000	196	113	+83
Spain	3	1	1	0.500	181	113	+68
Fiji	2	0	2	0.000	87	238	-151

June 9
12:45

Spain	113–42	Fiji
Scoring by quarter: 33-9, 27-3, 27-10, 26-20

Madrid Arena, Madrid

June 10
17:15

Fiji	45–125	Brazil
Scoring by quarter: 12-29, 12-31, 17-36, 4-29

Madrid Arena, Madrid

June 11
12:45

Brazil	71–68	Spain
Scoring by quarter: 23-24, 17-11, 13-14, 18-19

Madrid Arena, Madrid

=== Group D ===
Team	Pts.	W	L	PCT	PF	PA	Diff
Cuba	4	2	0	1.000	164	137	+27
Belarus	3	1	1	0.500	139	133	+6
Chinese Taipei	2	0	2	0.000	144	177	-33

June 9
15:30

Chinese Taipei	79–96	Cuba
Scoring by quarter: 21-19, 18-24, 16-21, 24-32

Madrid Arena, Madrid

June 10
12:45

Cuba	68–58	Belarus
Scoring by quarter: 14-13, 17-15, 20-12, 17-18

Madrid Arena, Madrid

June 11
17:15

Belarus	81–65	Chinese Taipei
Scoring by quarter: 13-14, 20-13, 20-15, 28-23

Madrid Arena, Madrid

== Knockout stage ==
Note: Italicized teams qualify for the Olympics.

Quarterfinals; June 13
A1	Latvia	84
B2	Angola	26
C1	Brazil	79
D2	Belarus (OT)	86
B1	Czech Republic	76
A2	Japan	64
D1	Cuba	68
C2	Spain	82

Semifinals (quarterfinal losers); June 14
B2	Angola	58
C1	Brazil	75
A2	Japan	58
D1	Cuba	66

Final game June 15
C1	Brazil	72
D1	Cuba	67

=== Quarterfinals ===
June 13
12:45

Cuba	68–82	Spain
Scoring by quarter: 17-16, 18-23, 15-20, 18-23

Madrid Arena, Madrid

June 13
15:00

Czech Republic	76–64	Japan
Scoring by quarter: 16-21, 11-5, 23-15, 26-23

Madrid Arena, Madrid

June 13
17:15

Latvia	84–26	Angola
Scoring by quarter: 23-9, 16-5, 23-6, 22-6

Madrid Arena, Madrid

June 13
19:30

Brazil	79–86 (OT)	Belarus
Scoring by quarter: 22-22, 6-13, 22-16, 22-21, Overtime: 7-14

Madrid Arena, Madrid

=== Semifinals ===
June 14
17:15

Cuba	66–58	Japan
Scoring by quarter: 21-18, 16-8, 16-17, 13-15

Madrid Arena, Madrid

June 14
19:30

Angola	58–75	Brazil
Scoring by quarter: 8-28, 12-15, 14-16, 24-16

Madrid Arena, Madrid

=== Final game ===
June 15
19:25

Cuba	67–72	Brazil
Scoring by quarter: 16-19, 18-15, 13-11, 20-27

Madrid Arena, Madrid
