= Tahiti women's national basketball team =

Tahiti
- FIBA ranking: 115 (8 August 2025)
- Joined FIBA: 1960
- FIBA zone: FIBA Oceania
- National federation: Fédération Tahitienne de Basketball

The Tahiti women's national basketball team represents Tahiti in international competitions. The team has won several gold medals at the Pacific Games, including at the inaugural women's tournament in 1966. It is managed by the Fédération Tahitienne de Basketball.

== See also ==
- Tahiti national basketball team (for men)

== Sources ==
- "Results Booklet" (PDF 0.9 MB). FIBA Oceania. 30 September 2011. Archived from the original on 11 October 2014.
- Krastev, Todor (2014). "Basketball National Teams Oceania Archive". Todor66. Archived from the original on 21 October 2014.
