= American Samoa women's national basketball team =

American Samoa
- FIBA ranking: NR (8 August 2025)
- Joined FIBA: 1976
- FIBA zone: FIBA Oceania
- National federation: American Samoa Basketball Association

FIBA Oceania Championship for Women
- Appearances: None

Pacific Games
- Medals: Gold: 2019; Silver: 2007, 2015

Pacific Mini Games
- Medals: Silver: 1997; Bronze: 1985
Home	Away

The American Samoa women's national basketball team is the national basketball team of American Samoa.

== See also ==
- American Samoa men's national basketball team
- American Samoa national under-19 basketball team
- American Samoa national under-17 basketball team
- American Samoa national 3x3 team
