= FIBA Melanesian Cup =

Basketball tournament

- Current season, competition or edition: 2025 FIBA Melanesian Basketball Cup
- Sport: Basketball
- Founded: 2017
- No. of teams: 5
- Country: FIBA Oceania member nations
- Continent: FIBA Oceania (Oceania)
- Most recent champions: Papua New Guinea (2nd title)
- Most titles: Papua New Guinea (2 titles)
- Website: www.fiba.basketball

FIBA Women's Melanesian Cup
- Current season, competition or edition: 2025 FIBA Women's Melanesian Basketball Cup
- Sport: Basketball
- Founded: 2017
- No. of teams: 5
- Country: FIBA Oceania member nations
- Continent: FIBA Oceania (Oceania)
- Most recent champion: Fiji (2nd title)
- Most titles: Fiji (2 titles)
- Website: www.fiba.basketball

The FIBA Melanesian Cup (FMC) is one of three new regional basketball tournaments organized by FIBA Oceania. The tournament was introduced in September 2017 for countries belonging to Melanesian sub-zone.

== Tournament format ==
The six teams will be split into two pools of three playing in a round robin format. The top two teams in each group will qualify for the semi-finals (with the two bottom teams playing off) or if there are five teams or less; one pool will play a round-robin with the top four teams qualifying for semi-finals. The top two teams from the FMC will qualify for the Pacific Games.

== Significance ==
According to FIBA in Oceania Executive Director David Crocker, one of the main reasons this tournament was created was to strengthen the level of competition within Oceania as well as the Pacific Games, ideally creating new national rivalries.

== Men's tournaments ==
=== Summary ===
Year	Host	Final			Bronze medal game		
Year	Host	Champions	Score	Second place	Third place	Score	Fourth place
2017; Details	(Papua New Guinea); Port Moresby	Papua New Guinea	81–63	New Caledonia	Fiji	63–43	Solomon Islands
2022; Details	(Fiji); Suva	New Caledonia	87–57	Papua New Guinea	Fiji	67–53	Solomon Islands
2025; Details	(Solomon Islands); Honiara	Papua New Guinea	68–61	Fiji	Solomon Islands	(Forfeit)	New Caledonia

=== Medal table ===
Rank	Nation	Gold	Silver	Bronze	Total
1	Papua New Guinea	2	1	0	3
2	New Caledonia	1	1	0	2
3	Fiji	0	1	2	3
4	Solomon Islands	0	0	1	1
Totals (4 entries)		3	3	3	9

=== Participating nations ===
Nation	(Papua New Guinea) 2017	(Fiji) 2022	(Solomon Islands) 2025
Fiji	3rd	3rd	2nd
Papua New Guinea	1st	2nd	1st
New Caledonia	2nd	1st	4th
Solomon Islands	4th	4th	3rd
Vanuatu	—	—	5th
Total	4	4	5

== Women's tournaments ==
=== Summary ===
Year	Host	Final			Bronze medal game		
Year	Host	Champions	Score	Second place	Third place	Score	Fourth place
2017; Details	(Papua New Guinea); Port Moresby	Papua New Guinea	77–58	Fiji	New Caledonia	60–49	Solomon Islands
2022; Details	(Fiji); Suva	Fiji	71–38	Papua New Guinea	New Caledonia	54–28	Solomon Islands
2025; Details	(Solomon Islands); Honiara	Fiji	57–44	Papua New Guinea	Solomon Islands	(Forfeit)	New Caledonia

=== Medal table ===
Rank	Nation	Gold	Silver	Bronze	Total
1	Fiji	2	1	0	3
2	Papua New Guinea	1	2	0	3
3	New Caledonia	0	0	2	2
4	Solomon Islands	0	0	1	1
Totals (4 entries)		3	3	3	9

=== Participating nations ===
Nation	(Papua New Guinea) 2017	(Fiji) 2022	(Fiji) 2025
Fiji	2nd	1st	1st
Papua New Guinea	1st	2nd	2nd
New Caledonia	3rd	3rd	4th
Solomon Islands	4th	4th	3rd
Vanuatu	—	—	5th
Total	4	4	5
