= Basketball at the 2023 Pacific Games – Men's tournament =

Tournament details
- Host country: Solomon Islands
- City: Honiara
- Dates: 17–25 November 2023
- Teams: 8 (from 1 confederation)
- Venue: 1 (in 1 host city)

Final positions
- Champions: Fiji (2nd title)
- Runners-up: Guam
- Third place: New Caledonia
- Fourth place: Samoa

Tournament statistics
- Games played: 20
- Top scorer: (Papua New Guinea) Apia Muri (21.6 ppg)

Official website
- 2023 Pacific Games

The men's basketball tournament at the 2023 Pacific Games was the 17th edition of the event for men at the Pacific Games. It was held from 17 to 25 November 2023. All games were played at the Friendship Hall in Honiara, Solomon Islands.

Fiji ended their 16-year title drought by upsetting the defending champions Guam in the championship match, 51–47, winning their only second gold medal in the Games' men's basketball tournament. Meanwhile, New Caledonia notches their overall fourth bronze medal after thrashing the defending bronze medallists Samoa in the battle for third place, 97–61.

As this tournament served as the official qualifier of the Oceania region for the FIBA Asia Cup Pre-Qualifiers, both finalists earned their slots to the 2029 FIBA Asia Cup qualification wherein they will be participating in the First Round, which will happen in 2026.

== Format ==
The eight teams were split into two groups of four teams, and a single round-robin was held within each group. The first-placed teams of each group advanced straight into the semifinals with the second- and third-placed teams playing a two match qualifying finals before advancing. After the preliminary round, the teams were matched according to their results with the playoffs featuring only six teams (top three of each group). From there on a knockout system was used.

== Schedule ==
The schedule of the tournament was as follows.

G	Group stage	Q	Qualifying finals	C	Classification	¼	Quarterfinals	½	Semifinals	F	Finals

Event↓/Date →	17th Fri	18th Sat	19th Sun	20th Mon	21st Tue	22nd Wed	23rd Thu	24th Fri	25th Sat
Men	G	G	G	G	G	Q	C	½	F

== Qualified teams ==
Qualification method	Date	Berths	Qualified teams
Host nation	11 May 2016	1	Solomon Islands
2022 FIBA Micronesian Cup	8−11 June 2022	1	Guam
2022 FIBA Melanesian Cup	26−29 October 2022	2	New Caledonia; Papua New Guinea
2022 FIBA Polynesian Cup	1−5 November 2022	2	(French Polynesia) Tahiti; Tonga
Wildcards	16 December 2022	2	Fiji; Samoa
Total		8	

== Group stage ==
=== Group A ===
Pos	Team	Pld	W	L	PF	PA	PD	Pts	Qualification
1	Guam	3	3	0	271	179	+92	6	Semifinals
2	Papua New Guinea	3	2	1	245	202	+43	5	Quarterfinals
3	Samoa	3	1	2	177	224	−47	4	Quarterfinals
4	Solomon Islands (H)	3	0	3	136	224	−88	3	7th place game

Source: FIBA
Rules for classification: 1. points, 2. HTH points, 3. HTH game-point difference, 4. HTH game-points scored, 5. game-point difference, 6. game-points scored, 7. FIBA World Ranking
(H) Hosts

17 November 2023
17:00

Report

Solomon Islands	49–56	Samoa
Scoring by quarter: 11–12, 11–19, 13–2, 14–23
Pts: Otasui 14; Rebs: Maelasi 12; Asts: Tango 3		Pts: Chong Nee 16; Rebs: D. Keil 13; Asts: V. Keil, Nickel 2

Friendship Hall, Honiara

18 November 2023
18:00

Report

Papua New Guinea	81–34	Solomon Islands
Scoring by quarter: 18–8, 23–4, 22–8, 18–14
Pts: A. Muri 21; Rebs: H. Elavo 8 Asts: P. Muri 4		Pts: A. Basia 8 Rebs: Masaea 7 Asts: Maelasi 2

Friendship Hall, Honiara
Referees: Calia Hanks (AUS), Timoci Matai Sailada (FIJ), Muaimalae Levale (SAM)

18 November 2023
20:15

Report

Samoa	49–88	Guam
Scoring by quarter: 7–22, 19–28, 12–19, 11–19
Pts: Thompson 9 Rebs: Thompson 6 Asts: 3 players 2		Pts: Johnson 20; Rebs: Johnson 11; Asts: 3 players 3

Friendship Hall, Honiara
Referees: Samuel Pan (NZL), Roman Michel, Heimiti Mairau

19 November 2023
09:00

Report

Guam	96–77	Papua New Guinea
Scoring by quarter: 23–20, 33–20, 22–17, 18–20
Pts: Simon 30; Rebs: Simon 11; Asts: Johnson 4		Pts: A. Muri 21; Rebs: Tetemo 9 Asts: Tetemo 4

Friendship Hall, Honiara

21 November 2023
09:00

Report

Papua New Guinea	87–72	Samoa
Scoring by quarter: 18–18, 19–19, 28–9, 22–26
Pts: M. Elavo, C. Muri 21; Rebs: H. Elavo 9 Asts: C. Muri 8		Pts: Nickel 16; Rebs: Tutagalevao 11; Asts: D. Keil 6

Friendship Hall, Honiara

21 November 2023
20:15

Report

Guam	87–53	Solomon Islands
Scoring by quarter: 16–7, 31–14, 29–19, 21–13
Pts: Aiken, Simon 22; Rebs: Johnson 12; Asts: Grape 3		Pts: Grantham, Maelasi 10; Rebs: Maelasi 14; Asts: Masaea, Toramo 2

Friendship Hall, Honiara

=== Group B ===
Pos	Team	Pld	W	L	PF	PA	PD	Pts	Qualification
1	Fiji	3	3	0	219	178	+41	6	Semifinals
2	Tahiti	3	1	2	166	187	−21	4 (Note: 1−1, +4 (beat Tonga, lost to New Caledonia))	Quarterfinals
3	New Caledonia	3	1	2	199	200	−1	4 (Note: 1−1, +1 (beat Tahiti, lost to Tonga))	Quarterfinals
4	Tonga	3	1	2	213	232	−19	4 (Note: 1−1, −5 (beat New Caledonia, lost to Tahiti))	7th place game

Source: FIBA
Rules for classification: 1. points, 2. HTH points, 3. HTH game-point difference, 4. HTH game-points scored, 5. game-point difference, 6. game-points scored, 7. FIBA World Ranking
Notes:

18 November 2023
09:00

Report

Fiji	70–45	Tahiti
Scoring by quarter: 19–9, 14–16, 16–10, 21–10
Pts: Mclennan, Fox 15; Rebs: Fox 11; Asts: Whippy, Lum Kon 3		Pts: Meuel 16; Rebs: Teriitemataua 6 Asts: Sommers 3

Friendship Hall, Honiara

18 November 2023
11:15

Report

New Caledonia	80–82	Tonga
Scoring by quarter: 23–19, 16–19, 24–17, 17–27
Pts: Chevrin 19; Rebs: Chevrin, Tetainanuari 7 Asts: Esneu 3		Pts: Foketi 22; Rebs: Alipate 7 Asts: Foketi 4

Friendship Hall, Honiara

20 November 2023
11:15

Report

Tahiti	50–53	New Caledonia
Scoring by quarter: 9–15, 12–8, 13–17, 16–13
Pts: Commings 16; Rebs: Liu 6 Asts: Teriitemataua 2		Pts: Tetainanuari 13; Rebs: Weber 12; Asts: Patche, Mitrail 2

Friendship Hall, Honiara

20 November 2023
18:00

Report

Fiji	81–67	Tonga
Scoring by quarter: 23–16, 19–20, 24–19, 15–12
Pts: Fox 24; Rebs: Fox 14; Asts: Lum Kon 6		Pts: Alipate 20; Rebs: Sinisa 13; Asts: 3 players 2

Friendship Hall, Honiara

21 November 2023
13:30

Report

Tonga	64–71	Tahiti
Scoring by quarter: 11–19, 20–11, 13–15, 20–26
Pts: Foketi 20; Rebs: Foketi 6 Asts: Paea 3		Pts: Commings 18; Rebs: Meuel, Commings 8 Asts: Teriitemataua 4

Friendship Hall, Honiara

21 November 2023
15:45

Report

New Caledonia	66–68	Fiji
Scoring by quarter: 15–22, 19–12, 18–15, 14–19
Pts: Adjouhgniope 12; Rebs: Weber 8 Asts: Esneu 3		Pts: Waqabaca 22; Rebs: Fox 11; Asts: Whippy 3

Friendship Hall, Honiara

== Playoffs ==
=== Brackets ===
Quarterfinals
22 November
Samoa	81
Tahiti	71
22 November
Papua New Guinea	78
New Caledonia	88

Semifinals
24 November
Guam	93
Samoa	65
24 November
Fiji	71
New Caledonia	60

Final
25 November
Guam	47
Fiji	51
3rd place game
25 November
Samoa	61
New Caledonia	97

5th place game
23 November
Papua New Guinea	84
Tahiti	77

7th place game
23 November
Solomon Islands	59
Tonga	83

=== Quarterfinals ===
22 November 2023
14:30

Report

Papua New Guinea	78–88	New Caledonia
Scoring by quarter: 18–20, 20–21, 19–26, 21–21
Pts: A. Muri 27; Rebs: A. Muri 9 Asts: C. Muri 5		Pts: Chevrin 12; Rebs: Tetainanuari 8 Asts: Mitrail, Tetainanuari 3

Friendship Hall, Honiara

22 November 2023
17:00

Report

Samoa	81–71	Tahiti
Scoring by quarter: 18–16, 22–26, 22–19, 19–10
Pts: Chong Nee 24; Rebs: Nickel 12; Asts: Nickel 7		Pts: Meuel 21; Rebs: Liu 11; Asts: Roopina, Liu 2

Friendship Hall, Honiara

=== 7th place game ===
23 November 2023
12:00

Report

Solomon Islands	59–83	Tonga
Scoring by quarter: 19–24, 11–18, 14–17, 15–24
Pts: Grantham 13; Rebs: B. Basia, Wong 7 Asts: 3 players 2		Pts: Foketi 26; Rebs: Foketi 13; Asts: Aziziyan 3

Friendship Hall, Honiara

=== 5th place game ===
23 November 2023
17:00

Report

Papua New Guinea	84–77	Tahiti
Scoring by quarter: 24–19, 12–21, 20–16, 28–21
Pts: A. Muri 25; Rebs: H. Elavo 17; Asts: C. Muri 7		Pts: Meuel 30; Rebs: 3 players 5 Asts: Teriitemataua 6

Friendship Hall, Honiara

=== Semifinals ===
24 November 2023
17:00

Report

Guam	93–65	Samoa
Scoring by quarter: 24–11, 22–18, 26–15, 21–21
Pts: White 20; Rebs: 3 players 7 Asts: Calvo 4		Pts: Chong Nee 24; Rebs: E. Keil 7 Asts: Leaupepe 5

Friendship Hall, Honiara

24 November 2023
19:30

Report

Fiji	71–60	New Caledonia
Scoring by quarter: 18–14, 18–13, 18–13, 17–20
Pts: Waqabaca 18; Rebs: Fox 11; Asts: Mclennan, Whippy 4		Pts: Weber 15; Rebs: Tetainanuari 10; Asts: Chevrin, Esneu 3

Friendship Hall, Honiara

=== 3rd place game ===
25 November 2023
11:30

Report

Samoa	61–97	New Caledonia
Scoring by quarter: 18–32, 10–16, 16–30, 17–19
Pts: Chong Nee 13; Rebs: Thompson 9 Asts: Chong Nee 2		Pts: Fenuafanote 18; Rebs: Mitrail 10; Asts: Tetainanuari 5

Friendship Hall, Honiara

=== Final ===
25 November 2023
16:30

Report

Guam	47–51	Fiji
Scoring by quarter: 17–21, 19–11, 9–15, 2–4
Pts: T. Wesley 16; Rebs: T. Wesley 9 Asts: T. Wesley 2		Pts: Waqabaca 17; Rebs: Fox 10; Asts: Waqabaca, Lum Kon 2

Friendship Hall, Honiara

== Final standings ==
Rank	Team	Record	Qualified to
1st place, gold medalist(s)	Fiji	5–0	First Round Pre-Qualifiers of 2029 FIBA Asia Cup qualification
2nd place, silver medalist(s)	Guam	4–1	First Round Pre-Qualifiers of 2029 FIBA Asia Cup qualification
3rd place, bronze medalist(s)	New Caledonia	3–3	
4	Samoa	2–4	
5	Papua New Guinea	3–2	
6	Tahiti	1–4	
7	Tonga	2–2	
8	Solomon Islands	0–4	

== Awards ==
The All Star Five has been named following the coCALusion of the tournament.

Position	Player
All Star Five	(Guam) Gabriel Simon
All Star Five	(Papua New Guinea) Apia Muri
All Star Five	(Fiji) Joshua Fox
All Star Five	(New Caledonia) Jean-Sébastien Chevrin
All Star Five	(Fiji) Filimone Waqabaca
