= 2017 FIBA Melanesia Basketball Cup =

1st edition of the FIBA Melanesian Basketball Cup

1st FIBA Melanesian Cup

Tournament details
- Host country: Papua New Guinea
- City: Port Moresby
- Dates: 27–30 September
- Teams: 4 (from 1 sub-confederation)
- Venue: 1 (in 1 host city)

Final positions
- Champions: Papua New Guinea (1st title)
- Runners-up: New Caledonia
- Third place: Fiji

Tournament statistics
- Top scorer: (New Caledonia) Sillant (10.7)
- Top rebounds: (Fiji) Whippy (5.7)
- Top assists: (Papua New Guinea) Li. Wright (2.3)
- PPG (Team): Papua New Guinea (55.3)
- RPG (Team): Papua New Guinea (30.0)
- APG (Team): Papua New Guinea (9.3)

Official website
- www.fiba.basketball/history

The 2017 FIBA Melanesia Basketball Cup was the inaugural edition of the FIBA Melanesian Cup, an international men's basketball tournament contested by national teams of the newly formed Melanesian sub-zone of FIBA Oceania. The men's tournament was played together alongside the women's event at the Taurama Aquatic and Indoor Centre in Port Moresby, Papua New Guinea, from 27 to 30 September 2017. Countdown was officially launched on 19 May 2017.

The tournament also served as the Melanesian qualifier for the men's basketball event of the 2019 Pacific Games in Samoa with three berths for Melanesia allocated for the top three teams of this tournament.

The hosts Papua New Guinea dominated the entire tournament winning all of their games, including the championship game against New Caledonia to win the maiden championship. Both finalists and the third-placer Fiji qualified for and represented the Melanesia Region at the basketball tournament of the 2019 Pacific Games.

== Participating teams ==
The following national teams participated in the tournament according to FIBA.

- Fiji
- New Caledonia
- Papua New Guinea (Hosts)
- Solomon Islands
- ~~Vanuatu~~ (withdrew)

All times are local (Papua New Guinea Standard Time; UTC+10).

== Preliminary round ==
Papua New Guinea dominated the preliminary round with an unbeaten record.

Pos	Team	Pld	W	L	PF	PA	PD	Pts	Qualification
1	Papua New Guinea (H)	3	3	0	249	166	+83	6	Final
2	New Caledonia	3	2	1	240	209	+31	5	Final
3	Fiji	3	1	2	189	207	−18	4	Third place game
4	Solomon Islands	3	0	3	140	236	−96	3	Third place game

Source: FIBA
Rules for classification: 1) Points; 2) Head-to-head results; 3) Points difference; 4) Points scored.
(H) Hosts

27 September 2017
17:00

Boxscore

Fiji	70–73	New Caledonia
Scoring by quarter: 23–18, 21–22, 10–11, 16–22
Pts: Whippy 27; Rebs: Whippy 17; Asts: Whippy 2		Pts: Sillant 18; Rebs: Sillant 6 Asts: Delaunay-Belleville 1

Taurama Aquatic and Indoor Centre, Port Moresby

27 September 2017
19:00

Boxscore

Papua New Guinea	79–37	Solomon Islands
Scoring by quarter: 14–12, 22–5, 23–13, 20–7
Pts: Kala 15; Rebs: Wright 8 Asts: Wright 6		Pts: Gwali 9 Rebs: Masaea 8 Asts: Basia, Masaea 2

Taurama Aquatic and Indoor Centre, Port Moresby

28 September 2017
17:00

Boxscore

Solomon Islands	51–70	Fiji
Scoring by quarter: 17–19, 10–26, 17–6, 10–17
Pts: Gwali 9 Rebs: Masaea 8 Asts: Masaea 2		Pts: Whippy 27; Rebs: Whippy 17; Asts: Whippy 2

Taurama Aquatic and Indoor Centre, Port Moresby

28 September 2017
19:00

Boxscore

New Caledonia	80–87	Papua New Guinea
Scoring by quarter: 18–18, 19–20, 14–25, 29–24
Pts: Chevrin 17; Rebs: Weber 5 Asts: Weber 1		Pts: Farmer 20; Rebs: Apiko 10; Asts: A. Muri 3

Taurama Aquatic and Indoor Centre, Port Moresby

29 September 2017
17:00

Boxscore

Solomon Islands	52–87	New Caledonia
Scoring by quarter: 8–36, 15–19, 21–12, 8–20
Pts: Masaea 11; Rebs: Masaea; Asts: Masaea		Pts: Sillant 23; Rebs: Chevrin; Asts: Chevrin

Taurama Aquatic and Indoor Centre, Port Moresby

29 September 2017
19:00

Boxscore

Papua New Guinea	83–49	Fiji
Scoring by quarter: 14–11, 23–13, 26–13, 20–12
Pts: Wright 15; Rebs: Banduru; Asts: Banduru		Pts: Whippy 16; Rebs: Whippy; Asts: Whippy

Taurama Aquatic and Indoor Centre, Port Moresby

== Final round ==
=== Bronze medal match ===
30 September 2017
15:00

Boxscore

Fiji	63–43	Solomon Islands
Scoring by quarter: 17–12, 17–10, 14–11, 15–10

Taurama Aquatic and Indoor Centre, Port Moresby

=== Gold medal match ===
30 September 2017
19:00

Boxscore

Papua New Guinea	81–63	New Caledonia
Scoring by quarter: 17–18, 21–9, 26–19, 17–17

Taurama Aquatic and Indoor Centre, Port Moresby

== Final standings ==
Rank	Team	Record
1st place, gold medalist(s)	Papua New Guinea	4–0
2nd place, silver medalist(s)	New Caledonia	2–2
3rd place, bronze medalist(s)	Fiji	2–2
4	Solomon Islands	0–4

Qualified for the 2019 Pacific Games

== Awards ==
2017 FIBA Melanesian champions

Papua New Guinea
1st title

- All-Star Team:
  - (New Caledonia) Joan Delaunay-Belleville
  - (Papua New Guinea) Apia Muri
  - (Fiji) Marques Whippy
  - (Papua New Guinea) Matineng-Iakah Leahy
  - (Solomon Islands) Alex Chester

== See also ==
- 2017 FIBA Women's Melanesia Basketball Cup
- 2018 FIBA Polynesia Basketball Cup
- Basketball at the 2018 Micronesian Games
- Basketball at the 2019 Pacific Games
