= 2025 FIBA Melanesian Cup =

3rd FIBA Melanesian Cup

Tournament details
- Host country: Solomon Islands
- City: Honiara
- Dates: 13−18 October
- Teams: 5 (from 1 sub-confederation)
- Venue: 1 (in 1 host city)

Final positions
- Champions: Papua New Guinea (2nd title)
- Runners-up: Fiji
- Third place: Solomon Islands

Official website
- www.fiba.basketball

The 2025 FIBA Melanesian Cup was the third edition of the FIBA Melanesian Cup, an international men's basketball tournament contested by national teams of Melanesian sub-zone of FIBA Oceania. It was played in Honiara, Solomon Islands, from 13 to 18 October 2025. This tournament also served as a sub-regional qualification for the men's basketball event of the 2027 Pacific Games in Tahiti. Papua New Guinea became Melanesian basketball champions for the second time, after defeating Fiji in the final, 68–61.

== Participating teams ==
- Fiji
- New Caledonia
- Papua New Guinea
- Solomon Islands
- Vanuatu

== Format ==
In the group phase, the all five participating teams played round-robin in one group. The top two teams from this group advanced to the final; the third and fourth teams advanced to the third place match.

All times are local (Solomon Islands Time; UTC+11).

== Group phase ==
Pos	Team	Pld	W	L	PF	PA	PD	Pts	Qualification
1	Papua New Guinea	4	4	0	317	225	+92	8	Final
2	Fiji	4	2	2	309	247	+62	6	Final
3	New Caledonia	4	2	2	265	238	+27	6	Third place match
4	Solomon Islands (H)	4	2	2	276	261	+15	6	Third place match
5	Vanuatu	4	0	4	207	403	−196	4	

Source: FIBA
Rules for classification: 1) Points; 2) Head-to-head results; 3) Points difference; 4) Points scored.
(H) Hosts

13 October 2025
13:30

Boxscore

Papua New Guinea	99–39	Vanuatu
Scoring by quarter: 21–10, 27–11, 27–7, 24–11

The Friendship Hall, Honiara

13 October 2025
18:30

Boxscore

Solomon Islands	70–67	Fiji
Scoring by quarter: 22–25, 18–10, 16–14, 14–18

The Friendship Hall, Honiara

14 October 2025
11:00

Boxscore

Fiji	56–63	Papua New Guinea
Scoring by quarter: 17–11, 20–13, 7–18, 12–21

The Friendship Hall, Honiara

14 October 2025
16:00

Boxscore

New Caledonia	58–49	Solomon Islands
Scoring by quarter: 23–15, 9–9, 14–13, 12–12

The Friendship Hall, Honiara

15 October 2025
11:00

Boxscore

Vanuatu	61–123	Fiji
Scoring by quarter: 11–38, 19–24, 16–25, 15–36

The Friendship Hall, Honiara

15 October 2025
13:30

Boxscore

Papua New Guinea	77–74	New Caledonia
Scoring by quarter: 20–22, 13–12, 21–29, 23–11

The Friendship Hall, Honiara

16 October 2025
11:00

Boxscore

New Caledonia	80–49	Vanuatu
Scoring by quarter: 22–13, 14–5, 24–17, 20–14

The Friendship Hall, Honiara

16 October 2025
18:30

Boxscore

Solomon Islands	56–78	Papua New Guinea
Scoring by quarter: 13–14, 10–20, 19–28, 14–16

The Friendship Hall, Honiara

17 October 2025
13:30

Boxscore

Fiji	63–53	New Caledonia
Scoring by quarter: 19–7, 6–14, 20–12, 18–20

The Friendship Hall, Honiara

17 October 2025
16:00

Boxscore

Vanuatu	58–101	Solomon Islands
Scoring by quarter: 11–26, 17–19, 24–31, 6–25

The Friendship Hall, Honiara

== Third place match ==
18 October 2025

New Caledonia	0–20 (Forfeit)	Solomon Islands

Note: The New Caledonia Basketball Federation has withdrawn from the bronze medal matches against the Solomon Islands in both the men's and women's divisions. The decision comes as a result of travel arrangements and flight changes beyond their control. As a result, both bronze medal matches have been forfeited in favour of the Solomon Islands.

== Final ==
18 October 2025
18:30

Boxscore

Papua New Guinea	68–61	Fiji
Scoring by quarter: 16–13, 18–24, 16–10, 18–14

The Friendship Hall, Honiara

== Final standings ==
Rank	Team	Record
1st place, gold medalist(s)	Papua New Guinea	5–0
2nd place, silver medalist(s)	Fiji	2–3
3rd place, bronze medalist(s)	Solomon Islands	3–2
4	New Caledonia	2–3
5	Vanuatu	0–4

Qualified for the 2027 Pacific Games

== See also ==
- 2025 FIBA Women's Melanesian Cup
