= 2022 FIBA Melanesian Cup =

2nd FIBA Melanesian Cup

Tournament details
- Host country: Fiji
- City: Suva
- Dates: 26−29 October
- Teams: 4 (from 1 sub-confederation)
- Venue: 1 (in 1 host city)

Final positions
- Champions: New Caledonia (1st title)
- Runners-up: Papua New Guinea
- Third place: Fiji

Tournament statistics
- Top scorer: (Papua New Guinea) P. Muri (14.5)
- Top rebounds: (Fiji) Fox (12.3)
- Top assists: (New Caledonia) Delaunay-Belleville (4.0)
- PPG (Team): New Caledonia (78.8)
- RPG (Team): New Caledonia (46.8)
- APG (Team): New Caledonia (14.0)

Official website
- www.fiba.basketball/history

The 2022 FIBA Melanesian Cup was the second edition of the FIBA Melanesian Cup, an international men's basketball tournament contested by national teams of the Melanesian sub-zone of FIBA Oceania. The tournament was played at the Vodafone Arena in Suva, Fiji. Originally slated to be held in 2021, the schedule was pushed further to April 2022 due to COVID-19 pandemic, with exact dates has been set to 26–29 October 2022.

The competition served as the sub-regional qualification phase for the basketball event of the 2023 Pacific Games in Solomon Islands with two berths allocated in this tournament, which serves as the official qualifier to the FIBA Asia Cup Pre-Qualifiers.

New Caledonia thrashed the defending champions Papua New Guinea in the championship, 87–57, to notch their maiden title. Both finalists earned the right to represent Melanesia in the men's basketball tournament of the 2023 Pacific Games, along with hosts Solomon Islands.

== Participating teams ==
The following national teams participated in the competition.

- Fiji (Host)
- New Caledonia
- Papua New Guinea
- Solomon Islands

All times are local (Fiji Time; UTC+12).

== Preliminary round ==
Pos	Team	Pld	W	L	PF	PA	PD	Pts	Qualification
1	Papua New Guinea	3	2	1	213	207	+6	5	Final
2	New Caledonia	3	2	1	228	175	+53	5	Final
3	Fiji (H)	3	1	2	192	194	−2	4	Third place game
4	Solomon Islands	3	1	2	172	229	−57	4	Third place game

Source: FIBA
Rules for classification: 1) Points; 2) Head-to-head results; 3) Points difference; 4) Points scored.
(H) Hosts

26 October 2022
14:30

Boxscore

Papua New Guinea	65–77	Solomon Islands
Scoring by quarter: 11–14, 24–23, 11–11, 19–29
Pts: C. Muri 13; Rebs: Ivano 7 Asts: C. Muri 2		Pts: Grantham 23; Rebs: A. Basia, Tauneri Limanikuki 8 Asts: A. Basia 5

Vodafone Arena, Suva

26 October 2022
19:30

Boxscore

Fiji	62–64	New Caledonia
Scoring by quarter: 9–12, 15–24, 19–11, 19–17
Pts: M. Koyamainavure 23; Rebs: Fox 20; Asts: Fox 3		Pts: Weber 17; Rebs: Weber 9 Asts: Delaunay-Belleville 3

Vodafone Arena, Suva

27 October 2022
14:30

Boxscore

New Caledonia	66–75	Papua New Guinea
Scoring by quarter: 12–13, 18–21, 22–19, 14–22
Pts: Delaunay-Belleville 17; Rebs: Sillant 10; Asts: Sillant 5		Pts: A. Muri 19; Rebs: A. Muri 13; Asts: four players 2

Vodafone Arena, Suva

27 October 2022
17:00

Boxscore

Solomon Islands	57–66	Fiji
Scoring by quarter: 13–20, 18–18, 9–11, 17–17
Pts: Tauneri Limanikuki, Maelasi 12; Rebs: three players 7 Asts: Grantham 3		Pts: Waqabaca 26; Rebs: Fox 9 Asts: Naivalurua 2

Vodafone Arena, Suva

28 October 2022
12:00

Boxscore

New Caledonia	98–38	Solomon Islands
Scoring by quarter: 37–12, 24–7, 16–8, 21–11
Pts: E. Fenuafanote 21; Rebs: Weber, Tetuanui 7 Asts: Delaunay-Belleville 5		Pts: Grantham 11; Rebs: A. Basia 7 Asts: A. Basia 4

Vodafone Arena, Suva

28 October 2022
19:30

Boxscore

Fiji	64–73	Papua New Guinea
Scoring by quarter: 19–12, 17–20, 12–21, 16–20
Pts: Fox 14; Rebs: Waqabaca 10; Asts: Waqabaca 6		Pts: C. Muri 22; Rebs: C. Muri 8 Asts: A. Muri 2

Vodafone Arena, Suva

== Final round ==
=== Bronze medal match ===
29 October 2022
14:30

Boxscore

Fiji	67–53	Solomon Islands
Scoring by quarter: 15–8, 23–12, 11–19, 18–14
Pts: Koroi 22; Rebs: Fox 11; Asts: Waqabaca, M. Koyamainavure 4		Pts: Masaea 13; Rebs: Tauneri Limanikuki 8 Asts: six players 1

Vodafone Arena, Suva

=== Gold medal match ===
29 October 2022
19:30

Boxscore

Papua New Guinea	57–87	New Caledonia
Scoring by quarter: 7–23, 15–24, 11–18, 24–22
Pts: P. Muri, A. Muri 14; Rebs: A. Muri 7 Asts: P. Muri 3		Pts: Delaunay-Belleville 17; Rebs: Subiranas 10; Asts: Delaunay-Belleville, Weber 4

Vodafone Arena, Suva

== Final standings ==
Rank	Team	Record
1st place, gold medalist(s)	New Caledonia	3–1
2nd place, silver medalist(s)	Papua New Guinea	2–2
3rd place, bronze medalist(s)	Fiji	2–2
4	Solomon Islands	1–3

Qualified for the 2023 Pacific Games
Qualified for the 2023 Pacific Games as hosts

== Awards ==
2022 FIBA Melanesian champions

New Caledonia
1st title

- All-Star Team:
  - (Solomon Islands) Max Grantham
  - (New Caledonia) Jo Delaunay-Belleville
  - (Papua New Guinea) Apia Muri
  - (Fiji) Joshua Fox
  - (New Caledonia) Raymond Weber
