= 2025 FIBA Women's Melanesian Cup =

3rd FIBA Women's Melanesian Cup

Tournament details
- Host country: Solomon Islands
- City: Honiara
- Dates: 13−18 October
- Teams: 5 (from 1 sub-confederation)
- Venue: 1 (in 1 host city)

Final positions
- Champions: Fiji (2nd title)
- Runners-up: Papua New Guinea
- Third place: Solomon Islands

Official website
- www.fiba.basketball

The 2025 FIBA Women's Melanesian Cup was the third edition of the FIBA Melanesian Cup, an international women's basketball tournament contested by national teams of Melanesian sub-zone of FIBA Oceania. It was played in Honiara, Solomon Islands, from 13 to 18 October 2025. This tournament also served as a sub-regional qualification for the women's basketball event of the 2027 Pacific Games in Tahiti. Fiji successfully defended their title from the previous championship, after defeating Papua New Guinea in the final, 57–44.

== Participating teams ==
- Fiji
- New Caledonia
- Papua New Guinea
- Solomon Islands
- Vanuatu

== Format ==
In the group phase, the all five participating teams played round-robin in one group. The top two teams from this group advanced to the final; the third and fourth teams advanced to the third place match.

All times are local (Solomon Islands Time; UTC+11).

== Group phase ==
Pos	Team	Pld	W	L	PF	PA	PD	Pts	Qualification
1	Papua New Guinea	4	4	0	276	166	+110	8	Final
2	Fiji	4	3	1	260	177	+83	7	Final
3	New Caledonia	4	2	2	245	209	+36	6	Third place match
4	Solomon Islands (H)	4	1	3	147	225	−78	5	Third place match
5	Vanuatu	4	0	4	158	309	−151	4	

Source: FIBA
Rules for classification: 1) Points; 2) Head-to-head results; 3) Points difference; 4) Points scored.
(H) Hosts

13 October 2025
11:00

Boxscore

Papua New Guinea	82–36	Vanuatu
Scoring by quarter: 13–11, 17–9, 26–9, 26–7
Pts: Wong 15; Rebs: Asiba 15; Asts: Angula 7		Pts: Kasten 13; Rebs: Edgell 6 Asts: Taivakalo 2

The Friendship Hall, Honiara
Attendance: 100

13 October 2025
16:00

Boxscore

Solomon Islands	30–63	New Caledonia
Scoring by quarter: 3–22, 9–18, 10–14, 8–9
Pts: B. Basia 12; Rebs: Wanefai 9 Asts: Sade 4		Pts: Tchung 14; Rebs: Tui 9 Asts: Souque, Tui 3

The Friendship Hall, Honiara
Attendance: 450

14 October 2025
13:30

Boxscore

New Caledonia	70–76 (OT)	Papua New Guinea
Scoring by quarter: 20–12, 14–21, 11–17, 20–15, Overtime: 5–11
Pts: Souque 21; Rebs: Konhu 12; Asts: Souque 5		Pts: Wong 15; Rebs: Tongia 15; Asts: Angula 4

The Friendship Hall, Honiara
Attendance: 200

14 October 2025
18:30

Boxscore

Fiji	60–34	Solomon Islands
Scoring by quarter: 15–5, 4–13, 23–13, 18–3
Pts: Savu; Rebs: five players 6 Asts: Tuisue 6		Pts: Sade 13; Rebs: B. Basia 9 Asts: three players 3

The Friendship Hall, Honiara
Attendance: 350

15 October 2025
16:00

Boxscore

Vanuatu	43–64	New Caledonia
Scoring by quarter: 7–20, 9–12, 6–18, 21–14
Pts: Kasten 19; Rebs: Kasten 9 Asts: Java 4		Pts: Ha Ho 14; Rebs: M. Tetuanui 7 Asts: Ha Ho 5

The Friendship Hall, Honiara
Attendance: 80

15 October 2025
18:30

Boxscore

Papua New Guinea	53–37	Fiji
Scoring by quarter: 15–9, 13–10, 7–11, 18–7
Pts: Samson 16; Rebs: Angula 12; Asts: Angula 6		Pts: Kainamoli 13; Rebs: Kainamoli 14; Asts: four players 1

The Friendship Hall, Honiara
Attendance: 150

16 October 2025
13:30

Boxscore

Fiji	103–42	Vanuatu
Scoring by quarter: 26–4, 25–14, 20–12, 32–12
Pts: Taleitaki 20; Rebs: Waqairawai 15; Asts: Kainamoli 8		Pts: Kasten 17; Rebs: Edgell 8 Asts: Izono 3

The Friendship Hall, Honiara

16 October 2025
16:00

Boxscore

Solomon Islands	23–65	Papua New Guinea
Scoring by quarter: 8–21, 11–13, 4–16, 0–15
Pts: Aquillah, Tahani 6 Rebs: B. Basia 9 Asts: B. Basia 2		Pts: Tongia 15; Rebs: Asiba 8 Asts: five players 1

The Friendship Hall, Honiara

17 October 2025
11:00

Boxscore

New Caledonia	48–60	Fiji
Scoring by quarter: 15–17, 9–11, 8–15, 16–17
Pts: Ha Ho 14; Rebs: Tui 6 Asts: O. Tetuanui, M. Tetuanui 3		Pts: Kainamoli 23; Rebs: Kainamoli, Tuisue 11; Asts: Ravai 9

The Friendship Hall, Honiara
Attendance: 30

17 October 2025
18:30

Boxscore

Vanuatu	37–60	Solomon Islands
Scoring by quarter: 8–13, 12–20, 9–15, 8–12
Pts: Izono 14; Rebs: Kasten 13; Asts: three players 1		Pts: B. Basia 12; Rebs: B. Basia 8 Asts: Sade 7

The Friendship Hall, Honiara
Attendance: 250

== Third place match ==
18 October 2025

New Caledonia	0–20 (Forfeit)	Solomon Islands

Note: The New Caledonia Basketball Federation has withdrawn from the bronze medal matches against the Solomon Islands in both the men’s and women’s divisions. The decision comes as a result of travel arrangements and flight changes beyond their control. As a result, both bronze medal matches have been forfeited in favour of the Solomon Islands.

== Final ==
18 October 2025
15:30

Boxscore

Papua New Guinea	44–57	Fiji
Scoring by quarter: 16–8, 1–14, 6–20, 21–15
Pts: Muri 12; Rebs: Angula 15; Asts: Angula 3		Pts: Kainamoli 12; Rebs: Liebregts, Tuisue 9 Asts: Ravai 3

The Friendship Hall, Honiara

== Final standings ==
Rank	Team	Record
1st place, gold medalist(s)	Fiji	4–1
2nd place, silver medalist(s)	Papua New Guinea	4–1
3rd place, bronze medalist(s)	Solomon Islands	2–3
4	New Caledonia	2–3
5	Vanuatu	0–4

Qualified for the 2027 Pacific Games

== See also ==
- 2025 FIBA Melanesian Cup
