= Basketball at the 2019 Pacific Games – Men's tournament =

Basketball at the 2019 Pacific Games men's tournament
Tournament details
- Host country: Samoa
- Dates: July 8–16
- Teams: 8 (from 8 federations)
- Venue: 1 (in 1 host city)

Final positions
- Champions: Guam (4th title)

The men's basketball tournament at the 2019 Pacific Games was held in Apia, Samoa from 8–16 July. In the final, Guam won gold with a nine-point victory over Tahiti. Fiji ended up with the bronze.

== Participating teams ==
Eight countries have qualified and are expected to compete in the men's basketball tournament:

- Fiji
- Guam
- New Caledonia
- Papua New Guinea
- Samoa
- Solomon Islands
- French Polynesia
- Tonga

== Entrants ==
Qualified teams	From
Papua New Guinea; New Caledonia; Fiji; Guam; Tahiti; Samoa; Tonga; Solomon Islands	2017 FIBA Melanesia Basketball Cup (1st place); 2017 FIBA Melanesia Basketball Cup (2nd place); 2017 FIBA Melanesia Basketball Cup (3rd place); 2018 Micronesian Games (1st place); 2018 FIBA Polynesia Basketball Cup (1st place); 2018 FIBA Polynesia Basketball Cup (2nd place) & Host; 2018 FIBA Polynesia Basketball Cup (3rd place); Wild card

== Group stage ==
All times are local (UTC+13)

=== Group A ===
Pos	Team	Pld	W	L	PF	PA	PD	Pts	Qualification
1	Guam	3	3	0	295	207	+88	6	Advance to the semi-final round
2	New Caledonia	3	2	1	219	223	−4	5	Advance to the quarter-final round
3	Samoa (H)	3	1	2	242	271	−29	4	Advance to the quarter-final round
4	Tonga	3	0	3	226	281	−55	3	Advance to the classification round

Source: FIBA Oceania
Rules for classification: a. points; b. win–loss record; c. goal average; d. head-to-head records; e. quotient system
(H) Hosts

9 July 2019
14:15

Report

Tonga	71–82	New Caledonia
Scoring by quarter: 11–25, 22–14, 20–19, 18–24
Pts: Alipate 44; Rebs: Foketi 9 Asts: Paea 3		Pts: Adjouhgniope 21; Rebs: Mathelon, Tetainanuari 7 Asts: Adjouhgniope 4

Faleata Sporting Complex, Apia

9 July 2019
18:45

Report

Samoa	81–105	Guam
Scoring by quarter: 13–29, 22–20, 22–36, 24–20
Pts: Leusogi Ape 32; Rebs: Leusogi Ape, Levy 6 Asts: Atoa, Hunt 2		Pts: Hechanova 22; Rebs: R. Wesley 10; Asts: Stinnett 2

Faleata Sporting Complex, Apia

11 July 2019
14:15

Report

Tonga	65–101	Guam
Scoring by quarter: 18–19, 8–21, 14–28, 25–33
Pts: Alipate 26; Rebs: Foketi 9 Asts: Alipate 3		Pts: Simon 30; Rebs: Galloway 13; Asts: Calvo, T. Wesley 3

Faleata Sporting Complex, Apia

11 July 2019
18:45

Report

New Caledonia	76–63	Samoa
Scoring by quarter: 19–14, 13–19, 31–15, 13–15
Pts: Adjouhgniope 15; Rebs: Adjouhgniope 10; Asts: Delaunay-Belleville, Ha Ho 2		Pts: McFarland 20; Rebs: McFarland 15; Asts: Sio, McFarland, Atoa 2

Faleata Sporting Complex, Apia

13 July 2019
14:15

[Report]

Guam	89–61	New Caledonia
Scoring by quarter: –, –, –, –

Faleata Sporting Complex, Apia

13 July 2019
18:45

[Report]

Samoa	98–90	Tonga
Scoring by quarter: –, –, –, –

Faleata Sporting Complex, Apia

=== Group B ===
Pos	Team	Pld	W	L	PF	PA	PD	Pts	Qualification
1	Fiji	3	3	0	232	168	+64	6	Advance to the semi-final round
2	Papua New Guinea	3	2	1	237	177	+60	5	Advance to the quarter-final round
3	Tahiti	3	1	2	206	205	+1	4	Advance to the quarter-final round
4	Solomon Islands	3	0	3	124	249	−125	3	Advance to the classification round

Source: FIBA Oceania
Rules for classification: a. points; b. win–loss record; c. goal average; d. head-to-head records; e. quotient system

8 July 2019
14:15

Report

Papua New Guinea	86–48	Solomon Islands
Scoring by quarter: 24–15, 21–9, 18–10, 23–14
Pts: Leahy 14; Rebs: Li. Wright 8 Asts: Apiko 3		Pts: Boardman 12; Rebs: Tingiia, Masaea 6 Asts: Basia 3

Faleata Sporting Complex, Apia

8 July 2019
16:30

Report

Fiji	80–66	Tahiti
Scoring by quarter: 18–6, 16–24, 21–21, 25–15
Pts: M. Whippy 19; Rebs: M. Whippy 16; Asts: J. Fox 3		Pts: Meuel 21; Rebs: Meuel, Apeang, Tinirauarii 3 Asts: Lextreyt, Liu 3

Faleata Sporting Complex, Apia

10 July 2019
14:15

Report

Tahiti	51–93	Papua New Guinea
Scoring by quarter: 15–27, 8–21, 11–32, 17–13
Pts: Meuel 10; Rebs: Apeang 4 Asts: Meuel, Mui 2		Pts: Wright 21; Rebs: Wright 12; Asts: Hewe, Muri, Farmer 2

Faleata Sporting Complex, Apia

10 July 2019
16:30

Report

Solomon Islands	44–74	Fiji
Scoring by quarter: 10–23, 6–24, 17–17, 11–10

Faleata Sporting Complex, Apia

12 July 2019
14:15

Report

Solomon Islands	32–89	Tahiti
Scoring by quarter: 7–25, 4–19, 6–21, 15–24

Faleata Sporting Complex, Apia

12 July 2019
16:30

Report

Fiji	78–58	Papua New Guinea
Scoring by quarter: 16–17, 18–13, 25–13, 19–15

Faleata Sporting Complex, Apia

== Final round ==
Playoffs
15 July
Papua New Guinea	75
Samoa	63
15 July
New Caledonia	55
Tahiti	65

Semi-finals
16 July
Guam	122
Papua New Guinea	67
16 July
Fiji	72
Tahiti	75

Final
17 July
Guam	83
Tahiti	74
Bronze medal match
17 July
Fiji	72
Papua New Guinea	49

=== Classification 7th-8th ===
15 July 2019
11:00

Report

Tonga	100–55	Solomon Islands
Scoring by quarter: 19–12, 26–17, 24–13, 31–13

Faleata Sporting Complex, Apia

=== Playoffs ===
15 July 2019
13:00

Report

New Caledonia	55–65	Tahiti
Scoring by quarter: 15–13, 19–11, 11–21, 10–20

Faleata Sporting Complex, Apia

15 July 2019
19:00

Report

Papua New Guinea	75–63	Samoa
Scoring by quarter: 21–19, 19–15, 15–14, 20–15

Faleata Sporting Complex, Apia

=== Classification 5th-6th ===
16 July 2019
11:00

Report

New Caledonia	84–82	Samoa
Scoring by quarter: 16–20, 21–16, 27–25, 20–21

Faleata Sporting Complex, Apia

=== Semifinals ===
16 July 2019
15:00

Report

Fiji	72–75	Tahiti
Scoring by quarter: 21–22, 18–15, 10–14, 23–24

Faleata Sporting Complex, Apia

16 July 2019
19:00

Report

Guam	122–67	Papua New Guinea
Scoring by quarter: 33–19, 31–8, 33–22, 25–18

Faleata Sporting Complex, Apia

=== Bronze medal match ===
17 July 2019
13:00

Report

Fiji	72–49	Papua New Guinea
Scoring by quarter: 26–9, 15–7, 9–17, 22–16

Faleata Sporting Complex, Apia

=== Final ===
17 July 2019
18:00

Report

Tahiti	74–83	Guam
Scoring by quarter: 15–25, 17–14, 20–24, 22–20

Faleata Sporting Complex, Apia

== Final standings ==
Rank	Team	Record	Qualified to
1st place, gold medalist(s)	Guam	5–0	Pre-Qualifiers of the 2025 FIBA Asia Cup qualification
2nd place, silver medalist(s)	Tahiti	3–3	Pre-Qualifiers of the 2025 FIBA Asia Cup qualification
3rd place, bronze medalist(s)	Fiji	4–1	
4	Papua New Guinea	3–3	
5	New Caledonia	3–2	
6	Samoa	1–4	
7	Tonga	1–3	
8	Solomon Islands	0–4	
