= 2017 FIBA Women's Melanesia Basketball Cup =

1st edition of the FIBA Women's Melanesian Basketball Cup

1st FIBA Women's Melanesian Cup

Tournament details
- Host country: Papua New Guinea
- City: Port Moresby
- Dates: 27–30 September
- Teams: 4 (from 1 sub-confederation)
- Venue: 1 (in 1 host city)

Final positions
- Champions: Papua New Guinea (1st title)
- Runners-up: Fiji
- Third place: New Caledonia

Official website
- www.fiba.basketball/history

The 2017 FIBA Women's Melanesia Basketball Cup was the inaugural edition of the FIBA Melanesian Cup, an international women's basketball tournament contested by nations of the newly formed Melanesian sub-zone of FIBA Oceania. The women's tournament was played together alongside the men's event at the Taurama Aquatic and Indoor Centre in Port Moresby, Papua New Guinea, from 27 to 30 September 2017. Countdown was officially launched on 19 May 2017.

The tournament also served as the Melanesian qualifier for the women's basketball event of the 2019 Pacific Games in Samoa with three berths for Melanesia allocated for the top three teams of this tournament.

The hosts Papua New Guinea dominated the women's tournament winning all of their games including the final.

== Participating teams ==
The following national teams participated in the tournament according to FIBA.

- Fiji
- New Caledonia
- Papua New Guinea (Hosts)
- Solomon Islands
- ~~Vanuatu~~ (withdrew)

All times are local (Papua New Guinea Standard Time; UTC+10).

== Preliminary round ==
Papua New Guinea dominated the preliminary round with an unbeaten record.

Pos	Team	Pld	W	L	PF	PA	PD	Pts	Qualification
1	Papua New Guinea (H)	3	3	0	229	155	+74	6	Final
2	Fiji	3	2	1	185	166	+19	5	Final
3	Solomon Islands	3	1	2	166	234	−68	4	Third place game
4	New Caledonia	3	0	3	150	175	−25	3	Third place game

Source: FIBA
Rules for classification: 1) Points; 2) Head-to-head results; 3) Points difference; 4) Points scored.
(H) Hosts

27 September 2017
13:00

Boxscore

Solomon Islands	59–53	New Caledonia
Scoring by quarter: 14–5, 20–12, 13–17, 12–19
Pts: Sade 13; Rebs: Daiwo 8 Asts: Maea-Lee 6		Pts: Moutry 12; Rebs: Puleoto 7 Asts: Pei 2

Taurama Aquatic and Indoor Centre, Port Moresby

27 September 2017
15:00

Boxscore

Papua New Guinea	63–54	Fiji
Scoring by quarter: 16–13, 16–6, 17–16, 14–19
Pts: Koivi 11; Rebs: Angula 10; Asts: Angula 6		Pts: Whippy 18; Rebs: Whippy 13; Asts: Whippy 2

Taurama Aquatic and Indoor Centre, Port Moresby

28 September 2017
13:00

Boxscore

Fiji	76–54	Solomon Islands
Scoring by quarter: 17–20, 20–9, 22–14, 17–11
Pts: Whippy 24; Rebs: Whippy 9 Asts: Ravai 3		Pts: J.Basia 18; Rebs: Daiwo 4 Asts: Maea-Lee 3

Taurama Aquatic and Indoor Centre, Port Moresby

28 September 2017
15:00

Boxscore

New Caledonia	48–61	Papua New Guinea
Scoring by quarter: 9–16, 12–15, 13–24, 14–6
Pts: Pei 15; Rebs: Luepak 14; Asts: Moutry 2		Pts: Kairi 12; Rebs: Elavo 9 Asts: Angula 5

Taurama Aquatic and Indoor Centre, Port Moresby

29 September 2017
13:00

Boxscore

Fiji	55–49	New Caledonia
Scoring by quarter: 13–7, 10–8, 14–9, 18–25
Pts: Whippy 21; Rebs: Whippy 11; Asts: Sautu 3		Pts: Pei 12; Rebs: Luepak 10; Asts: Moutry 1

Taurama Aquatic and Indoor Centre, Port Moresby

29 September 2017
15:00

Boxscore

Papua New Guinea	105–53	Solomon Islands
Scoring by quarter: 8–16, 38–18, 25–11, 34–8
Pts: Angula 26; Rebs: Kairi; Asts: Kairi		Pts: Sade 12; Rebs: Sade; Asts: Sade

Taurama Aquatic and Indoor Centre, Port Moresby

== Final round ==
=== Bronze medal game ===
30 September 2017
13:00

Boxscore

Solomon Islands	49–60	New Caledonia
Scoring by quarter: 10–12, 12–16, 15–22, 12–10

Taurama Aquatic and Indoor Centre, Port Moresby

=== Gold medal game ===
30 September 2017
17:00

Boxscore

Papua New Guinea	77–58	Fiji
Scoring by quarter: 17–16, 22–10, 25–19, 13–13

Taurama Aquatic and Indoor Centre, Port Moresby

== Final standings ==
Rank	Team	Record
1st place, gold medalist(s)	Papua New Guinea	4–0
2nd place, silver medalist(s)	Fiji	2–2
3rd place, bronze medalist(s)	New Caledonia	1–3
4	Solomon Islands	1–3

Qualified for the 2019 Pacific Games

== Awards ==
2017 FIBA Women's Melanesian champions

Papua New Guinea
1st title

- All-Star Team:
  - (Fiji) Letava Whippy
  - (Papua New Guinea) Marca Muri
  - (New Caledonia) Yolande Luepak
  - (Papua New Guinea) Betty Angula
  - (Solomon Islands) Joycelyn Basia

== See also ==
- 2017 FIBA Melanesia Basketball Cup (men's tournament)
- 2018 FIBA Women's Polynesia Basketball Cup
- Basketball at the 2018 Micronesian Games
- Basketball at the 2019 Pacific Games
