= 2022 FIBA Women's Melanesian Cup =

2nd FIBA Women's Melanesian Cup

Tournament details
- Host country: Fiji
- City: Suva
- Dates: 26−29 October
- Teams: 4 (from 1 sub-confederation)
- Venue: 1 (in 1 host city)

Final positions
- Champions: Fiji (1st title)
- Runners-up: Papua New Guinea
- Third place: New Caledonia

Tournament statistics
- Top scorer: (New Caledonia) An Ah Tchung (17.3)
- Top rebounds: (Papua New Guinea) Angula (12.5)
- Top assists: (Papua New Guinea) Muri (3.5)
- PPG (Team): Fiji (72.5)
- RPG (Team): Fiji (48.3)
- APG (Team): Papua New Guinea (10.0)

Official website
- www.fiba.basketball/history

The 2022 FIBA Women's Melanesian Cup was the second edition of the FIBA Melanesian Cup, an international women's basketball tournament contested by national teams of the Melanesian sub-zone of FIBA Oceania. The tournament was played at the Vodafone Arena in Suva, Fiji. Originally slated to be held in 2021, the schedule was pushed further to April 2022 due to COVID-19 pandemic, with exact dates has been set to 26–29 October 2022.

The competition served as the sub-regional qualification phase for the basketball event of the 2023 Pacific Games in Solomon Islands with two berths allocated in this tournament, which serves as the official qualifier to the FIBA Asia Cup Pre-Qualifiers.

Hosts Fiji thrashed the defending champions Papua New Guinea in the championship, 71–58, to notch their maiden title. Both finalists earned the right to represent Melanesia in the women's basketball tournament of the 2023 Pacific Games, along with hosts Solomon Islands.

== Participating teams ==
The following national teams participated in the competition.

- Fiji (Host)
- New Caledonia
- Papua New Guinea
- Solomon Islands

All times are local (Fiji Time; UTC+12).

== Preliminary round ==
Pos	Team	Pld	W	L	PF	PA	PD	Pts	Qualification
1	Fiji (H)	3	3	0	219	150	+69	6	Final
2	Papua New Guinea	3	2	1	184	182	+2	5	Final
3	New Caledonia	3	1	2	197	183	+14	4	Third place game
4	Solomon Islands	3	0	3	123	208	−85	3	Third place game

Source: FIBA
Rules for classification: 1) Points; 2) Head-to-head results; 3) Points difference; 4) Points scored.
(H) Hosts

26 October 2022
12:00

Boxscore

Papua New Guinea	63–51	Solomon Islands
Scoring by quarter: 17–9, 22–6, 9–19, 15–17
Pts: Muri 17; Rebs: Angula 17; Asts: Muri 5		Pts: J. Basia 21; Rebs: J. Basia 11; Asts: B. Basia, Sade 3

Vodafone Arena, Suva

26 October 2022
17:00

Boxscore

Fiji	78–62	New Caledonia
Scoring by quarter: 16–9, 19–10, 19–23, 24–20
Pts: Koyamainavure, Vocea 15; Rebs: Whippy, Vocea 12; Asts: Koyamainavure 2		Pts: An Ah Tchung 16; Rebs: Souque 10; Asts: An Ah Tchung 3

Vodafone Arena, Suva

27 October 2022
12:00

Boxscore

New Caledonia	66–67	Papua New Guinea
Scoring by quarter: 14–11, 15–23, 12–17, 25–16
Pts: An Ah Tchung 20; Rebs: Fisiipeau 9 Asts: R. Forest 2		Pts: Muri 16; Rebs: Angula 17; Asts: Angula 5

Vodafone Arena, Suva

27 October 2022
19:30

Boxscore

Solomon Islands	34–76	Fiji
Scoring by quarter: 11–21, 9–14, 5–15, 9–26
Pts: J. Basia 12; Rebs: Van Den Heever 10; Asts: B. Basia, Van Den Heever 2		Pts: Vocea 15; Rebs: Korovou 14; Asts: Koyamainavure 4

Vodafone Arena, Suva

28 October 2022
14:30

Boxscore

New Caledonia	69–38	Solomon Islands
Scoring by quarter: 17–11, 16–11, 16–10, 20–6
Pts: An Ah Tchung, Koteureu 13; Rebs: Koteureu 10; Asts: Koteureu 3		Pts: Wanefai 16; Rebs: Wanefai 8 Asts: B. Basia 2

Vodafone Arena, Suva

28 October 2022
17:00

Boxscore

Fiji	65–54	Papua New Guinea
Scoring by quarter: 27–13, 19–16, 12–14, 7–11
Pts: Koyamainavure 21; Rebs: Whippy 9 Asts: Whippy 3		Pts: Kairi 14; Rebs: Yawasing, Angula 6 Asts: Angula 3

Vodafone Arena, Suva

== Final round ==
=== Bronze medal match ===
29 October 2022
12:00

Boxscore

New Caledonia	54–28	Solomon Islands
Scoring by quarter: 15–9, 14–7, 14–8, 11–4
Pts: An Ah Tchung 2 Rebs: Fisiipeau, Gilhodes 6 Asts: Souque 5		Pts: Wanefai 9 Rebs: B. Basia 10; Asts: Mauriasi 2

Vodafone Arena, Suva

=== Gold medal match ===
29 October 2022
17:00

Boxscore

Fiji	71–38	Papua New Guinea
Scoring by quarter: 21–10, 18–8, 12–13, 20–7
Pts: Whippy 19; Rebs: Whippy, Liebregts 6 Asts: Mendez 4		Pts: Dobunaba 14; Rebs: Angula 10; Asts: Muri, Angula 3

Vodafone Arena, Suva

== Final standings ==
Rank	Team	Record
1st place, gold medalist(s)	Fiji	4–0
2nd place, silver medalist(s)	Papua New Guinea	2–2
3rd place, bronze medalist(s)	New Caledonia	2–2
4	Solomon Islands	0–4

Qualified for the 2023 Pacific Games
Qualified for the 2023 Pacific Games as hosts

== Awards ==
2022 FIBA Women's Melanesian champions

Fiji
1st title

- All-Star Team:
  - (Papua New Guinea) Marca Muri
  - (New Caledonia) Adeline Souque
  - (Fiji) Letava Whippy
  - (Papua New Guinea) Betty Angula
  - (Fiji) Matila Vocea
