= Vanuatu at the 2010 Summer Youth Olympics =

- IOC code: VAN
- NOC: Vanuatu Association of Sports and National Olympic Committee

in Singapore
- Competitors: 22 in 2 sports
- Flag bearer: Seiloni Iaruel
- Medals: Gold 0 Silver 0 Bronze 0 Total 0

Summer Youth Olympics appearances
- 2010; 2014; 2018

Vanuatu participated in the 2010 Summer Youth Olympics in Singapore.

The Vanuatu squad consisted of 22 athletes competing in 2 sports: basketball and football.

== Basketball ==
=== Girls ===
Roster
Lavinia Edgell
Christina Izono
Emily Lango (C)
Poline Maliliu

=== Group A ===
Team	Pld	W	L	PF	PA	PD	Pts
Canada	4	4	0	90	45	+45	8
South Korea	4	3	1	83	61	+22	7
Russia	4	2	2	82	51	+31	6
Ivory Coast	4	1	3	55	82	−27	5
Vanuatu	4	0	4	44	115	−71	4

August 15
9:00

Report

Vanuatu	12–27	Canada
Scoring by quarter: 7–16, 5–11
Pts: Izono 10; Rebs: Edgell 6		Pts: Kilpatrick 11; Rebs: Kilpatrick 5 Asts: D Whyte 6

*scape Youth Space, Singapore

August 16
11:00

Report

Ivory Coast	22–19	Vanuatu
Scoring by quarter: 13–10, 9–9
Pts: Ouattara 16; Rebs: Boni 9		Pts: Maliliu 10; Rebs: Maliliu 9 Asts: Edgell 2

*scape Youth Space, Singapore

August 17
11:00

Vanuatu	8–33	South Korea
Scoring by quarter: 6–24, 2–9
Pts: Maliliu 4 Rebs: Maliliu 7 Asts: Maliliu, Edgell 1		Pts: Y. Jeong 12; Rebs: K. Kang 5 Asts: Y. Cha 4

*scape Youth Space, Singapore

August 18
9:00

Russia	33–5	Vanuatu
Scoring by quarter: 15-5, 18-0
Pts: K.Kozochkina 11; Rebs: A.Antonenko 9 Asts: E.Buykina 6		Pts: C.Izono 4 Rebs: P.Maliliu 6

*scape Youth Space, Singapore

=== 17th–20th ===
This round will be contested by the 5th-place finishers of each group to compete for 17th to 20th positions.

Team	Pld	W	L	PF	PA	PD	Pts
Thailand	3	3	0	87	56	+31	6
Chile	3	2	1	46	52	–6	5
Singapore	3	1	2	69	55	+14	4
Vanuatu	3	0	3	38	76	–38	3

21 August

Vanuatu	10–26	Singapore

22 August

Chile	17–13	Vanuatu

23 August

Vanuatu	15–33	Thailand

== Football ==
=== Boys ===
Squad List	Event	Group Stage		5th Place Match	Rank
Squad List	Event	Group C	Rank	5th Place Match	Rank
Seiloni Iaruel (C); Chanel Obed; Raoul Coulon; Yoan Ben; Jelene Waiwai; Andre Kalselik; Donald Avock; Barry Mansale; Santino Mermer; Steve Bebe; Franco Tawal; Sylver Tenene; George Mahit; Michel Coulon; Petch Ham; Edwin Bai; Jordy Meltecoin; Mois Bong	Boys' Football	Bolivia; L 0-2	3	Zimbabwe; W 2-1	5
Seiloni Iaruel (C); Chanel Obed; Raoul Coulon; Yoan Ben; Jelene Waiwai; Andre Kalselik; Donald Avock; Barry Mansale; Santino Mermer; Steve Bebe; Franco Tawal; Sylver Tenene; George Mahit; Michel Coulon; Petch Ham; Edwin Bai; Jordy Meltecoin; Mois Bong	Boys' Football	Haiti; L 1-2	3	Zimbabwe; W 2-1	5

Group C

Team	Pld	W	D	L	GF	GA	GD	Pts
Bolivia	2	2	0	0	11	0	+11	6
Haiti	2	1	0	1	2	10	−8	3
Vanuatu	2	0	0	2	1	4	−3	0

13 August 2010
18:00

Vanuatu	0 – 2	Bolivia
	Report	Añez 19' (pen.); Banegas 42'

Jalan Besar Stadium, Singapore
Attendance: 2,479
Referee: István Vad (Hungary)

19 August 2010
18:00

Haiti	2 – 1	Vanuatu
Gedeon 67'; Bonhomme 70'	Report	Ham 48'

Jalan Besar Stadium, Singapore
Attendance: 1,800
Referee: Rainhold Shikongo (Namibia)

=== 5th Place Match ===
23 August 2010
20:45

Vanuatu	2 – 0	Zimbabwe
Kalselik 20', 60'	Report

Jalan Besar Stadium, Singapore
Attendance: 1,615
Referee: Walter López (Guatemala)
