= 1997 FIBA Oceania Championship =

Continental basketball championship

FIBA Oceania Championship 1997
13th FIBA Oceanian Basketball Championship

Tournament details
- Host country: New Zealand
- Dates: June 1 – June 4
- Teams: 3 (from 21 federations)
- Venue: 2 (in 2 host cities)

Final positions
- Champions: Australia (13th title)

The FIBA Oceania Championship for Men 1997 was the qualifying tournament of FIBA Oceania for the 1998 FIBA World Championship. The tournament was held in Wellington and Palmerston North. Australia won the tournament to qualify for the World Championship.

== Venues ==
Palmerston North	1997 FIBA Oceania Championship (New Zealand)	Wellington
Arena Manawatu	1997 FIBA Oceania Championship (New Zealand)	Queens Wharf Events Centre
Capacity: 5,000	1997 FIBA Oceania Championship (New Zealand)	Capacity: 4,002

== Results ==
Pos	Team	Pld	W	L	PF	PA	PD	Pts	Qualification
1	Australia	2	2	0	235	121	+114	4	Championship
2	New Zealand (H)	2	1	1	211	138	+73	3	Championship
3	New Caledonia	2	0	2	87	274	−187	2	

(H) Hosts

September 1

Report

New Zealand	136–41	New Caledonia
Scoring by half: 68–20, 68–21

September 2

Report

Australia	97–75	New Zealand
Scoring by half: 49–44, 48–31

September 3

Report

Australia	138–46	New Caledonia
Scoring by half: 62–17, 76–29

== Championship ==
September 4

Report

Australia	85–67	New Zealand
Scoring by half: 43–43, 42–24

== Final standings ==
Rank	Team	Record
1	Australia	3–0
2	New Zealand	1–2
3	New Caledonia	0–2

Australia qualified for the 1998 FIBA World Championship in Greece.
