= 1998 FIBA World Championship =

1998 edition of the FIBA World Championship

Παγκόσμιο Πρωτάθλημα Καλαθοσφαίρισης Ανδρών 1998 FIBA pankósmio protáthlima básket 1998

Tournament details
- Host country: Greece
- Cities: Athens; Piraeus
- Dates: 29 July – 9 August
- Officially opened by: Konstantinos Stephanopoulos
- Teams: 16 (from 5 confederations)
- Venues: 2 (in 1 host city)

Final positions
- Champions: Yugoslavia (1st title)
- Runners-up: Russia
- Third place: United States
- Fourth place: Greece

Tournament statistics
- Games played: 62
- MVP: (Federal Republic of Yugoslavia) Dejan Bodiroga
- Top scorer: (Spain) Alberto Herreros (17.9 points per game)

The 1998 FIBA World Championship was the 13th FIBA World Championship, the international basketball world championship for men's national teams. The tournament was organised by the International Basketball Federation (FIBA), and hosted in Greece from 29 July to 9 August 1998. It was contested by 16 nations, with matches held at two venues, in Athens and Piraeus.

The tournament was won by FR Yugoslavia, in their first participation after the breakup of Yugoslavia, defeating Russia in the final 64–62.

Because of the National Basketball Association (NBA) lockout and unlike in the previous championship, USA Basketball was unable to send a team composed of NBA players, thus causing the American national team roster consisting of professional basketball players playing in Europe and two college players.

== Venues ==
Athens-Piraeus		Greece
Marousi, Attica	Piraeus, Attica	1998 FIBA World Championship is located in Greece
Athens Olympic Indoor Hall; Capacity: 18,700	Peace and Friendship Stadium; Capacity: 14,776	1998 FIBA World Championship is located in Greece

== Qualification ==
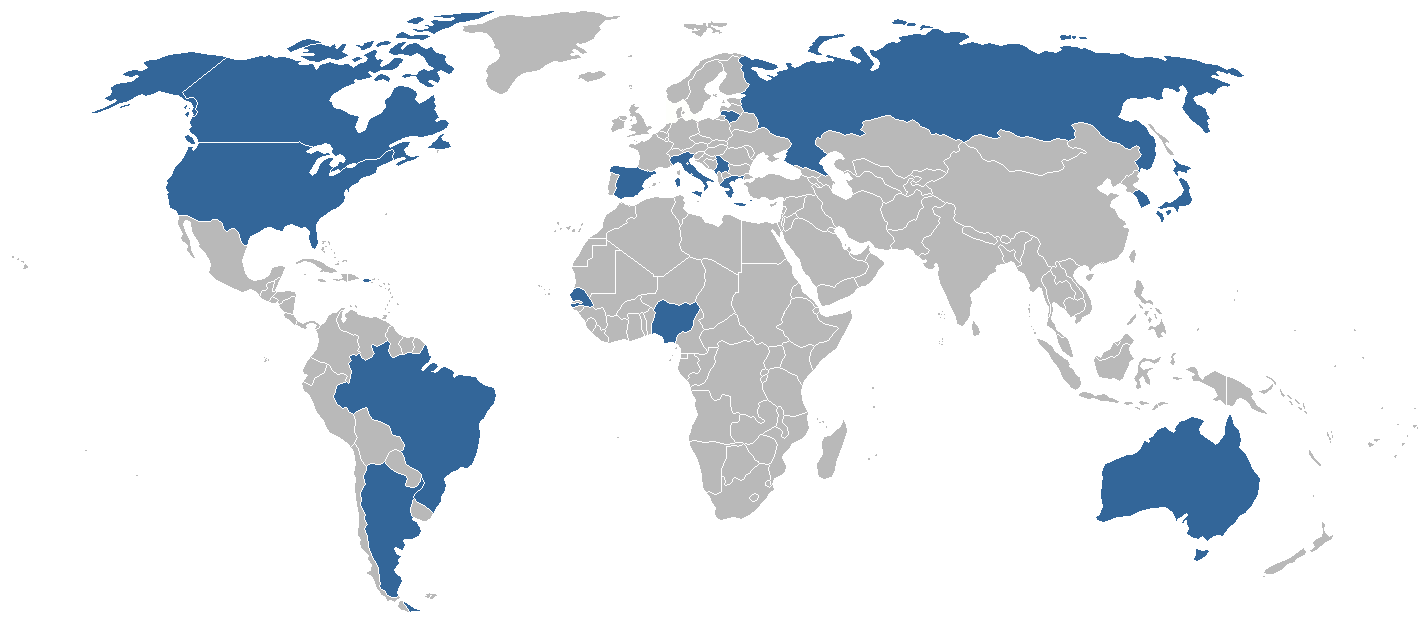
Competing teams

There were 16 teams taking part in the 1998 World Cup of Basketball. After the 1996 Olympics, the continental allocation for FIBA Americas was reduced by one when the United States won the Olympic tournament, automatically qualifying them for the 1998 World Cup.

- Host nation: 1 berth
- 1996 Summer Olympics: 12 teams competing for 1 berth, removed from that country's FIBA zone.
- FIBA Oceania: 3 teams competing for 1 berth
- FIBA Europe: 16 teams competing for 5 berths
- FIBA Africa: 9 teams competing for 2 berths
- FIBA Americas: 10 teams competing for 4 berths
- FIBA Asia: 15 teams competing for 2 berths

=== Qualified teams ===
Means of qualification	Date	Venue	Berths	Teams qualified
Host	–		1	Greece
1996 Olympics	July 20–August 3, 1996	(United States) Atlanta	1	United States
1997 FIBA Oceania Championship	June 1–4, 1997	(New Zealand) Wellington and Palmerston North	1	Australia
EuroBasket 1997	June 24–July 6, 1997	(Spain) Badalona, Girona and Barcelona	5	Yugoslavia; Italy; Russia; Spain; Lithuania
FIBA Africa Championship 1997	July 25–August 3, 1997	(Senegal) Dakar	2	Nigeria; Senegal
1997 Tournament of the Americas	August 21-31, 1997	(Uruguay) Montevideo	4	Puerto Rico; Brazil; Argentina; Canada
1997 ABC Championship	September 11-19, 1997	(Saudi Arabia) Riyadh	2	South Korea; Japan
Total			16	

== Draw ==
Group A	Group B	Group C	Group D
Canada; Greece; Italy; Senegal	Japan; Puerto Rico; Russia; Yugoslavia	Brazil; Lithuania; South Korea; United States	Argentina; Australia; Nigeria; Spain

== Preliminary round ==
The top three teams in each group advance to the second round, into either Group E or F. The fourth place team in each group moves onto the 13th–16th classification.

=== Group A ===
Pos	Team	Pld	W	L	PF	PA	PD	Pts	Qualification
1	Greece (H)	3	3	0	210	185	+25	6	Second round
2	Italy	3	2	1	211	199	+12	5	Second round
3	Canada	3	1	2	211	214	−3	4	Second round
4	Senegal	3	0	3	180	214	−34	3	13th–16th classification round

Source: FIBA archive
Rules for classification: 1) points; 2) head-to-head points; 3) head-to-head goal average; 4) head-to-head number of points scored.
(H) Hosts

29 July

Senegal	66–76	Italy
Scoring by half: 35-36, 31-40

Peace and Friendship Stadium, Piraeus, Attica

29 July

Greece	78–72	Canada
Scoring by half: 43-37, 35-35

Peace and Friendship Stadium, Piraeus, Attica

30 July

Canada	70–57	Senegal
Scoring by half: 38-30, 32-27

Athens Olympic Indoor Hall, Marousi, Athens

30 July

Italy	56–64	Greece
Scoring by half: 39-35, 17-29

Athens Olympic Indoor Hall, Marousi, Athens

31 July

Canada	69–79	Italy
Scoring by half: 31-43, 38-36

Peace and Friendship Stadium, Piraeus, Attica

31 July

Senegal	57–68	Greece
Scoring by half: 30-29, 27-39

Peace and Friendship Stadium, Piraeus, Attica

=== Group Β ===
Pos	Team	Pld	W	L	PF	PA	PD	Pts	Qualification
1	Yugoslavia	3	3	0	261	194	+67	6	Second round
2	Russia	3	2	1	243	213	+30	5	Second round
3	Puerto Rico	3	1	2	217	223	−6	4	Second round
4	Japan	3	0	3	169	260	−91	3	13th–16th classification round

Source: FIBA archive
Rules for classification: 1) points; 2) head-to-head points; 3) head-to-head goal average; 4) head-to-head number of points scored.

29 July

Japan	58–83	Russia
Scoring by half: 27-44, 31-39

Peace and Friendship Stadium, Piraeus, Attica

29 July

Yugoslavia	80–66	Puerto Rico
Scoring by half: 47-30, 33-36

Peace and Friendship Stadium, Piraeus, Attica

30 July

Puerto Rico	78–57	Japan
Scoring by half: 39-32, 39-25

Athens Olympic Indoor Hall, Marousi, Athens

30 July

Russia	74–82 (OT)	Yugoslavia
Scoring by half: 40-33, 28-35 Overtime: 6-14

Athens Olympic Indoor Hall, Marousi, Athens

31 July

Japan	54–99	Yugoslavia
Scoring by half: 26-47, 28-52

Peace and Friendship Stadium, Piraeus, Attica

31 July

Puerto Rico	73–86	Russia
Scoring by half: 41-34, 32-52

Peace and Friendship Stadium, Piraeus, Attica

=== Group C ===
Pos	Team	Pld	W	L	PF	PA	PD	Pts	Qualification
1	Lithuania	3	3	0	247	200	+47	6	Second round
2	United States	3	2	1	253	205	+48	5	Second round
3	Brazil	3	1	2	197	222	−25	4	Second round
4	South Korea	3	0	3	191	261	−70	3	13th–16th classification round

Source: FIBA archive
Rules for classification: 1) points; 2) head-to-head points; 3) head-to-head goal average; 4) head-to-head number of points scored.

29 July

South Korea	56–97	Lithuania
Scoring by half: 36-42, 20-55

Athens Olympic Indoor Hall, Marousi, Athens

29 July

United States	83–59	Brazil
Scoring by half: 40-32, 43-27

Athens Olympic Indoor Hall, Marousi, Athens

30 July

Brazil	76–73	South Korea
Scoring by half: 45-40, 31-33

Peace and Friendship Stadium, Piraeus, Attica

30 July

Lithuania	84–82	United States
Scoring by half: 47-34, 37-48

Peace and Friendship Stadium, Piraeus, Attica

31 July

Brazil	62–66	Lithuania
Scoring by half: 39-28, 23-38

Athens Olympic Indoor Hall, Marousi, Athens

31 July

South Korea	62–88	United States
Scoring by half: 34-44, 28-44

Athens Olympic Indoor Hall, Marousi, Athens

=== Group D ===
Pos	Team	Pld	W	L	PF	PA	PD	Pts	Qualification
1	Spain	3	3	0	225	211	+14	6	Second round
2	Argentina	3	2	1	201	181	+20	5	Second round
3	Australia	3	1	2	208	207	+1	4	Second round
4	Nigeria	3	0	3	183	218	−35	3	13th–16th classification round

Source: FIBA archive
Rules for classification: 1) points; 2) head-to-head points; 3) head-to-head goal average; 4) head-to-head number of points scored.

29 July

Nigeria	68–80	Spain
Scoring by half: 33-39, 35-41

Athens Olympic Indoor Hall, Marousi, Athens

29 July

Australia	62–66	Argentina
Scoring by half: 34-33, 28-33

Athens Olympic Indoor Hall, Marousi, Athens

30 July

Argentina	68–51	Nigeria
Scoring by half: 38-31, 30-20

Peace and Friendship Stadium, Piraeus, Attica

30 July

Spain	77–76	Australia
Scoring by half: 35-36, 42-40

Peace and Friendship Stadium, Piraeus, Attica

31 July

Nigeria	64–70	Australia
Scoring by half: 28-33, 36-37

Athens Olympic Indoor Hall, Marousi, Athens

31 July

Argentina	67–68 (OT)	Spain
Scoring by half: 22-31, 39-30 Overtime: 6-7

Athens Olympic Indoor Hall, Marousi, Athens

== Second round ==
First three teams in each group of the first group phase qualify to the second phase, creating two new groups of six teams. The final standings also take in account the results of previous round matches.

=== Group Ε ===
Pos	Team	Pld	W	L	PF	PA	PD	Pts	Qualification
1	Yugoslavia	6	5	1	486	366	+120	11 (Note: Head-to-head record: FR Yugoslavia 1–0 Russia)	Quarterfinals
2	Russia	6	5	1	455	388	+67	11	Quarterfinals
3	Greece (H)	6	4	2	385	379	+6	10 (Note: Head-to-head record: Greece 1–0 Italy)	Quarterfinals
4	Italy	6	4	2	395	393	+2	10	Quarterfinals
5	Puerto Rico	6	2	4	438	443	−5	8	9th–12th classification round
6	Canada	6	1	5	419	484	−65	7	9th–12th classification round

Source: FIBA archive
Rules for classification: 1) points; 2) head-to-head points; 3) head-to-head goal average; 4) head-to-head number of points scored.
(H) Hosts
Notes:

2 August

Yugoslavia	95–55	Canada
Scoring by half: 44-23, 51-32

Athens Olympic Indoor Hall, Marousi, Athens

2 August

Russia	71–55	Italy
Scoring by half: 30-30, 41-25

Athens Olympic Indoor Hall, Marousi, Athens

2 August

Puerto Rico	64–71	Greece
Scoring by half: 30-43, 34-28

Athens Olympic Indoor Hall, Marousi, Athens

3 August

Canada	81–94	Puerto Rico
Scoring by half: 42-44, 39-50

Peace and Friendship Stadium, Piraeus, Attica

3 August

Italy	61–60	Yugoslavia
Scoring by half: 25-29, 36-31

Peace and Friendship Stadium, Piraeus, Attica

3 August

Greece	48–60	Russia
Scoring by half: 24-28, 24-32

Peace and Friendship Stadium, Piraeus, Attica

4 August

Russia	81–72	Canada
Scoring by half: 42-38, 39-34

Athens Olympic Indoor Hall, Marousi, Athens

4 August

Puerto Rico	63–68	Italy
Scoring by half: 31-34, 32-34

Athens Olympic Indoor Hall, Marousi, Athens

4 August

Yugoslavia	70–56	Greece
Scoring by half: 38-30, 32-26

Athens Olympic Indoor Hall, Marousi, Athens

=== Group F ===
Pos	Team	Pld	W	L	PF	PA	PD	Pts	Qualification
1	United States	6	5	1	511	430	+81	11 (Note: Head-to-head results: United States 1–0 Spain)	Quarterfinals
2	Spain	6	5	1	457	429	+28	11	Quarterfinals
3	Lithuania	6	4	2	472	432	+40	10	Quarterfinals
4	Argentina	6	3	3	436	428	+8	9 (Note: Head-to-head results: Argentina 1–0 Australia)	Quarterfinals
5	Australia	6	3	3	432	427	+5	9	9th–12th classification round
6	Brazil	6	1	5	399	456	−57	7	9th–12th classification round

Source: FIBA archive
Rules for classification: 1) points; 2) head-to-head points; 3) head-to-head goal average; 4) head-to-head number of points scored.
Notes:

2 August

Australia	71–61	Lithuania
Scoring by half: 35-37, 36-24

Peace and Friendship Stadium, Piraeus, Attica

2 August

Argentina	74–87	United States
Scoring by half: 38-47, 36-40

Peace and Friendship Stadium, Piraeus, Athens

2 August

Spain	73–63	Brazil
Scoring by half: 31-24, 42-39

Peace and Friendship Stadium, Piraeus, Attica

3 August

Lithuania	84–75	Argentina
Scoring by half: 41-33, 43-42

Athens Olympic Indoor Hall, Marousi, Athens

3 August

Brazil	63–75	Australia
Scoring by half: 35-31, 28-44

Athens Olympic Indoor Hall, Marousi, Athens

3 August

United States	75–73	Spain
Scoring by half: 31-42, 44-31

Athens Olympic Indoor Hall, Marousi, Athens

4 August

Spain	86–80 (OT)	Lithuania
Scoring by half: 43-40, 32-35 Overtime: 11-5

Peace and Friendship Stadium, Piraeus, Attica

4 August

Argentina	86–76	Brazil
Scoring by half: 42-38, 44-38

Peace and Friendship Stadium, Piraeus, Attica

4 August

Australia	78–96	United States
Scoring by half: 31-54, 37-42

Peace and Friendship Stadium, Piraeus, Attica

== Classification round ==
=== 13th–16th classification ===
Thirteenth to sixteenth
2 August 1998
Senegal	55
Japan	60
2 August 1998
South Korea	65
Nigeria	89

Thirteenth place
3 August 1998
Japan	60
Nigeria	70
Fifteenth place
3 August 1998
Senegal	75
South Korea	72

==== Semifinals ====
2 August

Senegal	55–60	Japan
Scoring by half: 29-27, 26-33

Athens Olympic Indoor Hall, Marousi, Athens

2 August

South Korea	65–89	Nigeria
Scoring by half: 36-45, 29-44

Peace and Friendship Stadium, Piraeus, Attica

==== Fifteenth place playoff ====
3 August

Senegal	75–72	South Korea
Scoring by half: 45-42, 30-30

Peace and Friendship Stadium, Piraeus, Attica

==== Thirteenth place playoff ====
3 August

Japan	60–70	Nigeria
Scoring by half: 23-33, 37-37

Athens Olympic Indoor Hall, Marousi, Athens

=== 9th–12th classification ===
Ninth to twelfth
7 August 1998
Puerto Rico	64
Brazil	76
7 August 1998
Canada	71
Australia	88

Ninth place
8 August 1998
Brazil	75
Australia	79
Eleventh place
8 August 1998
Puerto Rico	92
Canada	81

==== Semifinals ====
7 August

Puerto Rico	64–76	Brazil
Scoring by half: 27-38, 37-38

Athens Olympic Indoor Hall, Marousi, Athens

7 August

Australia	88–71	Canada
Scoring by half: 39-35, 49-36

Athens Olympic Indoor Hall, Marousi, Athens

==== Eleventh place playoff ====
8 August

Puerto Rico	92–81	Canada
Scoring by half: 60-33, 32-48

Athens Olympic Indoor Hall, Marousi, Athens

==== Ninth place playoff ====
8 August

Brazil	75–79	Australia
Scoring by half: 40-35, 35-44

Athens Olympic Indoor Hall, Marousi, Athens

== 5th–8th classification ==
5th–8th place
8 August 1998
Lithuania	71
Italy	76
8 August 1998
Argentina	64
Spain	77

5th place
9 August 1998
Italy	61
Spain	64
7th place
9 August 1998
Lithuania	77
Argentina	76

=== Semifinals ===
8 August

Argentina	64–77	Spain
Scoring by half: 34-37, 30-40

Athens Olympic Indoor Hall, Marousi, Athens

8 August

Lithuania	71–76	Italy
Scoring by half: 42-46, 29-30

Athens Olympic Indoor Hall, Marousi, Athens

=== Seventh place playoff ===
9 August

Argentina	76–77	Lithuania
Scoring by half: 38-47, 38-30

Athens Olympic Indoor Hall, Marousi, Athens

=== Fifth place playoff ===
9 August

Spain	64–61	Italy
Scoring by half: 32-32, 32-29

Athens Olympic Indoor Hall, Marousi, Athens

== Final round ==
Quarter-finals
7 August 1998
Russia	82
Lithuania	67
7 August 1998
Italy	77
United States	80
7 August 1998
Yugoslavia	70
Argentina	62
7 August 1998
Greece	69
Spain	62

Semi-finals
8 August 1998
Russia	66
United States	64
8 August 1998
Yugoslavia (OT)	78
Greece	73

Final
9 August 1998
Russia	62
Yugoslavia	64
Third place
9 August 1998
United States	84
Greece	61

=== Quarterfinals ===
7 August

Yugoslavia	70–62	Argentina
Scoring by half: 34-31, 36-31

Athens Olympic Indoor Hall, Marousi, Attica

7 August

Russia	82–67	Lithuania
Scoring by half: 35-38, 47-29

Athens Olympic Indoor Hall, Marousi, Attica

7 August

United States	80–77	Italy
Scoring by half: 38-41, 42-36

Athens Olympic Indoor Hall, Marousi, Attica

7 August

Spain	62–69	Greece
Scoring by half: 34-40, 28-29

Athens Olympic Indoor Hall, Marousi, Attica

=== Semifinals ===
8 August

Yugoslavia	78–73 (OT)	Greece
Scoring by half: 31-33, 26-24 Overtime: 21-16

Athens Olympic Indoor Hall, Marousi, Attica

8 August

Russia	66–64	United States
Scoring by half: 37-39, 29-25

Athens Olympic Indoor Hall, Marousi, Attica

=== Third place playoff ===
9 August
17:45

Boxscore

Greece	61–84	United States
Scoring by half: 27–48, 34–36
Pts: Papanikolaou 18; Rebs: Fasoulas 10; Asts: Fasoulas 3		Pts: Sasser 23; Rebs: Amaya 7 Asts: Hawkins 5

Athens Olympic Indoor Hall, Marousi, Attica
Attendance: 20,000
Referees: Bill Mildenhall (AUS), Romualdas Brazauskas (LTU)

=== Final ===
9 August
20:00

Boxscore

Yugoslavia	64–62	Russia
Scoring by half: 30–35, 34–27
Pts: Rebrača 16; Rebs: Rebrača 11; Asts: Bodiroga 2		Pts: Kudelin 14; Rebs: Kisurin 5 Asts: Kisurin 2

Athens Olympic Indoor Hall, Marousi, Attica
Attendance: 20,000
Referees: Reuven Virovnik (ISR), Juan Figueroa (PUR)

== Awards ==
1998 World Championship winner

Yugoslavia
First title

MVP
(Federal Republic of Yugoslavia) Dejan Bodiroga

== Final standings ==
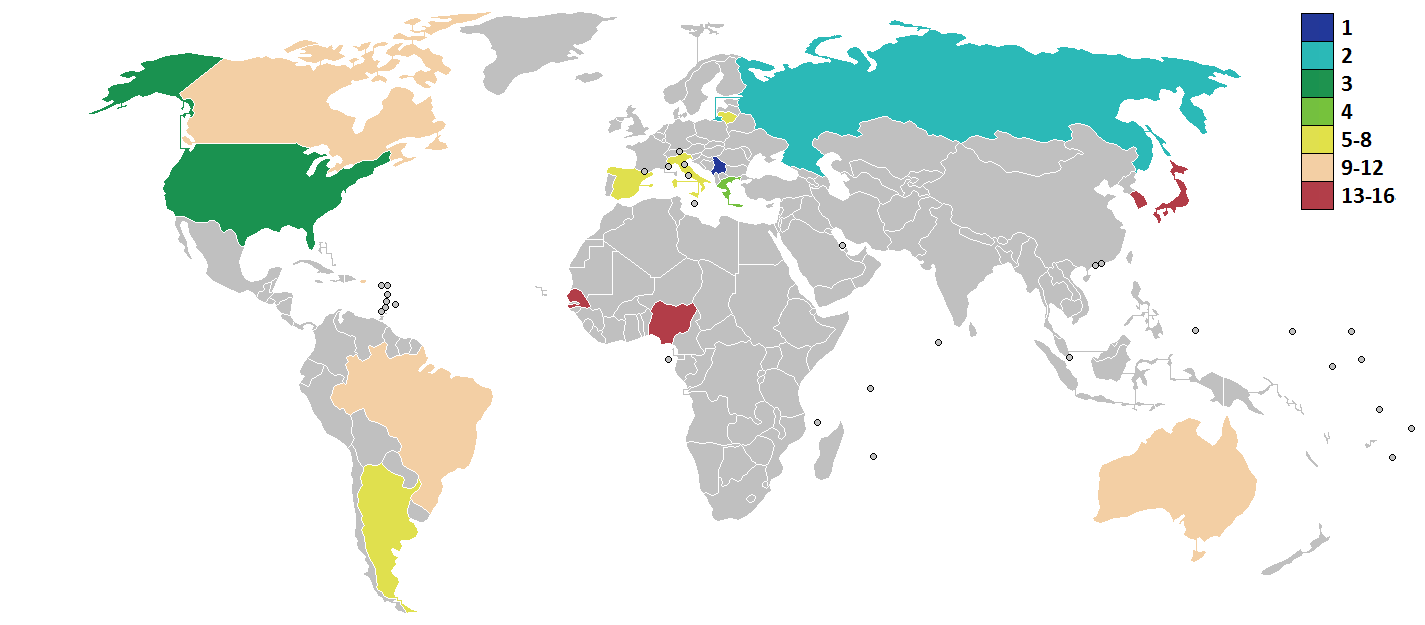
1998 FIBA World Championship final rankings.

Rank	Team	Record
1	Yugoslavia	8–1
2	Russia	7–2
3	United States	7–2
4	Greece	5–4
5	Spain	7–2
6	Italy	5–4
7	Lithuania	5–4
8	Argentina	3–6
9	Australia	5–3
10	Brazil	2–6
11	Puerto Rico	3–5
12	Canada	1–7
13	Nigeria	2–3
14	Japan	1–4
15	Senegal	1–4
16	South Korea	0–5

== All-Tournament Team ==
- (Russia) Vasili Karasev
- (Spain) Alberto Herreros
- (Federal Republic of Yugoslavia) Dejan Bodiroga — MVP
- (Italy) Gregor Fučka
- (Federal Republic of Yugoslavia) Željko Rebrača

== Top scorers ==
Country	Name	Ppg
(Spain)	Alberto Herreros	17.9
(Nigeria)	Mohammed Acha	17.5
(Lithuania)	Artūras Karnišovas	17.1
(Australia)	Shane Heal	17.0
(Australia)	Andrew Gaze	16.8
(Puerto Rico)	José "Piculín" Ortiz	16.5
(Japan)	Maikeru Takahashi	16.4
(Russia)	Vasili Karasev	16.1
(South Korea)	Seo Jang-hoon	15.2
(Federal Republic of Yugoslavia)	Dejan Bodiroga	14.7
