= Fiji men's national basketball team =

Fiji
- FIBA ranking: 140 ▲2 (1 September 2026)
- Joined FIBA: 1979
- FIBA zone: FIBA Oceania
- National federation: Fiji Amateur Basketball Federation

Oceanian Championship
- Appearances: None

Pacific Games
- Appearances: ?
- Medals: (1): 2007 (3): 1983, 1987, 2015 (1): 1995
Home	Away

The Fijian national basketball team is the team that represents Fiji in international basketball, administered by the Fiji Amateur Basketball Federation. It is a member of FIBA Oceania.

The men's team is led by New Zealand NBL player Marques Whippy and his brothers Leonard and Waymann. Their father, Paul Whippy, has previously coached the men's team.

In 2007, the men's team won the gold medal at the South Pacific Games.

== Competitive performances ==
=== FIBA Oceania Championship ===
Never participated

=== Oceania Basketball Tournament ===
- 1981 : 4th
- 1985 : (bronze)
- 1989 : 4th
- 1993 : 4th
- 1997 : 4th
- 2001 : (silver)
- 2005 : 3rd
- 2009-2013 : ?

=== Commonwealth Games ===
Never participated

=== Pacific Games ===
- 1963 : 6th
- 1966 : ?
- 1969 : 7th
- 1971-1979 : ?
- 1983 : 4th
- 1987 : (silver)
- 1991 : 4th
- 1995 : (bronze)
- 1999 : 4th
- 2003 : 4th
- 2007 : (gold)
- 2011 : 4th
- 2015 : (silver)
- 2019 : (bronze)
- 2023 : (gold)

=== Pacific Mini Games ===
- 1997 : ?
- 2005 : (bronze)
- 2017 : To be determined

=== FIBA Melanesia Cup ===
- 2017 : (bronze)
- 2022 : (bronze)
- 2025 : (silver)

== Current team ==
2029 FIBA Asia Cup Pre-Qualifiers Second Round Team

As of 18 November 2026:

Fiji men's national basketball team roster
Players
Coaches

Pos.	No.	Name	Age – Date of birth	Height	Club
G/F	0	Isaac Sewabu	20 – 11 April 2006	6 ft 6 in (1.98 m)	Boston	(Fiji)
C	1	Ioane Naivalurua	42 – 10 December 1983	6 ft 6 in (1.98 m)	Kaunikuila Basketball Club	(Fiji)
F	2	Adriel Tuivanuavou	24 – 18 July 2002	6 ft 3 in (1.91 m)	Zodiacs	(Fiji)
G	3	Nikhil Peters	28 – 21 October 1998	6 ft 4 in (1.93 m)	South West Metro Pirates	(Australia)
G/F	4	Gabriel Tuivanuavou	20 – 25 September 2006	6 ft 4 in (1.93 m)	Zodiacs	(Fiji)
G	5	Filimone Waqabaca	25 – 25 May 2001	6 ft 1 in (1.85 m)	Kaunikuila Basketball Club	(Fiji)
G/F	6	Hayden Carr	23 – 17 April 2003		Nadi	(Fiji)
G	7	Orisi Naivalurua	35 – 28 June 1991	6 ft 0 in (1.83 m)	USP	(Fiji)
G	8	Tyrone Mclennan	25 – 28 November 2000	6 ft 2 in (1.88 m)	Boston	(Fiji)
G	9	Jordan Lum Kon	35 – 13 May 1991	5 ft 11 in (1.8 m)	Gold Coast Rollers	(Australia)
F/C	10	Joshua Fox	32 – 2 April 1994	6 ft 6 in (1.98 m)	Boston	(Fiji)
G	55	Zechariah Tuivanuavou	18 – 20 November 2008	6 ft 4 in (1.93 m)	Zodiacs	(Fiji)
G	(NTR)	John Mar	22 – 24 June 2004	5 ft 11 in (1.8 m)	Boston	(Fiji)
C	(NTR)	Joshua Motufaga	34 – 5 August 1992	6 ft 5 in (1.96 m)	Kaunikuila Basketball Club	(Fiji)
F/C	(NTR)	William Qounadovu	34 – 6 July 1992	6 ft 4 in (1.93 m)	Kaunikuila Basketball Club	(Fiji)

Head coach

Manoa Puamau

Legend

- (NTR) – Non-travelling reserve
- Club – describes last
  club before the tournament
- Age – describes age
  on 26 November 2026

=== Depth chart ===
Pos.	Starting 5	Bench 1	Bench 2
C	Ioane Naivalurua	Adriel Tuivanuavou	Joshua Motufaga
PF	Joshua Fox	Isaac Sewabu	William Qounadovu
SF	Nikhil Peters	Gabriel Tuivanuavou	Hayden Carr
SG	Filimone Waqabaca	Tyrone Mclennan	Orisi Naivalurua
PG	Jordan Lum Kon	Zechariah Tuivanuavou	John Mar

== Head coach position ==
- (Fiji) Michael Whippy - 2003
- (Fiji) Paul Whippy - 2007-2011
- (Fiji) Saula Koroi - 2013
- (Fiji) Laisiasa Puamau - 2023
- (Fiji) Earl Hughes - 2025

== Past teams ==
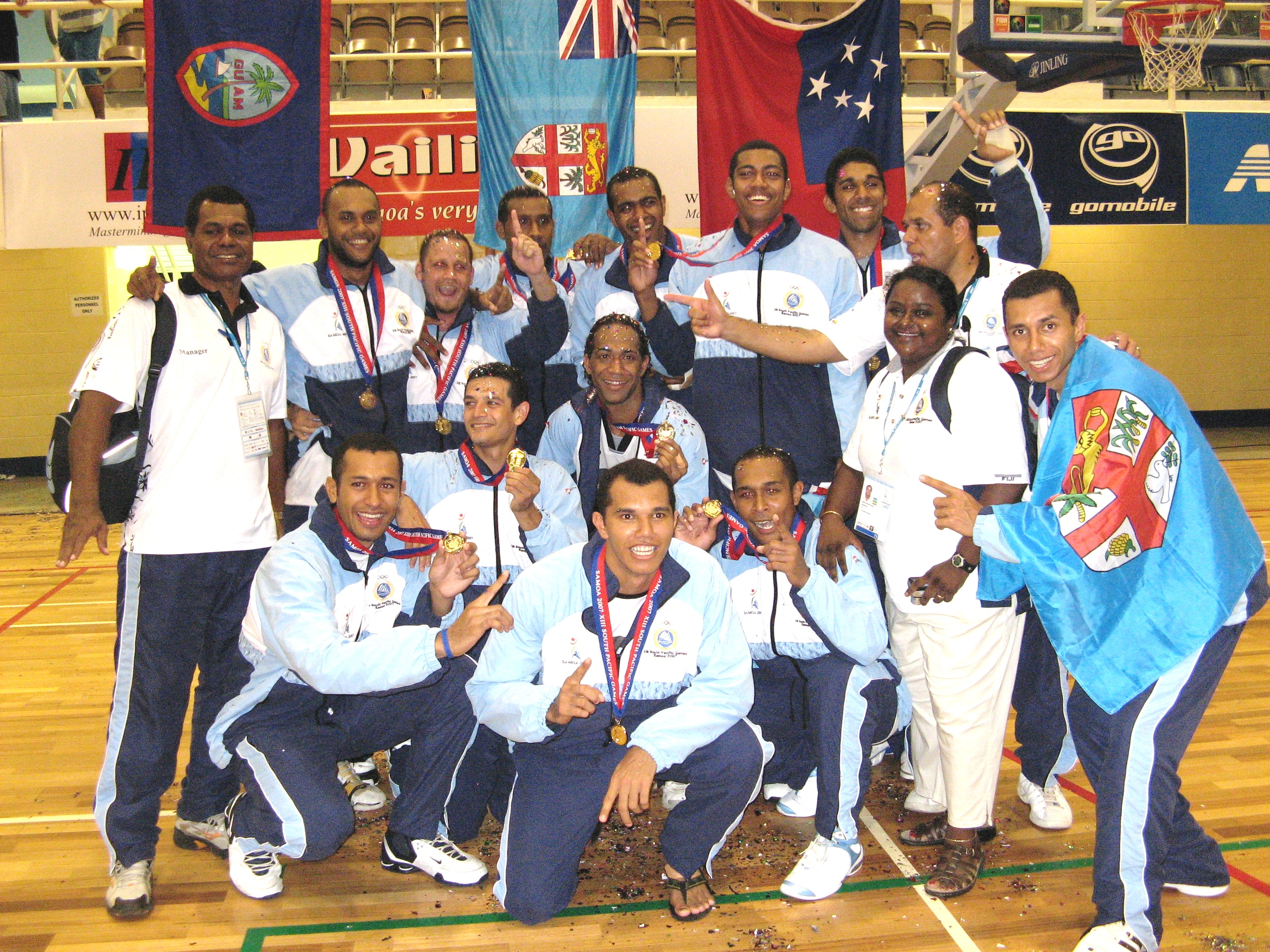
Fiji Men's Gold Medal basketball team 2007 South Pacific Games Samoa

=== 2007 Men (Gold Medal Pacific Games) ===
- Adrian Bossley
- Baravi Thaman
- Frank Saketa
- Ioane Naivalurua
- Isikeli Mara
- Jale Vunisa
- Kolinio Matalau
- Laisiasa Puamau
- Leonard Whippy
- Marques Whippy
- Peniasi Sokosoko
- Sakiusa Rokodi
- Paul Whippy (Head Coach)

=== 2017 Men (Bronze Medal Melanesian Cup) ===
As of 27 September 2017:

Fiji men's national basketball team roster
Players
Coaches

Pos.	No.	Name	Age – Date of birth	Height	Club
F	4	Marques Whippy	31 – 5 February 1986	6 ft 4 in (1.93 m)		(Fiji)
F	5	Waymann Whippy	28 – 29 March 1989	6 ft 3 in (1.91 m)		(Fiji)
G/F	6	Benjamin Colata	23 – 12 May 1994	6 ft 2 in (1.88 m)		(Fiji)
G/F	7	Esala Banuve	26 – 14 June 1991	6 ft 5 in (1.96 m)		(Fiji)
F	8	Joshua Uluiviti	22 – 12 April 1995	6 ft 2 in (1.88 m)		(Fiji)
G	9	Henry Tabuduka	26 – 25 June 1991	5 ft 8 in (1.73 m)		(Fiji)
G	10	Bryan Ah Jack	22 – 5 July 1995	5 ft 8 in (1.73 m)		(Fiji)
C	11	William Qounadovu	25 – 6 July 1992	6 ft 4 in (1.93 m)		(Fiji)
G/F	12	Jese Sikivou	28 – 26 April 1989	6 ft 0 in (1.83 m)		(Fiji)
C	13	Joshua Motufaga	25 – 5 August 1992	6 ft 5 in (1.96 m)		(Fiji)
G/F	14	Orisi Naivalurua	26 – 28 June 1991	6 ft 0 in (1.83 m)		(Fiji)

Head coach

Ratu Saketa

Assistant coach(es)

Leonard Whippy

Legend

- Club – describes last
  club before the tournament
- Age – describes age
  on 27 September 2017

=== 2018 Men (2022 FIBA Asia Cup qualification) ===
As of 26 November 2018:

Fiji men's national basketball team roster
Players
Coaches

Pos.	No.	Name	Age – Date of birth	Height	Club
F/C	4	Ulaiasi Koroi	24 – 16 May 1994	6 ft 4 in (1.93 m)		(Fiji)
F	5	Semesa Seruvatu	33 – 28 January 1985	6 ft 2 in (1.88 m)		(Fiji)
C	6	Digitaki Kacibalavu	24 – 23 October 1994	6 ft 3 in (1.91 m)		(Fiji)
G/F	7	Orisi Naivalurua	27 – 28 June 1991	6 ft 0 in (1.83 m)		(Fiji)
G	8	Farrell Maharaj	34 – 23 January 1984	6 ft 0 in (1.83 m)		(Fiji)
G	9	Henry Tabuduka	27 – 25 June 1991	5 ft 8 in (1.73 m)		(Fiji)
F	10	Joshua Fox	24 – 2 April 1994	6 ft 6 in (1.98 m)		(Fiji)
G	11	Bryan Ah Jack	23 – 5 July 1995	5 ft 8 in (1.73 m)		(Fiji)
G/F	12	Jese Sikivou	29 – 26 April 1989	6 ft 0 in (1.83 m)		(Fiji)
G/F	13	Tu'i Sikivou	31 – 14 June 1987	6 ft 0 in (1.83 m)		(Fiji)
G/F	14	Isimeli Koroi	20 – 10 September 1998	6 ft 2 in (1.88 m)		(Fiji)
G	15	Johnny Seruvatu	30 – 31 October 1988	6 ft 0 in (1.83 m)		(Fiji)

Legend

- Club – describes last
  club before the tournament
- Age – describes age
  on 26 November 2018

=== 2019 Men (Bronze Medal Pacific Games) ===
As of 8 July 2019:

Fiji men's national basketball team roster
Players
Coaches

Pos.	No.	Name	Age – Date of birth	Height	Club
F	4	Marques Whippy	33 – 5 February 1986	6 ft 4 in (1.93 m)		(Fiji)
G	5	Filimone Waqabaca	18 – 25 May 2001	6 ft 1 in (1.85 m)	USP Islanders	(Fiji)
G	6	Isireli Vuetibau	26 – 18 May 1993	6 ft 1 in (1.85 m)		(Fiji)
G/F	7	Orisi Naivalurua	28 – 28 June 1991	6 ft 0 in (1.83 m)	USP Islanders	(Fiji)
F	8	Conrad Fox	27 – 7 March 1992	6 ft 3 in (1.91 m)		(Fiji)
G	9	Leonard Whippy	36 – 27 October 1982	5 ft 11 in (1.8 m)		(Fiji)
F	10	Joshua Fox	25 – 2 April 1994	6 ft 6 in (1.98 m)		(Fiji)
G	11	Henry Tabuduka	28 – 25 June 1991	5 ft 8 in (1.73 m)		(Fiji)
C	12	Joshua Motufaga	26 – 5 August 1992	6 ft 5 in (1.96 m)	USP Islanders	(Fiji)
C	13	Mataika Koyamainavure	25 – 14 May 1994	6 ft 8 in (2.03 m)	Boston	(Fiji)
G	14	Marika Binatagi	28 – 16 September 1990	5 ft 11 in (1.8 m)		(Fiji)
F/C	15	Iliesa Salauca	18 – 28 September 2000	6 ft 5 in (1.96 m)		(Fiji)

Head coach

Saula Koroi

Legend

- Club – describes last
  club before the tournament
- Age – describes age
  on 8 July 2019

=== 2022 Men (Bronze Medal Melanesian Cup) ===
As of 26 October 2022:

Fiji men's national basketball team roster
Players
Coaches

Pos.	No.	Name	Age – Date of birth	Height	Club
C	4	Victor Koyamainavure	24 – 13 June 1998	6 ft 2 in (1.88 m)		(Fiji)
G	5	Filimone Waqabaca	21 – 25 May 2001	6 ft 1 in (1.85 m)	USP Islanders	(Fiji)
G/F	6	Orisi Naivalurua	31 – 28 June 1991	6 ft 0 in (1.83 m)	USP Islanders	(Fiji)
G/F	7	Esala Banuve	31 – 14 June 1991	6 ft 5 in (1.96 m)		(Fiji)
G/F	8	Isimeli Koroi	24 – 10 September 1998	6 ft 2 in (1.88 m)	Boston	(Fiji)
G	9	Collin Lal	24 – 11 June 1998	5 ft 9 in (1.75 m)		(Fiji)
F	10	Joshua Fox	28 – 2 April 1994	6 ft 6 in (1.98 m)		(Fiji)
G	11	Bryan Ah Jack	27 – 5 July 1995	5 ft 8 in (1.73 m)		(Fiji)
F	12	Joshua Uluiviti	27 – 12 April 1995	6 ft 2 in (1.88 m)		(Fiji)
C	13	Mataika Koyamainavure	28 – 14 May 1994	6 ft 8 in (2.03 m)	Boston	(Fiji)
F/C	14	Nalani May	18 – 5 June 2004	6 ft 4 in (1.93 m)		(Fiji)
C	15	Josaia Qalotaki	29 – 9 February 1993	6 ft 6 in (1.98 m)		(Fiji)

Head coach

Leonard Whippy

Assistant coach(es)

William Peter

Legend

- Club – describes last
  club before the tournament
- Age – describes age
  on 26 October 2022
- * - Denotes non-travelling reserve player

=== 2023 Men (Gold Medal Pacific Games) ===
As of 21 September 2023:

Fiji men's national basketball team roster
Players
Coaches

Pos.	No.	Name	Age – Date of birth	Height	Club
G	21	Jordan Lum Kon	32 – 13 May 1991	5 ft 11 in (1.8 m)	Saints	(Fiji)
G	0	Tyrone Mclennan	23 – 28 October 2000	6 ft 2 in (1.88 m)	Woodville Warriors	(Australia)
G	5	Filimone Waqabaca	22 – 25 May 2001	6 ft 1 in (1.85 m)	USP Islanders	(Fiji)
G/F	7	Orisi Rawaqa Naivalurua	32 – 28 June 1991	6 ft 0 in (1.83 m)	USP Islanders	(Fiji)
G/F	12	Keenan Hughes	19 – 25 July 2004	5 ft 10 in (1.78 m)	Suva Ballers	(Fiji)
G/F	24	Isimeli Koroi	25 – 10 September 1998	6 ft 2 in (1.88 m)	Boston	(Fiji)
G/F	8	John Francis Yee Chief	24 – 7 April 1999	6 ft 0 in (1.83 m)	USP Islanders	(Fiji)
F	10	Joshua Fox	29 – 2 April 1994	6 ft 6 in (1.98 m)	Boston	(Fiji)
F	4	Marques Whippy	37 – 5 February 1986	6 ft 4 in (1.93 m)	Saints	(New Zealand)
C	6	Joshua Motufaga	31 – 5 August 1992	6 ft 5 in (1.96 m)	USP Islanders	(Fiji)
C	13	Mataika Koyamainavure	29 – 14 May 1994	6 ft 8 in (2.03 m)	Boston	(Fiji)
C	11	William Qounadovu	31 – 6 July 1992	6 ft 4 in (1.93 m)	Spartans	(Fiji)

Head coach

Laisiasa Puamau

Legend

- Club – describes last
  club before the tournament
- Age – describes age
  on 17 November 2023
- * - Denotes non-travelling reserve player

=== 2025 Men (Silver Medal FIBA Melanesian Basketball Cup) ===
As of 11 October 2025:

Fiji men's national basketball team roster
Players
Coaches

Pos.	No.	Name	Age – Date of birth	Height	Club
C	1	Ioane Naivalurua	41 – 10 December 1983	6 ft 6 in (1.98 m)	USP Islanders	(Fiji)
G/F	2	Gabriel Tuivanuavou	19 – 25 September 2006	6 ft 4 in (1.93 m)	Zodiacs	(Fiji)
F	3	Tevita Vocea	20 – 13 November 2004	6 ft 1 in (1.85 m)	Stripling Warriors	(Fiji)
F	4	Isimeli Koroi	27 – 10 September 1998	6 ft 2 in (1.88 m)	Boston	(Fiji)
G	5	Filimone Waqabaca	24 – 25 May 2001	6 ft 1 in (1.85 m)	USP Islanders	(Fiji)
C	6	Joshua Motufaga	33 – 5 August 1992	6 ft 5 in (1.96 m)	USP Islanders	(Fiji)
G/F	7	Orisi Naivalurua	34 – 28 June 1991	6 ft 0 in (1.83 m)	USP Islanders	(Fiji)
G	8	Tyrone Mclennan	24 – 28 November 2000	6 ft 2 in (1.88 m)	Boston	(Fiji)
F/C	9	Joshua Fox	31 – 2 April 1994	6 ft 6 in (1.98 m)	Boston	(Fiji)
G	10	Jordan Lum Kon	34 – 13 May 1991	5 ft 11 in (1.8 m)	Gold Coast Rollers	(Australia)
F/C	11	William Qounadovu	33 – 6 July 1992	6 ft 4 in (1.93 m)	Spartans	(Fiji)
G/F	12	Keenan Hughes	26 – 7 July 1999	6 ft 2 in (1.88 m)	Zodiacs	(Fiji)

Head coach

Earl Hughes

Assistant coach(es)

Manoa Puamau

Legend

- Club – describes last
  club before the tournament
- Age – describes age
  on 13 October 2025

=== 2029 FIBA Asia Cup Pre-Qualifiers First Round ===
Fiji men's national basketball team roster
Players
Coaches

Pos.	No.	Name	Age – Date of birth	Height	Club
C	1	Ioane Naivalurua	42 – 10 December 1983	6 ft 6 in (1.98 m)	Kaunikuila Basketball Club	(Fiji)
G	14	Zechariah Tuivanuavou	17 – 20 November 2008	6 ft 4 in (1.93 m)	Zodiacs	(Fiji)
G	15	John Mar	22 – 24 June 2004	5 ft 11 in (1.8 m)	Boston	(Fiji)
G/F	2	Gabriel Tuivanuavou	19 – 25 September 2006	6 ft 4 in (1.93 m)	Zodiacs	(Fiji)
G	5	Filimone Waqabaca	25 – 25 May 2001	6 ft 1 in (1.85 m)	Kaunikuila Basketball Club	(Fiji)
C	6	Joshua Motufaga	34 – 5 August 1992	6 ft 5 in (1.96 m)	Kaunikuila Basketball Club	(Fiji)
F	3	Adriel Tuivanuavou	24 – 8 July 2002	6 ft 3 in (1.91 m)	Zodiacs	(Fiji)
G	8	Tyrone Mclennan	25 – 28 November 2000	6 ft 2 in (1.88 m)	Boston	(Fiji)
F/C	9	Joshua Fox	32 – 2 April 1994	6 ft 6 in (1.98 m)	Boston	(Fiji)
G	10	Jordan Lum Kon	35 – 13 May 1991	5 ft 11 in (1.8 m)	Gold Coast Rollers	(Australia)
F/C	11	William Qounadovu	34 – 6 July 1992	6 ft 4 in (1.93 m)	Kaunikuila Basketball Club	(Fiji)
F/C	13	Victor Koyamainavure	28 – 13 June 1998	6 ft 2 in (1.88 m)	Boston	(Fiji)

Head coach

Manoa Puamau

Legend

- Club – describes last
  club before the tournament
- Age – describes age
  on 13 October 2025

== Kit ==
=== Manufacturer ===
2015: BLK

== See also ==
- Fiji national under-19 basketball team
- Fiji women's national basketball team
