= Matila Vocea =

Fijian netball player (born 2000)

Personal information
- Born: 18 June 2000 (age 26)
- Occupation: netball player

Netball career
- Playing positions: goal attack, goal shooter

Matila Vocea (born 18 June 2000) is a Fijian netball player who plays for her home country in the position of goal attack or goal shooter. She was included in the Fijian squad for the 2019 Netball World Cup, which was also her first appearance at a Netball World Cup.

In November 2022 she was selected for the team for the 2022 Netball Singapore Nations Cup.
