= Time in Solomon Islands =

Time in Solomon Islands is given by Solomon Islands Time (SBT; UTC+11:00). Solomon Islands does not have an associated daylight saving time.

== IANA time zone database ==
The IANA time zone database gives the Solomon Islands one time zone, Pacific/Guadalcanal.

c.c.*	coordinates*	TZ*	Comments	UTC offset	DST
SB	−0932+16012	Pacific/Guadalcanal	Pohnpei	+11:00	+11:00
