= Vanuatu men's national basketball team =

Vanuatu
- FIBA ranking: 157 ▼3 (1 September 2026)
- Joined FIBA: 1966
- FIBA zone: FIBA Oceania
- National federation: Vanuatu Amateur Basketball Federation
- Coach: ?

FIBA Oceania Championship
- Appearances: None

Pacific Games
- Appearances: ?
- Medals: None
Home	Away

The Vanuatu national basketball team are the basketball team that represent Vanuatu in international competitions. It is administered by the Vanuatu Amateur Basketball Federation.

== Competitive record ==
=== FIBA Oceania Championship ===
never participated

=== Pacific Games ===
?

=== Oceania Basketball Tournament ===
never participated

== See also ==
- Vanuatu women's national basketball team
