= Marques Whippy =

Fijian basketball player

Personal information
- Born: February 5, 1986 (age 40) Suva, Fiji
- Listed height: 192 cm (6 ft 4 in)

Career information
- High school: LDS Church College (Suva, Fiji); Woods Cross (Woods Cross, Utah)
- College: BYU–Hawaii (2007–2011)
- NBA draft: 2011: undrafted
- Playing career: 2011–2017
- Position: Power forward

Career history
- 2011–2012: Bàsquet Mallorca
- 2012: Brisbane Spartans
- 2013: Northside Wizards
- 2013: CD Universidad Católica
- 2014: Otago Nuggets
- 2015–2017: Canterbury Rams

Career highlights
- Pacific West Player of the Year (2011); 2× First-team All-Pacific West (2010, 2011); Second-team All-Pacific West (2009)
Medals
Representing Fiji
Pacific Games
Gold medal – first place	2007 Samoa	Team
Silver medal – second place	2015 Papua New Guinea	Team
Bronze medal – third place	2019 Samoa	Team

Marques Reid Whippy (born February 5, 1986) is a Fijian former professional basketball player. He played college basketball for Brigham Young University in Hawaii before playing professionally in Spain, Australia, Chile and New Zealand. He has been a regular member of the Fijian national team.

== Early life and college ==
Born in Suva, Fiji, to parents Paul and Olive, Whippy was the third eldest of six children. Despite growing up in a rugby dominated country, Whippy started playing basketball at a young age due to family influence – both his parents played and coached basketball at some level in Fiji. At the age of 14, he represented the country internationally for the first time, and in 2002 he played for Fiji at the Oceania Youth Tournament in Tonga.

Whippy attended LDS Church College in Suva before moving to the United States in 2003, where he spent his last year of secondary school at Woods Cross High School in Woods Cross, Utah. There, he played 4A state basketball.

After serving a two-year Mormon mission with the Church of Jesus Christ of Latter-day Saints, Whippy joined the BYU–Hawaii Seasiders men's basketball team for the 2007–08 season. His size and physical abilities became an instrument for the Seasiders. During his junior year in 2009–10, he was awarded first team all-conference and led his team to the Division II National Championship held in Springfield, Massachusetts. He improved further as a senior in 2010–11 as he earned the Pacific West Player of the Year award and finished his four-year career at BYU–Hawaii with a school-record of 245 steals. In 31 games (30 starts) as a senior, he averaged 14.2 points, 11.5 rebounds, 3.5 assists, 2.8 steals, 1.3 blocks in 31.2 minutes per game.

== Professional career ==
=== Spain ===
In August 2011, Whippy signed a one-year deal with Bàsquet Mallorca of the LEB Oro. In 31 games for Mallorca in 2011–12, he averaged 8.8 points and 5.2 rebounds per game.

=== Australia ===
In April 2012, following the conclusion of the LEB Oro season, Whippy moved to Australia and joined the Brisbane Spartans for the 2012 SEABL season. An ankle injury sidelined him for three weeks during May. In 20 games for Brisbane, he averaged 10.3 points, 8.2 rebounds and 3.0 assists per game.

Whippy returned to Australia in June 2013 and joined the Northside Wizards of the Queensland Basketball League. In his first game for Northside, in round five against the Brisbane Capitals, he recorded 14 rebounds to go with seven points and five assists. He appeared in 14 games for Northside in 2013, averaging 12.6 points, 9.6 rebounds, 3.7 assists and a league-leading 3.1 steals per game.

=== Chile ===
In September 2013, Whippy moved to Chile and joined CD Universidad Católica of the Liga Nacional de Básquetbol de Chile. In 13 regular season games with Católica, Whippy averaged a league-leading 2.8 steals per game. After Católica was knocked out of the playoffs with a 2–1 semi-final series loss to CD Liceo Mixto, Whippy departed Chile in December 2013.

=== New Zealand ===
In January 2014, Whippy signed with the Otago Nuggets for the 2014 New Zealand NBL season. After debuting with 17 rebounds against the Southland Sharks, a ruptured Achilles suffered during training ruled him out for the rest of the season.

On September 29, 2014, Whippy signed with the Canterbury Rams for the 2015 New Zealand NBL season. In 18 games for Canterbury, he averaged 7.8 points, 7.0 rebounds, 2.7 assists and 2.3 steals per game.

In December 2015, Whippy re-signed with the Rams for the 2016 season. He helped the Rams finish the regular season in first place with a 13–5 record. It marked the Rams' first playoff appearance since 2002 and their first regular season title since 1993. In their semi-final match-up with the fourth-seeded Super City Rangers, the Rams were defeated 104–85. He appeared in all 19 games for the Rams in 2016, averaging 9.2 points, 5.5 rebounds, 2.9 assists and 1.9 steals per game.

On October 17, 2016, Whippy re-signed with the Rams for the 2017 season. The Rams finished the regular season in fourth place with a 10–8 record, and lost in the semi-finals to the Wellington Saints. He appeared in all 19 games for the Rams in 2016, averaging 6.4 points, 6.8 rebounds, 3.5 assists and 1.7 steals per game.

In August 2017, Whippy was retained by the Rams for the 2018 season. However, he was re-classed as an import under new league rules, where Oceania players are no longer permitted to play as locals. The Rams opted to move in a different direction with their imports late in pre-season, with Whippy and the Rams controversially parting ways in April 2018.

== National team career ==
Whippy was a member of the Fijian national basketball team in 2004, 2005, 2007, 2009, 2015, 2017 and 2019. He helped Fiji win gold at the 2007 South Pacific Games, silver at the 2015 Pacific Games and bronze at the 2019 Pacific Games.

== Personal ==
Whippy and his wife, Valmene, have two daughters. Whippy plays alongside his brothers, Leonard and Waymann, with the Fijian national team.

Whippy is one of six children to father Paul and mother Olive: older sister Majori, older brother Leonard, younger brother Waymann, and younger twin brothers Jared and Joshua. He also has an adopted sister, Jodie. Both Jared and Joshua attended Brigham Young University (BYU) on rugby scholarships.

Whippy is a basketball coach at Christchurch's Hillmorton High School.
