= Joshua Fox =

Fijian basketball player

Frankston Blues
- Position: Forward
- League: NBL1 South

Personal information
- Born: 2 April 1994 (age 32) Suva, Fiji
- Listed height: 6 ft 6 in (1.98 m)
- Listed weight: 209 lb (95 kg)

Career information
- High school: Sacred Heart Cathedral Preparatory (San Francisco, California)
- College: UC Riverside (2012–2013); CC of San Francisco (2013–2014); UC Davis (2014–2016)
- NBA draft: 2016: undrafted
- Playing career: 2016–present

Career history
- 2016: Cheshire Phoenix
- 2017: Hawke's Bay Hawks
- 2018–2019: Ballarat Miners
- 2020–present: Frankston Blues

Career highlights
- Second-team All-Big West (2016); Big West Sixth Man of the Year (2015); All-Big West Honorable Mention (2015)

Joshua Robert George Fox (born 2 April 1994) is a Fijian professional basketball player for the Frankston Blues of the NBL1 South.

== Early life ==
Fox was born in Suva, Fiji. As a youth, he moved to the United States, where his family settled down in California. They first lived in Los Angeles before moving north to Daly City. Fox attended Sacred Heart Cathedral Preparatory in San Francisco and led the Fightin' Irish to four straight Central Coast Section titles. He earned second team all-league honors as a junior, before receiving first team all-league, all-metro and San Francisco Player of the Year accolades as a senior.

== College career ==
As a freshman at UC Riverside in 2012–13, Fox led the Highlanders in scoring on seven occasions and finished as his team's leading rebounder in 14 games. In 28 games, he averaged 9.3 points, 6.5 rebounds and 1.3 assists per game.

For his sophomore season, Fox transferred to the City College of San Francisco. In 2013–14, he led City College to a regional championship. His Rams squad was ranked No. 1 in the California Community College Athletic Association's poll throughout the season. CCSF won 28 games in a row during the 2013–14 season. Fox averaged 9.0 points and 5.0 rebounds per game, and shot .466 from the floor and .372 from three-point range.

In April 2014, Fox signed a National Letter of Intent to play for UC Davis.

As a junior with the Aggies in 2014–15, Fox earned Big West Sixth Man of the Year honors and was named an All-Big West Honorable Mention selection. He became UC Davis' first-ever Sixth Man of the Year award winner. On 17 January 2015, he came off the bench to score 20 of the Aggies' 37 bench points, on 8 of 11 shooting and was 4 for 7 at the stripe against Cal State Fullerton. In 32 games, he averaged 9.0 points, 4.3 rebounds and 1.1 assists per game.

As a senior with the Aggies in 2015–16, Fox averaged a team-high 14.9 points and 6.8 rebounds per game and led all Aggies with his .514 field goal percentage. When the 2016–17 season ended, Fox held top marks in five different Big West statistical categories. Fox's .544 career field goal percentage and 703 career points are the second-highest figures recorded by a two-year player in the program's Division I era. He was subsequently named second-team All-Big West.

== Professional career ==
In September 2016, Fox signed with the Cheshire Phoenix of the British Basketball League for the 2016–17 season. However, he appeared in just seven games for Cheshire before leaving the team in November 2016.

Upon leaving Cheshire, Fox moved to New Zealand and joined the Hawke's Bay Hawks for the 2017 NBL season. He appeared in all 18 games for the 4–14 Hawks, averaging 12.5 points, 4.7 rebounds and 2.0 assists per game.

In December 2017, Fox signed with the Ballarat Miners for the 2018 SEABL season. He returned to the Miners for the 2019 NBL1 season.

In December 2019, Fox signed with the Frankston Blues for the 2020 NBL1 South season.

== National team career ==
In 2015, Fox helped the Fijian national team win silver at the Pacific Games. In 2023, Fox was a top performer, leading the Fijians to a gold medal finish over Guam at the Pacific Games. In 36 minutes, he finished with 9 points on 4 of 8 shooting, 10 rebounds, and 2 assists. For the 2023 Pacific Games, he averaged a double-double with 14.6 points and 11.4 rebounds.

== Personal ==
Fox is one of four children to Elizabeth Fox. Joyce, Conrad and Emelita are his siblings.
