= Apia Muri =

Papua New Guinean basketball player

Personal information
- Born: May 14, 1988 (age 38)
- Listed height: 6 ft 6 in (1.98 m)

Career information
- Playing career: 2007–present
- Position: Power forward / center

Apia Muri (born May 14, 1988), is a Papua New Guinean professional basketball player. He is one of the country's most prominent basketball figures.

He led Papua New Guinea's national basketball team all the way to the bronze medal match of the 2015 Pacific Games, where he recorded most minutes, points, rebounds and blocks for his team.
