= New Caledonia men's national basketball team =

International representatives

New Caledonia
- FIBA ranking: T-94
- Joined FIBA: 1974
- FIBA zone: FIBA Oceania
- National federation: Région Fédérale de Nouvelle Calédonie de Basketball
- Coach: Benjamin Guy

Oceanian Championship
- Appearances: 1 (1997)
- Medals: Bronze: 1997

Pacific Games
- Medals: Gold: 2003, 2011; Silver: 1966, 1995; Bronze: 1969, 1975, 1999

Oceania Basketball Tournament
- Medals: Gold: 2001, 2005; Silver: 2009
Home	Away

The New Caledonia national basketball team represents New Caledonia in international basketball competitions. It is organized and run by the Région Fédérale de Nouvelle Calédonie de Basketball (New Caledonia Basketball Federation).

Judged by the medals at the Oceania Basketball Tournament, New Caledonia is Oceania's fourth most successful basketball nation (only behind Australia, New Zealand, and Guam and tied with the remaining others in last place).

== Competitive record ==
=== Pacific Games Tournament ===
- 1963 : 5
- 1966 : (silver)
- 1969 : (bronze)
- 1971 : ?
- 1975 : (bronze)
- 1979 : ?
- 1983 : ?
- 1987 : 4th
- 1991 : ?
- 1995 : (silver)
- 1999 : (bronze)
- 2003 : (gold)
- 2007 : 4th
- 2011 : (gold)
- 2015 : 7th
- 2019 : 5th
- 2023 : To be determined

=== FIBA Oceania Championship ===
Year	Position	Tournament	Host
1997	3rd place, bronze medalist(s)	FIBA Oceania Championship 1997	New Zealand

=== Oceania Basketball Tournament ===
- 1981 : ?
- 1985 : ?
- 1989 : ?
- 1993 : ?
- 1997 : ?
- 2001 : (gold)
- 2005 : (gold)
- 2009 : (silver)
- 2013 : ?

=== Melanesian Basketball Cup ===
- 2017 : (silver)
- 2022 : To be determined

== Current roster ==
At the 2019 Pacific Games:

New Caledonia men's national basketball team roster
Players
Coaches

Pos.	No.	Name	Age – Date of birth	Height	Club	Ctr.
PG	4	Jo Delaunay-Belleville	24 – 4 November 1994	1.82 m (6 ft 0 in)	AS 6e KM	(New Caledonia)
SG	5	Ruben Ha Ho	32 – 31 January 1987	1.80 m (5 ft 11 in)	AS Dumbea	(New Caledonia)
PG	6	Karyl Paillandi	33 – 2 March 1986	1.75 m (5 ft 9 in)	AS 6e KM	(New Caledonia)
PF	7	Raymond Weber	30 – 27 July 1988	1.93 m (6 ft 4 in)	AS Dumbea	(New Caledonia)
PF	8	Yann Mathelon	34 – 27 May 1985	1.90 m (6 ft 3 in)	AS Dumbea	(New Caledonia)
PG	9	Alex Ha Ho	29 – 19 April 1990	1.78 m (5 ft 10 in)	AS Dumbea	(New Caledonia)
C	10	Beniela Adjouhgniope	27 – 6 November 1991	1.95 m (6 ft 5 in)	AS Dumbea	(New Caledonia)
SG	11	Steevan Sillant	28 – 24 January 1991	1.86 m (6 ft 1 in)	AS Dumbea	(New Caledonia)
PF	12	Benji Hnawia	39 – 27 April 1980	1.90 m (6 ft 3 in)	AS 6e KM	(New Caledonia)
C	13	Rodrigue Tetainanuari	36 – 15 July 1982	2.03 m (6 ft 8 in)	Aurore de Vitre	(France)
SG	14	Paul Boawe	29 – 3 January 1990	1.82 m (6 ft 0 in)	AS Dumbea	(New Caledonia)
C	15	Flo Patche	18 – 31 October 2000	1.93 m (6 ft 4 in)	AS Dumbea	(New Caledonia)

Head coach

- (New Caledonia) Benjamin Guy

Assistant coach(es)

- (New Caledonia) Christophe David

Legend

- Club – describes last
  club before the competition
- Age – describes age
  on 24 August 2021

=== Depth chart ===
Pos.	Starting 5	Bench 1	Bench 2
C	Rodrigue Tetainanuari	Flo Patche
PF	Beniela Adjouhgniope	Yann Mathelon	Benji Hnawia
SF	Raymond Weber
SG	Steevan Sillant	Paul Boawe	Ruben Ha Ho
PG	Jo Delaunay-Belleville	Alex Ha Ho	Karyl Paillandi

== Head coach position ==
- (New Caledonia) Cyril Metzdorf – 2013–2015
- (New Caledonia) Benjamin Guy – 2019

== Past rosters ==
At the 2015 Pacific Games:

New Caledonia men's national basketball team roster
Players
Coaches

Pos.	No.	Name	Age – Date of birth	Height	Club
	4	Joan Delaunay-Belleville	–
	5	Emmanuel Soeria-Ouamba	–
	6	Karyl Paillandi	–
	7	Ruben Ha-Ho	–
	8	Yann Mathelon	–
	9	Stéphane Saminadin	–
	10	Beniela Adjouhgniope	–
	11	Steeven Sillant	–
F	12	Jean-Jacques Taufana	28 – September 24, 1986	6 ft 1 in (1.85 m)
	13	Rodrigue Tetainanuarii	–
	14	Cédric Tetuanui	–
	15	Sébastien Hnawia	–

Head coach

- (New Caledonia) Cyril Metzdorf

Legend

- Club – describes last
  club before the tournament
- Age – describes age
  on 20 August 2015

== Kit ==
=== Manufacturer ===
2019: owayo GmbH

== See also ==
- New Caledonia women's national basketball team
- New Caledonia national under-19 basketball team
- New Caledonia national under-17 basketball team
- New Caledonia national 3x3 team
