= Vanuatu women's national basketball team =

Vanuatu
- FIBA ranking: NR (14 September 2026)
- Joined FIBA: 1966
- FIBA zone: FIBA Oceania
- National federation: Vanuatu Amateur Basketball Federation
- Coach: ?

FIBA Oceania Championship for Women
- Appearances: ?
- Medals: None

Pacific Games
- Appearances: ?
- Medals: None
Home	Away

The Vanuatu women's national basketball team is the side that represents Vanuatu in international basketball competitions for women. It is administered by the Vanuatu Amateur Basketball Federation.

The team appeared at the 1981 Oceania Basketball Tournament for Women and the 2011 Pacific Games.
