= New Caledonia women's national basketball team =

New Caledonia
- FIBA ranking: NR (14 September 2026)
- Joined FIBA: 1974
- FIBA zone: FIBA Oceania
- National federation: Région Fédérale de Nouvelle Calédonie de Basketball

FIBA Oceania Championship for Women
- Appearances: 1
- Medals: (bronze) Bronze: 1997
| Home | Away |

The New Caledonia women's national basketball team is the women's national basketball team of New Caledonia. It is managed by the Région Fédérale de Nouvelle Calédonie de Basketball.

The team has won several medals at the Pacific Games.

== See also ==
- New Caledonia women's national under-19 basketball team
- New Caledonia women's national under-17 basketball team
- New Caledonia women's national 3x3 team
