= Solomon Islands men's national basketball team =

Solomon Islands
- FIBA ranking: 155 ▼3 (1 September 2026)
- Joined FIBA: 1987
- FIBA zone: FIBA Oceania
- National federation: Solomon Islands Amateur Basketball Federation
- Coach: Eric Malcolm

Oceanian Championship
- Appearances: None

Pacific Games
- Appearances: 2
- Medals: None

Oceania Basketball Tournament
- Appearances: None
- Medals: None

The Solomon Islands national basketball team is the team that represents the Solomon Islands in international basketball and is a member of FIBA Oceania.

== Competitions ==
=== FIBA Melanesia Basketball Cup ===
Year	Position	Tournament	Host
2017	4th	2017 FIBA Melanesia Basketball Cup	Port Moresby, Papua New Guinea
