= FIBA U17 Oceania Cup =

Under-17 continental basketball championship

- Most recent season or competition: 2025 FIBA U17 Oceania Cup
- Sport: Basketball
- Founded: 2006; 20 years ago
- Organizing body: FIBA Oceania
- Continent: Oceania
- Most recent champions: New Zealand (2nd title)
- Most titles: Australia (8 titles)
- Qualification: FIBA U18 Asia Cup
- Related competitions: FIBA U15 Oceania Cup
- Website: www.fiba.basketball/history

The FIBA U17 Oceania Cup, formerly known as the FIBA Under-17 Oceania Championship, is an international junior men's basketball tournament in the FIBA Oceania zone, inaugurated in 2006. The current champions are New Zealand.

Before 2017, the competition was known as the FIBA Oceania Under-18 Championship, which was a qualifier for the FIBA U19 World Cup. Now it's an under-17 competition for Oceanian teams to qualify for the FIBA U18 Asia Cup (from which they can qualify for the World Cup).

== Summary ==
=== Under-18 era ===
Year	Hosts	Final			Third place match		
Year	Hosts	Champions	Score	Runners-up	Third place	Score	Fourth place
2006; Details	(Australia); Sydney	Australia	2–0; 78–55; 112–50	New Zealand	No other teams competed		
2008; Details	(Australia); Adelaide	Australia	3–0; 94–67; 84–71; 81–60	New Zealand	No other teams competed		
2010; Details	(New Zealand); Palmerston North	Australia	3–0; 109–82; 107–51; 94–46	New Zealand	No other teams competed		
2012; Details	(New Zealand); Porirua	Australia	3–0; 85–64; 95–70; 93–60	New Zealand	No other teams competed		
2014; Details	(Fiji); Suva	Australia	84–81	New Zealand	New Caledonia	63–56	Tahiti
2016; Details	(Fiji); Suva	New Zealand	57–51	Australia	Guam	87–68	New Caledonia

=== Under-17 era ===
Year	Hosts	Final			Third place match		
Year	Hosts	Champions	Score	Runners-up	Third place	Score	Fourth place
2017; Details	(Guam); Hagåtña	Australia	93–55	New Zealand	Guam	105–70	Samoa
2019; Details	(New Caledonia); Nouméa	Australia	85–56	New Zealand	Samoa	87–59	Tahiti
2021	Cancelled due to COVID-19 pandemic in Oceania						
2023; Details	(Papua New Guinea); Port Moresby	Australia	96–49	New Zealand	Samoa	132–63	Guam
2025; Details	(Samoa); Apia	New Zealand	82–62	Australia	Samoa	84–78	Guam

== Medal table ==
Rank	Nation	Gold	Silver	Bronze	Total
1	Australia	8	2	0	10
2	New Zealand	2	8	0	10
3	Samoa	0	0	3	3
4	Guam	0	0	2	2
5	New Caledonia	0	0	1	1
Totals (5 entries)		10	10	6	26

== Participation details ==
Team	(Australia) 2006	(Australia) 2008	(New Zealand) 2010	(New Zealand) 2012	(Fiji) 2014	(Fiji) 2016	(Australia) 2017	(New Caledonia) 2019	(Papua New Guinea) 2023	(Samoa) 2025	Total
American Samoa					8th						1
Australia	1st	1st	1st	1st	1st	2nd	1st	1st	1st	2nd	10
Cook Islands								8th		6th	2
Fiji					7th	6th				5th	3
Guam					5th	3rd	3rd	5th	4th	4th	6
Marshall Islands							8th				1
New Caledonia					3rd	4th	6th	6th			4
New Zealand	2nd	2nd	2nd	2nd	2nd	1st	2nd	2nd	2nd	1st	10
Palau							7th				1
Papua New Guinea					9th			7th	5th		3
Samoa					6th	5th	4th	3rd	3rd	3rd	6
Solomon Islands					10th						1
Tahiti					4th	7th	5th	4th			4
Total	2	2	2	2	10	7	8	8	5	6	
