= Kody Stattmann =

Australian basketball player (born 2000)

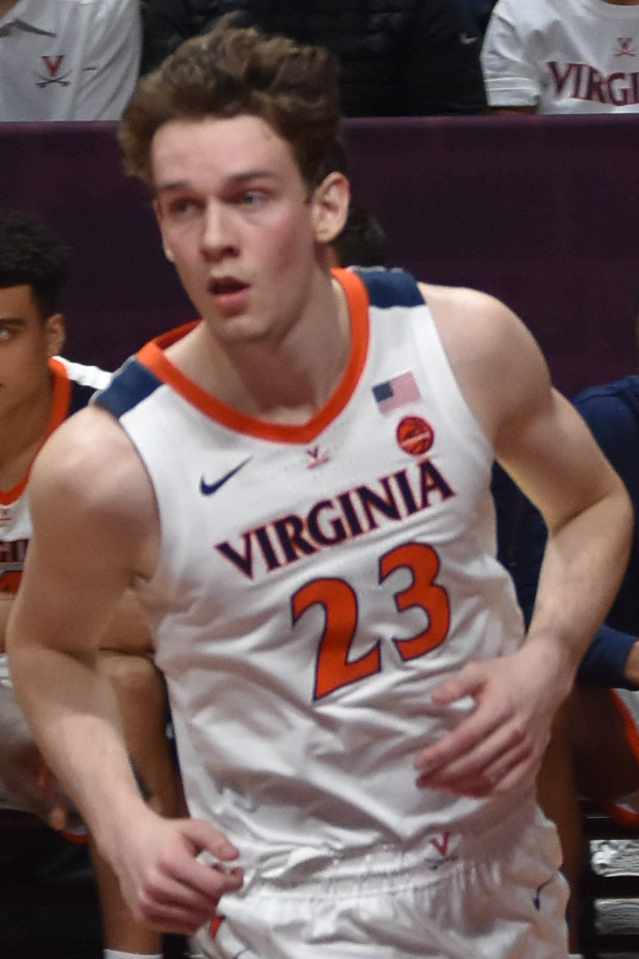
- Stattmann with Virginia in 2020

No. 6 – Tasmania JackJumpers
- Position: Point guard / shooting guard
- League: NBL

Personal information
- Born: 9 June 2000 (age 26) Cairns, Queensland, Australia
- Listed height: 202 cm (6 ft 8 in)
- Listed weight: 91 kg (201 lb)

Career information
- High school: St Augustine's College (Cairns, Queensland)
- College: Virginia (2018–2022)
- NBA draft: 2022: undrafted
- Playing career: 2017–present

Career history
- 2017: Cairns Marlins
- 2018: BA Centre of Excellence
- 2022: Cairns Marlins
- 2022–2023: Brisbane Bullets
- 2023: North Gold Coast Seahawks
- 2023–2024: South East Melbourne Phoenix
- 2024–2026: Cairns Marlins
- 2024–2026: Cairns Taipans
- 2026–present: Tasmania JackJumpers

Career highlights
- NBL1 North Most Valuable Player (2026); NBL1 North First Team (2026); NBL1 North Second Team (2024); NCAA champion (2019)

Kody Wade Stattmann (born 9 June 2000) is an Australian professional basketball player for the Tasmania JackJumpers of the National Basketball League (NBL). He played four years of college basketball in the United States for the Virginia Cavaliers, where he won an NCAA championship as a freshman in 2019. In 2022, he returned to Australia and debuted in the NBL for the Brisbane Bullets, where he spent one season before joining the South East Melbourne Phoenix in 2023. In 2024, he joined the Cairns Taipans. In 2026, he was named NBL1 North Most Valuable Player as a member of the Cairns Marlins.

== Early life and career ==
Stattmann was born and raised in Cairns, Queensland. As a child, he enjoyed motocross, rode motorbikes and was a fan of Travis Pastrana. He was also a fan of the Geelong Cats and Gary Ablett Jr. in the Australian Football League, and regularly attended Cairns Taipans NBL games.

Stattmann grew up playing for Cairns Basketball, where he worked his way into the Cairns Marlins rotation at the age of 17, debuting in the Queensland Basketball League (QBL) in 2017. In 10 games during the 2017 QBL season, he averaged 4.5 points, 1.8 rebounds and 1.0 assists per game. He attended St Augustine's College in Cairns.

In August 2017, Stattmann committed to play college basketball with the Virginia Cavaliers. He signed with Virginia three months later.

In 2018, Stattmann played one game for the BA Centre of Excellence in the South East Australian Basketball League (SEABL).

== College career ==
In July 2018, Stattmann moved to the United States. He debuted for the Virginia Cavaliers in the 2018–19 season, playing in 18 games and averaging 1.7 points in 4.1 minutes as a freshman. At the 2019 NCAA tournament, the Cavaliers won the NCAA championship. Despite not receiving any court time, Stattmann became just the second Australian to win an NCAA championship.

As a sophomore in 2019–20, Stattmann started 10 of 24 games and averaged 3.6 points and 2.4 rebounds in 21.5 minutes per game. He missed four games due to illness and two games with a concussion. He scored 10 points and grabbed a career-high eight rebounds against Virginia Tech on 4 January 2020. Three days later, he scored a career-high 11 points with seven rebounds against Boston College.

As a junior in 2020–21, Stattmann was sidelined for 15 games due to a non-COVID-19 related cardiac issue. He managed four games, averaging 3.5 points and 1.8 rebounds.

As a senior in 2021–22, Stattmann played 35 games with one start, averaging 3.3 points and 1.7 rebounds in 15.8 minutes per game. He tied his career high of 11 points twice during the season.

== Professional career ==
In June 2022, Stattmann joined the Cairns Marlins of the NBL1 North for the rest of the 2022 NBL1 season. In 12 games, he averaged 15.0 points, 7.1 rebounds, 1.3 assists and 1.2 steals per game.

Following the NBL1 season, Stattmann joined the Brisbane Bullets of the National Basketball League (NBL) as a fully rostered player for the 2022–23 season. On 17 November 2022, he was ruled out for six weeks with an ankle injury. In 19 games, he averaged 1.5 points per game.

In March 2023, Stattmann signed with the North Gold Coast Seahawks for the 2023 NBL1 North season. In 18 games, he averaged 14.4 points, 6.4 rebounds, 2.3 assists and 1.4 steals per game.

On 28 July 2023, Stattmann signed with the South East Melbourne Phoenix as a development player for the 2023–24 NBL season. After waiting until late in the season for an opportunity, he registered over 10 minutes per game in eight of nine of the Phoenix's final games, during which he recorded his best NBL performance of 16 points and six rebounds against the Sydney Kings in round 17. In 16 games, he averaged 3.6 points and 1.6 rebounds per game.

Stattmann re-joined the Cairns Marlins for the 2024 NBL1 North season to play alongside his brother, Ky. On 21 June 2024, he scored 43 points in a 98–85 win over the South West Metro Pirates. In 15 games, he averaged 27.5 points, 6.1 rebounds, 2.2 assists and 1.5 steals per game. He was named to the NBL1 North Second Team.

On 11 July 2024, Stattmann signed a two-year deal with the Cairns Taipans, the first year as a development player before being elevated to the main roster for the second year. He appeared in just three games during the 2024–25 NBL season.

Stattmann re-joined the Marlins for the 2025 NBL1 North season. On 26 July 2025, he scored 48 points in a 138–108 win over the Townsville Heat. In 14 games, he averaged 24.9 points, 8.0 rebounds, 3.0 assists and 1.8 steals per game.

Entering the 2025–26 NBL season as a fully rostered player, Stattmann filled the Taipans' point guard position during pre-season. In round six, he suffered a right hamstring injury that sidelined him until round 11. On 30 January 2026, while stepping up to cover the absence of import Andrew Andrews, Stattmann scored a career-high 18 points in a 96–93 overtime win over the Tasmania JackJumpers. He had seven points and two steals in the overtime period.

Stattmann re-joined the Marlins for the 2026 NBL1 North season. On 30 May 2026, he scored 45 points against the Gold Coast Rollers. He helped the Marlins finish the regular season with a 16–0 record, becoming the first NBL1 Men's side to go undefeated in a regular season. He was subsequently named NBL1 North Most Valuable Player and earned NBL1 North All Star Five First Team honours. For the season, he averaged 24.7 points, 7 rebounds, 2.7 assists and 1.5 steals per game.

On 30 September 2026, Stattmann signed with the Tasmania JackJumpers as an injury replacement for Anthony Drmic. On 15 October, he was elevated to the full-time roster following Drmic's retirement. On 15 November, he had a career-best performance with 28 points, five rebounds, two assists and two steals with 6/11 three-point shooting in a 104–92 win over the Brisbane Bullets.

== National team career ==
Stattmann played for the Australian Crocs at the 2016 FIBA Under-17 World Championship, where he averaged 3.7 points in seven games. With the Australian Emus at the 2017 FIBA Under-17 Oceania Championship, he averaged 31 points to lead the Emus to the gold medal while earning all-star honours as the highest point scorer. At the 2018 FIBA U18 Asian Championship, he averaged 12.8 points in six games for the Emus. At the 2019 FIBA Under-19 Basketball World Cup, he averaged 10.3 points in seven games for the Emus.

In February 2026, Stattmann was named in the Australian Boomers squad for two FIBA World Cup Asian qualifiers.

== Personal life ==
Stattmann is the son of Darryll and Tonya Stattmann. He has one younger brother, Ky. His mother and aunt both played for the Cairns Dolphins. His great aunt, Rayleen Lynch, was the first Queenslander to represent Australia in basketball.
