= 2017 FIBA Under-17 Oceania Championship =

1st Oceanian U17 Basketball Championship

Tournament details
- Host country: Guam
- City: Hagåtña
- Dates: 10–15 July 2017
- Teams: 8 (from 1 confederation)
- Venues: 2 (in 1 host city)

Final positions
- Champions: Australia (6th title)
- Runners-up: New Zealand
- Third place: Guam

Tournament statistics
- MVP: (Australia) Sam Froling
- Top scorer: (Australia) Kody Stattmann (31.0)
- Top rebounds: (New Caledonia) Melvin Ixoee (13.3)
- Top assists: (Australia) Sean Macdonald (6.4)
- PPG (Team): Australia (142.6)
- RPG (Team): Australia (56.2)
- APG (Team): Australia (32.4)

Official website
- 2017 FIBA U-17 Oceania Championship

The 2017 FIBA Under-17 Oceania Championship was an international under-17 basketball tournament held from 10 to 15 July 2017 by FIBA Oceania in Hagåtña, Guam. Australia defeated New Zealand in the Finals, 93–55, to take the gold medal and their sixth consecutive U17 title. Both teams qualified for the 2018 FIBA U18 Asian Championship which in turn was the qualifying tournament for the 2019 FIBA Under-19 Basketball World Cup.

== Hosts selection ==
On 23 September 2016, FIBA Oceania announced during their Board Meeting that Guam will host the tournament. The Calvo Field House of the University of Guam in Hagåtña will be the main venue for the championship.

== Participating teams ==
On 13 April 2017, the following teams confirmed their participation to the main tournament:

- Australia
- New Zealand
- Guam
- Palau
- Marshall Islands
- Western Samoa
- New Caledonia
- Tahiti

== Draw ==
On 12 May 2017, the draw for the main tournament was held in Hagåtña, Guam.

== Group phase ==
All times are in Chamorro Time Zone (UTC+10:00)

=== Group A ===
Pos	Team	Pld	W	L	PF	PA	PD	Pts	Qualification
1	New Zealand	3	3	0	321	147	+174	6	Advance to Semifinals
2	Guam (H)	3	2	1	347	198	+149	5	Advance to Semifinals
3	Tahiti	3	1	2	207	260	−53	4	Advance to Division B Gold Medal Game
4	Marshall Islands	3	0	3	103	373	−270	3	Advance to Division B Bronze Medal Game

Source: FIBA
(H) Hosts

10 July
15:00

Box Scores

New Zealand	106–36	Tahiti
Scoring by quarter: 30–11, 22–9, 30–6, 24–10
Pts: de Geest 21; Rebs: de Geest 10; Asts: O'Connell, Boyce-Towler 2		Pts: Sarciaux 8 Rebs: Roopina 4 Asts: Roy, Sarciaux 1

Calvo Field House, University of Guam, Mangilao

10 July
19:00

Box Scores

Marshall Islands	34–151	Guam
Scoring by quarter: 2–47, 19–30, 2–43, 11–31
Pts: D. Maddison 9 Rebs: Tomeing 6 Asts: J. Kattil 3		Pts: Diaz, Gaitan 22; Rebs: Tisalona 9 Asts: Grape 7

Calvo Field House, University of Guam, Mangilao

11 July
11:00

Box Scores

Tahiti	97–36	Marshall Islands
Scoring by quarter: 26–10, 17–3, 29–12, 25–11
Pts: Thunot 16; Rebs: Sarciaux 12; Asts: Thunot 4		Pts: Dribo 8 Rebs: Tomeing 9 Asts: Hiram 4

Calvo Field House, University of Guam, Mangilao

11 July
17:00

Box Scores

Guam	78–90	New Zealand
Scoring by quarter: 19–16, 24–26, 17–23, 18–25
Pts: Simon 22; Rebs: Diaz 6 Asts: Grape 5		Pts: Faamausili 15; Rebs: Higgins 12; Asts: Boyce-Towler 3

Calvo Field House, University of Guam, Mangilao

12 July
17:00

Box Scores

Guam	118–74	Tahiti
Scoring by quarter: 25–17, 39–19, 28–14, 26–24
Pts: Simon 17; Rebs: Gaitan 11; Asts: Grape 7		Pts: Teore 31; Rebs: Perez 9 Asts: Thunot 2

Calvo Field House, University of Guam, Mangilao

12 July
20:00

Box Scores

New Zealand	125–33	Marshall Islands
Scoring by quarter: 26–10, 30–10, 41–11, 28–2
Pts: de Geest 19; Rebs: Osward 10; Asts: Robertson 6		Pts: Stovall 11; Rebs: Tomeing 6 Asts: Kattil 3

Father Dueñas Memorial School, Mangilao

=== Group B ===
Pos	Team	Pld	W	L	PF	PA	PD	Pts	Qualification
1	Australia	3	3	0	465	98	+367	6	Advance to Semifinals
2	Samoa	3	2	1	242	254	−12	5	Advance to Semifinals
3	New Caledonia	3	1	2	161	278	−117	4	Advance to Division B Gold Medal Game
4	Palau	3	0	3	121	359	−238	3	Advance to Division B Bronze Medal Game

Source: FIBA

10 July
09:00

Box Scores

Australia	155–32	New Caledonia
Scoring by quarter: 49–6, 36–6, 32–4, 38–16
Pts: Stattmann 33; Rebs: Froling 8 Asts: Macdonald 9		Pts: Patche 10; Rebs: Taputai 6 Asts: Abouab 2

Calvo Field House, University of Guam, Mangilao

10 July
11:00

Box Scores

Palau	48–126	Samoa
Scoring by quarter: 12–23, 10–37, 16–40, 10–26
Pts: Sungino 12; Rebs: Timarong, Reklai 6 Asts: Kingzio 3		Pts: Tautau 25; Rebs: Aiono 14; Asts: Hirawani 8

Calvo Field House, University of Guam, Mangilao

11 July
15:00

Box Scores

Samoa	82–64	New Caledonia
Scoring by quarter: 16–18, 19–16, 21–15, 26–15
Pts: Leusogi Ape 22; Rebs: Aiono 16; Asts: Leusogi Ape 4		Pts: Rambans 19; Rebs: Patche 13; Asts: Patche 4

Calvo Field House, University of Guam, Mangilao

11 July
18:00

Box Scores

Palau	32–168	Australia
Scoring by quarter: 14–49, 4–42, 6–37, 8–40
Pts: Sungino, Reklai 13; Rebs: Sungino 3 Asts: 0		Pts: Stattmann 35; Rebs: Gatbel 12; Asts: Robertson 7

Father Dueñas Memorial School, Mangilao

12 July
09:00

Box Scores

New Caledonia	65–41	Palau
Scoring by quarter: 14–14, 15–6, 20–8, 16–13
Pts: Ixoee 18; Rebs: Ixoee 27; Asts: Chevrin 3		Pts: Reklai 17; Rebs: Timarong 12; Asts: Timarong 3

Calvo Field House, University of Guam, Mangilao

12 July
15:00

Box Scores

Australia	142–34	Samoa
Scoring by quarter: 30–15, 32–8, 25–9, 55–2
Pts: Stattmann 38; Rebs: Froling 15; Asts: Macdonald 8		Pts: Leusogi Ape 13; Rebs: Tautau 8 Asts: Leusogi Ape 3

Calvo Field House, University of Guam, Mangilao

== Final phase ==
=== Division B ===
==== Bronze-medal game ====
13 July
15:00

Box Scores

Palau	62–50	Marshall Islands
Scoring by quarter: 17–6, 8–13, 21–16, 16–15
Pts: Timarong 17; Rebs: Timarong 26; Asts: Sungino 3		Pts: Dribo 21; Rebs: J. Kattil 8 Asts: 5 players 2

Calvo Field House, University of Guam, Mangilao

==== Gold-medal game ====
13 July
19:00

Box Scores

Tahiti	77–70	New Caledonia
Scoring by quarter: 11–13, 22–17, 29–22, 15–18
Pts: Teore 22; Rebs: Wang 8 Asts: Wang 4		Pts: Ixoee, Chevrin 16; Rebs: Ixoee 17; Asts: Patche 8

Calvo Field House, University of Guam, Mangilao

=== Division A ===
Semifinals
14 July
New Zealand	96
Samoa	58
14 July
Australia	155
Guam	39

Final
15 July
New Zealand	55
Australia	93
3rd place
15 July
Samoa	70
Guam	105

==== Semifinals ====
14 July
15:00

Box Scores

New Zealand	96–58	Samoa
Scoring by quarter: 22–16, 20–18, 32–8, 22–16
Pts: de Geest 19; Rebs: Oswald 12; Asts: Perrott-Hunt 5		Pts: Tautau 20; Rebs: Tautau 16; Asts: Hirawani, Talamaivao 2

Calvo Field House, University of Guam, Mangilao

14 July
19:00

Box Scores

Australia	155–39	Guam
Scoring by quarter: 42–12, 46–7, 38–16, 29–4
Pts: Bowen 36; Rebs: 5 players 8 Asts: Robertson 6		Pts: Simon 9 Rebs: Soriano, White, Gaitan 3 Asts: Gaitan 2

Calvo Field House, University of Guam, Mangilao

==== Bronze-medal game ====
15 July
14:00

Box Scores

Samoa	70–105	Guam
Scoring by quarter: 20–32, 19–27, 12–21, 19–25
Pts: Tautau 21; Rebs: Aiono 10; Asts: Leusogi Ape 6		Pts: Gaitan 25; Rebs: Simon 7 Asts: Calvo, White 4

Calvo Field House, University of Guam, Mangilao

==== Gold-medal game ====
15 July
19:00

Box Scores

New Zealand	55–93	Australia
Scoring by quarter: 15–23, 11–25, 13–25, 16–20
Pts: Oswald 20; Rebs: Oswald 6 Asts: Ahie 3		Pts: Stattmann 23; Rebs: Froling 13; Asts: Macdonald 4

Calvo Field House, University of Guam, Mangilao

== Final standings ==
=== Division A ===
#	Team
1st place, gold medalist(s)	Australia
2nd place, silver medalist(s)	New Zealand
3rd place, bronze medalist(s)	Guam
4th	Samoa

=== Division B ===
#	Team
1st place, gold medalist(s)	Tahiti
2nd place, silver medalist(s)	New Caledonia
3rd place, bronze medalist(s)	Palau
4th	Marshall Islands
