= Rayleen =

Rayleen is a given name. Notable people with the name include:

- Rayleen Lynch (born c. 1946), Australian basketball player

== See also ==
- Raylee
