= Kyle Zunic =

Australian basketball player

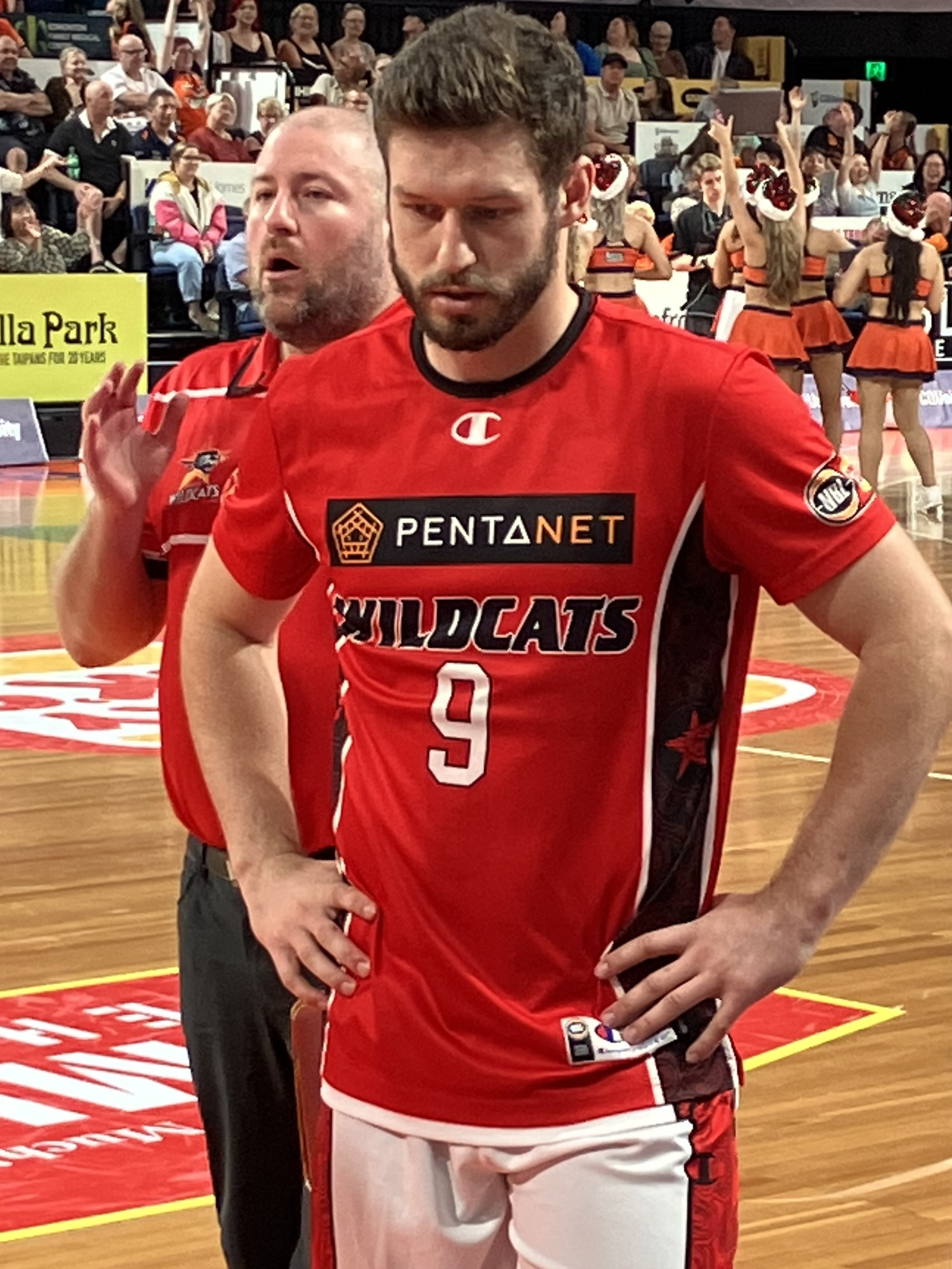
- Zunic with the Perth Wildcats in 2022

Free agent
- Position: Point guard / shooting guard

Personal information
- Born: 4 March 1999 (age 27) Sydney, New South Wales, Australia
- Listed height: 188 cm (6 ft 2 in)
- Listed weight: 90 kg (198 lb)

Career information
- High school: Lake Ginninderra (Canberra, ACT)
- College: Winthrop (2017–2021)
- NBA draft: 2021: undrafted
- Playing career: 2016–present

Career history
- 2016–2017: BA Centre of Excellence
- 2021: USC Rip City
- 2021–2024: Perth Wildcats
- 2022: Warwick Senators
- 2023: Northside Wizards
- 2024: Keilor Thunder
Medals
Men's basketball
Representing Australia
Universiade
Bronze medal – third place	2019 Italy	Team

Kyle Luke Zunic (born 4 March 1999) is an Australian professional basketball player who last played for the Keilor Thunder of the NBL1 South. He played four seasons of college basketball in the United States for the Winthrop Eagles before joining the Perth Wildcats of the National Basketball League (NBL) in 2021.

== Early life and career ==
Zunic was born in Sydney, New South Wales, in the southern suburb of Kogarah. His family later moved to Sanctuary Point, where he attended Sanctuary Point Public School. Around 10 and 11 years old, he played rugby league. He started playing basketball in Shellharbour before moving to Wollongong to play representative basketball for the Illawarra Hawks. He played for NSW Country at national tournaments.

Zunic moved to Canberra to attend the Australian Institute of Sport and Lake Ginninderra College. He played for the BA Centre of Excellence in the South East Australian Basketball League (SEABL) in 2016 and 2017, averaging 8.0 points in his first season and 16.3 points in his second season.

== College career ==
In April 2017, Zunic signed a National Letter of Intent to play college basketball for Winthrop University in the United States.

As a freshman for the Winthrop Eagles in 2017–18, Zunic played 26 games with nine starts and averaged 6.8 points, 1.3 rebounds and 1.3 assists in 18.8 minutes per game. He missed games with injuries to his ankles and appendix issues.

As a sophomore in 2018–19, Zunic averaged career highs in points (8.6), rebounds (4.3), assists (1.9) and minutes (21.8). He played 30 games and made 18 starts. On 20 December 2018, he had a career-high 21 points and 10 rebounds against UMES.

As a junior in 2019–20, Zunic was named to the Big South Conference All-Academic Team and helped the Eagles win the Big South Conference tournament. He played 32 games with seven starts and averaged 5.5 points, 3.0 rebounds and 1.9 assists in 18.7 minutes per game. He became the 24th player in program history to hit 100 career 3-pointers.

As a senior in 2020–21, Zunic was again named to the Big South Conference All-Academic Team and helped the Eagles win the Big South Conference tournament for the second year in a row. He played 25 games with a career-high 24 starts and averaged 5.0 points, 2.6 rebounds and 1.4 assists in 19.6 minutes per game.

=== College statistics ===
Year	Team	GP	GS	MPG	FG%	3P%	FT%	RPG	APG	SPG	BPG	PPG
2017–18	Winthrop	26	9	18.8	.428	.372	.759	1.3	1.3	.6	.1	6.8
2018–19	Winthrop	30	18	21.8	.405	.324	.667	4.3	1.9	.7	.2	8.6
2019–20	Winthrop	32	7	18.7	.393	.309	.759	3.0	1.9	.5	.1	5.5
2020–21	Winthrop	25	24	19.6	.359	.341	.609	2.6	1.4	.8	.1	5.0
Career		113	58	19.7	.399	.335	.705	2.9	1.6	.6	.1	6.5

== Professional career ==
In June 2021, Zunic joined the USC Rip City of the NBL1 North. In 12 games to finish the 2021 NBL1 season, he averaged 12.91 points, 6.33 rebounds, 5.08 assists and 1.16 steals per game.

On 6 September 2021, Zunic signed with the Perth Wildcats of the National Basketball League (NBL) as a development player for the 2021–22 season. He made his NBL debut on 3 December 2021, scoring two points in 17½ minutes as a starter in the Wildcats' 85–73 season-opening win over the Adelaide 36ers. He became the first development player in NBL history to earn a start in his debut. In 16 games, he averaged 1.7 points and 1.3 rebounds per game.

Zunic joined the Warwick Senators of the NBL1 West for the 2022 season. In 18 games, he averaged 17.78 points, 4.78 rebounds, 4.28 assists and 1.56 steals per game.

On 24 May 2022, Zunic was elevated to the Wildcats' main roster on a two-year deal. He appeared in 14 games during the 2022–23 NBL season, averaging 1.6 points per game.

Zunic joined the Northside Wizards for the 2023 NBL1 North season. In 14 games, he averaged 15.7 points, 3.9 rebounds, 7.4 assists and 2.43 steals per game.

Zunic missed the first three weeks of the 2023–24 NBL season due to a foot injury. He appeared in 10 games for the Wildcats in 2023–24, scoring eight total points. He earned his second straight Perth Wildcats Coaches Award.

On 21 March 2024, Zunic signed with the Keilor Thunder of the NBL1 South for the 2024 season. In 18 games, he averaged 18.22 points, 6.11 rebounds, 6.11 assists and 1.5 steals per game.

== National team career ==
In 2015, Zunic helped the Australian under-16 team win gold at the FIBA Oceania Under-16 Championship in New Zealand.

In 2016, Zunic represented Australia at the FIBA Under-17 World Championship in Spain. That same year, he won silver with the Australian under-19 team at the FIBA Oceania Under-18 Championship in Fiji. He also competed at the Albert Schweitzer Tournament in Germany.

In 2019, Zunic helped the Australian University National Team win bronze at the World University Games in Italy. He recorded a team-high four assists in the bronze medal game against Israel.

In February 2022, Zunic was named in the Australian Boomers squad for the FIBA World Cup Qualifiers in Japan.

== Personal life ==
Zunic is the son of Zoran and Tania Zunic. His father played in the NBL for the Sydney Supersonics (1983) and Sydney Kings (1988). His brother, Jordan, is a professional golfer.
