= 2026 Fiba U18 Asia Cup EABA Qualifier =

FIBA Asia U18 Qualifier

The 2026 Fiba U18 Asia Cup EABA Qualifier was an Under-18 men's basketball tournament, a qualifier of 2026 FIBA U18 Asia Cup, held in Fukuoka, Japan, from 2 to 7 June 2026. This was a round-robin tournament.

4 of the 5 participating teams qualified because

- The default berths of East Asia was 2.
- There were 2 East Asian teams among the top 3 Asia teams in 2024 FIBA U18 Asia Cup.
- No host of 2026.
- No defending champion.

Participating teams:Japan, China, South Korea, Chinese Taipei, Hong Kong

Qualified Teams: China, South Korea, Japan, Chinese Taipei

== Schedule and results ==
Pos	Team	Pld	W	L	PF	PA	PD	Pts	Qualification
1	China	4	3	1	326	265	+61	7	2026 FIBA U18 Asia Cup
2	South Korea	4	3	1	365	301	+64	7	2026 FIBA U18 Asia Cup
3	Japan	4	3	1	334	260	+74	7	2026 FIBA U18 Asia Cup
4	Chinese Taipei	4	1	3	339	373	−34	5	2026 FIBA U18 Asia Cup
5	Hong Kong	4	0	4	250	415	−165	4	

Source: FIBA U18 アジアカップ 2026 東アジア地区予選 特設サイト
Rules for classification: 1) Points (Pts in this table); 2) Head-to-head results; 3) Head-to-head points difference; 4) Head-to-head points scored; 5) Points difference in group (PD in this table); 6) Points scored in group (PF in this table); 7) Draw

2 June
11:00

Boxscore (Archived)

Chinese Taipei	70–80	China
Scoring by quarter: 23–25, 11–25, 11–11, 25–19
Pts: Shao-En Huang 14; Rebs: Yu-Sheng Xing 9 Asts: You-Cheng Jhou 6		Pts: Boxin Zhao 18; Rebs: Boxin Zhao 11; Asts: Zichao Wang 6

Fukuoka Daiichi High School
Referees: Haruga Iwai, Bohui Kim, Ho Ming Chan

2 June
15:00

Boxscore (Archived)

Hong Kong	56–115	South Korea
Scoring by quarter: 21–25, 12–24, 18–36, 5–30
Pts: Ka Lok Mat 11; Rebs: Yuxuan Xiao 7 Asts: Ching Kit Tsang 3		Pts: Jiwon Yoon 24; Rebs: Sungmin Eom 18; Asts: Jihoon Yoon 12

Fukuoka Daiichi High School
Referees: Yimiao Sun, Tzung-Ting Tsai, YUSUKE Ichikawa

3 June
11:00

Boxscore (Archived)

South Korea	87–84	Chinese Taipei
Scoring by quarter: 26–16, 18–31, 18–23, 25–14
Pts: Jihoon Yoon 20; Rebs: Jiwon Yoon 12; Asts: Jihoon Yoon 8		Pts: Ting-Kuan Liu 18; Rebs: Yu-Sheng Xing 11; Asts: Ting-Kuan Liu 7

Fukuoka Daiichi High School
Referees: HARUGA Iwai, Ho Ming Chan, YUSUKE Ichikawa

3 June
15:00

Boxscore (Archived)

Japan	93–45	Hong Kong
Scoring by quarter: 26–8, 24–10, 23–12, 20–15
Pts: Hiroto Kuga 22; Rebs: Chusonjakku Shiratani 8 Asts: Shunsuke Miyazato 7		Pts: Cheuk Wing Chan 10; Rebs: Cheuk Wing Chan 9 Asts: Kam Chuen Yeung 3

Fukuoka Daiichi High School
Referees: Yimiao Sun, Bohui Kim, Tzung-Ting Tsai

4 June
11:00

Boxscore (Archived)

Hong Kong	52–98	China
Scoring by quarter: 10–28, 16–30, 11–23, 15–17
Pts: Ka Lok Mat 10; Rebs: Ching Kit Tsang 7 Asts: Cheuk Wing Chan 4		Pts: Junxian Li 19; Rebs: Jianhao Huang 12; Asts: Yuxiu Chen 6

Fukuoka Daiichi High School
Referees: Yusuke Ichikawa, Haruga Iwai, Bohui Kim

4 June
15:00

Boxscore (Archived)

South Korea	83–69	Japan
Scoring by quarter: 19–14, 18–17, 20–14, 26–24
Pts: Jiwon Yoon 24; Rebs: Jiwon Yoon 7 Asts: Jihoo Eom 4		Pts: Roi Honda 21; Rebs: Alex (Hiro) Mcmillian 13; Asts: Shunsuke Miyazato 4

Fukuoka Daiichi High School
Referees: Ho Ming Chan, Yimiao Sun, Tzung-Ting Tsai

6 June
10:00

Boxscore (Archived)

South Korea	80–92	China
Scoring by quarter: 20–18, 22–27, 18–23, 20–24
Pts: Jiwon Yoon 31; Rebs: Jiwon Yoon 6 Asts: Jihoon Yoon 8		Pts: Keyu Yao 20; Rebs: Two players 9 (Yizhaojie Zhang, Junxian Li); Asts: Yuxiu Chen 7

Fukuoka Daiichi High School
Referees: HARUGA Iwai, YUSUKE Ichikawa, Tzung-Ting Tsai

6 June
14:00

Boxscore (Archived)

Japan	109–76	Chinese Taipei
Scoring by quarter: 33–27, 20–23, 32–13, 24–13
Pts: Chusonjakku Shiratani 32; Rebs: Chusonjakku Shiratani 9 Asts: Fumiya Nakamura 7		Pts: You-Cheng Jhou 23; Rebs: Yu-Hsuan Jen 7 Asts: You-Cheng Jhou 5

Fukuoka Daiichi High School
Referees: Bohui Kim, Ho Ming Chan, Yimiao Sun

7 June
10:00

Boxscore (Archived)

Chinese Taipei	109–97	Hong Kong
Scoring by quarter: 45–31, 26–14, 17–26, 21–26
Pts: Yu-Sheng Xing 24; Rebs: Two Players 9 (Shao-En Huang, Yu-Sheng Xing); Asts: You-Cheng Jhou 12		Pts: Ka Lok Mat 25; Rebs: Two players 10 (Yuxuan Xiao, Ka Lok Mat); Asts: Cheuk Him Tsang 7

Fukuoka Daiichi High School
Referees: Yimiao Sun, YUSUKE Ichikawa, Haruga Iwai

7 June
14:00

Boxscore (Archived)

China	56–63	Japan
Scoring by quarter: 11–12, 16–18, 18–18, 11–15
Pts: Yizhaojie Zhang 11; Rebs: Junxian Li 10; Asts: Yuxiu Chen 5		Pts: Alex (Hiro) Mcmillian 22; Rebs: Alex (Hiro) Mcmillian 8 Asts: Keiji Koshi 3

Fukuoka Daiichi High School
Referees: Ho Ming Chan, Tzung-Ting Tsai, Bohui Kim

== Final standings ==
Rank	Team	Record
1	China	3–1
2	South Korea	3–1
3	Japan	3–1
4	Chinese Taipei	1–3
5	Hong Kong	0–4

Standings (Archived)
