= 2016 FIBA Oceania Under-18 Championship =

Tournament details
- Host country: Fiji
- City: Suva
- Dates: 5–10 December 2016
- Teams: 7 (from 1 confederation)
- Venue: 1 (in 1 host city)

Final positions
- Champions: New Zealand (1st title)
- Runners-up: Australia
- Third place: Guam

Tournament statistics
- MVP: (New Zealand) Quinn Clinton

Official website
- 2016 FIBA Oceania U-18 Championship

The 2016 FIBA Oceania Under-18 Championship was the sixth edition of the FIBA Oceania Under-18 Championship. This was also the FIBA Oceania's qualifying tournament for the 2017 FIBA Under-19 Basketball World Cup. The tournament was held in Suva, Fiji, from 5 to 10 December 2016. New Zealand beat Australia in the final, 57–51, to win the country's first gold in this event.

== Participating teams ==
- Fiji (Hosts)
- Australia
- Guam
- New Caledonia
- New Zealand
- Samoa
- Tahiti

== Venue ==
- Vodafone Arena, Suva

== Preliminary round ==
All times given are local time (UTC+13)

=== Group A ===
Pos	Team	Pld	W	L	PF	PA	PD	Pts	Qualification
1	Australia	3	3	0	297	86	+211	6	Semifinals
2	Guam	3	2	1	196	225	−29	5	Semifinals
3	Fiji (H)	3	1	2	147	198	−51	4	5th–7th place classification
4	Tahiti	3	0	3	120	251	−131	3	5th–7th place classification

Source: FIBA
(H) Hosts

5 December
12:50

Boxscore

Australia	95–14	Tahiti
Scoring by quarter: 32–2, 19–2, 26–2, 18–8
Pts: Glover 14; Rebs: Rigoni 11; Asts: Kenyon, White 3		Pts: Manate 7 Rebs: Rezzouq, Tanepau 4 Asts: Voirin 3

Vodafone Arena, Suva

5 December
20:10

Boxscore

Fiji	51–64	Guam
Scoring by quarter: 16–19, 6–21, 13–11, 16–13
Pts: Lal 16; Rebs: Wainidroa 15; Asts: Lal 3		Pts: Min 16; Rebs: Temerowski 9 Asts: Min 3

Vodafone Arena, Suva

6 December
16:00

Boxscore

Tahiti	49–65	Fiji
Scoring by quarter: 13–16, 10–23, 12–17, 14–9
Pts: Manate 15; Rebs: Perez 10; Asts: five players 1		Pts: Lal 21; Rebs: Koroi 8 Asts: Lutuciri 3

Vodafone Arena, Suva

6 December
18:00

Boxscore

Guam	41–117	Australia
Scoring by quarter: 14–26, 3–21, 13–35, 11–35
Pts: Gaitan 11; Rebs: Hsieh 3 Asts: Sotelo 4		Pts: Rigoni 16; Rebs: Rigoni 13; Asts: Zunic 7

Vodafone Arena, Suva

7 December
18:00

Boxscore

Guam	91–57	Tahiti
Scoring by quarter: 24–15, 28–14, 16–16, 23–12
Pts: Min 18; Rebs: Temerowski 10; Asts: Sotelo 4		Pts: Wong 11; Rebs: Manate 10; Asts: Manate 3

Vodafone Arena, Suva

7 December
20:00

Boxscore

Fiji	31–85	Australia
Scoring by quarter: 4–20, 11–30, 0–23, 16–12
Pts: Dokonivalu 8 Rebs: Vugona 7 Asts: three players 2		Pts: Rigoni 17; Rebs: Froling, White 10; Asts: Glover 5

Vodafone Arena, Suva

=== Group B ===
Pos	Team	Pld	W	L	PF	PA	PD	Pts	Qualification
1	New Zealand	2	2	0	259	57	+202	4	Semifinals
2	New Caledonia	2	1	1	88	200	−112	3	Semifinals
3	Samoa	2	0	2	98	188	−90	2	5th–7th place classification

Source: FIBA

5 December
18:20

Boxscore

New Caledonia	66–63	Samoa
Scoring by quarter: 18–13, 17–19, 15–21, 16–10
Pts: Laloine 14; Rebs: Dabin 12; Asts: Dabin, Patche 4		Pts: Pauli 18; Rebs: Tautau 14; Asts: Le'Au'Anae 2

Vodafone Arena, Suva

6 December
14:00

Boxscore

Samoa	35–122	New Zealand
Scoring by quarter: 8–35, 9–26, 14–28, 4–33
Pts: Sio 14; Rebs: Sio 6 Asts: Meaalofa 2		Pts: Waardenburg 21; Rebs: T. Cameron, McRae 7 Asts: T. Cameron 4

Vodafone Arena, Suva

7 December
8:00

Boxscore

New Caledonia	22–137	New Zealand
Scoring by quarter: 0–35, 2–32, 10–39, 10–31
Pts: three players 4 Rebs: Dabin 5 Asts: Avenel, Fenuafanote 2		Pts: Waardenburg 29; Rebs: Waardenburg 10; Asts: T. Cameron 7

Vodafone Arena, Suva

== 5th–7th place classification ==
All times given are local time (UTC+13).

5th–7th place semifinal
8 December
Samoa	74
Tahiti	65

Fifth place game
9 December
Fiji	57
Samoa	61

=== 5th–7th place semifinal ===
8 December
15:00

Boxscore

Samoa	74–65	Tahiti
Scoring by quarter: 21–10, 22–23, 18–17, 13–15
Pts: Pauli 24; Rebs: Sio 14; Asts: Meaalofa 4		Pts: Voirin 17; Rebs: Teore 7 Asts: Voirin 3

Vodafone Arena, Suva

=== Fifth place game ===
9 December
10:00

Boxscore

Fiji	57–61	Samoa
Scoring by quarter: 18–9, 13–15, 11–17, 15–20
Pts: Lal 14; Rebs: Wainidroa 9 Asts: Lal 5		Pts: Vaetoe 19; Rebs: Sio 13; Asts: Pauli, Tautau 2

Vodafone Arena, Suva

== Final round ==
All times given are local time (UTC+13).

Semifinals
9 December
Australia	121
New Caledonia	30
9 December
New Zealand	116
Guam	54

Final
10 December
Australia	51
New Zealand	57
Third place game
10 December
New Caledonia	68
Guam	87

=== Semifinals ===
9 December
16:00

Boxscore

Australia	121–30	New Caledonia
Scoring by quarter: 28–3, 31–5, 31–9, 31–13
Pts: White 28; Rebs: Nai 9 Asts: Short 6		Pts: Taieb 6 Rebs: Tessier 5 Asts: Fenuafanote, Taieb 2

Vodafone Arena, Suva

9 December
20:00

Boxscore

New Zealand	116–54	Guam
Scoring by quarter: 31–9, 26–10, 36–21, 23–14
Pts: Waardenburg 21; Rebs: McRae 10; Asts: T. Cameron, Letoa 5		Pts: Min 12; Rebs: Temerowski, Williams 4 Asts: Sotelo 3

Vodafone Arena, Suva

=== Third place game ===
10 December
13:30

Boxscore

New Caledonia	68–87	Guam
Scoring by quarter: 16–27, 13–21, 19–21, 20–18
Pts: Dabin 16; Rebs: Tessier 12; Asts: Dabin 5		Pts: Min 24; Rebs: Temerowski 5 Asts: Sotelo 5

Vodafone Arena, Suva

=== Final ===
10 December
19:00

Boxscore

Australia	51–57	New Zealand
Scoring by quarter: 8–12, 12–15, 17–13, 14–17
Pts: Glover 12; Rebs: Glover 6 Asts: Short 3		Pts: Clinton 14; Rebs: Waardenburg 12; Asts: four players 2

Vodafone Arena, Suva

== Awards ==
2016 FIBA Oceania Under-18
Championship winners

New Zealand
First title

Most Valuable Player of the Grand Final
(New Zealand) Quinn Clinton

All-Tournament Team

- PG – (Guam) Michael Min
- SG – (Australia) Angus Glover
- SF – (New Zealand) Quinn Clinton
- PF – (Australia) Jacob Rigoni
- C – (New Zealand) Sam Waardenburg

== Final standings ==
Qualified for the 2017 FIBA Under-19 Basketball World Cup

Rank	Team	Record
1st place, gold medalist(s)	New Zealand	4–0
2nd place, silver medalist(s)	Australia	4–1
3rd place, bronze medalist(s)	Guam	3–2
4	New Caledonia	1–3
5	Samoa	2–2
6	Fiji	1–3
7	Tahiti	0–4
