= Tahiti men's national under-17 basketball team =

Tahiti
- FIBA zone: FIBA Oceania
- National federation: Fédération Tahitienne de Basketball

U19 World Cup
- Appearances: None

U18 Asia Cup
- Appearances: None

U17/U18 Oceania Cup
- Appearances: 4
- Medals: None

The Tahiti men's national under-17 basketball team is a national basketball team of Tahiti, administered by the Fédération Tahitienne de Basketball. It represents the country in international under-17 men's basketball competitions. The team also participated two times at the former under-18 Oceanian championships.

== FIBA U17 Oceania Cup participations ==
Year	Result
2014	4th
2016	7th
2017	5th
2019	4th

== See also ==
- Tahiti men's national basketball team
- Tahiti women's national under-17 basketball team
