= Cook Islands men's national under-17 basketball team =

Youth national basketball team

Cook Islands
- FIBA zone: FIBA Oceania
- National federation: Cook Islands Basketball Association

U19 World Cup
- Appearances: None

U18 Asia Cup
- Appearances: None

U17 Oceania Cup
- Appearances: 2
- Medals: None

The Cook Islands men's national under-17 basketball team is a national basketball team of Cook Islands, administered by the Cook Islands Basketball Association. It represents the country in international under-17 men's basketball competitions.

The team participated in the FIBA U17 Oceania Cup twice.

== FIBA U17 Oceania Cup participations ==
Year	Result
2019	8th
2025	6th

== See also ==
- Cook Islands men's national basketball team
- Cook Islands women's national basketball team
- Cook Islands women's national under-17 basketball team
