= Jordan men's national under-19 basketball team =

Jordan
- FIBA zone: FIBA Asia
- National federation: Jordan Basketball Federation

U19 World Cup
- Appearances: 2

U18 Asia Cup
- Appearances: 5
- Medals: (bronze) Bronze: 1 (1995)

The Jordan men's national under-18 and under-19 basketball team is a national basketball team of Jordan, administered by the Jordan Basketball Federation. It represents the country in international under-18 and under-19 men's basketball competitions.

== Tournament record ==
=== FIBA Under-19 Basketball World Cup ===
Year	Result
1995	16th
2025	16th

=== FIBA Under-18 Asia Cup ===
Year	Result
1995	3rd place, bronze medalist(s)
1996	9th
2008	10th
2014	10th
2024	4th

== See also ==
- Jordan men's national basketball team
- Jordan men's national under-16 basketball team
- Jordan women's national under-18 basketball team
