= Samoa men's national under-17 and under-18 basketball team =

Youth national basketball team

Samoa
- Joined FIBA: 1982
- FIBA zone: FIBA Oceania
- National federation: Samoa Basketball Association

U19 World Cup
- Appearances: None

U18 Asia Cup
- Appearances: None

U17/U18 Oceania Cup
- Appearances: 6
- Medals: (bronze) Bronze: 3 (2019, 2023, 2025)

The Samoa men's national under-17 and under-18 basketball team is a national basketball team of Samoa, administered by Samoa Basketball Association. It represents the country in international under-17 and under-18 men's basketball competitions.

== U17/U18 Oceania Cup participations ==
| Year | Result |
|---|---|
| 2014 | 6th |
| 2016 | 5th |
| 2017 | 4th |
| 2019 | 3rd place, bronze medalist(s) |
| 2023 | 3rd place, bronze medalist(s) |
| 2025 | 3rd place, bronze medalist(s) |

== See also ==
- Samoa men's national basketball team
- Samoa men's national under-15 basketball team
- Samoa women's national under-15 and under-16 basketball team
