= FIBA Oceania Women's Youth Tournament =

Basketball tournament

- Sport: Basketball
- Founded: 1997
- Folded: 2010
- No. of teams: FIBA Oceania member nations
- Continent: FIBA Oceania (Oceania)
- Last champion: Australia (6th title)
- Most titles: Australia (6 titles)

The FIBA Oceania Women's Youth Tournament was a women's youth basketball tournament that debuted in 1997 and then took place every two years between 1998 and 2010. It featured women's under-20 national teams within the Oceania region.

== Summaries ==
Year	Host	Gold medal game			Bronze medal game		
Year	Host	Gold	Score	Silver	Bronze	Score	Fourth place
1997	Fiji	Fiji	Round-robin	Tahiti	American Samoa	Round-robin	Vanuatu
1998	New Caledonia	New Zealand	89–56	Papua New Guinea	New Caledonia	56–53	Fiji
2000	Vanuatu	Australia	98–38	New Zealand	Fiji	52–47	New Caledonia
2002	Tonga	Australia	76–58	Fiji	Tahiti	58–55	New Zealand
2004	Australia	Australia	71–35	New Zealand	Fiji	111–61	Tahiti
2006	New Zealand	Australia	56–47	New Zealand	New Caledonia	71–56	Fiji
2008	Guam	Australia	108–32	Tahiti	Fiji	75–66	Guam
2010	New Caledonia	Australia	67–61	New Zealand	Fiji	71–51	Tahiti

== Participating nations ==
Nation	1997	1998	2000	2002	2004	2006	2008	2010	Participations
American Samoa	3rd			7th		8th		7th	4
Australia			1st	1st	1st	1st	1st	1st	6
Cook Islands					8th				1
Fiji	1st	4th	3rd	2nd	3rd	4th	3rd	3rd	8
Guam						7th	4th	6th	3
Nauru		6th							1
New Caledonia		3rd	4th	5th	6th	3rd	6th	5th	7
New Zealand		1st	2nd	4th	2nd	2nd		2nd	6
Northern Mariana Islands							7th		1
Palau							8th		1
Papua New Guinea		2nd		8th	5th	5th	5th		5
Solomon Islands					7th				1
Tahiti	2nd			3rd	4th	6th	2nd	4th	6
Tonga				9th					1
Vanuatu	4th	5th	5th	6th				8th	5
