= 2023 FIBA Under-17 Oceania Championship =

International basketball tournament

Tournament details
- Host country: Papua New Guinea
- City: Port Moresby
- Dates: 2–7 October 2023
- Teams: 5 (from 1 confederation)
- Venue: 1 (in 1 host city)

Final positions
- Champions: Australia (8th title)
- Runners-up: New Zealand
- Third place: Samoa

Official website
- www.fiba.basketball

The 2023 FIBA Under-17 Oceania Championship was the ninth edition of the U17/U18 Oceanian basketball championship. The tournament was played in Port Moresby, Papua New Guinea, from 2 to 7 October 2023.

Australia won their third straight U17 title, and eighth championship overall after they defeated New Zealand in the final, 96–49. On the other hand, Samoa notched their second straight podium finish after winning the bronze medal match against Guam, 132–63.

== Participating teams ==
- Australia
- Guam
- New Zealand
- Papua New Guinea
- Samoa

== Group phase ==
In this round, the teams played a round-robin tournament in one group. The top two teams advanced to the final; the next two teams advanced to the third place match.

All times are local (Papua New Guinea Standard Time – UTC+10).

Pos	Team	Pld	W	L	PF	PA	PD	Pts	Qualification
1	Australia	4	4	0	496	197	+299	8	Final
2	New Zealand	4	3	1	419	238	+181	7	Final
3	Samoa	4	2	2	406	387	+19	6	3rd place match
4	Guam	4	1	3	265	508	−243	5	3rd place match
5	Papua New Guinea	4	0	4	230	486	−256	4	

Source: FIBA

2 October 2023
15:45

Boxscore

Guam	24–143	Australia
Scoring by quarter: 6–37, 5–38, 9–32, 4–36

Sir John Guise Indoor Arena, Port Moresby

2 October 2023
18:00

Boxscore

Samoa	126–66	Papua New Guinea
Scoring by quarter: 34–11, 30–19, 35–21, 27–15

Sir John Guise Indoor Arena, Port Moresby

3 October 2023
14:30

Boxscore

Australia	120–63	Samoa
Scoring by quarter: 33–14, 21–21, 35–12, 31–16

Sir John Guise Indoor Arena, Port Moresby

3 October 2023
16:45

Boxscore

Papua New Guinea	32–108	New Zealand
Scoring by quarter: 7–32, 7–26, 10–30, 8–20

Sir John Guise Indoor Arena, Port Moresby

4 October 2023
12:15

Boxscore

Samoa	134–99	Guam
Scoring by quarter: 31–20, 46–33, 38–20, 19–26

Sir John Guise Indoor Arena, Port Moresby

4 October 2023
19:00

Boxscore

New Zealand	72–84	Australia
Scoring by quarter: 16–18, 21–18, 23–27, 12–21

Sir John Guise Indoor Arena, Port Moresby

5 October 2023
14:30

Boxscore

Samoa	83–102	New Zealand
Scoring by quarter: 12–25, 20–17, 24–31, 27–29

Sir John Guise Indoor Arena, Port Moresby

5 October 2023
19:00

Boxscore

Guam	103–94	Papua New Guinea
Scoring by quarter: 33–25, 21–11, 22–32, 27–26

Sir John Guise Indoor Arena, Port Moresby

6 October 2023
13:30

Boxscore

New Zealand	137–39	Guam
Scoring by quarter: 33–5, 32–10, 31–11, 41–13

Sir John Guise Indoor Arena, Port Moresby

6 October 2023
15:45

Boxscore

Papua New Guinea	38–149	Australia
Scoring by quarter: 11–36, 9–39, 8–41, 10–33

Sir John Guise Indoor Arena, Port Moresby

== Playoffs ==
=== 3rd place match ===
7 October 2023
12:15

Boxscore

Samoa	132–63	Guam
Scoring by quarter: 27–14, 37–15, 36–15, 32–19

Sir John Guise Indoor Arena, Port Moresby

=== Final ===
7 October 2023
16:45

Boxscore

Australia	96–49	New Zealand
Scoring by quarter: 30–18, 27–8, 22–12, 17–11

Sir John Guise Indoor Arena, Port Moresby

== Final standings ==
Rank	Team
1st place, gold medalist(s)	Australia
2nd place, silver medalist(s)	New Zealand
3rd place, bronze medalist(s)	Samoa
4	Guam
5	Papua New Guinea

Qualified for the 2024 FIBA U18 Asia Cup
