= Tuvalu women's national basketball team =

Tuvalu
- FIBA ranking: NR (8 August 2025)
- FIBA zone: FIBA Oceania
- National federation: Tuvalu Basketball Association

World Cup
- Appearances: None
- Medals: None

FIBA Oceania Championship
- Appearances: None
- Medals: None

Oceania Basketball Tournament
- Appearances: 1
- Medals: None

The Tuvalu women's national basketball team is the women's team that represents Tuvalu in international basketball and is a member of FIBA Oceania. The national team is currently inactive in international competitive basketball, last participating at the 2001 Oceania Basketball Tournament in Fiji. Nauru initially planned to send a squad for the 2005 South Pacific Mini Games but withdrew due to undisclosed reasons.
