= 2024 FIBA U18 Asia Cup =

27th FIBA Under-18 Asian Basketball Championship

Tournament details
- Host country: Jordan
- City: Amman
- Dates: 2−9 September
- Teams: 16 (from 2 confederations)
- Venue: 2 (in 2 host cities)

Final positions
- Champions: Australia (2nd title)
- Runners-up: New Zealand
- Third place: China

Tournament statistics
- MVP: (Australia) Emmet Adair
- Top scorer: (Qatar) Ndao (22.8)
- Top rebounds: (Qatar) Ndao (11.5)
- Top assists: (New Zealand) Isaac (5.7)
- PPG (Team): Australia (93.8)
- RPG (Team): Australia (61.2)
- APG (Team): South Korea (23.8)

Official website
- www.fiba.basketball

The 2024 FIBA U18 Asia Cup was an international under-18 men's basketball tournament that was held in Amman, Jordan, from 2 to 9 September 2024. It was the 27th edition of the biennial FIBA Under-18 Asia Cup, previously known as the FIBA U18 Asian Championship. The tournament also served as a qualification for the 2025 FIBA Under-19 Basketball World Cup in Switzerland, where the top four teams qualified.

Australia defeated New Zealand in the final, 96–33, to annex their second championship overall.

== Venues ==
Amman	Jordan
Prince Hamza Sports Hall	2024 FIBA U18 Asia Cup (Jordan)
As-Salt	2024 FIBA U18 Asia Cup (Jordan)
Arena Complex	2024 FIBA U18 Asia Cup (Jordan)

== Qualification ==
=== Allocation of berths and auto qualifiers ===
According to FIBA Asia rules, the number of participating teams in the FIBA U18 Asian Championship was set at 16. The hosts and the defending champions qualified automatically. The host does not take its subzone's berth and the defending champions do. All FIBA Asia subzones got two berths each, except for the Central and South Asian subzones, which got one berth each. FIBA Oceania got two berths. The last three berths were allocated to Asian subzones based on their teams' results in the 2022 FIBA U18 Asian Championship.

Allocation of berths
Subzone	Default berths	Additional berth as host	Additional berths as top 3 Asian teams from last championship	Total
Central Asia	1	0	0	1
East Asia	2	0	3	5 (Note: Unlike the host, the defending champion does not provide an additional berth. For example, the defending champion is from East Asia and is auto-qualified. Only 4 berths (5 subtracted by 1) are provided to the other countries from East Asia, not 5.)
Gulf	2	0	0	2
South Asia	1	0	0	1
Southeast Asia	2	0	0	2
West Asia	2	1	0	3
FIBA Oceania	2	0	—N/a	2
Total	12	1	3	16

Automatic qualifiers
Subzone	Host	Defending champion
Central Asia	0	0
East Asia	0	1
Gulf	0	0
South Asia	0	0
Southeast Asia	0	0
West Asia	1	0
FIBA Oceania	0	0
Total	1	1

=== Qualified teams ===
Means of qualification	Date	Venue	Berths	Qualifiers
Host nation	5 March 2024	(Lebanon) Bourj Hammoud	1	Jordan
2024 U18 CABA Qualifier	10–12 July 2024	(Kyrgyzstan) Bishkek	1	Kazakhstan
2022 FIBA U18 Asian Championship winners	21−28 August 2022	(Iran) Tehran	5	South Korea
EABA entrants	N/A	N/A	5	Japan; China; Chinese Taipei; Mongolia
2024 U18 GBA Qualifier	29 July – 2 August 2024	Kuwait	2	Qatar; Kuwait
2024 U18 SABA Qualifier	10–13 July 2024	(Sri Lanka) Colombo	1	India
2024 U18 SEABA Qualifier	19–24 July 2024	(Malaysia) Kuala Lumpur	2	Philippines; Indonesia
2024 U18 WABA Qualifier	11–15 July 2024	(Iraq) Baghdad	2	Lebanon; Iran
2023 FIBA Under-17 Oceania Championship	2–7 October 2023	(Papua New Guinea) Port Moresby	2	Australia; New Zealand
Total			16	

== Preliminary round ==
All times are local (UTC+3:00). The groups were determined after the qualifiers.

=== Group A ===
Pos	Team	Pld	W	L	PF	PA	PD	Pts	Qualification
1	Australia	3	3	0	284	126	+158	6	Quarterfinals
2	Lebanon	3	2	1	209	198	+11	5	Playoffs
3	Chinese Taipei	3	1	2	215	256	−41	4	Playoffs
4	Mongolia	3	0	3	123	251	−128	3	

Source: FIBA
Rules for classification: 1) Points; 2) Head-to-head results; 3) Points difference; 4) Points scored.

2 September
11:30

Boxscore

Australia	93–32	Mongolia
Scoring by quarter: 24–10, 22–8, 25–6, 22–8
Pts: Withbourn 15; Rebs: Withbourn 10; Asts: Honeyman 5		Pts: Ganzorig 11; Rebs: Ganzorig 5 Asts: four players 1

Arena Complex, As-Salt
Referees: Anan Daraghma (PLE), Vladislav Yaroshenko (KAZ), Rendra Lesmana (INA)

2 September
14:00

Boxscore

Chinese Taipei	75–97	Lebanon
Scoring by quarter: 17–32, 25–24, 16–17, 17–24
Pts: Liu 15; Rebs: Chang C.H. 8 Asts: Chuang C.L. 8		Pts: Zamatta 22; Rebs: Oueidat 12; Asts: Oueidat 9

Arena Complex, As-Salt
Referees: Ryan Jones (NZL), Kohei Takano (JPN), Ahmad Suleiman Alyousef (JOR)

3 September
11:30

Boxscore

Lebanon	46–78	Australia
Scoring by quarter: 13–19, 10–18, 10–19, 13–22
Pts: Zamatta 13; Rebs: Oueidat 7 Asts: Naba 5		Pts: Furphy 28; Rebs: Whitbourn 13; Asts: Honeyman 5

Arena Complex, As-Salt
Referees: Sun Jian (CHN), Ahmad Suleiman Alyousef (JOR), Vladislav Yaroshenko (KAZ)

3 September
14:00

Boxscore

Mongolia	46–92	Chinese Taipei
Scoring by quarter: 6–22, 13–13, 13–32, 14–25
Pts: Gantulga, Enkhbat 10; Rebs: Sainbileg 10; Asts: Enkhbayar 3		Pts: Jones 20; Rebs: Shen 6 Asts: four players 4

Arena Complex, As-Salt
Referees: Mohammad Taha (JOR), Elie Rahji (SYR), Aaron Rey Cañete (PHI)

4 September
11:30

Boxscore

Australia	113–48	Chinese Taipei
Scoring by quarter: 30–12, 27–12, 32–8, 24–16
Pts: Honeyman 17; Rebs: Malual 9 Asts: Daniels 7		Pts: Fu, Liu 8 Rebs: Shen 6 Asts: Shen 3

Arena Complex, As-Salt
Referees: Bandar Jassim Al Suwaidi (QAT), Elie Rahji (SYR), Abdullah Alhejaili (KSA)

4 September
14:00

Boxscore

Lebanon	66–45	Mongolia
Scoring by quarter: 26–8, 20–9, 7–14, 13–14
Pts: Choueiri 11; Rebs: Choueiri 10; Asts: Oueidat 4		Pts: Gantulga 15; Rebs: Ganzorig 13; Asts: Enkhbat 5

Arena Complex, As-Salt
Referees: Mohammed Ismail Altarawneh (JOR), Rendra Lesmana (INA), Aaron Rey Cañete (PHI)

=== Group B ===
Pos	Team	Pld	W	L	PF	PA	PD	Pts	Qualification
1	South Korea	3	3	0	288	143	+145	6	Quarterfinals
2	Iran	3	2	1	220	189	+31	5	Playoffs
3	India	3	1	2	162	240	−78	4	Playoffs
4	Kuwait	3	0	3	140	238	−98	3	

Source: FIBA
Rules for classification: 1) Points; 2) Head-to-head results; 3) Points difference; 4) Points scored.

2 September
16:30

Boxscore

Iran	90–53	Kuwait
Scoring by quarter: 20–9, 24–5, 22–20, 24–19
Pts: Keramati, Taheri 13; Rebs: Heydari 7 Asts: Mohammadi 9		Pts: Alsaied 17; Rebs: Mohammad 7 Asts: Asadallah 2

Prince Hamza Sports Hall, Amman
Referees: Safwan Saiefou (SYR), Sun Yimiao (CHN), Mohammad Taha (JOR)

2 September
19:30

Boxscore

South Korea	119–47	India
Scoring by quarter: 31–17, 28–16, 25–9, 35–12
Pts: Kim J.H. 17; Rebs: Kim J.H. 11; Asts: Son 6		Pts: Lavish 10; Rebs: Ranot 7 Asts: Sharma 3

Prince Hamza Sports Hall, Amman
Referees: Sun Jian (CHN), Mohammed Ismail Altarawneh (JOR), Bandar Jassim Al Suwaidi (QAT)

3 September
16:30

Boxscore

India	53–70	Iran
Scoring by quarter: 16–22, 13–15, 15–17, 9–16
Pts: Ishan 14; Rebs: Ishan 9 Asts: Dhanasekar 7		Pts: Heydari 18; Rebs: Heydari 10; Asts: Mohammadi 6

Prince Hamza Sports Hall, Amman
Referees: Ryan Jones (NZL), Issam Al Siyabi (OMA), Kohei Takano (JPN)

3 September
19:30

Boxscore

Kuwait	36–86	South Korea
Scoring by quarter: 12–20, 9–26, 11–25, 4–15
Pts: Alsaied 15; Rebs: Alsaied 7 Asts: Alsaied 3		Pts: Jang 22; Rebs: Jang 9 Asts: Lee B.Y. 6

Prince Hamza Sports Hall, Amman
Referees: Mohammed Ismail Altarawneh (JOR), Safwan Saiefou (SYR), Rendra Lesmana (INA)

4 September
16:30

Boxscore

Iran	60–83	South Korea
Scoring by quarter: 16–15, 15–21, 12–23, 17–24
Pts: Keramati 25; Rebs: Taheri, Farah 5 Asts: Keramati, Heydari 3		Pts: Lee J.W. 21; Rebs: Son 5 Asts: Yang 4

Prince Hamza Sports Hall, Amman
Referees: Mohammad Taha (JOR), Ryan Jones (NZL), Ahmad Suleiman Alyousef (JOR)

4 September
19:30

Boxscore

India	62–51	Kuwait
Scoring by quarter: 14–17, 16–15, 22–7, 10–12
Pts: Sharma 12; Rebs: Ishan 15; Asts: Singh 4		Pts: Alsaied 16; Rebs: Mohammad 12; Asts: Alsaied 5

Prince Hamza Sports Hall, Amman
Referees: Sun Jian (CHN), Kohei Takano (JPN), Sun Yimiao (CHN)

=== Group C ===
Pos	Team	Pld	W	L	PF	PA	PD	Pts	Qualification
1	China	3	3	0	253	159	+94	6	Quarterfinals
2	Japan	3	2	1	223	158	+65	5	Playoffs
3	Qatar	3	1	2	169	236	−67	4	Playoffs
4	Kazakhstan	3	0	3	149	241	−92	3	

Source: FIBA
Rules for classification: 1) Points; 2) Head-to-head results; 3) Points difference; 4) Points scored.

2 September
11:30

Boxscore

China	86–50	Kazakhstan
Scoring by quarter: 36–12, 17–15, 16–20, 17–3
Pts: Zhang B.Y. 22; Rebs: Zhang H.F. 8 Asts: Duan R.Q. 7		Pts: Omarov 10; Rebs: three players 7 Asts: Serimbet 6

Prince Hamza Sports Hall, Amman
Referees: Jack Taylor (AUS), Abdullah Alhejaili (KSA), Keyvan Mahmoodi (IRI)

2 September
14:30

Boxscore

Japan	73–55	Qatar
Scoring by quarter: 15–14, 15–15, 27–10, 16–16
Pts: Watanabe 19; Rebs: Watanabe 14; Asts: Segawa 8		Pts: Mousa 28; Rebs: Ndao 9 Asts: Abuissa 5

Prince Hamza Sports Hall, Amman
Referees: Rabah Noujaim (LBN), Rakesh Ramalingaiah (IND), Elie Rahji (SYR)

3 September
11:30

Boxscore

Qatar	43–99	China
Scoring by quarter: 15–28, 10–22, 8–23, 10–26
Pts: Ndao 15; Rebs: Ndao, Amah 8 Asts: Elgohary 4		Pts: Huan S.F., Liu L. 13; Rebs: Huan S.N. 10; Asts: He 8

Prince Hamza Sports Hall, Amman
Referees: Taha Al-Hashedi (YEM), Sergio Kassab (LBN), An Young Sun (KOR)

3 September
14:30

Boxscore

Kazakhstan	35–84	Japan
Scoring by quarter: 6–25, 13–22, 7–25, 9–12
Pts: Pestov, Baktygali 5 Rebs: Omarov 9 Asts: Medovskoy 4		Pts: Benedict 13; Rebs: three players 5 Asts: Segawa 7

Prince Hamza Sports Hall, Amman
Referees: Khaled Alshammari (KUW), Jack Taylor (AUS), Keyvan Mahmoodi (IRI)

4 September
11:30

Boxscore

China	68–66	Japan
Scoring by quarter: 13–18, 18–20, 17–17, 20–11
Pts: Zhang B.Y. 22; Rebs: Wang H.Z., Yang Y. 4 Asts: Yang Y. 3		Pts: Segawa 23; Rebs: Naito 8 Asts: Watanabe, Segawa 5

Prince Hamza Sports Hall, Amman
Referees: Rabah Noujaim (LBN), Jack Taylor (AUS), Sergio Kassab (LBN)

4 September
14:30

Boxscore

Qatar	71–64	Kazakhstan
Scoring by quarter: 19–12, 13–13, 12–25, 27–14
Pts: Ndao 35; Rebs: Ndao 13; Asts: Ndao 17		Pts: Baktygali 13; Rebs: Omarov 12; Asts: Baktygali 9

Prince Hamza Sports Hall, Amman
Referees: Taha Al-Hashedi (YEM), Khaled Alshammari (KUW), Anan Daraghma (PLE)

=== Group D ===
Pos	Team	Pld	W	L	PF	PA	PD	Pts	Qualification
1	New Zealand	3	3	0	235	163	+72	6	Quarterfinals
2	Jordan (H)	3	2	1	206	186	+20	5	Playoffs
3	Philippines	3	1	2	189	185	+4	4	Playoffs
4	Indonesia	3	0	3	150	246	−96	3	

Source: FIBA
Rules for classification: 1) Points; 2) Head-to-head results; 3) Points difference; 4) Points scored.
(H) Hosts

2 September
16:30

Boxscore

Philippines	75–48	Indonesia
Scoring by quarter: 15–14, 23–2, 25–13, 12–19
Pts: Cabonilas 19; Rebs: Cabonilas 8 Asts: Esperanza 7		Pts: Hady 12; Rebs: Hady 9 Asts: Alex 5

Arena Complex, As-Salt
Referees: Aryan Jamshidi (IRI), Sergio Kassab (LBN), Lin Yuan Dian (TPE)

2 September
19:30

Boxscore

New Zealand	71–62	Jordan
Scoring by quarter: 15–13, 19–12, 11–22, 26–15
Pts: Isaac 23; Rebs: Hopoi 13; Asts: Isaac 7		Pts: Saleh 17; Rebs: Saleh 14; Asts: Kilani 5

Arena Complex, As-Salt
Referees: Taha Al-Hashedi (YEM), Issam Al-Siyabi (OMA), An Young-sun (KOR)

3 September
16:30

Boxscore

Indonesia	43–89	New Zealand
Scoring by quarter: 6–22, 14–19, 11–25, 12–23
Pts: Prayoga Putra 10; Rebs: Prayoga Putra 5 Asts: Hady 3		Pts: Isaac 16; Rebs: Hopoi 8 Asts: Isaac 6

Arena Complex, As-Salt
Referees: Rakesh Ramalingaiah (IND), Abdullah Alhejaili (KSA), Ganbayar Gantumur (MGL)

3 September
19:30

Boxscore

Jordan	62–56	Philippines
Scoring by quarter: 17–13, 19–21, 9–6, 17–16
Pts: Saleh 14; Rebs: Saleh 15; Asts: Kilani 7		Pts: Esperanza 14; Rebs: Burgos 8 Asts: Esperanza 6

Arena Complex, As-Salt
Referees: Rabah Noujaim (LBN), Aryan Jamshidi (IRI), Anan Daraghma (PLE)

4 September
16:30

Boxscore

Philippines	58–75	New Zealand
Scoring by quarter: 16–24, 10–19, 17–15, 15–17
Pts: Medina 30; Rebs: Manding 7 Asts: four players 2		Pts: Hopoi 23; Rebs: Hopoi 16; Asts: Isaac 6

Arena Complex, As-Salt
Referees: Issam Al Siyabi (OMA), Aryan Jamshidi (IRI), An Young Sun (KOR)

4 September
19:30

Boxscore

Jordan	82–59	Indonesia
Scoring by quarter: 11–24, 21–10, 29–15, 21–10
Pts: Saleh 15; Rebs: Saleh 10; Asts: Kilani 9		Pts: Alex 19; Rebs: Hady 11; Asts: Alex 4

Arena Complex, As-Salt
Referees: Safwan Saiefou (SYR), Rakesh Ramalingaiah (IND), Lin Yuan Dian (TPE)

== Brackets ==
=== Main bracket ===
Playoffs
6 September
Japan	85
Philippines	61
6 September
Jordan (OT)	91
Qatar	85
6 September
Lebanon	62
India	64
6 September
Iran	86
Chinese Taipei	73

Quarterfinals
7 September
Australia	89
Japan	41
7 September
South Korea	69
Jordan	73
7 September
China	89
India	43
7 September
New Zealand	87
Iran	61

Semifinals
8 September
Australia	94
Jordan	42
8 September
China	71
New Zealand	86

Final
9 September
Australia	96
New Zealand	33
Third place game
9 September
Jordan	63
China	84

=== 5th place bracket ===
5th–8th place semifinals
8 September
Japan	70
South Korea	74
8 September
India	59
Iran	73

Fifth place game
9 September
South Korea	66
Iran	57
Seventh place game
9 September
Japan	100
India	50

== Final round ==
=== Playoffs ===
6 September
11:30

Boxscore

Lebanon	62–64	India
Scoring by quarter: 16–16, 13–19, 11–18, 22–11
Pts: three players 11; Rebs: Sleiman 10; Asts: Oueidat 5		Pts: Ankush 14; Rebs: Ishan 12; Asts: Lavish 6

Prince Hamza Sports Hall, Amman
Referees: Mohammad Taha (JOR), Kohei Takano (JPN), Ahmad Suleiman Alyousef (JOR)

6 September
14:00

Boxscore

Iran	86–73	Chinese Taipei
Scoring by quarter: 19–22, 15–9, 33–12, 19–30
Pts: Heydari 20; Rebs: Taheri 15; Asts: Keramati, Heydari 6		Pts: Liu 23; Rebs: Chuang 5 Asts: Chuang 7

Prince Hamza Sports Hall, Amman
Referees: Issam Al Siyabi (OMA), Jack Taylor (AUS), Abdullah Alhejaili (KSA)

6 September
16:30

Boxscore

Japan	85–61	Philippines
Scoring by quarter: 23–19, 17–12, 24–19, 21–11
Pts: Watanabe 15; Rebs: Watanabe, Naito 6 Asts: Sugeno 5		Pts: Esperanza 16; Rebs: Burgos 10; Asts: Esperanza 6

Prince Hamza Sports Hall, Amman
Referees: Sun Jian (CHN), Aryan Jamshidi (IRI), Elie Rahji (SYR)

6 September
19:30

Boxscore

Jordan	91–85 (OT)	Qatar
Scoring by quarter: 14–22, 25–15, 26–13, 14–29, Overtime: 12–6
Pts: Saleh 35; Rebs: Alshami 15; Asts: Kilani 9		Pts: Mousa 29; Rebs: Ndao 12; Asts: Ndao 4

Prince Hamza Sports Hall, Amman
Referees: Rabah Noujaim (LBN), Ryan Jones (NZL), Sergio Kassab (LBN)

=== Quarterfinals ===
7 September
11:30

Boxscore

China	89–43	India
Scoring by quarter: 28–7, 17–12, 27–8, 17–16
Pts: Liu 15; Rebs: Liu 8 Asts: Yang 5		Pts: Sandhu 13; Rebs: Ishan 8 Asts: Ranot 2

Prince Hamza Sports Hall, Amman
Referees: Issam Al Siyabi (OMA), Jack Taylor (AUS), Rendra Lesmana (INA)

7 September
14:00

Boxscore

New Zealand	87–61	Iran
Scoring by quarter: 17–15, 24–13, 24–13, 22–20
Pts: Issac 24; Rebs: Treacher 6 Asts: Issac 7		Pts: Taheri 19; Rebs: Taheri 9 Asts: Heydari 4

Prince Hamza Sports Hall, Amman
Referees: Mohammad Taha (JOR), Taha Al-Hashedi (YEM), Sergio Kassab (LBN)

7 September
16:30

Boxscore

Australia	89–41	Japan
Scoring by quarter: 22–5, 21–10, 21–14, 25–12
Pts: Adair 23; Rebs: Whitbourn 13; Asts: Brogan, Honeyman 4		Pts: Fukasawa, Watanabe 8 Rebs: Fukasawa, Watanabe 4 Asts: Sugeno 3

Prince Hamza Sports Hall, Amman
Referees: Rabah Noujaim (LBN), Sun Jian (CHN), Abdullah Alhejaili (KSA)

7 September
19:30

Boxscore

South Korea	69–73	Jordan
Scoring by quarter: 17–26, 19–17, 16–15, 17–15
Pts: Gu 17; Rebs: Wi, Yang 6 Asts: Son 7		Pts: Salman 21; Rebs: Alshami 12; Asts: Hijazi 6

Prince Hamza Sports Hall, Amman
Referees: Ryan Jones (NZL), Aryan Jamshidi (IRI), Rakesh Ramalingaiah (IND)

=== 5th–8th place semifinals ===
8 September
11:30

Boxscore

India	59–73	Iran
Scoring by quarter: 21–20, 11–18, 16–19, 11–16
Pts: Dhanasekar 18; Rebs: Ishan 8 Asts: Singh 3		Pts: Edalatfar 17; Rebs: Mansouri 7 Asts: Heydari 6

Prince Hamza Sports Hall, Amman
Referees: Khaled Alshammari (KUW), Vladislav Yaroshenko (KAZ), An Young Sun (KOR)

8 September
14:00

Boxscore

Japan	70–74	South Korea
Scoring by quarter: 15–17, 13–26, 20–8, 22–23
Pts: Segawa 24; Rebs: Watanabe 11; Asts: Segawa 6		Pts: Edi 17; Rebs: Edi 7 Asts: Yang, Kim K.H. 4

Prince Hamza Sports Hall, Amman
Referees: Keyvan Mahmoodi (IRI), Sun Yimiao (CHN), Ganbayar Gantumur (MGL)

=== Semifinals ===
8 September
16:30

Boxscore

China	71–86	New Zealand
Scoring by quarter: 20–18, 17–24, 18–21, 16–23
Pts: Duan, Zhang B.Y. 15; Rebs: Wang H.Z. 9 Asts: Yang 8		Pts: Hopoi 24; Rebs: Isaac 13; Asts: Isaac 5

Prince Hamza Sports Hall, Amman
Referees: Issam Al-Siyabi (OMA), Rakesh Ramalingaiah (IND), Anan Daraghma (PLE)

8 September
19:30

Boxscore

Australia	94–42	Jordan
Scoring by quarter: 32–16, 25–10, 12–11, 25–5
Pts: Fennell 24; Rebs: Adair, Whitbourn 14; Asts: Brogan 10		Pts: Saleh 14; Rebs: Alshami 6 Asts: Shaaban 3

Prince Hamza Sports Hall, Amman
Referees: Taha Al-Hashedi (YEM), Aryan Jamshidi (IRI), Bandar Jassim Al Suwaidi (QAT)

=== Seventh place game ===
9 September
11:30

Boxscore

Japan	100–50	India
Scoring by quarter: 26–10, 17–12, 34–15, 23–13
Pts: Segawa 21; Rebs: Segawa, Shiratani 7 Asts: Segawa 7		Pts: Dhanasekar 15; Rebs: Ishan 6 Asts: three players 2

Prince Hamza Sports Hall, Amman
Referees: Khaled Alshammari (KUW), Safwan Saiefou (SYR), Lin Yuan Dian (TPE)

=== Fifth place game ===
9 September
14:00

Boxscore

South Korea	66–57	Iran
Scoring by quarter: 16–13, 19–9, 16–11, 16–24
Pts: Gu 20; Rebs: Edi 9 Asts: Edi 5		Pts: Heydari 16; Rebs: Heydari 7 Asts: three players 4

Prince Hamza Sports Hall, Amman
Referees: Ahmad Suleiman Alyousef (JOR), Elie Rahji (SYR), Aaron Rey Cañete (PHI)

=== Third place game ===
9 September
16:30

Boxscore

Jordan	63–84	China
Scoring by quarter: 17–27, 19–19, 22–18, 5–20
Pts: Saleh 13; Rebs: Saleh 13; Asts: Kilani 5		Pts: Chen, Zhang 22; Rebs: Wang 7 Asts: Duan, Yang 5

Prince Hamza Sports Hall, Amman
Referees: Issam Al Siyabi (OMA), Jack Taylor (AUS), Taha Al-Hashedi (YEM)

=== Final ===
9 September
19:30

Boxscore

Australia	96–33	New Zealand
Scoring by quarter: 24–8, 28–8, 33–5, 11–12
Pts: Furphy 21; Rebs: Malual, Whitbourn 11; Asts: Furphy 4		Pts: Hopoi 9 Rebs: Hopoi 7 Asts: Issac 3

Prince Hamza Sports Hall, Amman
Referees: Rabah Noujaim (LBN), Mohammad Taha (JOR), Aryan Jamshidi (IRI)

== Final standings ==
Rank	Team	Record
1st place, gold medalist(s)	Australia	6–0
2nd place, silver medalist(s)	New Zealand	5–1
3rd place, bronze medalist(s)	China	5–1
4	Jordan	4–3
5	South Korea	5–1
6	Iran	4–3
7	Japan	4–3
8	India	2–5
9	Lebanon	2–2
10	Philippines	1–3
11	Chinese Taipei	1–3
12	Qatar	1–3
13	Indonesia	0–3
14	Kazakhstan	0–3
15	Kuwait	0–3
16	Mongolia	0–3

Qualified for the 2025 FIBA Under-19 Basketball World Cup

== Awards ==
2024 U18 Asia Cup champions

Australia
Second title

Most Valuable Player
(Australia) Emmet Adair

=== All-Tournament Team ===
- F (China) Zhang Boyuan
- F (Australia) Emmet Adair (MVP)
- F (Jordan) Saif Aldeen Saleh
- G (Australia) Jacob Furphy
- G (New Zealand) Tamatoa Isaac
