= Guam men's national under-17 and under-18 basketball team =

Youth national basketball team

Guam
- Joined FIBA: 1974
- FIBA zone: FIBA Oceania
- National federation: Guam Basketball Confederation

U19 World Cup
- Appearances: None

U18 Asia Cup
- Appearances: None

U17/U18 Oceania Cup
- Appearances: 6
- Medals: (bronze) Bronze: 2 (2016, 2017)

The Guam men's national under-17 and under-18 basketball team is a national basketball team of Guam, administered by the Guam Basketball Confederation. It represents the country in international under-17 and under-18 men's basketball competitions.

== FIBA U17 Oceania Cup participations ==
Year	Result
2014	5th
2016	3rd place, bronze medalist(s)
2017	3rd place, bronze medalist(s)
2019	5th
2023	4th
2025	4th

== See also ==
- Guam men's national basketball team
- Guam men's national under-15 basketball team
- Guam women's national under-18 basketball team
