= Raylee =

Raylee is a given name. Notable people with the name include:

- Raylee (singer), Norwegian singer
- Raylee Johnson (born 1970), American football player

== See also ==
- Rayleen
