= 2019 FIBA Under-17 Oceania Championship =

2nd Oceanian U17 Men's Basketball Championship

Tournament details
- Host country: New Caledonia
- City: Nouméa
- Dates: 18–24 August 2019
- Teams: 8 (from 1 confederation)
- Venues: 2 (in 1 host city)

Final positions
- Champions: Australia (7th title)
- Runners-up: New Zealand
- Third place: Samoa

Tournament statistics
- Top scorer: (French Polynesia) Roopina (16.8)
- Top rebounds: (Samoa) Baea (13.3)
- Top assists: (Australia) Giddey (5.0)
- PPG (Team): Australia (110.8)
- RPG (Team): Papua New Guinea (59.3)
- APG (Team): Australia (19.0)

Official website
- 2019 FIBA U-17 Oceania Championship

The 2019 FIBA Under-17 Oceania Championship was an international under-17 basketball tournament that was held from 18 to 24 August 2019 in Nouméa, New Caledonia. The second U17 tournament held after being rechristened from U18 to U17 Oceania championships, this served as the direct qualifier for the 2020 FIBA U18 Asian Championship where 2 slots were allotted for FIBA Oceania, though the U18 Asian tournament was eventually cancelled due to COVID-19 pandemic.

Australia annexed their second straight U17 title, and seventh championship overall by defeating New Zealand in the Final, 85–56. Meanwhile, Samoa notched their first ever podium finish by winning the Bronze Medal match against Tahiti, 87–59.

== Hosts selection ==
On 23 September 2016, FIBA Oceania announced during their board meeting that Nouméa, New Caledonia will be the host of the 2019 edition of U17 tournament.

== Tournament format ==
The teams have been seeded based on the results of the previous FIBA Oceania Youth competitions. On this rankings, the top four teams were placed in Group A and the next four teams in Group B.

The top two teams in Group A were guaranteed a place in Semifinals, while Group A's third and fourth-placed teams battled the top two teams in Group B in the Quarterfinals which determined the Final Four cast.

== Participating teams ==
On 18 August 2019, the following teams have their rosters confirmed during the technical meeting held in Apia, Samoa:

- Australia
- Cook Islands
- Guam
- New Caledonia
- New Zealand
- Papua New Guinea
- Samoa
- Tahiti

== Group phase ==
All times are in New Caledonia Time Zone (UTC+11:00)

=== Group A ===
Pos	Team	Pld	W	L	PF	PA	PD	Pts	Qualification
1	Australia	3	3	0	347	132	+215	6	Semifinals
2	New Zealand	3	2	1	245	142	+103	5	Semifinals
3	Samoa	3	1	2	154	230	−76	4	Quarterfinals
4	Guam	3	0	3	104	346	−242	3	Quarterfinals

Source: FIBA
Rules for classification: 1) Points; 2) Head-to-head results; 3) Points difference; 4) Points scored.

19 August 2019
15:00

Boxscore

Australia	149–45	Guam

L'Arène du Sud, Païta

19 August 2019
17:00

Boxscore

New Zealand	78–37	Samoa

L'Arène du Sud, Païta

20 August 2019
11:00

Boxscore

Samoa	24–112	Australia

L'Arène du Sud, Païta

20 August 2019
15:00

Boxscore

Guam	19–104	New Zealand

L'Arène du Sud, Païta

21 August 2019
11:00

Boxscore

Australia	86–63	New Zealand

L'Arène du Sud, Païta

21 August 2019
18:00

Boxscore

Guam	40–93	Samoa

Salle Anewy, Nouméa

=== Group B ===
Pos	Team	Pld	W	L	PF	PA	PD	Pts	Qualification
1	Tahiti	3	3	0	219	135	+84	6	Quarterfinals
2	New Caledonia (H)	3	2	1	206	223	−17	5	Quarterfinals
3	Papua New Guinea	3	1	2	214	238	−24	4	Seventh place game
4	Cook Islands	3	0	3	163	206	−43	3	Seventh place game

Source: FIBA
Rules for classification: 1) Points; 2) Head-to-head results; 3) Points difference; 4) Points scored.
(H) Hosts

18 August 2019
19:00

Boxscore

Cook Islands	68–76	New Caledonia

L'Arène du Sud, Païta

19 August 2019
18:00

Boxscore

Tahiti	90–58	Papua New Guinea

Salle Anewy, Nouméa

20 August 2019
18:00

Boxscore

Papua New Guinea	72–61	Cook Islands

Salle Anewy, Nouméa

20 August 2019
19:00

Boxscore

New Caledonia	43–71	Tahiti

L'Arène du Sud, Païta

21 August 2019
15:00

Boxscore

Tahiti	58–34	Cook Islands

L'Arène du Sud, Païta

21 August 2019
19:00

Boxscore

New Caledonia	87–84	Papua New Guinea

L'Arène du Sud, Païta

== Final round ==
=== Bracket ===
Quarterfinals
22 August
Guam	55
Tahiti	71
22 August
Samoa	120
New Caledonia	50

Semifinals
23 August
Australia	122
Tahiti	34
23 August
New Zealand	95
Samoa	37

Final
24 August
Australia	85
New Zealand	56
Third place game
24 August
Tahiti	59
Samoa	87

=== Quarterfinals ===
22 August 2019
15:00

Boxscore

Guam	55–71	Tahiti

L'Arène du Sud, Païta

22 August 2019
19:00

Boxscore

Samoa	120–50	New Caledonia

L'Arène du Sud, Païta

=== Seventh place game ===
22 August 2019
11:00

Boxscore

Papua New Guinea	65–62	Cook Islands

L'Arène du Sud, Païta

=== Fifth place game ===
23 August 2019
11:00

Boxscore

New Caledonia	58–63	Guam

L'Arène du Sud, Païta

=== Semifinals ===
23 August 2019
15:00

Boxscore

Australia	122–34	Tahiti

L'Arène du Sud, Païta

23 August 2019
19:00

Boxscore

New Zealand	95–37	Samoa

L'Arène du Sud, Païta

=== Third place game ===
24 August 2019
15:00

Boxscore

Tahiti	59–87	Samoa

L'Arène du Sud, Païta

=== Final ===
24 August 2019
19:00

Boxscore

Australia	85–56	New Zealand

L'Arène du Sud, Païta

== Final standings ==
Rank	Team	Record
1st place, gold medalist(s)	Australia	5–0
2nd place, silver medalist(s)	New Zealand	3–2
3rd place, bronze medalist(s)	Samoa	3–3
4	Tahiti	4–2
5	Guam	1–4
6	New Caledonia	2–3
7	Papua New Guinea	2–2
8	Cook Islands	0–4

Qualified for the 2020 FIBA U18 Asian Championship

== Awards ==
2019 Under-17 Oceanian champions

Australia
Seventh title

=== All-Tournament Team ===
Here are the 2019 FIBA U17 Oceania All-Star Five for the Men's Division:

- (Australia) Tamuri Wigness
- (Australia) Paul Tsapatolis
- (Australia) Josh Giddey
- (New Zealand) Robbie Coman
- (Samoa) Egon Keil
