= Sean Macdonald =

Australian basketball player (born 2000)

No. 13 – Melbourne United
- Position: Guard
- League: NBL

Personal information
- Born: 21 April 2000 (age 26)
- Listed height: 188 cm (6 ft 2 in)
- Listed weight: 86 kg (190 lb)

Career information
- Playing career: 2018–present

Career history
- 2018–2019: Kilsyth Cobras
- 2021: Dandenong Rangers
- 2021–2026: Tasmania JackJumpers
- 2022: North-West Tasmania Thunder
- 2023–2024: Darwin Salties
- 2025: Canterbury Rams
- 2026–present: Melbourne United

Career highlights
- NBL champion (2024); NZNBL All-Star Five (2025); NBL Most Improved Player (2024)

Sean Matthew Macdonald (born 21 April 2000) is an Australian professional basketball player for Melbourne United of the National Basketball League (NBL). He joined the JackJumpers in 2021 as a development player. In 2024, he won the NBL Most Improved Player Award and helped the JackJumpers win the NBL championship.

== Early life and career ==
Macdonald grew up in Melbourne, Victoria, and played as a junior with the Dandenong Rangers. He helped the Under 18 Victoria Metro state team to the 2017 national title and the Under 20 Victoria state team to the 2018 national title.

In January 2018, Macdonald signed with the Kilsyth Cobras of the South East Australian Basketball League (SEABL). In 14 games during the 2018 SEABL season, he averaged 8.2 points, 1.9 rebounds and 2.1 assists per game.

Macdonald returned to the Cobras in 2019 for the inaugural season of the NBL1. In 17 games, he averaged 10 points, 2.2 rebounds and 3.0 assists in 23.2 minutes per game.

Macdonald was set to join the Dandenong Rangers for the 2020 NBL1 season, but the season was cancelled due to the COVID-19 pandemic. After spending the 2020–21 NBL season training with the South East Melbourne Phoenix, Macdonald re-joined the Rangers in the NBL1 South for the 2021 season.

== Professional career ==
In August 2021, Macdonald signed with the Tasmania JackJumpers as a development player for the team's inaugural season in the NBL in 2021–22. He made eight appearances in his first season and was part of the JackJumpers team that reached the 2022 NBL Grand Final series.

Macdonald joined the North-West Tasmania Thunder for the 2022 NBL1 South season and averaged 17.7 points, 3.5 rebounds, 2.5 assists and 2.0 steals per game.

In June 2022, Macdonald re-signed with the JackJumpers as a development player for the 2022–23 NBL season. He saw increased minutes in the first half of the season while Clint Steindl recovered from injury. He subsequently signed a new two-year contract with the team on 6 January 2023 to remain as a development player in 2023–24 and become a full-time roster player in 2024–25. He went on to cover for the injured Josh Magette later in the season. He finished the season averaging 6.3 points, 2.0 rebounds and 1.5 assists in 21 minutes per game, proving himself a knockdown shooter and playmaker. He was nominated for the Most Improved Player award.

Macdonald joined the Darwin Salties of the NBL1 North for the 2023 season and averaged 14.7 points, 5.0 assists, 4.7 rebounds and 1.8 steals per game.

In the 2023–24 NBL season, Macdonald played in every game for the JackJumpers as a development player. On 1 January 2024, he scored a team-high 23 points and hit seven of nine 3-point attempts in a loss to the New Zealand Breakers. He was nominated for the Best Sixth Man award and was the recipient of the NBL Most Improved Player Award. He helped the JackJumpers reach the 2024 grand final series, where they defeated Melbourne United 3–2 to win the NBL championship. Macdonald started in game five of the series. He appeared in all 37 games and averaged eight points, 2.2 rebounds and 2.4 assists per game.

Macdonald re-joined the Salties for the 2024 NBL1 North season. In 14 games, he averaged 16.29 points, 5.36 rebounds, 6.21 assists and 1.5 steals per game.

After being elevated to a fully rostered player for the 2024–25 NBL season, Macdonald extended his contract with the JackJumpers on 2 May 2024 for an additional year until the end of 2025–26 season. In September 2024, the JackJumpers played in the FIBA Intercontinental Cup. During the tournament, Macdonald sustained an ankle injury and was subsequently ruled out for three months. He made his season debut for the JackJumpers in mid November, with the team sitting on a 4–8 record. He appeared in nine games before a foot injury sustained in round 15 ruled him out for the rest of the regular season.

Macdonald joined the Canterbury Rams of the New Zealand National Basketball League (NZNBL) for the 2025 season. He was named to the NZNBL All-Star Five.

After missing the entire 2025–26 NBL season with an ACL injury, Macdonald re-signed with the JackJumpers to a one-year deal on 31 March 2026. However, during a one on one training session a week later, he twisted his knee and suffered a partial tear in the same ACL. He was subsequently ruled out for the first half of the 2026–27 NBL season, and later released by the JackJumpers in mutually agreement on 30 May 2026.

On 20 July 2026, Macdonald signed a three-year contract with Melbourne United, joining as the team's Nominated Replacement Player (NRP) for the first year of the deal before entering the full roster in the second and third (the third year being a mutual option). On 1 September 2026, he was ruled out for the entire 2026–27 season after it was determined that he required a second ACL reconstruction.

== National team career ==
In 2016, Macdonald was a member of the Australian under 17 national team that finished seventh at the FIBA Under-17 World Championship in Spain. In 2017, he helped the Australian under 17 team win gold at the FIBA Under-17 Oceania Championship. He played for Australia at the 2018 FIBA Under-18 Asian Championship and 2019 FIBA Under-19 Basketball World Cup.

Macdonald made his debut for the Australian Boomers during the 2023 FIBA Basketball World Cup Asian qualifiers.

In July 2025, Macdonald was named in the Boomers squad in the lead up to the 2025 FIBA Asia Cup in Saudi Arabia. He missed the tournament after suffering a ruptured anterior cruciate ligament in a warm up game.
