= Rayleen Lynch =

Australian basketball player

Personal information
- Born: c. 1946 Cairns, Queensland
- Position: Point guard
- Number: 4

Career highlights
- Queensland Basketball Hall of Fame (2016)

Rayleen Lynch (m. Decker) is a retired Australian women's basketball player.

== Biography ==
Lynch was born in Cairns and became a multi-sport prodigy, gaining representative honours in basketball, tennis, softball, and athletics. At the age of 16, she was recruited to play basketball in Brisbane for North-West Districts. In 1963 Lynch first represented Queensland in basketball when she was selected in the team to contest the Australian championship in Perth. She continued to represent Queensland until 1973.

At official FIBA events, Forster played at the 1967 World Championships in Prague, Czechoslovakia. With this selection Lynch became the first Queensland basketballer to represent Australia.

Lynch is considered a pioneer of elite basketball in Queensland and was inducted in the Queensland Basketball Hall of Fame in 2016.

Lynch is the great aunt of fellow basketball player, Kody Stattmann.
