= New Zealand men's national under-19 basketball team =

New Zealand
- Joined FIBA: 1951
- FIBA zone: FIBA Asia
- National federation: Basketball New Zealand
- Coach: Josiah Maama
- Nickname: Junior Tall Blacks

U19 World Cup
- Appearances: 5

U18 Asia Cup
- Appearances: 3
- Medals: Silver: 2 (2018, 2024); Bronze: 1 (2026)

U17/U18 Oceania Cup
- Appearances: 10
- Medals: (gold) Gold: 2 (2016, 2025); (silver) Silver: 8 (2006, 2008, 2010, 2012, 2014, 2017, 2019, 2023)
Home	Away

The New Zealand men's national under-17, under-18 and under-19 basketball team is the men's basketball side that represents New Zealand in international under-17, under-18 and under-19 basketball competitions, including the FIBA Under-19 Basketball World Cup and FIBA Under-18 Asia Cup. Nicknamed the Junior Tall Blacks, the team is governed by Basketball New Zealand. The national open men's team is called the Tall Blacks, which is one of many national team nicknames, similar to that of the All Blacks, and relating to the New Zealand silver tree fern. One of the Junior Tall Blacks' greatest accomplishments has been winning the 2016 FIBA Oceania Under-18 Championship, and therefore qualifying for the 2017 FIBA Under-19 World Championship for the first time in team history. The team did play in a 2009 FIBA Under-19 World Championship as hosts, because New Zealand hosted the event, but the team had not officially qualified for the tournament.

== Tournament record ==
=== U19 World Cup ===
Year	Result
2009	13th
2017	11th
2019	13th
2025	4th
2027	Qualified

=== U18 Asia Cup ===
Year	Result
2018	2nd place, silver medalist(s)
2024	2nd place, silver medalist(s)
2026	3rd place, bronze medalist(s)

=== U17/U18 Oceania Championship ===
Year	Result
2006	2nd place, silver medalist(s)
2008	2nd place, silver medalist(s)
2010	2nd place, silver medalist(s)
2012	2nd place, silver medalist(s)
2014	2nd place, silver medalist(s)
2016	1st place, gold medalist(s)
2017	2nd place, silver medalist(s)
2019	2nd place, silver medalist(s)
2023	2nd place, silver medalist(s)
2025	1st place, gold medalist(s)

== See also ==
- New Zealand men's national basketball team
- New Zealand men's national under-17 basketball team
- New Zealand women's national under-19 basketball team
