= 2025 FIBA U17 Oceania Cup =

International youth basketball tournament

Tournament details
- Host country: Samoa
- City: Apia
- Dates: 8–13 December 2025
- Teams: 6 (from 1 confederation)
- Venue: 1 (in 1 host city)

Final positions
- Champions: New Zealand (1st title)
- Runners-up: Australia
- Third place: Samoa

Tournament statistics
- MVP: (New Zealand) Hoani Ifopo-Togia

Official website
- www.fiba.basketball

The 2025 FIBA U17 Oceania Cup was the 10th edition of the Oceanian basketball championship for under-17 men's national teams. The tournament was played in Apia, Samoa, from 8 to 13 December 2025. New Zealand won their first U17 Oceania Cup title as they defeated Australia in the final, 82–62, with their only other win being the U18 Oceania Cup in 2016.

== Participating teams ==
- Australia
- Cook Islands
- Fiji
- Guam
- New Zealand
- Samoa

== Group phase ==
In this round, the teams were drawn into two groups of three. Both groups were played in a round-robin format. The group winners advanced to the semifinals, but before that, they played a SF-seeding match. The other teams advanced to the quarterfinals.

All times are local (Time in Samoa; UTC+13).

=== Group A ===
Pos	Team	Pld	W	L	PF	PA	PD	Pts	Qualification
1	Australia	2	2	0	222	108	+114	4	SF-seeding match
2	Guam	2	1	1	124	164	−40	3	Quarterfinals
3	Fiji	2	0	2	97	171	−74	2	Quarterfinals

Source: FIBA

8 December 2025
13:30

Boxscore

Australia	113–42	Fiji
Scoring by quarter: 38–6, 23–10, 21–19, 31–7

Tuanaimato Gym 2, Apia

9 December 2025
11:00

Boxscore

Fiji	55–58	Guam
Scoring by quarter: 12–11, 16–15, 18–15, 9–17

Tuanaimato Gym 2, Apia

10 December 2025
13:30

Boxscore

Guam	66–109	Australia
Scoring by quarter: 18–32, 10–19, 20–26, 18–32

Tuanaimato Gym 2, Apia

=== Group B ===
Pos	Team	Pld	W	L	PF	PA	PD	Pts	Qualification
1	New Zealand	2	2	0	271	87	+184	4	SF-seeding match
2	Samoa (H)	2	1	1	151	192	−41	3	Quarterfinals
3	Cook Islands	2	0	2	103	246	−143	2	Quarterfinals

Source: FIBA
(H) Hosts

8 December 2025
11:00

Boxscore

New Zealand	145–37	Cook Islands
Scoring by quarter: 21–8, 41–11, 26–2, 57–16

Tuanaimato Gym 2, Apia

9 December 2025
18:30

Boxscore

Cook Islands	66–101	Samoa
Scoring by quarter: 18–23, 17–25, 16–27, 15–26

Tuanaimato Gym 2, Apia

10 December 2025
16:00

Boxscore

Samoa	50–126	New Zealand
Scoring by quarter: 12–40, 10–31, 21–26, 7–29

Tuanaimato Gym 2, Apia

== Playoffs ==
=== Brackets ===
SF-seeding match
A1	Australia	93
B1	New Zealand	87

Quarterfinals
A2	Guam	102
B3	Cook Islands	69
A3	Fiji	63
B2	Samoa	68

Semifinals
A1	Australia	124
A2	Guam	51
B1	New Zealand	131
B2	Samoa	27

Final
A1	Australia	62
B1	New Zealand	82
3rd place match
A2	Guam	78
B2	Samoa	84

5th place match
B3	Cook Islands	81
A3	Fiji	89

=== SF-seeding match ===
11 December 2025
19:30

Boxscore

Australia	93–87	New Zealand
Scoring by quarter: 17–23, 16–27, 24–17, 36–20

Tuanaimato Gym 2, Apia

=== Quarterfinals ===
11 December 2025
9:00

Boxscore

Guam	102–69	Cook Islands
Scoring by quarter: 21–17, 22–23, 26–14, 33–15

Tuanaimato Gym 2, Apia

11 December 2025
11:00

Boxscore

Fiji	63–68	Samoa
Scoring by quarter: 11–14, 12–20, 23–18, 17–16

Tuanaimato Gym 2, Apia

==== 5th place match ====
12 December 2025
9:00

Boxscore

Cook Islands	81–89	Fiji
Scoring by quarter: 27–25, 10–22, 17–15, 27–27

Tuanaimato Gym 2, Apia

=== Semifinals ===
12 December 2025
17:30

Boxscore

Australia	124–51	Guam
Scoring by quarter: 34–13, 31–14, 31–9, 28–15

Tuanaimato Gym 2, Apia

12 December 2025
19:30

Boxscore

New Zealand	131–27	Samoa
Scoring by quarter: 39–5, 34–7, 29–9, 29–6

Tuanaimato Gym 2, Apia

==== 3rd place match ====
13 December 2025
12:30

Boxscore

Guam	78–84	Samoa
Scoring by quarter: 26–14, 18–24, 16–16, 18–30

Tuanaimato Gym 2, Apia

==== Final ====
13 December 2025
17:30

Boxscore

Australia	62–82	New Zealand
Scoring by quarter: 20–21, 18–18, 16–22, 8–21

Tuanaimato Gym 2, Apia

== Final standings ==
Rank	Team
1st place, gold medalist(s)	New Zealand
2nd place, silver medalist(s)	Australia
3rd place, bronze medalist(s)	Samoa
4	Guam
5	Fiji
6	Cook Islands

Qualified for the 2026 FIBA U18 Asia Cup

== Awards ==
2025 U17 Oceanian champions

New Zealand
First title

=== All-Tournament Team ===
- (Australia) Luke Paul
- (New Zealand) Hoani Ifopo-Togia (MVP)
- (New Zealand) Cole Hopoi
- (Australia) Jai Fa'ale
- (Samoa) Micah Watson
