= FIBA Oceania =

Basketball governing authority in Oceania

- Founded: 1967
- Type: Sports federation
- Headquarters: Suite 1801, Level 8, Tower 1, 56 Scarborough Street, Southport, Gold Coast, Queensland, Australia
- Members: 22 member associations
- Official language: English
- President: (Australia) David Reid
- Website: FIBA Oceania
- Formerly called: Oceania Basketball Confederation

FIBA Oceania is a zone within FIBA (International Basketball Federation). It is one of FIBA's five continental confederations. FIBA Oceania is responsible for the organization and governance of the major international tournaments in Oceania. It has 22 FIBA national federations and is headquartered in Southport, Gold Coast, Queensland, Australia. The current FIBA Oceania President is David Reid from Australia.

Its prime events were the FIBA Oceania Championship for men and the FIBA Oceania Women's Championship. The men's championship, established in 1971, was dominated by Australia. Yet, on some occasions, New Zealand defeated its rival, which was first accomplished in 1978. Australia was even more dominant in the women's tournament, first held in 1974; the Opals won all but one of its editions, with New Zealand winning only the 1993 edition. Both Oceania Championships held their last editions in 2015. Since then, FIBA Oceania and FIBA Asia national teams compete for a single championship for each sex—the men's FIBA Asia Cup and the FIBA Women's Asia Cup.

== History ==
FIBA Oceania was founded by Alistair Ramsay in 1967. Known as the Oceania Basketball Confederation at the time, FIBA Oceania was recognized as a FIBA zone in 1968 during the FIBA Congress in Mexico City.

Although the national basketball federations of Australia and New Zealand remain members of FIBA Oceania, their national teams have competed in FIBA Asia competitions since 2017. This change was part of a restructuring of the international competition system and did not involve the two federations formally joining FIBA Asia.

== Member associations ==
Nation	Association	National teams	FIBA affiliation
American Samoa	American Samoa Basketball Association	Men's; U19; U17; U15; Women's; U19; U17; U15	1976
Australia	Basketball Australia	Men's; U19; U17; U15; Women's; U19; U17; U15	1947
Cook Islands	Cook Islands Basketball Association	Men's; U19; U17; U15; Women's; U19; U17; U15	1985
Fiji	Fiji Amateur Basketball Federation	Men's; U19; U17; U15; Women's; U19; U17; U15	1979
Guam	Guam Basketball Confederation	Men's; U19; U17; U15; Women's; U19; U17; U15	1974
Kiribati	Kiribati Basketball Association	Men's; U19; U17; U15; Women's; U19; U17; U15	1987
Marshall Islands	Rep. of the Marshall Islands Basketball Federation Inc.	Men's; U19; U17; U15; Women's; U19; U17; U15	1987
Micronesia	Federated States of Micronesia Basketball Association	Men's; U19; U17; U15; Women's; U19; U17; U15	1986
Nauru	Nauru Basketball Association	Men's; U19; U17; U15; Women's; U19; U17; U15	1975
New Caledonia	Région Fédérale de Nouvelle Calédonie de Basketball	Men's; U19; U17; U15; Women's; U19; U17; U15	1974
New Zealand	Basketball New Zealand	Men's; U19; U17; U15; Women's; U19; U17; U15	1951
Norfolk Island	Norfolk Island Basketball Association	Men's; U19; U17; U15; Women's; U19; U17; U15	1999
Northern Mariana Islands	Basketball Association of the Northern Mariana Islands	Men's; U19; U17; U15; Women's; U19; U17; U15	1981
Palau	Palau Amateur Basketball Association	Men's; U19; U17; U15; Women's; U19; U17; U15	1988
Papua New Guinea	Basketball Federation of Papua New Guinea	Men's; U19; U17; U15; Women's; U19; U17; U15	1963
Samoa	Samoa Basketball Association	Men's; U19; U17; U15; Women's; U19; U17; U15	1982
Solomon Islands	Solomon Islands Amateur Basketball Federation	Men's; U19; U17; U15; Women's; U19; U17; U15	1987
Tahiti	Fédération Tahitienne de Basketball	Men's; U19; U17; U15; Women's; U19; U17; U15	1960
Timor-Leste	National Basketball Federation of Timor-Leste	Men's; U19; U17; U15; Women's; U19; U17; U15	2013
Tonga	Tonga Basketball Federation	Men's; U19; U17; U15; Women's; U19; U17; U15	1987
Tuvalu	Tuvalu Basketball Association	Men's; U19; U17; U15; Women's; U19; U17; U15	1987
Vanuatu	Vanuatu Amateur Basketball Federation	Men's; U19; U17; U15; Women's; U19; U17; U15	1966

== Rankings ==
FIBA World Ranking – Men (as of Mar 3, 2026)
#	FIBA	+/-	National team	Points
1.	6.	Steady	Australia	778.5
2.	24.	▲1	New Zealand	474.2
3.	77.	▲2	Guam	146.6
4.	126.	Steady	Samoa	64.4
5.	137.	Steady	Tahiti	53.4
6.	139.	Steady	Tonga	52.2
7.	142.	Steady	American Samoa	49.1
8.	147.	Steady	Fiji	41.3
9.	155.	Steady	Cook Islands	25.6
10.	157.	Steady	Papua New Guinea	8.9
11.	158.	Steady	Solomon Islands	8
12.	159.	Steady	New Caledonia	6.4
13.	160.	Steady	Vanuatu	5.4

FIBA World Ranking – Women (as of Apr 1, 2026)
#	FIBA	+/-	National team	Points
1.	3.	Steady	Australia	596.4
2.	21.	Steady	New Zealand	280.6
3.	101.	Steady	Cook Islands	45.5
4.	114.	Steady	Tahiti	24.8

FIBA World Ranking – Boys (as of Dec 13, 2025)
#	FIBA	+/-	National team	Points
1.	8.	▼1	Australia	664.8
2.	12.	▲3	New Zealand	611.1
3.	73.	▲14	Samoa	202.5
4.	76.	Steady	Fiji	189.5
5.	80.	▲21	Guam	181.4
6.	92.	▼2	Tahiti	126.7
7.	100.	▲5	Cook Islands	96.1
8.	101.	▲1	Papua New Guinea	89
9.	104.	▼5	New Caledonia	87.7
10.	105.	▼1	Palau	70.8
11.	109.	▼1	Marshall Islands	36.8

FIBA World Ranking – Girls (as of Dec 13, 2025)
#	FIBA	+/-	National team	Points
1.	4.	▲1	Australia	714.6
1.	20.	▲4	New Zealand	517.8
3.	60.	▼16	Samoa	219.2
4.	62.	▲38	Cook Islands	217.5
5.	64.	Steady	Fiji	201.3
6.	85.	▼7	Tahiti	138.4
7.	85.	Steady	Tonga	126.8
8.	89.	▲2	Guam	117.4
9.	95.	▼7	New Caledonia	100.8
10.	99.	▼3	Papua New Guinea	91.3
11.	100.	▼1	Marshall Islands	82.1
12.	105.	▼2	Palau	47.9

== Competitions ==
=== Organized by FIBA Oceania ===
- FIBA Oceania Championship (discontinued 2015)
- FIBA Oceania Women's Championship (discontinued 2015)
- FIBA Oceania Youth Tournament (Under-20) (discontinued 2010)
- FIBA Oceania Women's Youth Tournament (Under-20) (discontinued 2010)
- FIBA U17 Oceania Cup
- FIBA U17 Women's Oceania Cup
- FIBA U15 Oceania Cup
- FIBA U15 Women's Oceania Cup

==== Current champions ====
	U17 Men	U17 Women	U15 Men	U15 Women
Last edition	2025	2025	2024	2024
Champions	New Zealand	Australia	Australia	Australia

==== The last champions of the discontinued tournaments ====
	Men	Women	U20 Men	U20 Women
Last edition	2015	2015	2010	2010
Champions	Australia	Australia	Australia	Australia

=== Organized by FIBA Oceania subzones ===
- FIBA Melanesian Cup
- FIBA Micronesian Cup
- FIBA Polynesian Cup

==== Current champions ====
	FIBA Melanesian Cup		FIBA Micronesian Cup		FIBA Polynesian Cup	
	Men	Women	Men	Women	Men	Women
Last edition	2025	2025	2026	2026	2022	2022
Champions	Papua New Guinea	Fiji	F.S. Micronesia	Guam	Tahiti	Cook Islands
