= Australia men's national under-19 basketball team =

Australia
- FIBA ranking: 7 ▼3 (December 2024)
- National federation: Basketball Australia
- Coach: Darren Perry
- Nickname: Emus

U19 World Cup
- Appearances: 16
- Medals: Gold: 1 (2003); Silver: 1 (1995)

U18 Asia Cup
- Appearances: 3
- Medals: Gold: 3 (2018, 2024, 2026)

U17 Oceania Cup
- Appearances: 10
- Medals: Gold: 8 (2002, 2008, 2010, 2012, 2014, 2017, 2019, 2023); Silver: 2 (2016, 2025)
Home	Away

The Australia men's national under-17, under-18 and under-19 basketball team is the junior men's basketball side that represents Australia in international under-17, under-18 and under-19 youth basketball competitions. Nicknamed the Emus, the team is governed by the Australian Basketball Federation Inc.

The Emus' greatest accomplishment was winning the 2003 FIBA Under-19 World Championship.

== Tournament record ==
=== U19 World Cup ===
Year	Result	Pld	W	L
(Brazil) 1979	9th	8	4	4
(Spain) 1983	10th	7	4	3
(Italy) 1987	5th	7	4	3
(Canada) 1991	11th	8	5	3
(Greece) 1995	2nd	8	7	1
(Portugal) 1999	5th	8	5	3
(Greece) 2003	1st	8	7	1
(Serbia) 2007	5th	9	8	1
(New Zealand) 2009	4th	9	7	2
(Latvia) 2011	6th	9	6	3
(Czech Republic) 2013	4th	9	4	5
(Greece) 2015	7th	7	3	4
(Egypt) 2017	Did not qualify			
(Greece) 2019	9th	7	5	2
(Latvia) 2021	10th	7	3	4
(Hungary) 2023	Did not participate			
(Switzerland) 2025	6th	7	4	3
(Czech Republic) 2027	Qualified			
(Indonesia) 2029	To be determined			
Total	16/19	118	76	42

=== U18 Asia Cup ===
Year	Result
2018	1st place, gold medalist(s)
2024	1st place, gold medalist(s)
2026	1st place, gold medalist(s)

=== U17/U18 Oceania Cup ===
Year	Result
2006	1st place, gold medalist(s)
2008	1st place, gold medalist(s)
2010	1st place, gold medalist(s)
2012	1st place, gold medalist(s)
2014	1st place, gold medalist(s)
2016	2nd place, silver medalist(s)
2017	1st place, gold medalist(s)
2019	1st place, gold medalist(s)
2023	1st place, gold medalist(s)
2025	2nd place, silver medalist(s)

== Current roster ==
Final 12-man roster for the 2021 FIBA Under-19 Basketball World Cup.

Australia men's national under-19 basketball team – 2021 FIBA Under-19 Basketball World Cup roster
Players
Coaches

Pos.	No.	Name	Age – Date of birth	Height	Club	Ctr.
PG	4	Taran Armstrong	19 – 15 January 2002	1.95 m (6 ft 5 in)
G	5	Biwali Bayles	19 – 15 February 2002	1.88 m (6 ft 2 in)	Sydney Kings	(Australia)
PG	6	Reyne Smith	18 – 28 October 2002	1.86 m (6 ft 1 in)
G	7	Tamuri Wigness	19 – 26 March 2002	1.80 m (5 ft 11 in)	Brisbane Bullets	(Australia)
G	8	Jaylin Galloway	18 – 21 December 2002	1.97 m (6 ft 6 in)	Sydney Kings	(Australia)
F	9	Blake Jones	19 – 28 February 2002	2.04 m (6 ft 8 in)	Brisbane Bullets	(Australia)
PF	10	Bol Dengdit	18 – 21 February 2003	2.10 m (6 ft 11 in)
PG	11	Dyson Daniels	18 – 17 March 2003	1.97 m (6 ft 6 in)	NBA G League Ignite	(United States)
F	12	Toluwaleyi Adebayo	19 – 9 March 2002	2.02 m (6 ft 8 in)
C	13	Akoldah Gak	18 – 12 July 2002	2.10 m (6 ft 11 in)	Illawarra Hawks	(Australia)
PF	14	David Okwera	18 – 31 July 2002	2.03 m (6 ft 8 in)
C	15	Yaak Yaak	16 – 6 August 2004	2.10 m (6 ft 11 in)

Head coach

- (Australia) Darren Perry

Legend

- (C) Team captain
- (NP) Naturalized player
- Club – describes last
  club before the tournament
- Age – describes age
  on 3 July 2021

=== Head coaches ===
- (Australia) Adam Caporn - 2015
- (Australia) Darren Perry - 2018–present

== See also ==
- Australia men's national basketball team
- Australia men's national under-17 basketball team
- Australia women's national basketball team
- Australia women's national under-19 basketball team
- Australia women's national under-17 basketball team
- Australia men's national wheelchair basketball team
- Australia women's national wheelchair basketball team
