= SEABA Under-18 Championship for Women =

Southeast Asian women's basketball championship

- Current season, competition or edition: 2026 SEABA Under-18 Championship for Women
- Founded: 2014
- Country: SEABA member nations
- Continent: FIBA Asia (Asia)
- Most recent champion: Philippines (2nd title)
- Most titles: Philippines (2 titles)

The SEABA Under-18 Championship for Women is an under-18 basketball championship in the International Basketball Federation's Southeast Asia Basketball Association, one of FIBA Asia's subzone. The event commenced in 2014 and supposed to be held bi-annually. The winners represent SEABA in the FIBA Under-18 Women's Asia Cup Division B starting the 2024 edition.

== Summary ==
| Year | Host | Final | | | Third Place Game | | |
| Year | Host | Champion | Score | Second Place | Third Place | Score | Fourth Place |
| 2014; Details | (Indonesia); Semarang | Malaysia | 68–55 | Singapore | Indonesia | No playoffs | No other teams |
| 2024; Details | (Thailand); Ratchaburi | Philippines | No playoffs | Thailand | Indonesia | No playoffs | Malaysia |
| 2026; Details | (Philippines); Bacolod | Philippines | No playoffs | Indonesia | Singapore | No playoffs | Vietnam |

== Medal table ==
| Rank | Nation | Gold | Silver | Bronze | Total |
|---|---|---|---|---|---|
| 1 | Philippines | 2 | 0 | 0 | 2 |
| 2 | Malaysia | 1 | 0 | 0 | 1 |
| 3 | Indonesia | 0 | 1 | 2 | 3 |
| 4 | Singapore | 0 | 1 | 1 | 2 |
| 5 | Thailand | 0 | 1 | 0 | 1 |
| Totals (5 entries) | | 3 | 3 | 3 | 9 |
