= 2026 SEABA Under-18 Championship for Women =

2026 SEABA U-18 Championship for Women
3rd FIBA Under-18 Women's Asia Cup SEABA Qualifiers

Tournament details
- Host country: Philippines
- City: Bacolod
- Dates: 2–6 June
- Teams: 5 (from 1 sub-confederation)
- Venue: 1 (in 1 host city)

Final positions
- Champions: Philippines (2nd title)
- Runners-up: Indonesia
- Third place: Singapore

Tournament statistics
- MVP: (Philippines) Rhiane Perez
- Top scorer: (Philippines) Tiffany Reyes (13.3)
- Top rebounds: (Singapore) Hui Jun Ayeni (10.3)
- Top assists: (Philippines) Sophia Dignadice (5.5)
- PPG (Team): Philippines (87.5)
- RPG (Team): Philippines (57.8)
- APG (Team): Philippines (25.0)

The 2026 SEABA Under-18 Championship for Women, also known as 2026 FIBA U18 Women's Asia Cup SEABA Qualifiers, was the third edition of SEABA basketball championship for young women aged 18 and under. The qualifying tournament for the 2026 FIBA U18 Women's Asia Cup, it was held in Bacolod, Philippines, from 2 to 6 June 2026. This was the first time the Philippines hosted the event.

The Philippines successfully defended their SEABA U18 title won in 2024, by sweeping the competition by an average margin of 36.3 points per game, with a victory over Indonesia in the final, 88–62. The host country already qualified to the Division A of 2026 FIBA U18 Women's Asia Cup, so the lone SEABA berth for Division B was given to the runner-up.

== Round robin ==
All times are local (Philippine Standard Time; UTC+8).

Pos	Team	Pld	W	L	PF	PA	PD	Pts	Final result
1	Philippines (H)	4	4	0	350	205	+145	8	Gold medal
2	Indonesia	4	3	1	276	222	+54	7	Silver medal
3	Singapore	4	2	2	218	238	−20	6	Bronze medal
4	Vietnam	4	1	3	178	272	−94	5	
5	Thailand	4	0	4	189	274	−85	4	

Source: FIBA
Rules for classification: (1) Tournament points, (2) Head-to-head tournament points, (3) Head-to-head goal average, (4) Overall goal average, (5) Drawing of lots
(H) Hosts

2 June 2026
16:00

FIBA Live Stats Live Stats

Indonesia	66–49	Singapore
Scoring by quarter: 15–11, 17–8, 17–11, 17–19
Pts: Chayyra 14; Rebs: Rahiesa 7 Asts: Welly 5		Pts: Sazali 15; Rebs: Ayeni 13; Asts: Lau 5

STI West Negros University Gym, Bacolod
Referees: Lee Ji Youn (KOR), Pham Trung Kien Le (VIE), Janine Nicandro (PHI)

2 June 2026
19:00

FIBA Live Stats Live Stats

Philippines	93–42	Vietnam
Scoring by quarter: 19–14, 26–7, 19–12, 29–9
Pts: Perez 16; Rebs: Rosano 8 Asts: Oñate 7		Pts: Nguyễn H.A., Ralph Le Chi 11; Rebs: Nguyễn H.T.H. 7 Asts: Võ 3

STI West Negros University Gym, Bacolod
Referees: Mandy Sing Tong Ngieng (MAS), Ong Jin Leong (SGP), Clara Monica (INA)

3 June 2026
16:00

FIBA Live Stats Live Stats

Vietnam	55–48	Thailand
Scoring by quarter: 18–6, 10–8, 16–20, 11–14
Pts: Ralph Le Chi 14; Rebs: Do H.T., Nguyễn H.T.H. 10; Asts: Nguyễn H.A. 6		Pts: Trakulvera 17; Rebs: Trakulvera 8 Asts: Bamroechit 5

STI West Negros University Gym, Bacolod
Referees: Ong Jin Leong (SGP), Mandy Sing Tong Ngieng (MAS), Manuel Felix Jr. (PHI)

3 June 2026
19:00

FIBA Live Stats Live Stats

Singapore	53–83	Philippines
Scoring by quarter: 17–18, 10–24, 15–23, 11–18
Pts: Ayeni 10; Rebs: Ayeni 9 Asts: Ayeni 4		Pts: Reyes 18; Rebs: Singson 8 Asts: Dignadice 7

STI West Negros University Gym, Bacolod
Referees: Lee Ji Youn (KOR), Chitchanok Srisawat (THA), Clara Monica (INA)

4 June 2026
16:00

FIBA Live Stats Live Stats

Indonesia	81–32	Vietnam
Scoring by quarter: 15–8, 18–7, 26–10, 22–7
Pts: Widjaja 14; Rebs: Valerie, Celesta 10; Asts: Blessed 6		Pts: Võ 8 Rebs: Nguyễn T.M. 6 Asts: Nguyễn T.M. 3

STI West Negros University Gym, Bacolod
Referees: Mandy Sing Tong Ngieng (MAS), Janine Nicandro (PHI), Chitchanok Srisawat (THA)

4 June 2026
19:00

FIBA Live Stats Live Stats

Philippines	86–48	Thailand
Scoring by quarter: 20–6, 22–18, 25–9, 19–15
Pts: Pinuela 16; Rebs: Perez 10; Asts: Dignadice 8		Pts: Hookee, Chanasimma 9 Rebs: Trakulvera 7 Asts: Bamroechit 4

STI West Negros University Gym, Bacolod
Referees: Lee Ji Youn (KOR), Clara Monica (INA), Pham Trung Kien Le (VIE)

5 June 2026
16:00

FIBA Live Stats Live Stats

Vietnam	49–50	Singapore
Scoring by quarter: 12–16, 21–10, 11–12, 5–12
Pts: Nguyễn V.M.H. 11; Rebs: Đỗ H.T. 6 Asts: Võ 4		Pts: Ayeni 15; Rebs: Elessa 17; Asts: Sazali 6

STI West Negros University Gym, Bacolod
Referees: Lee Ji Youn (KOR), Manuel Felix Jr. (PHI), Chitchanok Srisawat (THA)

5 June 2026
19:00

Live Stats Live Stats

Thailand	53–67	Indonesia
Scoring by quarter: 12–20, 14–9, 10–15, 17–23
Pts: Boonsub, Chanasimma 10; Rebs: Tuukkanen 13; Asts: Bamroechit 6		Pts: Blessed 13; Rebs: Valerie 11; Asts: Chayyara 6

STI West Negros University Gym, Bacolod
Referees: Mandy Sing Tong Ngieng (MAS), Ong Jin Leong (SGP), Pham Trung Kien Le (VIE)

6 June 2026
15:00

FIBA Live Stats Live Stats

Singapore	66–40	Thailand
Scoring by quarter: 18–7, 18–10, 18–8, 12–15
Pts: Ayeni 17; Rebs: Ayeni 12; Asts: Sazali 7		Pts: Chanasimma 10; Rebs: Baithong 8 Asts: Rueangsiri 4

STI West Negros University Gym, Bacolod
Referees: Janine Nicandro (PHI), Clara Monica (INA), Manuel Felix Jr. (PHI)

6 June 2026
18:00

FIBA Live Stats Live Stats

Indonesia	62–88	Philippines
Scoring by quarter: 14–25, 14–32, 17–17, 17–14
Pts: Welly 18; Rebs: Celesta 8 Asts: Chayyara, Welly 3		Pts: Perez 18; Rebs: Rosano 9 Asts: Rosano 5

STI West Negros University Gym, Bacolod
Referees: Lee Ji Youn (KOR), Mandy Sing Tong Ngieng (MAS), Chitchanok Srisawat (THA)

== Final standings ==
Rank	Team
Gold medal	Philippines
Silver medal	Indonesia
Bronze medal	Singapore
4	Vietnam
5	Thailand

Already qualified for the 2026 FIBA U18 Women's Asia Cup Division A before the tournament
Qualified for the 2026 FIBA U18 Women's Asia Cup Division B
Qualified for the 2026 FIBA U18 Women's Asia Cup Division B as hosts

== Awards ==
- Most Valuable Player: (Philippines) Rhiane Perez
- Sportsmanship Award: (Thailand) Kanyaphat Hookee

2026 SEABA Under-18 Women's Championship winners

Philippines
Second title
