= Philippines women's national under-18 basketball team =

Philippines
- FIBA ranking: 45 ▼2 (13 December 2025)
- Joined FIBA: 1936
- FIBA zone: FIBA Asia
- National federation: Samahang Basketbol ng Pilipinas
- Coach: Sandy Arespacochaga
- Nickname: Gilas Youth

U19 World Cup
- Appearances: None

U18 Asia Cup
- Appearances: 15
- Medals: Bronze: 2 (1972, 1978)

U18 Asia Cup Division B
- Appearances: 2
- Medals: Gold: 1 (2024); Bronze: 1 (2022)

U18 SEABA Championship
- Appearances: 2
- Medals: Gold: 2 (2024, 2026)
Home	Away

The Philippines women's national under-18 basketball team is a national basketball team of the Philippines, administered by the Samahang Basketbol ng Pilipinas. It represents the country in international under-18 women's basketball competitions.

The Philippines has hosted the FIBA Under-18 Women's Asia Cup six times when the tournament was still known as the ABC Junior Championship for Women namely in 1972, 1974, 1978, 1982, 1986, and 1989.

The current program has been active since 2022 after it was revived from ten years of inactivity.

== Competitive record ==
=== FIBA U18 Women's Asia Cup ===
FIBA U18 Women's Asia Cup record
Year	Division A				Division B			
Year	Position	Pld	W	L	Position	Pld	W	L
(South Korea) 1970	Did not participate				No Division B / Level II			
(Philippines) 1972	3rd place	4	0	4	No Division B / Level II			
(Philippines) 1974	4th place				No Division B / Level II			
(Kuwait) 1977	7th place				No Division B / Level II			
(Philippines) 1978	3rd place				No Division B / Level II			
(Thailand) 1980	Did not participate				No Division B / Level II			
(Philippines) 1982	4th place				No Division B / Level II			
(South Korea) 1984	6th place	5	2	3	No Division B / Level II			
(Philippines) 1986	6th place				No Division B / Level II			
(Philippines) 1989	9th place				No Division B / Level II			
(Japan) 1990	Did not participate				No Division B / Level II			
(China) 1992	8th place				No Division B / Level II			
(Thailand) 1996	11th place	6	1	5	No Division B / Level II			
(Japan) 1998	11th place	5	0	5	No Division B / Level II			
(India) 2000	Did not participate				No Division B / Level II			
(Taiwan) 2002	Did not participate				No Division B / Level II			
(China) 2004	9th place	Level II			4th place	4	1	3
(Thailand) 2007	Did not participate	Level II			Did not participate			
(Indonesia) 2008	8th place	Level II			2nd place	6	4	2
(Thailand) 2010	9th place	Level II			3rd place	5	3	2
(Malaysia) 2012	Did not participate	Level II			Did not participate			
(Jordan) 2014	Did not participate	Level II			Did not participate			
(Thailand) 2016	Did not participate	Level II			Did not participate			
(India) 2018	Did not participate	Division B			Did not participate			
(India) 2022	11th place	Division B			3rd place	5	4	1
(China) 2024	9th place	Division B			1st place	4	4	0
(Malaysia) 2026	6th place	5	1	4	Division A			

=== SEABA U18 Championship ===
SEABA Under-18 Championship for Women
Year	Position	Pld	W	L
(Indonesia) 2014	Did not participate			
(Thailand) 2024	1st place	3	3	0
(Philippines) 2026	1st place	4	4	0
Total	2 golds	7	7	0

== Current roster ==
Philippines roster at the 2026 FIBA U18 Women's Asia Cup.

Philippines Women's Under-18 National Basketball Team roster
Players
Coaches

Pos.	No.	Name	Age – Date of birth	Height	Club	Ctr.
PF	2	Maria Zuzzane Singson	16 – 2 December 2009	1.73 m (5 ft 8 in)	National University (Philippines)	(Philippines)
SG	7	Rhiane Meshelle Perez	17 – 9 February 2009	1.70 m (5 ft 7 in)	University of Santo Tomas	(Philippines)
C	8	Ruiza Jhane Olmos	16 – 12 November 2009	1.75 m (5 ft 9 in)	National University (Philippines)	(Philippines)
SG	9	Lea Pinuela	16 – 10 December 2009	1.61 m (5 ft 3 in)	University of Santo Tomas	(Philippines)
G	10	Grace Marina Curley	17 – 3 March 2009	1.81 m (5 ft 11 in)	Saint Francis High School (Mountain View, California)	(Philippines)
PG	11	Zia Jan Oñate	13 – 24 January 2013	1.65 m (5 ft 5 in)	National University (Philippines)	(Philippines)
PG	15	Scarlett Montana Mercado	18 – 15 July 2008	1.67 m (5 ft 6 in)	Athens Christian School	(Philippines)
C	20	Alyza Gozon	16 – 20 May 2010	1.73 m (5 ft 8 in)	Calinog National Comprehensive High School	(Philippines)
PG	21	KJ Guada Dave Badajos	17 – 21 December 2008	1.65 m (5 ft 5 in)	National University (Philippines)	(Philippines)
F	22	Brianna Faye Katigbak	16 – 25 November 2009	1.75 m (5 ft 9 in)	National University (Philippines)	(Philippines)
SG	24	Tiffany Anne Reyes	16 – 24 September 2010	1.87 m (6 ft 2 in)	Sycamore High School (Cincinnati, Ohio)	(Philippines)
G	25	Zaydhen Rosano	17 – 9 October 2008	1.63 m (5 ft 4 in)	National University (Philippines)	(Philippines)

Head coach

- (Philippines) Sandy Arespacochaga

Assistant coach(es)

- (Philippines) Aileen Lebornio

Legend

- Club – describes last
  club before the tournament
- Age describes age
  on 4 October 2026

== Past rosters ==
=== 2026 FIBA U18 Women's Asia Cup SEABA Qualifiers ===
Philippines roster at the 2026 FIBA U18 Women's Asia Cup SEABA Qualifiers.

Philippines Women's Under-18 National Basketball Team roster
Players
Coaches

Pos.	No.	Name	Age – Date of birth	Height	Club	Ctr.
PF	2	Maria Zuzzane Singson	16 – 2 December 2009	1.73 m (5 ft 8 in)	National University (Philippines)	(Philippines)
PG	3	Audry Kate Duma	17 – 21 March 2009	1.56 m (5 ft 1 in)	University of Santo Tomas	(Philippines)
SG	7	Rhiane Meshelle Perez	17 – 9 February 2009	1.70 m (5 ft 7 in)	University of Santo Tomas	(Philippines)
C	8	Ruiza Jhane Olmos	16 – 12 November 2009	1.75 m (5 ft 9 in)	National University (Philippines)	(Philippines)
SG	9	Lea Pinuela	16 – 10 December 2009	1.61 m (5 ft 3 in)	University of Santo Tomas	(Philippines)
PG	11	Zia Jan Oñate	13 – 24 January 2013	1.65 m (5 ft 5 in)	National University (Philippines)	(Philippines)
PG	12	Sophia Dignadice	18 – 26 May 2008	1.70 m (5 ft 7 in)		(Philippines)
PF	18	Naima Navarro	18 – 15 May 2008	1.70 m (5 ft 7 in)	De La Salle Santiago Zobel School	(Philippines)
F	22	Brianna Faye Katigbak	16 – 25 November 2009	1.75 m (5 ft 9 in)	National University (Philippines)	(Philippines)
SG	24	Tiffany Anne Reyes	15 – 24 September 2010	1.87 m (6 ft 2 in)	Sycamore High School (Cincinnati, Ohio)	(Philippines)
G	25	Zaydhen Rosano	17 – 9 October 2008	1.63 m (5 ft 4 in)	National University (Philippines)	(Philippines)
F	76	Gwyneth Zoe Peje	17 – 11 July 2008	1.76 m (5 ft 9 in)	Far Eastern University	(Philippines)

Head coach

- (Philippines) Sandy Arespacochaga

Assistant coach(es)

- (Philippines) Aileen Lebornio

Legend

- Club – describes last
  club before the tournament
- Age describes age
  on 2 June 2026

=== 2024 FIBA Under-18 Women's Asia Cup ===
Philippines roster at the 2024 FIBA Under-18 Women's Asia Cup.

Philippines Women's Under-18 National Basketball Team roster
Players
Coaches

Pos.	No.	Name	Age – Date of birth	Height	Club	Ctr.
G	2	Naomi Panganiban	18 – 5 June 2006	1.63 m (5 ft 4 in)
G	3	Ava Fajardo	16 – 3 October 2007	1.63 m (5 ft 4 in)	New Jersey Rise	(United States)
PF	4	Gabriella Ramos	17 – 6 April 2007	1.83 m (6 ft 0 in)
G	9	Alyssa Rodriguez	16 – 21 October 2007	1.74 m (5 ft 9 in)
SF	13	Jolzyne Impreso	17 – 13 September 2006	1.76 m (5 ft 9 in)
G	14	Christina Lapasaran	17 – 10 February 2007	1.57 m (5 ft 2 in)	National University	(Philippines)
C	21	Ashlyn Abong	17 – 21 September 2006	1.80 m (5 ft 11 in)	National University	(Philippines)
SG	24	Tiffany Reyes	13 – 24 September 2010	1.87 m (6 ft 2 in)	De La Salle Santiago Zobel School	(Philippines)
PF	26	Margarette Duenas	18 – 26 February 2006	1.78 m (5 ft 10 in)
SG	27	Alicia Villanueva	18 – 27 April 2006	1.68 m (5 ft 6 in)	National University	(Philippines)
SF	29	Sophia Canindo	16 – 29 June 2007	1.78 m (5 ft 10 in)
SG	77	Venice Quinte	17 – 10 June 2007	1.71 m (5 ft 7 in)	University of Santo Tomas	(Philippines)

Head coach

- (Philippines) Julie Amos

Assistant coach(es)

- (Philippines) Patrick Aquino

Legend

- Club – describes last
  club before the tournament
- Age describes age
  on 24 June 2024

=== 2022 FIBA U18 Women's Asian Championship ===
Philippines roster at the 2022 FIBA Under-18 Women's Asian Championship.

Philippines Women's Under-18 National Basketball Team roster
Players
Coaches

Pos.	No.	Name	Age – Date of birth	Height	Club	Ctr.
G	0	Ryhanna Lourdes Cassandra Calvert	16 – 27 August 2006	1.67 m (5 ft 6 in)	St. Thomas of Villanova	(Canada)
G	3	Kate Colyn Bobadilla	18 – 15 May 2004	1.70 m (5 ft 7 in)	Point Loma Nazarene University	(United States)
G	4	Kalynee Reigne Abraham	16 – 12 June 2006	1.71 m (5 ft 7 in)	Fil-Am Nation	(United States)
SG	5	Louna Ozar	18 – 9 May 2004	1.72 m (5 ft 8 in)	Fil-Am Nation	(United States)
PF	8	Princess BJ Marie Villarin	17 – 2 August 2005	1.68 m (5 ft 6 in)	National University	(Philippines)
G	9	Sumayah Sugapong	16 – 1 December 2005	1.72 m (5 ft 8 in)	Fil-Am Nation	(United States)
PF	11	Candice Alexie Udal	17 – 13 November 2004	1.77 m (5 ft 10 in)	Fil-Am Nation	(United States)
SG	12	Dianne Camille Nolasco	17 – 26 February 2005	1.60 m (5 ft 3 in)	Miriam College	(Philippines)
SG	15	Liane Ashley Loon	17 – 9 September 2004	1.72 m (5 ft 8 in)	Rochester Christian University	(United States)
G	20	Kristan Geyl Yumul	17 – 24 June 2005	1.75 m (5 ft 9 in)	Fil-Am Nation	(United States)
PF	42	Sydney Jane Heyn	16 – 28 December 2005	1.82 m (6 ft 0 in)	Westview High School	(United States)

Head coach

- (Philippines) Patrick Aquino

Assistant coach(es)

- (Philippines) José García

Legend

- Club – describes last
  club before the tournament
- Age describes age
  on 5 September 2022

=== 2010 FIBA Asia Under-18 Championship for Women ===
Philippines roster at the 2010 FIBA Asia Under-18 Championship for Women.

Philippines Women's Under-18 National Basketball Team roster
Players
Coaches

Pos.	No.	Name	Age – Date of birth	Height	Club	Ctr.
C	4	Danica Therese Jose	16 – 18 March 1994	1.85 m (6 ft 1 in)	Miriam College	(Philippines)
C	5	Trisha Angela Dy	16 – 19 October 1993	1.75 m (5 ft 9 in)	Jubilee Christian Academy	(Philippines)
G	6	Camille Claro	14 – 13 June 1996	1.58 m (5 ft 2 in)	Angelicum College	(Philippines)
G	7	Elrica Aniela Castro	17 – 11 January 1993	1.68 m (5 ft 6 in)	Assumption Antipolo	(Philippines)
G	8	Jacqueline Tanaman	–	1.63 m (5 ft 4 in)	Far Eastern University	(Philippines)
F	9	Lore Rivera	17 – 21 April 1993	1.73 m (5 ft 8 in)	University of Santo Tomas	(Philippines)
F	10	Marie Aseron	16 – 4 August 1993	1.70 m (5 ft 7 in)	University of Santo Tomas	(Philippines)
F	11	Regina Pioquinto	–	1.73 m (5 ft 8 in)	La Salle College Antipolo	(Philippines)
G	12	Maria Tantoco	17 – 4 June 1993	1.68 m (5 ft 6 in)	Poveda Learning Centre	(Philippines)
C	13	Nelia Sinsioco	16 – 4 August 1993	1.75 m (5 ft 9 in)	National University (Philippines)	(Philippines)
F	14	Alyanna Nitorreda	16 – 14 January 1994	1.73 m (5 ft 8 in)	Miriam College	(Philippines)
F	15	Alyanna Sabrina Ong	–	1.73 m (5 ft 8 in)	Southville International School and Colleges	(Philippines)

Head coach

- (Philippines) Patrick Aquino

Assistant coach(es)

- (Philippines) Paul Du
- (Philippines) Julie Amos

Legend

- Club – describes last
  club before the tournament
- Age describes age
  on 23 June 2010

=== 2008 FIBA Asia Under-18 Championship for Women ===
Philippines roster at the 2008 FIBA Asia Under-18 Championship for Women.

Philippines Women's Under-18 National Basketball Team roster
Players
Coaches

Pos.	No.	Name	Age – Date of birth	Height	Club	Ctr.
G		Katherine Sandel (c)	–	1.65 m (5 ft 5 in)	Adamson University	(Philippines)
G		Fria Bernardo	17 – 22 February 1991	1.65 m (5 ft 5 in)	Adamson University	(Philippines)
G/F		Khaterine Cecilia Mangahas	–	1.71 m (5 ft 7 in)	Adamson University	(Philippines)
G		Angelica Ortega	–	1.65 m (5 ft 5 in)	Adamson University	(Philippines)
F		Ana Versoza	–	1.72 m (5 ft 8 in)	Adamson University	(Philippines)
G		Agatha Marie Astrero	–	1.65 m (5 ft 5 in)	Far Eastern University	(Philippines)
F/C		Marilourd Socorro Borja	–	1.78 m (5 ft 10 in)	Far Eastern University	(Philippines)
F		Raiza Rose Palmera	17 – 21 November 1990	1.68 m (5 ft 6 in)	Far Eastern University	(Philippines)
C		Mary Joan Leviste	–	1.85 m (6 ft 1 in)	Far Eastern University	(Philippines)
F		Carmina Laguindanum	–	1.72 m (5 ft 8 in)	National University (Philippines)	(Philippines)
G/F		Cindy Resultay	17 – 31 December 1990	1.67 m (5 ft 6 in)	University of the East	(Philippines)
G		Allalaine Degomas	–	1.65 m (5 ft 5 in)	De La Salle University – Dasmariñas	(Philippines)

Head coach

- (Philippines) Raymond Celis

Legend

- (C) Team captain
- Club – describes last
  club before the tournament
- Age describes age
  on 2 November 2008

=== 2004 FIBA Asia Under-18 Championship for Women ===
Philippines roster at the 2004 FIBA Asia Under-18 Championship for Women.

Philippines Women's Under-18 National Basketball Team roster
Players
Coaches

Pos.	No.	Name	Age – Date of birth	Height	Club	Ctr.
		Angelica Marie Enriquez	–		Assumption College San Lorenzo	(Philippines)
		Elena Beatriz Santos	–		Assumption College San Lorenzo	(Philippines)
		Ma. Caterina del Lopa	–		Assumption College San Lorenzo	(Philippines)
C		Matchiko Matsuno	–	1.80 m (5 ft 11 in)	College of the Holy Spirit Manila	(Philippines)
		Kristine Alon-alon	–		De La Salle University	(Philippines)
		Hannah Candano	–		De La Salle University	(Philippines)
		Angeli Jo Gloriani	17 – 30 December 1986		De La Salle University	(Philippines)
		Anna Marika Iida	–		Florentino Torres High School	(Philippines)
		Fria Bernardo	13 – 22 February 1991		Florentino Torres High School	(Philippines)
		Ma. Annabel Sibug	–		Florentino Torres High School	(Philippines)
		Siella Millona	–		Trinity College of Quezon City	(Philippines)
		Bernadette Mercado	18 – 28 January 1986		Far Eastern University	(Philippines)

Head coach

- (Philippines) Estrellita Enriquez

Assistant coach(es)

- (Philippines) Shellalyn Gabagat
- (Philippines) Raymond Celis

Legend

- (C) Team captain
- Club – describes last
  club before the tournament
- Age describes age
  on 15 October 2004

== Head coaches ==
- (Philippines) Arlene Rodriguez (c. 1988–1988)
- (Philippines) Estrellita Enriquez (2004)
- (Philippines) Raymond Celis (2008)
- (Philippines) Patrick Aquino (2010)
- (Philippines) Julie Amos (2022–2026)
- (Philippines) Sandy Arespacochaga (2026–)

== See also ==
- Philippines women's national basketball team
- Philippines women's national under-16 basketball team
- Philippines men's national under-19 basketball team
