= 2014 SEABA Under-18 Championship for Women =

2014 SEABA U-18 Championship for Women
1st Southeast Asian Women's Basketball Championship
- Official logo of the 2014 SEABA Under-18 Championship for Women

Tournament details
- Host country: Indonesia
- Dates: May 26–29
- Teams: 3 (from 10 federations)
- Venue: 1 (in 1 host city)

Final positions
- Champions: Malaysia (1st title)

Tournament statistics
- Top scorer: (Malaysia) Lee P.L. (9.7)
- Top rebounds: (Indonesia) Lestari (10.0)
- Top assists: (Malaysia) Teo C.Y. (4.5)
- PPG (Team): Malaysia (64.0)
- RPG (Team): Malaysia (45.7)
- APG (Team): Malaysia (13.3)

The 2014 SEABA Under-18 Championship for Women was the maiden edition of SEABA Championship for young women ages eighteen (18) and below. The qualifying tournament for the 2014 FIBA Asia Under-18 Championship for Women, it was held in Semarang, Indonesia from May 26 to May 29.

Malaysia won their first SEABA Under-18 title after sweeping the tournament and defeating Singapore in the finals, 68–55.

== Round robin ==
Qualified for the Gold Medal Match

Team	Pld	W	L	PF	PA	PD	Pts
Malaysia	2	2	0	124	75	+49	4
Singapore	2	1	1	90	110	–20	3
Indonesia	2	0	2	87	116	–29	2

May 26
14:00

Live Stats

Indonesia	48–54	Singapore
Scoring by quarter: 13–19, 13–8, 11–13, 11–14
Pts: Lestari 9 Rebs: Astari, Lestari 8 Asts: Sari 4		Pts: Chan C.Y. 12; Rebs: Chan C.Y. 9 Asts: Chan C.Y. 4

GOR Sahabat, Semarang
Referees: Editha Botecario (PHI), Lim Sok Hoon (MAS), Chang Yee Chuan (MAS)

May 27
16:00

Live Stats

Malaysia	62–39	Indonesia
Scoring by quarter: 17–4, 11–12, 22–12, 12–11
Pts: Wong S.Q. 16; Rebs: Hiew 8 Asts: Teo C.Y. 6		Pts: Lestari 10; Rebs: Lestari 12; Asts: Wijaya 4

GOR Sahabat, Semarang
Referees: Watcharin Padungratchadakit (THA), Tan Geok Ling (SIN), Tan Yee Nee (SIN)

May 28
16:00

Live Stats

Singapore	36–62	Malaysia
Scoring by quarter: 8–16, 14–13, 10–11, 4–22
Pts: Lee 9 Rebs: Au Z.Y. 10; Asts: 6 players 1		Pts: Hiew 12; Rebs: Bee S.Y., Ng Y.F. 8 Asts: Bee S.Y., Wong S.Q. 3

GOR Sahabat, Semarang
Referees: Editha Botecario (PHI), Yuli Wullandari (INA), Donald Francis Quinn (INA)

== Final ==
May 29
16:00

Live Stats

Malaysia	68–55	Singapore
Scoring by quarter: 20–16, 15–12, 21–13, 12–14
Pts: Chia M.Y. 14; Rebs: Lee P.L., Lim 8 Asts: Khoo K.S., Tan H.Y., Teo C.Y. 3		Pts: Au Z.Y., Chan C.Y., Chin W.Q. 10; Rebs: Chua 11; Asts: 5 players 2

GOR Sahabat, Semarang
Referees: Sedyo Mukti Wibowo (INA), Rendra Lesmana (INA), Yuli Wullandari (INA)

== Final standings ==
Rank	Team
Gold medal	Malaysia
Silver medal	Singapore
Bronze medal	Indonesia

== Awards ==
2014 SEABA Under-18 champions

Malaysia
First title
