= China women's national under-19 basketball team =

China
- FIBA zone: FIBA Asia
- National federation: Basketball Association of the People's Republic of China

U19 World Cup
- Appearances: 16
- Medals: Bronze: 1 (2005)

U18 Asia Cup
- Appearances: 24
- Medals: Gold: 16 (1978, 1982, 1984, 1986, 1989, 1996, 1998, 2000, 2002, 2004, 2007, 2010, 2012, 2014, 2016, 2018); Silver: 6 (1977, 1980, 1992, 2008, 2022, 2024); Bronze: 2 (1990, 2026)
Home	Away

The China women's national under-18 and under-19 basketball team is a national basketball team of China, administered by the Basketball Association of the People's Republic of China. It represents the country in international under-18 and under-19 women's basketball competitions.

== Results ==
=== FIBA U19 Women's World Cup ===
Year	Pos.	Pld	W	L
(United States) 1985	4th	6	3	3
(Spain) 1989	9th	7	2	5
(South Korea) 1993	11th	7	2	5
(Brazil) 1997	7th	7	3	4
(Czech Republic) 2001	9th	7	3	4
(Tunisia) 2005	3rd place, bronze medalist(s)	8	6	2
(Slovakia) 2007	11th	8	3	5
(Thailand) 2009	11th	8	2	6
(Chile) 2011	9th	8	4	4
(Lithuania) 2013	5th	9	6	3
(Russia) 2015	7th	7	4	3
(Italy) 2017	7th	7	4	3
(Thailand) 2019	5th	7	5	2
(Hungary) 2021	Did not participate			
(Spain) 2023	13th	7	2	5
(Czech Republic) 2025	11th	7	2	5
(China) 2027	Qualified as host			
Total	16/17	110	51	59

=== FIBA U18 Women's Asia Cup ===
Year	Result
1970	Did not participate
1972	Did not participate
1974	Did not participate
1977	2nd place, silver medalist(s)
1978	1st place, gold medalist(s)
1980	2nd place, silver medalist(s)
1982	1st place, gold medalist(s)
1984	1st place, gold medalist(s)
1986	1st place, gold medalist(s)
1989	1st place, gold medalist(s)
1990	3rd place, bronze medalist(s)
1992	2nd place, silver medalist(s)
1996	1st place, gold medalist(s)
1998	1st place, gold medalist(s)

Year	Result
2000	1st place, gold medalist(s)
2002	1st place, gold medalist(s)
2004	1st place, gold medalist(s)
2007	1st place, gold medalist(s)
2008	2nd place, silver medalist(s)
2010	1st place, gold medalist(s)
2012	1st place, gold medalist(s)
2014	1st place, gold medalist(s)
2016	1st place, gold medalist(s)
2018	1st place, gold medalist(s)
2022	2nd place, silver medalist(s)
2024	2nd place, silver medalist(s)
2026	3rd place, bronze medalist(s)

== See also ==
- China women's national basketball team
- China women's national under-17 basketball team
- China men's national under-19 basketball team
