= Chinese Taipei women's national under-19 basketball team =

Chinese Taipei
- FIBA zone: FIBA Asia
- National federation: Chinese Taipei Basketball Association

U19 World Cup
- Appearances: 5
- Medals: None

U18 Asia Cup
- Appearances: 22
- Medals: Silver: 3 (1972, 1998, 2002); Bronze: 4 (1970, 1974, 1986, 2010)
| Home | Away |

The Chinese Taipei women's national under-18 and under-19 basketball team is a national basketball team of Republic of China (Taiwan), administered by the Chinese Taipei Basketball Association (Traditional Chinese: 中華台北籃球協會). It represents the country in international under-18 and under-19 women's basketball competitions.

== FIBA U18 Women's Asia Cup participations ==
| Year | Result |
|---|---|
| 1970 | 3rd place, bronze medalist(s) |
| 1972 | 2nd place, silver medalist(s) |
| 1974 | 3rd place, bronze medalist(s) |
| 1977 | Did not participate |
| 1978 | Did not participate |
| 1980 | Did not participate |
| 1982 | Did not participate |
| 1984 | Did not participate |
| 1986 | 3rd place, bronze medalist(s) |
| 1989 | 4th |
| 1990 | 4th |
| 1992 | 4th |
| 1996 | 4th |
| 1998 | 2nd place, silver medalist(s) |

| Year | Result |
|---|---|
| 2000 | 4th |
| 2002 | 2nd place, silver medalist(s) |
| 2004 | 4th |
| 2007 | 4th |
| 2008 | 4th |
| 2010 | 3rd place, bronze medalist(s) |
| 2012 | 4th |
| 2014 | 4th |
| 2016 | 4th |
| 2018 | 6th |
| 2022 | 4th |
| 2024 | 6th |
| 2026 | 5th |

== FIBA Under-19 Women's Basketball World Cup record ==
| Year | Pos. | Pld | W | L |
|---|---|---|---|---|
| (United States) 1985 | Did not qualify | | | |
| (Spain) 1989 | Did not qualify | | | |
| (South Korea) 1993 | 12th | 7 | 0 | 7 |
| (Brazil) 1997 | Did not qualify | | | |
| (Czech Republic) 2001 | Did not qualify | | | |
| (Tunisia) 2005 | Did not qualify | | | |
| (Slovakia) 2007 | Did not qualify | | | |
| (Thailand) 2009 | Did not qualify | | | |
| (Chile) 2011 | 11th | 8 | 3 | 5 |
| (Lithuania) 2013 | Did not qualify | | | |
| (Russia) 2015 | 14th | 7 | 2 | 5 |
| (Italy) 2017 | Did not qualify | | | |
| (Thailand) 2019 | Did not qualify | | | |
| (Hungary) 2021 | 14th | 7 | 1 | 6 |
| (Spain) 2023 | 15th | 7 | 1 | 6 |
| (Czech Republic) 2025 | Did not qualify | | | |
| (China) 2027 | Qualified | | | |
| Total | 6/17 | 36 | 7 | 29 |

== See also ==
- Chinese Taipei women's national basketball team
- Chinese Taipei women's national under-17 basketball team
- Chinese Taipei men's national under-19 basketball team
