= FIBA U18 Women's Asia Cup =

Women's under-18 basketball championship

- Current season, competition or edition: 2026 FIBA U18 Women's Asia Cup
- Formerly: ABC Junior Championship for Women, FIBA Asia Under-18 Championship for Women, FIBA U18 Women's Asian Championship
- Sport: Basketball
- Founded: 1970; 56 years ago
- First season: 1970
- Organizing body: FIBA Asia
- No. of teams: 16 (8 teams per Division)
- Countries: FIBA Asia and FIBA Oceania member nations
- Continent: Asia
- Most recent champion: Australia (3rd title)
- Most titles: China (16 titles)
- Qualification: FIBA Under-19 Women's Basketball World Cup
- Related competitions: FIBA U16 Women's Asia Cup
- Website: www.fiba.basketball/history (Division A) www.fiba.basketball/history (Division B)

The FIBA U18 Women's Asia Cup, formerly known as the Asian Basketball Confederation Junior Championship for Women, FIBA Asia Under-18 Championship for Women and FIBA U18 Women's Asian Championship, is an international under-18 basketball championship in the International Basketball Federation's FIBA Asia zone. The competition was inaugurated in 1970, and is held biennially. The top four teams qualify for the FIBA Under-19 Women's Basketball World Cup.

Because of the recent change in the FIBA Calendar and the inclusion of Australia and New Zealand in all Asian tournaments, a new competition format was introduced at the start of the 2018 edition. Aside from renaming the tournament to FIBA U18 Women's Asian Championship, it is now composed of two divisions (namely Divisions A and B) with a maximum of eight teams each to participate.

Division A teams now contest for the four slots allocated for the FIBA Under-19 Women's Basketball World Cup, meaning the semifinalists are assured of a seat in the U19 Worlds. Meanwhile, the team that places eighth and last in the division is relegated to Division B in the next tournament. The remaining top seven or eight teams are retained up to the next tournament as well.

Division B teams use the same format as that of Division A, but unlike the previous setup wherein there were qualifying matches for the top two teams of the division, only the Division Champions are promoted to Division A in the next tournament.

== Summary ==
=== Division A ===
Year	Host	Final			Third place game		
Year	Host	Gold	Score	Silver	Bronze	Score	Fourth place
1970; Details	(South Korea); Seoul	South Korea	round-robin	Japan	Taiwan	—	—
1972; Details	(Philippines); Manila	South Korea	round-robin	Taiwan	Philippines	—	—
1974; Details	(Philippines); Manila	South Korea	?	Japan	Taiwan	?	Philippines
1977; Details	Kuwait City	South Korea	?	China	Malaysia	?	Iran
1978; Details	(Philippines); Manila	China	?	Malaysia	Philippines	?	Hong Kong
1980; Details	(Thailand); Bangkok	South Korea	?	China	Thailand	?	India
1982; Details	(Philippines); Manila	China	?	South Korea	Japan	?	Philippines
1984; Details	(South Korea); Seoul	China	round-robin	South Korea	Japan	round-robin	Malaysia
1986; Details	(Philippines); Manila	China	94–70	South Korea	Chinese Taipei	?	Japan
1989; Details	(Philippines); Manila	China	82–74	South Korea	Japan	?	Chinese Taipei
1990; Details	(Japan); Nagoya	South Korea	80–78	Japan	China	72–50	Chinese Taipei
1992; Details	(China); Beijing	South Korea	?	China	Japan	?	Chinese Taipei
1996; Details	(Thailand); Bangkok	China	66–63	Japan	South Korea	77–76	Chinese Taipei
1998; Details	(Japan); Tokushima	China	81–40	Chinese Taipei	South Korea	46–43	Japan
2000; Details	(India); New Delhi	China	78–59	Japan	South Korea	67–64	Chinese Taipei
2002; Details	(Taiwan); Taipei	China	92–68	Chinese Taipei	South Korea	77–72	Japan
2004; Details	(China); Shenzhen	China	102–79	South Korea	Japan	57–52	Chinese Taipei
2007; Details	(Thailand); Bangkok	China	81–68	Japan	South Korea	89–70	Chinese Taipei
2008; Details	(Indonesia); Medan	Japan	90–87	China	South Korea	94–73	Chinese Taipei
2010; Details	(Thailand); Surat Thani	China	122–78	Japan	Chinese Taipei	78–54	South Korea
2012; Details	(Malaysia); Johor Bahru	China	60–53	Japan	South Korea	61–42	Chinese Taipei
2014; Details	(Jordan); Amman	China	66–60	Japan	South Korea	57–54	Chinese Taipei
2016; Details	(Thailand); Bangkok	China	78–47	Japan	South Korea	66–63	Chinese Taipei
2018; Details	(India); Bangalore	China	89–76	Japan	Australia	75–58	South Korea
2020	Cancelled due to the COVID-19 pandemic in Asia						
2022; Details	(India); Bangalore	Australia	81–55	China	Japan	77–45	Chinese Taipei
2024; Details	(China); Shenzhen	Australia	96–79	China	Japan	69–54	South Korea
2026; Details	(Malaysia); Seremban	Australia	83–82	Japan	China	106–69	South Korea
2028; Details	Kazakhstan		–			–	

=== Division B ===
Year	Host	Final			Third place game		
Year	Host	Gold	Score	Silver	Bronze	Score	Fourth place
2018; Details	(India); Bangalore	India	68–45	Kazakhstan	Syria	75–68	Hong Kong
2020	Cancelled due to the COVID-19 pandemic in Asia						
2022; Details	(India); Bangalore	Malaysia	64–53	Mongolia	Philippines	84–68	Samoa
2024; Details	(China); Shenzhen	Philippines	95–64	Lebanon	Samoa	64–59	Iran
2026; Details	(Thailand); Bangkok	Lebanon	58–39	Kazakhstan	Indonesia	70–50	India
2028; Details	Kazakhstan		–			–	

== Medal table ==
Division A

Rank	Nation	Gold	Silver	Bronze	Total
1	China	16	6	2	24
2	South Korea	7	5	9	21
3	Australia	3	0	1	4
4	Japan	1	12	7	20
5	Chinese Taipei	0	3	4	7
6	Malaysia	0	1	1	2
7	Philippines	0	0	2	2
8	Thailand	0	0	1	1
Totals (8 entries)		27	27	27	81

Division B

Rank	Nation	Gold	Silver	Bronze	Total
1	Lebanon	1	1	0	2
2	Philippines	1	0	1	2
3	India	1	0	0	1
3	Malaysia	1	0	0	1
5	Kazakhstan	0	2	0	2
6	Mongolia	0	1	0	1
7	Indonesia	0	0	1	1
7	Samoa	0	0	1	1
7	Syria	0	0	1	1
Totals (9 entries)		4	4	4	12

== Participation details ==
=== Tournaments 1970–2016 ===
Team	(South Korea) 1970	(Philippines) 1972	(Philippines) 1974	(Kuwait) 1977	(Philippines) 1978	(Thailand) 1980	(Philippines) 1982	(South Korea) 1984	(Philippines) 1986	(Philippines) 1989	(Japan) 1990	(China) 1992	(Thailand) 1996	(Japan) 1998	(India) 2000	(Taiwan) 2002	(China) 2004	(Thailand) 2007	(Indonesia) 2008	(Thailand) 2010	(Malaysia) 2012	(Jordan) 2014	(Thailand) 2016	Total
China				2nd	1st	2nd	1st	1st	1st	1st	3rd	2nd	1st	1st	1st	1st	1st	1st	2nd	1st	1st	1st	1st	20
Chinese Taipei	3rd	2nd	3rd						3rd	4th	4th	4th	4th	2nd	4th	2nd	4th	4th	4th	3rd	4th	4th	4th	18
Hong Kong					4th	7th	8th			11th	10th	10th	12th	7th	10th			10th	11th		8th	8th	9th	14
India						4th	6th			5th	6th		6th	9th	9th	7th	8th	7th	6th	8th	7th	6th	6th	15
Indonesia						8th					9th	7th							10th				7th	5
Iran				4th																				1
Japan	2nd		2nd			5th	3rd	3rd	4th	3rd	2nd	3rd	2nd	4th	2nd	4th	3rd	2nd	1st	2nd	2nd	2nd	2nd	20
Jordan													8th									11th		2
Kazakhstan																		9th	7th	6th	9th	10th	10th	6
Kuwait				8th																				1
Kyrgyzstan													7th	× (Note: Kyrgzystan and Thailand withdrew from the 1998 edition after the conduct of the draw but prior to the tournament.)								12th		2
Laos														12th						12th				2
Macau														10th		9th	10th							3
Malaysia				3rd	2nd	6th	5th	4th	5th	7th	7th	6th	9th	5th	7th	8th	7th	8th	5th	5th	6th	7th	8th	20
Mongolia																10th								1
North Korea															5th	5th								2
Philippines		3rd	4th	7th	3rd		4th	6th	6th	9th		8th	11th	11th			9th		8th	9th				14
Singapore								5th		8th							6th	5th	12th		10th		11th	7
South Korea	1st	1st	1st	1st		1st	2nd	2nd	2nd	2nd	1st	1st	3rd	3rd	3rd	3rd	2nd	3rd	3rd	4th	3rd	3rd	3rd	22
Sri Lanka				6th		9th		7th		10th	8th	9th	10th	8th	11th			12th		10th	11th	9th	12th	14
Syria																				11th				1
Thailand				5th		3rd	7th			6th	5th	5th	5th	×	6th	6th	5th	6th	9th	7th	5th	5th	5th	16
Uzbekistan														6th	8th									2
Vietnam																		11th						1
Total	3	3	4	8	4	9	8	7	6	11	10	10	12	12	11	10	10	12	12	12	11	12	12	

- Starting in 2018, a new tournament format was introduced; two divisions were created: Division A and Division B.

=== Division A ===
Team	(India) 2018	(India) 2022	(China) 2024	(Malaysia) 2026	(Kazakhstan) 2028	Total
Australia	3rd	1st	1st	1st	Q	4
China	1st	2nd	2nd	3rd	Q	4
Chinese Taipei	6th	4th	6th	5th	Q	4
India		8th				1
Indonesia	7th	7th	8th			3
Japan	2nd	3rd	3rd	2nd	Q	4
Lebanon					Q	1
Malaysia	8th		7th	8th		3
New Zealand	5th	6th	5th	7th	Q	4
Philippines				6th	Q	1
South Korea	4th	5th	4th	4th	Q	4
Total	8	8	8	8	8	

=== Division B ===
Team	(India) 2018	(India) 2022	(China) 2024	(Thailand) 2026	(Kazakhstan) 2028	Total
Cook Islands				7th		1
Guam	8th					1
Hong Kong	4th	7th	5th			3
India	1st			4th		2
Indonesia				3rd		1
Iran	5th		4th			2
Jordan		6th				1
Kazakhstan	2nd			2nd	Q	3
Kyrgyzstan			7th			1
Lebanon			2nd	1st		2
Malaysia		1st				1
Maldives		8th	6th			2
Mongolia		2nd				1
Oman				8th		1
Philippines		3rd	1st			2
Samoa	7th	4th	3rd	5th		4
Singapore	6th					1
Syria	3rd		× (Note: Syria forfeited first two of their group stage games before being disqualified)			1
Thailand		5th		6th		2
Total	8	8	8	8	8	

== Under-19 Women's World Cup record ==
Team	(United States) 1985	(Spain) 1989	(South Korea) 1993	(Brazil) 1997	(Czech Republic) 2001	(Tunisia) 2005	(Slovakia) 2007	(Thailand) 2009	(Chile) 2011	(Lithuania) 2013	(Russia) 2015	(Italy) 2017	(Thailand) 2019	(Hungary) 2021	(Spain) 2023	(Czech Republic) 2025	(China) 2027	Total
Australia	Part of FIBA Oceania												2nd	2nd	9th	2nd	Q	17
China	4th	9th	11th	7th	9th	3rd	11th	11th	9th	5th	7th	7th	5th	–	13th	11th	Q	16
Chinese Taipei	–	–	12th	–	–	–	–	–	11th	–	14th	–	–	14th	15th	–	Q	6
Japan	–	–	8th	12th	11th	–	13th	12th	7th	8th	DQ	4th	8th	9th	6th	6th	Q	13
South Korea	2nd	6th	4th	–	–	6th	8th	13th	–	13th	13th	15th	9th	13th	–	9th	Q	13
Thailand	–	–	–	–	–	–	–	16th	–	–	–	–	16th	–	–	–	–	2
Total	2	2	3+1	2	2	2	3	3+1	3	3	3	3	4+1	4	4	4	4+1	

== See also ==
- FIBA Women's Asia Cup
- FIBA U16 Women's Asia Cup
- FIBA U19 Women's World Cup
- FIBA U18 Asia Cup
