= Japan women's national under-19 basketball team =

Japan
- FIBA zone: FIBA Asia
- National federation: Japan Basketball Association
- Coach: Mikiko Hagiwara

U19 World Cup
- Appearances: 12

U18 Asia Cup
- Appearances: 24
- Medals: Gold: 1 (2008); Silver: 12 (1970, 1974, 1990, 1996, 2000, 2007, 2010, 2012, 2014, 2016, 2018, 2026); Bronze: 7 (1982, 1984, 1989, 1992, 2004, 2022, 2024)
Home	Away

The Japan women's national under-18 and under-19 basketball team is a national basketball team of Japan, administered by the Japan Basketball Association. It represents the country in international under-18 and under-19 women's basketball competitions.

At the 2019 FIBA Under-19 Women's Basketball World Cup, Japan finished 8th out of 16 overall. The team displayed some strong showings including its game against eventual bronze medalist Spain, where Japan won two of the four quarters.

== Results ==
=== FIBA U19 Women's World Cup ===
Year	Pos.	Pld	W	L
(United States) 1985	Did not qualify			
(Spain) 1989	Did not qualify			
(South Korea) 1993	8th	7	2	5
(Brazil) 1997	12th	7	0	7
(Czech Republic) 2001	11th	7	1	6
(Tunisia) 2005	Did not qualify			
(Slovakia) 2007	13th	5	2	3
(Thailand) 2009	12th	8	2	6
(Chile) 2011	7th	9	4	5
(Lithuania) 2013	8th	9	3	6
(Russia) 2015	Suspended			
(Italy) 2017	4th	7	5	2
(Thailand) 2019	8th	7	3	4
(Hungary) 2021	9th	7	4	3
(Spain) 2023	6th	7	5	2
(Czech Republic) 2025	6th	7	4	3
(China) 2027	Qualified			
Total	13/17	87	35	52

=== FIBA U18 Women's Asia Cup ===
Year	Result
1970	2nd place, silver medalist(s)
1972	Did not participate
1974	2nd place, silver medalist(s)
1977	Did not participate
1978	Did not participate
1980	5th
1982	3rd place, bronze medalist(s)
1984	3rd place, bronze medalist(s)
1986	4th
1989	3rd place, bronze medalist(s)
1990	2nd place, silver medalist(s)
1992	3rd place, bronze medalist(s)
1996	2nd place, silver medalist(s)

Year	Result
1998	4th
2000	2nd place, silver medalist(s)
2002	4th
2004	3rd place, bronze medalist(s)
2007	2nd place, silver medalist(s)
2008	1st place, gold medalist(s)
2010	2nd place, silver medalist(s)
2012	2nd place, silver medalist(s)
2014	2nd place, silver medalist(s)
2016	2nd place, silver medalist(s)
2018	2nd place, silver medalist(s)
2022	3rd place, bronze medalist(s)
2024	3rd place, bronze medalist(s)
2026	2nd place, silver medalist(s)

== See also ==
- Japan women's national basketball team
- Japan women's national under-17 basketball team
- Japan men's national under-19 basketball team
