= Kazakhstan women's national under-18 basketball team =

Kazakhstan
- FIBA zone: FIBA Asia
- National federation: Kazakhstan Basketball Federation

U19 World Cup
- Appearances: None

U18 Asia Cup
- Appearances: 6
- Medals: None

U18 Asia Cup Division B
- Appearances: 2
- Medals: Silver: 2 (2018, 2026)

The Kazakhstan women's national under-18 basketball team is a national basketball team of Kazakhstan, administered by the Kazakhstan Basketball Federation. It represents the country in international under-18 women's basketball competitions.

== FIBA U18 Women's Asia Cup participations ==
Year	Division A	Division B
2007	9th	
2008	7th	
2010	6th	
2012	9th	
2014	10th	
2016	10th	
2018		2nd place, silver medalist(s)
2026		2nd place, silver medalist(s)

== See also ==
- Kazakhstan women's national basketball team
- Kazakhstan women's national under-16 basketball team
- Kazakhstan men's national under-19 basketball team
