= Malaysia women's national under-18 basketball team =

Malaysia
- FIBA zone: FIBA Asia
- National federation: Malaysia Basketball Association

U19 World Cup
- Appearances: None

U18 Asia Cup
- Appearances: 23
- Medals: Silver: 1 (1978); Bronze: 1 (1977)

U18 Asia Cup Division B
- Appearances: 1
- Medals: Gold: 1 (2022)

The Malaysia women's national under-18 basketball team is a national basketball team of Malaysia, administered by the Malaysia Basketball Association. It represents the country in international under-18 women's basketball competitions.

== FIBA U18 Women's Asia Cup participations ==
Year	Division A
1970	Did not participate
1972	Did not participate
1974	Did not participate
1977	3rd place, bronze medalist(s)
1978	2nd place, silver medalist(s)
1980	6th
1982	5th
1984	4th
1986	5th
1989	7th
1990	7th
1992	6th
1996	9th
1998	5th

Year	Division A	Division B
2000	7th	
2002	8th	
2004	7th	
2007	8th	
2008	5th	
2010	5th	
2012	6th	
2014	7th	
2016	8th	
2018	8th	
2022		1st place, gold medalist(s)
2024	7th	
2026	8th	

== See also ==
- Malaysia women's national basketball team
- Malaysia women's national under-16 basketball team
- Malaysia men's national under-19 basketball team
