= South Korea women's national under-19 basketball team =

South Korea
- FIBA zone: FIBA Asia
- National federation: Korea Basketball Association

U19 World Cup
- Appearances: 12
- Medals: Silver: 1 (1985)

U18 Asia Cup
- Appearances: 26
- Medals: Gold: 7 (1970, 1972, 1974, 1977, 1980, 1990, 1992); Silver: 5 (1982, 1984, 1986, 1989, 2004); Bronze: 9 (1996, 1998, 2000, 2002, 2007, 2008, 2012, 2014, 2016)
Home	Away

The South Korea women's national under-18 and under-19 basketball team is a national basketball team of South Korea, administered by the Korea Basketball Association. It represents the country in international under-18 and under-19 women's basketball competitions.

== Results ==
=== FIBA U19 Women's World Cup ===
Year	Pos.	Pld	W	L
(United States) 1985	2nd place, silver medalist(s)	6	4	2
(Spain) 1989	6th	7	4	3
(South Korea) 1993	4th	7	4	3
(Brazil) 1997	Did not qualify			
(Czech Republic) 2001	Did not qualify			
(Tunisia) 2005	6th	8	4	4
(Slovakia) 2007	8th	9	3	6
(Thailand) 2009	13th	5	2	3
(Chile) 2011	Did not qualify			
(Lithuania) 2013	13th	6	3	3
(Russia) 2015	13th	7	2	5
(Italy) 2017	15th	7	1	6
(Thailand) 2019	9th	7	3	4
(Hungary) 2021	13th	7	3	4
(Spain) 2023	Did not qualify			
(Czech Republic) 2025	9th	7	3	4
(China) 2027	Qualified			
Total	13/17	83	36	47

=== FIBA U18 Women's Asia Cup ===
Year	Result
1970	1st place, gold medalist(s)
1972	1st place, gold medalist(s)
1974	1st place, gold medalist(s)
1977	1st place, gold medalist(s)
1978	DNP
1980	1st place, gold medalist(s)
1982	2nd place, silver medalist(s)
1984	2nd place, silver medalist(s)
1986	2nd place, silver medalist(s)
1989	2nd place, silver medalist(s)
1990	1st place, gold medalist(s)
1992	1st place, gold medalist(s)
1996	3rd place, bronze medalist(s)
1998	3rd place, bronze medalist(s)

Year	Result
2000	3rd place, bronze medalist(s)
2002	3rd place, bronze medalist(s)
2004	2nd place, silver medalist(s)
2007	3rd place, bronze medalist(s)
2008	3rd place, bronze medalist(s)
2010	4th
2012	3rd place, bronze medalist(s)
2014	3rd place, bronze medalist(s)
2016	3rd place, bronze medalist(s)
2018	4th
2022	5th
2024	4th
2026	4th

== See also ==
- South Korea women's national basketball team
- South Korea women's national under-17 basketball team
- South Korea men's national under-19 basketball team
