= North Korea women's national under-18 basketball team =

North Korea
- FIBA zone: FIBA Asia
- National federation: Amateur Basketball Association of DPR of Korea

U19 World Cup
- Appearances: None

U18 Asia Cup
- Appearances: 2 (2000, 2002)
- Medals: None

The North Korea women's national under-18 basketball team is a national basketball team of North Korea, administered by the Amateur Basketball Association of DPR of Korea. It represents the country in international under-18 women's basketball competitions.

== FIBA Under-18 Women's Asia Cup participations ==
Year	Result
2000	5th
2002	5th

== See also ==
- North Korea women's national basketball team
