= 2008 FIBA Asia Under-18 Championship for Women =

19th FIBA Under-18 Women's Asian Basketball Championship
- Official logo of the 2008 FIBA Asia Under-18 Championship for Women

Tournament details
- Host country: Indonesia
- City: Medan
- Dates: November 2–9
- Teams: 12 (from 1 confederation)
- Venue: 1 (in 1 host city)

Final positions
- Champions: Japan (1st title)
- Runners-up: China
- Third place: South Korea

FIBA Asia Under-18 Championship for Women 2008 is FIBA Asia's basketball championship for females under 18 years of age. The games were played in Medan, Indonesia, from November 2 to 9, 2008.

The championship is divided into two levels: Level I and Level II. The top three teams of Level I at the end of the tournament qualifies for the World U-19 Championship for Women. The two lowest finishers of Level I meets the top two finishers to determine which teams qualify for Level for 2010's championship. The losers are relegated to Level II.

== Participating teams ==
| Level I | Level II |
|---|---|
| China; Japan; South Korea; Chinese Taipei; Malaysia; India | Indonesia; Thailand; Philippines; Singapore; Hong Kong; Kazakhstan |

== Preliminary round ==
=== Level I ===
| Team | Pld | W | L | PF | PA | PD | Pts |
|---|---|---|---|---|---|---|---|
| Japan | 5 | 5 | 0 | 462 | 287 | +175 | 10 |
| China | 5 | 4 | 1 | 491 | 252 | +239 | 9 |
| South Korea | 5 | 3 | 2 | 396 | 345 | +51 | 8 |
| Chinese Taipei | 5 | 2 | 3 | 391 | 394 | −3 | 7 |
| Malaysia | 5 | 1 | 4 | 237 | 431 | −194 | 6 |
| India | 5 | 0 | 5 | 242 | 510 | −268 | 5 |

November 2
16:00

| Malaysia | 72–64 | India |
Scoring by quarter: 14–12, 20–10, 17–22, 21–20

Angkasapura Lanud Hall, Medan

November 2
18:00

| Chinese Taipei | 67–96 | Japan |
Scoring by quarter: 20–26, 15–21, 18–30, 14–19

Angkasapura Lanud Hall, Medan

November 2
20:00

| China | 100–45 | South Korea |
Scoring by quarter: 20–8, 26–18, 22–8, 32–11

Angkasapura Lanud Hall, Medan

November 3
15:00

| India | 29–127 | China |
Scoring by quarter: 8–36, 5–31, 2–30, 14–30

Angkasapura Lanud Hall, Medan

November 3
17:00

| South Korea | 90–76 | Chinese Taipei |
Scoring by quarter: 28–17, 26–16, 21–16, 15–27

Angkasapura Lanud Hall, Medan

November 3
19:00

| Japan | 90–50 | Malaysia |
Scoring by quarter: 26–11, 25–19, 18–10, 21–10

Angkasapura Lanud Hall, Medan

November 4
15:00

| Chinese Taipei | 92–63 | India |
Scoring by quarter: 28–16, 20–17, 19–15, 25–15

Angkasapura Lanud Hall, Medan

November 4
17:00

| Japan | 78–65 | South Korea |
Scoring by quarter: 24–13, 21–14, 23–15, 10–23

Angkasapura Lanud Hall, Medan

November 4
19:00

| China | 98–26 | Malaysia |
Scoring by quarter: 30–6, 27–7, 23–6, 18–7

Angkasapura Lanud Hall, Medan

November 5
15:00

| India | 34–111 | Japan |
Scoring by quarter: 13–25, 7–35, 6–29, 8–22

Angkasapura Lanud Hall, Medan

November 5
17:00

| Malaysia | 39–88 | South Korea |
Scoring by quarter: 13–11, 9–19, 14–38, 3–20

Angkasapura Lanud Hall, Medan

November 5
19:00

| China | 95–65 | Chinese Taipei |
Scoring by quarter: 39–21, 20–12, 20–20, 16–12

Angkasapura Lanud Hall, Medan

November 6
15:00

| South Korea | 108–52 | India |
Scoring by quarter: 24–16, 24–13, 31–9, 29–14

Angkasapura Lanud Hall, Medan

November 6
17:00

| Japan | 87–71 | China |
Scoring by quarter: 28–16, 18–16, 18–22, 23–17

Angkasapura Lanud Hall, Medan

November 6
19:00

| Chinese Taipei | 91–50 | Malaysia |
Scoring by quarter: 25–15, 14–16, 28–13, 24–6

Angkasapura Lanud Hall, Medan

=== Level II ===
| Team | Pld | W | L | PF | PA | PD | Pts |
|---|---|---|---|---|---|---|---|
| Kazakhstan | 5 | 5 | 0 | 415 | 309 | +106 | 10 |
| Philippines | 5 | 4 | 1 | 377 | 309 | +68 | 9 |
| Thailand | 5 | 3 | 2 | 368 | 324 | +44 | 8 |
| Indonesia | 5 | 2 | 3 | 316 | 341 | −25 | 7 |
| Hong Kong | 5 | 1 | 4 | 303 | 387 | −84 | 6 |
| Singapore | 5 | 0 | 5 | 263 | 372 | −109 | 5 |

November 2
11:00

| Philippines | 74–67 | Thailand |
Scoring by quarter: 17–19, 13–16, 22–16, 22–16

Angkasapura Lanud Hall, Medan

November 2
13:00

| Indonesia | 62–45 | Singapore |
Scoring by quarter: 20–15, 13–9, 20–10, 9–11

Angkasapura Lanud Hall, Medan

November 3
11:00

| Thailand | 76–54 | Hong Kong |
Scoring by quarter: 11–8, 26–10, 17–19, 22–17

Angkasapura Lanud Hall, Medan

November 3
13:00

| Singapore | 44–89 | Kazakhstan |
Scoring by quarter: 11–23, 7–23, 18–20, 8–23

Angkasapura Lanud Hall, Medan

November 4
11:00

| Kazakhstan | 81–61 | Indonesia |
Scoring by quarter: 15–18, 25–16, 18–11, 23–17

Angkasapura Lanud Hall, Medan

November 4
13:00

| Hong Kong | 53–84 | Philippines |
Scoring by quarter: 13–24, 7–21, 23–20, 10–19

Angkasapura Lanud Hall, Medan

November 5
11:00

| Philippines | 68–50 | Singapore |
Scoring by quarter: 21–12, 9–8, 18–15, 20–15

Angkasapura Lanud Hall, Medan

November 5
13:00

| Indonesia | 61–73 | Thailand |
Scoring by quarter: 15–15, 15–19, 21–18, 10–21

Angkasapura Lanud Hall, Medan

November 6
11:00

| Singapore | 70–75 | Hong Kong |
Scoring by quarter: 12–20, 12–15, 26–25, 20–15

Angkasapura Lanud Hall, Medan

November 6
13:00

| Thailand | 74–81 | Kazakhstan |
Scoring by quarter: 15–18, 17–23, 26–18, 16–22

Angkasapura Lanud Hall, Medan

November 7
11:00

| Kazakhstan | 71–68 | Philippines |
Scoring by quarter: 21–20, 14–14, 21–20, 15–14

Angkasapura Lanud Hall, Medan

November 7
13:00

| Hong Kong | 59–64 | Indonesia |
Scoring by quarter: 16–21, 14–13, 12–11, 17–19

Angkasapura Lanud Hall, Medan

November 7
15:00

| Thailand | 78–54 | Singapore |
Scoring by quarter: 27–3, 14–22, 23–10, 14–19

Angkasapura Lanud Hall, Medan

November 8
11:00

| Indonesia | 68–83 | Philippines |
Scoring by quarter: 15–25, 18–11, 26–33, 9–14

Angkasapura Lanud Hall, Medan

November 8
13:00

| Hong Kong | 62–93 | Kazakhstan |
Scoring by quarter: 16–27, 15–22, 10–18, 21–26

Angkasapura Lanud Hall, Medan

== Qualifying round ==
Winners are promoted to Level I for the 2010 championships.

November 9
11:00

| Malaysia | 70–69 | Philippines |
Scoring by quarter: 20–14, 17–13, 19–36, 14–6

Angkasapura Lanud Hall, Medan

November 9
13:00

| India | 67–84 | Kazakhstan |
Scoring by quarter: 21–16, 17–29, 11–20, 18–19

Angkasapura Lanud Hall, Medan

== Final round ==
Semifinals
November 8
Japan | 90
Chinese Taipei | 53
November 8
China | 101
South Korea | 69

Final
November 9
Japan | 90
China | 87
3rd place
November 9
Chinese Taipei | 73
South Korea | 94

=== Semifinals ===
November 8
15:00

| Japan | 90–53 | Chinese Taipei |
Scoring by quarter: 22–12, 26–8, 19–17, 23–16
| Pts: Tokashiki 14 | | Pts: Peng S.C. 17 |

Angkasapura Lanud Hall, Medan

November 8
17:00

| China | 101–69 | South Korea |
Scoring by quarter: 25–12, 26–18, 29–21, 21–18
| Pts: Lu W. 30 | | Pts: Park H.J., Heo G.B., Choi W.S. 12 |

Angkasapura Lanud Hall, Medan

=== 3rd place ===
November 9
15:00

| Chinese Taipei | 73–94 | South Korea |
Scoring by quarter: 20–23, 26–19, 19–28, 8–24
| Pts: Cheng P.H. 20 | | Pts: Park H.J. 27 |

Angkasapura Lanud Hall, Medan

=== Final ===
November 9
17:00

| Japan | 90–87 | China |
Scoring by quarter: 21–24, 17–27, 31–10, 21–26
| Pts: Tokashiki 22; Rebs: Abe 10; Asts: Abe 8 | | Pts: Qiu S.Y., Zheng B.W. 20; Rebs: Qiu S.Y. 13; Asts: Qiu S.Y. 10 |

Angkasapura Lanud Hall, Medan
Referees: Mohammad Al-Amiri (KUW), Banpot Chetanasen (THA), Sutaryo Haryanto (INA)

== Final standing ==
| Qualified for the 2009 FIBA Under-19 World Championship for Women |

| Rank | Team | Record |
|---|---|---|
| 1st place, gold medalist(s) | Japan | 7–0 |
| 2nd place, silver medalist(s) | China | 5–2 |
| 3rd place, bronze medalist(s) | South Korea | 4–3 |
| 4 | Chinese Taipei | 2–5 |
| 5 | Malaysia | 2–4 |
| 6 | India | 0–6 |
| 7 | Kazakhstan | 6–0 |
| 8 | Philippines | 4–2 |
| 9 | Thailand | 3–2 |
| 10 | Indonesia | 2–3 |
| 11 | Hong Kong | 1–4 |
| 12 | Singapore | 0–5 |

== Awards ==
2008 Asian Under-18 champions

Japan
First title
