= 2016 FIBA Asia Under-18 Championship for Women =

23rd FIBA Under-18 Women's Asian Basketball Championship

Tournament details
- Host country: Thailand
- City: Bangkok
- Dates: 13–20 November
- Teams: 12 (from 1 confederation)
- Venue: 1 (in 1 host city)

Final positions
- Champions: China (15th title)
- Runners-up: Japan
- Third place: South Korea

Tournament statistics
- Top scorer: (Indonesia) Elizabeth (17.3)
- Top rebounds: (Kazakhstan) Olenberg (14.0)
- Top assists: (China) Wang J.Q. (5.7)
- PPG (Team): China (83.9)
- RPG (Team): China (51.4)
- APG (Team): China (16.6)

Official website
- 2016 FIBA Asia U-18 Championship for Women

The 2016 FIBA Asia Under-18 Championship for Women was the qualifying tournament for FIBA Asia at the 2017 FIBA Under-19 Women's Basketball World Cup. The tournament, which was also the 23rd edition of the biennial competition, took place in Bangkok, Thailand from November 13 to November 20, 2016.

China defeated Japan in the finals, 78–47, to notch their fourth straight title and 15th overall, while South Korea edged Chinese Taipei in the battle for Third Place, 66–63. China, Japan and South Korea will represent FIBA Asia at the 2017 FIBA Under-19 Women's Basketball World Cup, which will be held in Italy.

The championship was divided into two levels: Level I and Level II. The two lowest finishers of Level I (Thailand and India) met the top two finishers of Level II (Indonesia and Malaysia) to determine which teams qualified for the top Level of the 2018 Championships. Both Indonesia and Malaysia won promotion into Level I, with the losers, India and Thailand, being relegated to Level II.

== Qualifying ==
- Semifinalists of the 2014 FIBA Asia Under-18 Championship for Women:
  - China
  - Japan
  - South Korea
  - Chinese Taipei
- Qualifying round winners at the 2014 FIBA Asia Under-18 Championship for Women:
  - Thailand
  - India
- Levels:
  - Level I include teams that won in the qualifying round and the semifinalists of the 2014 championship, including the hosts.
  - Level II are the other teams, depending who will submit their applications in participating in the tournament.

== Participating teams ==
Included are teams' FIBA World Ranking prior to the tournament.

Level I	Level II
China (9); Japan (12); South Korea (18); Chinese Taipei (26); Thailand (40); India (38)	Malaysia (39); Kazakhstan (42); Hong Kong (43); Sri Lanka (50); Singapore (52); Indonesia (56)

== Preliminary round ==
All times are in Indochina Time (UTC+07:00)

=== Level I ===
Pos	Team	Pld	W	L	PF	PA	PD	Pts	Qualification
1	China	5	5	0	445	245	+200	10	Advance to final round
2	South Korea	5	4	1	319	262	+57	9	Advance to final round
3	Japan	5	3	2	412	274	+138	8	Advance to final round
4	Chinese Taipei	5	2	3	290	381	−91	7	Advance to final round
5	Thailand (H)	5	1	4	307	383	−76	6	Qualification to qualifying round
6	India	5	0	5	195	423	−228	5	Qualification to qualifying round

Source: FIBA.com
Rules for classification: (1) Tournament points, (2) Head-to-head tournament points, (3) Head-to-head goal average, (4) Overall goal average, (5) Drawing of lots
(H) Hosts

13 November 2016
15:00

Boxscore

India	58–67	Thailand
Scoring by quarter: 13–19, 7–26, 13–7, 25–15
Pts: Hemmige Mahesha 17; Rebs: Prabhakara 16; Asts: Prabhakara 4		Pts: Udomsuk 14; Rebs: Prajuapsook 15; Asts: Thongdaeng 4

Thai-Japanese Stadium, Bangkok
Referees: Lim Sok Hoon (MAS), Budi Marfan (INA), Yuen Chun Yip (HKG)

13 November 2016
17:00

Boxscore

Chinese Taipei	48–101	Japan
Scoring by quarter: 16–19, 11–30, 13–28, 8–24
Pts: Lo P.C. 18; Rebs: Liu H.Y. 6 Asts: Peng H.T. 3		Pts: Awatsu 15; Rebs: Umezawa 12; Asts: Sako 3

Thai-Japanese Stadium, Bangkok
Referees: Harja Jaladri (INA), Chan Wai Seong (MAS), Alexey Stepanenko (KAZ)

13 November 2016
19:00

Boxscore

South Korea	40–76	China
Scoring by quarter: 8–16, 13–15, 8–22, 11–23
Pts: Lee J.Y. 10; Rebs: Park J.H. 6 Asts: Park J.S., Kim N.Y. 1		Pts: Cao Y.J. 16; Rebs: Han 12; Asts: Wang J.Q., Jia S.Q. 2

Thai-Japanese Stadium, Bangkok
Referees: Ferdinand Pascual (PHI), Ho Shuet Mei (SIN), Alexandr Rulyov (KAZ)

14 November 2016
15:00

Boxscore

Japan	93–54	Thailand
Scoring by quarter: 26–18, 25–9, 24–11, 18–16
Pts: Umezawa 16; Rebs: Umezawa 6 Asts: Mawuli 4		Pts: Udomsuk 17; Rebs: Prajuapsook, Udomsuk 7 Asts: Thongdaeng 2

Thai-Japanese Stadium, Bangkok
Referees: Alexandr Rulyov (KAZ), Kong Sin Mui (HKG), Budi Marfan (INA)

14 November 2016
17:00

Boxscore

China	114–38	India
Scoring by quarter: 29–14, 26–9, 30–13, 29–2
Pts: Tan S.Y 18; Rebs: Zhang R. 9 Asts: Wang J.Q. 7		Pts: Hemmige Mahesha 12; Rebs: George, Suren 3 Asts: Masilamani, Chakravortty 1

Thai-Japanese Stadium, Bangkok
Referees: Alexey Stepanenko (KAZ), Chan Wai Seong (MAS), Herman (INA)

14 November 2016
19:00

Boxscore

South Korea	70–38	Chinese Taipei
Scoring by quarter: 20–9, 13–13, 22–13, 15–3
Pts: Park J.S. 17; Rebs: Park J.S. 18; Asts: Cha J.H., Park J.S. 3		Pts: Wu C.H. 10; Rebs: Lo P.C., Wang J.T. 8 Asts: Peng H.T. 6

Thai-Japanese Stadium, Bangkok
Referees: Harja Jaladri (INA), Gayan Buddhika Kahingala Waduge (SRI), Lim Sok Hoon (MAS)

15 November 2016
15:00

Boxscore

Thailand	58–86	China
Scoring by quarter: 14–28, 11–20, 20–19, 13–19
Pts: Udomsuk 15; Rebs: Summat 6 Asts: Thongdaeng 2		Pts: Wang J.Q. 18; Rebs: Li Y.R. 14; Asts: Wang J.Q. 6

Thai-Japanese Stadium, Bangkok
Referees: Harja Jaladri (INA), Gayan Buddhika Kahingala Waduge (SRI), Kong Sin Mui (HKG)

15 November 2016
17:00

Boxscore

Chinese Taipei	80–46	India
Scoring by quarter: 24–9, 17–4, 12–22, 27–11
Pts: Chen M.H. 17; Rebs: Chen Y.T. 8 Asts: Peng H.T. 8		Pts: Hemmige Mahesha 10; Rebs: Prabhakara 13; Asts: Hemmige Mahesha, Illath Parappalli 2

Thai-Japanese Stadium, Bangkok
Referees: Lim Sok Hoon (MAS), Ho Shuet Mei (SIN), Alexandr Rulyov (KAZ)

15 November 2016
19:00

Boxscore

Japan	64–70	South Korea
Scoring by quarter: 16–21, 15–20, 19–12, 14–17
Pts: Yamamoto 15; Rebs: Mawuli 9 Asts: Mawuli, Yamamoto 3		Pts: Park J.H. 19; Rebs: Park J.H. 11; Asts: Park J.S. 2

Thai-Japanese Stadium, Bangkok
Referees: Alexey Stepanenko (KAZ), Herman (INA), Yuen Chun Yip (HKG)

16 November 2016
15:00

Boxscore

Thailand	71–76	Chinese Taipei
Scoring by quarter: 18–12, 14–22, 18–16, 21–26
Pts: Thongdaeng 22; Rebs: Prajuapsook 15; Asts: Summat 5		Pts: Peng H.T. 18; Rebs: Wang J.T. 10; Asts: Peng H.T. 5

Thai-Japanese Stadium, Bangkok
Referees: Harja Jaladri (INA), Ho Shuet Mei (SIN), Lim Sok Hoon (MAS)

16 November 2016
17:00

Boxscore

South Korea	69–27	India
Scoring by quarter: 13–12, 20–4, 17–2, 19–9
Pts: Lee J.Y. 12; Rebs: Park J.H., Park J.S. 8 Asts: Park G.R. 4		Pts: Hemmige Mahesha 6 Rebs: Suren 11; Asts: George 2

Thai-Japanese Stadium, Bangkok
Referees: Yuen Chun Yip (HKG), Budi Marfan (INA), Alexandr Rulyov (KAZ)

16 November 2016
19:00

Boxscore

Japan	61–76	China
Scoring by quarter: 10–23, 21–24, 13–16, 17–13
Pts: Mawuli 16; Rebs: Umezawa 7 Asts: Akagi 4		Pts: Wang J.Q. 27; Rebs: Wang J.Q. 12; Asts: Wang J.Q. 9

Thai-Japanese Stadium, Bangkok
Referees: Ferdinand Pascual (PHI), Chan Wai Seong (MAS), Alexey Stepanenko (KAZ)

17 November 2016
15:00

Boxscore

South Korea	70–57	Thailand
Scoring by quarter: 18–11, 23–17, 20–11, 9–18
Pts: Na Y.J. 18; Rebs: Park J.S. 11; Asts: Cha J.H., Lee J.Y. 4		Pts: Sriharaksa 16; Rebs: Sriharaksa 7 Asts: Malarat 3

Thai-Japanese Stadium, Bangkok
Referees: Ferdinand Pascual (PHI), Herman (INA), Yuen Chun Yip (HKG)

17 November 2016
17:00

Boxscore

India	26–93	Japan
Scoring by quarter: 7–23, 8–21, 7–18, 4–31
Pts: Hemmige Mahesha 8 Rebs: George, Illath Parappalli 7 Asts: Masilamani 3		Pts: Miyashita 25; Rebs: Kuribayashi 14; Asts: Akagi 4

Thai-Japanese Stadium, Bangkok
Referees: Lim Sok Hoon (MAS), Kong Sin Mui (HKG), Alexey Stepanenko (KAZ)

17 November 2016
19:00

Boxscore

China	93–48	Chinese Taipei
Scoring by quarter: 27–13, 21–12, 26–12, 19–11
Pts: Li Y.R. 20; Rebs: Li Y.R. 16; Asts: Wang J.Q. 6		Pts: Peng H.T. 18; Rebs: Chen M.H. 5 Asts: Peng H.T., Chen M.H. 2

Thai-Japanese Stadium, Bangkok
Referees: Harja Jaladri (INA), Gayan Buddhika Kahingala Waduge (SRI), Alexandr Rulyov (KAZ)

=== Level II ===
Pos	Team	Pld	W	L	PF	PA	PD	Pts	Qualification
1	Indonesia	5	5	0	347	219	+128	10	Qualification to qualifying round
2	Malaysia	5	4	1	328	252	+76	9	Qualification to qualifying round
3	Hong Kong	5	3	2	307	267	+40	8	Eliminated
4	Kazakhstan	5	2	3	330	312	+18	7	Eliminated
5	Singapore	5	1	4	201	317	−116	6	Eliminated
6	Sri Lanka	5	0	5	227	373	−146	5	Eliminated

Source: FIBA.com
Rules for classification: (1) Tournament points, (2) Head-to-head tournament points, (3) Head-to-head goal average, (4) Overall goal average, (5) Drawing of lots

13 November 2016
09:00

Boxscore

Indonesia	75–34	Singapore
Scoring by quarter: 27–4, 12–13, 12–6, 24–11
Pts: Elizabeth 22; Rebs: Kusuma 13; Asts: 3 players 2		Pts: Chan, Alfian 7 Rebs: Choo J.Y., T. Ng 5 Asts: Chan, T. Ng 2

Thai-Japanese Stadium, Bangkok
Referees: Snehal Bendke (IND), Lee Ji-Youn (KOR), Yu Wei (CHN)

13 November 2016
11:00

Boxscore

Hong Kong	87–41	Sri Lanka
Scoring by quarter: 24–1, 16–9, 21–16, 26–15
Pts: Lau S.H. 18; Rebs: Lai N.M., Shek M.N. 7 Asts: Lui S.Y. 5		Pts: Samarsinghe Arachchige 11; Rebs: Gallassage 13; Asts: Morseth, Samarsinghe Arachchige 1

Thai-Japanese Stadium, Bangkok
Referees: Kim Bo-Hui (KOR), Jun Horiuchi (JPN), Watcharin Padungratchadakit (THA)

13 November 2016
13:00

Boxscore

Kazakhstan	59–74	Malaysia
Scoring by quarter: 15–18, 14–19, 8–25, 22–12
Pts: Olenberg 19; Rebs: Olenberg 17; Asts: 3 players 2		Pts: Ho C.Y. 19; Rebs: Chia M.Y. 10; Asts: Khoo K.S., Ho C.Y. 3

Thai-Japanese Stadium, Bangkok
Referees: Shoko Suguro (JPN), Chiang Meng-chen (TPE), Amarjot Singh Mavi (IND)

14 November 2016
09:00

Boxscore

Hong Kong	72–65	Kazakhstan
Scoring by quarter: 20–24, 17–16, 25–13, 10–12
Pts: Lui S.Y. 14; Rebs: Lai N.M. 9 Asts: Sham T.C., Lui S.Y. 3		Pts: Zukova 15; Rebs: Olenberg 15; Asts: Baibolekova 5

Thai-Japanese Stadium, Bangkok
Referees: Snehal Bendke (IND), Lee Ji-Youn (KOR), Preeda Muongmee (THA)

14 November 2016
11:00

Boxscore

Sri Lanka	47–73	Indonesia
Scoring by quarter: 9–25, 14–16, 12–20, 12–12
Pts: Preena 14; Rebs: Samarsinghe Arachchige 15; Asts: Goonewardena 4		Pts: Elizabeth 18; Rebs: Kusuma 9 Asts: Wongsohardjo 3

Thai-Japanese Stadium, Bangkok
Referees: Shoko Suguro (JPN), Amarjot Singh Mavi (IND), Song Houlu (CHN)

14 November 2016
13:00

Boxscore

Malaysia	64–33	Singapore
Scoring by quarter: 15–7, 20–9, 12–4, 17–13
Pts: Foo S.Y. 12; Rebs: K.L. Hiew 11; Asts: Khoo K.S. 5		Pts: Chan 14; Rebs: Choo J.Y. 6 Asts: Amurthalingam, Alfian 2

Thai-Japanese Stadium, Bangkok
Referees: Kim Bo-Hui (KOR), Chiang Meng-Chen (TPE), Jun Horiuchi (JPN)

15 November 2016
09:00

Boxscore

Kazakhstan	46–65	Indonesia
Scoring by quarter: 8–14, 8–19, 16–15, 14–17
Pts: Zukova 10; Rebs: Olenberg 10; Asts: Zukova 2		Pts: Kahol 19; Rebs: Kusuma 14; Asts: Tjundawan 5

Thai-Japanese Stadium, Bangkok
Referees: Kim Bo-Hui (KOR), Amarjot Singh Mavi (IND), Song Houlu (CHN)

15 November 2016
11:00

Boxscore

Malaysia	65–40	Hong Kong
Scoring by quarter: 15–7, 20–12, 20–5, 10–16
Pts: Ho C.Y. 13; Rebs: K.L. Hiew 10; Asts: Ho C.Y., Foo S.Y. 2		Pts: Lau S.H. 11; Rebs: Lui S.Y. 8 Asts: 4 players 1

Thai-Japanese Stadium, Bangkok
Referees: Snehal Bendke (IND), Ji Youn Lee (KOR), Shoko Suguro (JPN)

15 November 2016
13:00

Boxscore

Singapore	50–40	Sri Lanka
Scoring by quarter: 12–7, 10–10, 15–9, 13–14
Pts: T. Ng 15; Rebs: Choo J.Y. 17; Asts: Amurthalingam 4		Pts: Samarsinghe Arachchige 19; Rebs: Samarsinghe Arachchige 17; Asts: Goonewardena, Samarsinghe Arachchige 2

Thai-Japanese Stadium, Bangkok
Referees: Watcharin Padungratchadakit (THA), Jun Horiuchi (JPN), Yu Wei (CHN)

16 November 2016
09:00

Boxscore

Sri Lanka	46–71	Malaysia
Scoring by quarter: 8–20, 16–15, 11–22, 11–14
Pts: Samarsinghe Arachchige 15; Rebs: Samarsinghe Arachchige 15; Asts: Goonewardena, Samarsinghe Arachchige 3		Pts: Tan P.J. 26; Rebs: K.L. Hiew 11; Asts: Khoo K.S., Ho C.Y. 3

Thai-Japanese Stadium, Bangkok
Referees: Watcharin Padungratchadakit (THA), Song Houlu (CHN), Shoko Suguro (JPN)

16 November 2016
11:00

Boxscore

Kazakhstan	68–48	Singapore
Scoring by quarter: 24–11, 23–11, 8–11, 13–15
Pts: Olenberg 19; Rebs: Olenberg 15; Asts: Zukova 7		Pts: Chan, Alfian 10; Rebs: Choo J.Y. 10; Asts: 4 players 2

Thai-Japanese Stadium, Bangkok
Referees: Kim Bo-Hui (KOR), Chiang Meng-chen (TPE), Jun Horiuchi (JPN)

16 November 2016
13:00

Boxscore

Hong Kong	38–60	Indonesia
Scoring by quarter: 16–15, 7–9, 9–19, 6–17
Pts: Wong 9 Rebs: Lai N.M. 11; Asts: Lai N.M. 3		Pts: Tjundawan 19; Rebs: Kahol 20; Asts: 3 players 2

Thai-Japanese Stadium, Bangkok
Referees: Snehal Bendke (IND), Lee Ji-Youn (KOR), Preeda Muongmee (THA)

17 November 2016
09:00

Boxscore

Kazakhstan	92–53	Sri Lanka
Scoring by quarter: 19–15, 22–9, 26–18, 25–11
Pts: Olenberg 18; Rebs: Olenberg 13; Asts: Baibolekova 6		Pts: Samarsinghe Arachchige 16; Rebs: Wijesundera, Gallassage 9 Asts: Preena 3

Thai-Japanese Stadium, Bangkok
Referees: Shoko Suguro (JPN), Lee Ji-Youn (KOR), Yu Wei (CHN)

17 November 2016
11:00

Boxscore

Singapore	36–70	Hong Kong
Scoring by quarter: 6–19, 12–20, 5–17, 13–14
Pts: Tan L.W. 8 Rebs: Choo J.Y. 14; Asts: Choo J.Y. 1		Pts: Lai N.M. 16; Rebs: Lai N.M. 11; Asts: Sham T.C. 5

Thai-Japanese Stadium, Bangkok
Referees: Kim Bo-Hui (KOR), Amarjot Singh Mavi (IND), Preeda Muongmee (THA)

17 November 2016
13:00

Boxscore

Indonesia	74–54	Malaysia
Scoring by quarter: 22–8, 15–19, 22–14, 15–13
Pts: Elizabeth 24; Rebs: Wongsohardjo, Kusuma 10; Asts: Wongsohardjo 4		Pts: K.L. Hiew 16; Rebs: K.L. Hiew 16; Asts: Chia M.Y. 4

Thai-Japanese Stadium, Bangkok
Referees: Snehal Bendke (IND), Watcharin Padungratchadakit (THA), Song Houlu (CHN)

== Qualifying round ==
Winners are promoted to Level I of the 2018 FIBA U18 Women's Asian Championship.

19 November 2016
10:00

Boxscore

India	38–49	Indonesia
Scoring by quarter: 12–11, 14–10, 9–7, 3–21
Pts: Hemmige Mahesha 23; Rebs: George 8 Asts: George, Masilamani 2		Pts: Elizabeth 15; Rebs: Kusuma 16; Asts: Tjundawan, Wongsohardjo 4

Thai-Japanese Stadium, Bangkok
Referees: Shoko Suguro (JPN), Ji Youn Lee (KOR), Chun Yip Yuen (HKG)

19 November 2016
12:00

Boxscore

Thailand	44–50	Malaysia
Scoring by quarter: 14–16, 12–9, 10–4, 8–21
Pts: Prajuapsook 14; Rebs: Udomsuk 16; Asts: Aiemsumang, Prajuapsook 2		Pts: Tan P.J. 20; Rebs: K.L. Hiew 16; Asts: Ho C.Y., Khoo K.S. 2

Thai-Japanese Stadium, Bangkok
Referees: Bohui Kim (KOR), Jun Horiuchi (JPN), Houlu Song (CHN)

== Final round ==
Top three teams qualify for the 2017 FIBA Under-19 Women's Basketball World Cup.

Semifinals
19 November
South Korea	41
Japan	63
19 November
China	64
Chinese Taipei	35

Final
20 November
Japan	47
China	78
Third place
20 November
South Korea	66
Chinese Taipei	63

=== Semifinals ===
19 November 2016
14:00

Boxscore

South Korea	41–63	Japan
Scoring by quarter: 13–15, 11–16, 11–14, 6–18
Pts: Park J.S. 18; Rebs: Park J.S. 14; Asts: Park J.S. 5		Pts: Mawuli 14; Rebs: Mawuli 14; Asts: Akagi 4

Thai-Japanese Stadium, Bangkok
Referees: Ferdinand Pascual (PHI), Sok Hoon Lim (MAS), Alexey Stepanenko (KAZ)

19 November 2016
16:00

Boxscore

China	64–35	Chinese Taipei
Scoring by quarter: 21–10, 13–9, 22–7, 8–9
Pts: Li Yr. 20; Rebs: Li Yr. 17; Asts: Li Yn. 3		Pts: Wu C. 7 Rebs: Chen Y. 6 Asts: Peng H. 2

Thai-Japanese Stadium, Bangkok
Referees: Harja Jaladri (INA), Preeda Muongmee (THA), Alexandr Rulyov (KAZ)

=== Third place game ===
20 November 2016
14:00

Boxscore

South Korea	66–63	Chinese Taipei
Scoring by quarter: 15–21, 20–16, 17–15, 14–11
Pts: Lee J.Y. 31; Rebs: Park J.H. 12; Asts: Lee J.Y. 2		Pts: Wang J.T. 24; Rebs: Chen M.H. 8 Asts: Peng H.T. 5

Thai-Japanese Stadium, Bangkok
Referees: Ferdinand Pascual (PHI), Snehal Bendke (IND), Alexey Stepanenko (KAZ)

=== Final ===
20 November 2016
16:00

Boxscore

Japan	47–78	China
Scoring by quarter: 12–17, 12–16, 11–23, 12–22
Pts: Yamamoto 13; Rebs: Akaho 7 Asts: Akagi, Yamamoto 2		Pts: Wang J.Q. 29; Rebs: Li Y.R. 23; Asts: Wang J.Q. 8

Thai-Japanese Stadium, Bangkok
Referees: Harja Jaladri (INA), Bohui Kim (KOR), Sok Hoon Lim (MAS)

== Final standing ==
Qualified for the 2017 FIBA Under-19 Women's Basketball World Cup

Rank	Team	Record
1st place, gold medalist(s)	China	7–0
2nd place, silver medalist(s)	Japan	4–3
3rd place, bronze medalist(s)	South Korea	5–2
4	Chinese Taipei	2–5
5	Thailand	1–5
6	India	0–6
7	Indonesia	6–0
8	Malaysia	5–1
9	Hong Kong	3–2
10	Kazakhstan	2–3
11	Singapore	1–4
12	Sri Lanka	0–5

== Awards ==
2016 FIBA Asia Under-18 champions

China
15th title
