= Thailand women's national under-19 basketball team =

Thailand
- FIBA zone: FIBA Asia
- National federation: Basketball Sport Association of Thailand

U19 World Cup
- Appearances: 2
- Medals: None

U18 Asia Cup
- Appearances: 16
- Medals: (bronze) Bronze: 1 (1980)

U18 Asia Cup Division B
- Appearances: 1
- Medals: None

The Thailand women's national under-18 and under-19 basketball team is a national basketball team of Thailand, administered by the Basketball Sport Association of Thailand. It represents the country in international under-18 and under-19 women's basketball competitions.

== FIBA Under-18 Women's Asia Cup participations ==
Year	Division A
1977	5th
1980	3rd place, bronze medalist(s)
1982	7th
1989	6th
1990	5th
1992	5th
1996	5th
1998	Withdrew
2000	6th
2002	6th

Year	Division A	Division B
2004	5th	
2007	6th	
2008	9th	
2010	7th	
2012	5th	
2014	5th	
2016	5th	
2022		5th

== FIBA Under-19 Women's Basketball World Cup participations ==
Year	Result
2009	16th
2019	16th

== See also ==
- Thailand women's national basketball team
- Thailand women's national under-16 basketball team
- Thailand men's national under-18 basketball team
