= Priyanka Prabhakara =

Indian basketball player

Priyanka Prabhakara (3 October 1998) is an Indian basketball player from Karnataka. She plays for the India women's national basketball team as a shooting guard. She plays for Karnataka team in the domestic tournaments. She is also a 3x3 player.

== Early life ==
Priyanka is from Mysuru, Karnataka, India. She is the daughter of T. Prabhakara and Geethanjali, a former Kerala athlete and kabaddi player. She was initiated into basketball due to her height following a suggestion from her school coach Satyanarayana, and later joined the Vidyanagar Sports Hostel in Hosahalli, Mandya district. She did her graduation at Reva University.

== Career ==
Priyanka made her Junior India debut as an Indian Youth player in the 2016 FIBA Asia U18 Championship for Women.

In January 2017, Priyanka represented Karnataka women in the Senior Women's National Basketball Championships in Puducherry. An NBA spotter, was present along with the Indian selectors at the Puducherry Nationals. She was selected to be part of the third annual Basketball Without Borders (BWB) Global Camp comprising 67 players from across the world. It was held from February 17 to 19 at the New Orleans Pelicans’ practice facility as part of the NBA All Star Game 2017.

In July 2018, she represented the Indian under 18 team in the William Jones Cup. In August 2018, she was selected for the Indian team to take part in the Asian Games, Jakarta, Indonesia.
