= Singapore women's national under-18 basketball team =

Singapore
- FIBA zone: FIBA Asia
- National federation: Basketball Association of Singapore

U19 World Cup
- Appearances: None

U18 Asia Cup
- Appearances: 7
- Medals: None

U18 Asia Cup Division B
- Appearances: 1
- Medals: None

The Singapore women's national under-18 basketball team is a national basketball team of Singapore, administered by the Basketball Association of Singapore. It represents the country in international under-18 women's basketball competitions.

== FIBA Under-18 Women's Asia Cup participations ==
Year	Division A	Division B
1984	5th	
1989	8th	
2004	6th	
2007	5th	
2008	12th	
2012	10th	
2016	11th	
2018		6th

== See also ==
- Singapore women's national basketball team
- Singapore women's national under-16 basketball team
- Singapore men's national under-18 basketball team
