= 2021 FIBA Under-19 Women's Basketball World Cup =

Basketball tournament in Hungary

Tournament details
- Host country: Hungary
- City: Debrecen
- Dates: 7–15 August
- Teams: 16 (from 5 confederations)
- Venues: 2 (in 1 host city)

Final positions
- Champions: United States (9th title)
- Runners-up: Australia
- Third place: Hungary
- Fourth place: Mali

Tournament statistics
- Games played: 56
- Attendance: 1,362 (24 per game)
- MVP: (United States) Caitlin Clark
- Top scorer: (Mali) Sika Koné (19.7 points per game)

Official website
- www.fiba.basketball

The 2021 FIBA Under-19 Women's Basketball World Cup (Hungarian: 2021-es FIBA 19 év alatti kosárlabda-világbajnokság) was a tournament organised by FIBA for women's youth national teams aged 19 years old and below. The tournament was hosted in Debrecen, Hungary from 7 to 15 August 2021.

The United States won their ninth title, after defeating Australia in the final. Hungary won their bronze medals after a win over Mali.

== Qualified teams ==
Means of qualification	Dates	Venue	Berths	Qualifiers
Host nation	31 January 2020	Mies	1	Hungary
European selection (5 of top 6 FIBA Europe teams in World Ranking)	7 April 2020	Munich	5	Czech Republic; France; Italy; Russia; Spain
2020 FIBA U18 Women's African Championship	8 December 2020	Cairo	2	Egypt; Mali
Americas selection (Top 4 FIBA Americas teams in World Ranking)	1 March 2021	Miami	4	Argentina; Brazil; Canada; United States
Asia selection (Top 4 FIBA Asia teams in World Ranking)	10 March 2021	Mies	4	Australia; Chinese Taipei; Japan; South Korea
Total			16	

== Draw ==
The draw took place on 28 April 2021 in Berlin, Germany.

=== Seeding ===
On 27 April 2021, the pots were announced.

Pot 1	Pot 2	Pot 3	Pot 4
United States; Canada; Spain; Hungary	France; Italy; Russia; Czech Republic	Australia; Japan; South Korea; Chinese Taipei	Brazil; Argentina; Egypt; Mali

== Preliminary round ==
All times are local (UTC+2).

=== Group A ===
Pos	Team	Pld	W	L	PF	PA	PD	Pts
1	United States	3	3	0	292	132	+160	6
2	Australia	3	2	1	216	169	+47	5
3	Italy	3	1	2	160	227	−67	4
4	Egypt	3	0	3	137	277	−140	3

Source: FIBA
Rules for classification: 1) Points; 2) Head-to-head results; 3) Points difference; 4) Points scored.

7 August 2021
17:00

Boxscore

Australia	99–28	Egypt
Scoring by quarter: 34–8, 18–2, 18–10, 29–8
Pts: Melbourne 19; Rebs: Rees 13; Asts: Melbourne, Prior 5		Pts: Hussein 10; Rebs: Hussein 13; Asts: four players 1

Oláh Gábor Sport Hall, Debrecen
Attendance: 20
Referees: Andrei Sharapa (BLR), Leong Chuen Wing (SIN), Veronika Vávrová (CZE)

7 August 2021
20:30

Boxscore

Italy	37–96	United States
Scoring by quarter: 11–27, 3–21, 12–24, 11–24
Pts: Spinelli 13; Rebs: Mbengue 7 Asts: three players 2		Pts: Citron 15; Rebs: Ware 9 Asts: Paopao 7

Hódos Imre Sportcsarnok, Debrecen
Attendance: 20
Referees: Martin Horozov (BUL), Esperanza Mendoza (ESP), Kristian Paez (ECU)

8 August 2021
17:00

Boxscore

Egypt	73–81 (OT)	Italy
Scoring by quarter: 24–18, 15–13, 13–17, 17–21, Overtime: 4–12
Pts: Ismail 22; Rebs: three players 7 Asts: Abdelhamid 4		Pts: Spinelli 21; Rebs: Spinelli 11; Asts: Bovenzi 6

Oláh Gábor Sport Hall, Debrecen
Attendance: 0
Referees: Martin Horozov (BUL), Yann Davidson (MAD), Alexandra Stan (ROU)

8 August 2021
20:00

Boxscore

United States	99–59	Australia
Scoring by quarter: 25–20, 27–15, 20–14, 27–10
Pts: Clark 24; Rebs: Betts 12; Asts: Clark 7		Pts: Melbourne 11; Rebs: Prior 6 Asts: three players 3

Oláh Gábor Sport Hall, Debrecen
Attendance: 0
Referees: Tomas Jasevičius (LTU), Esperanza Mendoza (ESP), Siniša Prpa (SRB)

10 August 2021
20:30

Boxscore

Egypt	36–97	United States
Scoring by quarter: 7–34, 12–21, 4–26, 13–16
Pts: Ismail 13; Rebs: Hussein 9 Asts: Abdelhamid 3		Pts: Fudd 18; Rebs: Betts 13; Asts: Clark 8

Hódos Imre Sportcsarnok, Debrecen
Attendance: 20
Referees: Paulo Marques (POR), Nicolás Flores (URU), Veronika Vávrová (CZE)

10 August 2021
20:30

Boxscore

Italy	42–58	Australia
Scoring by quarter: 9–15, 17–15, 9–16, 7–12
Pts: Panzera 10; Rebs: Panzera 9 Asts: four players 2		Pts: Loughridge 10; Rebs: Prior 14; Asts: Prior 6

Oláh Gábor Sport Hall, Debrecen
Attendance: 0
Referees: Gatis Saliņš (LAT), Mihkel Männiste (EST), Felipe Valenzuela (CHI)

=== Group B ===
Pos	Team	Pld	W	L	PF	PA	PD	Pts
1	Russia	3	3	0	215	143	+72	6
2	Hungary (H)	3	2	1	235	141	+94	5
3	Argentina	3	1	2	136	209	−73	4
4	Chinese Taipei	3	0	3	143	236	−93	3

Source: FIBA
Rules for classification: 1) Points; 2) Head-to-head results; 3) Points difference; 4) Points scored.
(H) Hosts

7 August 2021
17:30

Boxscore

Chinese Taipei	42–99	Hungary
Scoring by quarter: 8–20, 14–19, 8–27, 12–33
Pts: Kuo 13; Rebs: Chen C. 6 Asts: Yeh 3		Pts: Madár 17; Rebs: Krasovec, Sitku 8 Asts: Rozmán 5

Hódos Imre Sportcsarnok, Debrecen
Attendance: 200
Referees: Gatis Saliņš (LAT), Alexey Stepanenko (KAZ), Aya Ahmed (EGY)

7 August 2021
20:00

Boxscore

Russia	73–42	Argentina
Scoring by quarter: 17–10, 18–12, 22–9, 16–10
Pts: Savkovich 15; Rebs: Kosu 9 Asts: Elberg, Savkovich 4		Pts: Fernández, Maza 7 Rebs: Buzzetti 6 Asts: Baccareli 3

Oláh Gábor Sport Hall, Debrecen
Attendance: 0
Referees: Gina Cross (USA), Alexandre Deman (FRA), Jean Ruhamiriza (RWA)

8 August 2021
17:30

Boxscore

Hungary	56–70	Russia
Scoring by quarter: 16–17, 12–15, 16–16, 12–22
Pts: Dombai 16; Rebs: Sitku 5 Asts: Boros 5		Pts: Kosu 20; Rebs: Kosu 20; Asts: Kosu, Savkovich 3

Hódos Imre Sportcsarnok, Debrecen
Attendance: 0
Referees: Andrei Sharapa (BLR), Johnny Batista (PUR), Veronika Vávrová (CZE)

8 August 2021
20:30

Boxscore

Argentina	65–56	Chinese Taipei
Scoring by quarter: 17–14, 10–16, 23–12, 15–14
Pts: Buzzetti 16; Rebs: Buzzetti 16; Asts: Marin 5		Pts: Chen C. 19; Rebs: Chen C., Kuo 7 Asts: Li Y., Yeh 3

Hódos Imre Sportcsarnok, Debrecen
Attendance: 10
Referees: Christine Vuong (CAN), Alexandre Drman (FRA), Lee Ji-youn (KOR)

10 August 2021
17:30

Boxscore

Hungary	80–29	Argentina
Scoring by quarter: 12–10, 30–5, 19–4, 19–10
Pts: Dombai 16; Rebs: Madár 10; Asts: Boros, Dombai 4		Pts: Maza 7 Rebs: Buzzetti 7 Asts: Maza 2

Hódos Imre Sportcsarnok, Debrecen
Attendance: 0
Referees: Gina Cross (USA), Siniša Prpa (SRB), Carlos Vélez (COL)

10 August 2021
17:30

Boxscore

Russia	72–45	Chinese Taipei
Scoring by quarter: 15–15, 26–6, 16–12, 15–12
Pts: Odintcova 20; Rebs: Odintcova 11; Asts: Tumanova 5		Pts: Tang 11; Rebs: Kuo 5 Asts: six players 2

Oláh Gábor Sport Hall, Debrecen
Attendance: 20
Referees: Esperanza Mendoza (ESP), Christine Vuong (CAN), Alexandra Stan (ROU)

=== Group C ===
Pos	Team	Pld	W	L	PF	PA	PD	Pts
1	France	3	3	0	241	148	+93	6
2	Spain	3	2	1	231	124	+107	5
3	South Korea	3	1	2	152	253	−101	4
4	Brazil	3	0	3	148	247	−99	3

Source: FIBA
Rules for classification: 1) Points; 2) Head-to-head results; 3) Points difference; 4) Points scored.

7 August 2021
11:30

Boxscore

Spain	87–37	South Korea
Scoring by quarter: 19–2, 20–15, 20–13, 28–7
Pts: García 16; Rebs: Capel 7 Asts: Lamana 7		Pts: Park So. 11; Rebs: Cho 6 Asts: three players 2

Hódos Imre Sportcsarnok, Debrecen
Attendance: 50
Referees: Christine Vuong (CAN), Mihkel Männiste (EST), Jelena Smiljanić (SRB)

7 August 2021
14:30

Boxscore

France	84–52	Brazil
Scoring by quarter: 11–17, 30–9, 20–20, 23–6
Pts: Bussière 22; Rebs: Djoko 9 Asts: Lacan 10		Pts: Mair. Pereira 16; Rebs: Mair. Pereira 9 Asts: Dias do Santos, Mais. Pereira 5

Hódos Imre Sportcsarnok, Debrecen
Attendance: 50
Referees: Alexey Davydov (RUS), Johnny Batista (PUR), Siniša Prpa (SRB)

8 August 2021
11:00

Boxscore

South Korea	35–92	France
Scoring by quarter: 7–17, 11–35, 8–19, 9–21
Pts: Sim 7 Rebs: Cho 6 Asts: Sim 5		Pts: Bussière 20; Rebs: Bussière 8 Asts: Bussière, Lacan 4

Oláh Gábor Sport Hall, Debrecen
Attendance: 42
Referees: Paulo Marques (POR), Alexey Stepanenko (KAZ), Nicolás Flores (URU)

8 August 2021
14:00

Boxscore

Brazil	22–83	Spain
Scoring by quarter: 7–22, 9–24, 4–22, 2–15
Pts: Mair. Pereira 9 Rebs: De Oliveira 7 Asts: D'arrigo Soares, Dias do Santos 2		Pts: De Santiago Otero 15; Rebs: Sánchez 8 Asts: Lamana 7

Oláh Gábor Sport Hall, Debrecen
Attendance: 0
Referees: Gina Cross (USA), Mihkel Männiste (EST), Carlos Vélez (COL)

10 August 2021
11:30

Boxscore

Brazil	74–80	South Korea
Scoring by quarter: 13–13, 20–19, 13–23, 28–25
Pts: Maia. Pereira 30; Rebs: Maia. Pereira 20; Asts: Maia. Pereira 7		Pts: Park So., Sim 18; Rebs: Lee 10; Asts: Cho 10

Oláh Gábor Sport Hall, Debrecen
Attendance: 0
Referees: Alexey Davydov (RUS), Jean Ruhamiriza (RWA), Aya Ahmed (EGY)

10 August 2021
11:30

Boxscore

Spain	61–65	France
Scoring by quarter: 29–16, 15–18, 6–11, 11–20
Pts: Alarcón 15; Rebs: Contell, Suárez 6 Asts: Lamana 4		Pts: Astier 12; Rebs: Gueye 8 Asts: Astier, Lacan 4

Hódos Imre Sportcsarnok, Debrecen
Attendance: 50
Referees: Martin Horouov (BUL), Pavel Fuska (SVK), Leong Chuen Wing (SIN)

=== Group D ===
Pos	Team	Pld	W	L	PF	PA	PD	Pts
1	Czech Republic	3	2	1	154	137	+17	5
2	Mali	3	2	1	155	139	+16	4 (Note: Mali 2–0; Japan 1–1; Canada 0–2)
3	Japan	3	1	2	198	212	−14	4
4	Canada	3	1	2	223	242	−19	4

Source: FIBA
Rules for classification: 1) Points; 2) Head-to-head results; 3) Points difference; 4) Points scored.
Notes:

7 August 2021
11:00

Boxscore

Mali	0–20	Czech Republic

Oláh Gábor Sport Hall, Debrecen
Referees: Paulo Marques (POR), Felipe Valenzuela (CHI), Lee Ji-youn (KOR)

The match was a forfeit by Mali.

7 August 2021
14:00

Boxscore

Canada	82–83	Japan
Scoring by quarter: 22–28, 32–21, 8–23, 20–11
Pts: Day-Wilson 29; Rebs: Ejim 9 Asts: Day-Wilson 4		Pts: Emura 16; Rebs: Tanaka, Tateyama 11; Asts: Hirashita 6

Oláh Gábor Sport Hall, Debrecen
Attendance: 20
Referees: Tomas Jasevičius (LTU), Pavel Fuska (SVK), Yann Davidson (MAD)

8 August 2021
11:30

Boxscore

Japan	57–67	Mali
Scoring by quarter: 18–19, 16–10, 7–23, 16–15
Pts: Emura 19; Rebs: Sato 8 Asts: Hirashita 4		Pts: S. Koné 24; Rebs: S. Koné 19; Asts: F. Koné 7

Hódos Imre Sportcsarnok, Debrecen
Attendance: 20
Referees: Alexey Davydov (RUS), Goran Šljivić (AUT), Jelena Smiljanić (SRB)

8 August 2021
14:30

Boxscore

Czech Republic	71–79	Canada
Scoring by quarter: 24–19, 12–17, 13–24, 22–19
Pts: Paurová 16; Rebs: Paurová 11; Asts: Malíková 7		Pts: Day-Wilson 31; Rebs: Ejim 10; Asts: Day-Wilson 7

Hódos Imre Sportcsarnok, Debrecen
Attendance: 30
Referees: Gatis Saliņš (LAT), Felipe Valenzuela (CHI), Aya Ahmed (EGY)

10 August 2021
14:30

Boxscore

Mali	88–62	Canada
Scoring by quarter: 27–15, 21–15, 14–17, 26–15
Pts: Dabou 18; Rebs: S. Koné 11; Asts: Berthe, F. Koné 5		Pts: Ejim 15; Rebs: Wallack 10; Asts: Day-Wilson 9

Hódos Imre Sportcsarnok, Debrecen
Attendance: 20
Referees: Andrei Sharapa (BLR), Alexandre Deman (FRA), Kristian Paez (ECU)

10 August 2021
14:30

Boxscore

Japan	58–63	Czech Republic
Scoring by quarter: 24–13, 6–17, 20–19, 8–14
Pts: Hirashita 15; Rebs: Santa, Tanaka 5 Asts: Hirashita 4		Pts: Paurová 17; Rebs: Fišerová, Paurová 10; Asts: Malíková 4

Oláh Gábor Sport Hall, Debrecen
Attendance: 0
Referees: Tomas Jasevičius (LTU), Johnny Batista (PUR), Goran Šljivić (AUT)

== Knockout stage ==
=== Bracket ===
Round of 16
11 August
United States	129
Chinese Taipei	45
11 August
Spain	71
Japan	64
11 August
Italy	48
Hungary	54
11 August
Brazil	64
Czech Republic	74
11 August
Australia	66
Argentina	35
11 August
France	72
Canada	79
11 August
Egypt	55
Russia	85
11 August
South Korea	46
Mali	87

Quarter-finals
13 August
United States	98
Spain	64
13 August
Hungary	78
Czech Republic	71
13 August
Australia	72
Canada	61
13 August
Russia	47
Mali	69

Semi-finals
14 August
United States	75
Hungary	42
14 August
Australia	62
Mali	50

Final
15 August
United States	70
Australia	52
Third place
15 August
Hungary	88
Mali	67

5–8th place bracket

5–8th place semifinals
14 August
Spain	63
Czech Republic	66
14 August
Canada	66
Russia	58

Fifth place
15 August
Czech Republic	61
Canada	72
Seventh place
15 August
Spain	60
Russia	51

9–16th place bracket

9–16th place quarterfinals
13 August
Chinese Taipei	42
Japan	111
13 August
Italy	71
Brazil	43
13 August
Argentina	39
France	64
13 August
Egypt	63
South Korea	62

9–12th place semifinals
14 August
Japan	88
Italy	51
14 August
France	103
Egypt	35

Ninth place
15 August
Japan	68
France	62
Eleventh place
15 August
Italy	80
Egypt	66

13–16th place bracket

13–16th place semifinals
14 August
Chinese Taipei	86
Brazil	70
14 August
Argentina	48
South Korea	57

13th place
15 August
Chinese Taipei	50
South Korea	55
15th place
15 August
Brazil	63
Argentina	69

=== Round of 16 ===
11 August 2021
11:00

Boxscore

Spain	71–64	Japan
Scoring by quarter: 21–19, 14–19, 17–19, 19–7
Pts: Buenavida 16; Rebs: Suárez 11; Asts: Lamana 5		Pts: Emura 20; Rebs: Hirashita 10; Asts: Hirashita 3

Oláh Gábor Sport Hall, Debrecen
Attendance: 30
Referees: Paulo Marques (POR), Alexandre Deman (FRA), Lee Ji-youn (KOR)

11 August 2021
11:30

Boxscore

South Korea	46–87	Mali
Scoring by quarter: 15–15, 16–24, 5–26, 10–22
Pts: Shin 14; Rebs: Shin 8 Asts: Cho, Shin 3		Pts: S. Koné 19; Rebs: S. Koné 13; Asts: F. Koné 7

Hódos Imre Sportcsarnok, Debrecen
Attendance: 10
Referees: Tomas Jasevičius (LTU), Christine Vuong (CAN), Carlos Vélez (COL)

11 August 2021
14:00

Boxscore

France	72–79	Canada
Scoring by quarter: 12–20, 28–13, 13–26, 19–20
Pts: Bussière 16; Rebs: Diarisso 11; Asts: Bussière 7		Pts: Demeke 19; Rebs: Ejim 9 Asts: Day-Wilson 8

Oláh Gábor Sport Hall, Debrecen
Attendance: 20
Referees: Gatis Saliņš (LAT), Esperanza Mendoza (ESP), Kristian Paez (ECU)

11 August 2021
14:30

Boxscore

Brazil	64–74	Czech Republic
Scoring by quarter: 14–15, 19–19, 11–21, 20–19
Pts: Dias dos Santos 19; Rebs: Mais. Pereira 9 Asts: Dias dos Santos 5		Pts: Maliková, Zeithammerová 15; Rebs: Paurová 10; Asts: Zeithammerová 7

Hódos Imre Sportcsarnok, Debrecen
Attendance: 20
Referees: Gina Cross (USA), Alexey Stepanenko (KAZ), Alexandra Stan (ROU)

11 August 2021
17:00

Boxscore

United States	129–45	Chinese Taipei
Scoring by quarter: 35–11, 28–14, 40–5, 26–15
Pts: Verhulst 18; Rebs: three players 9 Asts: Clark 8		Pts: Tang 12; Rebs: Chen C. 5 Asts: three players 3

Oláh Gábor Sport Hall, Debrecen
Attendance: 20
Referees: Pavel Fuska (SVK), Jelena Smiljanić (SRB), Aya Ahmed (EGY)

11 August 2021
17:30

Boxscore

Italy	48–54	Hungary
Scoring by quarter: 16–22, 9–11, 14–9, 9–12
Pts: Natali, Panzera 14; Rebs: Nasraoui, Panzera 8 Asts: Panzera 6		Pts: Dombai, Madár 13; Rebs: Madár 8 Asts: Dombai 4

Hódos Imre Sportcsarnok, Debrecen
Attendance: 0
Referees: Andrei Sharapa (BLR), Johnny Batista (PUR), Leong Chuen Wing (SIN)

11 August 2021
20:00

Boxscore

Egypt	55–85	Russia
Scoring by quarter: 16–21, 6–15, 11–29, 22–20
Pts: Abdellatif 14; Rebs: Abdellatif, Hussein 6 Asts: Yassine 5		Pts: Tumanova 18; Rebs: Kosu 14; Asts: Loginova 8

Oláh Gábor Sport Hall, Debrecen
Attendance: 0
Referees: Mihkel Männiste (EST), Goran Šljivić (AUT), Yann Davidson (MAD)

11 August 2021
20:30

Boxscore

Australia	66–35	Argentina
Scoring by quarter: 23–5, 16–7, 11–15, 16–8
Pts: Puoch 15; Rebs: Prior 9 Asts: Loughridge, Melbourne 3		Pts: Vilches 10; Rebs: Buzzetti 10; Asts: Baccareli, Maza 3

Hódos Imre Sportcsarnok, Debrecen
Attendance: 10
Referees: Martin Horozov (BUL), Nicolás Flores (URU), Jean Ruhamiriza (RWA)

=== 9–16th place quarterfinals ===
13 August 2021
11:00

Boxscore

Chinese Taipei	42–111	Japan
Scoring by quarter: 10–42, 6–29, 17–14, 9–26
Pts: Kuo 17; Rebs: Kuo 6 Asts: Chen C. 3		Pts: Ogita 21; Rebs: Yamada 8 Asts: Yamada 14

Oláh Gábor Sport Hall, Debrecen
Attendance: 0
Referees: Christine Vuong (CAN), Aya Ahmed (EGY), Siniša Prpa (SRB)

13 August 2021
14:00

Boxscore

Italy	71–43	Brazil
Scoring by quarter: 15–14, 18–7, 16–5, 22–17
Pts: Allievi 12; Rebs: Mbengue 14; Asts: Nasraoui 6		Pts: Mais. Pereira 13; Rebs: Mais. Pereira 10; Asts: three players 2

Oláh Gábor Sport Hall, Debrecen
Attendance: 0
Referees: Martin Horozov (BUL), Goran Šljivić (AUT), Leong Chuen Wing (SIN)

13 August 2021
17:00

Boxscore

Argentina	39–64	France
Scoring by quarter: 2–22, 10–20, 18–16, 9–6
Pts: Toledano 8 Rebs: Fernández 6 Asts: Bazán 2		Pts: Sida Abega 12; Rebs: three players 8 Asts: Lacan 8

Oláh Gábor Sport Hall, Debrecen
Attendance: 0
Referees: Tomas Jasevičius (LTU), Pavel Fuska (SVK), Lee Ji-youn (KOR)

13 August 2021
20:00

Boxscore

Egypt	63–62	South Korea
Scoring by quarter: 24–15, 13–16, 7–10, 19–21
Pts: Hussein 20; Rebs: Hussein 10; Asts: Elfiky 4		Pts: Lee 28; Rebs: Lee, Ko 9 Asts: Cho 4

Oláh Gábor Sport Hall, Debrecen
Attendance: 0
Referees: Felipe Valenzuela (CHI), Veronika Vávrová (CZE), Jean Ruhamiriza (RWA)

=== Quarterfinals ===
13 August 2021
11:30

Boxscore

Australia	72–61	Canada
Scoring by quarter: 19–12, 11–18, 13–19, 29–12
Pts: Puoch 25; Rebs: Melbourne 9 Asts: Deeble 6		Pts: Day-Wilson 17; Rebs: Ejim 11; Asts: Day-Wilson 3

Hódos Imre Sportcsarnok, Debrecen
Attendance: 20
Referees: Andrei Sharapa (BLR), Mihkel Männiste (EST), Esperanza Mendoza (ESP)

13 August 2021
14:30

Boxscore

Russia	47–69	Mali
Scoring by quarter: 13–14, 17–20, 13–11, 4–24
Pts: Kosu 16; Rebs: Kosu 13; Asts: Loginova, Pashkovskaia 3		Pts: S. Koné 21; Rebs: S. Koné 11; Asts: F. Koné 7

Hódos Imre Sportcsarnok, Debrecen
Attendance: 20
Referees: Gina Cross (USA), Johnny Batista (PUR), Kristian Paez (ECU)

13 August 2021
17:30

Boxscore

Hungary	78–71	Czech Republic
Scoring by quarter: 26–22, 14–13, 17–17, 21–19
Pts: Boros 23; Rebs: Madár 11; Asts: Dombai 7		Pts: Paurová 22; Rebs: Fišerová 12; Asts: Zeithammerová 5

Hódos Imre Sportcsarnok, Debrecen
Attendance: 200
Referees: Gatis Saliņš (LAT), Alexandre Deman (FRA), Alexey Davydov (RUS)

13 August 2021
20:30

Boxscore

United States	98–64	Spain
Scoring by quarter: 30–18, 20–17, 29–14, 19–15
Pts: Clark 17; Rebs: Betts 8 Asts: Paopao 7		Pts: Contell 20; Rebs: Buenavida, Lamana 4 Asts: Contell, Sánchez 3

Hódos Imre Sportcsarnok, Debrecen
Attendance: 50
Referees: Paulo Marques (POR), Jelena Smiljanić (SRB), Alexey Stepanenko (KAZ)

=== 13–16th place semifinals ===
14 August 2021
11:00

Boxscore

Chinese Taipei	86–70	Brazil
Scoring by quarter: 20–17, 22–16, 26–16, 18–21
Pts: Chen C. 21; Rebs: Kuo 10; Asts: Chen C., Li Y. 5		Pts: Aneas 15; Rebs: Mair. Pereira 10; Asts: D'arrigo Soares 6

Oláh Gábor Sport Hall, Debrecen
Attendance: 0
Referees: Mihkel Männiste (EST), Alexandra Stan (ROU), Yann Davidson (MAD)

14 August 2021
14:00

Boxscore

Argentina	48–57	South Korea
Scoring by quarter: 18–5, 8–18, 11–15, 11–19
Pts: Bazán, Tondi 8 Rebs: Toledano 9 Asts: Tondi 4		Pts: Lee 16; Rebs: Lee 14; Asts: Park So. 6

Oláh Gábor Sport Hall, Debrecen
Attendance: 10
Referees: Gatis Saliņš (LAT), Paulo Marques (POR), Veronika Vávrová (CZE)

=== 9–12th place semifinals ===
14 August 2021
17:00

Boxscore

Japan	88–51	Italy
Scoring by quarter: 26–10, 13–13, 26–13, 23–15
Pts: Ogita 15; Rebs: Tanaka 7 Asts: Yamada 6		Pts: Panzera 18; Rebs: Colognesi 7 Asts: Allievi, Panzera 3

Oláh Gábor Sport Hall, Debrecen
Attendance: 0
Referees: Johnny Batista (PUR), Leong Chuen Wing (SIN), Carlos Vélez (COL)

14 August 2021
20:00

Boxscore

France	103–35	Egypt
Scoring by quarter: 34–8, 22–5, 21–13, 26–9
Pts: Astier 24; Rebs: Diarisso, Roumy 8 Asts: Astier 8		Pts: Ismail 11; Rebs: Elfiky 6 Asts: Bahgat 3

Oláh Gábor Sport Hall, Debrecen
Attendance: 10
Referees: Felipe Valenzuela (CHI), Alexey Davydov (RUS), Lee Ji-youn (KOR)

=== 5–8th place semifinals ===
14 August 2021
11:30

Boxscore

Canada	66–58	Russia
Scoring by quarter: 15–11, 20–29, 15–4, 16–14
Pts: Day-Wilson 22; Rebs: Day-Wilson 11; Asts: Day-Wilson, Lee 2		Pts: Kosu 13; Rebs: Kosu 11; Asts: Koshechkina 6

Hódos Imre Sportcsarnok, Debrecen
Attendance: 10
Referees: Martin Horozov (BUL), Pavel Fuska (SVK), Aya Ahmed (EGY)

14 August 2021
14:30

Boxscore

Spain	63–66	Czech Republic
Scoring by quarter: 16–16, 16–18, 15–18, 16–14
Pts: Contell 12; Rebs: Buenavida 7 Asts: four players 2		Pts: Paurová 17; Rebs: Paurová 7 Asts: Zeithammerová 7

Hódos Imre Sportcsarnok, Debrecen
Attendance: 30
Referees: Gina Cross (USA), Siniša Prpa (SRB), Nicolás Flores (URU)

=== Semifinals ===
14 August 2021
17:30

Boxscore

United States	75–42	Hungary
Scoring by quarter: 13–5, 22–10, 28–17, 12–10
Pts: Citron 17; Rebs: Betts 12; Asts: Fudd 4		Pts: Boros 14; Rebs: Boros 5 Asts: Dombai 4

Hódos Imre Sportcsarnok, Debrecen
Attendance: 200
Referees: Andrei Sharapa (BLR), Jelena Smiljanić (SRB), Kristian Paez (ECU)

14 August 2021
20:30

Boxscore

Australia	62–50	Mali
Scoring by quarter: 14–12, 17–12, 7–9, 24–17
Pts: Melbourne 19; Rebs: Puoch 9 Asts: Deeble, Melbourne 5		Pts: S. Koné 15; Rebs: S. Koné 19; Asts: F. Koné 4

Hódos Imre Sportcsarnok, Debrecen
Attendance: 50
Referees: Tomas Jasevičius (LTU), Christine Vuong (CAN), Alexandre Deman (FRA)

=== 15th place game ===
15 August 2021
08:30

Boxscore

Brazil	63–69	Argentina
Scoring by quarter: 16–13, 21–20, 17–17, 9–19
Pts: Mais. Pereira 17; Rebs: Mais. Pereira 13; Asts: Aneas 7		Pts: Maza 14; Rebs: Vilches 6 Asts: three players 4

Oláh Gábor Sport Hall, Debrecen
Attendance: 10
Referees: Goran Šljivić (AUT), Carlos Vélez (COL), Alexey Stepanenko (KAZ)

=== 13th place game ===
15 August 2021
11:30

Boxscore

Chinese Taipei	50–55	South Korea
Scoring by quarter: 13–17, 12–16, 12–13, 13–9
Pts: Chen C. 15; Rebs: Chen C. 9 Asts: Li Y. 4		Pts: Lee 14; Rebs: Lee 18; Asts: three players 4

Oláh Gábor Sport Hall, Debrecen
Attendance: 0
Referees: Andrei Sharapa (BLR), Aya Ahmed (EGY), Yann Davidson (MAD)

=== Eleventh place game ===
15 August 2021
14:30

Boxscore

Italy	80–66	Egypt
Scoring by quarter: 21–23, 24–13, 18–13, 17–17
Pts: Natali 1 Rebs: Egwoh 7 Asts: three players 4		Pts: Kabil 18; Rebs: Hussein 16; Asts: Abdellatif 6

Oláh Gábor Sport Hall, Debrecen
Attendance: 0
Referees: Alexey Davydov (RUS), Siniša Prpa (SRB), Leong Chuen Wing (SIN)

=== Ninth place game ===
15 August 2021
17:30

Boxscore

Japan	68–62	France
Scoring by quarter: 21–16, 13–10, 19–15, 15–21
Pts: Hirashita 23; Rebs: Hirashita 9 Asts: three players 2		Pts: Astier 17; Rebs: Bussière 6 Asts: Lacan 7

Oláh Gábor Sport Hall, Debrecen
Attendance: 0
Referees: Martin Horozov (BUL), Jelena Smiljanić (SRB), Nicolás Flores (URU)

=== Seventh place game ===
15 August 2021
11:30

Boxscore

Spain	60–51	Russia
Scoring by quarter: 21–14, 14–11, 9–12, 16–14
Pts: Lamana 12; Rebs: Buenavida, García 6 Asts: Lamana 4		Pts: Koshechkina 12; Rebs: Sirazutdinova 9 Asts: Rodionova 4

Hódos Imre Sportcsarnok, Debrecen
Attendance: 20
Referees: Gina Cross (USA), Alexandre Deman (FRA), Felipe Valenzuela (CHI)

=== Fifth place game ===
15 August 2021
14:30

Boxscore

Czech Republic	61–72	Canada
Scoring by quarter: 5–23, 20–19, 19–18, 17–12
Pts: Paurová 14; Rebs: Malíková 7 Asts: four players 3		Pts: Ejim 12; Rebs: Ejim 13; Asts: Day-Wilson 7

Hódos Imre Sportcsarnok, Debrecen
Attendance: 20
Referees: Tomas Jasevičius (LTU), Paulo Marques (POR), Lee Ji-youn (KOR)

=== Third place game ===
15 August 2021
17:30

Boxscore

Hungary	88–67	Mali
Scoring by quarter: 18–14, 24–17, 20–18, 26–18
Pts: Boros 25; Rebs: three players 6 Asts: three players 6		Pts: S. Koné 25; Rebs: S. Koné 16; Asts: F. Koné 9

Hódos Imre Sportcsarnok, Debrecen
Attendance: 0
Referees: Johnny Batista (PUR), Christine Vuong (CAN), Mihkel Männiste (EST)

=== Final ===
15 August 2021
20:30

Boxscore

United States	70–52	Australia
Scoring by quarter: 18–14, 18–14, 19–10, 15–14
Pts: Johnson 15; Rebs: Betts 14; Asts: Clark 8		Pts: Deeble 13; Rebs: Prior 6 Asts: Melbourne 4

Hódos Imre Sportcsarnok, Debrecen
Attendance: 300
Referees: Gatis Saliņš (LAT), Esperanza Mendoza (ESP), Kristian Paez (ECU)

== Final standings ==
Rank	Team	Record
1st place, gold medalist(s)	United States	7–0
2nd place, silver medalist(s)	Australia	5–2
3rd place, bronze medalist(s)	Hungary	5–2
4th	Mali	4–3
5th	Canada	4–3
6th	Czech Republic	4–3
7th	Spain	4–3
8th	Russia	4–3
9th	Japan	4–3
10th	France	5–2
11th	Italy	3–4
12th	Egypt	1–6
13th	South Korea	3–4
14th	Chinese Taipei	1–6
15th	Argentina	2–5
16th	Brazil	0–7

== Statistics and awards ==
=== Statistical leaders ===
==== Players ====
Points

Name	PPG
(Mali) Sika Koné	19.7
(Canada) Shayeann Day-Wilson	18.1
(Czech Republic) Dominika Paurová	16.2
(Russia) Olairi Kosu	15.7
(France) Pauline Astier	15.0
(Hungary) Júlia Boros	15.0

Rebounds

Name	RPG
(Mali) Sika Koné	14.8
(Russia) Olairi Kosu	12.8
(United States) Lauren Betts	9.6
(Canada) Yvonne Ejim	9.4
(Egypt) Yara Hussein	9.3

Assists

Name	APG
(Mali) Fanta Koné	6.5
(Canada) Shayeann Day-Wilson	5.7
(France) Leïla Lacan	5.7
(United States) Caitlin Clark	5.6
(United States) Te-Hina Paopao	4.6

Blocks

Name	BPG
(Russia) Ekaterina Koshechkina	2.0
(United States) Lauren Betts	1.9
(Russia) Olairi Kosu	1.8
(Argentina) Georgina Buzzetti	1.3
(Canada) Yvonne Ejim	1.3
(Czech Republic) Martina Pokorná	1.3

Steals

Name	SPG
(Spain) Laia Lamana	3.6
(Spain) Claudia Contell	3.1
(France) Louise Bussière	2.6
(Hungary) Réka Dombai	2.6
(Chinese Taipei) Chen Chih-ying	2.3
(Egypt) Salma Ismail	2.3
(United States) Diamond Johnson	2.3

Efficiency

Name	EFFPG
(Mali) Sika Koné	26.2
(Russia) Olairi Kosu	23.5
(United States) Sonia Citron	20.1
(France) Louise Bussière	19.6
(Canada) Yvonne Ejim	18.9

==== Team ====
Points

Name	PPG
United States	94.9
France	77.4
Japan	75.6
Canada	71.6
Mali	71.3

Rebounds

Name	RPG
United States	54.6
Canada	51.7
Mali	50.8
Russia	48.0
Australia	47.0

Assists

Name	APG
United States	26.0
France	21.4
Mali	19.0
Russia	18.1
Japan	18.0

Blocks

Name	BPG
United States	6.7
France	5.3
Russia	5.3
Australia	4.3
Argentina	3.7
Hungary	3.7

Steals

Name	SPG
Spain	14.3
Hungary	13.7
France	12.6
Italy	12.4
Czech Republic	11.2

Efficiency

Name	EFFPG
United States	132.9
France	95.4
Japan	82.9
Mali	81.2
Spain	81.1

=== Awards ===
The awards were announced on 15 August 2021.

Award	Winner	Team
Most Valuable Player	Caitlin Clark	United States
All-Tournament Team	Caitlin Clark	United States
All-Tournament Team	Sonia Citron	United States
All-Tournament Team	Jade Melbourne	Australia
All-Tournament Team	Júlia Boros	Hungary
All-Tournament Team	Sika Koné	Mali
