= Indonesia women's national under-18 basketball team =

Indonesia women's U-18
- FIBA zone: FIBA Asia
- National federation: PERBASI

U19 World Cup
- Appearances: None

U18 Asia Cup
- Appearances: 8
- Medals: None

U18 Asia Cup Division B
- Appearances: 1
- Medals: Bronze: 1 (2026)

The Indonesia women's national under-18 basketball team is a national basketball team of Indonesia, administered by the Indonesian Basketball Association ("PERBASI"). It represents the country in international under-18 women's basketball competitions.

== FIBA U18 Women's Asia Cup participations ==
Year	Division A	Division B
1980	8th	
1990	9th	
1992	7th	
2008	10th	
2016	7th	
2018	7th	
2022	7th	
2024	8th	
2026		3rd place, bronze medalist(s)

== See also ==
- Indonesia women's national basketball team
- Indonesia women's national under-16 basketball team
- Indonesia men's national under-18 basketball team
