= 1972 ABC Under-18 Championship for Women =

1972 FIBA U18 Women's Asia Cup
2nd FIBA Under-18 Women's Asian Basketball Championship

Tournament details
- Host country: Philippines
- Dates: December 10–20
- Teams: 3 (from all Asian federations)
- Venue: 1 (in 1 host city)

Final positions
- Champions: South Korea (2nd title)

The 1972 ABC Under-18 Championship for Women was the second edition of the Asian Basketball Confederation (ABC)'s junior championship. The games were held at Manila, Philippines from December 10–December 20, 1972.

South Korea were able to retain the championship by sweeping all of their assignments, blasting Taiwan, 85-59, in the final day.

== Results ==
Team	Pld	W	L	Pts
South Korea	4	4	0	8
Taiwan	4	2	2	6
Philippines	4	0	4	4

December 10

Report1 Report2

South Korea	97–60	Taiwan
Scoring by half: 46-28, 51-32

Rizal Memorial Coliseum, Manila

December 12

Report

Taiwan	86–43	Philippines
Scoring by half: 37−26, 49−17

Rizal Memorial Coliseum, Manila

December 14

Report

Philippines	34–89	South Korea
Scoring by half: 18−55, 16−32

Rizal Memorial Coliseum, Manila

December 16

Report

Philippines	40–64	Taiwan
Scoring by half: 23-26, 17-38

Rizal Memorial Coliseum, Manila

December 18

Report1 Report2

South Korea	120–25	Philippines
Scoring by half: 51-10, 69-15

Rizal Memorial Coliseum, Manila

December 20

Report
Report

Taiwan	59–85	South Korea
Scoring by half: 27−39, 32−46

Rizal Memorial Coliseum, Manila

== Final standing ==
Rank	Team	Record
1st place, gold medalist(s)	South Korea	4–0
2nd place, silver medalist(s)	Taiwan	2–2
3rd place, bronze medalist(s)	Philippines	0–4

== Awards ==
1972 Asian Under-18 champions

South Korea
Second title
