= 2012 FIBA Asia Under-18 Championship for Women =

21st FIBA Under-18 Women's Asian Basketball Championship
- Official logo of the 2012 FIBA Asia Under-18 Championship for Women

Tournament details
- Host country: Malaysia
- City: Johor Bahru
- Dates: 29 September – 6 October
- Teams: 12 (from 1 confederation)
- Venue: 1 (in 1 host city)

Final positions
- Champions: China (13th title)
- Runners-up: Japan
- Third place: South Korea

Tournament statistics
- Top scorer: (Hong Kong) Wong K.Y. (20.4)
- Top rebounds: (India) Jeena (13.6)
- Top assists: (Chinese Taipei) Huang Y.T. (7.3)
- PPG (Team): Japan (86.6)
- RPG (Team): India (55.0)
- APG (Team): India (18.8)

Official website
- 2012 FIBA Asia U-18 Championship for Women

The 2012 FIBA Asia Under-18 Championship for Women is FIBA Asia's basketball championship for females under 18 years old. The games were held at Johor Bahru, Malaysia from 29 September to 6 October 2012. China, Japan and Korea represented FIBA in the 2013 FIBA Under-19 World Championship for Women in Lithuania.

== Participating teams ==
Level I	Level II
China; Japan; Chinese Taipei; South Korea; Malaysia; Thailand	Hong Kong; India; Kazakhstan; Singapore; Sri Lanka; Uzbekistan

== Preliminary round ==
All times are local (UTC+08:00)

=== Level I ===
Team	Pld	W	L	PF	PA	PD	Pts
China	5	5	0	383	259	+124	10
Japan	5	4	1	433	298	+135	9
Chinese Taipei	5	3	2	392	333	+59	8
South Korea	5	2	3	361	373	-12	7
Thailand	5	1	4	259	387	-128	6
Malaysia	5	0	5	201	379	-178	5

September 29
16:00

Report Live Stats

China	79–69	Chinese Taipei
Scoring by quarter: 20-14, 20-13, 21-17, 18-25
Pts: Huang S.J. 21; Rebs: Huang S.J. 7 Asts: Zhang W.L. 4		Pts: Chen Y.Y. 16; Rebs: Chen W.A. 9 Asts: Huang Y.T. 6

Stadium Bandaraya, Johor Bahru
Referees: Anton Kozlov (KAZ), Zhao Jing (SIN), Premila Beruwalage (SRI)

September 29
18:00

Report Live Stats

South Korea	81–94	Japan
Scoring by quarter: 8-25, 17-20, 29-30, 27-19
Pts: Ku 21; Rebs: Ku 9 Asts: Kim L.S., Kim H.B. 4		Pts: Kawamura 23; Rebs: Kawamura 17; Asts: Fujioka 7

Stadium Bandaraya, Johor Bahru
Referees: Yevgeniy Mikheyev (KAZ), Tao Lai Ping (HKG), Mecky Fredrick Lobo (IND)

September 29
21:30

Report Live Stats

Malaysia	57–62	Thailand
Scoring by quarter: 25-9, 15-17, 5-19, 12-17
Pts: Low, Ng S.Y. 17; Rebs: Ng S.Y. 14; Asts: Tan H.Y., Low, Ng S.Y. 2		Pts: Daenkaewmoon 20; Rebs: Pinkaeng 6 Asts: Iam U Tama 3

Stadium Bandaraya, Johor Bahru
Referees: Lei Si Man (MAC), Kong Sin Mui (HKG), Tan Yee Nee (SIN)

September 30
17:00

Report Live Stats

Thailand	64–72	South Korea
Scoring by quarter: 22-18, 11-14, 16-12, 15-28
Pts: Iam U Tama, Klanbut 14; Rebs: Klanbut 8 Asts: Iam U Tama 6		Pts: Choi E.S. 18; Rebs: Choi E.S. 11; Asts: Kim L.S. 4

Stadium Bandaraya, Johor Bahru
Referees: Kong Sin Mui (HKG), Yevgeniy Mikheyev (KAZ), Zhao Jing (SIN)

September 30
19:00

Report Live Stats

Malaysia	20–78	China
Scoring by quarter: 4-15, 3-24, 6-21, 7-20
Pts: Ng S.Y. 8 Rebs: Teo C.Y. 3 Asts: 3 players 1		Pts: Zhang L.T. 16; Rebs: 3 players 7 Asts: Zhang J.H. 6

Stadium Bandaraya, Johor Bahru
Referees: Tan Yee Nee (SIN), Mecky Fredrick Lobo (IND), Tao Lai Ping (HKG)

September 30
21:00

Report Live Stats

Japan	85–77	Chinese Taipei
Scoring by quarter: 23–18, 9–17, 27–23, 26–19
Pts: Kawamura 29; Rebs: Kawamura 14; Asts: Miyazaki 4		Pts: Lin Y.T. 19; Rebs: Han Y.E. 15; Asts: Huang Y.T. 8

Stadium Bandaraya, Johor Bahru
Referees: Lei Si Man (MAC), Harja Jaladri (INA), Anton Kozlov (KAZ)

October 1
17:00

Report Live Stats

Chinese Taipei	74–58	Thailand
Scoring by quarter: 19–19, 16–15, 15–15, 24–9
Pts: Lin Y.T. 24; Rebs: Chen W.A. 10; Asts: Huang Y.T. 5		Pts: Daenkaewmoon 15; Rebs: Iam U Tama 11; Asts: 3 players 2

Stadium Bandaraya, Johor Bahru
Referees: Zhao Jing (SIN), Premila Beruwalage (SRI), Kong Sin Mui (HKG)

October 1
19:00

Report Live Stats

South Korea	71–55	Malaysia
Scoring by quarter: 15–11, 22–14, 16–15, 18–15
Pts: Kang L.S. 19; Rebs: Kim M.J. 14; Asts: Kim L.S. 7		Pts: Low 17; Rebs: Ng S.Y. 11; Asts: Teo C.Y. 4

Stadium Bandaraya, Johor Bahru
Referees: Lei Si Man (MAC), Mecky Fredrick Lobo (IND), Yevgeniy Mikheyev (KAZ)

October 1
21:00

Report Live Stats

Japan	67–73	China
Scoring by quarter: 12–17, 25–15, 8–19, 22–22
Pts: Kitamura 26; Rebs: Tamura 6 Asts: Miyazaki 3		Pts: Gong 17; Rebs: Gong 11; Asts: Yang L.W., Gong 3

Stadium Bandaraya, Johor Bahru
Referees: Harja Jaladri (INA), Anton Kozlov (KAZ), Tan Yee Nee (SIN)

October 2
17:00

Report Live Stats

Thailand	38–103	Japan
Scoring by quarter: 7–32, 7–31, 14–20, 10–20
Pts: Iam U Tama, Klanbut 8 Rebs: Iam U Tama, Pinkaeng 6 Asts: Iam U Tama 3		Pts: Kawakami 17; Rebs: Matsumoto 10; Asts: Tamura, Kawakami 5

Stadium Bandaraya, Johor Bahru
Referees: Tao Lai Ping (HKG), Premila Beruwalage (SRI), Prakash Paquiaraj Sandou (IND)

October 2
19:00

Report Live Stats

Malaysia	40–84	Chinese Taipei
Scoring by quarter: 10–26, 12–19, 10–24, 8–15
Pts: Low 12; Rebs: Lee 7 Asts: Lee P.L. 3		Pts: Ou 20; Rebs: Cheng Y.c. 11; Asts: Huang Y.T. 10

Stadium Bandaraya, Johor Bahru
Referees: Tan Yee Nee (SIN), Yevgeniy Mikheyev (KAZ), Kong Sin Mui (HKG)

October 2
21:00

Report Live Stats

China	72–66	South Korea
Scoring by quarter: 22–12, 11–24, 16–18, 23–12
Pts: Huang S.J. 20; Rebs: Zhang L.T., Hu Y.M. 8 Asts: Yang L.W. 5		Pts: Kim H.B. 17; Rebs: Kim H.B. 4 Asts: 3 players 2

Stadium Bandaraya, Johor Bahru
Referees: Harja Jaladri (INA), Lei Si Man (MAC), Anton Kozlov (KAZ)

October 3
17:00

Report Live Stats

Thailand	37–81	China
Scoring by quarter: 10–19, 9–20, 14–22, 4–20
Pts: Daenkaewmoon, Klanbut 10; Rebs: Iam U Tama 8 Asts: Iam U Tama 3		Pts: Gong 16; Rebs: Huang S.J. 9 Asts: Zhang W.L. 7

Stadium Bandaraya, Johor Bahru
Referees: Mecky Fredrick Lobo (IND), Tan Yee Nee (SIN), Premila Beruwalage (SRI)

October 3
19:00

Report Live Stats

Japan	84–29	Malaysia
Scoring by quarter: 24–10, 22–5, 21–7, 17–7
Pts: Masuoka 14; Rebs: Kato 10; Asts: Fujioka 5		Pts: Lee 11; Rebs: Tan H.Y. 7 Asts: Low 2

Stadium Bandaraya, Johor Bahru
Referees: Anton Kozlov (KAZ), Tao Lai Ping (HKG), Prakash Paquiaraj Sandou (IND)

October 3
21:00

Report Live Stats

Chinese Taipei	88–71	South Korea
Scoring by quarter: 20–14, 22–18, 23–17, 23–22
Pts: Huang L.C. 22; Rebs: Chen W.A. 9 Asts: Huang Y.T. 14		Pts: Kim H.B. 18; Rebs: Kang L.S. 7 Asts: Shin J.H. 3

Stadium Bandaraya, Johor Bahru
Referees: Lei Si Man (MAC), Harja Jaladri (INA), Zhao Jing (SIN)

=== Level II ===
Team	Pld	W	L	PF	PA	PD	Pts
India	4	4	0	365	212	+153	8
Hong Kong	4	3	1	341	201	+140	7
Kazakhstan	4	2	2	265	282	-17	6
Singapore	4	1	3	215	298	-83	5
Sri Lanka	4	0	4	146	339	-193	4

September 29
10:00

Sri Lanka	20–0	Uzbekistan
Forfeit

Stadium Bandaraya, Johor Bahru

September 29
12:00

Report Live Stats

Hong Kong	93–52	Kazakhstan
Scoring by quarter: 18-13, 30-11, 20-17, 25-11
Pts: Wong K.Y. 25; Rebs: Leung, Li T.K. 10; Asts: Leung 6		Pts: Moldakhmetova 13; Rebs: Moldakhmetova 14; Asts: Moldakhmetova, Bagmet 3

Stadium Bandaraya, Johor Bahru

September 29
14:00

Report Live Stats

Singapore	53–93	India
Scoring by quarter: 18-24, 12-22, 13-23, 10-24
Pts: See 16; Rebs: Lim 7 Asts: Tok H.M., Lim 2		Pts: Jeena 28; Rebs: Limaye 13; Asts: Limaye 9

Stadium Bandaraya, Johor Bahru

September 30
11:00

Uzbekistan	0–20	Singapore
Forfeit

Stadium Bandaraya, Johor Bahru

September 30
13:00

Live Stats

Sri Lanka	25–83	Hong Kong
Scoring by quarter: 7–30, 7–28, 6–14, 5–11
Pts: Marasinghege 7 Rebs: Marasinghege 11; Asts: Ravindran 2		Pts: Li T.K. 21; Rebs: Chan W.P., Liu W.S. 11; Asts: Wong M.S. 5

Stadium Bandaraya, Johor Bahru

September 30
15:00

Report Live Stats

India	82–65	Kazakhstan
Scoring by quarter: 21–17, 19–18, 19–15, 23–15
Pts: Sh. Kaur 22; Rebs: Jeena 15; Asts: Limaye, Sh. Kaur 4		Pts: Moldakhmetova 21; Rebs: Li 12; Asts: Moldakhmetova 4

Stadium Bandaraya, Johor Bahru

October 1
11:00

Live Stats

India	76–67	Hong Kong
Scoring by quarter: 19–13, 18–18, 20–16, 19–20
Pts: Chaturvedi 32; Rebs: Chaturvedi 17; Asts: Sh. Kaur 16		Pts: Wong K.Y. 30; Rebs: Chan W.P. 12; Asts: Wong M.S. 7

Stadium Bandaraya, Johor Bahru

October 1
13:00

Report Live Stats

Singapore	55–46	Sri Lanka
Scoring by quarter: 12–9, 19–7, 15–13, 9–17
Pts: Lim, Han 10; Rebs: Lim 12; Asts: Tok H.M. 3		Pts: Ravindran 18; Rebs: Asmagoda 10; Asts: Warnakulasuriya 2

Stadium Bandaraya, Johor Bahru

October 1
15:00

Kazakhstan	vs.	Uzbekistan
NO GAME

Stadium Bandaraya, Johor Bahru

October 2
11:00

Uzbekistan	vs.	India
NO GAME

Stadium Bandaraya, Johor Bahru

October 2
13:00

Report Live Stats

Hong Kong	88–48	Singapore
Scoring by quarter: 17–11, 27–12, 12–9, 32–16
Pts: Wong M.S. 23; Rebs: 3 players 8 Asts: Wong K.Y. 5		Pts: Ang 11; Rebs: Lim 7 Asts: Lee Q.H 3

Stadium Bandaraya, Johor Bahru

October 2
15:00

Report Live Stats

Sri Lanka	48–77	Kazakhstan
Scoring by quarter: 14–21, 7–18, 11–19, 16–19
Pts: Pestheru 17; Rebs: Ravindran 9 Asts: Ravindran 5		Pts: Zlobina 16; Rebs: Otepbergen 11; Asts: Moldakhmetova 3

Stadium Bandaraya, Johor Bahru

October 3
11:00

Report Live Stats

India	114–27	Sri Lanka
Scoring by quarter: 25–13, 33–6, 27–2, 29–6
Pts: Jeena 24; Rebs: Jeena 16; Asts: Limaye 5		Pts: Pestheru 13; Rebs: Marasinghege 7 Asts: J. Siriwardana, Ravindran 2

Stadium Bandaraya, Johor Bahru

October 3
13:00

Uzbekistan	vs.	Hong Kong
NO GAME

Stadium Bandaraya, Johor Bahru

October 3
15:00

Report Live Stats

Kazakhstan	71–59	Singapore
Scoring by quarter: 9–15, 26–8, 21–15, 15–21
Pts: Moldakhmetova 29; Rebs: Moldakhmetova 10; Asts: Zlobina 6		Pts: Lim 16; Rebs: Han, Ang 9 Asts: Ong 2

Stadium Bandaraya, Johor Bahru

== Qualifying round ==
Winners are promoted to Level I for the 2014 championships.

October 5
15:00

Report Live Stats

Thailand	55–47	Hong Kong
Scoring by quarter: 12–14, 18–7, 14–11, 11–15
Pts: Klanbut 16; Rebs: Klanbut 12; Asts: Iam U Tama 4		Pts: Wong K.Y. 18; Rebs: Chan W.P. 17; Asts: Wong K.Y., Li T.K. 2

Stadium Bandaraya, Johor Bahru
Referees: Tomita Yoko (JPN), Yun Jong-Hyun (KOR), Tan Yee Nee (SIN)

October 5
17:00

Report Live Stats

Malaysia	59–60	India
Scoring by quarter: 11–15, 15–19, 12–12, 21–14
Pts: Ng S.Y. 17; Rebs: Ng S.Y. 17; Asts: Low, Yap Y.Y. 2		Pts: Jeena 24; Rebs: Priyadharshini 14; Asts: Kaur 4

Stadium Bandaraya, Johor Bahru
Referees: Lee Ji-Youn (KOR), Shi Jing (CHN), Tsung Hsiu-Hui (TPE)

== Final round ==
Semifinals
October 5
China	72
South Korea	46
October 5
Japan	113
Chinese Taipei	55

Final
October 6
China	66
Japan	60
3rd place
October 6
South Korea	61
Chinese Taipei	42

=== Semifinals ===
October 5
19:00

Live Stats

China	72–46	South Korea
Scoring by quarter: 20-10, 23-10, 8-16, 21-10
Pts: Yang L.W. 15; Rebs: Zhang J.H. 9 Asts: Zhang J.H., Yang L.W. 4		Pts: Ku 12; Rebs: Kang L.S. 7 Asts: Kang L.S. 2

Stadium Bandaraya, Johor Bahru
Referees: Harja Jaladri (INA), Yevgeniy Mikheyev (KAZ), Tee Yong Sern (MAS)

October 5
21:00

Report Live Stats

Japan	113–55	Chinese Taipei
Scoring by quarter: 27-21, 24-11, 32-13, 30-10
Pts: Kawamura, Miyazaki 16; Rebs: Matsumoto 10; Asts: Fujioka 5		Pts: Huang L.C. 11; Rebs: Huang Y.T. 7 Asts: Huang Y.T. 5

Stadium Bandaraya, Johor Bahru
Referees: Anton Kozlov (KAZ), Ng Cheng Hou (MAS), Lei Si-Man (MAC)

=== 3rd place ===
October 6
18:00

Report Live Stats

South Korea	61–42	Chinese Taipei
Scoring by quarter: 13-7, 11-11, 14-12, 23-12
Pts: Ku 20; Rebs: Kang L.S., Ku 12; Asts: You S.H. 3		Pts: Huang Y.T. 11; Rebs: Huang Y.T. 10; Asts: Huang Y.T., Chen Y.Y. 3

Stadium Bandaraya, Johor Bahru
Referees: Yevgeniy Mikheyev (KAZ), Tan Yee Nee (SIN), Harja Jaladri (INA)

=== Final ===
October 6
20:00

Report Live Stats

China	66–60	Japan
Scoring by quarter: 16-15, 14-23, 20-9, 16-13
Pts: Yang L.W. 20; Rebs: Qiang 14; Asts: Qiang 3		Pts: Miyazaki 13; Rebs: Kawamura 9 Asts: Fujioka 3

Stadium Bandaraya, Johor Bahru
Referees: Lei Si-Man (MAC), Anton Kozlov (KAZ), Ng Cheng Hou (MAS)

== Final standing ==
Qualified for the 2013 FIBA Under-19 World Championship for Women

Rank	Team	Record
1st place, gold medalist(s)	China	7–0
2nd place, silver medalist(s)	Japan	5–2
3rd place, bronze medalist(s)	South Korea	3–4
4	Chinese Taipei	3–4
5	Thailand	2–4
6	Malaysia	0–6
7	India	5–0
8	Hong Kong	3–2
9	Kazakhstan	2–2
10	Singapore	1–3
11	Sri Lanka	0–4

== Awards ==
2012 Asian Under-18 champions

China
Thirteenth title
