= 2018 FIBA U18 Women's Asian Championship =

24th FIBA Under-18 Women's Asian Basketball Championship

Tournament details
- Host country: India
- City: Bangalore
- Dates: 28 October − 3 November
- Teams: 16 (from 1 confederation)
- Venue: 2 (in 1 host city)

Final positions
- Champions: China (16th title)
- Runners-up: Japan
- Third place: Australia

Tournament statistics
- Top scorer: (Iran) Aghazadegan Ghazvini (23.4)
- Top rebounds: (China) Chen M.L. (14.5)
- Top assists: (China) Li Y. (7.5)
- PPG (Team): Japan (93.4)
- RPG (Team): Iran (64.8)
- APG (Team): India (25.2)

Official website
- 2018 FIBA U18 Women's Asian Championship Division A 2018 FIBA U18 Women's Asian Championship Division B

The 2018 FIBA U18 Women's Asian Championship was the qualifying tournament for FIBA Asia at the 2019 FIBA U19 Women's Basketball World Cup. The tournament, which was also the 24th edition of the biennial competition, was held in Bangalore, India from 28 October to 3 November. The top four teams qualified and will represent FIBA Asia in the 2019 FIBA U19 Women's Basketball World Cup in Thailand.

By virtue of topping their respective groups in Division A at the end of the preliminary round, South Korea and Japan earlier booked their spots in the U19 "Worlds", while Australia and China subdued their opponents in the qualification to the semifinals-round to also clinch their spot in the following year's tournament.

China defeated their old rivals Japan in the Final for the fifth straight time, with a score of 89-76, to annex their fifth straight title and sixteenth championship overall. Meanwhile, Australia avenged their preliminary-round loss to South Korea, with a score of 75-58, in the Bronze Medal Match.

== Venues ==
Bangalore	Karnataka
Sree Kanteerava Indoor Stadium	2018 FIBA U18 Women's Asian Championship (Karnataka)
Capacity: 4,000	2018 FIBA U18 Women's Asian Championship (Karnataka)
Koramangala Indoor Stadium	2018 FIBA U18 Women's Asian Championship (Karnataka)
Capacity: 2,000	2018 FIBA U18 Women's Asian Championship (Karnataka)

== Qualified teams ==
For Division A:

- Semifinalists of the 2016 FIBA Asia U18 Championship for Women:
  - China
  - Japan
  - South Korea
  - Chinese Taipei
- Qualifying round winners at the 2016 FIBA Asia U18 Championship for Women:
  - Malaysia
  - Indonesia
- Finalists from the 2017 FIBA U17 Women's Oceania Championship:
  - Australia
  - New Zealand

For Division B:

- The host nation, being relegated to Division B at the previous championship:
  - India
- Semifinalists from the 2017 FIBA U17 Women's Oceania Championship:
  - Samoa
  - Guam
- Early registrants for the Division B slots from FIBA Asia:
  - Hong Kong
  - Iran
  - Kazakhstan
  - Singapore
  - Syria

== Competition format ==
The sixteen participating teams will be divided into two divisions, Division A and Division B of eight teams each.

In each division, the eight participating teams are divided into two groups (A and B) of four teams each.

Each team shall play all the other teams within its own group. The final stage standings will be established after the games for a total of twelve are all played.

Teams that will finish first in each group will advance to the semifinal round, awaiting the winners of the qualification to semifinals round.

Teams that will finish second and third in each group will face the third-placed and second-placed team, respectively, in the other group within its own division for the qualification to semifinals round.

Winners of the qualification to semifinals round will face the outright semifinalists in the semifinal round. Losers will face each other for the fifth-sixth place classification round.

For the seventh-eighth place classification round, teams that will finish fourth in each group will face the other fourth-placed team in the other group within its own division.

For Division A, all semifinalists will qualify to the 2019 FIBA U19 Women's Basketball World Cup.

The Champion team from Division B will be promoted to Division A for the next championship, replacing the eighth-placed team in Division A that will be relegated to Division B for the next championship.

== Divisions ==
Division A will include teams that won in the 2016 qualifying round and the semifinalists of the previous championship. FIBA Oceania teams Australia and New Zealand, being the finalists of the 2017 FIBA U17 Women's Oceania Championship, will compete in the tournament for the first time and will be placed in the same division.

Included were, the FIBA World Rankings prior to the draw (as of 10 December 2016).

Division A	Division B
Australia (7); China (9); Japan (11); South Korea (15); Chinese Taipei (27); New Zealand (33); Malaysia (39); Indonesia (58)	India (37); Hong Kong (43); Kazakhstan (44); Iran (49); Singapore (51); Guam (70); Samoa (71); Syria (77)

== Division A ==
=== Preliminary round ===
The preliminary groups were announced on 11 October 2018 in Bengaluru, India.

==== Group A ====
Pos	Team	Pld	W	L	PF	PA	PD	Pts	Qualification
1	South Korea	3	3	0	211	158	+53	6	Advance to semifinals
2	Australia	3	2	1	264	157	+107	5	Qualification to qualifying round
3	Chinese Taipei	3	1	2	221	224	−3	4	Qualification to qualifying round
4	Indonesia	3	0	3	122	279	−157	3	Qualification to seventh place game

Source: FIBA
Rules for classification: (1) Tournament points, (2) Head-to-head tournament points, (3) Head-to-head goal average, (4) Overall goal average, (5) Drawing of lots

28 October 2018
11:00

Boxscore

Australia	96–28	Indonesia
Scoring by quarter: 23–2, 21–10, 23–9, 29–7
Pts: Anstey 20; Rebs: Anstey 12; Asts: Goodchild 4		Pts: Shoimah 8 Rebs: Alvaretta 7 Asts: Wongsohardjo 3

Kanteerava Indoor Stadium, Bangalore
Referees: Alexey Stepanenko (KAZ), Amarjot Singh Mavi (IND), Sharad Vasant Bansode (IND)

28 October 2018
15:30

Boxscore

South Korea	64–56	Chinese Taipei
Scoring by quarter: 20–13, 13–7, 20–26, 11–10
Pts: Park I.A. 16; Rebs: Lee H.R. 11; Asts: Park I.A., Lee S.H. 5		Pts: Chen Y.C., Lo P.Y. 11; Rebs: Chen Y.T. 7 Asts: Lo P.Y., Wu W.J., Hsu S.H. 2

Kanteerava Indoor Stadium, Bangalore
Referees: Mohammadreza Salehian (IRI), Ceciline Michael Vino Vincent Francis Victor (IND), Anton Kozlov (KAZ)

29 October 2018
11:00

Boxscore

Chinese Taipei	66–106	Australia
Scoring by quarter: 23–35, 13–26, 21–23, 9–22
Pts: Chen Y.C. 21; Rebs: Li Y.H. 6 Asts: Li Y.H., Lo P.Y. 3		Pts: Goodchild 27; Rebs: Hannan 12; Asts: Shelley 9

Kanteerava Indoor Stadium, Bangalore
Referees: Yevgeniy Mikheyev (KAZ), Imran Ali Baig (IND), Kasem Alhamwi (SYR)

29 October 2018
15:30

Boxscore

Indonesia	40–84	South Korea
Scoring by quarter: 6–20, 8–25, 16–24, 10–15
Pts: Aoijs 9 Rebs: Suwanto, Wongsohardjo 5 Asts: Suwanto 4		Pts: Park J.H. 20; Rebs: Park J.H., Eom S.I. 9 Asts: Park I.A. 7

Kanteerava Indoor Stadium, Bangalore
Referees: Snehal Bendke (IND), Allan Cheong (SGP), Sharad Vasant Bansode (IND)

30 October 2018
11:00

Boxscore

Australia	62–63	South Korea
Scoring by quarter: 10–13, 8–14, 21–21, 23–15
Pts: Anstey 19; Rebs: Anstey 15; Asts: Shelley 4		Pts: Lee S.H. 21; Rebs: Jung Y.R., Lee H.R. 7 Asts: Lee S.H. 7

Kanteerava Indoor Stadium, Bangalore
Referees: Mohammadreza Salehian (IRI), Anton Kozlov (KAZ), Ceciline Michael Vino Vincent Francis Victor (IND)

30 October 2018
13:15

Boxscore

Chinese Taipei	99–54	Indonesia
Scoring by quarter: 30–7, 22–13, 26–13, 21–21
Pts: Chen Y.C. 13; Rebs: Chen Y.C., Chen C.Y. 8 Asts: Hsu S.H. 10		Pts: Suwanto, Aoijs 15; Rebs: Aoijs 8 Asts: Wongsohardjo 4

Kanteerava Indoor Stadium, Bangalore
Referees: Snehal Bendke (IND), Allan Cheong (SGP), Kasem Alhamwi (SYR)

==== Group B ====
Pos	Team	Pld	W	L	PF	PA	PD	Pts	Qualification
1	Japan	3	3	0	301	172	+129	6	Advance to semifinals
2	China	3	2	1	248	180	+68	5	Qualification to qualifying round
3	New Zealand	3	1	2	219	176	+43	4	Qualification to qualifying round
4	Malaysia	3	0	3	91	331	−240	3	Qualification to seventh place game

Source: FIBA
Rules for classification: (1) Tournament points, (2) Head-to-head tournament points, (3) Head-to-head goal average, (4) Overall goal average, (5) Drawing of lots

28 October 2018
13:15

Boxscore

China	102–28	Malaysia
Scoring by quarter: 18–10, 25–4, 37–3, 22–11
Pts: Chen M.L. 19; Rebs: Chen M.L. 21; Asts: Zheng, Yang S.Y. 4		Pts: Tan S.J. 12; Rebs: Yong S.L. 5 Asts: Tan S.J. 3

Kanteerava Indoor Stadium, Bangalore
Referees: Snehal Bendke (IND), Allan Cheong (SGP), Peter Sonthosh Divaker (IND)

28 October 2018
17:45

Boxscore

Japan	77–62	New Zealand
Scoring by quarter: 23–13, 18–16, 11–21, 25–12
Pts: Konno 16; Rebs: Takehara 9 Asts: Umeki, Todo 4		Pts: Whittaker 23; Rebs: Leger-Walker 13; Asts: Leger-Walker 4

Kanteerava Indoor Stadium, Bangalore
Referees: Yevgeniy Mikheyev (KAZ), Imran Ali Baig (IND), Fahimeh Alimoradihamedan (IRI)

29 October 2018
13:15

Boxscore

New Zealand	58–67	China
Scoring by quarter: 16–13, 11–17, 13–18, 18–19
Pts: Leger-Walker 22; Rebs: Leger-Walker 8 Asts: Leger-Walker 5		Pts: Chen M.L. 15; Rebs: Tang Z.T., Chen M.L. 11; Asts: Li Y. 9

Kanteerava Indoor Stadium, Bangalore
Referees: Mohammadreza Salehian (IRI), Amarjot Singh Mavi (IND), Anton Kozlov (KAZ)

29 October 2018
17:45

Boxscore

Malaysia	31–130	Japan
Scoring by quarter: 7–36, 8–34, 8–26, 8–34
Pts: Tan S.J. 11; Rebs: Yong S.L. 8 Asts: Yong S.L. 2		Pts: Yamashita 23; Rebs: Yamashita 18; Asts: Ikeda 9

Kanteerava Indoor Stadium, Bangalore
Referees: Alexey Stepanenko (KAZ), Ceciline Michael Vino Vincent Francis Victor (IND), Peter Sonthosh Divaker (IND)

30 October 2018
15:30

Boxscore

China	79–94	Japan
Scoring by quarter: 24–23, 21–18, 16–29, 18–24
Pts: Li Y., Chen M.L. 16; Rebs: Chen M.L. 15; Asts: Li Y. 9		Pts: Konno 19; Rebs: McArthur 6 Asts: Ishihara 5

Kanteerava Indoor Stadium, Bangalore
Referees: Yevgeniy Mikheyev (KAZ), Imran Ali Baig (IND), Amarjot Singh Mavi (IND)

30 October 2018
17:45

Boxscore

New Zealand	99–32	Malaysia
Scoring by quarter: 29–12, 26–7, 22–6, 22–7
Pts: Whittaker 18; Rebs: Bradley 12; Asts: Lewis 8		Pts: Chan W.Y. 10; Rebs: Hin J.W., Lee L.X. 4 Asts: Yong S.L. 3

Kanteerava Indoor Stadium, Bangalore
Referees: Alexey Stepanenko (KAZ), Fahimeh Alimoradihamedan (IRI), Sharad Vasant Bansode (IND)

=== Knockout round ===
==== Bracket ====
Qualification to Semifinals
1 November
China	80
Chinese Taipei	53
1 November
Australia	82
New Zealand	66

Semifinals
2 November
South Korea	51
China	69
2 November
Japan	90
Australia	77

Finals
3 November
China	89
Japan	76
Third Place
3 November
South Korea	58
Australia	75

==== Seventh place game ====
1 November 2018
13:00

Boxscore

Indonesia	86–35	Malaysia
Scoring by quarter: 16–6, 25–9, 27–11, 18–9
Pts: Aoijs 22; Rebs: Wongsohardjo 14; Asts: 4 players 3		Pts: Tan S.J. 13; Rebs: Yong S.L. 5 Asts: Tang S.X. 2

Kanteerava Indoor Stadium, Bangalore
Referees: Snehal Bendke (IND), Anton Kozlov (KAZ), Fahimeh Alimoradihamedan (IRI)

==== Qualification to Semifinals ====
1 November 2018
15:30

Boxscore

Australia	82–66	New Zealand
Scoring by quarter: 23–15, 18–10, 24–19, 17–22
Pts: Palmer, Goodchild, Anstey 13; Rebs: Anstey 12; Asts: Shelley 6		Pts: Bradley 14; Rebs: Bradley 12; Asts: Dalton 3

Kanteerava Indoor Stadium, Bangalore
Referees: Yevgeniy Mikheyev (KAZ), Imran Ali Baig (IND), Kasem Alhamwi (SYR)

1 November 2018
17:45

Boxscore

China	80–53	Chinese Taipei
Scoring by quarter: 27–14, 19–10, 12–13, 22–16
Pts: Li Y. 20; Rebs: Chen M.L. 15; Asts: Li Y. 11		Pts: Chen Y.C. 16; Rebs: Hung H.C., Chen Y.T., Cheng H.T. 5 Asts: Chen Y.C. 3

Kanteerava Indoor Stadium, Bangalore
Referees: Alexey Stepanenko (KAZ), Mohammadreza Salehian (IRI), Peter Sonthosh Divaker (IND)

==== Fifth place game ====
2 November 2018
13:00

Boxscore

New Zealand	75–47	Chinese Taipei
Scoring by quarter: 14–9, 23–12, 19–18, 19–8
Pts: Leger-Walker 18; Rebs: Mafua, Leger-Walker 10; Asts: Dalton 6		Pts: Chen Y.C. 16; Rebs: Li Y.H. 5 Asts: Li Y.H. 2

Kanteerava Indoor Stadium, Bangalore
Referees: Snehal Bendke (IND), Shin Gi-Rok (KOR), Shigeyuki Arisawa (JPN)

==== Semifinals ====
2 November 2018
15:30

Boxscore

South Korea	51–69	China
Scoring by quarter: 13–24, 12–15, 16–13, 10–17
Pts: Park J.H. 20; Rebs: Park J.H. 10; Asts: Lee S.H., Park J.H., Lee H.R. 3		Pts: Chen M.L. 19; Rebs: Chen M.L. 11; Asts: Li Y. 6

Kanteerava Indoor Stadium, Bangalore
Referees: Yevgeniy Mikheyev (KAZ), Chan Owe Shiong (MAS), Ceciline Michael Vino Vincent Francis Victor (IND)

2 November 2018
17:45

Boxscore

Japan	90–77	Australia
Scoring by quarter: 21–12, 17–27, 30–12, 22–26
Pts: Todo 21; Rebs: Okuyama 10; Asts: Konno 6		Pts: Goodchild 26; Rebs: Shelley 10; Asts: Emma-Nnopu, Goodchild 5

Kanteerava Indoor Stadium, Bangalore
Referees: Yevgeniy Mikheyev (KAZ), Chan Owe Shiong (MAS), Ceciline Michael Vino Vincent Francis Victor (IND)

==== Third place game ====
3 November 2018
14:15

Boxscore

South Korea	58–75	Australia
Scoring by quarter: 8–12, 20–16, 21–26, 9–21
Pts: Park J.H., Lee H.R. 17; Rebs: Lee H.R. 9 Asts: Shin L.S., Lee S.H. 3		Pts: Goodchild 21; Rebs: Emma-Nnopu 17; Asts: Shelley 5

Kanteerava Indoor Stadium, Bangalore
Referees: Snehal Bendke (IND), Alexey Stepanenko (KAZ), Ryoko Odanaka (JPN)

==== Final ====
3 November 2018
19:00

Boxscore

China	89–76	Japan
Scoring by quarter: 19–22, 19–16, 24–12, 27–26
Pts: Li Y. 28; Rebs: Chen M.L. 14; Asts: Li Y. 8		Pts: Umeki 20; Rebs: Takehara 8 Asts: Ishihara, Todo 4

Kanteerava Indoor Stadium, Bangalore
Referees: Yevgeniy Mikheyev (KAZ), Harja Jaladri (INA), Damian James Lyons (AUS)

== Division B ==
All times are local (UTC+05:30)

=== Preliminary round ===
The preliminary groups were announced on 11 October 2018 in Bengaluru, India.

==== Group A ====
Pos	Team	Pld	W	L	PF	PA	PD	Pts	Qualification
1	India (H)	3	3	0	259	156	+103	6	Advance to semifinals
2	Iran	3	2	1	233	181	+52	5	Qualification to qualifying round
3	Singapore	3	1	2	185	184	+1	4	Qualification to qualifying round
4	Guam	3	0	3	132	288	−156	3	Qualification to seventh place game

Source: FIBA
Rules for classification: (1) Tournament points, (2) Head-to-head tournament points, (3) Head-to-head goal average, (4) Overall goal average, (5) Drawing of lots
(H) Hosts

28 October 2018
15:45

Boxscore

Singapore	83–35	Guam
Scoring by quarter: 35–10, 9–9, 17–12, 22–4
Pts: Tang, Wong 18; Rebs: Han X.Y. 19; Asts: Wong 6		Pts: San Nicolas 14; Rebs: San Nicolas 8 Asts: Perez 8

Koramangala Indoor Stadium, Bangalore
Referees: Shin Gi-Rok (KOR), Fang Wenxuan (CHN), Chiang Meng-chen (TPE)

28 October 2018
20:00

Boxscore

India	73–65	Iran
Scoring by quarter: 23–13, 17–22, 16–12, 17–18
Pts: Rani 19; Rebs: Chenganamattathil 15; Asts: Rani 7		Pts: Aghazadegan Ghazvini 22; Rebs: Rasoulipour Khameneh 14; Asts: Karimi 4

Kanteerava Indoor Stadium, Bangalore
Referees: Harja Jaladri (INA), Ryoko Odanaka (JPN), Chan Owe Shiong (MAS)

29 October 2018
15:45

Boxscore

Iran	70–53	Singapore
Scoring by quarter: 22–9, 12–12, 27–16, 9–16
Pts: Aghazadegan Ghazvini 28; Rebs: Rasoulipour Khameneh 12; Asts: Aghazadegan Ghazvini 4		Pts: Wong 19; Rebs: Han X.Y. 10; Asts: Han X.Y. 6

Koramangala Indoor Stadium, Bangalore
Referees: Martin Davison (NZL), Shin Gi-Rok (KOR), Hu Jing (CHN)

29 October 2018
20:00

Boxscore

Guam	42–107	India
Scoring by quarter: 9–28, 13–22, 9–35, 11–22
Pts: Perez 12; Rebs: Cruz, Perez 6 Asts: Almario, Perez 2		Pts: Suren 19; Rebs: Thirunavukkarasu, Suren 9 Asts: Ali 8

Kanteerava Indoor Stadium, Bangalore
Referees: Shigeyuki Arisawa (JPN), Chan Owe Shiong (MAS), Wong Sing Hui (MAS)

30 October 2018
15:45

Boxscore

Guam	55–98	Iran
Scoring by quarter: 19–18, 8–29, 14–18, 14–33
Pts: San Nicolas 21; Rebs: San Nicolas 11; Asts: Cruz 5		Pts: Aghazadegan Ghazvini 28; Rebs: Rasoulipour Khameneh 24; Asts: Rasoulipour Khameneh, Goodarzi 3

Koramangala Indoor Stadium, Bangalore
Referees: Ryoko Odanaka (JPN), Chiang Meng-chen (TPE), Lee Kyoung-Hwan (KOR)

30 October 2018
20:00

Boxscore

India	79–49	Singapore
Scoring by quarter: 20–3, 18–22, 25–11, 16–13
Pts: Ali 21; Rebs: Kelttira, Senthil 12; Asts: Thirunavukkarasu, Kelttira 5		Pts: Wong 12; Rebs: Han X.Y. 7 Asts: Chua 3

Kanteerava Indoor Stadium, Bangalore
Referees: Martin Davison (NZL), Fang Wenxuan (CHN), Shin Gi-Rok (KOR)

==== Group B ====
Pos	Team	Pld	W	L	PF	PA	PD	Pts	Qualification
1	Syria	3	3	0	166	124	+42	6	Advance to semifinals
2	Hong Kong	3	2	1	205	189	+16	5	Qualification to qualifying round
3	Kazakhstan	3	1	2	180	187	−7	4	Qualification to qualifying round
4	Samoa	3	0	3	138	189	−51	3	Qualification to seventh place game

Source: FIBA
Rules for classification: (1) Tournament points, (2) Head-to-head tournament points, (3) Head-to-head goal average, (4) Overall goal average, (5) Drawing of lots

28 October 2018
13:30

Boxscore

Hong Kong	78–50	Samoa
Scoring by quarter: 21–11, 21–13, 18–15, 18–11
Pts: Poon W.N. 22; Rebs: Shek M.N. 16; Asts: Shek M.N. 4		Pts: Niu 9 Rebs: J. Taufua 13; Asts: C. Manumaleuga 3

Koramangala Indoor Stadium, Bangalore
Referees: Martin Davison (NZL), Wong Sing Hui (MAS), Park Kyoung-Jin (KOR)

28 October 2018
18:00

Boxscore

Kazakhstan	40–56	Syria
Scoring by quarter: 6–14, 6–12, 13–16, 15–14
Pts: Motovilova 11; Rebs: Zaitseva 13; Asts: 4 players 2		Pts: Aghnanian 25; Rebs: Aghnanian 15; Asts: Hammoud, Alhaj Ali 3

Koramangala Indoor Stadium, Bangalore
Referees: Shigeyuki Arisawa (JPN), Hu Jing (CHN), Damian James Lyons (AUS)

29 October 2018
13:30

Boxscore

Samoa	51–67	Kazakhstan
Scoring by quarter: 13–19, 11–19, 16–15, 11–14
Pts: C. Manumaleuga 18; Rebs: Harder, J. Taufua 10; Asts: C. Manumaleuga, M. Manumaleuga 3		Pts: Motovilova 17; Rebs: Motovilova 12; Asts: Komarova 4

Koramangala Indoor Stadium, Bangalore
Referees: Lee Kyoung-Hwan (KOR), Ryoko Odanaka (JPN), Fang Wenxuan (CHN)

29 October 2018
18:00

Boxscore

Syria	66–47	Hong Kong
Scoring by quarter: 11–9, 14–15, 25–11, 16–12
Pts: Bshara 25; Rebs: Aghnanian 22; Asts: Alhaj Ali, Aghnanian 3		Pts: Chan W.Y. 16; Rebs: Ho P.Y., Shek M.N. 8 Asts: Yu 3

Koramangala Indoor Stadium, Bangalore
Referees: Harja Jaladri (INA), Damian James Lyons (AUS), Park Kyoung-Jin (KOR)

30 October 2018
13:30

Boxscore

Hong Kong	80–73	Kazakhstan
Scoring by quarter: 15–18, 18–22, 29–14, 18–19
Pts: Ho P.Y. 22; Rebs: Shek M.N. 10; Asts: Ho P.Y. 7		Pts: Kulikova 21; Rebs: Zaitseva 17; Asts: Kulikova, Motovilova 5

Koramangala Indoor Stadium, Bangalore
Referees: Harja Jaladri (INA), Shigeyuki Arisawa (JPN), Chan Owe Shiong (MAS)

30 October 2018
18:00

Boxscore

Samoa	37–44	Syria
Scoring by quarter: 12–7, 8–19, 4–13, 13–5
Pts: Stowers, J. Taufua 10; Rebs: Harder 12; Asts: Niu 5		Pts: Aghnanian 19; Rebs: Aghnanian 11; Asts: Aghnanian 3

Koramangala Indoor Stadium, Bangalore
Referees: Damian James Lyons (AUS), Park Kyoung-Jin (KOR), Wong Sing Hui (MAS)

=== Knockout round ===
==== Bracket ====
Qualification to Semifinals
1 November
Hong Kong	67
Singapore	37
1 November
Iran	56
Kazakhstan	71

Semifinals
2 November
India	83
Hong Kong	38
2 November
Syria	56
Kazakhstan	76

Finals
3 November
India	68
Kazakhstan	45
Third Place
3 November
Hong Kong	68
Syria	75

==== Seventh place game ====
1 November 2018
13:00

Boxscore

Guam	48–62	Samoa
Scoring by quarter: 14–6, 15–21, 7–23, 12–12
Pts: San Nicolas 24; Rebs: San Nicolas 21; Asts: Perez 6		Pts: Niu 19; Rebs: Harder 14; Asts: T. Taufua 6

Koramangala Indoor Stadium, Bangalore
Referees: Damian James Lyons (AUS), Lee Kyoung-Hwan (KOR), Chiang Meng-chen (TPE)

==== Qualification to Semifinals ====
1 November 2018
15:30

Boxscore

Iran	56–71	Kazakhstan
Scoring by quarter: 17–20, 5–16, 10–14, 24–21
Pts: Goodarzi 11; Rebs: Ghaffari 10; Asts: Goodarzi 7		Pts: Kulikova 26; Rebs: Zaitseva 20; Asts: Motovilova 4

Koramangala Indoor Stadium, Bangalore
Referees: Martin Davison (NZL), Ryoko Odanaka (JPN), Hu Jing (CHN)

1 November 2018
17:45

Boxscore

Hong Kong	67–37	Singapore
Scoring by quarter: 14–6, 15–9, 21–7, 17–15
Pts: Poon W.N. 18; Rebs: TF Ma T.F. 9 Asts: Ho P.Y. 7		Pts: Lee 10; Rebs: Lim 12; Asts: Wong 4

Koramangala Indoor Stadium, Bangalore
Referees: Harja Jaladri (INA), Park Kyoung-Jin (KOR), Shigeyuki Arisawa (JPN)

==== Fifth place game ====
2 November 2018
15:30

Boxscore

Iran	63–51	Singapore
Scoring by quarter: 13–18, 14–16, 17–10, 19–7
Pts: Aghazadegan Ghazvini 29; Rebs: Ghaffari, Rasoulipour Khameneh 11; Asts: Goodarzi 5		Pts: Lim 14; Rebs: Tan K.Y. 9 Asts: 4 players 3

Koramangala Indoor Stadium, Bangalore
Referees: Park Kyoung-Jin (KOR), Chiang Meng-chen (TPE), Amarjot Singh Mavi (IND)

==== Semifinals ====
2 November 2018
17:45

Boxscore

Syria	56–76	Kazakhstan
Scoring by quarter: 18–17, 16–20, 6–18, 16–21
Pts: Bshara 23; Rebs: Bshara 19; Asts: Alhaj Ali 3		Pts: Kulikova 19; Rebs: Bushmeleva 18; Asts: Kulikova 8

Koramangala Indoor Stadium, Bangalore
Referees: Harja Jaladri (INA), Lee Kyoung-Hwan (KOR), Fang Wenxuan (CHN)

2 November 2018
20:00

Boxscore

India	83–38	Hong Kong
Scoring by quarter: 23–8, 28–13, 17–2, 15–15
Pts: Kelttira 18; Rebs: Kelttira 16; Asts: Janardhanan 7		Pts: Poon W.N. 11; Rebs: Ho P.Y. 7 Asts: So N.M. 3

Kanteerava Indoor Stadium, Bangalore
Referees: Martin Davison (NZL), Damian James Lyons (AUS), Ryoko Odanaka (JPN)

==== Third place game ====
3 November 2018
15:00

Boxscore

Hong Kong	68–75	Syria
Scoring by quarter: 15–16, 18–18, 16–20, 19–21
Pts: Poon W.N. 22; Rebs: Lue S.T. 5 Asts: 6 players 2		Pts: Bshara 29; Rebs: Bshara 12; Asts: Alhaj Ali, Aghnanian 5

Koramangala Indoor Stadium, Bangalore
Referees: Park Kyoung-Jin (KOR), Fang Wenxuan (CHN), Imran Ali Baig (IND)

==== Final ====
3 November 2018
16:45

Boxscore

India	68–45	Kazakhstan
Scoring by quarter: 16–9, 16–7, 22–12, 14–17
Pts: Kelttira 20; Rebs: Kelttira 13; Asts: Janardhanan 9		Pts: Kulikova 10; Rebs: Zaitseva 11; Asts: 4 players 1

Kanteerava Indoor Stadium, Bangalore
Referees: Martin Davison (NZL), Hu Jing (CHN), Lee Kyoung-Hwan (KOR)

== Final standings ==
Qualified for the 2019 FIBA U19 Women's Basketball World Cup
Relegated to Division B of the 2022 FIBA U18 Women's Asian Championship

Rank	Team	Record
1st place, gold medalist(s)	China	5–1
2nd place, silver medalist(s)	Japan	4–1
3rd place, bronze medalist(s)	Australia	4–2
4	South Korea	3–2
5	New Zealand	2–3
6	Chinese Taipei	1–4
7	Indonesia	1–3
8	Malaysia	0–4

Promoted to Division A of the 2022 FIBA U18 Women's Asian Championship

Rank	Team	Record
1	India	5–0
2	Kazakhstan	3–3
3	Syria	4–1
4	Hong Kong	3–3
5	Iran	3–2
6	Singapore	1–4
7	Samoa	1–3
8	Guam	0–4
