= 2019 FIBA Under-19 Women's Basketball World Cup =

Basketball tournament in Bangkok, Thailand

Tournament details
- Host country: Thailand
- City: Bangkok
- Dates: 20–28 July
- Teams: 16 (from 5 confederations)
- Venue: 1 (in 1 host city)

Final positions
- Champions: United States (8th title)

Tournament statistics
- MVP: (United States) Paige Bueckers
- Top scorer: (South Korea) Park (16.4)
- Top rebounds: (Mali) Koné (13.9)
- Top assists: (United States) Bueckers (5.4)
- PPG (Team): United States (80.5)
- RPG (Team): Australia (56.1)
- APG (Team): China (19.0)

Official website
- www.fiba.basketball

The 2019 FIBA Under-19 Women's Basketball World Cup (Thai: บาสเกตบอลหญิงชิงแชมป์โลกรุ่นอายุไม่เกิน 19 ปี 2019) (formerly FIBA U19 Women's World Championship) was a tournament organised by FIBA for women's youth national teams aged 19 years old and below and took place in Bangkok, Thailand from 20 to 28 July 2019. Colombia, Germany and Mozambique made their U-19 Women's Basketball World Cup debut.

The United States won their eighth title after defeating Australia in the final in the overtime.

== Venue ==
Bangkok	2019 FIBA Under-19 Women's Basketball World Cup is located in Thailand
Thai-Japanese Arena	2019 FIBA Under-19 Women's Basketball World Cup is located in Thailand
Capacity: 6,600	2019 FIBA Under-19 Women's Basketball World Cup is located in Thailand

== Qualified teams ==
Means of Qualification	Dates	Venue	Berths	Qualifiers
Host Nation	—N/a		1	Thailand
2018 FIBA Under-18 Women's Americas Championship	1–7 August 2018	Mexico City	4	United States; Canada; Argentina; Colombia
2018 FIBA Under-18 Women's European Championship	4–12 August 2018	(Italy) Udine	5	Germany; Spain; Hungary; Latvia; Belgium
2018 FIBA Under-18 Women's African Championship	10–19 August 2018	(Mozambique) Maputo	2	Mali; Mozambique
2018 FIBA Under-18 Women's Asian Championship	28 October–3 November 2018	(India) Bangalore	4	China; Japan; Australia; South Korea
Total			16	

== Draw ==
The draw for the tournament was held on 20 March 2019 in Bangkok, Thailand.

=== Seedings ===
The seedings were announced on 19 March 2019.

Pot 1	Pot 2	Pot 3	Pot 4
Thailand (hosts); United States; China; Germany	Spain; Hungary; Latvia; Belgium	Japan; Australia; Canada; Argentina	Colombia; South Korea; Mali; Mozambique

The following restrictions apply:

- One group will have two European teams, while another will have two Asian teams;
- Japan and Australia drawn in the groups with the USA and Germany;
- Colombia not drawn in the same group as the USA, Argentina and Canada.

== Preliminary round ==
All times are local (UTC+7).

=== Group A ===
Pos	Team	Pld	W	L	PF	PA	PD	Pts
1	Latvia	3	3	0	207	165	+42	6
2	Canada	3	2	1	189	173	+16	5
3	Mozambique	3	1	2	179	167	+12	4
4	Thailand (H)	3	0	3	145	215	−70	3

Source: FIBA
Rules for classification: 1) Points; 2) Head-to-head results; 3) Points difference; 4) Points scored.
(H) Hosts

20 July 2019
12:00

Boxscore

Latvia	65–54	Canada
Scoring by quarter: 15–11, 16–16, 17–11, 17–16
Pts: Mote 13; Rebs: Meldere 11; Asts: Kļeščova 5		Pts: Edwards 15; Rebs: Edwards 9 Asts: three players 2

Bangkok Thai-Japan Youth Arena I, Bangkok
Referees: Alexis Mercado (PUR), Andrada Csender (ROU), Beniamino Attard (ITA)

20 July 2019
15:00

Boxscore

Mozambique	66–39	Thailand
Scoring by quarter: 22–13, 16–9, 18–6, 10–11
Pts: Joaquim, Pinto 16; Rebs: Joaquim, Pinto 9 Asts: Gomes, Pinto 4		Pts: Phuekraksa 12; Rebs: Dangdee 7 Asts: Charoenpanit, Sirisathaphornsap 3

Bangkok Thai-Japan Youth Arena I, Bangkok
Referees: Zdenko Tomašovič (SVK), Jun Horiuchi (JPN), Martin Vulić (CRO)

21 July 2019
14:15

Boxscore

Thailand	57–74	Latvia
Scoring by quarter: 13–20, 19–12, 11–20, 14–22
Pts: Sriharaksa 19; Rebs: Dangdee 12; Asts: four players 2		Pts: Meldere 25; Rebs: Meldere 9 Asts: Ozola 5

Bangkok Thai-Japan Youth Arena I, Bangkok
Referees: Zdenko Tomašovič (SVK), Mohammad Taha (JOR), Sarah Carey (AUS)

21 July 2019
14:30

Boxscore

Canada	60–59	Mozambique
Scoring by quarter: 20–9, 17–15, 19–19, 4–16
Pts: Hanson 19; Rebs: Edwards 9 Asts: King 4		Pts: Pinto 23; Rebs: Pinto 11; Asts: Cipriano, Pinto 3

Bangkok Thai-Japan Youth Arena II, Bangkok
Referees: Gina Cross (USA), Andrada Csender (ROU), Mbaye Seye (SEN)

23 July 2019
14:15

Boxscore

Canada	75–49	Thailand
Scoring by quarter: 17–13, 12–16, 19–7, 27–13
Pts: Edwards 14; Rebs: Masikewich 12; Asts: King 4		Pts: Sriharaksa 11; Rebs: Sirisathaphornsap 6 Asts: three players 2

Bangkok Thai-Japan Youth Arena I, Bangkok
Referees: Radomir Vojinović (MNE), Andrei Sharapa (BLR), Monicca Nassuuna (UGA)

23 July 2019
14:15

Boxscore

Mozambique	54–68	Latvia
Scoring by quarter: 21–15, 13–17, 12–16, 8–20
Pts: Pinto 10; Rebs: Joaquim, Pinto 12; Asts: five players 1		Pts: Meldere 21; Rebs: Meldere 17; Asts: Mote 4

Bangkok Thai-Japan Youth Arena II, Bangkok
Referees: Alexis Mercado (PUR), Jun Horiuchi (JPN), Sarah Carey (AUS)

=== Group B ===
Pos	Team	Pld	W	L	PF	PA	PD	Pts
1	Belgium	3	3	0	202	135	+67	6
2	China	3	2	1	198	175	+23	5
3	Argentina	3	1	2	147	195	−48	4
4	Mali	3	0	3	154	196	−42	3

Source: FIBA
Rules for classification: 1) Points; 2) Head-to-head results; 3) Points difference; 4) Points scored.

20 July 2019
17:15

Boxscore

Mali	52–55	Argentina
Scoring by quarter: 17–8, 12–10, 11–21, 12–16
Pts: S. Koné 12; Rebs: S. Koné 11; Asts: F. Koné 5		Pts: Chagas 17; Rebs: Castro 9 Asts: Suárez 4

Bangkok Thai-Japan Youth Arena I, Bangkok
Referees: Kerem Baki (TUR), Kristaps Konstantinovs (LAT), Song Houlu (CHN)

20 July 2019
19:30

Boxscore

Belgium	64–52	China
Scoring by quarter: 5–9, 20–14, 24–17, 15–12
Pts: Massey 17; Rebs: Massey 13; Asts: Hambursin, Lisowa 3		Pts: Li Yua. 19; Rebs: Chen 10; Asts: six players 1

Bangkok Thai-Japan Youth Arena I, Bangkok
Referees: Gina Cross (USA), Mehmet Karabilecen (TUR), Preeda Muongmee (THA)

21 July 2019
16:45

Boxscore

China	72–62	Mali
Scoring by quarter: 24–13, 13–15, 15–20, 20–14
Pts: Zheng 17; Rebs: Luo 10; Asts: Chen 7		Pts: Dembélé 18; Rebs: S. Koné 13; Asts: F. Koné 4

Bangkok Thai-Japan Youth Arena II, Bangkok
Referees: Grant Todey (USA), Radomir Vojinović (MNE), Viola Györgyi (NOR)

21 July 2019
19:00

Boxscore

Argentina	43–69	Belgium
Scoring by quarter: 6–24, 12–9, 14–24, 11–12
Pts: Castro 10; Rebs: Castro 6 Asts: Fontana, Suárez 1		Pts: Vervaet 19; Rebs: Bi. Massey 23; Asts: Leblon 4

Bangkok Thai-Japan Youth Arena II, Bangkok
Referees: Vasiliki Tsaroucha (GRE), Felipe Ibarra (CHI), Martin Vulić (CRO)

23 July 2019
16:30

Boxscore

China	74–49	Argentina
Scoring by quarter: 15–9, 19–13, 25–16, 15–11
Pts: Chen 19; Rebs: Wan 9 Asts: Wan 6		Pts: Suárez 11; Rebs: Gauna, Gentinetta 4 Asts: Chagas, Suárez 4

Bangkok Thai-Japan Youth Arena I, Bangkok
Referees: Mehmet Karabilecen (TUR), Viola Györgyi (NOR), Steve Bittner (GER)

23 July 2019
16:30

Boxscore

Mali	40–69	Belgium
Scoring by quarter: 15–19, 6–20, 7–13, 12–17
Pts: Traoré 10; Rebs: Dembele, S. Koné 7 Asts: Coulibaly, F. Koné 1		Pts: Bi. Massey 18; Rebs: Bi. Massey 11; Asts: Leblon 5

Bangkok Thai-Japan Youth Arena II, Bangkok
Referees: Gina Cross (USA), Grant Todey (USA), Ryan Jones (NZL)

=== Group C ===
Pos	Team	Pld	W	L	PF	PA	PD	Pts
1	United States	3	3	0	263	173	+90	6
2	Australia	3	2	1	215	209	+6	5
3	Hungary	3	1	2	213	244	−31	4
4	South Korea	3	0	3	194	259	−65	3

Source: FIBA
Rules for classification: 1) Points; 2) Head-to-head results; 3) Points difference; 4) Points scored.

20 July 2019
12:15

Boxscore

United States	79–56	Australia
Scoring by quarter: 19–14, 20–21, 21–4, 19–17
Pts: Bueckers 11; Rebs: Hillmon-Baker 9 Asts: Bueckers 6		Pts: Scanlon 12; Rebs: Fowler 10; Asts: Simons 3

Bangkok Thai-Japan Youth Arena II, Bangkok
Referees: Vasiliki Tsaroucha (GRE), Andrei Sharapa (BLR), Steve Bittner (GER)

20 July 2019
14:30

Boxscore

Hungary	92–68	South Korea
Scoring by quarter: 23–16, 20–15, 23–20, 26–17
Pts: Wentzel 17; Rebs: Mányoki 11; Asts: Boros 4		Pts: Lee So-h. 16; Rebs: Lee H. 9 Asts: Park J. 5

Bangkok Thai-Japan Youth Arena II, Bangkok
Referees: Maripier Malo (CAN), Saber Rezgui (TUN), Ryan Jones (NZL)

21 July 2019
12:00

Boxscore

South Korea	67–89	United States
Scoring by quarter: 14–25, 17–25, 15–18, 21–21
Pts: Park J. 26; Rebs: Park J. 7 Asts: Heo 6		Pts: Belibi 18; Rebs: Egbo 11; Asts: Bueckers 7

Bangkok Thai-Japan Youth Arena I, Bangkok
Referees: Kerem Baki (TUR), Zhang Zhiwei (CHN), Monicca Nassuuna (UGA)

21 July 2019
12:15

Boxscore

Australia	81–71	Hungary
Scoring by quarter: 17–18, 27–15, 12–17, 25–21
Pts: Fowler 19; Rebs: Fowler 17; Asts: Shelley 5		Pts: Angyal 15; Rebs: Mányoky, Kiss 6 Asts: Wentzel 3

Bangkok Thai-Japan Youth Arena II, Bangkok
Referees: Mehmet Karabilecen (TUR), Steve Bittner (GER), Virginia Peruchini (ARG)

23 July 2019
12:00

Boxscore

United States	95–50	Hungary
Scoring by quarter: 33–16, 24–4, 22–19, 16–11
Pts: Howard 18; Rebs: Belibi 11; Asts: Bueckers 6		Pts: Angyal 14; Rebs: Kiss 4 Asts: Angyal, Mányoky 3

Bangkok Thai-Japan Youth Arena I, Bangkok
Referees: Zdenko Tomašovič (SVK), Saber Rezgui (TUN), Zhang Zhiwei (CHN)

23 July 2019
12:00

Boxscore

South Korea	59–78	Australia
Scoring by quarter: 15–22, 15–7, 15–23, 14–26
Pts: Park J. 22; Rebs: Heo, Lee H. 5 Asts: Park J. 4		Pts: Fowler 15; Rebs: Shelley 12; Asts: Shelley 6

Bangkok Thai-Japan Youth Arena II, Bangkok
Referees: Kerem Baki (TUR), Felipe Ibarra (CHI), Song Houlu (CHN)

=== Group D ===
Pos	Team	Pld	W	L	PF	PA	PD	Pts
1	Spain	3	3	0	210	152	+58	6
2	Japan	3	2	1	208	204	+4	5
3	Colombia	3	1	2	163	204	−41	4
4	Germany	3	0	3	176	197	−21	3

Source: FIBA
Rules for classification: 1) Points; 2) Head-to-head results; 3) Points difference; 4) Points scored.

20 July 2019
16:45

Boxscore

Colombia	38–75	Spain
Scoring by quarter: 5–20, 7–18, 11–18, 13–19
Pts: Álvarez 12; Rebs: Pineda 8 Asts: Cortes 3		Pts: Castedo 13; Rebs: Pendande, Pueyo 7 Asts: four players 2

Bangkok Thai-Japan Youth Arena II, Bangkok
Referees: Radomir Vojinović (MNE), Viola Györgyi (NOR), Virginia Peruchini (ARG)

20 July 2019
19:00

Boxscore

Japan	74–67	Germany
Scoring by quarter: 22–22, 19–15, 16–17, 17–13
Pts: Ishihara 16; Rebs: McArthur 8 Asts: Ishihara 4		Pts: Bessoir, Geiselsöder 17; Rebs: Bessoir, Fiebich 9 Asts: Fiebich 4

Bangkok Thai-Japan Youth Arena II, Bangkok
Referees: Grant Toder (USA), Felipe Ibarra (CHI), Mbaye Seye (SEN)

21 July 2019
16:30

Boxscore

Spain	79–65	Japan
Scoring by quarter: 21–15, 17–17, 24–10, 17–23
Pts: Pueyo 21; Rebs: Pendande 12; Asts: Blanco, Piera 4		Pts: Ohhara 14; Rebs: Todo 9 Asts: Ishihara 5

Bangkok Thai-Japan Youth Arena I, Bangkok
Referees: Maripier Malo (CAN), Andrei Sharapa (BLR), Saber Rezgui (TUN)

21 July 2019
18:45

Boxscore

Germany	60–67	Colombia
Scoring by quarter: 20–18, 15–21, 11–14, 14–14
Pts: Geiselsöder 21; Rebs: Fiebich 10; Asts: Fiebich 5		Pts: Caicedo 19; Rebs: Pineda 8 Asts: Caicedo 4

Bangkok Thai-Japan Youth Arena I, Bangkok
Referees: Alexis Mercado (PUR), Ryan Jones (NZL), Preeda Muongmee (THA)

23 July 2019
18:45

Boxscore

Colombia	58–69	Japan
Scoring by quarter: 20–13, 13–16, 12–16, 13–24
Pts: Paz 27; Rebs: Paz 10; Asts: Caicedo 3		Pts: Takehara 14; Rebs: Takehara 6 Asts: Ikeda 5

Bangkok Thai-Japan Youth Arena I, Bangkok
Referees: Maripier Malo (CAN), Virginia Peruchini (ARG), Mohammad Taha (JOR)

23 July 2019
18:45

Boxscore

Germany	49–56	Spain
Scoring by quarter: 13–15, 9–9, 15–16, 12–16
Pts: Mayer 13; Rebs: Bessoir 11; Asts: Mayer 3		Pts: Wone 14; Rebs: Pendande 7 Asts: Wone 4

Bangkok Thai-Japan Youth Arena II, Bangkok
Referees: Vasiliki Tsaroucha (GRE), Kristaps Konstantinovs (LAT), Beniamino Attard (ITA)

== Knockout stage ==
=== Bracket ===
Round of 16
24 July
Latvia	34
Mali	67
24 July
Australia	62
Colombia	53
24 July
Mozambique	28
China	71
24 July
South Korea	51
Spain	60
24 July
Canada	82
Argentina	50
24 July
United States	79
Germany	61
24 July
Thailand	47
Belgium	88
24 July
Hungary	68
Japan	76

Quarter-finals
26 July
Mali	51
Australia	63
26 July
China	52
Spain	55
26 July
Canada	46
United States	81
26 July
Belgium	63
Japan	43

Semi-finals
27 July
Australia	64
Spain	55
27 July
United States	67
Belgium	59

Final
28 July
Australia	70
United States (OT)	74
Third place
28 July
Spain	58
Belgium	52

5–8th place bracket

5–8th place semifinals
27 July
Mali	54
China	67
27 July
Canada	62
Japan	59

Fifth place
28 July
China	72
Canada	64
Seventh place
28 July
Mali	65
Japan	62

9–16th place bracket

9–16th place quarterfinals
26 July
Latvia	46
Colombia	49
26 July
Mozambique	50
South Korea	63
26 July
Argentina	64
Germany	61
26 July
Thailand	58
Hungary	85

9–12th place semifinals
27 July
Colombia	49
South Korea	51
27 July
Argentina	61
Hungary	66

Ninth place
28 July
South Korea	73
Hungary	66
Eleventh place
28 July
Colombia	58
Argentina	51

13–16th place bracket

13–16th place semifinals
27 July
Latvia	63
Mozambique	49
27 July
Germany	86
Thailand	49

13th place
28 July
Latvia	55
Germany	71
15th place
28 July
Mozambique	68
Thailand	38

=== Round of 16 ===
24 July 2019
12:00

Boxscore

Latvia	34–67	Mali
Scoring by quarter: 7–23, 13–13, 6–17, 8–14
Pts: Mote 7 Rebs: Mote 11; Asts: four players 2		Pts: S. Koné 19; Rebs: S. Koné 22; Asts: F. Koné 11

Bangkok Thai-Japan Youth Arena I, Bangkok
Referees: Mehmet Karabilecen (TUR), Felipe Ibarra (CHI), Saber Rezgui (TUN)

24 July 2019
12:15

Boxscore

Canada	82–50	Argentina
Scoring by quarter: 17–17, 22–7, 23–9, 20–17
Pts: King 19; Rebs: Edwards 11; Asts: Hanson 5		Pts: Chagas 20; Rebs: Castro 6 Asts: Suárez, Wolf 2

Bangkok Thai-Japan Youth Arena II, Bangkok
Referees: Vasiliki Tsaroucha (GRE), Alexis Mercado (PUR), Andrada Csender (ROU)

24 July 2019
14:15

Boxscore

Australia	62–53	Colombia
Scoring by quarter: 22–8, 18–14, 15–24, 7–7
Pts: Bourne 11; Rebs: Emma-Nnopu 12; Asts: Scanlon 3		Pts: Caicedo 17; Rebs: Paz 9 Asts: Álvarez 4

Bangkok Thai-Japan Youth Arena I, Bangkok
Referees: Zdenko Tomašovič (SVK), Viola Györgyi (NOR), Steve Bittner (GER)

24 July 2019
14:30

Boxscore

United States	79–61	Germany
Scoring by quarter: 15–17, 25–16, 23–14, 16–14
Pts: Bueckers, Taylor 13; Rebs: Hillmon-Baker 10; Asts: Bueckers 5		Pts: Schiffer 17; Rebs: Fiebich 8 Asts: Förner 4

Bangkok Thai-Japan Youth Arena II, Bangkok
Referees: Kerem Baki (TUR), Ryan Jones (NZL), Preeda Muongmee (THA)

24 July 2019
16:30

Boxscore

Thailand	47–88	Belgium
Scoring by quarter: 8–23, 7–20, 9–21, 23–24
Pts: Laosa 11; Rebs: Boonjun 5 Asts: Charoenpanit, Phuekraksa 2		Pts: Bi. Massey 17; Rebs: Bi. Massey 12; Asts: Leblon 8

Bangkok Thai-Japan Youth Arena I, Bangkok
Referees: Maripier Malo (CAN), Zhang Zhiwei (CHN), Mbaye Seye (SEN)

24 July 2019
16:45

Boxscore

Hungary	68–76	Japan
Scoring by quarter: 15–19, 10–18, 22–20, 21–19
Pts: Dombai, Mányoky 13; Rebs: Mányoky 9 Asts: Dombai 5		Pts: Todo 21; Rebs: Ohhara, Todo 5 Asts: Ishimaki 3

Bangkok Thai-Japan Youth Arena II, Bangkok
Referees: Grant Todey (USA), Kristaps Konstantinovs (LAT), Monicca Nassuuna (UGA)

24 July 2019
18:45

Boxscore

Mozambique	28–71	China
Scoring by quarter: 8–20, 10–24, 6–16, 4–11
Pts: Calisto 10; Rebs: three players 5 Asts: Gomes 3		Pts: Wan 20; Rebs: Li Yuy. 10; Asts: Li Yua. 7

Bangkok Thai-Japan Youth Arena I, Bangkok
Referees: Radomir Vojinović (MNE), Virginia Peruchini (ARG), Mohammad Taha (JOR)

24 July 2019
19:00

Boxscore

South Korea	51–60	Spain
Scoring by quarter: 16–18, 9–19, 9–14, 17–9
Pts: Lee H. 14; Rebs: Lee So-h. 8 Asts: Heo 6		Pts: Pendande 13; Rebs: Pendande 8 Asts: Dembélé 5

Bangkok Thai-Japan Youth Arena II, Bangkok
Referees: Gina Cross (USA), Sarah Cares (AUS), Martin Vulić (CRO)

=== 9–16th place quarterfinals ===
26 July 2019
11:00

Boxscore

Latvia	46–49	Colombia
Scoring by quarter: 11–7, 17–11, 6–16, 12–15
Pts: Meldere 16; Rebs: Meldere 15; Asts: Meldere 4		Pts: Paz 17; Rebs: Paz 11; Asts: Álvarez, González 3

Bangkok Thai-Japan Youth Arena II, Bangkok
Referees: Mehmet Karabilecen (TUR), Beniamino Attard (ITA), Sarah Carey (AUS)

26 July 2019
13:15

Boxscore

Mozambique	50–63	South Korea
Scoring by quarter: 12–20, 6–20, 19–10, 13–13
Pts: Sumbane 24; Rebs: Sumbane 15; Asts: Pinto 4		Pts: Lee So-h. 20; Rebs: Park J. 8 Asts: Park J. 5

Bangkok Thai-Japan Youth Arena II, Bangkok
Referees: Kerem Baki (TUR), Andrei Sharapa (BLR), Ryan Jones (NZL)

26 July 2019
15:30

Boxscore

Thailand	58–85	Hungary
Scoring by quarter: 18–18, 15–17, 12–30, 13–20
Pts: Sriharaksa 18; Rebs: Boonjun 6 Asts: Ploywaenrattana, Phuekraksa 2		Pts: Budácsik 18; Rebs: Kéita 8 Asts: Angyal 6

Bangkok Thai-Japan Youth Arena II, Bangkok
Referees: Alexis Mercado (PUR), Saber Rezgui (TUN), Song Houlu (CHN)

26 July 2019
17:45

Boxscore

Argentina	64–61	Germany
Scoring by quarter: 16–14, 22–13, 9–15, 17–19
Pts: Chagas 26; Rebs: Chagas 7 Asts: Suárez 6		Pts: Geiselsöder 19; Rebs: Geiselsöder 11; Asts: Schiffer 7

Bangkok Thai-Japan Youth Arena II, Bangkok
Referees: Radomir Vojinović (MNE), Maripier Malo (CAN), Jun Horiuchi (JPN)

=== Quarterfinals ===
26 July 2019
12:00

Boxscore

Mali	51–63	Australia
Scoring by quarter: 12–15, 13–13, 11–15, 15–20
Pts: A. Sissoko 14; Rebs: S. Koné 15; Asts: F. Koné, Sangare 3		Pts: Potter 18; Rebs: Emma-Nnopu 10; Asts: Scanlon 4

Bangkok Thai-Japan Youth Arena I, Bangkok
Referees: Grant Todey (USA), Andrada Csender (ROU), Martin Vulić (CRO)

26 July 2019
14:30

Boxscore

Canada	46–81	United States
Scoring by quarter: 9–26, 7–24, 14–11, 16–20
Pts: Edwards, Morra 8 Rebs: Masikewich 7 Asts: King 3		Pts: Howard 14; Rebs: Egbo 10; Asts: Taylor, Van Lith 3

Bangkok Thai-Japan Youth Arena I, Bangkok
Referees: Zdenko Tomašovič (SVK), Virginia Peruchini (ARG), Mohammad Taha (JOR)

26 July 2019
17:00

Boxscore

China	52–55	Spain
Scoring by quarter: 7–13, 16–20, 18–12, 11–10
Pts: Chen 17; Rebs: Li Yua. 8 Asts: Zheng, Li Yua. 4		Pts: Wone 14; Rebs: Pendande 11; Asts: Pueyo 4

Bangkok Thai-Japan Youth Arena I, Bangkok
Referees: Gina Cross (USA), Viola Györgyi (NOR), Kristaps Konstantinovs (LAT)

26 July 2019
19:30

Boxscore

Belgium	63–43	Japan
Scoring by quarter: 17–15, 12–7, 13–7, 21–14
Pts: Lisowa 19; Rebs: Bi. Massey 13; Asts: Leblon 4		Pts: Konno 11; Rebs: Konno 5 Asts: three players 2

Bangkok Thai-Japan Youth Arena I, Bangkok
Referees: Vasiliki Tsaroucha (GRE), Felipe Ibarra (CHI), Steve Bittner (GER)

=== 13–16th place semifinals ===
27 July 2019
11:00

Boxscore

Latvia	63–49	Mozambique
Scoring by quarter: 13–11, 19–17, 20–7, 11–14
Pts: Meldere 19; Rebs: Meldere 13; Asts: Ozola 5		Pts: Pinto 23; Rebs: Sumbane 14; Asts: Paxixe 3

Bangkok Thai-Japan Youth Arena II, Bangkok
Referees: Gina Cross (USA), Jun Horiuchi (JPN), Song Houlu (CHN)

27 July 2019
13:15

Boxscore

Germany	86–49	Thailand
Scoring by quarter: 16–21, 29–6, 32–11, 9–11
Pts: Gaba 19; Rebs: Bessoir 13; Asts: Mayer, Rosemeyer 4		Pts: Phuekraksa 10; Rebs: Phuekraksa 5 Asts: Phetnin 4

Bangkok Thai-Japan Youth Arena II, Bangkok
Referees: Kerem Baki (TUR), Mohammad Taha (JOR), Zhang Zhiwei (CHN)

=== 9–12th place semifinals ===
27 July 2019
15:30

Boxscore

Colombia	49–51	South Korea
Scoring by quarter: 14–13, 15–12, 12–12, 8–14
Pts: Álvarez 14; Rebs: González 11; Asts: Álvarez 4		Pts: Park J. 19; Rebs: Park J. 11; Asts: Heo 5

Bangkok Thai-Japan Youth Arena II, Bangkok
Referees: Felipe Ibarra (CHI), Beniamino Attard (ITA), Saber Rezgui (TUN)

27 July 2019
17:45

Boxscore

Argentina	61–66	Hungary
Scoring by quarter: 11–19, 14–14, 14–12, 22–21
Pts: Chagas 22; Rebs: Castro 11; Asts: Suárez 5		Pts: Dombai 13; Rebs: Kiss, Varga 7 Asts: three players 4

Bangkok Thai-Japan Youth Arena II, Bangkok
Referees: Viola Györgyi (NOR), Kristaps Konstantinovs (LAT), Mbaye Seye (SEN)

=== 5–8th place semifinals ===
27 July 2019
12:00

Boxscore

Mali	54–67	China
Scoring by quarter: 3–17, 20–15, 20–18, 11–17
Pts: S. Koné 20; Rebs: S. Koné 11; Asts: F. Koné, Dembélé 4		Pts: Chen 16; Rebs: Chen 12; Asts: Zheng 7

Bangkok Thai-Japan Youth Arena I, Bangkok
Referees: Vasiliki Tsaroucha (GRE), Steve Bittner (GER), Preeda Muongmee (THA)

27 July 2019
14:30

Boxscore

Canada	62–59	Japan
Scoring by quarter: 13–16, 18–8, 18–21, 13–14
Pts: Edwards, Morra 12; Rebs: Edwards, Masikewich 7 Asts: King 5		Pts: Todo 14; Rebs: Ishimaki 9 Asts: Ishihara 5

Bangkok Thai-Japan Youth Arena I, Bangkok
Referees: Grant Todey (USA), Andrei Sharapa (BLR), Ryan Jones (NZL)

=== Semifinals ===
27 July 2019
17:00

Boxscore

Australia	64–55	Spain
Scoring by quarter: 8–15, 25–10, 15–14, 16–16
Pts: Heal 14; Rebs: Fowler 11; Asts: Shelley 6		Pts: Pendande 11; Rebs: Pendande 7 Asts: Dembélé, Pueyo 4

Bangkok Thai-Japan Youth Arena I, Bangkok
Referees: Zdenko Tomašovič (SVK), Maripier Malo (CAN), Alexis Mercado (PUR)

27 July 2019
19:30

Boxscore

United States	67–59	Belgium
Scoring by quarter: 15–11, 18–15, 16–14, 18–19
Pts: Howard 14; Rebs: Belibi, Boston 7 Asts: Bueckers 7		Pts: Lisowa 21; Rebs: Be. Massey, Bi. Massey 11; Asts: Lisowa 6

Bangkok Thai-Japan Youth Arena I, Bangkok
Referees: Radomir Vojinović (MNE), Virginia Peruchini (ARG), Mehmet Karabilecen (TUR)

=== 15th place game ===
28 July 2019
12:00

Boxscore

Mozambique	68–38	Thailand
Scoring by quarter: 12–12, 14–9, 19–7, 23–10
Pts: Pinto 20; Rebs: Pinto 13; Asts: Calisto 3		Pts: three players 8 Rebs: Sriharaksa 5 Asts: Sirisathaphornsap 4

Bangkok Thai-Japan Youth Arena I, Bangkok
Referees: Virginia Peruchini (ARG), Martin Vulić (CRO), Mbaye Seye (SEN)

=== 13th place game ===
28 July 2019
10:00

Boxscore

Latvia	55–71	Germany
Scoring by quarter: 20–17, 15–23, 11–20, 9–11
Pts: Indrike 10; Rebs: Kļeščova 5 Asts: three players 3		Pts: Geiselsöder 20; Rebs: Bessoir 13; Asts: Förner 7

Bangkok Thai-Japan Youth Arena II, Bangkok
Referees: Felipe Ibarra (CHI), Ryan Jones (NZL), Beniamino Attard (ITA)

=== Eleventh place game ===
28 July 2019
14:30

Boxscore

Colombia	58–51	Argentina
Scoring by quarter: 10–16, 22–9, 16–20, 10–6
Pts: Caicedo 20; Rebs: Paz 10; Asts: Álvarez 6		Pts: Fontana 17; Rebs: Suárez 10; Asts: Suárez 6

Bangkok Thai-Japan Youth Arena II, Bangkok
Referees: Vasiliki Tsaroucha (GRE), Viola Györgyi (NOR), Steve Bittner (GER)

=== Ninth place game ===
28 July 2019
16:45

Boxscore

South Korea	73–66	Hungary
Scoring by quarter: 21–22, 8–13, 19–14, 25–17
Pts: Lee So-h. 21; Rebs: Park J. 10; Asts: Heo Y. 9		Pts: Kiss 15; Rebs: Dombai 8 Asts: Kiss 6

Bangkok Thai-Japan Youth Arena II, Bangkok
Referees: Radomir Vojinović (MNE), Andrada Csender (ROU), Preeda Muongmee (THA)

=== Seventh place game ===
28 July 2019
12:15

Boxscore

Mali	65–62	Japan
Scoring by quarter: 17–24, 15–10, 19–9, 14–19
Pts: S. Koné 26; Rebs: S. Koné 18; Asts: F. Koné 5		Pts: Okuyama, Takehara 16; Rebs: Todo 9 Asts: Todo 5

Bangkok Thai-Japan Youth Arena II, Bangkok
Referees: Kerem Baki (TUR), Sarah Carey (AUS), Zhang Zhiwei (CHN)

=== Fifth place game ===
28 July 2019
14:30

Boxscore

China	72–64	Canada
Scoring by quarter: 18–10, 17–14, 13–18, 24–22
Pts: Li Yua. 23; Rebs: Chen, Wan 13; Asts: Li Yua., Zheng 6		Pts: Hanson 15; Rebs: Masikewich 9 Asts: Edwards 3

Bangkok Thai-Japan Youth Arena I, Bangkok
Referees: Alexis Mercado (PUR), Kristaps Konstantinovs (LAT), Mohammad Taha (JOR)

=== Third place game ===
28 July 2019
17:00

Boxscore

Spain	58–52	Belgium
Scoring by quarter: 15–14, 6–11, 17–10, 20–17
Pts: Pendande 14; Rebs: Wone 8 Asts: three players 4		Pts: Leblon 14; Rebs: Bi. Massey 11; Asts: Leblon 4

Bangkok Thai-Japan Youth Arena I, Bangkok
Referees: Gina Cross (USA), Andrei Sharapa (BLR), Grant Todey (USA)

=== Final ===
28 July 2019
19:30

Boxscore

Australia	70–74 (OT)	United States
Scoring by quarter: 23–22, 17–17, 13–14, 13–13, Overtime: 4–8
Pts: Shelley 18; Rebs: Anstey 12; Asts: four players 3		Pts: Bueckers 17; Rebs: Boston, Hillmon-Baker 11; Asts: Bueckers 5

Bangkok Thai-Japan Youth Arena I, Bangkok
Referees: Zdenko Tomašovič (SVK), Maripier Malo (CAN), Mehmet Karabilecen (TUR)

== Final standings ==
Rank	Team	Record
1st place, gold medalist(s)	United States	7–0
2nd place, silver medalist(s)	Australia	5–2
3rd place, bronze medalist(s)	Spain	6–1
4th	Belgium	5–2
5th	China	5–2
6th	Canada	4–3
7th	Mali	2–5
8th	Japan	3–4
9th	South Korea	3–4
10th	Hungary	3–4
11th	Colombia	3–4
12th	Argentina	2–5
13th	Germany	2–5
14th	Latvia	4–3
15th	Mozambique	2–5
16th	Thailand	0–7

== Statistical leaders ==
Points

Name	PPG
(South Korea) Park Ji-hyun	16.4
(Argentina) Florencia Chagas	16.3
(Mali) Sika Koné	15.1
(Latvia) Laura Meldere	15.0
(Mozambique) Chanaya Pinto	14.9

Rebounds

Name	RPG
(Mali) Sika Koné	13.9
(Belgium) Billie Massey	13.4
(Latvia) Laura Meldere	10.3
(Australia) Alexandra Fowler	10.0
(Germany) Emily Bessoir	9.3
(Mozambique) Chanaya Pinto	9.3

Assists

Name	APG
(United States) Paige Bueckers	5.4
(South Korea) Heo Yee-un	4.9
(Mali) Fanta Koné	4.7
(China) Li Yuan	4.4
(Belgium) Emmeline Leblon	4.1

Blocks

Name	BPG
(Belgium) Billie Massey	2.3
(Latvia) Laura Meldere	1.7
(United States) Aliyah Boston	1.6
(Mali) Sika Koné	1.4
(Colombia) Yuliany Paz	1.4

Steals

Name	SPG
(South Korea) Park Ji-hyun	3.9
(Colombia) Mayra Caicedo	3.4
(Mozambique) Chanaya Pinto	3.1
(South Korea) Lee Hae-ran	3.0
(Argentina) Brenda Fontana	2.9

== Awards ==
Award	Winner	Team
Most Valuable Player	Paige Bueckers	United States
All-Tournament Team	Paige Bueckers	United States
All-Tournament Team	Rhyne Howard	United States
All-Tournament Team	Alexandra Fowler	Australia
All-Tournament Team	Lola Pendande	Spain
All-Tournament Team	Billie Massey	Belgium
