= Sri Lanka women's national under-18 basketball team =

Sri Lanka
- Joined FIBA: 1959
- FIBA zone: FIBA Asia
- National federation: Sri Lanka Basketball Federation

U19 World Cup
- Appearances: None

U18 Asia Cup
- Appearances: 14
- Medals: None

The Sri Lanka women's national under-18 basketball team is a national basketball team of Sri Lanka, administered by the Sri Lanka Basketball Federation. It represents the country in international under-18 women's basketball competitions.

== FIBA Under-18 Women's Asia Cup participations ==
Year	Result
1977	6th
1980	9th
1984	7th
1989	10th
1990	8th
1992	9th
1996	10th

Year	Result
1998	8th
2000	11th
2007	12th
2010	10th
2012	11th
2014	9th
2016	12th

== See also ==
- Sri Lanka women's national basketball team
- Sri Lanka women's national under-16 basketball team
- Sri Lanka men's national under-18 basketball team
