= Hong Kong women's national under-18 basketball team =

Hong Kong
- FIBA zone: FIBA Asia
- National federation: Basketball Association of Hong Kong, China

U19 World Cup
- Appearances: None

U18 Asia Cup
- Appearances: 14
- Medals: None

U18 Asia Cup Division B
- Appearances: 3
- Medals: None

The Hong Kong women's national under-18 basketball team is a national basketball team of Hong Kong, administered by the Basketball Association of Hong Kong, China. It represents the region in international under-18 women's basketball competitions.

== FIBA Under-18 Women's Asia Cup participations ==
Year	Division A
1978	4th
1980	7th
1982	8th
1989	11th
1990	10th
1992	10th
1996	12th
1998	7th
2000	10th

Year	Division A	Division B
2007	10th	
2008	11th	
2012	8th	
2014	8th	
2016	9th	
2018		4th
2022		7th
2024		5th

== See also ==
- Hong Kong women's national basketball team
- Hong Kong women's national under-16 basketball team
- Hong Kong men's national under-18 basketball team
