= India women's national under-18 basketball team =

India
- Joined FIBA: 1936
- FIBA zone: FIBA Asia
- National federation: Basketball Federation of India

U19 World Cup
- Appearances: None

U18 Asia Cup
- Appearances: 16
- Medals: None

U18 Asia Cup Division B
- Appearances: 1
- Medals: (gold) Gold: 1 (2018)

The India women's national under-18 basketball team is a national basketball team of India, administered by the Basketball Federation of India. It represents the country in international under-18 women's basketball competitions.

== Performance record ==
=== FIBA Under-18 Women's Asia Cup ===
Year	Division A
1980	4th
1982	6th
1989	5th
1990	6th
1996	6th
1998	9th
2000	9th
2002	7th
2004	8th

Year	Division A	Division B
2007	7th	—N/a
2008	6th	—N/a
2010	8th	—N/a
2012	7th	—N/a
2014	6th	—N/a
2016	6th	—N/a
2018	—N/a	1st place, gold medalist(s)
2022	8th	—N/a
2026	—N/a	4th

== See also ==
- India women's national basketball team
- India women's national under-16 basketball team
- India men's national under-18 basketball team
