= 2019 FIBA Under-19 Women's Basketball World Cup squads =

This article shows the rosters of all participating teams at the 2019 FIBA Under-19 Women's Basketball World Cup in Thailand.

== Group C ==
=== Australia ===
Australia women's national under-19 basketball team roster
Players
Coaches

Pos.	No.	Name	Age – Date of birth	Height	Club
G	4	Jazmin Shelley	19 – 13 May 2000	1.75 m (5 ft 9 in)	Oregon Ducks	(United States)
G	5	Shyla Heal	17 – 19 September 2001	1.67 m (5 ft 6 in)	Bendigo Spirit	(Australia)
G	6	Chelsea D'Angelo	19 – 18 January 2000	1.70 m (5 ft 7 in)		(Australia)
G	7	Miela Goodchild	19 – 6 April 2000	1.75 m (5 ft 9 in)	Duke Blue Devils	(United States)
G	8	Lily Scanlon	18 – 21 February 2001	1.75 m (5 ft 9 in)		(Australia)
F	9	Agnes Emma-Nnopu	17 – 5 August 2001	1.82 m (6 ft 0 in)		(Australia)
F	10	Gemma Potter	17 – 27 February 2002	1.82 m (6 ft 0 in)		(Australia)
F	11	Samantha Simons	18 – 31 January 2001	1.85 m (6 ft 1 in)		(Australia)
F	12	Isabelle Bourne	18 – 21 November 2000	1.88 m (6 ft 2 in)		(Australia)
F	13	Ula Motuga	19 – 6 April 2000	1.85 m (6 ft 1 in)	Washington State Cougars	(United States)
F	14	Alexandra Fowler	17 – 21 July 2001	1.82 m (6 ft 0 in)		(Australia)
C	15	Isobel Anstey	17 – 27 July 2001	1.91 m (6 ft 3 in)		(Australia)

Head coach

- (Australia) Dee Butler

Assistant coach(es)

- (Australia) David Herbert
- (Australia) Claudia Brassard

Legend

- Club – describes current
  club as of tournament
- Age – describes age
  on 20 July 2019

=== United States ===
United States women's national under-19 basketball team roster
Players
Coaches

Pos.	No.	Name	Age – Date of birth	Height	Club	Ctr.
F	15	Francesca Belibi	18 – 20 July 2001	1.85 m (6 ft 1 in)	Stanford Cardinal	(United States)
F	14	Aliyah Boston	17 – 11 December 2001	1.93 m (6 ft 4 in)	South Carolina Gamecocks	(United States)
F	8	Cameron Brink	17 – 31 December 2001	1.93 m (6 ft 4 in)	Stanford Cardinal	(United States)
G	5	Paige Bueckers	17 – 20 October 2001	1.80 m (5 ft 11 in)	UConn Huskies	(United States)
G	6	Caitlin Clark	17 – 22 January 2002	1.82 m (6 ft 0 in)	Dowling Catholic HS	(United States)
F	10	Queen Egbo	19 – 29 June 2000	1.91 m (6 ft 3 in)	Baylor Lady Bears	(United States)
F	11	Nazahrah Hillmon-Baker	19 – 5 April 2000	1.85 m (6 ft 1 in)	Michigan Wolverines	(United States)
G	13	Rhyne Howard	19 – 29 April 2000	1.88 m (6 ft 2 in)	Kentucky Wildcats	(United States)
G	4	Ashley Joens	19 – 16 March 2000	1.80 m (5 ft 11 in)	Iowa State Cyclones	(United States)
G	12	Diamond Miller	18 – 11 February 2001	1.85 m (6 ft 1 in)	Maryland Terrapins	(United States)
G	7	Celeste Taylor	18 – 20 June 2001	1.80 m (5 ft 11 in)	Texas Longhorns	(United States)
G	9	Hailey Van Lith	17 – 9 September 2001	1.75 m (5 ft 9 in)	Cashmere HS	(United States)

Head coach

- (United States) Jeff Walz

Assistant coach(es)

- (United States) Natasha Adair
- (United States) Cori Close

Legend

- Club – describes current
  club as of tournament
- Age – describes age
  on 20 July 2019
