= 1984 ABC Under-18 Championship for Women =

1984 FIBA U18 Women's Asia Cup
8th FIBA Under-18 Women's Asian Basketball Championship

Tournament details
- Host country: South Korea
- Dates: April 7–19
- Teams: 7
- Venue: 1 (in 1 host city)

Final positions
- Champions: China (3rd title)

The 1984 ABC Under-18 Championship for Women was the eighth edition of the Asian Basketball Confederation (ABC)'s Junior Championship for women. The games were held at Seoul, South Korea from April 7–19, 1984. Taiwan came to Seoul to participate the competition, but withdrew later due to the conflict about using the Chinese flag during the event.

== Venue ==
The games were held at Jamsil Arena, located in Seoul.

== Preliminary round ==
All times are in Korean Standard Time (UTC+09:00)

=== Group A ===
Team	Pld	W	L	PF	PA	PD	Pts
China	3	3	0	326	145	181	6
Japan	3	2	1	291	209	82	5
Philippines	3	1	2	177	259	-82	4
Singapore	3	0	3	106	287	-181	3

7 April 1984
17:30

China	116–41	Philippines
Scoring by half: 54-19, 62-22

Jamsil Arena, Seoul

8 April 1984
11:30

Japan	109–41	Singapore
Scoring by half: 63-19, 46-22

Jamsil Arena, Seoul

9 April 1984
14:30

Philippines	63–103	Japan
Scoring by half: 26-68, 37-35

Jamsil Arena, Seoul

10 April 1984
14:30

Singapore	25–105	China
Scoring by half: 13-58, 12-47

Jamsil Arena, Seoul

11 April 1984
14:30

China	105–79	Japan
Scoring by half: 47-40, 58-39

Jamsil Arena, Seoul

12 April 1984
14:30

Philippines	73–40	Singapore
Scoring by half: 41-26, 32-14

Jamsil Arena, Seoul

=== Group B ===
Team	Pld	W	L	PF	PA	PD	Pts
South Korea	2	2	0	264	67	197	4
Malaysia	2	1	1	96	166	-70	3
Sri Lanka	2	0	2	68	195	-127	2
Taiwan	0	0	0	0	0	0	0

8 April 1984
13:30

South Korea	131–35	Sri Lanka
Scoring by half: 67-18, 64-17

Jamsil Arena, Seoul

8 April 1984
16:00

Malaysia	vs.	Taiwan

Jamsil Arena, Seoul

10 April 1984
13:00

Sri Lanka	vs.	Taiwan

Jamsil Arena, Seoul

10 April 1984
17:30

South Korea	133–32	Malaysia
Scoring by half: 72-16, 61-16

Jamsil Arena, Seoul

11 April 1984
11:30

Malaysia	64–33	Sri Lanka
Scoring by half: 28-19, 36-14

Jamsil Arena, Seoul

11 April 1984
17:30

Taiwan	vs.	South Korea

Jamsil Arena, Seoul

== Classification round ==
Team	Pld	W	L	PF	PA	PD	Pts
Singapore	2	2	0	108	103	5	4
Philippines	2	1	1	11	98	13	3
Sri Lanka	2	0	2	86	104	-18	2

14 April 1984
11:30

Singapore	49–47	Sri Lanka
Scoring by half: 19-12, 30-35

Jamsil Arena, Seoul

16 April 1984
11:30

Sri Lanka	39–55	Philippines
Scoring by half: 19-25, 20-30

Jamsil Arena, Seoul

17 April 1984
14:30

Philippines	56–59	Singapore
Scoring by half: 27-28, 29-31

Jamsil Arena, Seoul

== Final round ==
Team	Pld	W	L	PF	PA	PD	Pts
China	3	3	0	290	180	110	6
South Korea	3	2	1	288	198	90	5
Japan	3	1	2	252	251	1	4
Malaysia	3	0	3	125	326	-201	3

14 April 1984
14:30

China	113–42	Malaysia
Scoring by half: 59-28, 54-14

Jamsil Arena, Seoul

15 April 1984
16:00

South Korea	104–85	Japan
Scoring by half: 54-42, 50-43

Jamsil Arena, Seoul

16 April 1984
13:00

Malaysia	46–100	Japan
Scoring by half: 20-53, 26-47

Jamsil Arena, Seoul

17 April 1984
17:30

Malaysia	37–113	South Korea
Scoring by half: 22-58, 15-55

Jamsil Arena, Seoul

18 April 1984
16:00

South Korea	71–76	China
Scoring by half: 41-45, 30-31

Jamsil Arena, Seoul

19 April 1984
16:00

China	101–67	Japan
Scoring by half: 45-35, 56-32

Jamsil Arena, Seoul

== Final standings ==
Rank	Team	Record
1st place, gold medalist(s)	China	6–0
2nd place, silver medalist(s)	South Korea	4–1
3rd place, bronze medalist(s)	Japan	3–3
4th	Malaysia	1–4
5th	Singapore	2–3
6th	Philippines	2–3
7th	Sri Lanka	0–4

== Awards ==
1984 Asian Under-18 champions

China
Third title

== See also ==
- 1984 ABC Under-18 Championship
