= 2010 FIBA Asia Under-18 Championship for Women =

20th FIBA Under-18 Women's Asian Basketball Championship
- Official logo of the 2010 FIBA Asia Under-18 Championship for Women

Tournament details
- Host country: Thailand
- City: Surat Thani
- Dates: June 23–30
- Teams: 12 (from 1 confederation)
- Venue: 1 (in 1 host city)

Final positions
- Champions: China (12th title)
- Runners-up: Japan
- Third place: Chinese Taipei

Official website
- 2010 FIBA Asia U-18 Championship for Women

FIBA Asia Under-18 Championship for Women 2010 is FIBA Asia's basketball championship for females under 18 years old. The games were held at Surat Thani, Thailand.

The championship is divided into "Level I" and "Level II".

== Participating teams ==
| Level I | Level II |
|---|---|
| Japan; China; South Korea; Chinese Taipei; Malaysia; Kazakhstan | India; Philippines; Thailand; Laos; Sri Lanka; Syria |

== Preliminary round ==
=== Level I ===
| Team | Pld | W | L | PF | PA | PD | Pts |
|---|---|---|---|---|---|---|---|
| Japan | 5 | 5 | 0 | 440 | 302 | +138 | 10 |
| China | 5 | 4 | 1 | 499 | 278 | +221 | 9 |
| Chinese Taipei | 5 | 3 | 2 | 353 | 368 | −15 | 8 |
| South Korea | 5 | 2 | 3 | 360 | 388 | −28 | 7 |
| Malaysia | 5 | 1 | 4 | 282 | 371 | −89 | 6 |
| Kazakhstan | 5 | 0 | 5 | 261 | 488 | −227 | 5 |

June 23
13:00

Report

| Japan | 73–72 | China |
Scoring by quarter: 16–17, 28–22, 13–25, 16–8
| Pts: Watanabe 23; Rebs: Nagaoka 7 Asts: Nagaoka 1 | | Pts: Gao S. 24; Rebs: Sun M.X., Gao S. 9 Asts: Sun M.X. 4 |

Surat Thani Gymnasium, Surat Thani
Referees: Fabiana Nițu (ROU), Glenn Cornelio (PHI), Dumrongkiat Mungmit (THA)

June 23
15:00

Report

| South Korea | 73–59 | Malaysia |
Scoring by quarter: 15–21, 19–11, 19–16, 20–11
| Pts: Lee Je.H. 19; Rebs: Lee S.A. 10; Asts: Lee S.A. 3 | | Pts: Low P.C. 14; Rebs: Saw W.Y. 9 Asts: Saw W.Y. 3 |

Surat Thani Gymnasium, Surat Thani
Referees: Snehal Bendke (IND), Mohammad Nachawati (SYR), Preeda Muongmee (THA)

June 23
20:00

Report

| Chinese Taipei | 81–68 | Kazakhstan |
Scoring by quarter: 18–16, 22–15, 21–21, 20–16
| Pts: Lin Y.T. 29; Rebs: Huang H.T., Lin Y.T. 7 Asts: Wei Y.C. 2 | | Pts: Vinokurova 15; Rebs: Vinokurova 9 Asts: Popova 2 |

Surat Thani Gymnasium, Surat Thani
Referees: Rafael Britanico (PHI), Watcharin Padungratchadakit (THA), Zanim Mohammed Hashim (IND)

June 24
13:00

Report

| Malaysia | 45–71 | Chinese Taipei |
Scoring by quarter: 13–21, 7–20, 15–21, 10–9
| Pts: Saw W.Y. 15; Rebs: Ting 11; Asts: Saw W.Y. 2 | | Pts: Liu J.H. 16; Rebs: Lin Y.T. 12; Asts: Chang C.F. 7 |

Surat Thani Gymnasium, Surat Thani
Referees: Fabiana Nițu (ROU), Rafael Britanico (PHI), Watcharin Padungratchadakit (THA)

June 24
15:00

Report

| Kazakhstan | 52–118 | Japan |
Scoring by quarter: 14–28, 11–34, 11–23, 16–33
| Pts: Vinokurova 27; Rebs: Vinokurova 21; Asts: Fedyanina, Kornilova 1 | | Pts: Motokawa 22; Rebs: Nozoe 9 Asts: Kanehara 3 |

Surat Thani Gymnasium, Surat Thani
Referees: Mohammad Nachawati (SYR), Zanim Mohammed Hashim (IND), Samphan Kamphusiriphan (THA)

June 24
19:00

Report

| China | 100–56 | South Korea |
Scoring by quarter: 22–12, 27–15, 25–15, 26–14
| Pts: Ma X.Y. 16; Rebs: Ma X.Y. 8 Asts: Yang L.W., Jin W.N. 3 | | Pts: Lee Ji.H. 13; Rebs: Lee S.A. 5 Asts: Lee S.A. 2 |

Surat Thani Gymnasium, Surat Thani
Referees: Karolina Andersson (FIN), Dumrongkiat Mungmit (THA), Snehal Bendke (IND)

June 25
13:00

Report

| Chinese Taipei | 84–82 | South Korea |
Scoring by quarter: 30–17, 23–25, 17–12, 14–28
| Pts: Chang C.F. 23; Rebs: Chang C.F. 9 Asts: Chang C.F. 5 | | Pts: Lee Je.H. 27; Rebs: Lee Je.H. 9 Asts: 0 |

Surat Thani Gymnasium, Surat Thani
Referees: Karolina Andersson (FIN), Preeda Muongmee (THA), Mohammad Nachawati (SYR)

June 25
15:00

Report

| Kazakhstan | 31–141 | China |
Scoring by quarter: 13–31, 7–34, 2–42, 9–34
| Pts: Borissova 6 Rebs: Kanaikina 5 Asts: Kornilova 1 | | Pts: Gao S. 35; Rebs: Gao S., Yu D. 11; Asts: Yang L.W. 5 |

Surat Thani Gymnasium, Surat Thani
Referees: Watcharin Padungratchadakit (THA), Snehal Bendke (IND), Rafael Britanico (PHI)

June 25
19:00

Report

| Japan | 98–63 | Malaysia |
Scoring by quarter: 31–20, 27–14, 18–23, 22–6
| Pts: Nagaoka 22; Rebs: Nagaoka 9 Asts: Sezaki 4 | | Pts: Ting 13; Rebs: Ting 8 Asts: Saw W.Y. 3 |

Surat Thani Gymnasium, Surat Thani
Referees: Fabiana Nițu (ROU), Samphan Kamphusiriphan (THA), Glenn Cornelio (PHI)

June 26
13:00

Report

| China | 106–55 | Chinese Taipei |
Scoring by quarter: 26–15, 24–10, 27–14, 29–16
| Pts: Li M. 19; Rebs: Yu D. 9 Asts: Zuo J.Y. 4 | | Pts: Chang C.F. 15; Rebs: Huang H.T. 7 Asts: Liu J.H. 1 |

Surat Thani Gymnasium, Surat Thani
Referees: Karolina Andersson (FIN), Zanim Mohammed Hashim (IND), Samphan Kamphusiriphan (THA)

June 26
15:00

Report

| Malaysia | 52–49 | Kazakhstan |
Scoring by quarter: 21–16, 13–16, 14–5, 4–12
| Pts: Saw W.Y. 15; Rebs: Saw W.Y. 12; Asts: Saw W.Y. 7 | | Pts: Abdreupova 14; Rebs: Vinokurova 12; Asts: Abdreupova 6 |

Surat Thani Gymnasium, Surat Thani
Referees: Dumrongkiat Mungmit (THA), Glenn Cornelio (PHI), Mohammad Nachawati (SYR)

June 26
19:00

Report

| South Korea | 53–84 | Japan |
Scoring by quarter: 11–21, 13–20, 16–22, 13–21
| Pts: Kim G.H., Cha H.J., Lee R. 10; Rebs: Lee R. 9 Asts: Lee Je.H. 1 | | Pts: Katsura 18; Rebs: Chikahira 11; Asts: Katsura 3 |

Surat Thani Gymnasium, Surat Thani
Referees: Fabiana Nițu (ROU), Snehal Bendke (IND), Preeda Muongmee (THA)

June 27
13:00

Report

| Malaysia | 63–80 | China |
Scoring by quarter: 11–29, 16–16, 12–26, 24–9
| Pts: Yap F.Y. 14; Rebs: Leong L.P. 11; Asts: Kung H.L., Chong Y.Y., Yap F.Y. 1 | | Pts: Zuo J.Y. 14; Rebs: Zhang L.T. 6 Asts: Yang L.W. 5 |

Surat Thani Gymnasium, Surat Thani
Referees: Mohammad Nachawati (SYR), Preeda Muongmee (THA), Snehal Bendke (IND)

June 27
15:00

Report

| Kazakhstan | 61–96 | South Korea |
Scoring by quarter: 15–22, 12–17, 15–35, 19–22
| Pts: Vinokurova 21; Rebs: Vinokurova 13; Asts: Borissova 3 | | Pts: Sim S.Y. 14; Rebs: Kim G.H. 5 Asts: Noh H.J. 2 |

Surat Thani Gymnasium, Surat Thani
Referees: Glenn Cornelio (PHI), Zanim Mohammed Hashim (IND), Preeda Muongmee (THA)

June 27
19:00

Report

| Japan | 67–62 | Chinese Taipei |
Scoring by quarter: 20–24, 17–15, 16–16, 14–7
| Pts: Hill 14; Rebs: Nagaoka 15; Asts: Kanehara, Hill 3 | | Pts: Chang C.F. 18; Rebs: Lee C.N. 9 Asts: Four players 1 |

Surat Thani Gymnasium, Surat Thani
Referees: Fabiana Nițu (ROU), Rafael Britanico (PHI), Watcharin Padungratchadakit (THA)

=== Level II ===
| Team | Pld | W | L | PF | PA | PD | Pts |
|---|---|---|---|---|---|---|---|
| Thailand | 5 | 5 | 0 | 433 | 206 | +227 | 10 |
| India | 5 | 4 | 1 | 442 | 246 | +196 | 9 |
| Philippines | 5 | 3 | 2 | 331 | 336 | −5 | 8 |
| Sri Lanka | 5 | 2 | 3 | 286 | 340 | −54 | 7 |
| Syria | 5 | 1 | 4 | 271 | 346 | −75 | 6 |
| Laos | 5 | 0 | 5 | 212 | 501 | −289 | 5 |

June 23
9:00

Report

| India | 86–39 | Sri Lanka |
Scoring by quarter: 34–12, 19–7, 21–14, 14–6
| Pts: Rajguru 14; Rebs: Kindo 9 Asts: Scaria, Kavita 2 | | Pts: Perera 12; Rebs: Perera 9 Asts: 0 |

Surat Thani Gymnasium, Surat Thani
Referees: Tang Jun (CHN), Chan Wai Seong (MAS), Anton Kozlov (KAZ)

June 23
11:00

Report

| Syria | 75–33 | Laos |
Scoring by quarter: 16–2, 19–9, 12–15, 28–7
| Pts: Sarkis 21; Rebs: Hassoun 20; Asts: Sarkis 2 | | Pts: Souksavath 12; Rebs: Souksavath 10; Asts: Chanthaboury 1 |

Surat Thani Gymnasium, Surat Thani
Referees: Ng Cheng Hou (MAS), Lee Ji-Youn (KOR), Chen Ming-ling (TPE)

June 23
18:00

Report

| Thailand | 86–22 | Philippines |
Scoring by quarter: 23–10, 23–7, 21–5, 19–0
| Pts: Buapa 23; Rebs: Nakkhao 11; Asts: Sorot, Buapa, Nakkhao 2 | | Pts: Jose 8 Rebs: Rivera 10; Asts: 0 |

Surat Thani Gymnasium, Surat Thani
Referees: Tang Jun (CHN), Chan Wai Seong (MAS), Anton Kozlov (KAZ)

June 24
9:00

Report

| Philippines | 58–55 | Syria |
Scoring by quarter: 16–17, 14–14, 18–11, 10–13
| Pts: Aseron 15; Rebs: Rivera 19; Asts: Rivera, Nitorreda 1 | | Pts: Sarkis 14; Rebs: Hassoun 13; Asts: Sarkis 4 |

Surat Thani Gymnasium, Surat Thani
Referees: Lee Ji-Youn (KOR), Anton Kozlov (KAZ), Chiang Meng-chen (TPE)

June 24
11:00

Report

| Laos | 45–117 | India |
Scoring by quarter: 11–22, 8–33, 12–24, 14–38
| Pts: Phengsavanh 9 Rebs: Oulavong 6 Asts: K. Nanthalath, Souksavath, Oulavong 1 | | Pts: Kavita 30; Rebs: Priyadharshini 11; Asts: Lutukurthy, Kavita, Radhakrishnan 3 |

Surat Thani Gymnasium, Surat Thani
Referees: Lui Wei (CHN), Hiromi Nakae (JPN), Kim Min-Ji (KOR)

June 24
17:00

Report

| Sri Lanka | 45–77 | Thailand |
Scoring by quarter: 15–17, 7–21, 7–22, 16–17
| Pts: Wijenayake 16; Rebs: Wijenayake 16; Asts: Weeraratne 1 | | Pts: Buapa 25; Rebs: Kaichalyapoom 19; Asts: Sorot 6 |

Surat Thani Gymnasium, Surat Thani
Referees: Tang Jun (CHN), Ng Cheng Hou (MAS), Kenichi Kaba (JPN)

June 25
9:00

Report

| Sri Lanka | 62–76 | Philippines |
Scoring by quarter: 17–19, 17–20, 22–19, 6–18
| Pts: Wijenayake 20; Rebs: Ranhaluge 8 Asts: Weeraratne, Ranhaluge 1 | | Pts: Aseron 23; Rebs: Rivera 10; Asts: Tanaman 2 |

Surat Thani Gymnasium, Surat Thani
Referees: Anton Kozlov (KAZ), Kim Min-Ji (KOR), Lui Wei (CHN)

June 25
11:00

Report

| India | 97–44 | Syria |
Scoring by quarter: 12–12, 31–9, 23–8, 31–15
| Pts: Bhuskute 23; Rebs: Radhakrishnan 10; Asts: Kavita 4 | | Pts: Badran 10; Rebs: Badran 8 Asts: Sarkis 3 |

Surat Thani Gymnasium, Surat Thani
Referees: Chen Ming-ling (TPE), Kenichi Kaba (JPN), Ng Cheng Hou (MAS)

June 25
17:00

Report

| Thailand | 108–37 | Laos |
Scoring by quarter: 31–9, 23–10, 20–9, 34–9
| Pts: Buapa 19; Rebs: Arjsri 10; Asts: Sevetchanan 5 | | Pts: Oulavong 10; Rebs: Oulavong 9 Asts: Oulavong 1 |

Surat Thani Gymnasium, Surat Thani
Referees: Chan Wai Seong (MAS), Chiang Meng-chen (TPE), Hiromi Nakae (JPN)

June 26
9:00

Report

| Philippines | 63–88 | India |
Scoring by quarter: 11–27, 11–20, 19–20, 22–21
| Pts: Nitorreda 14; Rebs: Rivera 10; Asts: Claro 4 | | Pts: Kavita 33; Rebs: Kavita 12; Asts: Kavita 6 |

Surat Thani Gymnasium, Surat Thani
Referees: Hiromi Nakae (JPN), Tang Jun (CHN), Chan Wai Seong (MAS)

June 26
11:00

Report

| Laos | 52–89 | Sri Lanka |
Scoring by quarter: 13–26, 7–29, 17–13, 15–21
| Pts: Oulavong 11; Rebs: Oulavong 15; Asts: Oulavong 2 | | Pts: Perera 23; Rebs: Ranhaluge 16; Asts: Thewahettige 4 |

Surat Thani Gymnasium, Surat Thani
Referees: Kim Min-Ji (KOR), Anton Kozlov (KAZ), Chiang Meng-chen (TPE)

June 26
17:00

Report

| Syria | 48–107 | Thailand |
Scoring by quarter: 14–25, 13–20, 8–40, 13–22
| Pts: Rabahieh, Dahdouh 14; Rebs: Hassoun 10; Asts: Badran, Sarkis 1 | | Pts: Kotchrat 15; Rebs: Kotchrat 12; Asts: Sawatong 5 |

Surat Thani Gymnasium, Surat Thani
Referees: Kenichi Kaba (JPN), Chen Ming-ling (TPE), Lee Ji-Youn (KOR)

June 27
9:00

Report

| Laos | 45–112 | Philippines |
Scoring by quarter: 7–26, 13–25, 13–23, 12–38
| Pts: Souksavath 11; Rebs: Oulavong 12; Asts: Oulavong 3 | | Pts: Rivera 27; Rebs: Rivera 25; Asts: Claro 4 |

Surat Thani Gymnasium, Surat Thani
Referees: Chiang Meng-chen (TPE), Lee Ji-Youn (KOR), Kenichi Kaba (JPN)

June 27
11:00

Report

| Sri Lanka | 51–49 | Syria |
Scoring by quarter: 8–10, 15–11, 17–11, 11–17
| Pts: Wijenayake, Perera 15; Rebs: Wijenayake 11; Asts: Perera, Thewahettige 2 | | Pts: Sarkis 11; Rebs: Hassoun 16; Asts: Dahdouh, Hassoun, Sarkis 1 |

Surat Thani Gymnasium, Surat Thani
Referees: Lui Wei (CHN), Chan Wai Seong (MAS), Kim Min-Ji (KOR)

June 27
17:00

Report

| Thailand | 55–54 | India |
Scoring by quarter: 22–12, 11–19, 16–18, 6–5
| Pts: Buapa 22; Rebs: Kaichalyapoom 20; Asts: Sawatong 5 | | Pts: Priyadharshini 15; Rebs: Radhakrishnan 11; Asts: Bhuskute 4 |

Surat Thani Gymnasium, Surat Thani
Referees: Karolina Andersson (FIN), Ng Cheng Hou (MAS), Tang Jun (CHN)

== Qualifying round ==
Winners are promoted to Level I for the 2012 championships.

June 29
13:00

Report

| Malaysia | 63–40 | India |
Scoring by quarter: 15–10, 21–8, 13–12, 14–10
| Pts: Ting 12; Rebs: Saw W.Y. 13; Asts: Saw W.Y. 5 | | Pts: Kavita 15; Rebs: Rajguru, Radhakrishnan 8 Asts: Kavita 2 |

Surat Thani Gymnasium, Surat Thani
Referees: Lui Wei (CHN), Lee Ji-Youn (KOR), Glenn Cornelio (PHI)

June 29
15:00

Report

| Kazakhstan | 63–75 | Thailand |
Scoring by quarter: 20–23, 11–12, 14–20, 18–20
| Pts: Vinokurova 29; Rebs: Vinokurova 14; Asts: Abdreupova 4 | | Pts: Kotchrat 24; Rebs: Kotchrat 18; Asts: Sawatong 4 |

Surat Thani Gymnasium, Surat Thani
Referees: Chan Wai Seong (MAS), Hiromi Nakae (JPN), Chen Ming-ling (TPE)

== Final round ==
Semifinals
June 29
Japan | 67
South Korea | 60
June 29
China | 85
Chinese Taipei | 56

Final
June 30
Japan | 78
China | 122
3rd place
June 30
South Korea | 54
Chinese Taipei | 78

=== Semifinals ===
June 29
17:00

Report

| Japan | 67–60 | South Korea |
Scoring by quarter: 19–19, 20–10, 18–15, 10–16
| Pts: Chikahira 18; Rebs: Chikahira, Nagaoka 11; Asts: Watanabe, Katsura 2 | | Pts: Lee Ji.H. 14; Rebs: Lee S.A. 10; Asts: Sim S.Y., Lee Ji.H., Lee S.A. 1 |

Surat Thani Gymnasium, Surat Thani
Referees: Fabiana Nițu (ROU), Ng Cheng Hou (MAS), Watcharin Padungratchadakit (THA)

June 29
19:00

Report

| China | 85–56 | Chinese Taipei |
Scoring by quarter: 21–18, 25–10, 18–17, 21–11
| Pts: Gao S. 22; Rebs: Gao S. 12; Asts: Yang L.W. 3 | | Pts: Huang H.T. 10; Rebs: Liu J.H. 6 Asts: Chang C.F. 3 |

Surat Thani Gymnasium, Surat Thani
Referees: Karolina Andersson (FIN), Rafael Britanico (PHI), Anton Kozlov (KAZ)

=== 3rd place ===
June 29
16:00

Report

| South Korea | 54–78 | Chinese Taipei |
Scoring by quarter: 19–13, 6–18, 17–23, 12–24
| Pts: Lee Je.H. 13; Rebs: Lee Je.H., Lee S.A. 9 Asts: Lee S.A. 1 | | Pts: Lee C.N., Huang H.T., Lin Y.T. 15; Rebs: Chang C.F. 10; Asts: Lin Y.T. 3 |

Surat Thani Gymnasium, Surat Thani
Referees: Karolina Andersson (FIN), Mohammad Nachawati (SYR), Ng Cheng Hou (MAS)

=== Final ===
June 30
18:00

Report

| Japan | 78–122 | China |
Scoring by quarter: 21–30, 21–20, 12–38, 24–34
| Pts: Kanehara 14; Rebs: Nagaoka 5 Asts: Kanehara 2 | | Pts: Gao S. 37; Rebs: Yu D. 13; Asts: Jin W.N. 4 |

Surat Thani Gymnasium, Surat Thani
Referees: Fabiana Nițu (ROU), Watcharin Padungratchadakit (THA), Snehal Bendke (IND)

== Final standing ==
| Qualified for the 2011 FIBA Under-19 World Championship for Women |

| Rank | Team | Record |
|---|---|---|
| 1st place, gold medalist(s) | China | 6–1 |
| 2nd place, silver medalist(s) | Japan | 6–1 |
| 3rd place, bronze medalist(s) | Chinese Taipei | 4–3 |
| 4 | South Korea | 2–5 |
| 5 | Malaysia | 2–4 |
| 6 | Kazakhstan | 0–6 |
| 7 | Thailand | 6–0 |
| 8 | India | 4–2 |
| 9 | Philippines | 3–2 |
| 10 | Sri Lanka | 2–3 |
| 11 | Syria | 1–4 |
| 12 | Laos | 0–5 |

== Awards ==
2010 Asian Under-18 champions

China
Twelfth title
