= Syria women's national under-18 basketball team =

Syrian sports

Syria
- FIBA ranking: 56 ▼5 (as of 2 December 2024)
- FIBA zone: FIBA Asia
- National federation: Syrian Basketball Federation
- Coach: Abdullah Kammouneh
- Nickname(s): Nosour Qasioun (Arabic: نسور قاسيون, lit. 'Qasioun Eagles')

U19 World Cup
- Appearances: None

U18 Asia Cup
- Appearances: 1 (2010)
- Medals: None

U18 Asia Cup Division B
- Appearances: 2
- Medals: (bronze) Bronze: 1 (2018)
Home	Away

The Syria women's national under-18 basketball team is a national basketball team of Syria, administered by the Syrian Basketball Federation. It represents the country in international under-18 women's basketball competitions.

== FIBA Under-18 Women's Asia Cup participations ==
Year	Division A	Division B
2010	11th	
2018		3rd place, bronze medalist(s)
2024		DQ

== Current squad ==
Current roster for the 2018 FIBA Under-18 Women's Asian Championship Division B:

Head Coach: Abdullah Kammouneh

Assistant Coach: Carla Maghamez

- # 2 Stefany Attrash
- # 4 Dalaa Hammoud
- # 5 Rawaa Alhaj-Ali
- # 6 Yana Afif
- # 7 Noura Bshara
- # 8 Jessica Dmian
- # 9 Nelly Tarzi
- # 11 Julnar Mubarak
- # 13 Cedra Allaw
- # 15 Yara Suleimam
- # 88 Anna Aghanian-Aslanian
- # 99 Sham Otabachi

== See also ==
- Syria women's national basketball team
- Syria men's national under-19 basketball team
- Syria women's national under-16 basketball team
