= Laos women's national under-18 basketball team =

Basketball Team

Laos
- FIBA zone: FIBA Asia
- National federation: Fédération de Basketball du Laos

U19 World Cup
- Appearances: None

U18 Asia Cup
- Appearances: 2 (1998, 2010)
- Medals: None

The Laos women's national under-18 basketball team is a national basketball team of Laos, administered by the Fédération de Basketball du Laos. It represents the country in international under-18 women's basketball competitions.

== FIBA Under-18 Women's Asia Cup participations ==
Year	Result
1998	12th
2010	12th

== See also ==
- Laos men's national basketball team
