= 1989 ABC Under-18 Championship for Women =

1989 FIBA U18 Women's Asia Cup
10th FIBA Under-18 Women's Asian Basketball Championship

Tournament details
- Host country: Philippines
- Dates: January 24–February 1
- Teams: 11
- Venue: (in 1 host city)

Final positions
- Champions: China (5th title)

The 1989 ABC Under-18 Championship was the tenth edition of the Asian basketball championship for junior women. The tournament took place in Manila, Philippines from January 24 to February 1, 1989. This competition served as a qualifying tournament for 1989 FIBA Under-19 World Championship for Women.

On July 19, 1988, the Basketball Association of the Philippines announced that the Philippines was given hosting rights for the tournament after the country bested bids by Malaysia, Jordan and Thailand for the hosting rights.

China successfully defended their title they won three years ago also held in Manila, this time after defeating South Korea in the championship match.

== Format ==
11 teams took place in this competition. They were divided to Group A of five teams and Group B of six teams. After a round-robin tournament within each group, the first place in Group A faces the second place in Group B in the semi-final and similarly the first place in Group B faces the second place in Group A.

== Preliminary round ==
=== Group A ===
Team	Pld	W	L	PF	PA	PD	Pts
China	5	0	0	0	0	0	
Japan	5	0	0	0	0	0	
	5	0	0	0	0	0	
	5	0	0	0	0	0	
	5	0	0	0	0	0	

=== Group B ===
Team	Pld	W	L	PF	PA	PD	Pts
South Korea	5	5	0	0	0	0	
Taiwan	5	0	0	0	0	0	
	5	0	0	0	0	0	
	5	0	0	0	0	0	
	5	0	0	0	0	0	
	5	0	0	0	0	0	

24 January 1989

South Korea	139–33	Singapore
Scoring by half: 78-18, 61-15

Rizal Memorial Coliseum, Manila

25 January 1989

South Korea	141–47	India
Scoring by half: 72-24, 69-23

Rizal Memorial Coliseum, Manila

26 January 1989

South Korea	77–63	Taiwan
Scoring by half: 40-37, 37-26

Rizal Memorial Coliseum, Manila

28 January 1989

South Korea	128–18	Hong Kong
Scoring by half: 78-12, 50-6

Rizal Memorial Coliseum, Manila

29 January 1989

South Korea	137–30	Philippines
Scoring by half: 78-8, 59-22

Rizal Memorial Coliseum, Manila

== Final round ==
=== Semi-final ===
31 January 1989

South Korea	99–76	Japan
Scoring by half: 53-44, 46-32

Rizal Memorial Coliseum, Manila

31 January 1989

China	96–76	Taiwan

Rizal Memorial Coliseum, Manila

=== Final ===
2 February 1989

China	82–74	South Korea
Scoring by half: 37-37, 45-37

Rizal Memorial Coliseum, Manila

== Final standings ==
Rank	Team	Record
1st place, gold medalist(s)	China	Qualified for the 1989 FIBA Under-19 World Championship for Women
2nd place, silver medalist(s)	South Korea	
3rd place, bronze medalist(s)	Japan	
4th	Taiwan	
5th	India	
6th	Thailand	
7th	Malaysia	
8th	Singapore	
9th	Philippines	
10th	Sri Lanka	
11th	Hong Kong	

== Awards ==
1989 Asian Under-18 champions

China
Fifth title

== See also ==
- 1989 ABC Under-18 Championship
- 1989 FIBA Under-19 World Championship for Women
