= 1984 ABC Under-18 Championship =

Basketball competition

Tournament details
- Host country: South Korea
- Dates: April 7-19
- Teams: 8
- Venue: 1 (in 1 host city)

Final positions
- Champions: South Korea (2nd title)

The 1984 ABC Under-18 Championship was the eighth edition of the Asian Basketball Confederation (ABC)'s Junior Championship. The games were held at Seoul, South Korea from April 7–19, 1984. Taiwan came to Seoul to participate the competition, but withdrew later due to the conflict about using the Chinese flag during the event.

== Venue ==
The games were held at Jamsil Arena, located in Seoul.

== Preliminary round ==
All times are in Korean Standard Time (UTC+09:00)

=== Group A ===
| Team | Pld | W | L | PF | PA | PD | Pts |
|---|---|---|---|---|---|---|---|
| Philippines | 3 | 2 | 1 | 269 | 212 | 57 | 5 |
| Malaysia | 3 | 2 | 1 | 242 | 227 | 15 | 5 |
| Japan | 3 | 2 | 1 | 233 | 224 | 9 | 5 |
| Singapore | 3 | 0 | 3 | 206 | 287 | -81 | 3 |
| Taiwan | 0 | 0 | 0 | 0 | 0 | 0 | 0 |

7 April 1984
14:30

| Malaysia | 79–75 | Philippines |
Scoring by half: 34–37, 45-38

Jamsil Arena, Seoul

7 April 1984
19:00

| Japan | 88–66 | Singapore |
Scoring by half: 51–38, 37-28

Jamsil Arena, Seoul

8 April 1984
14:30

| Malaysia | 66–77 | Japan |
Scoring by half: 0-0, 0-0

Jamsil Arena, Seoul

8 April 1984
17:30

| Singapore | vs. | Taiwan |
Cancelled

Jamsil Arena, Seoul

9 April 1984
17:30

| Taiwan | vs. | Philippines |
Cancelled

Jamsil Arena, Seoul

10 April 1984
14:30

| Philippines | 102–65 | Singapore |
Scoring by half: 47-32, 55-33

Jamsil Arena, Seoul

11 April 1984
17:30

| Malaysia | 97–75 | Singapore |
Scoring by half: 44-40, 53-35

Jamsil Arena, Seoul

11 April 1984
16:00

| Japan | vs. | Taiwan |

Jamsil Arena, Seoul

11 April 1984
13:00

| Taiwan | vs. | Malaysia |

Jamsil Arena, Seoul

12 April 1984
17:30

| Philippines | 92–68 | Japan |
Scoring by half: 43-45, 49-23

Jamsil Arena, Seoul

=== Group B ===
| Team | Pld | W | L | PF | PA | PD | Pts |
|---|---|---|---|---|---|---|---|
| China | 3 | 3 | 0 | 285 | 138 | 147 | 6 |
| South Korea | 3 | 2 | 1 | 287 | 179 | 108 | 5 |
| Sri Lanka | 3 | 1 | 2 | 157 | 267 | -110 | 4 |
| Indonesia | 3 | 0 | 3 | 157 | 302 | -145 | 3 |

7 April 1984
16:00

| South Korea | 111–36 | Indonesia |
Scoring by half: 65–14, 46-22

Jamsil Arena, Seoul

9 April 1984
13:00

| Indonesia | 38–100 | China |
Scoring by half: 23-53, 15-47

Jamsil Arena, Seoul

9 April 1984
16:00

| Sri Lanka | 48–94 | South Korea |
Scoring by half: 26-51, 22-43

Jamsil Arena, Seoul

10 April 1984
17:30

| China | 90–18 | Sri Lanka |
Scoring by half: 48-10, 42-8

Jamsil Arena, Seoul

12 April 1984
16:00

| Indonesia | 83–91 | Sri Lanka |
Scoring by half: 45-49, 38-42

Jamsil Arena, Seoul

12 April 1984
19:00

| South Korea | 82–95 | China |
Scoring by half: 35-54, 47-41

Jamsil Arena, Seoul

== 7th Place Match ==
17 April 1984
16:00

| Singapore | 56–65 | Indonesia |
Scoring by half: 31-41, 25-24

Jamsil Arena, Seoul

== Final Round ==
| Team | Pld | W | L | PF | PA | PD | Pts |
|---|---|---|---|---|---|---|---|
| South Korea | 5 | 5 | 0 | 445 | 361 | 84 | 10 |
| China | 5 | 4 | 1 | 448 | 319 | 129 | 9 |
| Philippines | 5 | 3 | 2 | 434 | 361 | 73 | 8 |
| Japan | 5 | 2 | 3 | 367 | 416 | -49 | 7 |
| Malaysia | 5 | 1 | 4 | 389 | 394 | -5 | 6 |
| Sri Lanka | 5 | 0 | 5 | 279 | 511 | -232 | 5 |

14 April 1984
13:00

| China | 88–40 | Sri Lanka |
Scoring by half: 60-22, 28-18

Jamsil Arena, Seoul

14 April 1984
16:00

| South Korea | 94–78 | Japan |
Scoring by half: 48-42, 46-36

Jamsil Arena, Seoul

14 April 1984
17:30

| Philippines | 86–63 | Malaysia |
Scoring by half: 48-35, 38-28

Jamsil Arena, Seoul

15 April 1984
11:30

| Malaysia | 57–84 | China |
Scoring by half: 20-49, 38-35

Jamsil Arena, Seoul

15 April 1984
13:00

| Sri Lanka | 57–106 | South Korea |
Scoring by half: 20-50, 37-56

Jamsil Arena, Seoul

15 April 1984
14:30

| Japan | 66–89 | Philippines |
Scoring by half: 30-38, 36-51

Jamsil Arena, Seoul

16 April 1984
14:30

| Sri Lanka | 77–127 | Malaysia |
Scoring by half: 43-67, 34-60

Jamsil Arena, Seoul

16 April 1984
16:00

| China | 107–69 | Japan |
Scoring by half: 50-33, 57-36

Jamsil Arena, Seoul

16 April 1984
17:30

| South Korea | 89–79 | Philippines |
Scoring by half: 46-47, 43-32

Jamsil Arena, Seoul

18 April 1984
13:00

| South Korea | 82–78 | Malaysia |
Scoring by half: 37-46, 45-32

Jamsil Arena, Seoul

18 April 1984
14:30

| Japan | 89–62 | Sri Lanka |
Scoring by half: 42-27, 47-35

Jamsil Arena, Seoul

18 April 1984
17:30

| Philippines | 79–100 | China |
Scoring by half: 43-48, 36-52

Jamsil Arena, Seoul

19 April 1984
13:00

| Sri Lanka | 43–101 | Philippines |
Scoring by half: 35-62, 8-39

Jamsil Arena, Seoul

19 April 1984
14:30

| Malaysia | 64–65 | Japan |
Scoring by half: 32-34, 32-31

Jamsil Arena, Seoul

19 April 1984
17:30

| China | 69–74 | South Korea |
Scoring by half: 32-38, 36-36

Jamsil Arena, Seoul

== Final standings ==
| Rank | Team | Record |
|---|---|---|
| 1st place, gold medalist(s) | South Korea | 7–1 |
| 2nd place, silver medalist(s) | China | 7-1 |
| 3rd place, bronze medalist(s) | Philippines | 5-3 |
| 4th | Japan | 4-4 |
| 5th | Malaysia | 3-5 |
| 6th | Sri Lanka | 1-7 |
| 7th | Indonesia | 1-3 |
| 8th | Singapore | 0-4 |

== Awards ==
1984 Asian Under-18 champions

South Korea
First title

== See also ==
- 1984 ABC Under-18 Championship for Women
