= Fran Belibi =

American basketball player (born 2001)

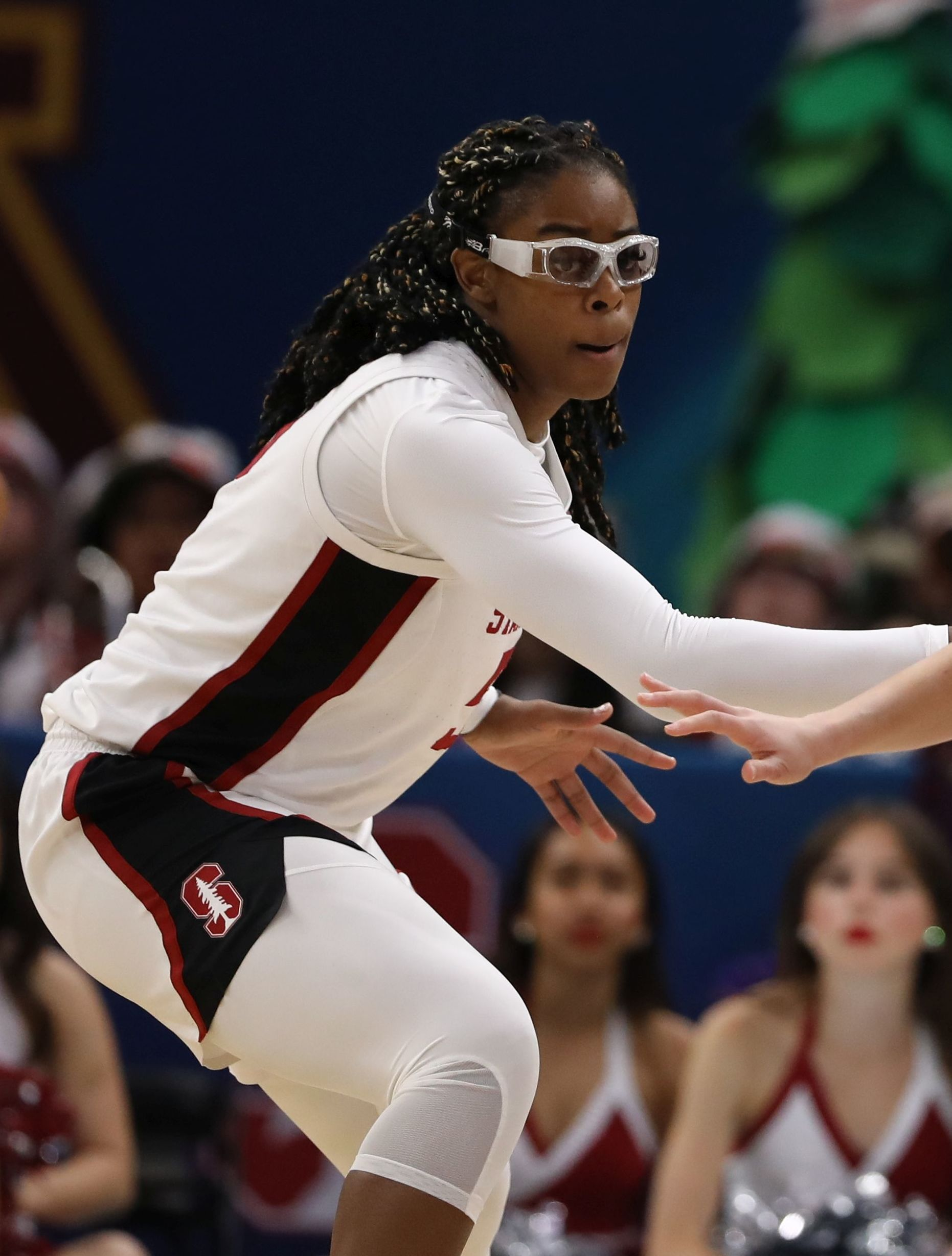
- Belibi with Stanford in 2022

Personal information
- Born: July 20, 2001 (age 25) Kansas City, Kansas, U.S.
- Listed height: 6 ft 1 in (1.85 m)

Career information
- High school: Regis Jesuit (Denver, Colorado)
- College: Stanford (2019–2023)
- Position: Forward

Career highlights
- NCAA champion (2021); McDonald's All-American (2019)
Medals
Women's basketball
Representing the United States
FIBA Under-19 World Cup
Gold medal – first place	2019 Thailand	Team
FIBA Under-17 World Cup
Gold medal – first place	2018 Belarus	Team
FIBA Americas Under-16 Championship
Gold medal – first place	2017 Argentina	Team

Francesca Belibi (born July 20, 2001) is an American former basketball player. She played college basketball for the Stanford Cardinal of the Pac-12 Conference where she won the NCAA championship in 2021. Prior to college, she drew national attention in high school for her dunking ability. In 2020, she became the eighth woman to dunk in a women's college basketball game.

== Early life ==
Belibi was born in Kansas City, Kansas, to Franck and Suzanne Belibi, who were born in Cameroon and moved to Belgium before coming to the United States. The family later moved to Centennial, Colorado.

== High school career ==
Belibi started playing competitive basketball for the first time during her freshman year at Regis Jesuit High School. In 2017, she became the first girl to dunk in a game in Colorado high school history. In February 2019, she pulled off the first ever alley-oop dunk by a female in a high school game in Colorado. As a senior she averaged 21.8 points, 12.3 rebounds, 3.4 steals, 2.7 blocks and 2.3 assists per game. She was named a McDonald's All-American in 2019 and went on to become the second woman to win the dunk contest at the McDonald's All American Game, after Candace Parker who won in 2004.

== College career ==
During her freshman season she averaged 6.6 points and 4.5 rebounds per game in 32 games, making six starts. In December 2020, she became the eighth woman to dunk in a college basketball game when she dunked with under a minute left in the first half of Stanford's victory against California. Eight days later, she had another dunk in a victory against UCLA.

On April 4, 2021, Belibi won the NCAA championship after Stanford beat the Arizona Wildcats, 54–53, in the national title game.

On March 19, 2022, Belibi had the third dunk in NCAA women's tournament history when she dunked midway through the second quarter of Stanford's 78–37 first round victory against Montana State.

Belibi made the decision to forgo her final year of college eligibility resulting from the extra year of COVID-19 eligibility. Instead, Belibi made the decision to retire from basketball and to pursue a Masters in Education from Harvard University in 2023–24.

== National team career ==
Belibi has won three gold medals playing for the United States junior national teams, 2019 FIBA Under-19 Women's Basketball World Cup, 2018 FIBA Under-17 Women's Basketball World Cup and the 2017 FIBA Under-16 Women's Americas Championship.

== Career statistics ==
Legend
GP	Games played	GS	Games started	MPG	Minutes per game	RPG	Rebounds per game
APG	Assists per game	SPG	Steals per game	BPG	Blocks per game	PPG	Points per game
TO	Turnovers per game	FG%	Field-goal percentage	3P%	3-point field-goal percentage	FT%	Free-throw percentage
**Bold**	Career best	°	League leader

=== College ===
Year	Team	GP	GS	MPG	FG%	3P%	FT%	RPG	APG	SPG	BPG	TO	PPG
2019–20	Stanford	32	6	13.8	58.2	0.0	61.5	4.5	0.8	0.7	**0.7**	1.5	6.6
2020–21	Stanford	33	**13**	**14.7**	53.1	0.0	**63.9**	**5.0**	1.0	0.6	0.6	1.5	7.4
2021–22	Stanford	**35**	4	13.5	**59.0**	0.0	61.4	4.5	1.0	**0.8**	0.5	1.3	**7.8**
2022–23	Stanford	34	1	10.3	53.7	0.0	54.1	3.5	1.0	0.7	0.5	0.6	4.0
**Career**		134	24	13.1	56.2	0.0	60.9	4.4	1.0	0.7	0.6	1.2	6.4
Statistics retrieved from Sports-Reference.
