= Sri Lanka men's national under-18 basketball team =

Sri Lanka
- Joined FIBA: 1959
- FIBA zone: FIBA Asia
- National federation: Sri Lanka Basketball Federation

U19 World Cup
- Appearances: None

U18 Asia Cup
- Appearances: 10
- Medals: None

The Sri Lanka men's national under-18 basketball team is a national basketball team of Sri Lanka, administered by the Sri Lanka Basketball Federation. It represents the country in international under-18 men's basketball competitions.

== FIBA U18 Asia Cup participations ==
Year	Result
1977	16th
1980	14th
1984	6th
1989	15th
1990	13th

Year	Result
1992	14th
2000	15th
2002	14th
2010	14th
2026	16th

== See also ==
- Sri Lanka men's national basketball team
- Sri Lanka women's national under-18 basketball team
