= Maria Zaitseva =

Belarusian volunteer

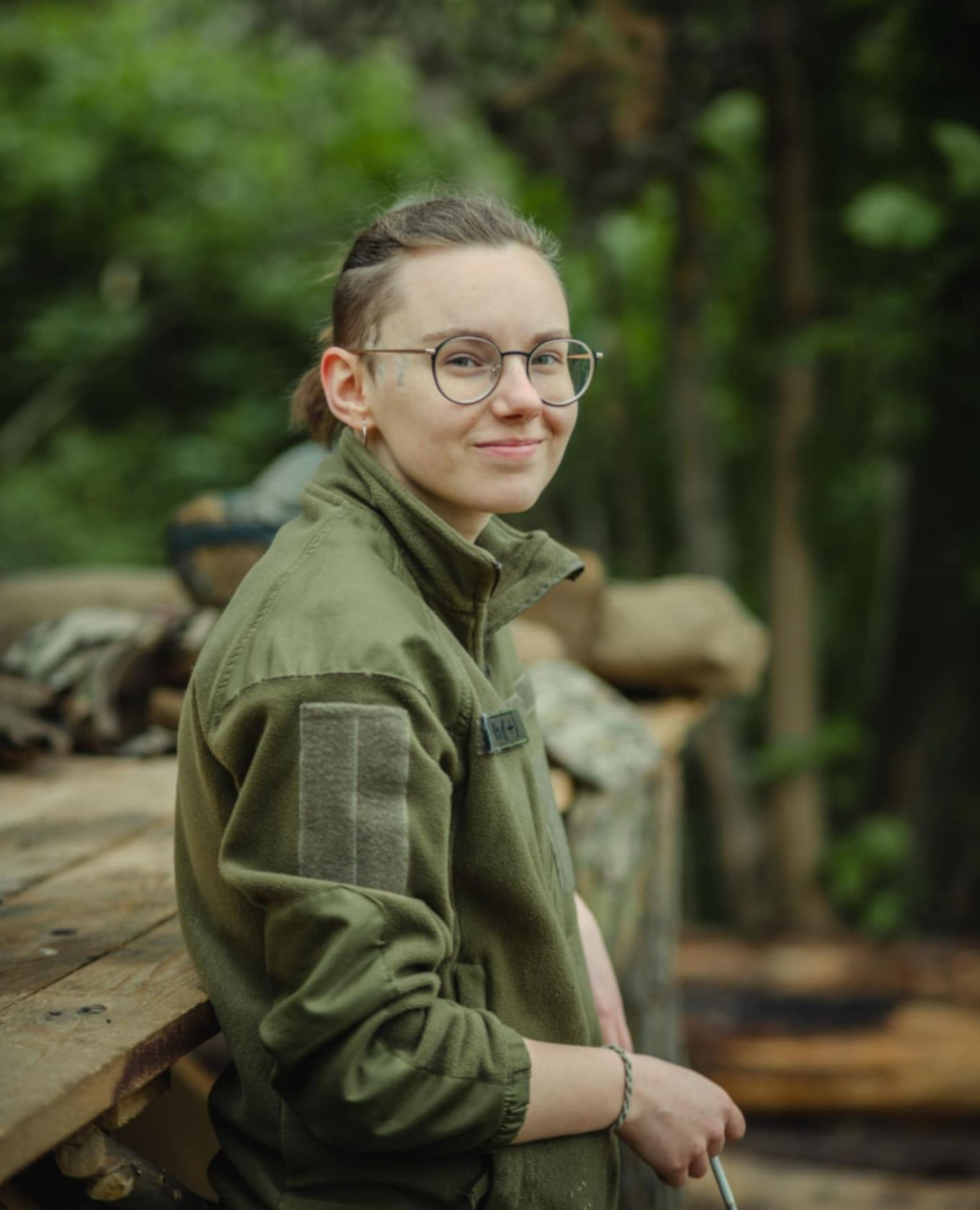
- Born: 16 January 2001; Gomel, Belarus
- Died: 17 January 2025 (aged 24); Bakhmut Raion, Ukraine
- Occupation: Military volunteer

Maria Zaitseva (16 January 2001 – 17 January 2025) was a Belarusian military volunteer in the Second International Legion of Ukraine.

== Biography ==
=== 2020 Belarus election protests ===
Maria Zaitseva went viral on the internet in August 2020, after a photo of her taken during the Belarusian protests circulated showing her sitting bloodied after being injured while taking part in the protests against Alexander Lukashenko's reelection, internationally widely seen as illegitimate. She had traveled from her hometown of Gomel to Minsk to join the protests, despite objections from her family. On the evening of 9 August, she was among the front of the protesters in downtown Minsk facing off against security forces, where she described standing peacefully shouting. The protesters were attacked with stun grenades, rubber bullets and water cannons, and the last thing Zaitseva remembered from the protest was an explosion and her lying on the ground. Following her injury, a photographer took the picture of her sitting quietly on the asphalt covered in blood.

The attack left Zaitseva permanently deaf in one ear, and she also suffered a brain hematoma, as well as severe injuries to her eyes and face. She also described being affected by post-traumatic stress disorder. After undergoing several operations in Belarus, she went to the Czech Republic to receive specialized treatment, where she also began courses at the Czech Technical University.

=== Volunteer in the Ukrainian foreign legion ===
When Russia launched its full-scale invasion of Ukraine in February 2022, she initially voluntereed to help Ukrainian refugees in the Czech Republic. In spring 2023, she joined the Ukrainian Foreign Legion, where she became part of a medical unit, also serving as a translator. Ales Petrouski, Zaitseva's commander in the unit, said that for her, the struggle against Russia for freedom in Belarus and Ukraine were connected, and she partially joined the legion because she wanted Belarus to be free.

After being injured on the front in Ukraine, she returned to the Czech Republic, but after looking for work, she decided to return to Ukraine in January 2024. A year later, she was killed close to Bakhmut on 17 January 2025, a day after her 24th birthday. Her unit reported evacuating her body from the battlefield under Russian artillery fire. Following her death, Belarusian opposition leader Sviatlana Tsikhanouskaya said that Zaitseva "gravely injured during the 2020 Belarus protests, gave her life for freedom" and that she was an "icon of our revolution".
