= Nanako Todo =

Japanese basketball player (born 2000)

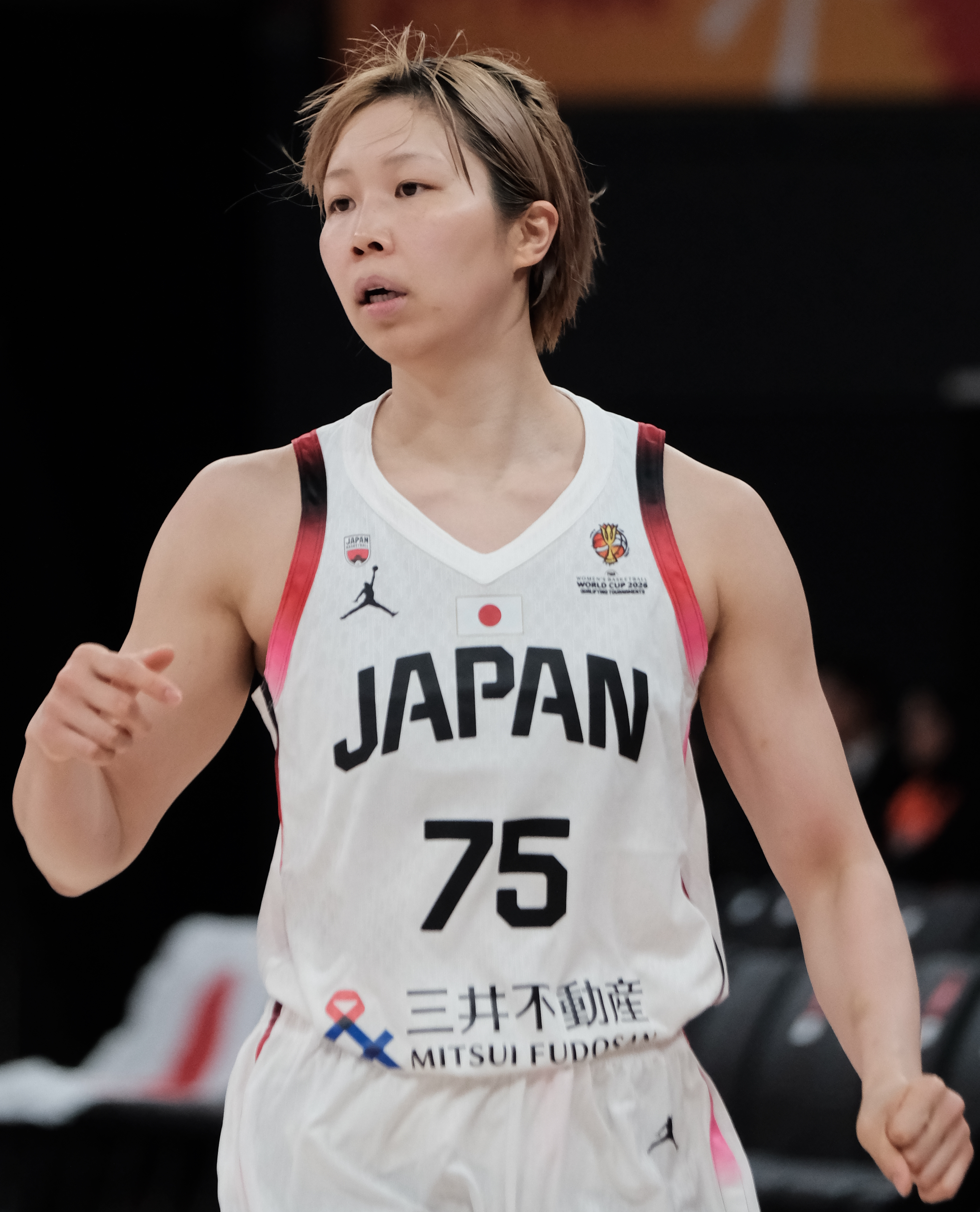

Toyota Boshoku Sunshine Rabbits
- Position: Small forward / Shooting guard
- League: WJBL

Personal information
- Born: November 29, 2000 (age 25)
- Listed height: 5 ft 9 in (1.75 m)
- Listed weight: 146 lb (66 kg)

Nanako Todo (東藤 なな子, Todo Nanako; born 29 November 2000) is a Japanese professional basketball player for the Toyota Boshoku Sunshine Rabbits of the Women's Japan Basketball League (WJBL). Todo represented Japan at the 2020 Summer Olympics, winning a silver medal with the team.

== Career ==
She represented Japan in the 2018 FIBA U17 Women's Asian Championship, and 2019 FIBA U19 Women's Basketball Championship.
