= Chen Mingling =

Chinese basketball player

Personal information
- Born: 25 July 2000 (age 26)
- Listed height: 1.92 m (6 ft 4 in)

Career information
- Playing career: 2017–present

Career history
- 2017–2018: Guangdong Dolphins
- 2018–2023: Xinjiang Tianshan
- 2023–2026: Guangdong Vermilion Birds
- 2026–present: Melbourne Tigers
Medals
Women's 3x3 basketball
Representing China
Asian Games
Gold medal – first place	2022 Hangzhou	Team

Chen Mingling (born 25 July 2000) is a Chinese basketball player. She represented China at the 2024 Summer Olympics in 3x3 event.
