= Li Yuan (basketball) =

Chinese basketball player

No. 2 – Sichuan Yuanda
- Position: Point guard
- League: WCBA

Personal information
- Born: 29 May 2000 (age 26) Yantai, China
- Listed height: 5 ft 7 in (1.70 m)
- Listed weight: 65 kg (143 lb)

Career information
- Playing career: 2018–present

Career history
- 2018–2020: Shandong Six Stars
- 2020–2021: Inner Mongolia Rural Credit Union
- 2021–2023: Shandong Six Stars
- 2023–2025: Inner Mongolia Rural Credit Union
- 2025–present: Sichuan Yuanda
Medals
Women's basketball
Representing China
World Cup
Silver medal – second place	2022 Australia
FIBA Asia Cup
Gold medal – first place	2023 Australia
Silver medal – second place	2021 Jordan
Bronze medal – third place	2025 China
Asian Games
Gold medal – first place	2022 Hangzhou	Team

Li Yuan (Chinese: 李缘; pinyin: Lǐ Yuán; born 29 May 2000) is a Chinese basketball player for Sichuan Yuanda and the Chinese national team.

She participated at the 2018 FIBA Women's Basketball World Cup.
