= Norika Konno =

Japanese basketball player (born 2000)

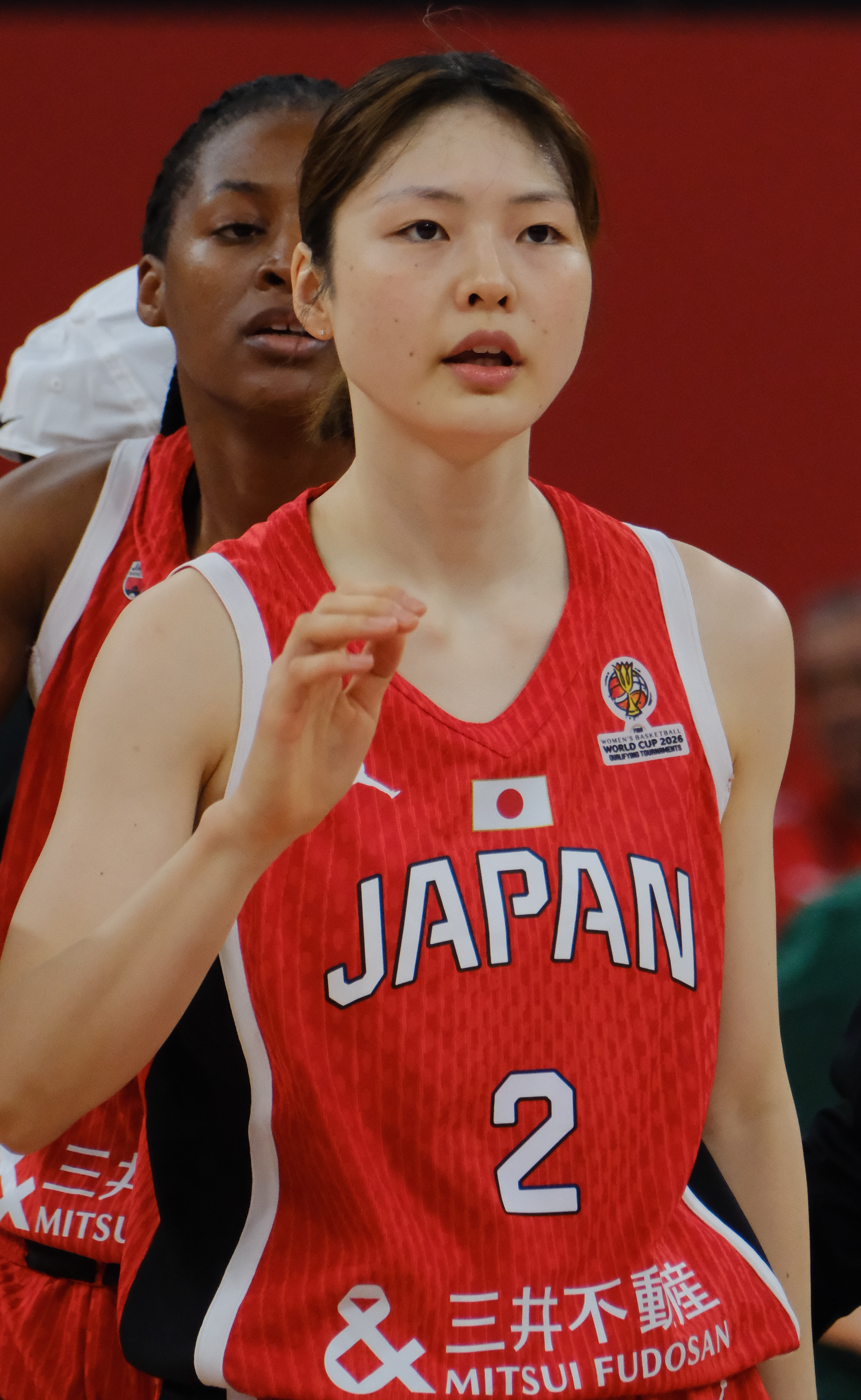

Eneos Sunflowers
- Position: Small forward / shooting guard
- League: WJBL

Personal information
- Born: May 1, 2000 (age 26) Sendai, Miyagi, Japan
- Listed height: 5 ft 10 in (1.78 m)

Career information
- High school: Seiwa (Sendai, Japan)
- College: Louisville (2019–2023)
- Playing career: 2023–present

Career history
- 2023–2026: Denso Iris
- 2026–: Eneos Sunflowers
Medals
Women's 3x3 basketball
Representing Japan
Asian Games
Silver medal – second place	2018 Jakarta (3x3)	Team

Norika Konno (今野 紀花, Konno Norika; born May 1, 2000) is a Japanese professional basketball player for the Eneos Sunflowers of the Women's Japan Basketball League (WJBL).

== Career ==
=== Louisville (2019–2023) ===
Konno played college basketball at the University of Louisville. She averaged 3.1 points and 1.1 assists per game over 4 seasons with the Cardinals.

=== Denso Iris (2023–2026) ===
In June 2023, it was announced that Konno had signed with the Denso Iris of the WJBL. In the 2025–26 season, she played in 24 regular season games and 7 playoff games, contributing to Denso's first championship victory.

=== Eneos Sunflowers (2026–) ===
On June 4 2026, the Eneos Sunflowers announced that they had signed Konno.

=== National Team ===
In 2022, Konno was selected to the Japan women's national 3x3 team. She has also been a member of the national team since 2025.
