= 1990 ABC Under-18 Championship for Women =

1990 FIBA U18 Asia Cup
11th FIBA Under-18 Asian Basketball Championship

Tournament details
- Host country: Japan
- Dates: 25 August–2 September
- Teams: 10 (from 36 federations)
- Venue: 1 (in 1 host city)

Final positions
- Champions: South Korea (6th title)

The 1990 ABC Under-18 Championship was the eleventh edition of the Asian Championship for Junior Women. The tournament took place in Nagoya, Japan from 25 August to 2 September 1990.

Korea won their sixth championship after defeating Japan 80–78 in the final.

== Preliminary round ==
=== Draw ===
- Group X: China, Taiwan, India, Sri Lanka, Hong Kong
- Group Y: South Korea, Japan, Thai, Malaysia, Indonesia

=== Group X ===
Team	Pld	W	L	PF	PA	PD	Pts
China	4	4	0	0	0	0	
Taiwan	4	3	1	0	0	0	
	4	0	0	0	0	0	
	4	0	0	0	0	0	
	4	0	0	0	0	0	

30 August 1990

China	70–66	Taiwan
Scoring by half: 34-33, 36-33

Nagoya Civic General Gymnasium, Nagoya

=== Group Y ===
Team	Pld	W	L	PF	PA	PD	Pts
South Korea	4	4	0	466	168	298	
Japan	4	3	1	0	0	0	
	4	0	0	0	0	0	
	4	0	0	0	0	0	
	4	0	0	0	0	0	

25 August 1990

South Korea	124–40	Indonesia

Nagoya Civic General Gymnasium, Nagoya

27 August 1990

South Korea	115–46	Thailand
Scoring by half: 52-23, 63-23

Nagoya Civic General Gymnasium, Nagoya

28 August 1990

South Korea	115–50	Malaysia
Scoring by half: 59-29, 56-21

Nagoya Civic General Gymnasium, Nagoya

28 August 1990

Japan	112–32	Indonesia

Nagoya Civic General Gymnasium, Nagoya

30 August 1990

South Korea	96–95 (OT)	Japan
Scoring by half: 35-39, 52-48 Overtime: 9-8

Nagoya Civic General Gymnasium, Nagoya

== Final round ==
=== Semi-final ===
31 August 1990

South Korea	96–87	Taiwan
Scoring by half: 49-42, 47-45

Nagoya Civic General Gymnasium, Nagoya

31 August 1990

Japan	81–76	China

Nagoya Civic General Gymnasium, Nagoya

=== 3rd-place game ===
1 September 1990

China	72–50	Taiwan
Scoring by half: 30-30, 42-20

Nagoya Civic General Gymnasium, Nagoya

=== Final ===
1 September 1990

South Korea	80–78	Japan
Scoring by half: 48-40, 32-38

Nagoya Civic General Gymnasium, Nagoya

== Awards ==
1990 Asian Under-18 champions

South Korea
Sixth title

== See also ==
- 1990 ABC Under-18 Championship
