= 2007 FIBA Asia Under-18 Championship for Women =

2007 FIBA U18 Women's Asia Cup
18th FIBA Under-18 Women's Asian Basketball Championship

Tournament details
- Host country: Thailand
- Dates: January 29 – February 5
- Teams: 12 (from 44 federations)
- Venue: 1 (in 1 host city)

Final positions
- Champions: China (11th title)

FIBA Asia Under-18 Championship for Women 2007 is 18th edition of FIBA Asia's basketball championship for females under 18 years old. The games were held at Bangkok, Thailand.

The championship is divided into two levels: Level I and Level II. The two lowest finishers of Level I meets the top two finishers to determine which teams qualify for Level for 2008's championship. The losers are relegated to Level II.

== Participating teams ==
Level I	Level II
China; South Korea; Japan; Chinese Taipei; Thailand; Singapore	Malaysia; India; Hong Kong; Sri Lanka; Vietnam; Kazakhstan

== Preliminary round ==
=== Level I ===
Team	Pld	W	L	PF	PA	PD	Pts
Japan	5	5	0	485	286	+199	10
China	5	4	1	453	313	+140	9
South Korea	5	3	2	459	319	+140	8
Chinese Taipei	5	2	3	452	313	+139	7
Singapore	5	1	4	177	517	−340	6
Thailand	5	0	5	225	503	−278	5

January 29
16:15

Thailand	62–71 (OT)	Singapore
Scoring by quarter: 5–18, 18–14, 14–13, 18–10, Overtime: 7–16

Hua Mark Indoor Stadium, Bangkok

January 29
18:15

Chinese Taipei	68–80	South Korea
Scoring by quarter: 19–19, 14–24, 17–20, 18–17

Hua Mark Indoor Stadium, Bangkok

January 29
20:15

China	71–83	Japan
Scoring by quarter: 30–18, 15–18, 11–30, 15–17

Hua Mark Indoor Stadium, Bangkok

January 30
15:00

Singapore	32–104	China
Scoring by quarter: 9–22, 5–25, 10–28, 8–29

Hua Mark Indoor Stadium, Bangkok

January 30
17:00

Japan	81–70	Chinese Taipei
Scoring by quarter: 22–25, 11–16, 21–12, 27–17

Hua Mark Indoor Stadium, Bangkok

January 30
19:00

South Korea	91–43	Thailand
Scoring by quarter: 25–10, 16–16, 28–6, 22–11

Hua Mark Indoor Stadium, Bangkok

January 31
15:00

Chinese Taipei	130–21	Singapore
Scoring by quarter: 31–8, 33–5, 32–4, 34–4

Hua Mark Indoor Stadium, Bangkok

January 31
17:00

South Korea	89–101	Japan
Scoring by quarter: 34–21, 15–23, 27–30, 13–27

Hua Mark Indoor Stadium, Bangkok

January 31
19:00

China	115–42	Thailand
Scoring by quarter: 33–10, 26–10, 28–12, 28–10

Hua Mark Indoor Stadium, Bangkok

February 1
15:00

Singapore	28–124	South Korea
Scoring by quarter: 0–24, 10–27, 11–33, 7–40

Hua Mark Indoor Stadium, Bangkok

February 1
17:00

Thailand	31–123	Japan
Scoring by quarter: 2–38, 12–28, 10–24, 7–33

Hua Mark Indoor Stadium, Bangkok

February 1
19:00

Chinese Taipei	81–84	China
Scoring by quarter: 16–24, 27–14, 13–21, 25–25

Hua Mark Indoor Stadium, Bangkok

February 3
15:00

Japan	97–25	Singapore
Scoring by quarter: 26–6, 24–5, 28–9, 19–5

Hua Mark Indoor Stadium, Bangkok

February 3
17:00

South Korea	75–79	China
Scoring by quarter: 24–17, 18–21, 18–22, 15–19

Hua Mark Indoor Stadium, Bangkok

February 3
19:00

Thailand	43–103	Chinese Taipei
Scoring by quarter: 6–20, 16–22, 13–24, 12–37

Hua Mark Indoor Stadium, Bangkok

=== Level II ===
Team	Pld	W	L	PF	PA	PD	Pts	Tiebreaker
India	5	4	1	399	330	+69	9	1–0
Malaysia	5	4	1	383	318	+65	9	0–1
Kazakhstan	5	3	2	403	335	+68	8	1–0
Hong Kong	5	3	2	371	391	+80	8	0–1
Vietnam	5	1	4	325	457	−132	6	
Sri Lanka	5	0	5	292	442	−150	5	

January 29
11:00

India	71–67 (OT)	Malaysia
Scoring by quarter: 19–24, 16–13, 21–10, 9–18, Overtime: 6–2

Hua Mark Indoor Stadium, Bangkok

January 29
13:00

Vietnam	51–87	Hong Kong
Scoring by quarter: 13–23, 11–28, 15–21, 12–15

Hua Mark Indoor Stadium, Bangkok

January 30
11:00

Hong Kong	84–58	India
Scoring by quarter: 21–14, 13–21, 28–17, 22–6

Hua Mark Indoor Stadium, Bangkok

January 30
13:00

Sri Lanka	77–84	Vietnam
Scoring by quarter: 13–16, 22–25, 13–20, 29–23

Hua Mark Indoor Stadium, Bangkok

January 31
11:00

Vietnam	62–101	Kazakhstan
Scoring by quarter: 17–30, 12–29, 15–18, 18–24

Hua Mark Indoor Stadium, Bangkok

January 31
13:00

Malaysia	96–54	Sri Lanka
Scoring by quarter: 22–20, 20–8, 27–15, 27–11

Hua Mark Indoor Stadium, Bangkok

February 1
11:00

Kazakhstan	68–70	Malaysia
Scoring by quarter: 21–12, 14–16, 18–22, 15–20

Hua Mark Indoor Stadium, Bangkok

February 1
13:00

India	92–49	Sri Lanka
Scoring by quarter: 14–12, 36–19, 27–6, 15–12

Hua Mark Indoor Stadium, Bangkok

February 2
11:00

Vietnam	69–89	Malaysia
Scoring by quarter: 14–18, 19–21, 14–23, 22–27

Hua Mark Indoor Stadium, Bangkok

February 2
13:00

Kazakhstan	71–75	India
Scoring by quarter: 12–18, 11–15, 27–16, 21–26

Hua Mark Indoor Stadium, Bangkok

February 2
15:00

Sri Lanka	51–77	Hong Kong
Scoring by quarter: 10–22, 11–19, 18–15, 12–21

Hua Mark Indoor Stadium, Bangkok

February 3
11:00

Hong Kong	67–70 (OT)	Kazakhstan
Scoring by quarter: 13–9, 14–20, 17–12, 22–25, Overtime: 1–4

Hua Mark Indoor Stadium, Bangkok

February 3
13:00

India	103–59	Vietnam
Scoring by quarter: 20–15, 26–12, 31–13, 26–19

Hua Mark Indoor Stadium, Bangkok

February 4
13:00

Kazakhstan	93–61	Sri Lanka
Scoring by quarter: 18–2, 28–18, 20–20, 27–21

Hua Mark Indoor Stadium, Bangkok

February 4
15:00

Malaysia	61–56	Hong Kong
Scoring by quarter: 12–11, 13–12, 16–25, 20–8

Hua Mark Indoor Stadium, Bangkok

== Qualifying round ==
Winners are promoted to Level I for the 2008 championships.

February 5
11:00

Singapore	42–72	Malaysia
Scoring by quarter: 13–20, 8–21, 5–15, 16–16

Hua Mark Indoor Stadium, Bangkok

February 5
13:00

Thailand	60–77	India
Scoring by quarter: 13–16, 21–21, 17–19, 9–21

Hua Mark Indoor Stadium, Bangkok

== Final round ==
Semifinals
February 4
Japan	111
Chinese Taipei	67
February 4
China	85
South Korea	70

Final
February 5
Japan	68
China	81
3rd place
February 5
Chinese Taipei	70
South Korea	89

=== Semifinals ===
February 4
17:00

Japan	111–67	Chinese Taipei
Scoring by quarter: 31–16, 25–22, 25–14, 30–15

Hua Mark Indoor Stadium, Bangkok

February 4
19:00

China	85–70	South Korea
Scoring by quarter: 16–18, 21–12, 22–22, 26–18

Hua Mark Indoor Stadium, Bangkok

=== 3rd place ===
February 5
15:00

Chinese Taipei	70–89	South Korea
Scoring by quarter: 20–16, 11–23, 20–28, 19–22

Hua Mark Indoor Stadium, Bangkok

=== Final ===
February 5
17:00

Japan	68–81	China
Scoring by quarter: 24–21, 17–21, 8–20, 19–19
Pts: Nakahata 22; Rebs: Takahashi 7 Asts: Honda 1		Pts: Zeng M.L. 19; Rebs: Zeng M.L. 11; Asts: Yang B.B. 2

Hua Mark Indoor Stadium, Bangkok

== Final standing ==
Qualified for the 2007 FIBA Under-19 World Championship for Women

Rank	Team	Record
1st place, gold medalist(s)	China	6–1
2nd place, silver medalist(s)	Japan	6–1
3rd place, bronze medalist(s)	South Korea	4–3
4	Chinese Taipei	2–5
5	Singapore	1–5
6	Thailand	0–6
7	India	5–1
8	Malaysia	5–1
9	Kazakhstan	3–2
10	Hong Kong	3–2
11	Vietnam	1–4
12	Sri Lanka	0–5

== Awards ==
2007 Asian Under-18 champions

China
Eleventh title
