= List of cities in East, South, and Southeast Asia by population =

The countries and territories included in the following list are:

East Asia

- China
  - Hong Kong
  - Macau
- Japan
- Mongolia
- North Korea
- South Korea
- Taiwan

South Asia

- Afghanistan
- Bangladesh
- Bhutan
- British Indian Ocean Territory
- India
- Maldives
- Nepal
- Pakistan
- Sri Lanka

Southeast Asia

- Brunei
- Cambodia
- Christmas Island
- Cocos (Keeling) Islands
- East Timor
- Indonesia
- Laos
- Malaysia
- Myanmar
- Philippines
- Singapore
- Thailand
- Vietnam

== Largest megalopolis areas ==
Rank	Metropolitan area	Country	Region	Population
1	Southern China Coast Megalopolis (Pearl River Delta -Chaoshan-Xiamen-Quanzhou-Fuzhou)	China	East Asia	200,000,000
2	Java Island (Jakarta-Surabaya-Bandung-Semarang-Surakarta-Yogyakarta-Malang)	Indonesia	Southeast Asia	145,000,000
3	Yangtze River Delta	China	East Asia	100,000,000
4	Taiheiyō Belt	Japan	East Asia	84,000,000
5	(Bengal Megalopolis) Kolkata-Khulna-Dhaka-Chittagong	India, Bangladesh	South Asia	60,000,000
6	Beijing–Tianjin (Hebei's cities cluster)	China	East Asia	39,710,000
7	Mega Manila (Metro Manila–Laguna–Cavite–Rizal–Bulacan–Metro Clark–Lucena–Batangas City–Cabanatuan–Olongapo)	Philippines	Southeast Asia	35,000,000
8	Incheon–Seoul–Daejon–Daegu–Busan	South Korea	East Asia	32,890,000
9	Mumbai-Pune-Nashik	India	South Asia	30,000,000
10	Delhi-Gurgaon-Noida-Ghaziabad	India	South Asia	26,000,000
12	Greater Bangkok–Chon Buri-Nakhon Ratchasima	Thailand	Southeast Asia	20,000,000
13	(West coast of Taiwan) Taipei-Taichung-Kaohsiung	Taiwan	East Asia	18,000,000

== Largest metropolitan areas ==
Rank	Metropolitan area	Country	Region	Population	Area (km²)	Population Density (People/km²)
1	Greater Tokyo	Japan	East Asia	32,450,000	8,014	4,049
2	Jakarta	Indonesia	Southeast Asia	31,650,000	6,342	4,990
3	Manila	Philippines	Southeast Asia	28,250,517	7,967	9,200
4	Seoul	South Korea	East Asia	20,550,000	5,076	4,048
5	Mumbai	India	South Asia	20,900,000	8,100	2,580
6	Shanghai	China	East Asia	16,650,000	5,177	3,216
7	Hong Kong-Shenzhen	China	East Asia	15,800,000	3,051	5,179
8	Beijing	China	East Asia	12,500,000	6,562	1,905

== Largest urban areas ranked by 2010 population ==
Rank	City	Country	Region	Population	Area (km²)	Density (km²)	Sources of Pop. / Area	Image
1	Tokyo–Yokohama	Japan	East Asia	35,200,000	7,835	4,100	C / B	
2	Jakarta	Indonesia	Southeast Asia	22,000,000	2,720	8,500	F / B	
3	Manila	Philippines	Southeast Asia	20,795,000	1,425	14,600	C / B	
4	Seoul–Incheon	South Korea	East Asia	19,910,000	1,943	10,200	C / B	
5	Shanghai	China	East Asia	18,400,000	2,396	6,300	C / B	
6	Osaka–Kobe–Kyoto	Japan	East Asia	17,320,000	2,720	5,300	C / B	
7	Shenzhen	China	East Asia	14,470,000	1,295	10,200	F / B	
8	Beijing	China	East Asia	13,955,000	2,616	4,200	C / B	
9	Guangzhou–Foshan	China	East Asia	13,245,000	2,590	6,700	E / B	
10	Dongguan	China	East Asia	10,525,00	1,295	7,600	F / B	
11	Nagoya	Japan	East Asia	10,025,000	3,302		C / B	
12	Taipei-New Taipei-Keelung-Taoyuan	Taiwan	East Asia	9,272,082	3,678	2,521	D / B	
13	Bangkok	Thailand	Southeast Asia	8,250,000	1,502	2,500	C / B	
14	Ho Chi Minh City	Vietnam	Southeast Asia	7,785,000	609	9,200	E / B	
15	Hong Kong	China	East Asia	7,055,000	220	25,200	E / B	
16	Tianjin	China	East Asia	6,675,000	1,295	5,200	C / B	
17	Kuala Lumpur	Malaysia	Southeast Asia	5,835,000	2,137	2,700	E / B	
18	Chongqing	China	East Asia	5,460,000	570	7,500	E / B	
19	Hangzhou	China	East Asia	5,305,000	712	8,200	E / B	
20	Wuhan	China	East Asia	5,260,000	712	7,400	E / B	
21	Shenyang	China	East Asia	5,160,000	777	7,100	E / B	
22	Chengdu	China	East Asia	4,785,000	570	8,400	E / B	
23	Singapore	Singapore	Southeast Asia	4,635,000	479	9,700	D / B	
24	Yangon	Myanmar	Southeast Asia	4,400,000	350	12,600	D / B	
25	Xi'an	China	East Asia	3,955,000	531	7,400	E / B	
26	Taichung-Changhua	Taiwan	East Asia	3,814,326	1,801	2,118	E / B	
27	Harbin	China	East Asia	3,615,000	570	5,900	E / B	
28	Suzhou	China	East Asia	3,605,000	635	5,700	E / B	
29	Bandung	Indonesia	Southeast Asia	3,555,000	401	8,400	E / B	
30	Nanjing	China	East Asia	3,550,000	686	4,200	E / B	
31	Busan	South Korea	East Asia	3,395,000	259	13,100	E / B	
32	Pyongyang	North Korea	East Asia	3,370,000	207	16,300	E / B	
33	Dalian	China	East Asia	3,255,000	570	4,700	E / B	
34	Changchun	China	East Asia	3,170,000	376	8,400	E / B	
35	Kunming	China	East Asia	3,070,000	518	9,100	E / B	
36	Kaohsiung	Taiwan	East Asia	3,023,225	1,330	2,272	E / B	
37	Wuxi	China	East Asia	2,925,000	389	7,500	E / B	
38	Taiyuan	China	East Asia	2,900,000	311	9,300	E / B	
39	Surabaya	Indonesia	Southeast Asia	2,885,000	376	7,700	D / B	
40	Changsha	China	East Asia	2,720,000	389	6,600	E / B	
41	Zhengzhou	China	East Asia	2,590,000	466	5,600	E / B	
42	Fukuoka	Japan	East Asia	2,550,000	583	4,900	C / B	
43	Shijiazhuang	China	East Asia	2,530,000	363	7,000	E / B	
45	Qingdao	China	East Asia	2,495,000	440	5,700	E / B	
46	Sapporo	Japan	East Asia	2,475,000	648	4,000	C / B	
47	Nanchang	China	East Asia	2,465,000	155	5,300	E / B	
48	Guiyang	China	East Asia	2,440,000	207	11,800	E / B	
49	George Town	Malaysia	Southeast Asia	2,412,616	2,563	941	A / A	
50	Fuzhou	China	East Asia	2,405,000	259	9,300	E / B	
51	Lanzhou	China	East Asia	2,385,000	181	13,200	E / B	
52	Daegu	South Korea	East Asia	2,380,000	181	13,100	E / B	
53	Hanoi	Vietnam	Southeast Asia	2,355,000	194	8,300	E / B	
54	Medan	Indonesia	Southeast Asia	2,340,000	246	9,500	E / B	
55	Jinan	China	East Asia	2,320,000	350	6,600	E / B	
56	Changzhou	China	East Asia	2,275,000	194	11,700	E / B	
57	Xiamen	China	East Asia	2,225,000	295	7,500	E / B	
58	Shunde	China	East Asia	2,105,000	401	5,200	E / B	
59	Baotou	China	East Asia	2,095,000	363	5,800	E / B	
60	Jilin	China	East Asia	2,070,000	233	8,900	E / B	
61	Hefei	China	East Asia	2,000,000	350	5,700	E / B	
62	Kitakyūshū	Japan	East Asia	2,000,000	842	2,400	C / B	

- Sources

A: National census authority data.
B: Demographia land area estimate based upon map or satellite photograph analysis.
C: Demographia population "build up" from third, fourth or fifth order jurisdictions (NUTS-3, NUTS-4, NUTS-5 or equivalent).
D: Population estimate based upon United Nations agglomeration estimate.
E: Demographia population estimate from national census authority agglomeration data.
F: Other Demographia population estimate.
G: Estimate based upon projected growth rate from last census.
H: Combination of adjacent national census authority agglomerations.

== Largest urban agglomerations by population ==
Asia Rank	World Rank	Urban Area	Country/Territory	Population	Area (km^{2})	Density (people/km^{2})
1	1	Tokyo	Japan	37,977,000	8,230	4,614
2	2	Jakarta	Indonesia	34,540,000	3,540	9,758
3	3	Delhi	India	29,617,000	2,232	13,269
4	4	Mumbai	India	23,355,000	944	24,740
5	5	Manila	Philippines	23,088,000	1,873	12,327
6	6	Shanghai	China	22,120,000	4,068	5,437
7	8	Seoul	South Korea	21,794,000	2,768	7,873
8	10	Guangzhou-Foshan	China	20,902,000	4,342	4,814
9	12	Beijing	China	19,433,000	4,172	4,658
10	14	Kolkata	India	17,560,000	1,351	12,994
11	16	Bangkok	Thailand	17,066,000	3,199	5,336
12	18	Shenzhen	China	15,929,000	1,803	8,836
13	19	Dhaka	Bangladesh	15,443,000	456	33,852
14	23	Osaka-Kobe-Kyoto	Japan	14,977,000	3,019	4,961
16	25	Bengaluru	India	13,707,000	1,205	11,378
17	28	Ho Chi Minh City	Vietnam	13,312,000	1,638	8,127
18	29	Chennai	India	11,324,000	1,049	10,800
19	30	Chengdu	China	11,309,000	1,828	6,188
21	35	Tianjin	China	10,800,000	2,813	3,839
22	37	Hyderabad	India	9,746,000	1,273	7,654
23	40	Nagoya	Japan	9,113,000	3,704	2,460
24	42	Wuhan	China	8,962,000	1,646	5,444
25	43	Taipei	Taiwan	8,918,000	1,076	8,289
26	45	Kuala Lumpur	Malaysia	8,285,000	2,162	3,833
27	46	Dongguan	China	7,981,000	1,755	4,546
28	47	Pune	India	7,764,000	649	11,956
29	48	Chongqing	China	7,739,000	1,537	5,036
30	50	Nanjing	China	7,496,000	1,613	4,649
31	51	Ahmedabad	India	7,410,000	359	20,622
32	52	Hong Kong	Hong Kong	7,347,000	291	25,254
33	55	Shenyang-Fushun	China	7,105,000	1,515	4,690
34	56	Bandung	Indonesia	7,065,000	487	14,510
35	61	Zhengzhou	China	6,765,000	1,656	4,085
36	63	Xi'an	China	6,680,000	1,094	6,105
37	64	Hanoi	Vietnam	6,576,000	963	6,828
38	65	Surabaya	Indonesia	6,499,000	911	7,131
39	68	Hangzhou	China	6,446,000	1,446	4,458
40	63	Quanzhou	China	6,345,000	2,090	3,036
41	70	Yangon	Myanmar	6,314,000	603	10,474
42	77	Qingdao	China	5,911,000	1,656	3,569
43	78	Surat	India	5,807,000	238	24,378

== Largest cities proper by population ==
Rank	City	Population	Definition	Area (km²)	Population density (/km²)	Country	Region
1	Manila	14,942,000	National Capital Region	638	21,000	Philippines	Southeast Asia
2	Shanghai	13,831,900	Core districts + inner suburbs	1,928	7,174	China	East Asia
3	Seoul	10,456,034	Special City	605.4	17,271	South Korea	East Asia
4	Beijing	10,123,000	Core districts + inner suburbs	1,368.32	7,400	China	East Asia
5	Tokyo	8,795,000	23 special wards area	617	14,254	Japan	East Asia
6	Jakarta	8,489,910	Special capital district	664	12,738	Indonesia	Southeast Asia
7	Wuhan	8,001,541 (2006-12-31)	Core districts	400	20,004	China	East Asia
8	Ho Chi Minh City	7,123,340	Province-level municipality	2,095.01	3,401	Vietnam	Southeast Asia
9	Bangkok	7,025,000	Administrative area	1,568.74	4,478	Thailand	Southeast Asia
10	Hong Kong	7,008,900	The entire territory	1,092	6,418	China	East Asia
11	Guangzhou	6,172,839 (2006-12-31)	Core districts	3,843.43	3,004	China	East Asia
12	Tianjin	5,800,000	Core districts + inner suburbs	2,057	2,820	China	East Asia
13	Singapore	4,839,400	City-state	701	6,904	Singapore	Southeast Asia
14	Chongqing	4,776,027	Core districts	5,467.2	1,057	China	East Asia
15	Shenyang	4,101,197 (2006-12-31)	Core districts	3,495	1,173	China	East Asia
16	Yangon	4,088,000	Urban agglomeration	598.75	6,828	Myanmar	Southeast Asia
17	Yokohama	3,670,000	City proper	437	8,398	Japan	East Asia
18	Busan	3,596,076	Metropolitan City	765.66	4,697	South Korea	East Asia
19	Pyongyang	3,255,388	Directly Governed City	3,194	1,019	North Korea	East Asia
20	Cebu	3,162,009	Metropolitan City	1,062	3,000	Philippines	Southeast Asia

== See also ==
- Administrative divisions of the People's Republic of China
- List of cities in the People's Republic of China by population
- List of top Chinese cities by GDP
- List of top Chinese cities by GDP per capita
- List of metropolitan areas in Taiwan
- List of Taiwanese counties and cities by population
- List of metropolitan areas by population
- Cities of South Korea
- Cities of North Korea
- List of Japanese cities by population
