= East Asia =

Subregion of the Asian continent

- Area: 11,840,000 km^{2} (4,570,000 sq mi) (3rd)
- Population: ▲1.6 billion (2023; 2nd)
- Population density: 141.9 km^{2} (54.8 sq mi)
- GDP (PPP): ▲$58.2 trillion (2026)
- GDP (nominal): ▲$29.6 trillion (2026)
- GDP per capita: ▲$18,500 (nominal) ▲$36,375 (PPP)
- Demonym: East Asian
- Countries: 6 countries: China; Japan; Mongolia; North Korea; South Korea; Taiwan
- Dependencies: Two special administrative regions of China: Hong Kong; Macau
- Languages: Chinese; Japanese; Mongolian; Korean; Tibetan; Others
- Time zones: UTC+7, UTC+8 & UTC+9
- Largest cities: List of urban areas: Beijing; Busan; Chengdu; Daegu; Guangzhou; Hangzhou; Hong Kong; Kaohsiung; Macau; Nagoya; Nanjing; Osaka; Seoul; Shanghai; Shenzhen; Taipei; Tokyo; Yokohama
- UN M49 codes: 030 – Eastern Asia; 142 – Asia; 001 – World

East Asia

Chinese name
- Simplified Chinese: 东亚/东亚细亚
- Traditional Chinese: 東亞/東亞細亞
Transcriptions
Standard Mandarin
- Hanyu Pinyin: Dōngyǎ/Dōngyà or Dōng Yǎxìyǎ/Dōng Yàxìyà
- Wade–Giles: Tung1-ya3
Wu
- Romanization: ton^{平} ia^{去}
Gan
- Romanization: Tung1 nga3
Hakka
- Romanization: dung^{24} a^{31}
Yue: Cantonese
- Jyutping: dung1 aa3
Southern Min
- Hokkien POJ: Tang-a

Tibetan name
- Tibetan: ཨེ་ཤ་ཡ་ཤར་མ་

Korean name
- Hangul: 동아시아/동아세아/동아
- Hanja: 東아시아/東亞細亞/東亞
Transcriptions
- Revised Romanization: Dong Asia/Dong Asea/Dong A

Mongolian name
- Mongolian Cyrillic: Зүүн Ази ᠵᠡᠭᠦᠨ ᠠᠽᠢ
Transcriptions
- SASM/GNC: Dzuun Azi

Japanese name
- Kana: ひがしアジア/とうあ
- Kyūjitai: 東亞細亞/東亞
- Shinjitai: 東亜細亜（東アジア）/東亜
Transcriptions
- Revised Hepburn: Higashi Ajia/Tō-A
- Kunrei-shiki: Higasi Azia/Tou-A

Uyghur name
- Uyghur: شەرقىي ئاسىي
Transcriptions
- Latin Yëziqi: sherqiy asiy

East Asia is a geocultural region of Asia. It includes China, Japan, Mongolia, North Korea, South Korea, and Taiwan, plus two special administrative regions of China: Hong Kong and Macau. The economies of China, Japan, South Korea, and Taiwan are among the world's largest, fastest-growing, and most prosperous. East Asia borders North Asia to the north, Southeast Asia to the south, South Asia to the southwest, and Central Asia to the west. To its east is the Pacific Ocean.

East Asia, especially the Chinese civilization, is regarded as one of the earliest cradles of civilization. Other ancient civilizations in East Asia that still exist as independent countries in the present day include the Japanese, Korean, and Mongolian civilizations. Various other civilizations existed as independent polities in East Asia in the past but have since been absorbed into neighbouring civilizations in the present day, such as Tibet, Manchuria, and Ryukyu (Okinawa), among many others. Taiwan has a relatively young history in the region after the prehistoric era; originally, it was a major site of Austronesian civilization prior to colonization by European colonial powers and China from the 17th century onward. For thousands of years, China was the leading civilization in the region, exerting influence on its neighbours. Historically, societies in East Asia have fallen within the Chinese sphere of influence, and East Asian vocabularies and scripts are often derived from Classical Chinese and Chinese script. The Chinese calendar serves as the root from which many other East Asian calendars are derived.

Major religions in East Asia include Buddhism (mostly Mahayana), Confucianism and Neo-Confucianism, Taoism, ancestral worship, and Chinese folk religion in Mainland China, Hong Kong, Macau and Taiwan, Shinto in Japan, and Christianity and Musok in Korea. Tengerism and Tibetan Buddhism are prevalent among Mongols and Tibetans while other religions such as Shamanism are widespread among the indigenous populations of northeastern China such as the Manchus. The major languages in East Asia include Mandarin Chinese, Japanese, and Korean. The major ethnic groups of East Asia include the Han in China and Taiwan, Yamato in Japan, Koreans in North and South Korea, and Mongols in Mongolia. There are 76 officially-recognized minority or indigenous ethnic groups in East Asia; 55 native to mainland China (including Hui, Manchus, Chinese Mongols, Tibetans, Uyghurs, and Zhuang in the frontier regions), 16 native to the island of Taiwan (collectively known as Taiwanese indigenous peoples), 1 native to the Japanese island of Hokkaido (the Ainu) and 4 native to Mongolia (Turkic peoples). The Ryukyuan people are an unrecognized ethnic group indigenous to the Ryukyu Islands in southern Japan, which stretch from Kyushu to Taiwan. There are also several unrecognized indigenous ethnic groups in mainland China and Taiwan.

East Asia is inhabited by around 1.65 billion people, making up nearly 33% of the population in continental Asia and 20% of the global population. The region is home to major world metropolises such as Beijing–Tianjin, Busan–Daegu–Ulsan–Changwon, Chongqing, Guangzhou-Hong Kong-Macau, Osaka–Kyoto–Kobe, Seoul-Incheon, Shanghai, Taipei, and Tokyo. Although the coastal and riparian areas of the region form one of the world's most populated places, the population in Mongolia and Western China, both landlocked areas, is very sparsely distributed, with Mongolia having the lowest population density of a sovereign state. As of 2025, the overall population density of the region is 133 inhabitants per square kilometre (340/sq mi), about three times the world average of 45/km^{2} (120/sq mi).

== History ==
=== Ancient era ===
China was the first region settled in East Asia and was undoubtedly the core of East Asian civilization from where other parts of East Asia were formed. The various other regions in East Asia were selective in the Chinese influences they adopted into their local customs. Historian Ping-ti Ho referred to China as the cradle of Eastern civilization, in parallel with the cradle of Middle Eastern civilization along the Fertile Crescent encompassing Mesopotamia and Ancient Egypt as well as the cradle of Western civilization encompassing Ancient Greece.

Chinese civilization emerged early, and prefigured other East Asian civilisations. Throughout history, imperial China would exert cultural, economic, technological, and political influence on its neighbours. Succeeding Chinese dynasties exerted enormous influence across East Asia culturally, economically, politically and militarily for over two millennia. The tributary system of China shaped much of East Asia's history for over two millennia due to Imperial China's economic and cultural influence over the region, and thus played a huge role in the history of East Asia in particular. Imperial China's cultural preeminence not only led the country to become East Asia's first literate nation in the entire region, it also supplied Japan and Korea with Chinese loanwords and linguistic influences rooted in their writing systems.

Under Emperor Wu of Han, the Han dynasty made China the regional powerhouse in East Asia, projecting much of its imperial influence onto its neighbours. Han China hosted the largest unified population in East Asia, the most literate and urbanised as well as being the most economically developed, as well as the most technologically and culturally advanced civilization in the region at the time. Cultural and religious interaction between the Chinese and other regional East Asian dynasties and kingdoms occurred. China's impact and influence on Korea began with the Han dynasty's northeastern expansion in 108 BC when the Han Chinese conquered the northern part of the Korean peninsula and established a province called Lelang. Chinese influences were transmitted and soon took root in Korea through the inclusion of the Chinese writing system, monetary system, rice culture, philosophical schools of thought, and Confucian political institutions. Jomon society in ancient Japan incorporated wet-rice cultivation and metallurgy through its contact with Korea. Starting in the fourth century AD, Japan adopted Chinese characters, which remain integral to the Japanese writing system. Utilizing the Chinese writing system allowed the Japanese to conduct their daily activities, maintain historical records and give form to various ideas, thoughts, and philosophies.

=== Medieval era ===
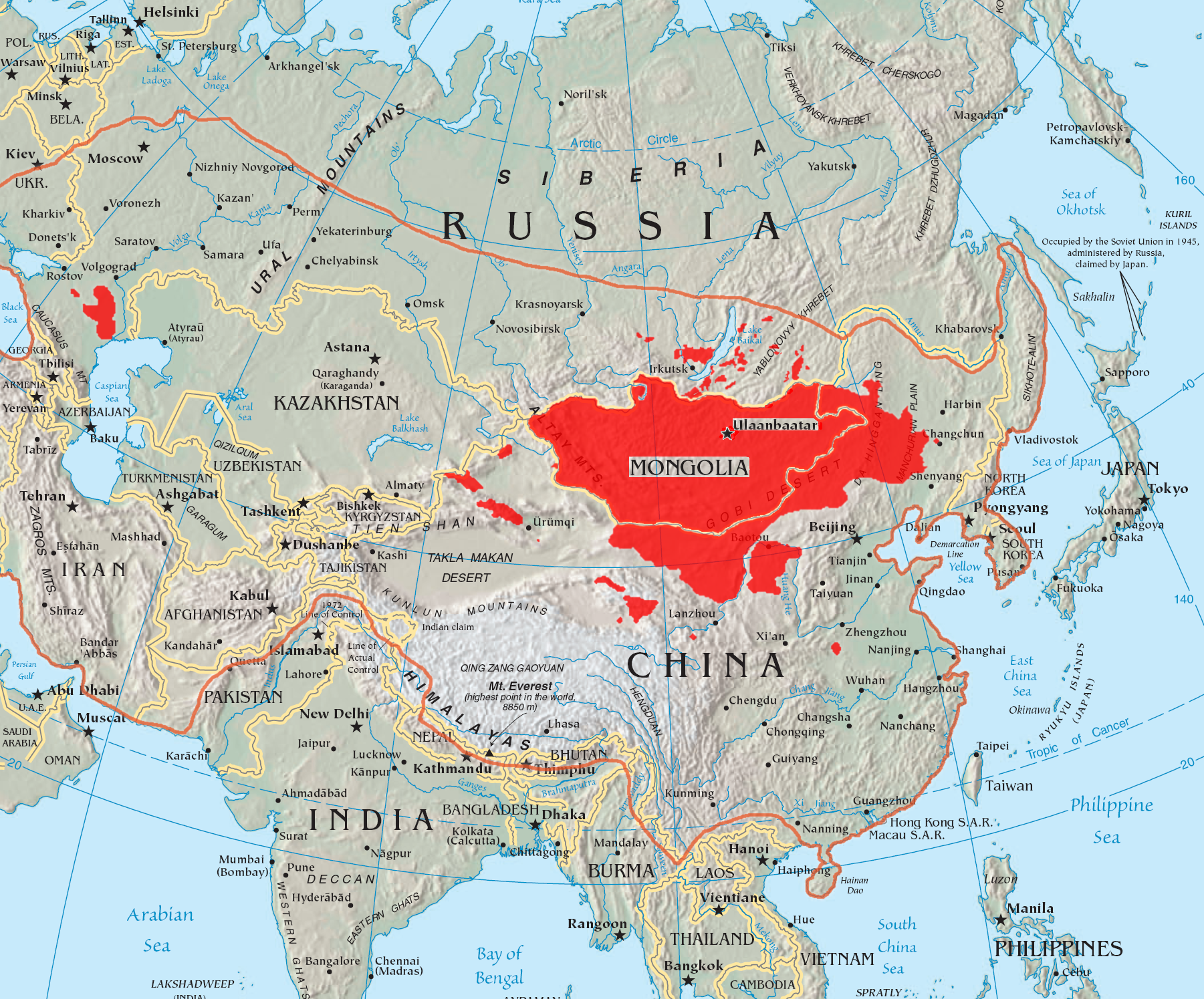
Map showing the boundary of the 13th-century Mongol Empire compared to today's Mongols

During the Tang dynasty, China exerted its greatest influence on East Asia as various aspects of Chinese culture spread to Japan and Korea. The establishment of the medieval Tang dynasty rekindled the impetus of Chinese expansionism across the geopolitical confines of East Asia. Similar to its Han predecessor, Tang China reasserted itself as the center of East Asian geopolitical influence during the early medieval period which spearheaded and marked another golden age in Chinese history. In addition, Tang China also managed to maintain control over northern Vietnam and northern Korea.

As full-fledged medieval East Asian states were established, Korea by the fourth century AD and Japan by the seventh century AD, Japan and Korea actively began to incorporate Chinese influences such as Confucianism, the use of Chinese characters, architecture, state institutions, political philosophies, religion, urban planning, and various scientific and technological methods into their culture and society through direct contacts with Tang China and succeeding Chinese dynasties. Drawing inspiration from the Tang political system, Prince Naka no Ōe launched the Taika Reform in 645 AD where he radically transformed Japan's political bureaucracy into a more centralized bureaucratic empire. The Japanese also adopted Mahayana Buddhism, Chinese style architecture, and the imperial court's rituals and ceremonies, including the orchestral music and state dances had Tang influences. Written Chinese gained prestige and aspects of Tang culture such as poetry, calligraphy, and landscape painting became widespread. During the Nara period, Japan began to aggressively import Chinese culture and styles of government which included Confucian protocol that served as a foundation for Japanese culture as well as political and social philosophy. The Japanese created laws adopted from the Chinese legal system that was used to govern in addition to the traditional kimono, which was inspired from Chinese traditional hanfu during the 8th century.

=== Modern era ===
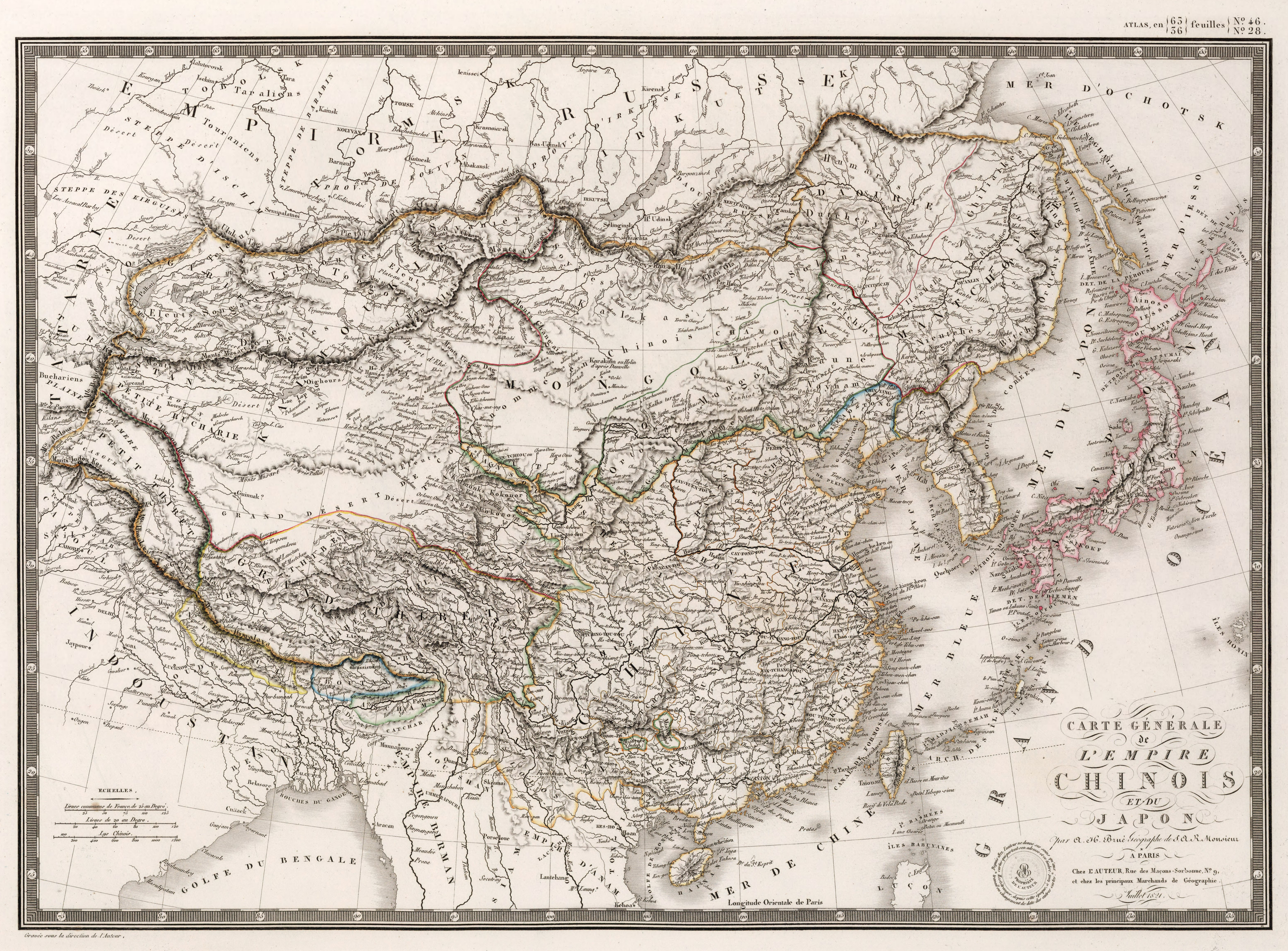
A 17th-century-map showing Qing China and Tokugawa Japan

For many centuries, most notably from the 7th to the 14th centuries, China stood as East Asia's most advanced civilization and foremost military and economic power, exerting its influence as the transmission of advanced Chinese cultural practices and ways of thinking greatly shaped the region up until the 19th century. From the 3rd century through the 18th century, diplomatic and trade relations between China and other East Asian countries and the steppe kingdoms was governed through a tributary system. Under this system, the Chinese emperor received tribute from other rulers and in return received political benefits (like recognition or non-aggression agreements) or physical gifts, like porcelain and silks. Through this system, the Chinese emperor conferred legitimacy on other rulers.

As East Asia's connections with Europe and the Western world strengthened during the late 19th century, China's power began to decline. By the mid-19th century, the weakening Qing dynasty became fraught with political corruption, obstacles and stagnation that was incapable of rejuvenating itself as a world power in contrast to the industrializing Imperial European colonial powers and a rapidly modernizing Japan. The United States Commodore Matthew C. Perry would open Japan to Western influence, and the country would expand in earnest after the 1860s. Around the same time, the Meiji Restoration in Japan sparked rapid societal transformation from an isolated feudal state into East Asia's first industrialised nation. The modern and militarily powerful Japan would galvanise its position in the Orient as East Asia's greatest power with a global mission poised to advance to lead the entire world. By the early 1900s, the Empire of Japan succeeded in asserting itself as East Asia's most dominant geopolitical force.

Colonies and spheres of influence in East Asia and Oceania, circa 1914

With its newly found international status, Japan began to challenge the European colonial powers and took on a more active role within the East Asian geopolitical order and world affairs at large. Flexing its political and military might, Japan soundly defeated the Qing dynasty during the First Sino-Japanese War as well as defeating Russia in the Russo-Japanese War in 1905; the first major military victory in the modern era of an East Asian power over a European one.

During World War I, European military presence in East Asia decreased. Japan viewed this as an opportunity to increase its power in China and shortly after the war began, occupied Germany's concessions in Shandong. In December 1914, Japan made its Twenty-One Demands to China. The Republic of China under Yuan Shikai conceded to most of the demands in 1915, and subsequent treaties and agreements further increased Japan's semi-colonial power in China.

Japan hegemony was the heart of an empire that would include Taiwan and Korea. During World War II, Japanese expansionism with its imperialist aspirations through the Greater East Asia Co-Prosperity Sphere would incorporate Korea, Taiwan, much of eastern China and Manchuria, Hong Kong, and Southeast Asia under its control establishing itself as a maritime colonial power in East Asia.

=== Contemporary era ===
After a century of exploitation by the European and Japanese colonialists, post-colonial East Asia saw the defeat and occupation of Japan by the victorious Allies. The end of World War II did not result in east Asian countries obtaining independence or national unification. Independence and national unification were primary concerns for the first generation of east Asian post-World War II leaders.

The Chinese Civil War resumed after the defeat of the Japanese, with the Communists defeating the Nationalist Republic of China government. The government of the Republic of China retreated to Taiwan and the People's Republic of China was proclaimed on 1 October 1949.

Post-war, the Korean peninsula was partitioned, leading to the development of the Democratic People's Republic of Korea (North Korea) and the Republic of Korea (South Korea). The Korean War (1950–1953) increased regional and international tensions. The northeast part of East Asia hardened along communist and anti-communist lines. South Korea, Taiwan, and the United States have increased their ties.

During the latter half of the 20th century, the region would see the post war economic miracle of Japan, which ushered in three decades of unprecedented growth, only to experience an economic slowdown during the 1990s, but nonetheless Japan continues to remain a global economic power. East Asia would also see the economic rise of Hong Kong, South Korea, and Taiwan, in addition to the respective handovers of Hong Kong and Macau near the end of the 20th century.

The onset of the 21st century in East Asia led to the integration of China into the global economy through its entry in the World Trade Organization while also enhancing its emerging international status as a potential world power reinforced with its aim of restoring its historical established significance and enduring international prominence in the world economy.

As of at least 2022, the region is more peaceful, integrated, wealthy, and stable than at any time in the previous 150 years.

== Definitions ==
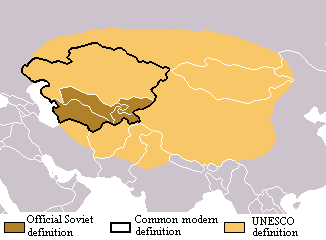
Three sets of possible boundaries for the Central Asia region that overlap with conceptions of East Asia

In common usage, the term "East Asia" typically refers to a region including Greater China, Japan, Korea and Mongolia.

China, Japan, and Korea represent the three core countries and civilizations of traditional East Asia, as they once had a shared written language, a shared culture, and a shared Confucian societal value system (involving shared Confucian philosophical tenets) once instituted by Imperial China. Other usages define China, Japan, North Korea, South Korea and Taiwan as countries that constitute East Asia based on their geographic proximity as well as historical and modern cultural and economic ties, particularly with Japan and Korea in having retained strong cultural influences that originated from China. Some scholars include Vietnam as part of East Asia as it has been considered part of the greater Chinese cultural sphere. Though Confucianism continues to play an important role in Vietnamese culture, Chinese characters are no longer used in its written language and many scholarly organizations classify Vietnam as a Southeast Asian country. Mongolia is geographically north of China yet Confucianism and the Chinese writing system and culture had limited impact on Mongolian society. Thus, Mongolia is sometimes grouped with Central Asian countries such as Turkmenistan, Kyrgyzstan, and Kazakhstan. Xinjiang and Tibet are sometimes seen as part of Central Asia (see also Greater Central Asia).

Broader and looser definitions by international agencies and organisations such as the World Bank refer to East Asia as the "three major Northeast Asian economies, i.e. China, Japan, and South Korea", as well as Mongolia, North Korea, the Russian Far East, and Siberia. The Council on Foreign Relations includes the Russia Far East, Mongolia, and Nepal. The World Bank also acknowledges the roles of Chinese special administrative regions Hong Kong and Macau, as well as Taiwan, a country with limited recognition. The Economic Research Institute for Northeast Asia defines the region as "China, Japan, the Koreas, Nepal, Mongolia, and eastern regions of the Russian Federation".

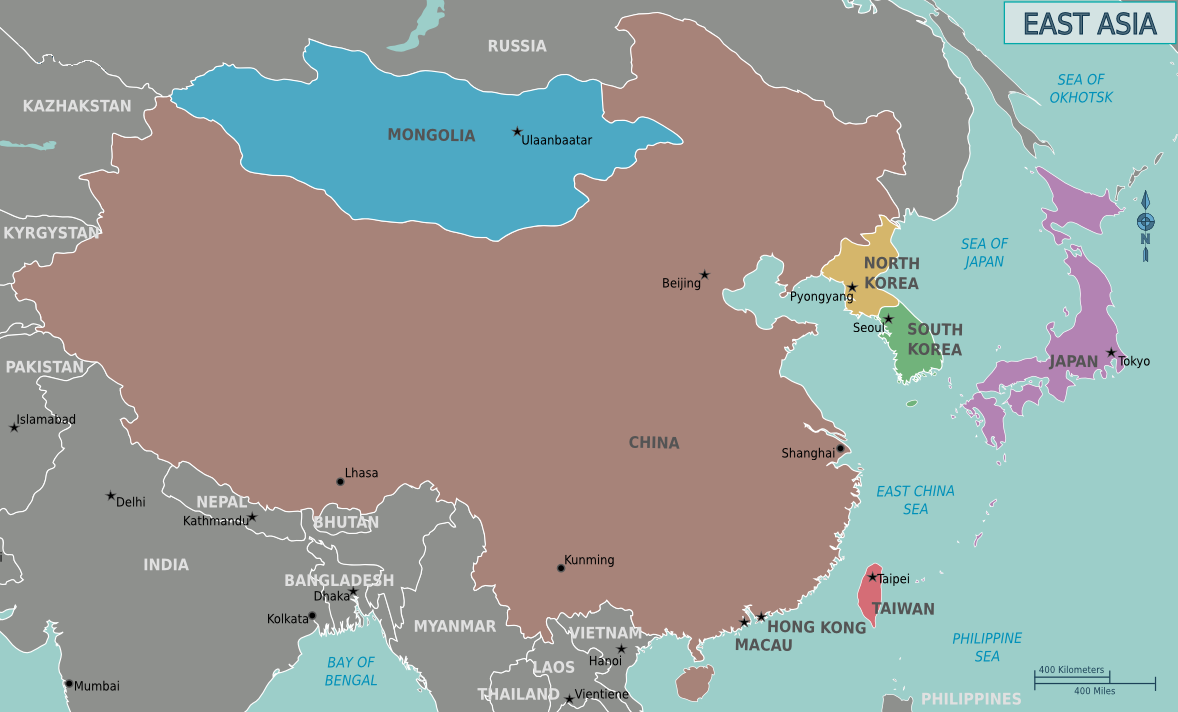
Map of East Asia

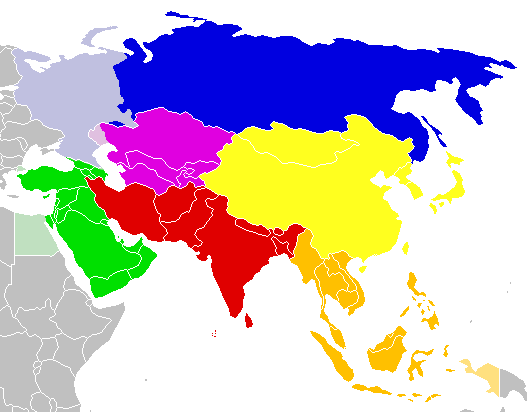
The United Nations Statistics Division (UNSD) geoscheme for Asia works with subregions defined in terms of UN political geography statistics. The UNSD geoscheme is based on statistic convenience rather than implying any assumption regarding political or other affiliation of countries or territories: North Asia Central Asia Western Asia South Asia East Asia Southeast Asia

The UNSD definition of East Asia is based on statistical convenience, but others commonly use the same definition of China, Hong Kong, Macau, Mongolia, North Korea, South Korea, Taiwan, and Japan.

Certain Japanese islands are associated with Oceania due to non-continental geology, distance from mainland Asia or biogeographical similarities with Micronesia. Some groups, such as the World Health Organization, categorize China, Japan and Korea with Australia and the rest of Oceania. The World Health Organization label this region the "Western Pacific", with East Asia not being used in their concept of major world regions. Their definition of this region further includes Mongolia and the adjacent area of Cambodia, as well as the countries of the Southeast Asia Archipelago (excluding East Timor, Thailand, Myanmar and Indonesia).

=== Alternative definitions ===
In the context of business and economics, "East Asia" is sometimes used to refer to the geographical area covering ten Southeast Asian countries in ASEAN, Greater China, Japan, and Korea. However, in this context, the term "Far East" is used by the Europeans to cover ASEAN countries and the countries in East Asia. On rare occasions, the term is also sometimes taken to include India and other South Asian countries that are not situated within the bounds of the Asia-Pacific, although the term Indo-Pacific is more commonly used for such a definition.

Observers preferring a broader definition of "East Asia" often use the term Northeast Asia to refer to China, the Korean Peninsula, and Japan, with the region of Southeast Asia covering the ten ASEAN countries. This usage, which is seen in economic and diplomatic discussions, is at odds with the historical meanings of both "East Asia" and "Northeast Asia". The Council on Foreign Relations of the United States defines Northeast Asia as Japan and Korea.

== Climate ==
East Asia map of Köppen climate classification.

East Asia is home to many climatic zones. It also has unique weather patterns such as the East Asian rainy season and the East Asian Monsoon.

=== Climate change ===
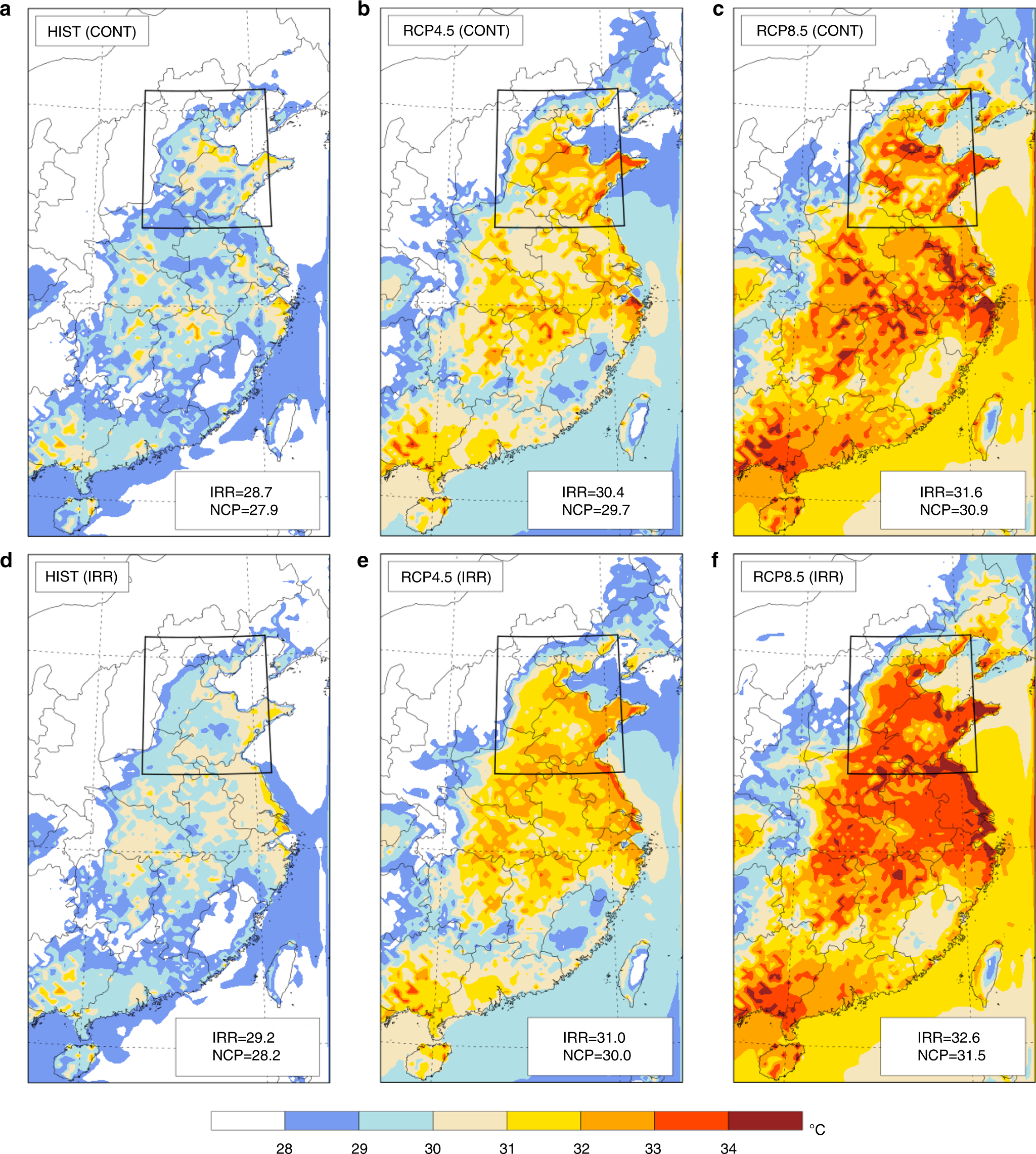
Climate change is expected to exacerbate heat stress over at the North China Plain, which is particularly vulnerable as widespread irrigation results in very moist air. There is a risk that agricultural labourers will be physically unable to work outdoors on hot summer days at the end of the century, particularly under the scenario of greatest emissions and warming.

Like the rest of the world, East Asia has been getting warmer due to climate change, and there had been a measurable increase in the frequency and severity of heatwaves. The region is also expected to see the intensification of its monsoon, leading to more flooding. China has notably embarked on the sponge cities program, where cities are designed to increase the area of urban green spaces and permeable pavings in order to help deal with flash floods caused by greater precipitation extremes. Under high-warming scenarios, "critical health thresholds" for heat stress during the 21st century will be at times breached, in areas like the North China Plain.

China, Japan and the Republic of Korea are expected to see some of the largest economic losses caused by sea level rise. The city of Guangzhou is projected to experience the single largest annual economic losses from sea level rise in the world, potentially reaching US$254 million by 2050. Under the highest climate change scenario and in the absence of adaptation, cumulative economic losses caused by sea level rise in Guangzhou would exceed US$1 trillion by 2100. Shanghai is also expected to experience annual losses of around 1% of the local GDP in the absence of adaptation. The Yangtze River basin is a sensitive and biodiverse ecosystem, yet around 20% of its species may be lost throughout the century under 2 °C (3.6 °F) and ~43% under 4.5 °C (8.1 °F).

== Economy ==
Customs territory	GDP nominal millions of USD (2026)	GDP nominal per capita USD (2026)	GDP PPP millions of USD (2026)	GDP PPP per capita USD (2026)
China	20,851,593	14,874	44,295,453	31,596
Hong Kong (Note: Listed as "Hong Kong SAR" by IMF)	450,138	59,640	635,594	84,212
Macau (Note: Listed as "Macao SAR" by IMF)	54,228	76,446	99,611	140,423
Japan	4,379,253	35,703	7,262,163	59,207
Mongolia	28,450	7,853	80,398	22,192
North Korea (Note: Bank of Korea estimates)	28,804 (Note: Bank of Korea estimates)	1,082 (Note: Bank of Korea estimates)	N/A	N/A
South Korea	1,931,008	37,412	3,540,952	68,624
Taiwan (Note: Listed as "Taiwan, Province of China" by IMF)	976,719	42,103	2,274,626	98,051
East Asia	$28,700,193	$17,395	$58,188,797	$35,303

== Territorial and regional data ==
China, North Korea, South Korea, and Taiwan are all unrecognised by at least one other East Asian state because of severe ongoing political tensions in the region, specifically the division of Korea and the political status of Taiwan.

=== Etymology ===
Common Name		Official name		ISO 3166 Country Codes			
Exonym	Endonym	Exonym	Endonym	ISO Short Name	Alpha-2 Code	Alpha-3 Code	Numeric
China	中国	People's Republic of China	中华人民共和国	China	CN	CHN	156
Hong Kong	香港	Hong Kong Special Administrative Region of the People's Republic of China	中華人民共和國香港特別行政區	Hong Kong	HK	HKG	344
Macau	澳門	Macao Special Administrative Region of the People's Republic of China	中華人民共和國澳門特別行政區	Macao	MO	MAC	446
Japan	日本	Japan	日本国	Japan	JP	JPN	392
Mongolia	Монгол улс / ᠮᠣᠩᠭᠣᠯ ᠤᠯᠤᠰ	Mongolia	Монгол Улс (ᠮᠣᠩᠭᠣᠯ ᠤᠯᠤᠰ)	Mongolia	MN	MNG	496
North Korea	조선	Democratic People's Republic of Korea	조선민주주의인민공화국	Korea (the Democratic People's Republic of)	KP	PRK	408
South Korea	한국	Republic of Korea	대한민국	Korea (the Republic of)	KR	KOR	410
Taiwan	臺灣 / 台灣	Republic of China	中華民國	Taiwan (Province of China)	TW	TWN	158

== Demographics ==
Population pyramid of East Asia in 2023

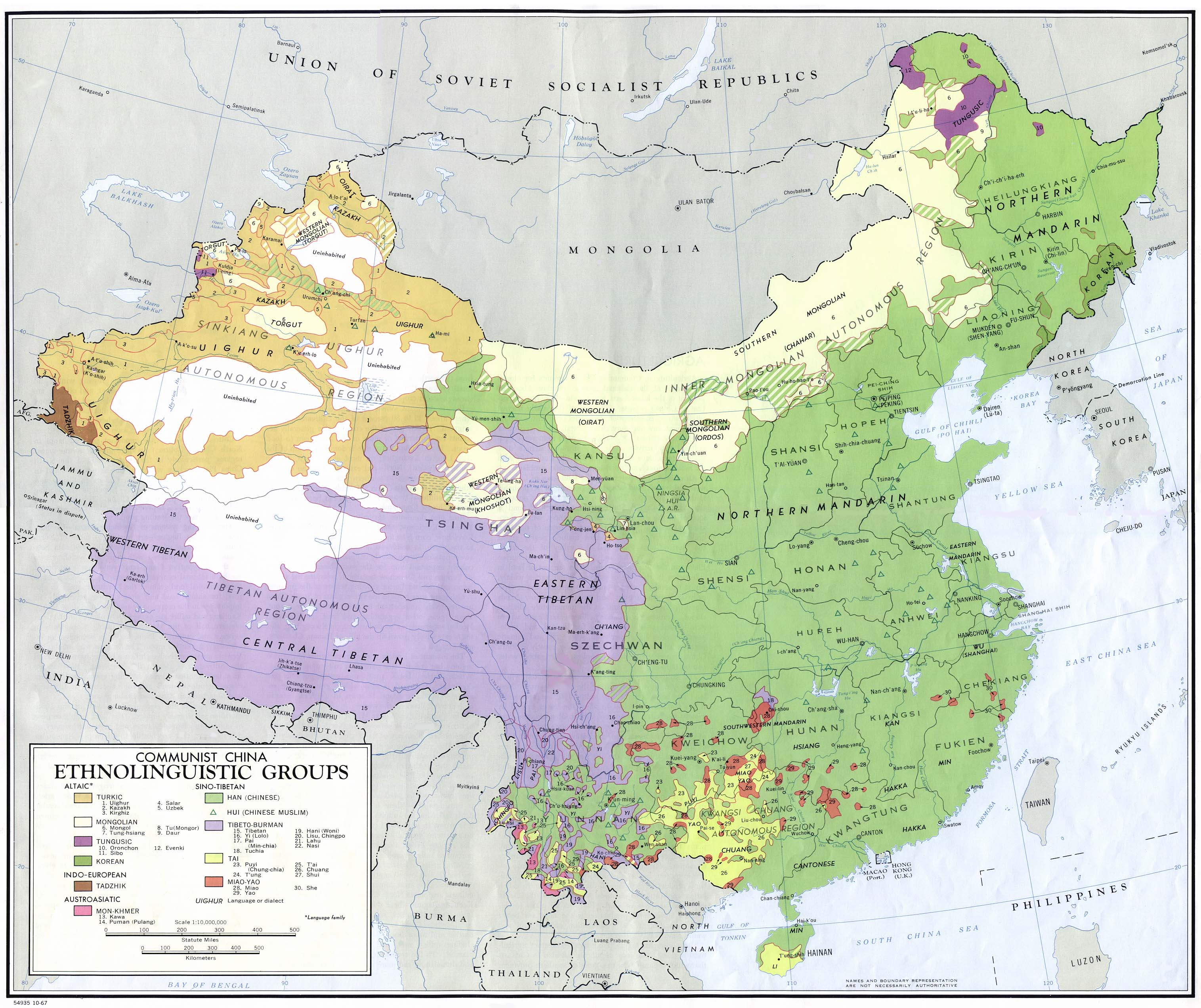
Historical distribution map of linguistic groups in China

State/Territory	Area km^{2}	Population in thousands (2023)	% of East Asia	% of World	Population density per km^{2}	HDI	Capital
China	9,640,011 (Note: Includes all area which under PRC's government control (excluding "South Tibet" and disputed islands).)	1,425,671 (Note: A note by the United Nations: "For statistical purposes, the data for China do not include Hong Kong and Macao, Special Administrative Regions (SAR) of China, and Taiwan Province of China.")	85.76%	17.72%	138	0.788	Beijing
Hong Kong	1,104	7,492	0.45%	0.093%	6,390	0.956	—N/a
Macau	30	704	0.042%	0.0087%	18,662	0.925	—N/a
Japan	377,930	123,295	7.42%	1.53%	337	0.920	Tokyo
Mongolia	1,564,100	3,447	0.2%	0.042%	2	0.741	Ulaanbaatar
North Korea	120,538	26,161	1.57%	0.33%	198	0.733	Pyongyang
South Korea	100,210	51,784	3.11%	0.64%	500	0.929	Seoul
Taiwan	36,197	23,923	1.44%	0.297%	639	0.926	Taipei
East Asia	11,840,000	1,662,477	100%	20.66%	141		

=== Religion ===
Religion in East Asia (est. 2020)
1. No religion (52.0%)
2. Folk religion (19.7%)
3. Buddhism (19.4%)
4. Christianity (5.71%)
5. Islam (1.76%)
6. Other (1.38%)

Religion	Founded Time	Ethnic groups
Chinese folk religion	Prehistoric period	Han, Hmong, Qiang, Tujia (worship of the same ancestor-gods)
Taoism	125 AD Eastern Han dynasty	Zhengyi, Quanzhen
East Asian Buddhism/Chinese Buddhism	67 AD Eastern Han dynasty	Han, Koreans, Yamato
Tibetan Buddhism	1800 years ago	Tibetans, Manchus, Mongols
Shamanism	Prehistoric period	Manchus, Mongols, Oroqens
Shinto	Yayoi period	Yamato
Korean shamanism	—N/a	Koreans
Ryukyuan religion	—N/a	Ryukyuans

=== Ethnic groups ===
Ethnicity	Population	Language(s)	Writing system(s)	Major states/territories*	Traditional attire
Han/Chinese	1,313,345,856	Chinese (Mandarin, Min, Wu, Yue, Jin, Gan, Hakka, Xiang, Huizhou, Pinghua, etc.)	Simplified Han characters, Traditional Han characters	(China) ( (Hong Kong) (Macau) ) (Taiwan)	
Yamato/Japanese	125,117,000	Japanese	Han characters (Kanji), Katakana, Hiragana	(Japan)	
Korean	84,790,105	Korean	Hangul, Han characters (Hanja)	(South Korea) (North Korea)	
Bai	2,091,543	Bai, Southwestern Mandarin	Simplified characters, Latin script	(China)	
Hui	11,377,914	Northwestern Mandarin, other Chinese Dialects, Huihui language, etc.	Simplified characters	(China)	
Mongols	8,942,528	Mongolian	Mongol script, Cyrillic script	(China) (Mongolia)	
Zhuang	19,568,546	Zhuang, Southwestern Mandarin, etc.	Simplified Han characters, Latin script	(China)	
Uyghurs	11,774,538	Uyghur	Arabic alphabet, Latin script	(China)	
Manchus	10,423,303	Northeastern Mandarin, Manchu language	Simplified Han characters, Mongol script	(China) (Taiwan)	
Hmong/Miao	11,067,929	Hmong/Miao, Southwestern Mandarin	Latin script, Simplified Han characters	(China)	
Tibetans	7,060,731	Tibetan, Rgyal Rong, Rgu, etc.	Tibetan script	(China)	
Yi	9,830,327	Various Loloish, Southwestern Mandarin	Yi script, Simplified Han characters	(China)	
Tujia	9,587,732	Northern Tujia, Southern Tujia	Simplified Han characters	(China)	
Kam	3,495,993	Gaeml	Simplified Han characters, Latin script	(China)	
Tu	289,565	Tu, Northwestern Mandarin	Simplified Han characters	(China)	
Daur	131,992	Daur, Northeastern Mandarin	Mongol script, Simplified Han characters	(China) (Mongolia)	
Indigenous Taiwanese	533,600	Austronesian languages (Amis, Yami), etc.	Latin script, Traditional Han characters	(Taiwan)	
Ryukyuan	1,900,000	Japanese; Ryukyuan	Han characters (Kanji), Katakana, Hiragana	(Japan)	
Ainu	200,000	Japanese; Ainu	Ainu uses both the Katakana and Latin scripts	(Japan)	

- Note: The order of states/territories follows the population ranking of each ethnicity, within East Asia only.

== Culture ==
The culture of East Asia, has been deeply influenced by China, as it was the civilization that had the most dominant influence in the region throughout the ages that ultimately laid the foundation for East Asian civilization. The vast knowledge and ingenuity of Chinese civilization and the classics of Chinese literature and culture were seen as the foundations for a civilized life in East Asia. Imperial China served as a vehicle through which the adoption of Confucian ethical philosophy, Chinese calendar system, political and legal systems, architectural style, diet, terminology, institutions, religious beliefs, imperial examinations that emphasised a knowledge of Chinese classics, political philosophy and cultural value systems, as well as historically sharing a common writing system reflected in the histories of Japan and Korea.

The Imperial Chinese tributary system was the bedrock of network of trade and foreign relations between China and its East Asian tributaries, which helped to shape much of East Asian affairs during the ancient and medieval eras. Through the tributary system, the various dynasties of Imperial China facilitated frequent economic and cultural exchange that influenced the cultures of Japan and Korea and drew them into a Chinese international order. The Imperial Chinese tributary system shaped much of East Asia's foreign policy and trade for over two millennia due to Imperial China's economic and cultural dominance over the region, and thus played a huge role in the history of East Asia in particular. The relationship between China and its cultural influence on East Asia has been compared to the historical influence of Greco-Roman civilization on classical Western civilisation.

Since the late 19th century, the initially unequal encounter with Western influences has also shaped East Asia, primarily in Japan, South Korea, and Taiwan.

=== Festivals ===
Festival	Native name	Calendar	Date	Major ethnicities
Chinese New Year	農曆新年/农历新年 or 春節/春节	Chinese	First day of the first lunisolar month	Han, Manchus etc.
Korean New Year	설날 or 설	Korean	First day of the first lunisolar month	Koreans
Losar or Tsagaan Sar	藏历新年/ལོ་གསར་ or 查干萨日/Цагаан сар	Tibetan, Mongolian	First day of the lunisolar Tibetan calendar	Tibetans, Mongols, Tu etc.
New Year	元旦	Gregorian	1 January	—N/a
Lantern Festival	元宵節 or 元宵节	Chinese	15th day of the first lunisolar month	Han
Daeboreum	대보름 or 정월 대보름	Korean	First full moon of the lunar year	Korean
Hanshi Festival	寒食節 or 寒食节 or Ханш нээх	Solar term	Traditionally, on the 105th day after the Winter solstice. Revised to 1 day before the Qingming Festival by Johann Adam Schall von Bell (Chinese: 汤若望) during the Qing dynasty.	Han, Koreans, Mongols
Qingming Festival	清明節 or 清明节	Solar term	15th day after the Vernal Equinox. Just 1 day after the Hanshi Festival, but in much higher repute.	Han, Koreans, Mongols
Dragon Boat Festival	端午節 or 端午节 or 단오	Chinese / Korean	Fifth day of the fifth month of the lunisolar calendar	Han, Koreans, Yamato
Ghost Festival	中元節 or 中元节 or 백중	Chinese	15th day of the 7th lunisolar month	Han, Koreans, Yamato
Mid-Autumn Festival	中秋節 or 中秋节	Chinese	15th day of the 8th lunisolar month	Han
Chuseok	추석 or 한가위	Korean	14th to 16th of the 8th lunisolar month	Koreans
Tsukimi	月見 or お月見	Gregorian (Note: Japan switched the date to the Gregorian calendar after the Meiji Restoration.)	15th to 18th of the 8th lunisolar month	Yamato
Double Ninth Festival	重陽節 or 重阳节	Chinese	9th day of the 9th lunisolar month	Han, Korean, Yamato
Lower Yuan Festival	下元節 or 下元节	Chinese	Month 10 Day 15	Han
Winter Solstice Festival	冬至 or 동지 or 冬至	Gregorian	December solstice	Han, Koreans, Yamato
Small New Year	小年	Chinese	Month 12 Day 23	Han, Mongols

=== Entertainment ===
East Asian popular culture, such as anime and manga from Japan and K-pop and K-dramas from South Korea, have become highly popular worldwide in the 21st century.

=== Sports ===
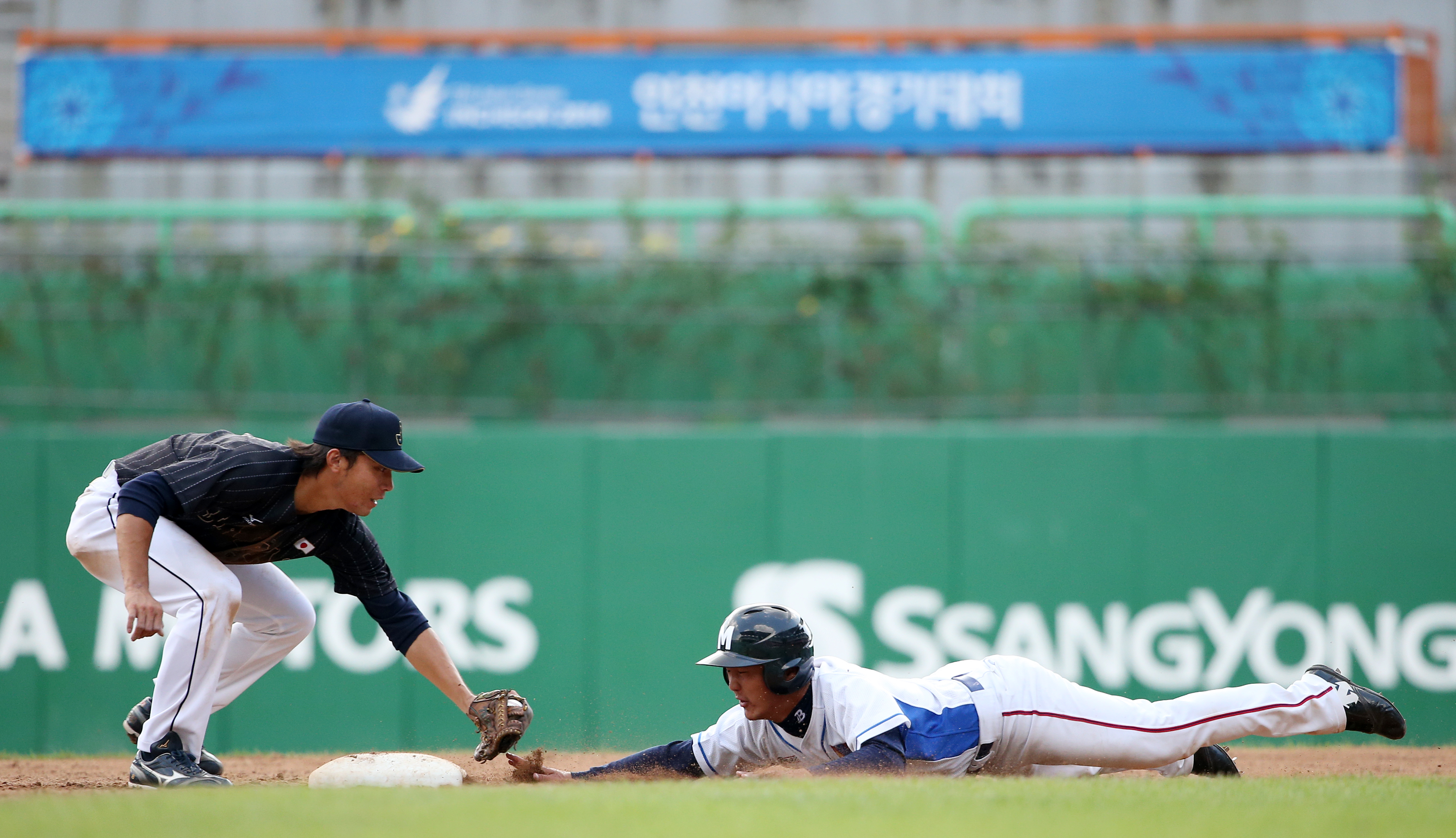
Japan vs. Mongolia in baseball at the 2014 Asian Games

Baseball is one of the main sports in East Asia, having been introduced through mid-19th century American contact and further spread by the Japanese Empire. The game has gained millions of fans in China since the 2010s.

In 1964, Japan was the first Asian nation to hold the Olympic Games after two unsuccessful 1940 attempts in Sapporo and Tokyo were cancelled due to World War II. 2002 saw Japan and South Korea host the FIFA World Cup, marking the first time two nations served as hosts of the competition together, as well as the first World Cup in Asia. Between 2018 and 2022, three Olympic Games were held in the region: Pyeongchang hosted the Winter Games in 2018, Tokyo held the Summer Games in 2021, and Beijing became the first city to host both Summer and Winter Olympics after hosting the Winter Games in 2022, having run the Summer Games in 2008. The Tokyo 2020 and Beijing 2022 events were significantly scaled back due to the COVID-19 pandemic, with the Tokyo Games being postponed until 2021.

==== East Asian Youth Games ====
Following the discontinuation of the East Asian Games after the 2013 edition, the East Asian Youth Games were established as their successor. Organized by the East Asian Games Association (EAGA) they are held every four years among athletes from East Asian countries and territories of the Olympic Council of Asia (OCA), as well as Guam, a member of the Oceania National Olympic Committees. Although the inaugural edition was originally scheduled for Taichung, Taiwan, in 2019, it was cancelled; the first edition to be held took place in Ulaanbaatar, Mongolia, in 2023.

It is one of five Regional Games of the OCA. The others are the Central Asian Games, the Southeast Asian Games (SEA Games), the South Asian Games, and the West Asian Games.

== Collaboration ==
=== Free trade agreements ===
Name of agreement	Parties	Leaders of the Period	Negotiation begins	Signing date	Starting time	Current status
China–South Korea FTA	(China) (South Korea)	Xi Jinping, Park Geun-hye	May, 2012	Jun 01, 2015	Dec 30, 2015	In force
China–Japan–South Korea FTA	(China) (Japan) (South Korea)	Xi Jinping, Shinzō Abe, Park Geun-hye	Mar 26, 2013	—N/a	—N/a	10 round negotiation
Japan-Mongolia EPA	(Japan) (Mongolia)	Shinzō Abe, Tsakhiagiin Elbegdorj	—	Feb 10, 2015	—	In force
China-Mongolia FTA	(China) (Mongolia)	Xi Jinping, Tsakhiagiin Elbegdorj	—N/a	—N/a	—N/a	Proposed
China-HK CEPA	(China) (Hong Kong)	Jiang Zemin, Tung Chee-hwa	—	Jun 29, 2003	—	In force
China-Macau CEPA	(China) (Macau)	Jiang Zemin, Edmund Ho Hau-wah	—	Oct 18, 2003	—	In force
Hong Kong-Macau CEPA	(Hong Kong) (Macau)	Carrie Lam, Fernando Chui	Oct 09, 2015	Oct 27, 2017	—N/a	In force
ECFA	(China) (Taiwan)	Hu Jintao, Ma Ying-jeou	Jan 26, 2010	Jun 29, 2010	Aug 17, 2010	In force
CSSTA (Based on ECFA)	(China) (Taiwan)	Xi Jinping, Ma Ying-jeou	Mar, 2011	Jun 21, 2013	—N/a	Abolished
CSGTA (Based on ECFA)	(China) (Taiwan)	Hu Jintao, Ma Ying-jeou	Feb 22, 2011	—N/a	—N/a	Suspended

=== Military alliances ===
Name	Parties within the region
Sino-North Korean Mutual Aid and Cooperation Friendship Treaty	(China) (North Korea)
Treaty of Mutual Cooperation and Security between the United States and Japan	(United States) (Japan)
Mutual Defense Treaty Between the United States and the Republic of Korea	(United States) (South Korea)

== Major cities ==
Largest population centres of East Asia
Rank	City name	Country	Pop.
1	Tokyo	Japan	38,140,000
2	Seoul	South Korea	25,520,000
3	Shanghai	China	24,484,000
4	Beijing	China	21,240,000
5	Osaka	Japan	20,337,000
6	Chongqing	China	13,744,000
7	Guangzhou	China	13,070,000
8	Tianjin	China	11,558,000
9	Shenzhen	China	10,828,000
10	Chengdu	China	10,104,000

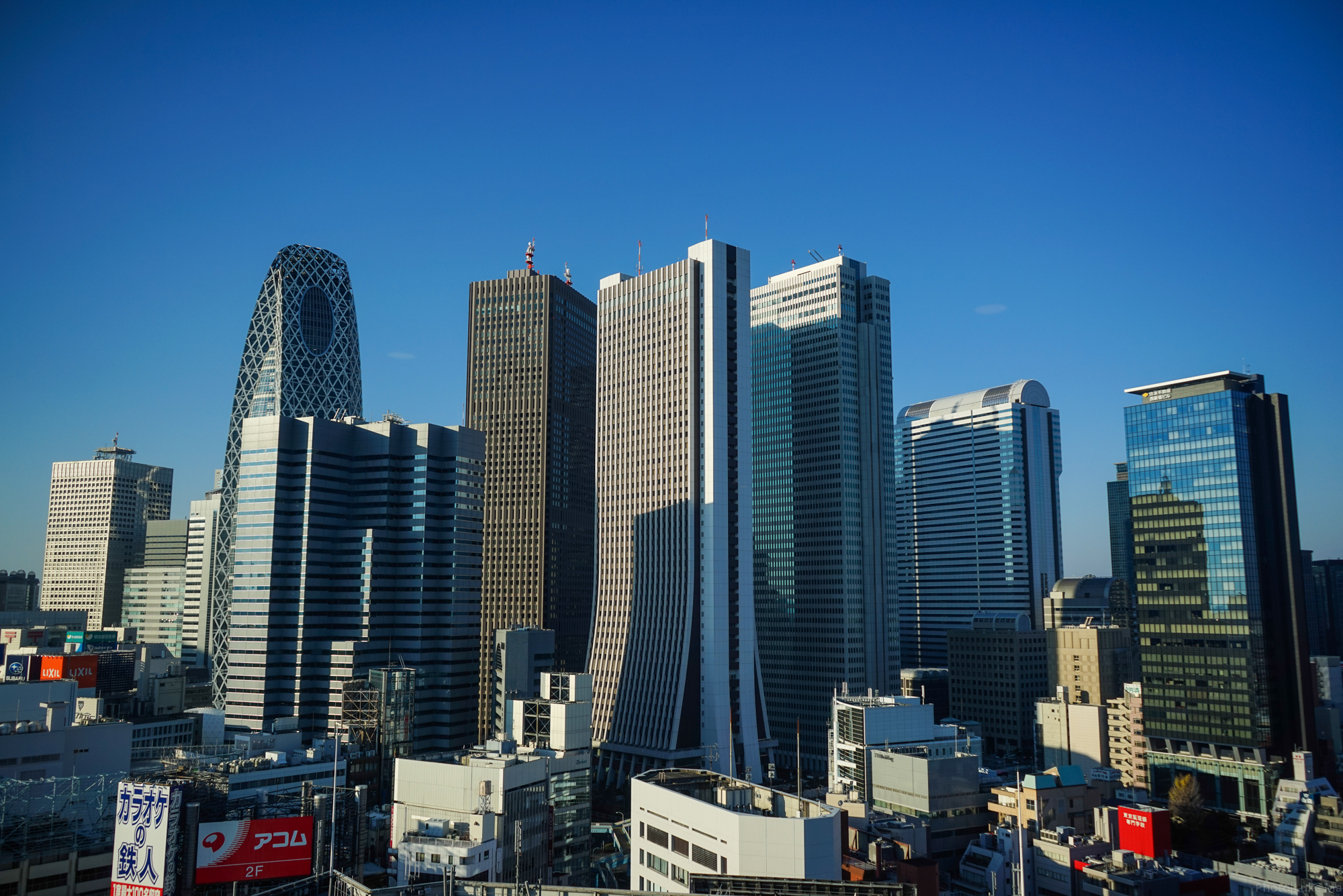
Tokyo is the capital of Japan and the world's largest metropolis, both in metropolitan population and economy.

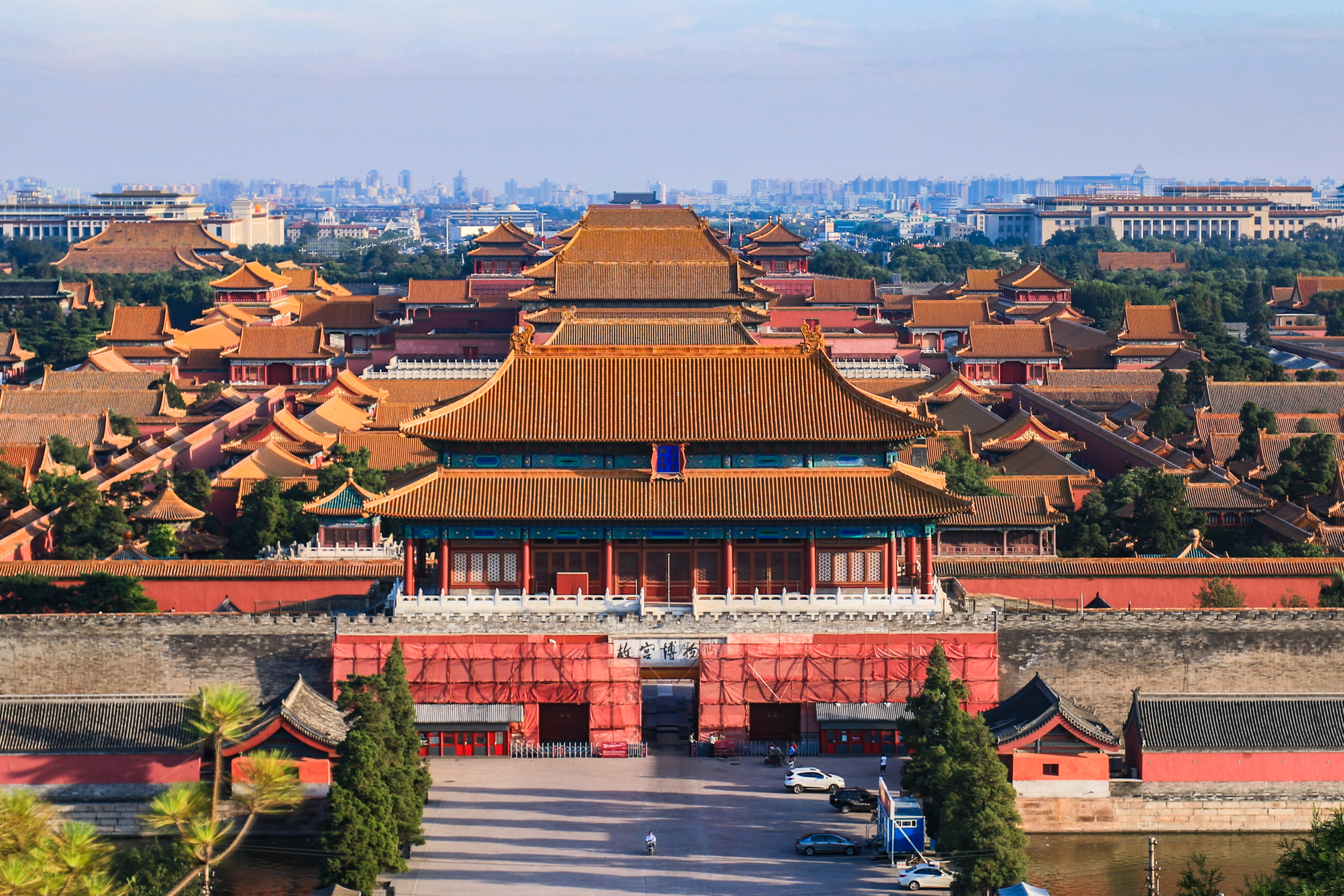
Beijing is the capital of China and has a history spanning 3300 years.

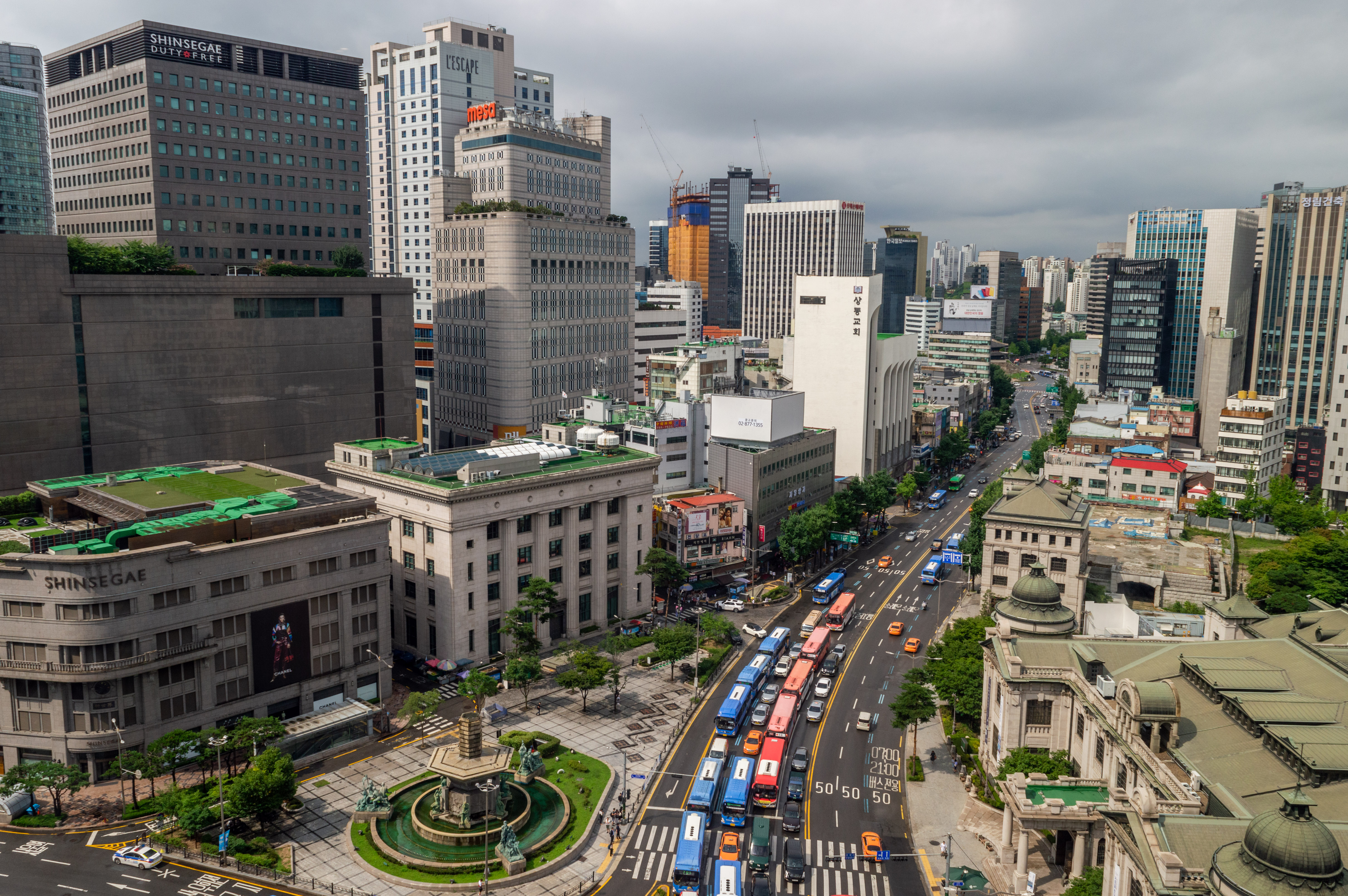
Seoul is the capital of South Korea and the Joseon Dynasty.

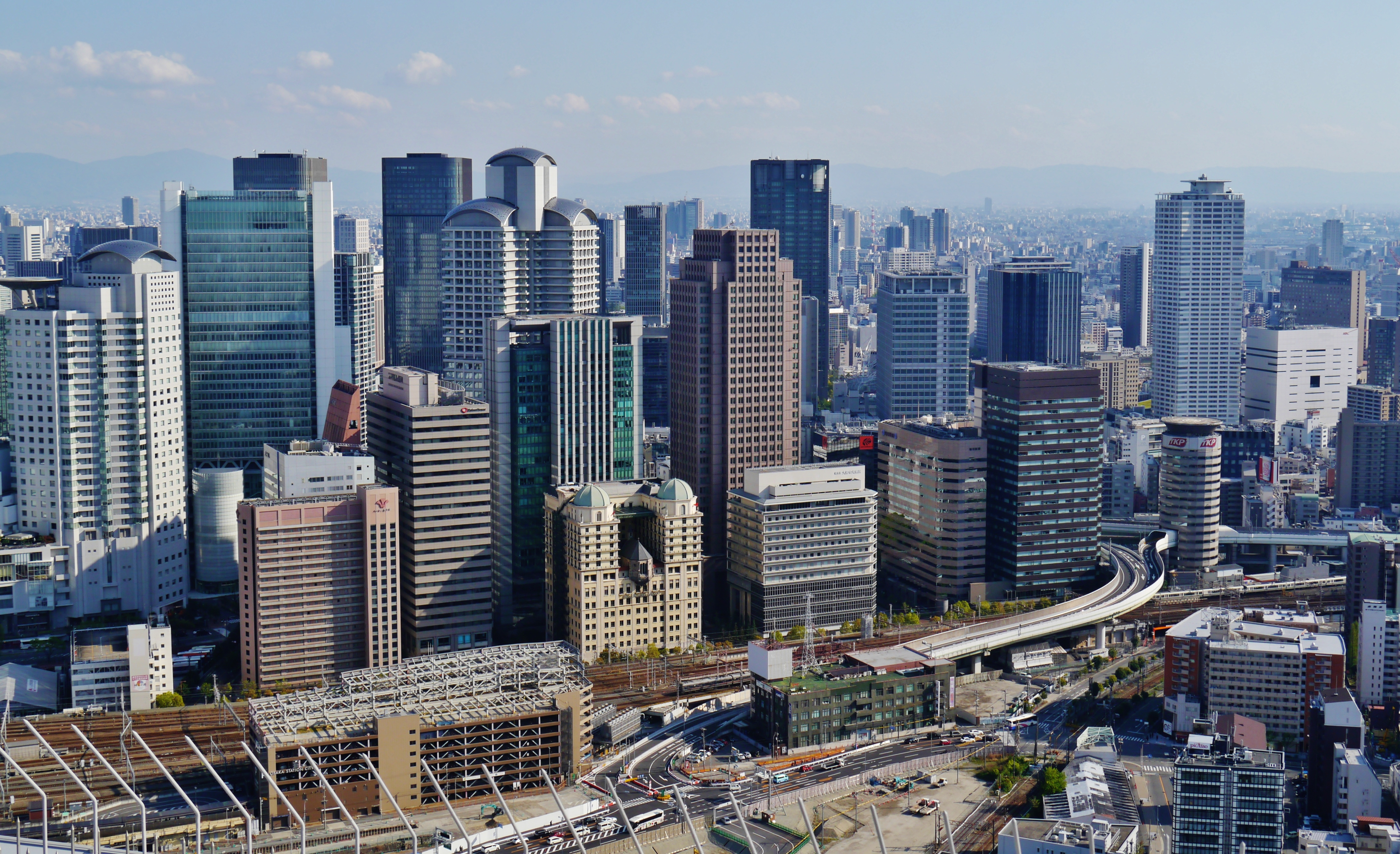
Osaka is the second-largest metropolitan area in Japan and a major industrial center.

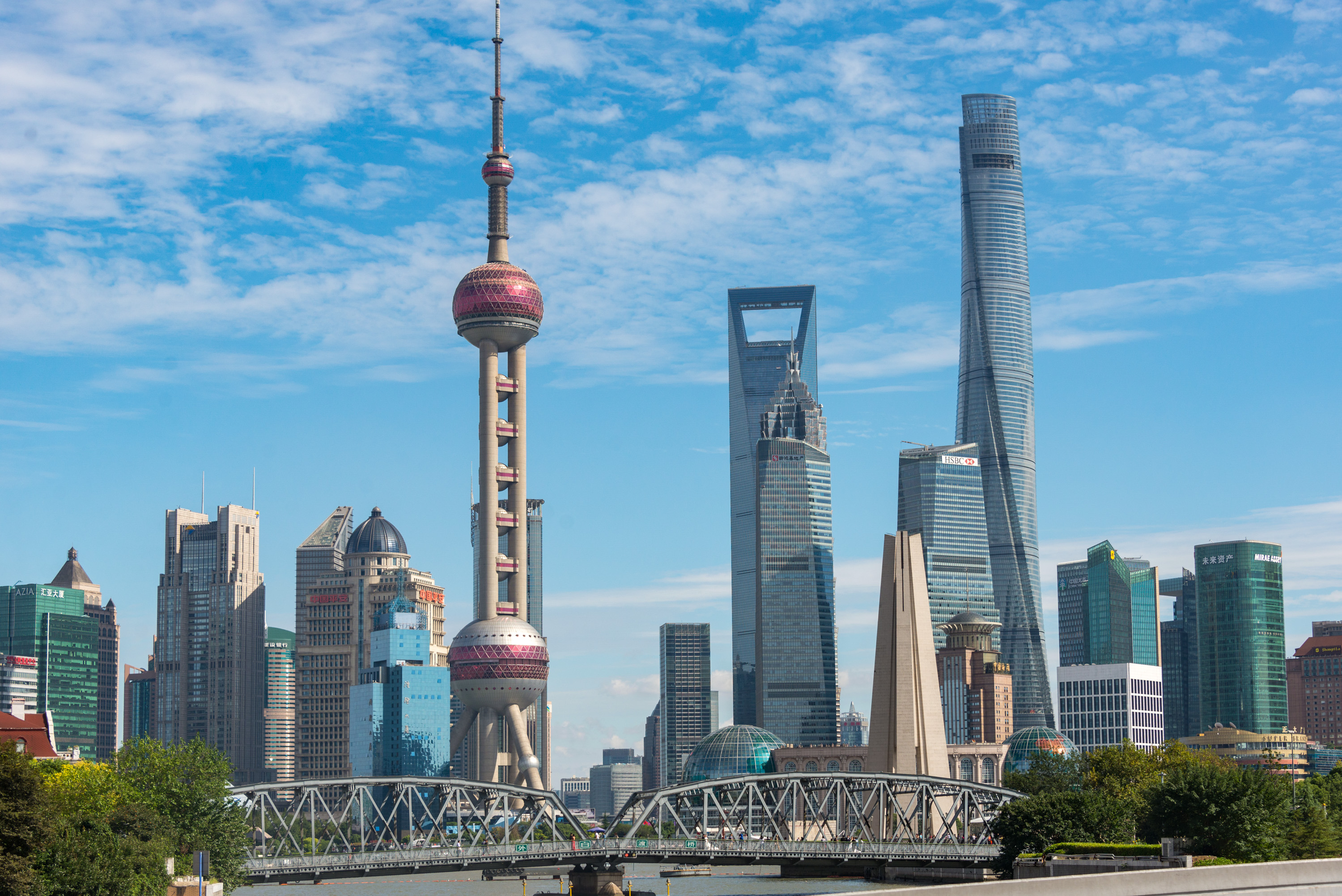
Shanghai is China's largest city and most important economic center.

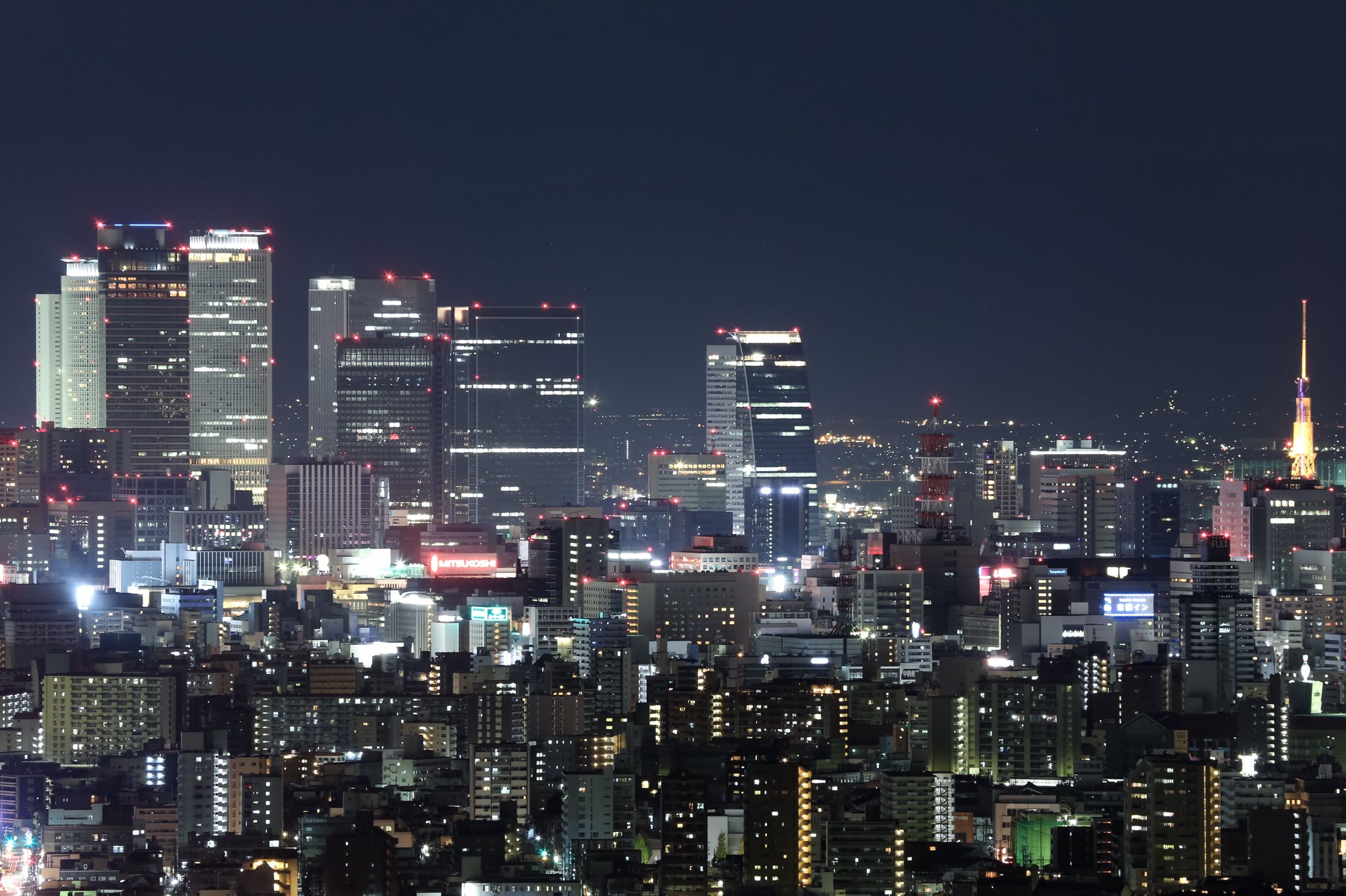
Nagoya is the third-largest metropolitan area in Japan. Nagoya is a major port city and the location of Lexus headquarters.

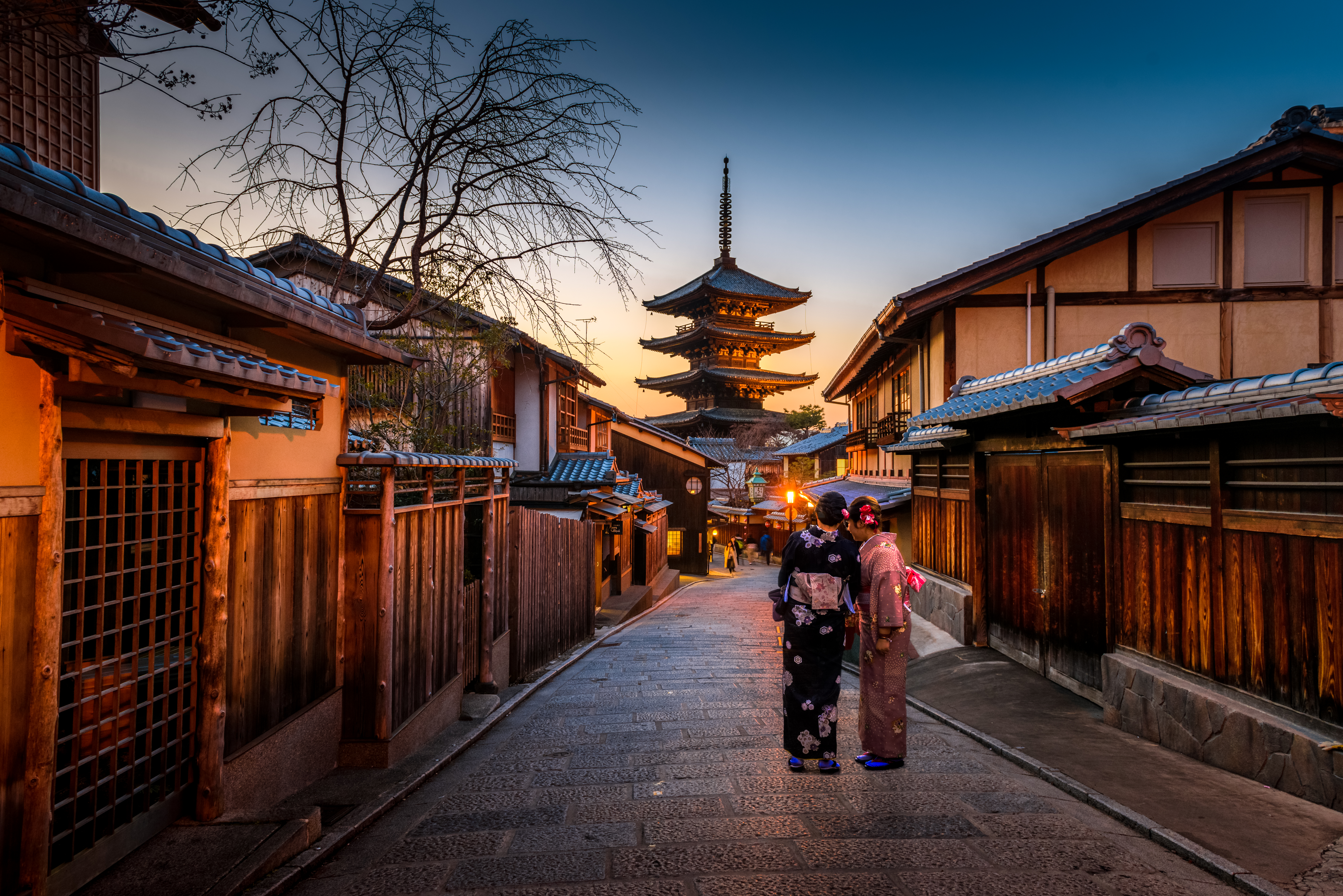
Kyoto was the imperial capital of Japan for eleven centuries.

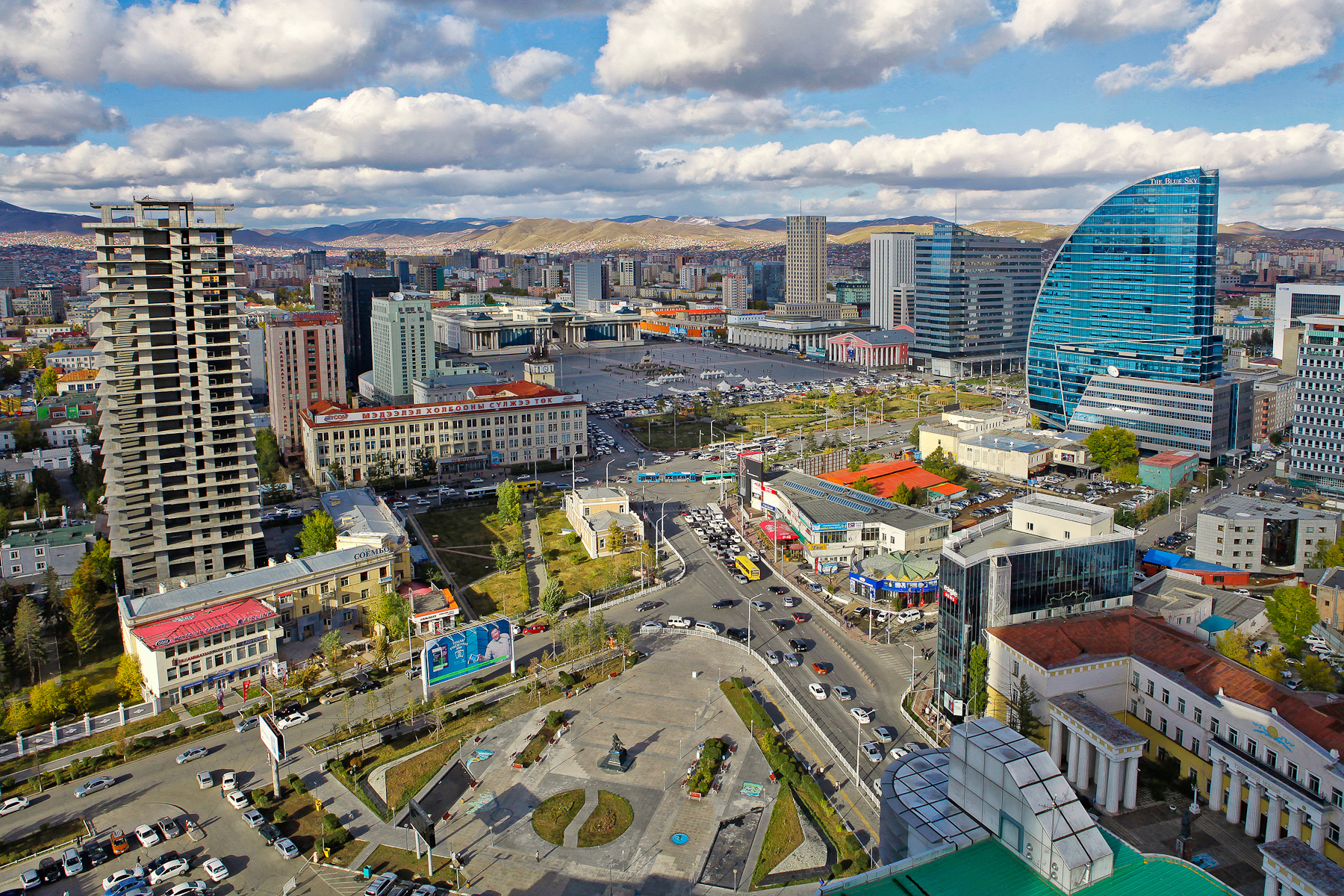
Ulaanbaatar is the capital of Mongolia, with a population of 1.6 million as of 2021.

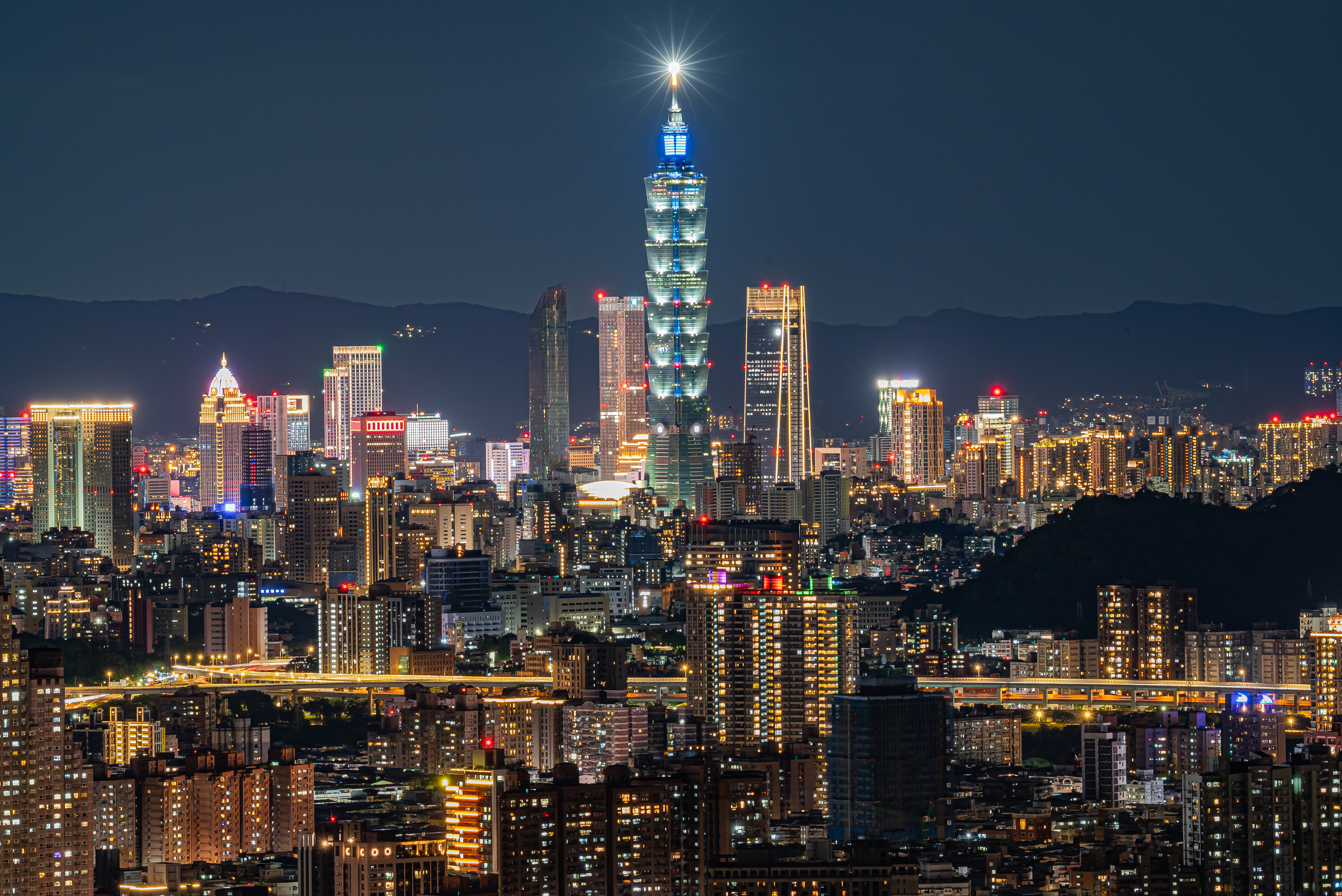
Taipei City is the capital of Taiwan, with a population of 2.6 million.

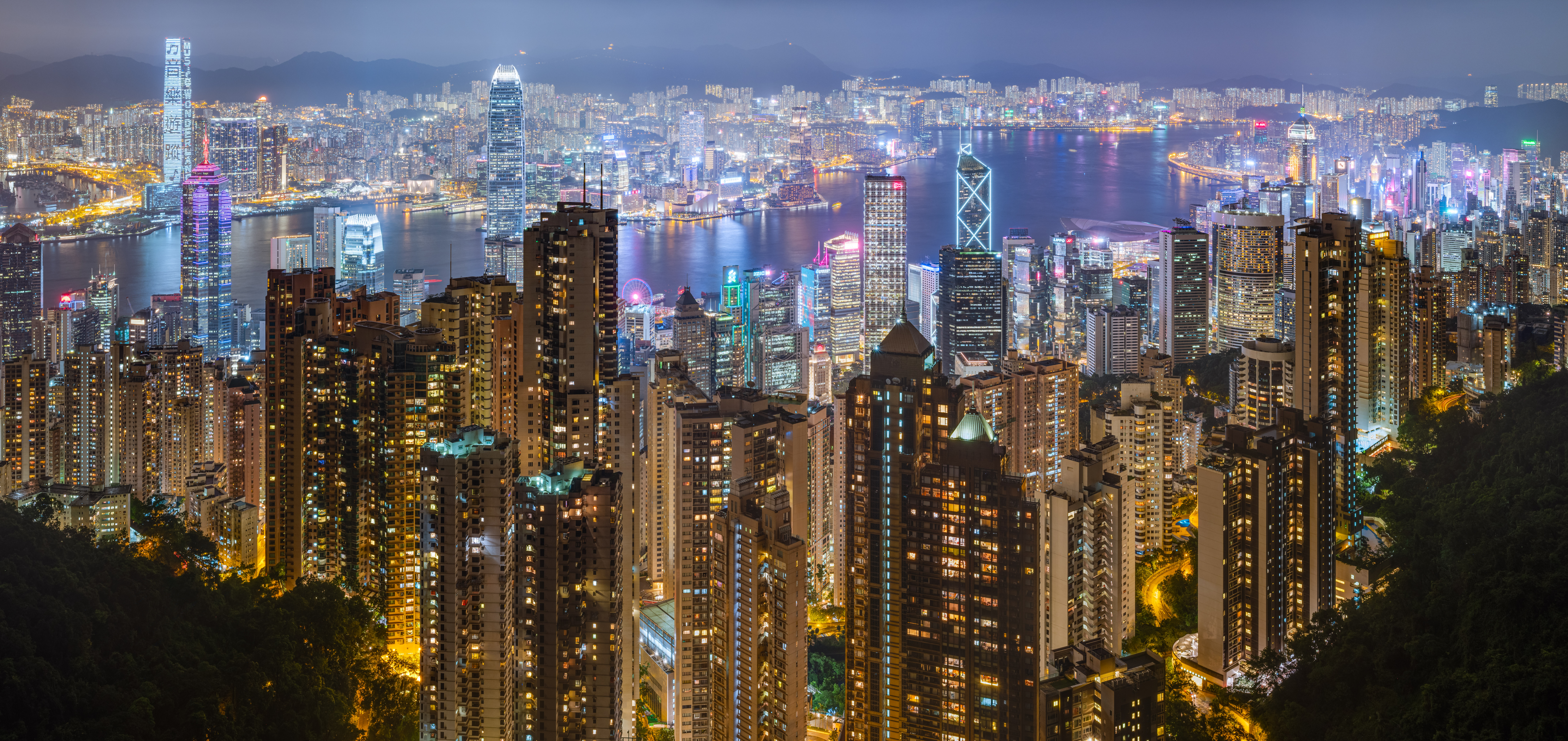
Hong Kong is one of the global financial centres and is known as a cosmopolitan metropolis.

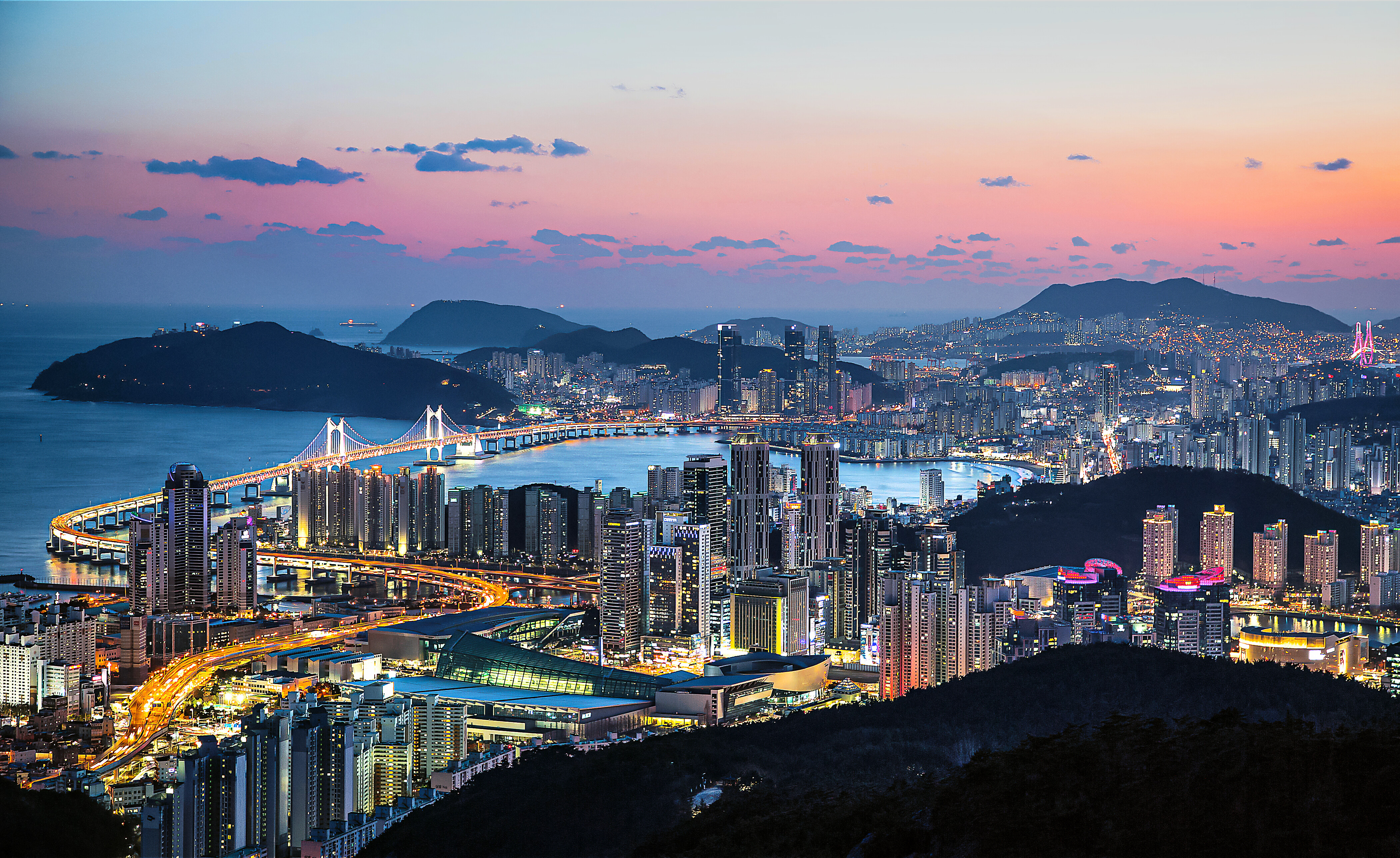
Busan is the second largest city in South Korea and a financial centre along with Seoul.

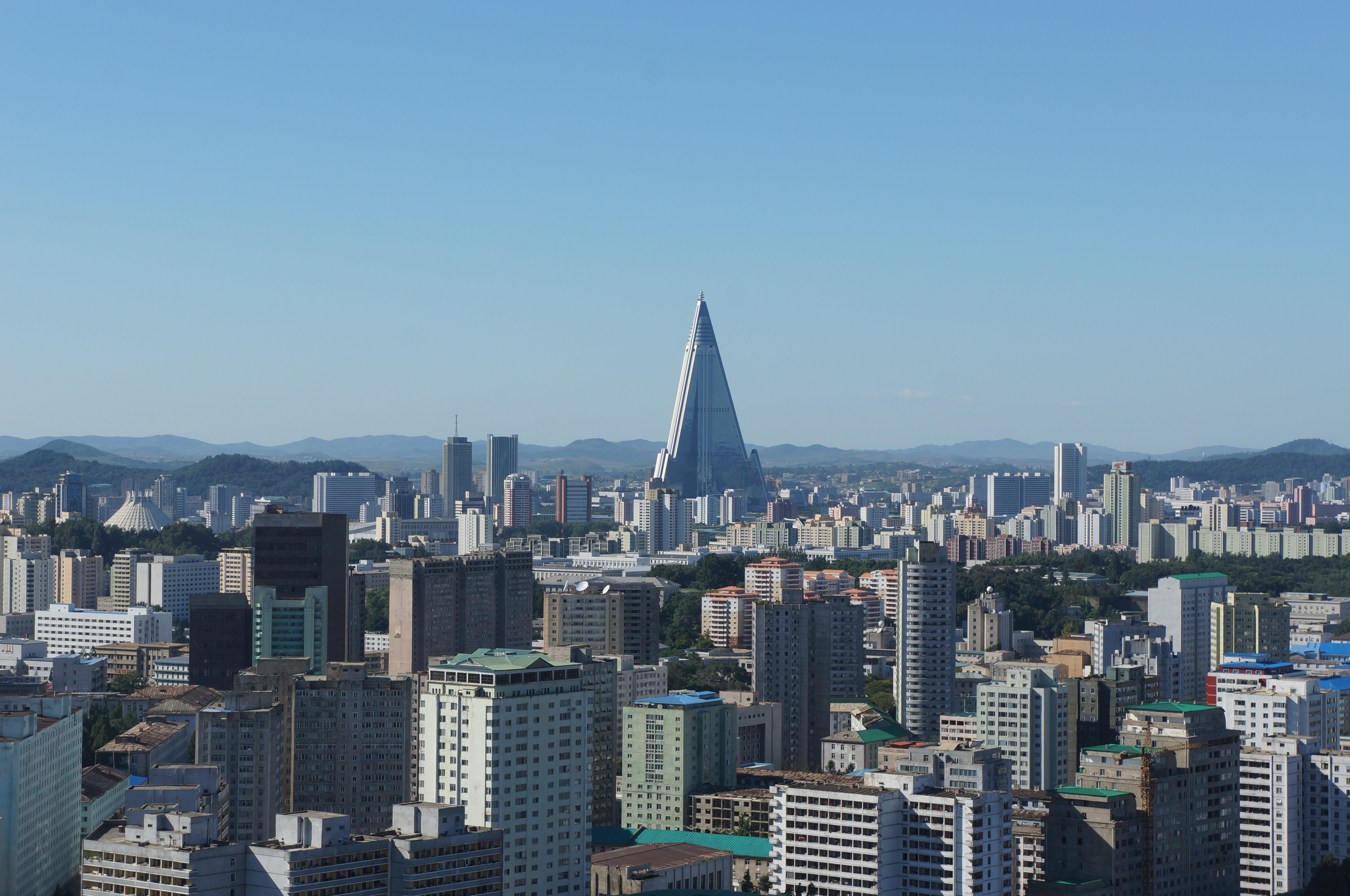
Pyongyang is the capital of North Korea, and a major city on the Korean Peninsula.

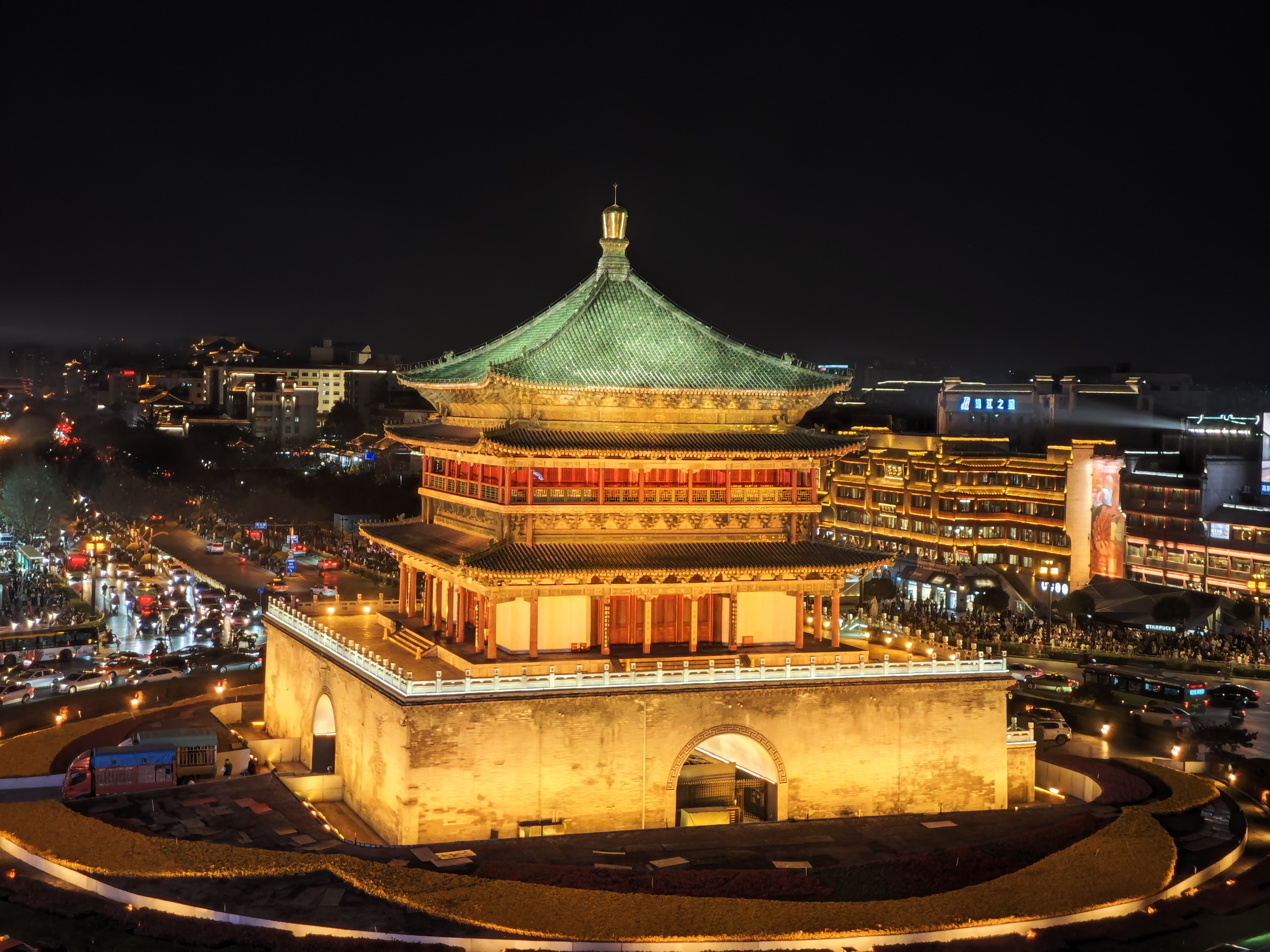
Xi'an or Chang'an is the oldest of the Four Great Ancient Capitals of China.

Pass of the ISS over Mongolia, looking out west towards the Pacific Ocean, China, and Japan. As the video progresses, major cities along the Chinese coast and the Japanese islands on the Philippine Sea are visible. The island of Guam can be seen further down the pass into the Philippine Sea, and the pass ends just to the east of New Zealand.

== See also ==
- East Asia–United States relations
- East Asian Community
- China–Japan–South Korea trilateral summit
- East Asia Summit
- East Asian studies
