= Mongolia women's national under-18 basketball team =

Youth national basketball team of Mongolia

Mongolia
- FIBA zone: FIBA Asia
- National federation: Mongolian Basketball Association
- Coach: G. Undrakh

U19 World Cup
- Appearances: None

U18 Asia Cup
- Appearances: 1
- Medals: None

U18 Asia Cup Division B
- Appearances: 1
- Medals: (silver) Silver: 1 (2022)
Home	Away
Medal record
Women's basketball
Representing Mongolia
U18 Asia Cup Division B
Silver medal – second place	2022 Bangalore	Team

The Mongolia women's national under-18 basketball team is a national basketball team of Mongolia, administered by the Mongolian Basketball Association. It represents the country in international under-18 women's basketball competitions.

== Tournament record ==
=== FIBA Under-18 Women's Asia Cup participations ===
Year	Division A	Division B
2002	10th	
2022		2nd place, silver medalist(s)

=== East Asian Youth Games ===
Year	Pos	Pld	W	L
(Mongolia) 2023	3rd	7	6	1
2027				
Total	1/1	7	6	1

=== FIBA 3x3 U18 World Cup ===
Year	Pos	Pld	W	L
(Hungary) 2022	13th	4	1	3
(Hungary) 2023	8th	5	3	2
(Hungary) 2024	Did not qualify			

== Head coaches ==
- (Mongolia) G. Undrakh
- (Mongolia) B. Altanzaya
- (Mongolia) B. Deleg

== Scores ==
=== 3x3 Basketball at the 2023 East Asian Youth Games ===
17 August 2023
15:00 UTC+8

Mongolia	15–18	Hong Kong

17 August 2023
16:00 UTC+8

Mongolia	15–19	Chinese Taipei

17 August 2023
17:20 UTC+8

China	21–16	Mongolia

==== Bronze medal match ====
18 August 2023
16:00 UTC+8

Hong Kong	10–12	Mongolia

=== 2022 FIBA Asia Under-18 Championship for Women ===
5 September 2022
13:30

Boxscore

Hong Kong	37–68	Mongolia
Scoring by quarter: 14-11, 22-9, 17-6, 15-11
Pts: W.Kong 9 Rebs: W.Kong 17; Asts: W.Cheung 3		Pts: B. Battsooj 21; Rebs: N.Nandinkhusel 18; Asts: N.Batjargal 9

Koramangala Indoor Stadium, Bengaluru

6 September 2022
15:45

Boxscore

Mongolia	72–57	Malaysia
Scoring by quarter: 14-15, 15-13, 12-14, 31-15
Pts: N.Nandinkhusel 29; Rebs: K.Altanzul 15; Asts: N.Nandinkhusel 3		Pts: H.Chong 15; Rebs: Z. Er 10; Asts: J.Yun 5

Koramangala Indoor Stadium, Bengaluru

7 September 2022
18:00

Boxscore

Jordan	36–48	Mongolia
Scoring by quarter: 4-9, 12-15, 9-9, 11-15
Pts: P.Dadson 10; Rebs: P.Dadson 10; Asts: N.Khoury 2		Pts: N.NamkhaiNyambuu 12; Rebs: K.Altanzul 14; Asts: N.NandinKhusel 6

Koramangala Indoor Stadium, Bengaluru

==== Semifinals ====
10 September 2022
6:00pm

Boxscore

Mongolia	65–64	Samoa
Scoring by quarter: 19-14, 11-19, 18-21, 17-10
Pts: B.Battsooj 19; Rebs: N.Nandinkhusel 12; Asts: N.Nandinkhusel 5		Pts: M.Ruud 18; Rebs: K.Filemu 12; Asts: Q.Finau-Stephano 6

Kanteerava Indoor Stadium, Bangalore

==== Final ====
11 September 2022
1:30pm

Boxscore

Malaysia	64–53	Mongolia
Scoring by quarter: 18-13, 14-14, 15-15, 17-11
Pts: H.Chong 16; Rebs: H.Chong 7 Asts: Q.Tan 5		Pts: N.Nandinkhusel 18; Rebs: K.Altanzul 19; Asts: N.Batjargal 4

Kanteerava Indoor Stadium, Bangalore

=== 2022 FIBA 3x3 Under-18 Women's World Cup ===
24 August 2022

Mongolia	21–8	Kyrgyzstan

24 August 2022

Mongolia	10–21	United States

25 August 2022

Mongolia	17–18	Ukraine

25 August 2022

Mongolia	17–21	Egypt

=== 2023 FIBA 3x3 Under-18 Women's World Cup ===
30 August 2023

Mongolia	14–11	Malaysia

30 August 2023

Chinese Taipei	14–16	Mongolia

1 September 2023

Mongolia	21–15	Thailand

1 September 2023

Poland	12–11	Mongolia

3 September 2023

United States	21–16	Mongolia

== See also ==
- Mongolia women's national basketball team
- Mongolia men's national under-18 basketball team
