= 2022 FIBA U18 Women's Asian Championship =

25th FIBA Under-18 Women's Asian Basketball Championship

Tournament details
- Host country: India
- City: Bangalore
- Dates: 5−11 September
- Teams: 16 (from 1 confederation)
- Venue: 2 (in 1 host city)

Final positions
- Champions: Australia (1st title)
- Runners-up: China
- Third place: Japan

Tournament statistics
- Top scorer: (Chinese Taipei) Hsiao Y.W. (19.2)
- Top rebounds: (Hong Kong) Kong W.Y. (14.3)
- Top assists: (Japan) Chinami Yokoyama (5.4)
- PPG (Team): Australia (94.8)
- RPG (Team): Thailand (56.6)
- APG (Team): Samoa (18.3)

Official website
- 2022 FIBA U18 Women's Asian Championship Division A 2022 FIBA U18 Women's Asian Championship Division B

The 2022 FIBA U18 Women's Asian Championship was an international under-18 basketball competition that was held in Bangalore, India, from 5 to 11 September 2022. The tournament was the 25th edition of the biennial FIBA U18 Women's Asian Championship. The top four teams qualified for the 2023 FIBA Under-19 Women's Basketball World Cup in Spain.

Australia defeated the defending champion China in the Final, with a score of 81-55, to annex their first championship overall. Meanwhile, Japan defeated Chinese Taipei, with a score of 77-45, in the Bronze Medal Match. South Korea defeated New Zealand with a score of 73-56 in a fifth-place match.

In Division B, Malaysia won the tournament beating Mongolia 64-53, and was promoted to Division A in the 2024 tournament. In the third-place game, the Philippines beat Samoa with a score of 84-68.

== Venues ==
Bangalore	Karnataka
Sree Kanteerava Indoor Stadium	2022 FIBA U18 Women's Asian Championship (Karnataka)
Capacity: 4,000	2022 FIBA U18 Women's Asian Championship (Karnataka)
Koramangala Indoor Stadium	2022 FIBA U18 Women's Asian Championship (Karnataka)
Capacity: 2,000	2022 FIBA U18 Women's Asian Championship (Karnataka)

== Qualified teams ==
For Division A:

- Top seven teams of the 2018 FIBA U18 Women's Asian Championship Division A:
  - China
  - Japan
  - Australia
  - South Korea
  - New Zealand
  - Chinese Taipei
  - Indonesia
- Winners of the 2018 FIBA U18 Women's Asian Championship Division B:
  - India

For Division B:

- Eighth team of the 2018 FIBA U18 Women's Asian Championship Division A:
  - Malaysia
- Two teams from the 2018 FIBA U18 Women's Asian Championship Division B:
  - Hong Kong
  - Samoa
- Other five teams from FIBA Asia:
  - Jordan
  - Maldives
  - Mongolia
  - Philippines
  - Thailand

== Competition format ==
The sixteen participating teams will be divided into two divisions, Division A and Division B of eight teams each.

In each division, the eight participating teams are divided into two groups (A and B) of four teams each.

Each team shall play all the other teams within its own group. The final stage standings will be established after the games for a total of twelve are all played.

Teams that will finish first in each group will advance to the semifinal round, awaiting the winners of the qualification to semifinals round.

Teams that will finish second and third in each group will face the third-placed and second-placed team, respectively, in the other group within its own division for the qualification to semifinals round.

Winners of the qualification to semifinals round will face the outright semifinalists in the semifinal round. Losers will face each other for the fifth-sixth place classification round.

For the seventh-eighth place classification round, teams that will finish fourth in each group will face the other fourth-placed team in the other group within its own division.

For Division A, all semifinalists will qualify to the 2023 FIBA U19 Women's Basketball World Cup.

The Champion team from Division B will be promoted to Division A for the next championship, replacing the eighth-placed team in Division A that will be relegated to Division B for the next championship.

== Divisions ==
Included were, the FIBA World Rankings prior to the games.

Division A	Division B
Australia (2); China (3); Japan (6); South Korea (18); New Zealand (20); Chinese Taipei (27); Indonesia (39); India (50)	Thailand (41); Hong Kong (42); Malaysia (46); Philippines (56); Mongolia (64); Samoa (84); Jordan (87); Maldives (100)

== Division A ==
=== Group Phase ===
The groups were announced on 4 September 2022.

==== Group A ====
Pos	Team	Pld	W	L	PF	PA	PD	Pts	Qualification
1	Australia	3	3	0	323	159	+164	6	Advance to semifinals
2	South Korea	3	2	1	216	207	+9	5	Qualification to qualifying round
3	New Zealand	3	1	2	174	255	−81	4	Qualification to qualifying round
4	India	3	0	3	159	251	−92	3	Qualification to seventh place game

Source: FIBA
Rules for classification: (1) Tournament points, (2) Head-to-head tournament points, (3) Head-to-head goal average, (4) Overall goal average, (5) Drawing of lots

6 September 2022
15:45

Boxscore

South Korea	81–64	New Zealand
Scoring by quarter: 28–14, 16–14, 23–19, 14–17
Pts: Park J. 18; Rebs: Park S. 13; Asts: Park J. 9		Pts: Leusogi-Ape 16; Rebs: Herman, Parke 5 Asts: Chatfield 7

Kanteerava Indoor Stadium, Bangalore
Referees: Wissam Zein (SYR), Taha Al-Hashedi (YEM), Joenard Garcia (PHI)

6 September 2022
18:00

Boxscore

Australia	116–49	India
Scoring by quarter: 32–8, 28–17, 31–10, 25–14
Pts: Borlase 20; Rebs: Heal, Petrie 8 Asts: Borlase, Puoch 6		Pts: Raja 14; Rebs: Krishnamurthi, Kaur Y. 5 Asts: Raja 4

Kanteerava Indoor Stadium, Bangalore
Referees: Elham Khazneh (IRI), Jin Leong Ong (SGP), Suk Yee Lau (HKG)

7 September 2022
13:30

Boxscore

New Zealand	44–111	Australia
Scoring by quarter: 13–31, 11–30, 10–28, 10–22
Pts: Dallow 10; Rebs: three players 6 Asts: Chatfield 3		Pts: Borlase 16; Rebs: Juffermans 10; Asts: Loughridge 5

Kanteerava Indoor Stadium, Bangalore
Referees: Mohammad Alamiri (KUW), Samaneh Dehghani (IRI), Jin Leong Ong (SGP)

7 September 2022
18:00

Boxscore

India	47–69	South Korea
Scoring by quarter: 8–20, 7–10, 13–21, 19–18
Pts: Kaur Y. 13; Rebs: Singh 10; Asts: Karu K. 4		Pts: Kim S. 15; Rebs: Park S. 15; Asts: Ko 6

Kanteerava Indoor Stadium, Bangalore
Referees: Yana Nikogossyan (KAZ), Bandar Jassim M J Al Suwaidi (QAT), Chitchanok Srisawat (THA)

8 September 2022
13:30

Boxscore

Australia	96–66	South Korea
Scoring by quarter: 22–17, 23–16, 26–14, 25–19
Pts: Puoch 23; Rebs: Puoch, Petrie 8 Asts: Loughridge 6		Pts: Baek 13; Rebs: Ko, Seo 4 Asts: Baek 6

Kanteerava Indoor Stadium, Bangalore
Referees: Wissam Zein (SYR), Taha Al-Hashedi (YEM), Elham Khazneh (JOR)

8 September 2022
18:00

Boxscore

New Zealand	66–63	India
Scoring by quarter: 17–9, 19–14, 15–24, 15–16
Pts: Cowley 16; Rebs: Chatfield 10; Asts: Chatfield 6		Pts: Kaur M. 21; Rebs: Kaur M. 12; Asts: Raja 7

Kanteerava Indoor Stadium, Bangalore
Referees: Bandar Jassim M J Al Suwaidi (QAT), Jin Leong Ong (SGP), Suk Yee Lau (HKG)

==== Group B ====
Pos	Team	Pld	W	L	PF	PA	PD	Pts	Qualification
1	Japan	3	3	0	273	171	+102	6	Advance to semifinals
2	Chinese Taipei	3	2	1	232	167	+65	5	Qualification to qualifying round
3	China	3	1	2	211	180	+31	4	Qualification to qualifying round
4	Indonesia	3	0	3	81	279	−198	3	Qualification to seventh place game

Source: FIBA
Rules for classification: (1) Tournament points, (2) Head-to-head tournament points, (3) Head-to-head goal average, (4) Overall goal average, (5) Drawing of lots

6 September 2022
11:15

Boxscore

Japan	90–77	Chinese Taipei
Scoring by quarter: 30–19, 32–19, 13–22, 25–17
Pts: Yasogawa 23; Rebs: Tsuno 10; Asts: Yokoyama 7		Pts: Hsiao 39; Rebs: Hsiao 15; Asts: Sung, Han 3

Kanteerava Indoor Stadium, Bangalore
Referees: Mohammad Alamiri (KUW), Bandar Jassim M J Al Suwaidi(QAT), Pisey Khourn (CAM)

6 September 2022
13:30

Boxscore

China	91–30	Indonesia
Scoring by quarter: 22–8, 29–15, 25–7, 15–1
Pts: Hu 19; Rebs: Lu 7 Asts: Chu 8		Pts: Madafa 5 Rebs: Madafa, Candra 4 Asts: Candra 2

Kanteerava Indoor Stadium, Bangalore
Referees: Yana Nikogossyan (KAZ), Samaneh Dehghani (IRI), Hwa Loong Ng (MAS)

7 September 2022
11:15

Boxscore

Indonesia	35–107	Japan
Scoring by quarter: 2–32, 6–26, 19–21, 8–28
Pts: Siregar 9 Rebs: Candra 6 Asts: Candra, Mahanani 2		Pts: Sasaka 17; Rebs: Morioka 8 Asts: Furuya 6

Kanteerava Indoor Stadium, Bangalore
Referees: Taha Al-Hashedi (YEM), Suk Yee Lau (HKG), Joenard Garcia (PHI)

7 September 2022
15:45

Boxscore

Chinese Taipei	74–61	China
Scoring by quarter: 10–25, 21–11, 25–8, 18–17
Pts: Chang 18; Rebs: Hsiao 14; Asts: Chang 5		Pts: Li W. 21; Rebs: Li W. 10; Asts: Chu 5

Kanteerava Indoor Stadium, Bangalore
Referees: Wissam Zein (SYR), Elham Khazneh (JOR), Hwa Loong Ng (MAS)

8 September 2022
11:15

Boxscore

Chinese Taipei	81–16	Indonesia
Scoring by quarter: 28–4, 20–4, 18–2, 15–6
Pts: Hsiao 18; Rebs: Chang 9 Asts: Chang, Yu 4		Pts: three players 4 Rebs: Candra 9 Asts: four players 1

Kanteerava Indoor Stadium, Bangalore
Referees: Samaneh Dehghani (IRI), Jeonard Garcia (PHI), Pisey Khourn (CAM)

8 September 2022
15:45

Boxscore

China	59–76	Japan
Scoring by quarter: 14–18, 11–24, 24–12, 10–22
Pts: Li W. 18; Rebs: Li W., Li Q. 8 Asts: Chu 4		Pts: Yokoyama 19; Rebs: Yamamoto, Tsuno 8 Asts: Yokoyama, Tsuno 5

Kanteerava Indoor Stadium, Bangalore
Referees: Mohammad Alamiri (KUW), Yana Nikogossyan (KAZ), Hwa Loong Ng (MAS)

=== Knockout round ===
==== Bracket ====
Qualification to Semifinals
9 September
Chinese Taipei	77
New Zealand	67
9 September
South Korea	53
China	70

Semifinals
10 September
Australia	70
Chinese Taipei	61
10 September
China	54
Japan	51

Finals
11 September
Australia	81
China	55
Third Place
11 September
Chinese Taipei	45
Japan	77

==== Seventh place game ====
9 September 2022
13:30

Boxscore

India	45–49	Indonesia
Scoring by quarter: 5–17, 17–10, 19–11, 4–10
Pts: Kaur 15; Rebs: Singh 10; Asts: Krishnamurthi 5		Pts: Siregar 14; Rebs: Candra 13; Asts: Candra, Ardelia 3

Kanteerava Indoor Stadium, Bangalore
Referees: Mohammad Al-Amiri (KUW), Taha Al-Hashedi (YEM), Elham Khazneh (JOR)

==== Qualification to Semifinals ====
9 September 2022
15:45

Boxscore

Chinese Taipei	77–67	New Zealand
Scoring by quarter: 27–9, 15–25, 14–20, 21–13
Pts: Hsiao 20; Rebs: Hsiao 23; Asts: Sung 6		Pts: Cowley 16; Rebs: Chatfield, Dallow 7 Asts: Dallow 3

Kanteerava Indoor Stadium, Bangalore
Referees: Yana Nikogossyan (KAZ), Samaneh Dehghani (IRI), Ong Jin Leong (SGP)

9 September 2022
18:00

Boxscore

South Korea	53–70	China
Scoring by quarter: 13–21, 15–14, 14–18, 11–17
Pts: Lee 14; Rebs: Park 6 Asts: Park 3		Pts: Li 26; Rebs: Chu 9 Asts: Chu 9

Kanteerava Indoor Stadium, Bangalore
Referees: Wissam Zein (SYR), Chitchanok Srisawat (THA), Bandar Jassim M J Al-Suwaidi (QAT)

==== Fifth place game ====
10 September 2022
13:30

Boxscore

South Korea	73–56	New Zealand
Scoring by quarter: 20–16, 13–15, 14–16, 26–9
Pts: Kim 15; Rebs: Seo 10; Asts: Kim 9		Pts: Morrow 11; Rebs: Cowley 6 Asts: Chatfield 5

Kanteerava Indoor Stadium, Bangalore
Referees: Imran Ali Baig (IND), Elham Khazneh (JOR), Ong Jin Leong (SGP)

==== Semifinals ====
10 September 2022
15:45

Boxscore

Australia	70–61	Chinese Taipei
Scoring by quarter: 22–16, 17–17, 16–13, 15–15
Pts: Borlase 19; Rebs: Juffermans 16; Asts: Borlase 6		Pts: Sung 25; Rebs: Hsiao 9 Asts: Sung 6

Kanteerava Indoor Stadium, Bangalore
Referees: Wissam Zein (SYR), Samaneh Dehghani (IRI), Bandar Jassim M J Al-Suwaidi (QAT)

10 September 2022
18:00

Boxscore

Japan	51–54	China
Scoring by quarter: 12–13, 10–18, 17–18, 17–5
Pts: Yokoyama, Owaki 10; Rebs: Owaki 8 Asts: Yokoyama 7		Pts: Chu 18; Rebs: Jiang 8 Asts: Feng 4

Kanteerava Indoor Stadium, Bangalore
Referees: Mohammad Al-Amiri (KUW), Yana Nikogossyan (KAZ), Taha Al-Hashedi (YEM)

==== Third place game ====
11 September 2022
15:45

Boxscore

Chinese Taipei	45–77	Japan
Scoring by quarter: 21–20, 14–18, 5–19, 5–20
Pts: Hsiao 12; Rebs: Hsiao 12; Asts: Sung, Mi 3		Pts: Yokoyama 16; Rebs: Yokoyama 10; Asts: Yokoyama, Owaki 3

Kanteerava Indoor Stadium, Bangalore
Referees: Wissam Zein (SYR), Taha Al-Hashedi (YEM), Samaneh Dehghani (IRI)

==== Final ====
11 September 2022
18:00

Boxscore

Australia	81–55	China
Scoring by quarter: 22–14, 22–16, 16–13, 21–12
Pts: Juffermans 26; Rebs: Juffermans 15; Asts: Loughridge 8		Pts: Wang 16; Rebs: Wang 5 Asts: Chu 6

Kanteerava Indoor Stadium, Bangalore
Referees: Yana Nikogossyan (KAZ), Mohammad Al-Amiri (KUW), Rakesh Ramalingaiah (IND)

== Division B ==
=== Group Phase ===
The groups were announced on 4 September 2022.

==== Group A ====
Pos	Team	Pld	W	L	PF	PA	PD	Pts	Qualification
1	Philippines	3	3	0	241	137	+104	6	Advance to semifinals
2	Samoa	3	2	1	219	141	+78	5	Qualification to qualifying round
3	Thailand	3	1	2	213	148	+65	4	Qualification to qualifying round
4	Maldives	3	0	3	95	342	−247	3	Qualification to seventh place game

Source: FIBA
Rules for classification: (1) Tournament points, (2) Head-to-head tournament points, (3) Head-to-head goal average, (4) Overall goal average, (5) Drawing of lots

5 September 2022
16:30

Boxscore

Thailand	50–65	Philippines
Scoring by quarter: 12–16, 13–14, 13-13, 12–22
Pts: Hewchaiyaphum 10; Rebs: Aupatam 8 Asts: Patthanauckkaranon, Sinlapawisut 3		Pts: Bobadilla 22; Rebs: Ozar 11; Asts: Ozar 4

Koramangala Indoor Stadium, Bangalore
Referees: Tomohiro Hosoda (JPN), Madison Crowley-Long (AUS), Swara Yoga Sangara (INA)

5 September 2022
20:30

Boxscore

Samoa	108–36	Maldives
Scoring by quarter: 25–3, 22–3, 28–15, 33–15
Pts: Filemu 24; Rebs: Filemu, Joseph 15; Asts: Manumaleuga 5		Pts: Inasha, Ibrahim 7 Rebs: Inasha, Amir 8 Asts: Inasha, Ali 2

Koramangala Indoor Stadium, Bangalore
Referees: Imran Ali Baig (IND), Huang Yun Hsuan (TPE), Sabuj Md. Miha (BAN)

6 September 2022
11:15

Boxscore

Maldives	31–124	Thailand
Scoring by quarter: 3–25, 14–39, 8–26, 6–34
Pts: Simad 9 Rebs: Ibrahim 5 Asts: Amir, Shahid 2		Pts: Hewchaiyaphum 21; Rebs: Manyum 9 Asts: Patthanauckkaranon 11

Koramangala Indoor Stadium, Bangalore
Referees: Sasha Nicholson (NZL), KIM Cheong-Soo (KOR), Alan C Jose (IND)

6 September 2022
18:00

Boxscore

Philippines	66–59	Samoa
Scoring by quarter: 21–9, 12–11, 16–20, 17-19
Pts: Sugapong 28; Rebs: Bobadilla 9 Asts: Bobadilla 6		Pts: Filemu 19; Rebs: Filemu 13; Asts: Brown 5

Koramangala Indoor Stadium, Bangalore
Referees: Rakesh Ramalingaiah (IND), Hu Jing (CHN), Swara Yoga Sangara (INA)

7 September 2022
11:15

Boxscore

Thailand	39–52	Samoa
Scoring by quarter: 10-13, 8-15, 12-13, 9-11
Pts: Chipcharoenrat, Goldemann 9 Rebs: Hewchaiyaphum 15; Asts: Goldemann 3		Pts: Filemu 21; Rebs: Filemu 14; Asts: Rudd 5

Koramangala Indoor Stadium, Bangalore
Referees: Imran Ali Baig (IND), Huang Yun Hsuan (TPE), Swara Yoga Sangara (INA)

7 September 2022
13:30

Boxscore

Maldives	28–110	Philippines
Scoring by quarter: 6–21, 7–33, 9–33, 6–23
Pts: Simad 15; Rebs: Inasha 10; Asts: Ibrahim 4		Pts: Ozar 22; Rebs: Abraham 11; Asts: Loon 8

Koramangala Indoor Stadium, Bangalore
Referees: Madison Crowley-Long (AUS), Hu Jing (CHN), Gayan Buddhika Kahingala Waduge (SRI)

==== Group B ====
Pos	Team	Pld	W	L	PF	PA	PD	Pts	Qualification
1	Mongolia	3	3	0	188	130	+58	6	Advance to semifinals
2	Malaysia	3	1	2	158	163	−5	4	Qualification to qualifying round
3	Jordan	3	1	2	117	127	−10	4	Qualification to qualifying round
4	Hong Kong	3	1	2	131	174	−43	4	Qualification to seventh place game

Source: FIBA
Rules for classification: (1) Tournament points, (2) Head-to-head tournament points, (3) Head-to-head goal average, (4) Overall goal average, (5) Drawing of lots

5 September 2022
13:30

Boxscore

Hong Kong	37–68	Mongolia
Scoring by quarter: 11–14, 9–22, 6-17, 11–15
Pts: Kong 9 Rebs: Kong 17; Asts: Cheung 3		Pts: Battsooj 21; Rebs: Nandinkhusel 18; Asts: Batjarsal 9

Koramangala Indoor Stadium, Bangalore
Referees: Kim Cheong-Soo (KOR), Sasha Nicholson (NZL), Alan C Jose (IND)

5 September 2022
18:30

Boxscore

Malaysia	36–40	Jordan
Scoring by quarter: 12–14, 14–5, 7–13, 3-8
Pts: Chong 12; Rebs: Ng 9 Asts: Chong 4		Pts: Dadson 12; Rebs: Jumah 13; Asts: Jumah 3

Koramangala Indoor Stadium, Bangalore
Referees: Rakesh Ramalingaiah (IND), Hu Jing (CHN), Gayan Buddhika Kahingala Waduge (SRI)

6 September 2022
13:30

Boxscore

Jordan	41–43	Hong Kong
Scoring by quarter: 5–5, 9–11, 9–18, 18–9
Pts: Dadson 9 Rebs: Jumah 14; Asts: Halaseh 3		Pts: Lam 16; Rebs: Cheuk, Kong 15; Asts: Cheuk, Cheung 3

Koramangala Indoor Stadium, Bangalore
Referees: Imran Ali Baig (IND), Madison Crowley-Long (AUS), Tomohiro Hosoda (JPN)

6 September 2022
15:45

Boxscore

Mongolia	72–57	Malaysia
Scoring by quarter: 14–15, 15–13, 12–14, 31–15
Pts: Nandinkhusel 29; Rebs: Altanzul 15; Asts: Batjarsal, Namkhainyambuu, Battsooj, Nandinkhusel 3		Pts: Jia, Chong 15; Rebs: Zi 10; Asts: Jia 5

Koramangala Indoor Stadium, Bangalore
Referees: Huang Yun Hsuan (TPE), Sabuj Md. Miha (BAN), Gayan Buddhika Kahingala Waduge (SRI)

7 September 2022
15:45

Boxscore

Hong Kong	51–65	Malaysia
Scoring by quarter: 19–11, 10–15, 9–18, 13–21
Pts: Kong 13; Rebs: Lam, Kong 11; Asts: Li, Cheung 3		Pts: Chong 15; Rebs: Tan 8 Asts: Chong 7

Koramangala Indoor Stadium, Bangalore
Referees: Tomohiro Hosoda (JPN), Alac C Jose (IND), Sabuj Md. Miha (BAN)

7 September 2022
18:00

Boxscore

Jordan	36–48	Mongolia
Scoring by quarter: 4-9, 12–15, 9–9, 11–15
Pts: Dadson 10; Rebs: Dadson 10; Asts: Khoury 2		Pts: Namkhainyambuu 12; Rebs: Altanzul 14; Asts: Nandinkhusel 6

Koramangala Indoor Stadium, Bangalore
Referees: Rakesh Ramalingaiah (IND), Sasha Nicholson (NZL), KIM Cheong-Soo (KOR)

=== Knockout round ===
==== Bracket ====
Qualification to Semifinals
9 September
Malaysia	57
Thailand	54
9 September
Samoa	61
Jordan	55

Semifinals
10 September
Philippines	65
Malaysia	66
10 September
Mongolia	65
Samoa	64

Finals
11 September
Malaysia	64
Mongolia	53
Third Place
11 September
Philippines	84
Samoa	68

==== Seventh place game ====
9 September 2022
13:30

Boxscore

Maldives	25–88	Hong Kong
Scoring by quarter: 6–26, 8–23, 0–17, 11–22
Pts: Inasha 10; Rebs: Inasha 19; Asts: Iuthimadh 2		Pts: Kong 22; Rebs: Kong 14; Asts: Lam 8

Koramangala Indoor Stadium, Bangalore
Referees: Sasha Nicholson (NZL), Sabuj Md. Miha (BAN), Madison Crowley-Long (AUS)

==== Qualification to Semifinals ====
9 September 2022
15:45

Boxscore

Samoa	61–55	Jordan
Scoring by quarter: 13-13, 11–13, 22–13, 15-16
Pts: Ruud 18; Rebs: Ruud 15; Asts: Manumaleuga 7		Pts: Dadson 20; Rebs: Sahlieh 10; Asts: Halaseh 5

Koramangala Indoor Stadium, Bangalore
Referees: Imran Ali Baig (IND), Hu Jing (CHN), Tomihiro Hosoda (JPN)

9 September 2022
18:00

Boxscore

Malaysia	57–54	Thailand
Scoring by quarter: 9–15, 9-11, 16-17, 23-11
Pts: Tan 16; Rebs: Chong 9 Asts: Jia, Chong 6		Pts: Sakaret 22; Rebs: Hewchaiyaphum 14; Asts: Aupatam 4

Koramangala Indoor Stadium, Bangalore
Referees: Rakesh Ramalingaiah (IND), Kim Cheong-Soo (KOR), HUANG Yun Hsuan (TPE)

==== Fifth place game ====
10 September 2022
13:30

Boxscore

Jordan	41–63	Thailand
Scoring by quarter: 4–15, 8–12, 15–17, 14-19
Pts: Jumah 12; Rebs: Dadson 9 Asts: Al-Majali, Abu-eid 2		Pts: Hewchaiyaphum 15; Rebs: Manyum 10; Asts: Aupatam 7

Koramangala Indoor Stadium, Bangalore
Referees: Madison Crowley-Long (AUS), Gayan Buddhika Kahingala Waduge (SRI), Lau Suk Yee (HKG)

==== Semifinals ====
10 September 2022
15:45

Boxscore

Philippines	65–66 (OT)	Malaysia
Scoring by quarter: 16–13, 14–23, 19–15, 13-11, Overtime: 3-4
Pts: Bobadilla 19; Rebs: Loon 10; Asts: Nolasco 7		Pts: Jia 14; Rebs: Ng 12; Asts: Er, Ng 4

Koramangala Indoor Stadium, Bangalore
Referees: Kim Cheong-Soo (KOR), Tomihiro Hosoda (JPN), Sasha Nicholson (NZL)

10 September 2022
18:00

Boxscore

Mongolia	65–64	Samoa
Scoring by quarter: 19–14, 11-19, 18-21, 17-10
Pts: Battsooj 19; Rebs: Nandinkhusel 12; Asts: Nandinkhusel 5		Pts: Rudd 18; Rebs: Filemu 12; Asts: Finau-Stephano 6

Koramangala Indoor Stadium, Bangalore
Referees: Rakesh Ramalingaiah (IND), Hu Jing (CHN), Huang Yun Hsuan (TPE)

==== Third place game ====
11 September 2022
11:15

Boxscore

Philippines	84–68	Samoa
Scoring by quarter: 13–17, 18–24, 28-8, 25-19
Pts: Sugapong 27; Rebs: three players 6 Asts: Nolasco 5		Pts: Ruud 30; Rebs: Filemu, Ruud 13; Asts: Filemu 5

Kanteerava Indoor Stadium, Bangalore
Referees: Elham Khazneh (JOR), Kim Cheong-Soo (KOR), Hu Jing (CHN)

==== Final ====
11 September 2022
13:30

Boxscore

Malaysia	64–53	Mongolia
Scoring by quarter: 18–13, 14–14, 15-15, 17–11
Pts: Chong 16; Rebs: Tan, Chong 7 Asts: Tan 5		Pts: Nandinkhuse 18; Rebs: Altanzul 19; Asts: Batjargal 4

Kanteerava Indoor Stadium, Bangalore
Referees: Imran Ali Baig (IND), Sasha Nicholson (NZL), Bandar Jassim M J Al Suwaidi (QAT)

== Final standings ==
Qualified for the 2023 FIBA U19 Women's Basketball World Cup
Relegated to Division B of the 2024 FIBA U18 Women's Asia Cup

Rank	Team	Record
1st place, gold medalist(s)	Australia	5–0
2nd place, silver medalist(s)	China	3–3
3rd place, bronze medalist(s)	Japan	4–2
4	Chinese Taipei	3–3
5	South Korea	3–2
6	New Zealand	1–4
7	Indonesia	1–3
8	India	0–4

Promoted to Division A of the 2024 FIBA U18 Women's Asia Cup

Rank	Team	Record
1	Malaysia	4–2
2	Mongolia	4–1
3	Philippines	4–1
4	Samoa	3–3
5	Thailand	2–3
6	Jordan	1–4
7	Hong Kong	2–2
8	Maldives	0–4
