= Basketball at the 2023 East Asian Youth Games =

International basketball competition in Ulaanbaatar, Mongolia

Tournament details
- Host country: Mongolia
- City: Ulaanbaatar
- Dates: 19–23 August
- Teams: 5(men); 3(women)
- Venue(s): UG Arena

Basketball was held at the 2023 East Asian Youth Games during August 19 to 23, 2023, at the UG Arena in Ulaanbaatar, Mongolia. Only athletes born on 2005.01.01 – 2007.12.31 were allowed to participate.

== Medal table ==
* Host nation (Mongolia)

Rank	Nation	Gold	Silver	Bronze	Total
1	China (CHN)	2	0	0	2
2	Chinese Taipei (TPE)	0	1	0	1
2	Hong Kong (HKG)	0	1	0	1
4	Mongolia (MGL)	0	0	2	2
Totals (4 entries)		2	2	2	6

== Medal summary ==
Event	Gold	Silver	Bronze
Men	China	Chinese Taipei	Mongolia
Women	China	Hong Kong	Mongolia

== Men`s event ==
Team	Pld	W	L	PF	PA	PD	Pts
China	4	4	0	410	277	+133	8
Chinese Taipei	4	3	1	370	331	+39	7
Mongolia	4	2	2	313	318	−5	6
Hong Kong	4	1	3	336	338	−2	5
Macau	4	0	4	224	369	−145	4

19 August 2023
15:00 UTC+8

Mongolia	94–97	Chinese Taipei

19 August 2023
19:00 UTC+8

Hong Kong	77–65	Macau

20 August 2023
17:00 UTC+8

China	92–61	Mongolia

20 August 2023
19:00 UTC+8

Chinese Taipei	97–74	Hong Kong

21 August 2023
15:00 UTC+8

Hong Kong	74–76	Mongolia

21 August 2023
19:00 UTC+8

China	115–44	Macau

22 August 2023
17:00 UTC+8

China	110–51	Hong Kong

22 August 2023
19:00 UTC+8

Macau	70–95	Chinese Taipei

23 August 2023
15:00 UTC+8

Chinese Taipei	81–93	China

23 August 2023
19:00 UTC+8

Mongolia	82–55	Macau

== Women`s event ==
Team	Pld	W	L	PF	PA	PD	Pts
China	2	2	0	174	77	+97	4
Hong Kong	2	1	1	124	113	+11	3
Mongolia	2	0	2	75	183	−108	2

19 August 2023
17:00 UTC+8

Mongolia	44–78	Hong Kong

21 August 2023
17:00 UTC+8

Hong Kong	46–69	China

23 August 2023
17:00 UTC+8

China	105–31	Mongolia
