= Mongolia men's national under-18 basketball team =

Mongolia
- FIBA zone: FIBA Asia
- National federation: Mongolian Basketball Association

U19 World Cup
- Appearances: None

U18 Asia Cup
- Appearances: 2 (2012, 2024)
- Medals: None
Medal record
2023 East Asian Youth Games
Representing Mongolia
East Asian Youth Games
Gold medal – first place	2023 Ulaanbaatar

The Mongolia men's national under-18 basketball team is a national basketball team of Mongolia, administered by the Mongolian Basketball Association. It represents the country in international under-18 men's basketball competitions.

== Tournament record ==
=== FIBA Under-18 Asia Cup participations ===
Year	Result
2012	14th
2024	16th

=== East Asian Youth Games ===
Year	Pos	Pld	W	L
(Mongolia) 2023	1st	7	7	0
2027				
Total	1/1	7	6	1

=== FIBA 3x3 U18 World Cup ===
Year	Pos	Pld	W	L
(Hungary) 2022	9th	4	2	2
(Hungary) 2023	14th	3	1	2
(Hungary) 2024	Did not qualify			

== Scores ==
=== 3x3 basketball at the 2023 East Asian Youth Games ===
17 August 2023
16:40 UTC+8

Hong Kong	9–21	Mongolia

17 August 2023
17:40 UTC+8

Mongolia	21–17	China

=== Gold medal match ===
18 August 2023
17:00 UTC+8

Mongolia	18–15	China

=== FIBA 3x3 U18 World Cup ===
23 August 2022

Mongolia	22–18	Latvia

23 August 2022

Mongolia	20–21	Kyrgyzstan

25 August 2022

Mongolia	16–17	Portugal

25 August 2022

Mongolia	20–15	Chile

=== FIBA 3x3 U18 World Cup ===
31 August 2023

Mongolia	12–21	Qatar

31 August 2023

Mongolia	21–0	DR Congo

2 September 2023

Mongolia	22–10	Tunisia

2 September 2023

Mongolia	7–21	Germany

=== 2024 FIBA U18 Asia Cup ===
2 September 2024
10:30

Boxscore

Australia	93–32	Mongolia
Scoring by quarter: 24-10, 22-8, 25-6, 22-8
Pts: Jack Whitbourn; Rebs: Jack Whitbourn; Asts: Mason John Honeyman		Pts: Baljinnyam Ganzorig; Rebs: Baljinnyam Ganzorig; Asts: Ochir Sainbileg

As Salt, Arena Complex Amman
Referees: Daraghma, Anan (PLE) Yaroshenko, Vladislav (KAZ) Lesmana, Rendra (INA)

3 September 2024
13:00

Boxscore

Mongolia	46–92	Chinese Taipei
Scoring by quarter: 6-22, 13-13, 13-32, 14-25
Pts: Tuvshinjargal Gantulga; Rebs: Ochir Sainbileg; Asts: Enkhjavkhlan Enkhbayar		Pts: Jayden Jonathan Jones; Rebs: Yu-Chun Shen; Asts: Cheng-Lung Chuang

As Salt, Arena Complex Amman
Referees: TAHA, Mohammad (JOR) RAHJI, Elie (SYR) CAÑETE, Aaron Rey (PHI)

4 September 2024
13:00

Boxscore

Lebanon	66–45	Mongolia
Scoring by quarter: 26-8, 20-9, 7-14, 13-14
Pts: nikolai choueiri Rebs: nikolai choueiri Asts: Karim Oueidat		Pts: Tuvshinjargal Gantulga; Rebs: Baljinnyam Ganzorig; Asts: Temuujin Enkhbat

As Salt, Arena Complex Amman
Referees: ALTARAWNEH, Mohammed Ismail (JOR) LESMANA, Rendra (INA) CAÑETE, Aaron Rey (PHI)

== See also ==
- Mongolia men's national basketball team
- Mongolia women's national under-18 basketball team
