= 2006 East Asian Judo Championships =

Judo competition in Ulaanbaatar, Mongolia

Judo Judo
- Venue: Bökhiin Örgöö
- Location: Ulaanbaatar, Mongolia
- Dates: 2-3 September 2006

Competition at external databases
- Links: JudoInside

The 2006 East Asian Judo Championships was contested in seven weight classes, seven each for men and women.

This competition was held at Bökhiin Örgöö in Ulaanbaatar, Mongolia, 2 and 3 September.

== Medal overview ==
=== Men's events ===
| Event | Gold | Silver | Bronze |
|---|---|---|---|
| Extra-lightweight (60 kg) | Hiroaki Hiraoka (JPN) | Tengis Tsagaanbaatar (MGL) | Ganbat Boldbaatar (MGL) |
| Extra-lightweight (60 kg) | Hiroaki Hiraoka (JPN) | Tengis Tsagaanbaatar (MGL) | Ri Chol-Ryong (PRK) |
| Half-lightweight (66 kg) | K.Tsagaanbaatar (MGL) | Bang Gui-Man (KOR) | Toshiaki Umetsu (JPN) |
| Half-lightweight (66 kg) | K.Tsagaanbaatar (MGL) | Bang Gui-Man (KOR) | Yang Xiaoming (CHN) |
| Lightweight (73 kg) | Masato Inazawa (JPN) | O. Bold-Erdene (MGL) | Zeng Qindong (CHN) |
| Lightweight (73 kg) | Masato Inazawa (JPN) | O. Bold-Erdene (MGL) | N. Sainjargal (MGL) |
| Half-middleweight (81 kg) | Kim Min-Kyu (KOR) | Bunddorj Janchivdorj (MGL) | N. Damdinsuren (MGL) |
| Half-middleweight (81 kg) | Kim Min-Kyu (KOR) | Bunddorj Janchivdorj (MGL) | Jia Jingyang (CHN) |
| Middleweight (90 kg) | Choi Sun-Ho (KOR) | A. Batbayar (MGL) | Tatsuki Masubuchi (JPN) |
| Middleweight (90 kg) | Choi Sun-Ho (KOR) | A. Batbayar (MGL) | B. Batmunh (MGL) |
| Half-heavyweight (100 kg) | Hidekazu Inomata (JPN) | Yoo Kwang-sun (KOR) | Tsend-Ayush Ochirbat (MGL) |
| Half-heavyweight (100 kg) | Hidekazu Inomata (JPN) | Yoo Kwang-sun (KOR) | D.Davaanyam (MGL) |
| Heavyweight (+100 kg) | Hong Sung-Hyun (KOR) | Wei Xiangjun (CHN) | Hidekazu Shoda (JPN) |
| Heavyweight (+100 kg) | Hong Sung-Hyun (KOR) | Wei Xiangjun (CHN) | N. Tüvshinbayar (MGL) |

=== Women's events ===
| Event | Gold | Silver | Bronze |
|---|---|---|---|
| Extra-lightweight (48 kg) | Tomoko Fukumi (JPN) | Xiao Jun (CHN) | Jung Ji-Sun (KOR) |
| Extra-lightweight (48 kg) | Tomoko Fukumi (JPN) | Xiao Jun (CHN) | Pak Ok-Song (PRK) |
| Half-lightweight (52 kg) | Pak Myong-Hui (PRK) | Shi Junjie (CHN) | Hisae Takara (JPN) |
| Half-lightweight (52 kg) | Pak Myong-Hui (PRK) | Shi Junjie (CHN) | M. Bundmaa (MGL) |
| Lightweight (57 kg) | Yan Xuelan (CHN) | Hwang Chun-gum (PRK) | Rie Iwafuji (JPN) |
| Lightweight (57 kg) | Yan Xuelan (CHN) | Hwang Chun-gum (PRK) | K. Erdenet-Od (MGL) |
| Half-middleweight (63 kg) | Nozomi Hirai (JPN) | Dou Shumei (CHN) | Lee Bok-Hee (KOR) |
| Half-middleweight (63 kg) | Nozomi Hirai (JPN) | Dou Shumei (CHN) | Battugs Tumen-Od (MGL) |
| Middleweight (70 kg) | Wang Juan (CHN) | Mina Watanabe (JPN) | Liu Shu Yun (TPE) |
| Middleweight (70 kg) | Wang Juan (CHN) | Mina Watanabe (JPN) | M. Tsedevsuren (MGL) |
| Half-heavyweight (78 kg) | Hitomi Ikeda (JPN) | Jung Kyung-Mi (KOR) | P. Lkhamdegd (MGL) |
| Half-heavyweight (78 kg) | Hitomi Ikeda (JPN) | Jung Kyung-Mi (KOR) | I Yanxu (CHN) |
| Heavyweight (+78 kg) | Liu Huanyuan (CHN) | D.Tserenkhand (MGL) | Naomi Komaki (JPN) |
| Heavyweight (+78 kg) | Liu Huanyuan (CHN) | D.Tserenkhand (MGL) | Lee Hyun-Kyung (KOR) |

=== Medals table ===
| Rank | Nation | Gold | Silver | Bronze | Total |
|---|---|---|---|---|---|
| 1 | Japan | 6 | 1 | 6 | 13 |
| 2 | China | 3 | 4 | 4 | 11 |
| 3 | South Korea | 3 | 3 | 3 | 9 |
| 4 | Mongolia | 1 | 5 | 12 | 18 |
| 5 | North Korea | 1 | 1 | 2 | 4 |
| 6 | Chinese Taipei | 0 | 0 | 1 | 1 |
| Totals (6 entries) | | 14 | 14 | 28 | 56 |
