= Taekwondo at the 2023 East Asian Youth Games =

- Dates: 19–20 August 2023
- Host city: Ulaanbaatar, Mongolia
- Venue: Steppe Arena
- Level: Youth
- Events: 10
- Participation: 54 athletes from 6 nations

Taekwondo was held at the 2023 East Asian Youth Games from August 19 to 20, 2023, at the Steppe Arena in Ulaanbaatar, Mongolia. Only athletes born on 2006.01.01 – 2008.12.31 were allowed to participate.

== Medal table ==
* Host nation (Mongolia)

Rank	Nation	Gold	Silver	Bronze	Total
1	China (CHN)	5	3	2	10
2	Chinese Taipei (TPE)	4	1	2	7
3	South Korea (KOR)	1	4	3	8
4	Hong Kong (HKG)	0	1	6	7
5	Japan (JPN)	0	1	3	4
6	Mongolia (MGL)	0	0	4	4
Totals (6 entries)		10	10	20	40

== Medal summary ==
=== Boys' events ===
Event	Gold	Silver	Bronze
48 kg	Wang Shuohan; China	Riku Takamaru; Japan	Jang Seoyun; South Korea
48 kg	Wang Shuohan; China	Riku Takamaru; Japan	Tsz Hin Kam; Hong Kong
48-55 kg	Li Cien; Chinese Taipei	Kim Keonho; South Korea	Wang Nuoyan; China
48-55 kg	Li Cien; Chinese Taipei	Kim Keonho; South Korea	Cheuk Wang Neville Chan; Hong Kong
55-63 kg	Ke Siang-han; Chinese Taipei	Jiao Yiren; China	Takato Katoh; Japan
55-63 kg	Ke Siang-han; Chinese Taipei	Jiao Yiren; China	Chun Hei Tam; Hong Kong
63-73 kg	Chen Leide; China	Oscar Yu; Hong Kong	Inguun Shirmenbaatar; Mongolia
63-73 kg	Chen Leide; China	Oscar Yu; Hong Kong	Chin Mincheol; South Korea
+73 kg	Lee Hwan; South Korea	Cui Fuyuan; China	Tsogjavkhlant Enkhtur; Mongolia
+73 kg	Lee Hwan; South Korea	Cui Fuyuan; China	Chuang Po-wu; Chinese Taipei

=== Girls' events ===
Event	Gold	Silver	Bronze
44 kg	Huang Ching-yun; Chinese Taipei	Zheng Zhihan; China	Oh Taelin; South Korea
44 kg	Huang Ching-yun; Chinese Taipei	Zheng Zhihan; China	Sum Yi Ma; Hong Kong
44-49 kg	Fu Xiaolu; China	Kim Minseo; South Korea	Ruka Okamoto; Japan
44-49 kg	Fu Xiaolu; China	Kim Minseo; South Korea	Ka Yee Chow; Hong Kong
49-55 kg	Dai Zongyuan; China	Chou Mei-tsu; Chinese Taipei	Otoa Ishida; Japan
49-55 kg	Dai Zongyuan; China	Chou Mei-tsu; Chinese Taipei	Cheuk Tung Chan; Hong Kong
55-63 kg	Shen Zinuo; China	Kwon Hyeogji; South Korea	Hsieh Yi-ling; Chinese Taipei
55-63 kg	Shen Zinuo; China	Kwon Hyeogji; South Korea	Enkhchimeg Ganzorig; Mongolia
+63 kg	Wang Wei-chia; Chinese Taipei	Lim Yerim; South Korea	Udval Purevjal; Mongolia
+63 kg	Wang Wei-chia; Chinese Taipei	Lim Yerim; South Korea	Sun Jiahui; China

== Participating nations ==
54 Athletes from 6 NOCs participate in the event:

1. China (10)
2. Hong Kong (8)
3. Japan (6)
4. South Korea (10)
5. Chinese Taipei (10)
6. Mongolia (10)
