= 2019 East Asian Youth Games =

- Host city: Taichung, Taiwan
- Nations: 9
- Athletes: 1500
- Events: 12 sports
- Opening: cancelled

The 2019 East Asian Youth Games were to be the first international multi-sport event for countries in East Asia.

== Participating nations ==
All eight countries whose National Olympic Committee is recognized by the East Asian Games Association and one country whose National Olympic Committee is recognized by the Oceania National Olympic Committees, would have participated had the games not been cancelled.

- China
- North Korea
- Guam^{1}
- Hong Kong
- Japan
- South Korea
- Macau
- Mongolia
- Chinese Taipei

^{1} Associate member

== History ==
Taichung, Taiwan was selected to be the host city for the first East Asian Youth Games on October 24, 2014 during the 32nd East Asian Games Association Council Meeting in Beijing, China. The Taichung City Government originally planned to establish a committee for the Games in December 2014, but this was postponed until June 26, 2015, when the 2019 East Asian Youth Games Organization Committee (2019年東亞青年運動會籌備委員會) was set up. This was to be the first time Taichung City had organised an international multi-sport event, as well as being the first East Asian Youth Games. On July 31, 2018, Taichung was stripped of hosting rights after a vote by the East Asian Olympic Committee. The cancellation was due to Chinese anger over public calls in Taiwan for a referendum on whether Taiwan should be allowed to compete under the name "Taiwan" at the 2020 Summer Olympics and pro-independence campaign, or should continue to compete under the name "Chinese Taipei", as it has been forced to acquiesce to since the 1970s.

== Sports ==
There would have been be ten core sports events and two non-core sports events during the East Asian Youth Games. The core events were to be athletics, aquatics (swimming and diving), judo, taekwondo, three to three basketball, futsal, table tennis, badminton, tennis (tennis and soft tennis), and beach volleyball. Cycling and canoeing were to be non-core events.

== See also ==
- List of sporting events in Taiwan
