= Judo at the 2023 East Asian Youth Games =

- Dates: 17–18 August 2023
- Host city: Ulaanbaatar, Mongolia
- Venue: Steppe Arena
- Level: Youth
- Events: 12
- Participation: 50 athletes from 5 nations

Judo competitions were held at the 2023 East Asian Youth Games from 17 to 18 August 2023 at the Steppe Arena in Ulaanbaatar, Mongolia. Only athletes born between 1 January 2006 and 31 December 2008 were allowed to participate.

== Medal table ==
* Host nation (Mongolia)

Rank	Nation	Gold	Silver	Bronze	Total
1	South Korea (KOR)	4	5	1	10
2	China (CHN)	3	2	5	10
3	Japan (JPN)	3	0	1	4
4	Chinese Taipei (TPE)	1	4	3	8
5	Mongolia (MGL)	1	1	3	5
Totals (5 entries)		12	12	13	37

== Medal summary ==
=== Boys' events ===
Event	Gold	Silver	Bronze
55 kg	Lee Changhak; South Korea	Munkh-Orgil Suvd-Erdene; Mongolia	Hu Sile; China
60 kg	Lai Min-yang; Chinese Taipei	Lee Hyeonbin; South Korea	Mungunkhuyag Baatartsogt; Mongolia
66 kg	Keisho Mitsuishi; Japan	Ahn Hyunwoo; South Korea	Chao Ling-hsiang; Chinese Taipei
66 kg	Keisho Mitsuishi; Japan	Ahn Hyunwoo; South Korea	Zhang Minghao; China
73 kg	Shi Zhenyu; China	Kim Yongmin; South Korea	Tsai Kai-an; Chinese Taipei
81 kg	Zhou Haoran; China	Kim Taewoong; South Korea	Kuo Yu-cheng; Chinese Taipei
81+ kg	Katsuhiro Kaburagi; Japan	Kim Sunghoon; South Korea	Dong Hanyu; China

=== Girls' events ===
Event	Gold	Silver	Bronze
44 kg	Otgonjargal Tsogtbaatar; Mongolia	Huang Wen-I; Chinese Taipei	Lu Yaqin; China
48 kg	Lee Yoojin; South Korea	Yang Xiu-ying; Chinese Taipei	Li Xiuhong; China
52 kg	Kanae Kurata; Japan	Ji Hanrui; China	Ariunzaya Terbish; Mongolia
57 kg	Tao Yuying; China	Lin Yu-han; Chinese Taipei	Son Chaeteong; South Korea
63 kg	Yang Jieon; South Korea	Chang Ching-ying; Chinese Taipei	Maralmaa Khuderchuluun; Mongolia
63+ kg	Lee Hyeonji; South Korea	Zhang Mengdie; China	Yuna Fukushima; Japan

== Participating nations ==
50 Athletes from 6 NOCs participate in the event:

1. China (12)
2. Hong Kong (4)
3. Japan (4)
4. South Korea (12)
5. Chinese Taipei (6)
6. Mongolia (12)
