= Athletics at the 2023 East Asian Youth Games =

- Dates: 20–23 August 2023
- Host city: Ulaanbaatar, Mongolia
- Venue: Athletics field of Nalaikh District
- Level: Youth
- Events: 22
- Participation: 168 athletes from 7 nations

Athletics were held at the 2023 East Asian Youth Games from August 20 to 23, 2023, at the Athletics field of Nalaikh district in Ulaanbaatar, Mongolia. Only athletes born on 2006.01.01 – 2007.12.31 (16 – 17 years old) were allowed to participate.

== Medal table ==
* Host nation (Mongolia)

Rank	Nation	Gold	Silver	Bronze	Total
Totals (0 entries)		0	0	0	0

== Medal summary ==
=== Boys' events ===
Event	Gold		Silver		Bronze	
100 metres	Wu Haolin; China	10.60	He Jinxian; China	10.69	Chan Yat-lok; Hong Kong	10.75
200 metres	Ailixier Wumaier; China	21.29	Wesley Leung; Hong Kong	21.76	Magnus Prostur Johansson; Hong Kong	21.95
400 metres	Liu Kai; China	46.81	Zeng Keli; China	47.59	Hsiung Chen-yu; Chinese Taipei	48.46
800 metres	Mo Decai; China	1:57.30	Zheng Liang; China	1:59.01	Chiang Yi-an; Chinese Taipei	2:00.18
1500 metres	Ko Ochiai; Japan	4:08.00	Mo Decai; China	4:21.75	Zheng Liang; China	4:28.62
3000 metres						
5 km cross-country	Daiki Sasaki; Japan	16:50.92	Altansukh Sainjargal; Mongolia	19:20.43	Chingune Enkhtur; Mongolia	20:03.85
Long jump	Zhang Shengming; China		Chiu Ssu-chi; Chinese Taipei		Zhao Kun-xiang; Chinese Taipei	
Triple jump	Zhao Kun-xiang; Chinese Taipei	15.39 m	Zhou Rongjia; China	15.35 m	Zheng Wentao; China	15.18 m
Shot put	Wu Chenqi; China		Park Si-hoon; South Korea		Tserenjamts Sukh-Adiya; Mongolia	
Discus throw	Cheng Yao-kuan; Chinese Taipei	53.62 m	Choi Jae-no; South Korea	52.60 m	Wu Chenqi; China	51.59 m

=== Girls' events ===
Event	Gold		Silver		Bronze	
100 metres	Li Tsz-to; Hong Kong	11.99	Kotoha Nakano; Japan	12.09	Xia Yuting; China	12.10
200 metres	Li Tsz-to; Hong Kong	24.75	Li Jinzhu; China	25.00	Nicole Yau Sin-ting; Hong Kong	25.15
400 metres	Haruna Seta; Japan	55.70	Zhang Caixia; China	55.91	Zheng Yingchao; China	56.62
800 metres	Sari Kamei; Japan	2:11.40	Cui Shuangyan; China	2:12.18	Chen Jie-an; Chinese Taipei	2:19.63
1500 metres	Li Yuan; China	4:55.56	Shin Ye-jin; South Korea	4:58.56	Selenge Bold; Mongolia	5:40.25
3000 metres	Shin Ye-jin; South Korea	10:59.77	Delgertsetseg Gantsetseg; Mongolia	12:17.21	not awarded	
3 km cross-country	Momoko Yamada; Japan	11:10.05	Munkhjin Murun; Mongolia	12:33.83	Uranjargal Khilchin; Mongolia	16:14.84
Long jump	Wu Binbin; China	6.44 m	Wu Jialing; China	5.98 m	Jia Wai-yin; Hong Kong	5.82 m
Triple jump	Wu Jialing; China	12.60 m	Sylvia Chow; Hong Kong	11.87 m	Lim Sa-rang; South Korea	11.44 m
Shot pot	Ding Zhuhui; China		Tian Xinyi; China		not awarded	
Discus throw	Chiang Ching-yuan; Chinese Taipei	48.50 m	Lee Hye-min; South Korea	47.08 m	Xu Yeming; China	46.71 m

=== Mixed events ===
Event	Gold	Silver	Bronze
4×400 metres relay	China	Hong Kong	Mongolia

== Results ==
=== Boys ===
==== 100 m ====
===== Semifinals =====
20 August

Rank	Athlete	Time	
Heat 1
1	Chan Yat-lok (HKG)	10.85	Q
2	Wu Haolin (CHN)	10.91	Q
3	Kim Hah-yeon (KOR)	10.97	Q
4	Kushi Naruka (JPN)	11.09	q
5	Chih Hsiang-chung (TPE)	11.20	q
6	Tam Chin-seng (MAC)	11.51	
Heat 2
1	He Jinxian (CHN)	10.76	Q
2	Kim Dong-jin (KOR)	10.94	Q
3	Ting Fong James Chan (HKG)	11.01	Q
4	Lou Chi-seng (MAC)	11.49	
5	Battsengel Batkhuu (MGL)	11.87	

===== Final =====
20 August

Rank	Athlete	Time
1st place, gold medalist(s)	Hao Linwu (CHN)	10.60
2nd place, silver medalist(s)	He Jinxian (CHN)	10.69
3rd place, bronze medalist(s)	Chan Yat-lok (HKG)	10.75
4	Kim Dong-jin (KOR)	10.81
5	Kim Hah-yeon (KOR)	10.89
6	Chih Hsiang-chung (TPE)	11.05
7	Ting Fong James Chan (HKG)	11.06
8	Kushi Naruka (JPN)	11.33

==== 200 m ====
===== Semifinals =====
21 August

Rank	Athlete	Time	
Heat 1
1	Wumai Er Ailixi Er (CHN)	21.16	Q
2	Kim Dong-jin (KOR)	21.87	Q
3	Magnus Prostur Johansson (HKG)	21.91	q
4	Sarantsetseg Batzorig (MGL)	23.81	
Heat 2
1	Leung Ching Hang Wesley (HKG)	21.90	Q
2	Gong Junbo (CHN)	22.52	Q
3	Lou Chi-seng (MAC)	23.68	q
4	Won Heng-sam (MAC)	24.07	
5	Na Hyeon-su (KOR)	DNS	

===== Finals =====
22 August

Rank	Athlete	Time
1st place, gold medalist(s)	Wumai Er Ailixi Er (CHN)	21.29
2nd place, silver medalist(s)	Leung Ching Hang Wesley (HKG)	21.76
3rd place, bronze medalist(s)	Magnus Prostur Johansson (HKG)	21.95
4	Kim Dong-jin (KOR)	21.97
5	Gong Junbo (CHN)	23.10
6	Lou Chi-seng (MAC)	23.73

==== 400 m ====
===== Semifinals =====
20 August

Rank	Athlete	Time	
Heat 1
1	Zeng Keli (CHN)	47.50	Q
2	Hsiung Chen-yu (TPE)	48.68	Q
3	Na Hyeon-ju (KOR)	49.79	q
4	Wong Cheng-sam (MAC)	51.52	
5	Kwan Yik-yin (HKG)	51.57	
Heat 2
1	Liu Kai (CHN)	48.76	Q
2	Li Hao-cheng (TPE)	50.62	Q
3	Kai Ho-shum (HKG)	51.43	q
4	Sarantuya Batzorig (MGL)	54.50	

===== Finals =====
21 August

Rank	Athlete	Time
1st place, gold medalist(s)	Liu Kai (CHN)	46.81
2nd place, silver medalist(s)	Zeng Keli (CHN)	47.59
3rd place, bronze medalist(s)	Hsiung Chen-yu (TPE)	48.46
4	Li Hao-cheng (TPE)	48.47
5	Na Hyeon-ju (KOR)	49.47
6	Kai Ho-shum (HKG)	52.24

==== 800 m ====
===== Final =====
20 August

Rank	Athlete	Time
1st place, gold medalist(s)	Mo Dekai (CHN)	1:57.30
2nd place, silver medalist(s)	Zheng Liang (CHN)	1:59.01
3rd place, bronze medalist(s)	Chang Yi-an (TPE)	2:00.18
4	Kim Hong-yu (KOR)	2:01.53
5	Amgalanbaatar Aleksandr (MGL)	2:13.90
6	Batjargal Erdenetulga (MGL)	

==== 1500 m ====
===== Finals =====
22 August

==== 3000 m ====
===== Finals =====
21 August

==== Long jump ====
===== Finals =====
22 August

==== Triple jump ====
20 August

Rank	Athlete	Result
1st place, gold medalist(s)	Zhao Kun-xiang (TPE)	15.39
2nd place, silver medalist(s)	Zhou Rongjia (CHN)	15.35
3rd place, bronze medalist(s)	Zheng Wentao (CHN)	15.18
4	Kim Eun-gyo (KOR)	14.24
5	Mui Lok-yin (HKG)	13.76
6	Leung Kin-wang (HKG)	13.47
7	Munkhnairamdal Bayarmunkh (MGL)	11.43

==== Shot put ====
===== Finals =====
21 August

==== Discus throw ====
20 August

Rank	Athlete	Result
1st place, gold medalist(s)	Cheng Yao-Kuan (TPE)	61.70
2nd place, silver medalist(s)	Cho Jae-no (KOR)	59.53
3rd place, bronze medalist(s)	Wu Chenqi (CHN)	53.62
4	Sukh-Adiya Tserenjamts (MGL)	52.60
5	Jie Han (CHN)	51.59

=== Girls ===
==== 100 m ====
===== Semifinals =====
20 August

Rank	Athlete	Time	
Heat 1
1	Xia Yuting (CHN)	12.34	Q
2	Kotoha Nakano (JPN)	12.37	Q
3	Li Tsz-to (HKG)	12.44	Q
4	Lee Da-won (KOR)	12.68	q
5	Un Hoi-leng (MAC)	13.22	q
Heat 2
1	Su Wanyue (CHN)	12.42	Q
2	Huang Yu-ting (TPE)	12.48	Q
3	Wong Wan-chi (HKG)	12.63	Q
4	Bat-Erdene Oyunzul (MGL)	13.44	

===== Final =====
20 August

Rank	Athlete	Time
1st place, gold medalist(s)	Li Tsz-to (HKG)	11.99
2nd place, silver medalist(s)	Kotoha Nakano (JPN)	12.09
3rd place, bronze medalist(s)	Xia Yuting (CHN)	12.10
4	Huang Yu-ting (TPE)	12.13
5	Su Wanyue (CHN)	12.20
6	Lee Da-won (KOR)	12.40
7	Wong Wan-chi (HKG)	12.52
8	Un Hoi-leng (MAC)	13.26

==== 200 m ====
===== Semifinals =====
20 August

Rank	Athlete	Time	
Heat 1
1	Yau Sin Ting Nicole (HKG)	25.16	Q
2	Li Jinzhu (CHN)	25.40	Q
3	Bat-Erdene Oyunzul (MGL)	27.72	q
4	Un Hoi-leng (MAC)	28.57	
Heat 2
1	Yang Jiayi (CHN)	25.12	Q
2	Li Tsz-to (HKG)	26.44	Q
3	Lee Da-won (KOR)	26.89	q

==== 400 m ====
===== Semifinals =====
20 August

Rank	Athlete	Time	
Heat 1
1	Haruna Seta (JPN)	55.86	Q
2	Zheng Yingchao (CHN)	57.00	Q
3	Jane Christa Ming Suet Karlsson (HKG)	57.03	q
4	Jargalsaikhan Narangarav (JPN)	1:05.13	
Heat 2
1	Zhang Caixia (CHN)	56.74	Q
2	Liu Chen-yu (TPE)	57.64	Q
3	Chow Chi-kiu (HKG)	58.05	q
4	Lee Min-kyung (KOR)	58.39	
5	Enkhtur Nomin (MGL)		

===== Finals =====
21 August

Rank	Athlete	Time
1st place, gold medalist(s)	Haruna Seta (JPN)	55.70
2nd place, silver medalist(s)	Zhang Caixia (CHN)	55.91
3rd place, bronze medalist(s)	Zheng Yingchao (CHN)	56.62
4	Jane Christa Ming Suet Karlsson (HKG)	56.68
5	Liu Chen-yu (TPE)	57.31
6	Chow Chi-kiu (HKG)	58.58

==== 800 m ====
===== Final =====
20 August

Rank	Athlete	Time
1st place, gold medalist(s)	Sari Kamei (JPN)	2:11.40
2nd place, silver medalist(s)	Cui Shuangyan (CHN)	2:12.18
3rd place, bronze medalist(s)	Chen Jie-an (TPE)	2:19.63
4	Lee Hee-su (KOR)	2:20.82
5	Jin Shin-ye (KOR)	2:20.83
6	Jargalsaikhan Narangarav (MGL)	2:35.30

==== 1500 m ====
===== Finals =====
22 August

==== 3000 m ====
===== Finals =====
21 August

==== Long jump ====
===== Finals =====
20 August

==== Triple jump ====
===== Finals =====
21 August

==== Shot put ====
===== Finals =====
22 August

==== Discus throw ====
===== Finals =====
21 August

== Participating nations ==
168 Athletes from 7 NOCs participated in the event:

1. China (56)
2. Hong Kong (23)
3. Japan (9)
4. South Korea (30)
5. Macau (11)
6. Chinese Taipei (13)
7. Mongolia (28)
