= Sumayah Sugapong =

Filipino-American basketball player (born 2005)

No. 3 – Arizona Wildcats
- Position: Guard

Personal information
- Born: December 1, 2005 (age 20) San Diego, California, U.S.
- Listed height: 5 ft 8 in (1.73 m)

Career information
- College: UC San Diego (2023–25); Arizona (2025–)

Sumayah Sugapong (born December 1, 2005) is a Filipino-American college basketball player for the Arizona Wildcats and the Philippines women's national basketball team.

== Early life and education ==
Sumayah Sugapong was born on December 1, 2005 in San Diego, California, to Nada and Gino Sugapong. She has younger three sisters single younger brother. She initially took up soccer in her childhood but was convinced to focus on basketball by her eventual high school teammate Naomi Panganiban. They have been childhood friends since they first met in a basketball club in elementary school.

She studied at the La Jolla Country Day School for high school. She later attended Sixth College before moving to the University of California, San Diego, in 2023. In 2025, she committed to move to the University of Arizona.

== Career ==
=== College ===
Sugapong played for the UC San Diego Tritons in her first two years of college. She later moved to the Arizona Wildcats.

=== National team ===
Sugapong has played for the Philippine national team. She played for the under-18 girls team at the 2022 FIBA U18 Women's Asian Championship She later suited up for the senior team at the 2025 FIBA Women's Asia Cup and the 2026 FIBA Women's Basketball World Cup Qualifying Tournament in France.
