= Table tennis at the 2023 East Asian Youth Games =

Tournament details
- Dates: 17–21 August
- Edition: 1st
- Competitors: 64 from 7 nations
- Venue: Gan Sports Center
- Location: Ulaanbaatar, Mongolia

Table Tennis was held at the 2023 East Asian Youth Games during August 17 to 21, 2023, at the Gan Sports Center in Ulaanbaatar, Mongolia. Only athletes born on 2005.01.01 – 2008.12.31 were allowed to participate.

== Medal table ==
* Host nation (Mongolia)

Rank	Nation	Gold	Silver	Bronze	Total
1	China (CHN)	3	3	1	7
2	South Korea (KOR)	3	2	3	8
3	Chinese Taipei (TPE)	1	1	4	6
4	Japan (JPN)	0	1	4	5
Totals (4 entries)		7	7	12	26

== Medal summary ==
Event	Gold	Silver	Bronze
Men's singles	Huang Youzheng; China	Wen Ruibo; China	Kim Gaon; South Korea
Men's singles	Huang Youzheng; China	Wen Ruibo; China	Yang Hao-jen; Chinese Taipei
Women's singles	Lee Daeun; South Korea	Kim Seongjin; South Korea	Yeh Yi-tian; Chinese Taipei
Women's singles	Lee Daeun; South Korea	Kim Seongjin; South Korea	Sachi Aoki; Japan
Men's doubles	Lee Hoyun; Kim Gaon; South Korea	Yang Hao-jen; Yang Chia-an; Chinese Taipei	Huang Youzheng; Wen Ruibo; China
Men's doubles	Lee Hoyun; Kim Gaon; South Korea	Yang Hao-jen; Yang Chia-an; Chinese Taipei	Kazuki Yoshiyama; Tamito Watanabe; Japan
Women's doubles	Peng Yu-han; Chang Pei-shan; Chinese Taipei	Wang Yiduo; Wang Xiaonan; China	Sachi Aoki; Misuzu Takeya; Japan
Women's doubles	Peng Yu-han; Chang Pei-shan; Chinese Taipei	Wang Yiduo; Wang Xiaonan; China	Saya Yamamuro; Senri Tsukasa; Japan
Mixed doubles	Huang Youzheng; Wang Yiduo; China	Wen Ruibo; Yan Yutong; China	Lee Hoyun; Lee Daeun; South Korea
Mixed doubles	Huang Youzheng; Wang Yiduo; China	Wen Ruibo; Yan Yutong; China	Lee Donghyeok; Yoo Yerin; South Korea
Men's team	China; Kang Youde; Wang Jixuan; Shi Cancheng; Wen Ruibo; Huang Youzheng	South Korea; Kim Minwoo; Lee Donghyeok; Lee Hoyun	Chinese Taipei; Huang Jing-kai; Yang Chia-an; Kuo Guan-hong; Hsu Hsien-chia; Yang Hao-jen
Women's team	South Korea; Ban Eunjung; Yoo Yerin; Lee Seungmi; Kim Seongjin	Japan; Sachi Aoki; Misuzu Takeya; Saya Yamamuro; Senri Tsukasa	Chinese Taipei; Chang Pei-shan; Peng Yu-han; Yeh Yi-tian; Liu Ru-yun

== Participating nations ==
64 Athletes from 7 NOCs participate in the event:

1. China (10)
2. Hong Kong (10)
3. South Korea (10)
4. Japan (8)
5. Macau (6)
6. Chinese Taipei (10)
7. Mongolia (10)
