= Boxing at the 2023 East Asian Youth Games =

- Dates: 17–19 August 2023
- Host city: Ulaanbaatar, Mongolia
- Venue: Bökhiin Örgöö
- Level: Youth
- Events: 10
- Participation: 38 athletes from 5 nations

Boxing was held at the 2023 East Asian Youth Games from August 17 to 19, 2023, at Bökhiin Örgöö in Ulaanbaatar, Mongolia. Only athletes born on 2005.01.01 – 2006.12.31 were allowed to participate.

== Medal table ==
* Host nation (Mongolia)

Rank	Nation	Gold	Silver	Bronze	Total
1	China (CHN)	6	2	2	10
2	Japan (JPN)	3	1	3	7
3	Mongolia (MGL)	1	4	5	10
4	South Korea (KOR)	0	3	4	7
5	Chinese Taipei (TPE)	0	0	4	4
Totals (5 entries)		10	10	18	38

== Medal summary ==
=== Boys' events ===
Event	Gold	Silver	Bronze
46–48 kg	Mo Changning; China	Jo Hyeonwoo; South Korea	Tuvshinzaya Otgonbayar; Mongolia
46–48 kg	Mo Changning; China	Jo Hyeonwoo; South Korea	Ryota Ajiki; Japan
48–51 kg	Zhang Hanrui; China	Tugsbileg Enkhtur; Mongolia	Jin Juan; South Korea
48–51 kg	Zhang Hanrui; China	Tugsbileg Enkhtur; Mongolia	Jo Oikawa; Japan
51–54 kg	Oyun-Erdene Enkhsaikhan; Mongolia	Huang Jiahao; China	
54–57 kg	Fuma Kumamoto; Japan	Zhu Jinda; China	Lin Yi-cheng; Chinese Taipei
54–57 kg	Fuma Kumamoto; Japan	Zhu Jinda; China	Munkh-Erdene Erdenebold; Mongolia
57–60 kg	Shoma Okumura; Japan	Moon Gyubin; South Korea	Fu Lyucheng; China
57–60 kg	Shoma Okumura; Japan	Moon Gyubin; South Korea	Altangerel Uuganbayar; Mongolia
60–63.5 kg	Han Jiachao; China	Baasandash Ulemj; Mongolia	Lee Minjae; South Korea
60–63.5 kg	Han Jiachao; China	Baasandash Ulemj; Mongolia	Keisuke Akimoto; Japan
63.5–67 kg	Ryuki Waga; Japan	Park Seonghun; South Korea	Daerhan Nuerheman; China
63.5–67 kg	Ryuki Waga; Japan	Park Seonghun; South Korea	Ochirdari Batzaya; Mongolia

=== Girls' events ===
Event	Gold	Silver	Bronze
48–51 kg	Liu Qianfang; China	Saruul Batsaikhan; Mongolia	An Subin; South Korea
48–51 kg	Liu Qianfang; China	Saruul Batsaikhan; Mongolia	Chi Ya-chen; Chinese Taipei
52–54 kg	Xu Rong; China	Miku Oikawa; Japan	Wang Tsai-wei; Chinese Taipei
52–54 kg	Xu Rong; China	Miku Oikawa; Japan	Nomundari Enkhamgalan; Mongolia
57–60 kg	Li Qianwei; China	Gerelsaikhan Davaa; Mongolia	Li Yi-chun; Chinese Taipei
57–60 kg	Li Qianwei; China	Gerelsaikhan Davaa; Mongolia	Park Hyeji; South Korea

== Participating nations ==
38 Athletes from 5 NOCs participate in the event:

1. China (10)
2. Japan (7)
3. South Korea (7)
4. Chinese Taipei (4)
5. Mongolia (10)
