= Bökhiin Örgöö =

Sports complex in Bayanzürkh, Ulaanbaatar, Mongolia

Wrestling Palace
- Бөхийн Өргөө
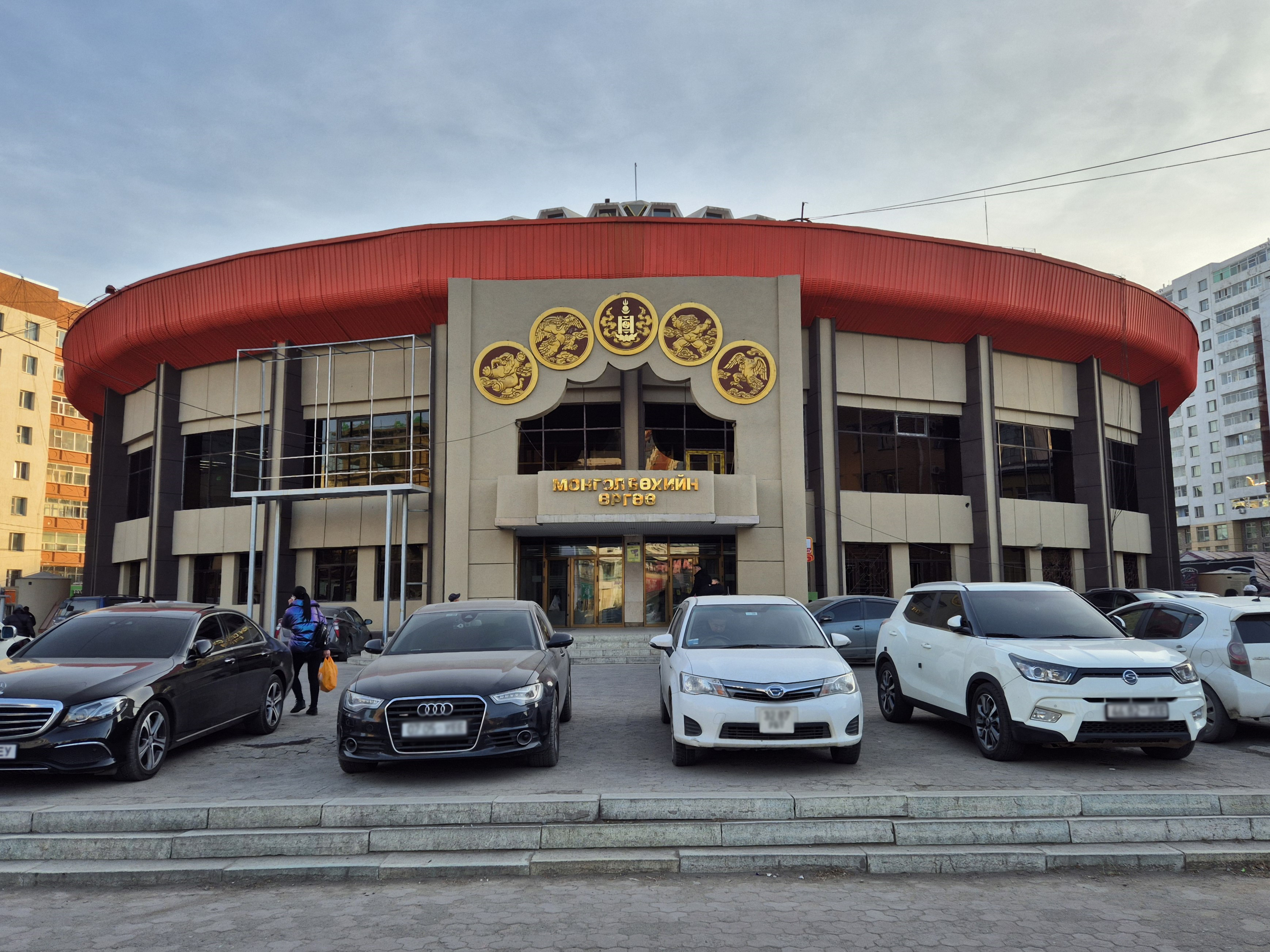
- Interactive map of Wrestling Palace
- Address: Bayanzürkh; Ulaanbaatar; Mongolia
- Coordinates: 47°55′04.3″N 106°56′06.8″E
- Capacity: 2,500 seats

Bökhiin Örgöö or Bokhiin Orgoo (Mongolian: Бөхийн Өргөө), literally meaning "Wrestling Palace" in the Mongolian language, is a sports complex (arena) in Bayanzürkh District, Ulaanbaatar, Mongolia that is home to the Mongolian wrestling competitions and also hosts music concerts under a lease.

== Architecture ==
The building was constructed with the shape of a yurt. It has a capacity of 2,500 seats.

== Events ==
- 2001 Asian Wrestling Championships
- 2006 East Asian Judo Championships
- 2007 Asian Amateur Boxing Championships
- Boxing at the 2023 East Asian Youth Games

== See also ==
- National Sports Stadium (Mongolia)
