= Jordan women's national under-18 basketball team =

Jordan
- FIBA zone: FIBA Asia
- National federation: Jordan Basketball Federation

U19 World Cup
- Appearances: None

U18 Asia Cup
- Appearances: 2
- Medals: None

U18 Asia Cup Division B
- Appearances: 1
- Medals: None

The Jordan women's national under-18 basketball team is a national basketball team of Jordan, administered by the Jordan Basketball Federation. It represents the country in international under-18 women's basketball competitions.

== FIBA Under-18 Women's Asia Cup participations ==
| Year | Division A | Division B |
|---|---|---|
| 1996 | 8th | |
| 2014 | 11th | |
| 2022 | | 6th |

== See also ==
- Jordan women's national basketball team
- Jordan women's national under-16 basketball team
- Jordan men's national under-19 basketball team
