= Louna Ozar =

Filipina-French basketball player

UP Fighting Maroons
- League: UAAP

Personal information
- Born: May 9, 2004 (age 22) France
- Listed height: 1.72 m (5 ft 8 in)

Career information
- College: UP

Louna Ozar (May 9, 2004) is a Filipina–French basketball player.

== Early life ==
Louna Ozar was born on May 9, 2004. She grew up in France with her hometown being Willems, Nord.

She was born to Leo Ozar, a Filipino man and Anne, a Frenchwoman. Her father hails from Camiguin who emigrated to France in 1995 while her mother had a history of working in the Philippines in the early 1990s. Louna Ozar is the youngest of three children. Like her brothers, she took up basketball at a young age first playing the sport at age four.

== Career ==
=== Youth ===
Ozar had played for the junior team of the ESB Villeneuve-d'Ascq, specifically the under-18 and under-20 squads.

=== Collegiate ===
In April 2023, Ozar has committed to play for the UP Fighting Maroons. She made her University Athletic Association of the Philippines (UAAP) debut at the Season 86 in October 2023. Ozar helped the team reach the Final Four for the first time since 2008.

=== National team ===
Ozar was set to play for France in the 2020 FIBA U16 Women's EuroBasket in Portugal but the tournament was cancelled due to the COVID-19 pandemic.

The Philippine national team under head coach Patrick Aquino has been in contact with Ozar since 2019. Ozar obtained a Philippine passport in 2020, making her eligible to play for the Philippines. She debuted at the youth level, and played at the 2022 FIBA U18 Women's Asian Championship Division B. For the senior team, she has played at the 2022 Asian Games, 2023 FIBA Women's Asia Cup, and 2023 William Jones Cup.
