= Wrestling at the 2023 East Asian Youth Games =

Wrestling competition in Ulaanbaatar, Mongolia

- Dates: 21–22 August 2023
- Host city: Ulaanbaatar, Mongolia
- Venue: AIC Steppe Arena
- Level: Youth
- Events: 12
- Participation: 53 athletes from 5 nations

Wrestling was held at the 2023 East Asian Youth Games from August 21 to 22, 2023, at AIC Steppe Arena in Ulaanbaatar, Mongolia. Only athletes born on 2006.01.01 – 2007.12.31 were allowed to participate.

== Medal table ==
* Host nation (Mongolia)

Rank	Nation	Gold	Silver	Bronze	Total
1	Japan (JPN)	10	2	0	12
2	China (CHN)	2	6	1	9
3	Mongolia (MGL)	0	3	5	8
4	South Korea (KOR)	0	1	4	5
5	Chinese Taipei (TPE)	0	0	2	2
Totals (5 entries)		12	12	12	36

== Medal summary ==
=== Boys' events ===
Event	Gold	Silver	Bronze
48 kg	Yamato Furusawa; Japan	Uuganbayar Buyankhishig; Mongolia	Song Mingjie; China
51 kg	Yamato Ogawa; Japan	Liu Jianhao; China	Myervyet Amarbyek; Mongolia
55 kg	Ariya Yoshida; Japan	Wang Chengtao; China	Bak Inseong; South Korea
60 kg	Akito Maehara; Japan	Davaadorj Ariunbold; Mongolia	Park Gyutae; South Korea
65 kg	Keywan Gharehdaghi; Japan	Altangerel Ankh-Erdene; Mongolia	Kim Juyoung; South Korea
80 kg	Natsura Okazawa; Japan	Lee Kangyoon; South Korea	Enkhbat Byambadorj; Mongolia

=== Girls' events ===
Event	Gold	Silver	Bronze
43 kg	Mona Ezaka; Japan	An Xiuling; China	Erdenetogtokh Davaadulam; Mongolia
46 kg	Natsumi Masuda; Japan	Lu Meilan; China	Khulan Boldbaatar; Mongolia
49 kg	Zhang Yu; China	Rinka Ogawa; Japan	Chuluun-Erdene Battogtogh; Mongolia
53 kg	Sakura Onishi; Japan	Zhang Jin; China	Tseng Yi-Hsuan; Chinese Taipei
57 kg	Sowaka Uchida; Japan	Zhu Yifan; China	Min Yeojin; South Korea
65 kg	Han Shuang; China	Chisato Yoshida; Japan	Li Yen-yi; Chinese Taipei

== Participating nations ==
53 Athletes from 5 NOCs participate in the event:

1. China (12)
2. Japan (12)
3. South Korea (11)
4. Chinese Taipei (6)
5. Mongolia (12)
