= Japan at the 2023 East Asian Youth Games =

- IOC code: JPN
- NOC: Japanese Olympic Committee
- Website: www.joc.or.jp

in Ulaanbaatar, Mongolia August 16 – 23
- Competitors: 48 in 7 sports
- Medals Ranked 2nd: Gold 22 Silver 6 Bronze 13 Total 41

East Asian Youth Games appearances
- auto

Japan participated in the 2023 East Asian Youth Games in Ulaanbaatar, Mongolia on 16–23 August 2023. The nation sent 48 athletes competing in 7 sports. Japan finished second in the medal table with 22 gold medals, 6 silver medals and 13 bronze medals. 42 of the 48 delegated athletes won medals.

== Medal summary ==
=== Medal by sports ===
Rank	Sports	Gold	Silver	Bronze	Total
1	Wrestling	10	2	0	12
2	Athletics	5	1	1	7
3	Boxing	3	1	3	7
4	Judo	3	0	1	4
5	Esports	1	0	1	2
6	Table tennis	0	1	4	5
7	Taekwondo	0	1	3	4
Totals (7 entries)		22	6	13	41

=== Medalists ===
Medal	Name	Sport	Event	Date
Gold	Keisho Mitsuishi	Judo	Boys' -66 kg	August 17
Gold	Kanae Kurata	Judo	Girls' -52 kg	August 17
Gold	Katsuhiro Kaburagi	Judo	Boys' +81 kg	August 18
Gold	Fuma Kumamoto	Boxing	Boys' 54–57 kg	August 19
Gold	Shoma Okumura	Boxing	Boys' 57–60 kg	August 19
Gold	Ryuki Waga	Boxing	Boys' 63.5–67 kg	August 19
Gold	Riku Saito	Esports	The King of Fighter XV	August 19
Gold	Sari Kamei	Athletics	Girls' 800 m	August 20
Gold	Haruna Seta	Athletics	Girls' 400 m	August 21
Gold	Mona Ezaka	Wrestling	Girls' 43 kg	August 21
Gold	Sowaka Uchida	Wrestling	Girls' 57 kg	August 21
Gold	Yamato Furusawa	Wrestling	Boys' 48 kg	August 21
Gold	Ariya Yoshida	Wrestling	Boys' 55 kg	August 21
Gold	Keyvan Gharehdaghi	Wrestling	Boys' 65 kg	August 21
Gold	Ko Ochiai	Athletics	Boys' 1500 m	August 22
Gold	Natsumi Masuda	Wrestling	Girls' 46 kg	August 22
Gold	Sakura Onishi	Wrestling	Girls' 53 kg	August 22
Gold	Yamato Ogawa	Wrestling	Boys' 51 kg	August 22
Gold	Akito Maehara	Wrestling	Boys' 60 kg	August 22
Gold	Natsura Okazawa	Wrestling	Boys' 80 kg	August 22
Gold	Momoko Yamada	Athletics	Girls' cross-country 5 km	August 22
Gold	Daiki Sasaki	Athletics	Boys' cross-country 5 km	August 22
Silver	Misuzu Takeya; Saya Yamamuro; Senri Tsukasa; Sachi Aoki	Table tennis	Girls' team	August 18
Silver	Miku Oikawa	Boxing	Girls' 52–54 kg	August 19
Silver	Riku Takamaru	Taekwondo	Boys' 48 kg	August 19
Silver	Kotoha Nakano	Athletics	Girls' 100 m	August 20
Silver	Rinka Ogawa	Wrestling	Girls' 49 kg	August 21
Silver	Chisato Yoshida	Wrestling	Girls' 65 kg	August 22
Bronze	Yuna Fukushima	Judo	Girls' +63 kg	August 18
Bronze	Otoa Ishida	Taekwondo	Girls' 49–55 kg	August 19
Bronze	Takato Kato	Taekwondo	Boys' 55–63 kg	August 19
Bronze	Jo Oikawa	Boxing	Boys' 48–51 kg	August 19
Bronze	Ryota Ajiki	Boxing	Boys' 46–48 kg	August 19
Bronze	Keisuke Akimoto	Boxing	Boys' 60–63.5 kg	August 19
Bronze	Haruki Arai	Esports	The King of Fighter XV	August 19
Bronze	Ion Kondo	Athletics	Girls' long jump	August 20
Bronze	Ruka Okamoto	Taekwondo	Girls' 44–49 kg	August 20
Bronze	Sachi Aoki	Table tennis	Girls' singles	August 21
Bronze	Sachi Aoki; Misuzu Takeya	Table tennis	Girls' doubles	August 21
Bronze	Saya Yamamuro; Senri Tsukasa	Table tennis	Girls' doubles	August 21
Bronze	Kazuki Yoshiyama; Tamito Watanabe	Table tennis	Boys' doubles	August 21

== Athletics ==
Momoko Yamada
Ion Kondo
Sari Kamei
Haruna Seta
Kotoha Nakano
Daiki Sasaki
Ko Ochiai
Wakushi Narukawa

== Boxing ==
Miku Oikawa
Amu Ota
Ryuki Waga
Keisuke Akimoto
Shoma Okumura
Fuma Kumamoto
Jo Oikawa
Ryota Ajiki

== Esports ==
Riku Saito
Haruki Arai

== Judo ==
Keisho Mitsuishi
Kanae Kurata
Yuna Fukushima
Katsuhiro Kaburagi

== Table Tennis ==
Misuzu Takeya
Saya Yamamuro
Senri Tsukasa
Sachi Aoki
Takumi Tanimoto
Daito Masaki
Tamito Watanabe
Kazuki Yoshiyama

== Taekwondo ==
Otoa Ishida
Ruka Okamoto
Koharu Suzuki
Takato Kato
Ryusei Ohara
Riku Takamaru

== Wrestling ==
Chisato Yoshida
Sowaka Uchida
Sakura Onishi
Rinka Ogawa
Natsumi Masuda
Mona Ezaka
Natsura Okazawa
Keyvan Gharehdaghi
Akito Maehara
Ariya Yoshida
Yamato Ogawa
Yamato Furusawa
