= Esports at the 2023 East Asian Youth Games =

- Dates: 18–19 August 2023
- Host city: Ulaanbaatar, Mongolia
- Venue: Central Cultural Palace
- Level: Youth
- Events: 2

Esports were held at the 2023 East Asian Youth Games from 18 to 19 August 2023, at the Central Cultural Palace in Ulaanbaatar, Mongolia.

== Age Requirements ==
- VR Tennis: Players born on 1 January 2005 to 31 December 2009.
- The King of Fighter XV: Players born on 1 January 2005 to 31 December 2008.
- Dota 2: Players born on 1 January 2005 to 31 December 2008 (match abandoned).

== Medal table ==
* Host nation (Mongolia)

Rank	Nation	Gold	Silver	Bronze	Total
1	Chinese Taipei (TPE)	1	1	0	2
2	Japan (JPN)	1	0	1	2
3	Mongolia (MGL)	0	1	1	2
Totals (3 entries)		2	2	2	6

== Medal summary ==
=== Mixed events ===
Event	Gold	Silver	Bronze
VR Tennis	Tsai Kai-cheng; Chinese Taipei	Cheng Chi-hao; Chinese Taipei	Mandakh Davaadash; Mongolia
The King of Fighter XV	Riku Saito; Japan	Batsaruul Jambal; Mongolia	Haruki Arai; Japan

== Participating nations ==
1. Hong Kong
2. Japan
3. Chinese Taipei
4. Mongolia
