= National Amusement Park =

Amusement park in Sükhbaatar, Ulaanbaatar, Mongolia

National Amusement Park Үндэсний соёл амралтын хүрээлэн (Mongolian)
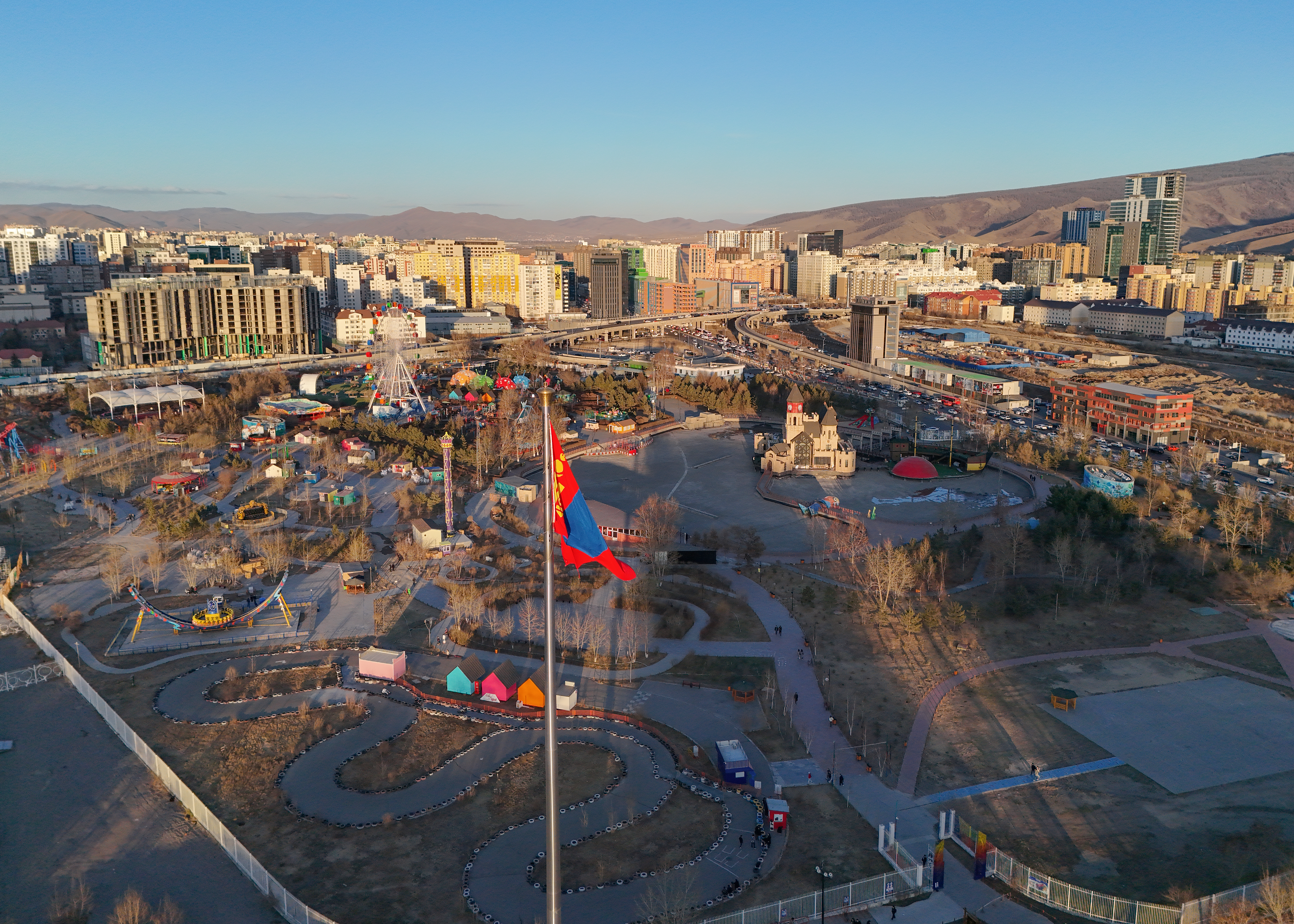
- Interactive map of National Amusement Park Үндэсний соёл амралтын хүрээлэн (Mongolian)
- Location: Sükhbaatar, Ulaanbaatar, Mongolia
- Coordinates: 47°54′35.5″N 106°55′18.9″E
- Status: Operating
- Opened: 1969

The National Amusement Park (Mongolian: Үндэсний соёл амралтын хүрээлэн) is an amusement park in Sükhbaatar District, Ulaanbaatar, Mongolia.

== History ==
The park was opened in 1969. On 5 July 2005, the governor and mayor of Ulaanbaatar City Government issued a decree on granting a 15-year lease of land to the amusement park.

== Architecture ==
The park includes a castle, roller coaster, games, paddle boats and haunted house. Currently, it has 24 rides in total. It also features an ice skating rink during winter.

== Rides and attractions ==
The park has 1 currently operating roller coaster, and 1 defunct coaster.

Ride	Season		Manufacturer	Description
Ride	Opened	Closed	Manufacturer	Description
Jijig Galzo Holgana	2010	2021-2022	Mite Mouse	A children's steel roller coaster that operated from 2010 to 2021-2022. It featured a compact and mild layout consisting of a many small turns and drawn out elements.
Toirog Zam	2013	Operating	Hebei Zhongye Metallurgical Equipment Manufacturing Co., Ltd	A steel roller coaster that began operating in 2013. The track resembles that of an Arrow Dynamics coaster. The layout features 3 inversions, with 2 back-to-back vertical loops and 1 corkscrew.

== See also ==
- Tourism in Mongolia
