= 2023 East Asian Youth Games =

- Host city: Ulaanbaatar, Mongolia
- Nations: 7
- Athletes: 1,112
- Events: 88 in 11 sports
- Opening: 16 August 2023
- Closing: 23 August 2023
- Opened by: D. Sumiyabazar, mayor of Ulaanbaatar
- Athlete's Oath: N. Anujin
- Judge's Oath: Boldbat
- Main venue: National Central Stadium
- Website: https://www.ulaanbaatar2023.org/en

The 2023 East Asian Youth Games (Mongolian: "Улаанбаатар-2023" Зүүн Азийн залуучуудын наадам) was the first edition of the East Asian Youth Games. The games was held in Ulaanbaatar, Mongolia from 16 to 23 August 2023.

== Developments and preparations ==
In March 2023, the organizing committee of the games held a meeting with the purpose of intensifying preparation of the Games and key issues like emergency situation preparations, opening ceremony safety issues, volunteers training etc., are discussed and addressed in the meetings.

=== Marketing ===
==== Mascot ====
The organizing committee announced the mascot in November 2022. The mascots are two mythical birds, a khangardi mascot was named “Khaki” and a galbingaa was named “Inga”. The logo is inspired from the upper frame of the Mongol ger, which symbolizes “Let's unite under the roof of Ulaanbaatar”.

== Venues ==
The following venues will be used for the competition.

- National Central Stadium – Opening ceremony / 12,500
- Athletics field of Nalaikh district – Athletics / 3,000
- Futsal Hall of MFF – Badminton / 640
- UG Arena – Basketball / 3,000
- National Amusement Park – Basketball 3x3, 600
- Wrestling Palace – Boxing / 2,500
- Central Cultural Palace – Esports / 1,300
- MFF Football Centre – Football / 5,000
- Steppe Arena – Judo, Taekwondo, Wrestling / 2,600
- Gan Sports Center – Table tennis / 300
- Buyant Ukhaa Sport Palace – Volleyball / 5,000
- Sukhbaatar Square – Closing ceremony / 20,000

== Participating nations/regions ==
7 National Olympic Committees participated in the competition.

- China
- Chinese Taipei
- Hong Kong
- Japan (48)
- Macau
- Mongolia (Host)
- South Korea

== Games ==
=== Sports ===
A total of 11 sports will be contested in the games:

- Athletics (22) ()
- Badminton (5) ()
- Basketball
  - Basketball (2) ()
  - 3x3 basketball (2) ()
- Boxing (10) ()
- Esports (2) ()
- Football (2) ()
- Judo (12) ()
- Table tennis (7) ()
- Taekwondo (10) ()
- Volleyball (2) ()
- Wrestling (12) ()

== Calendar ==
Calendar of the games was published in July.

All times and dates use Mongolian Standard Time (UTC+8)

OC	Opening ceremony	●	Event competitions	1	Gold medal events	CC	Closing ceremony

Event/Date		August								Events
Event/Date		16 Wed	17 Thu	18 Fri	19 Sat	20 Sun	21 Mon	22 Tue	23 Wed	Events
Ceremonies			OC						CC	
Athletics						7	6	7	2	22
Badminton			●	●	1	4				5
Basketball
Basketball	Basketball				●	●	●	1	1	2
Basketball	3x3 basketball		●	2						2
Boxing		●	●	●	10					10
Esports				1	1					2
Football			●	●	●	●	1	1		2
Judo			6	6						12
Table tennis			●	2	●	●	5			7
Taekwondo					6	4				10
Volleyball				●	●	●	1	1		2
Wrestling							6	6		12
Daily medal events			6	11	18	15	19	16	3	88
Cumulative total			6	17	35	50	69	85	88	88
Event/Date		August								Events
Event/Date		16 Wed	17 Thu	18 Fri	19 Sat	20 Sun	21 Mon	22 Tue	23 Wed	Events

== Medal table ==
As of 23 August 2023

* Host nation (Mongolia)

2023 East Asian Youth Games medal table
Rank	Nation	Gold	Silver	Bronze	Total
1	China (CHN)	38	32	19	89
2	Japan (JPN)	22	7	11	40
3	South Korea (KOR)	11	21	24	56
4	Chinese Taipei (TPE)	11	10	21	42
5	Mongolia (MGL)*	3	13	29	45
6	Hong Kong (HKG)	3	5	12	20
Totals (6 entries)		88	88	116	292
