= Manmeet Kaur =

Pakistani journalist and social worker

- Education: Jinnah College for Women, Peshawar.
- Occupations: Journalist, social worker
- Organization: HUM TV
- Awards: 100 most influential Sikh personalities under 30

Manmeet Kaur is a Pakistani journalist and social worker. She is the first Sikh journalist from Pakistan and the first to be nominated for the 100 most influential Sikh personalities under 30.

== Personal life ==
Kaur belongs to Peshawar in the province of KPK, Pakistan. Manmeet has four siblings. Her father was a retired businessman. She holds a postgraduate degree in social sciences from the Jinnah College for Women, Peshawar. Manmeet is married and has one child.

== Career ==
Initially Manmeet wanted to be a model and was aspiring to become the first Sikh model of Pakistan. However, Manmeet says that she wanted to cover many social and cultural issues for the Sikh community in Pakistan and she chose journalism as a career. She was inspired by her uncles Rajesh Tony Singh to pursue journalism. When Manmeet started her career in journalism, her family was not supportive of her. They said it was not appropriate for women to work outside of their homes. However, Manmeet's focus on covering stories of the Sikh community eventually made her people happy and soon she had the support of her community.

Prior to her work as a journalist, Manmeet worked as an administrator at a computer academy for three years.

In 2018, she joined a privately run news channel "HUM TV", where she became the first Sikh woman journalist in Pakistan. She is also an activist and has worked in covering stories of the Sikh minority community in Pakistan and advocating women's rights.

== Awards ==
In 2020, Manmeet Singh, at the age of 25, was named by the UK based International Sikh religious organization, "The Sikh group" in its list of the 100 most influential Sikh personalities under 30. She was among the two Sikhs nominated from Pakistan for the prestigious awards. The award is given to the special contributions made by Sikhs in the fields of business, sport, charity, media, entertainment, education, selfless voluntary service, lifetime achievement and the special recognition award, which is given to someone from another faith promoting multiculturalism. Many celebrities such as Ammy Virk, Guru Randhawa, Sidhu Moosewala, Sonam Bajwa and Jass Manak were also included in the 2020 list.

Manmeet will receive the award next year at a ceremony in Britain.

Speaking to a news reporter, Manmeet said, "Those who work hard will reap the rewards and it is a great honor for my family to visit the UK and represent Pakistan,"

She has also been awarded many local awards for highlighting issues faced by minorities and women.

Manmeet said The Sikh Group is a global organization which awards people from Sikh religion from different parts of the world who serve the people in different ways. She said she has worked for promotion of inter-faith harmony and rights of minorities in Pakistan. Manmeet said her nomination for the award will encourage other women to work hard in their respective fields and serve humanity.
