= East Asian Youth Games =

Continental multi-sport event

- Abbreviation: EAYG
- Purpose: Multi-sport event for nations of East Asia
- Frequency: Every 4 years
- Inaugurated: 2023 East Asian Youth Games

The East Asian Youth Games (EAYG) is a continental multi-sport event organised by the East Asian Olympic Committee (EAOC) and held every four years since 2023 among athletes from East Asian countries and territories of the Olympic Council of Asia (OCA), as well as the Pacific island of Guam, which is a member of the Oceania National Olympic Committees.

The East Asian Youth Games is currently the only Games held by the East Asian Olympic Committee without a special edition for disabilities (Para Games).

== History ==
=== 2017 East Asian Games (canceled) ===
The 2017 East Asian Games was scheduled to take place in Fukuoka, Japan, but was later scrapped and was scheduled to make a new event in 2019. (It was supposed to be the 2019 East Asian Youth Games, in Taichung, Taiwan) before it was canceled.

=== 2019 East Asian Youth Games (canceled) ===
On July 24, 2018, the East Asian Olympic Committee (EAOC) held an impromptu meeting at the request of the People's Republic of China (PRC) to revoke the hosting rights of Taichung in Taiwan, citing recent referendum movement in Taiwan to change its name from "Chinese Taipei" to "Taiwan" for 2020 Summer Olympics. The vote against Taiwan passed 6 against 1 with PRC, Hong Kong, Macau, Mongolia, North Korea and South Korea in favor, while Taiwan was against the vote, and Japan abstaining. The move by PRC is considered as politically motivated and is part of the PRC government's aggressive schemes to diminish the presence of Taiwan on the international arena.

=== 2023 East Asian Youth Games - Ulaanbaatar, Mongolia ===
The second East Asian Youth Games was held in Ulaanbaatar, Mongolia from 16 to 23 August 2023. Over 1,112 from 7 countries competed in the games.

== Participants ==
All 9 countries and territories whose National Olympic Committee is recognized by the East Asian Olympic Committee and Guam is the observer recognized by the EAOC.

- China
- Guam^{1}
- Hong Kong, China
- Japan
- Macau, China
- Mongolia
- North Korea
- South Korea
- Chinese Taipei

^{1} Associate member

== Editions ==
Edition	Year	Host city	Host nation	Opened by	Start Date	End Date	Nations	Athletes	Sports	Events	Top Placed Team	Ref.
-	2019	Taichung	Taiwan	Originally awarded to Taichung, cancelled by East Asian Olympic Committee (EAOC)								
1	2023	Ulaanbaatar	Mongolia	D. Sumiyabazar	16.Aug	23.Aug	7	1500	11	88	China (CHN)	
2	2027	TBA	TBA		TBA	TBA	TBA		TBA			

== Sports ==
Sport	Years
Athletics	since 2023
Boxing	since 2023
Badminton	since 2023
Basketball	since 2023
Cycling	TBA
Diving	TBA
Esports	since 2023
Football	since 2023
Judo	since 2023
Swimming	TBA
Table tennis	since 2023
Taekwondo	since 2023
Triathlon	TBA
Volleyball	since 2023
Wrestling	since 2023

== All-time medal table ==
Rank	Nation	Gold	Silver	Bronze	Total
1	China (CHN)	38	32	19	89
2	Japan (JPN)	22	7	11	40
3	South Korea (KOR)	11	21	24	56
4	Chinese Taipei (TPE)	11	10	21	42
5	Mongolia (MGL)	3	13	29	45
6	Hong Kong (HKG)	3	5	12	20
Totals (6 entries)		88	88	116	292

== See also ==
- Events of the OCA (Continental)
  - Asian Games
  - Asian Winter Games
  - Asian Youth Games
  - Asian Beach Games
  - Asian Indoor and Martial Arts Games
- Events of the OCA (Subregional)
  - Central Asian Games
  - East Asian Games (now defunct)
  - South Asian Games
  - Southeast Asian Games
  - West Asian Games
- Events of the APC (Continental)
  - Asian Para Games
  - Asian Youth Para Games
- Events of the APC (Subregional)
  - ASEAN Para Games
