= Koramangala Indoor Stadium =

Stadium in Bangalore, India

- Multi Sports Complex
- Location: Koramangala, Bangalore, Karnataka
- Owner: Government of Karnataka
- Operator: Government of Karnataka
- Capacity: 2,300

Construction
- Opened: 1997

Koramangala Indoor Stadium' is an indoor stadium in Koramangala area of Bangalore city in Karnataka. The stadium was built in 1997 to promote National games and indoor sports in the city. The stadium has a tennis court, an outdoor basketball court, a badminton court as well as a table tennis complex. The stadium is owned and managed by Government of Karnataka's Ministry of Youth Empowerment and Sports.

The stadium is one of the stadiums that was used for the Pro Wrestling League. It is set to host the home matches of the Bengaluru Blasters in the Premier Badminton League's 2017 season. It is also used for non-sports activities like exhibitions, seminars and cultural activities.

During the COVID-19 pandemic situation in 2020, Koramangala Stadium has been converted as one of the COVID-19 Care Centres for Asymptomatic patients.
